= Intendant of Montevideo =

Head of government of Montevideo

- Spanish: Intendente de Montevideo
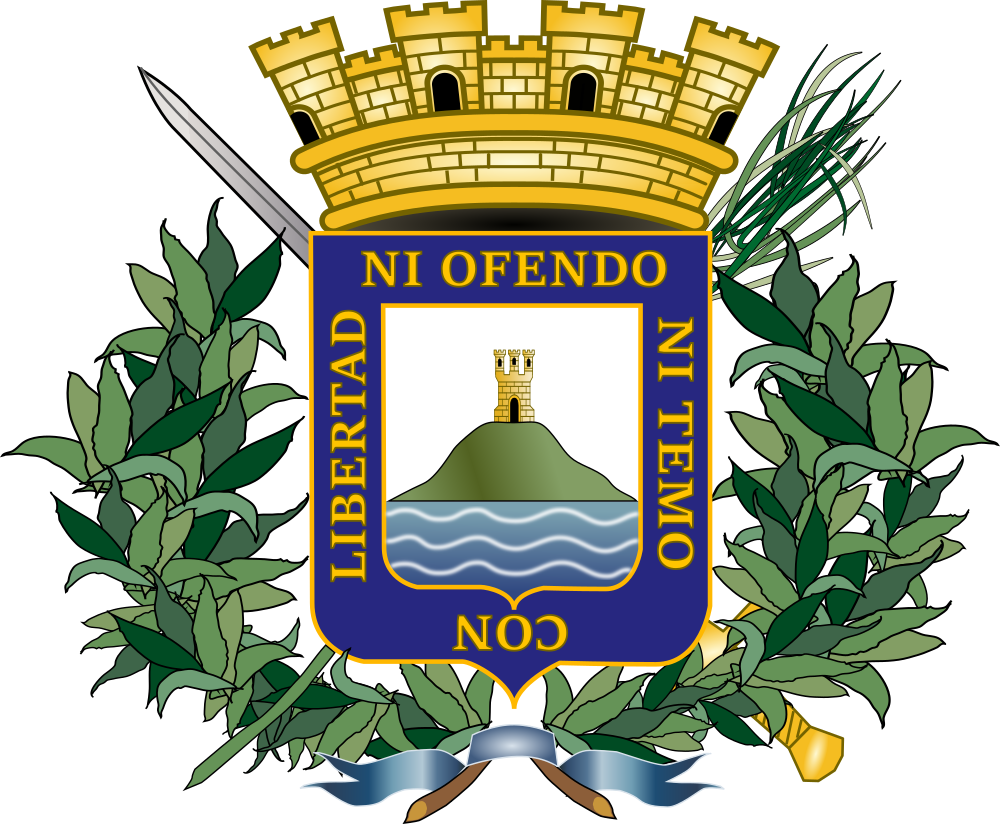
- Coat of arms of Montevideo.

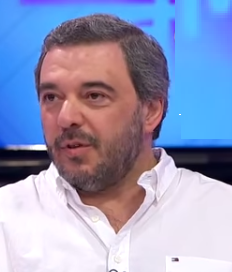
- Incumbent; Mario Bergara since 10 July 2025
- Style: No courtesy, title or style
- Seat: City Hall of Montevideo
- Appointer: Direct election
- Term length: 5 years (renewable)
- Inaugural holder: Daniel Muñoz
- Formation: 19 January 1909
- Website: www.montevideo.gub.uy//

The Intendant of Montevideo is head of the executive branch of the government of Montevideo. The Intendant serves a five-year term and is limited to two successive terms. According to the Constitution, the officeholder is elected in a direct election, which takes place on a date different from that of presidential elections.

== List of Intendants of Montevideo ==
Mayor	Term start	Term end	Election	Party
Daniel Muñoz	1909	1911		Colorado Party
Ramón V. Benzano	1911	1914		Colorado Party
Santiago Rivas	1914	1915		Colorado Party
Francisco Accinelli	1915	1919		Colorado Party
Office replaced by Departmental Councils of Administration (1920-1933)
Alberto Dagnino	1933	1937		Colorado Party
Horacio Acosta y Lara	1937	1942		Colorado Party
Pedro Onetti	1942	1943		Colorado Party
Juan Pedro Fabini	February 1943	February 1947	1942	Colorado Party
Andrés Martínez Trueba	February 1947	February 1948	1946	Colorado Party
Germán Barbato	February 1948	August 1950	1946	Colorado Party
Álvaro Correa Moreno	August 1950	February 1951	1946	Colorado Party
Germán Barbato	February 1951	September 1954	1950	Colorado Party
Armando Malet	September 1954	February 1955	1950	Colorado Party
Departmental Council chaired by José Acquistapace	February 1955	February 1959	1954	Colorado Party
Departmental Council chaired by Daniel Fernández Crespo	February 1959	February 1963	1958	National Party
Departmental Council chaired by: Ledo Arroyo Torres (1963 - 1965); Fermín Sorhueta (1965 - 1967)	February 1963	February 1967	1962	Colorado Party
Glauco Segovia	March 1967	October 1967	1966	Colorado Party
Carlos Bartolomé Herrera	October 1967	October 1969	1966	Colorado Party
Oscar Víctor Rachetti	October 1969	August 1971	1966	Colorado Party
Mario Peyrot	August 1971	February 1972	1966	Colorado Party
Oscar Víctor Rachetti	February 1972	1983	1972, then ratified by the civic-military dictatorship	Colorado Party
Juan Carlos Payssé	1983	February 1985	Appointed by the civic-military dictatorship	National Party
Aquiles Lanza	February 1985	November 1985	1984	Colorado Party
Jorge Luis Elizalde	November 1985	February 1988	1984	Colorado Party
Julio Iglesias Álvarez	February 1988	January 1990	1984	Colorado Party
Eduardo Fabini Jiménez	January 1990	February 1990	1984	Colorado Party
Tabaré Vázquez	February 1990	May 1994	1989	Broad Front (PS)
Tabaré González	May 1994	February 1995	1989	Broad Front (PS)
Mariano Arana	February 1995	July 2005	1994, 2000	Broad Front (VA)
Ricardo Ehrlich	July 2005	February 2010	2005	Broad Front (MPP)
Hyara Rodríguez	February 2010	July 2010	2005	Broad Front (MPP)
Ana Olivera	July 2010	July 2015	2010	Broad Front (PCU)
Daniel Martínez	July 2015	April 2019	2015	Broad Front (PS)
Christian Di Candia	April 2019	November 2020	2015	Broad Front (PS)
Carolina Cosse	November 2020	July 2024	2020	Broad Front
Mauricio Zunino	July 2024	July 2025	2020	Broad Front
Mario Bergara	July 2025	Incumbent	2025	Broad Front

== See also ==
- Intendant
- Intendant of Maldonado
