= 1938 Uruguayan general election =

General elections were held in Uruguay on 28 March 1938. The result was a victory for the Colorado Party, which won a majority of seats in the Chamber of Representatives and received the most votes in the presidential election, in which the Alfredo Baldomir faction emerged as the largest. Baldomir subsequently became President on 19 June.

This was the first time that Uruguayan women exerted their right to vote in a national election.

== Results ==
=== President ===
Party	Candidate	Votes	%
Colorado Party	Alfredo Baldomir	121,259	33.95
Colorado Party	Eduardo Blanco Acevedo	97,998	27.43
Colorado Party	al lema	54	0.02
Colorado Party	Total	219,311	61.40
National Party	Juan José de Arteaga	114,506	32.06
Partido por las Libertades Públicas	Emilio Frugoni	16,901	4.73
Concentración Patriótica Cándida Díaz de Saravia	Justo M. Alonso	6,487	1.82
Total		357,205	100.00
Registered voters/turnout		636,171	–
Source: Nohlen, Bottinelli et al.

=== Chamber of Representatives ===
Party	Votes	%	Seats	+/–
Colorado Party	219,362	58.38	64	+9
National Party	114,564	30.49	29	–10
Civic Union	14,802	3.94	2	0
Socialist Party	13,152	3.50	3	+1
Concentración Patriótica Cándida Díaz de Saravia	7,876	2.10	0	0
Communist Party	5,736	1.53	1	0
Independent Democratic Feminist Party	122	0.03	0	New
Black Native Party	87	0.02	0	New
Party of the Agreement	69	0.02	0	New
Gral. Melchor Pachecho y Obes	1	0.00	0	New
Total	375,771	100.00	99	0
Registered voters/turnout	636,171	–		
Source: Nohlen, Bottinelli et al.

=== Senate ===
Party and lema		Votes	%	Seats	+/–
Colorado Party	Para Servir al País	121,259	33.51	9	–
Colorado Party	Viva Terra	98,049	27.09	6	–
Colorado Party	al lema	54	0.01	–	–
Colorado Party	Total	219,375	60.62	15	0
National Party		114,571	31.66	15	0
Civic Union		14,802	4.09	0	New
Socialist Party		13,175	3.64	0	New
Total		361,910	100.00	30	0
Registered voters/turnout		636,171	–		
Source: Nohlen, Bottinelli et al.
