= List of elections in 1925 =

The following elections occurred in the year 1925.

== Africa ==
- 1925 Egyptian parliamentary election

== Asia ==
- 1925 Egyptian parliamentary election
- 1925 Persian Constituent Assembly election
- 1925 Philippine House of Representatives elections
- 1925 Philippine Senate elections
- 1925 Philippine legislative election

== Europe ==
- 1925 Albanian parliamentary election
- 1925 Albanian presidential election
- 1925 Belgian general election
- 1925 Danish local elections
- 1925 Dutch general election
- 1925 Czechoslovak parliamentary election
- 1925 Finnish presidential election
- 1925 Irish local elections
- 1925 Irish Seanad election
- 1925 Kingdom of Serbs, Croats and Slovenes parliamentary election
- 1925 Latvian parliamentary election
- 1925 Latvian presidential election
- 1925 Portuguese legislative election
- 1925 Portuguese presidential election
- 1925 Luxembourg general election
- 1925 Norwegian local elections
- 1925 Swiss federal election
- 1923 Swiss referendums

=== Germany ===
- 1925 German presidential election

=== United Kingdom ===
- 1925 Ayr Burghs by-election
- 1925 Bury St Edmunds by-election
- 1925 Eastbourne by-election
- 1925 Forest of Dean by-election
- 1925 Galloway by-election
- 1925 Northern Ireland general election
- 1925 Oldham by-election
- 1925 Ripon by-election
- 1925 Stockport by-election
- 1925 University of Oxford Chancellor election
- 1925 Walsall by-election

==== United Kingdom local ====
===== English local =====
- 1925 Southwark Borough election

== North America ==
- 1925 Costa Rican parliamentary election
- 1925 Guatemalan parliamentary election

=== Canada ===
- 1925 Canadian federal election
- 1925 Edmonton municipal election
- 1925 New Brunswick general election
- 1925 Nova Scotia general election
- 1925 Saskatchewan general election
- 1925 Toronto municipal election
- 1925 Yukon general election

=== United States ===
- 1925 New York state election

==== United States gubernatorial ====
- 1925 New Jersey gubernatorial election
- 1925 United States gubernatorial elections
- 1925 Virginia gubernatorial election

==== United States House of Representatives ====
- 1925 United States House of Representatives elections

==== United States Senate ====
- 1925 United States Senate elections
- 1925 United States Senate special election in Wisconsin

==== United States mayoral elections ====
- 1925 Boston mayoral election
- 1925 Dallas mayoral election
- 1925 Indianapolis mayoral election
- 1925 Los Angeles mayoral election
- 1925 Manchester, New Hampshire, mayoral election
- 1925 New York City mayoral election
- 1925 Pittsburgh mayoral election
- 1925 San Diego mayoral election

== Oceania ==
=== Australia ===
- 1925 Australian Senate election
- 1925 Australian federal election
- 1925 New South Wales state election
- 1925 Tasmanian state election
- 1925 Western Australian prohibition referendum

=== New Zealand ===
- 1925 New Zealand general election
- 1925 Franklin by-election

== South America ==
- 1925 Bolivian legislative election
- May 1925 Bolivian general election
- December 1925 Bolivian general election
- 1925 Chilean presidential election
- 1925 Chilean parliamentary election
- 1925 Chilean constitutional referendum
- 1925 Uruguayan National Administration Council election on 8 February 1925, a partial election to renew three of the seats of the National Administration Council.
- 1925 Uruguayan general election on 8 February 1925
- 1925 Uruguayan parliamentary election on 29 November 1925

== See also ==
- Category:1925 elections
