= 1942 Uruguayan general election =

- 29 November 1942
- Registered: 858,713
- Presidential election
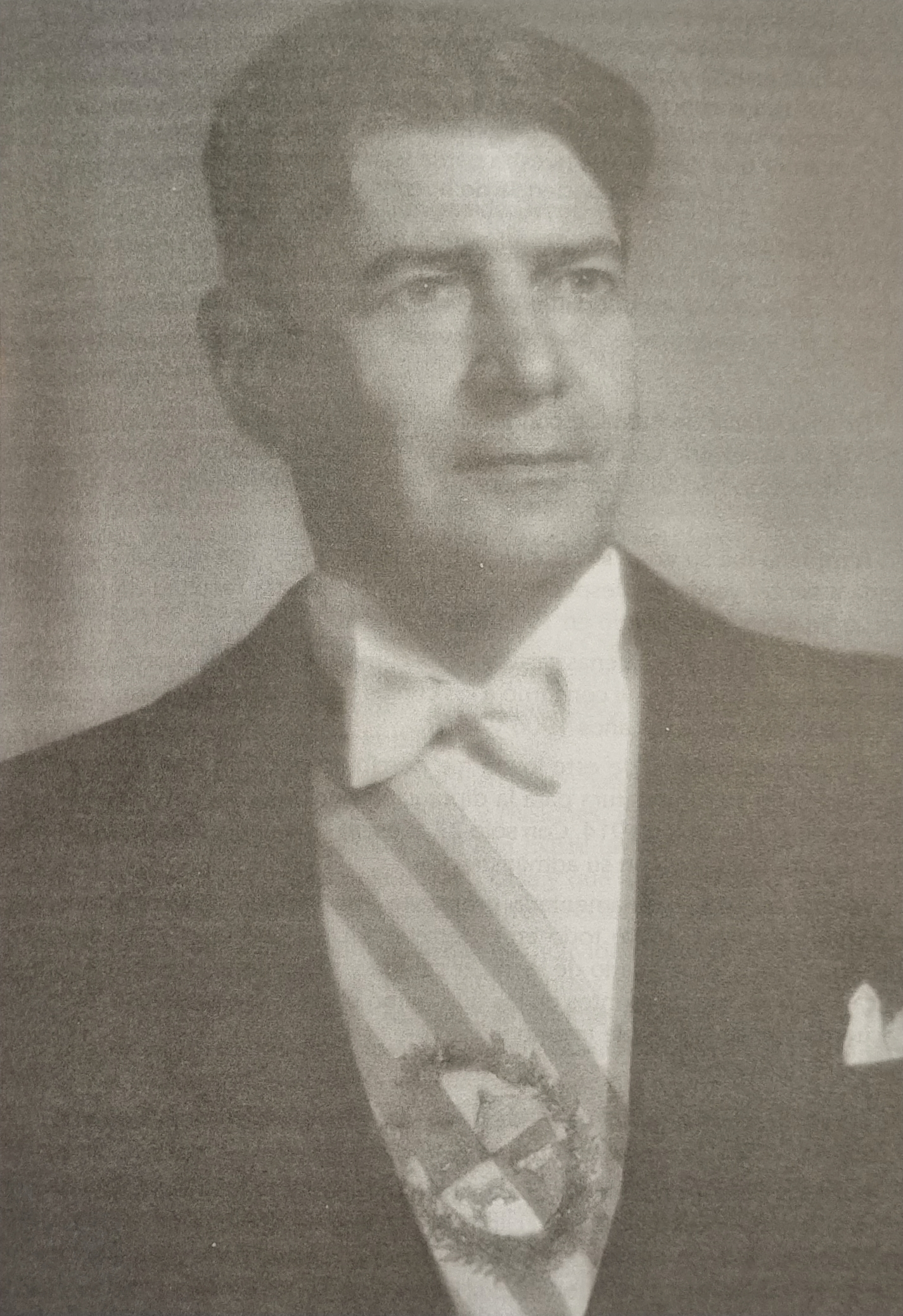

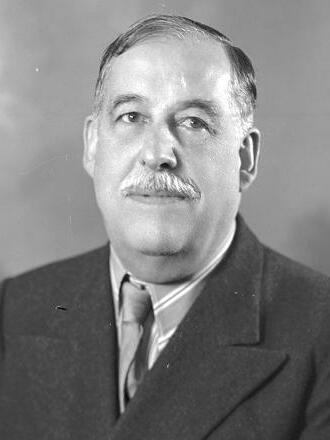

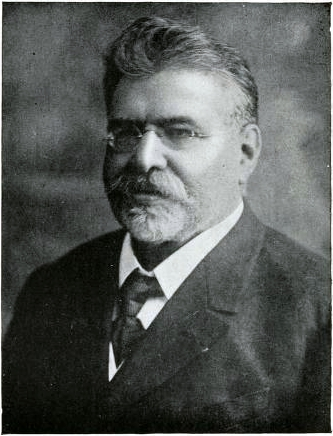
Candidate	Juan José de Amézaga	Luis Alberto de Herrera	Martín C. Martínez
Party	Colorado Party	National Party	PNI
Running mate	Alberto Guani	Roberto Berro	Arturo Lussich
Party vote	328,599	131,235	67,030
Percentage	57.18%	22.84%	11.66%
President before election
Alfredo Baldomir
Colorado
Elected President
Juan José de Amézaga
Colorado

General elections were held in Uruguay on 29 November 1942, alongside a constitutional referendum. The result was a victory for the Colorado Party, which won a majority of seats in the Chamber of Deputies and received the most votes in the presidential election, in which the Juan José de Amézaga faction emerged as the largest. Amézaga subsequently became president on 1 March 1943.

== Results ==
Party	Presidential candidate	Votes	%	Seats			
Party	Presidential candidate	Votes	%	Chamber	+/–	Senate	+/–
Colorado Party	Juan José de Amézaga	234,127	40.74	58	–6	19	+4
Colorado Party	Eduardo Blanco Acevedo	74,767	13.01	58	–6	19	+4
Colorado Party	Eugenio Lagarmilla	18,969	3.30	58	–6	19	+4
Colorado Party	José C. Williman	670	0.12	58	–6	19	+4
Colorado Party	al lema	66	0.01	58	–6	19	+4
Colorado Party	Total	328,599	57.18	58	–6	19	+4
National Party	Luis Alberto de Herrera	129,132	22.47	23	–6	7	–8
National Party	José P. Turena	1,384	0.24	23	–6	7	–8
National Party	José P. Turena	667	0.12	23	–6	7	–8
National Party	al lema	52	0.01	23	–6	7	–8
National Party	Total	131,235	22.84	23	–6	7	–8
Independent National Party	Martín C. Martínez	67,030	11.66	11	New	3	New
Civic Union	Joaquín Secco Illa	24,433	4.25	4	+2	1	+1
Communist Party	Eugenio Gómez	14,330	2.49	2	+1	0	New
Socialist Party	Emilio Frugoni	9,036	1.57	1	–2	0	0
Party of the Agreement	Domingo Tortorelli	40	0.01	0	0	0	New
Total		574,703	100.00	99	0	30	0
Registered voters/turnout		858,713	–				
Source: Parliament
