= 1922 Uruguayan general election =

General elections were held in Uruguay on 26 November 1922 to elect the president, all members of the Chamber of Representatives, seven of the nineteen members of the Senate and three members of the National Council of Administration. It was the first time that the presidency had been directly elected, and the Colorado Party received most votes overall, and its lead candidate José Serrato was elected president. The Colorado Party factions also won a majority of seats in the Chamber of Representatives, while the National Party won five of the seven Senate seats.

== Results ==
=== President ===
Candidate	Party	Votes	%
José Serrato	Colorado Party	123,076	50.41
Luis Alberto de Herrera	National Party	117,901	48.29
—	Communist Party	3,179	1.30
Total		244,156	100.00
Source: Bottinelli et al.

=== National Council of Administration ===
Party	Votes	%	Seats
Colorado Party	122,311	50.25	2
National Party	117,895	48.44	1
Communist Party	3,179	1.31	0
Total	243,385	100.00	3
Source: Bottinelli et al.

=== Chamber of Representatives ===
Party	Votes	%	Seats
National Party	116,104	47.44	56
Colorado Party	96,612	39.48	65
Gral. Rivera Colorado Party	15,250	6.23	–
Radical Colorado Party	9,862	4.03	–
Communist Party	3,071	1.25	1
Civic Union	2,872	1.17	1
Socialist Party	953	0.39	–
Industrial Union	2	0.00	–
Total	244,726	100.00	123
Source: Bottinelli et al.

=== Senate ===
Party	Votes	%	Seats
National Party	60,924	52.55	5
Colorado Party	52,003	44.85	2
Communist Party	3,016	2.60	0
Total	115,943	100.00	7
Source: Bottinelli et al.

== Aftermath ==
Following the elections, Serrato was inaugurated as president on 1 March 1923.
