= 1950 Uruguayan general election =

General elections were held in Uruguay on 26 November 1950, alongside a constitutional referendum. The result was a victory for the Colorado Party, which won the most seats in the Chamber of Deputies and received the most votes in the presidential election.

== Results ==
Under the electoral system in place at the time, each political party could have as many as three presidential candidates. The combined result of the votes for a party's candidates determined which party would control the executive branch, and whichever of the winning party's candidates finished in first place would be declared President.

The Batllista wing of the Colorado Party won 41 of the 53 Colorado seats in the Chamber, with the Liberty and Justice wing winning the other 12. The Batllistas had similar success in the Senate, winning 12 of the 17 Colorado seats, while the 'To serve the country' wing won five.

Party	Presidential candidate	Votes	%	Seats			
Party	Presidential candidate	Votes	%	Chamber	+/–	Senate	+/–
Colorado Party	Andrés Martínez Trueba	161,262	19.57	53	+6	17	+2
Colorado Party	César Mayo Gutiérrez	150,930	18.32	53	+6	17	+2
Colorado Party	Eduardo Blanco Acevedo	120,949	14.68	53	+6	17	+2
Colorado Party	al lema	313	0.04	53	+6	17	+2
Colorado Party	Total	433,454	52.61	53	+6	17	+2
National Party	Luis Alberto de Herrera	253,077	30.72	31	0	10	0
National Party	Salvador Estradé	1,421	0.17	31	0	10	0
National Party	al lema	336	0.04	31	0	10	0
National Party	Total	254,834	30.93	31	0	10	0
Independent National Party	Asdrúbal Delgado	62,701	7.61	7	–2	2	–1
Civic Union	Juan Vicente Chiarino	36,100	4.38	4	–1	1	0
Communist Party	Eugenio Gómez	19,026	2.31	2	–3	0	–1
Socialist Party	Emilio Frugoni	17,401	2.11	2	0	0	0
Democratic Party	Elbio Rivero	242	0.03	0	0	0	0
Labor Concordance Party	Domingo Tortorelli	38	0.00	0	New	0	New
Liberal Party	Luis Strazzarino	23	0.00	0	New	0	New
Party for the Defence of Rights	Ramón Rodríguez Socas	6	0.00	0	New	0	New
Party of the People	Froilan Aguilar	4	0.00	0	New	0	New
Total		823,829	100.00	99	0	30	0
Registered voters/turnout		1,168,206	–				
Source: Instituto Factum
