= 1933 Uruguayan Constitutional Assembly election =

Constitutional Assembly elections were held in Uruguay on 25 June 1933. They followed a presidential coup by Gabriel Terra on 31 March, Following the coup, the Assembly was appointed to formulate a new constitution. The various factions of the Colorado Party emerged as the largest group in the Assembly, winning 151 of the 284 seats.

== Results ==
Party or lema		Votes	%	Seats
Colorado Party	Batllist Terrist Colorado Party	80,563	32.63	95
Colorado Party	Gral. Rivera Colorado Party	24,088	9.76	28
Colorado Party	Party for the Colorado Tradition	13,713	5.55	15
Colorado Party	Radical Colorado Party	11,595	4.70	13
Colorado Party	National Commission for the Unification of the Colorado Party	802	0.32	0
Colorado Party	Total	130,761	52.96	151
National Party		101,419	41.08	117
Civic Union		9,707	3.93	11
Communist Party		4,950	2.00	5
Reformist Party		48	0.02	0
Total		246,885	100.00	284
Registered voters/turnout		428,597	–	
Source: Nohlen, Bottinelli et al.

== Aftermath ==
The Assembly produced a new constitution which was approved in a referendum, and promulgated the following year. It abolished the National Council of Administration, replacing it with a nine-member Council of Ministers, in which the second party was guaranteed three members. It also gave the party that had finished second in parliamentary elections half the seats in the Senate.
