= 1926 Uruguayan general election =

General elections were held in Uruguay on 28 November 1926, electing the president, three members of the National Council of Administration and six of the nineteen members of the Senate.

Although Luis Alberto de Herrera of the National Party received the most personal votes for president, the Colorado Party received the most votes overall, resulting its lead candidate Juan Campisteguy being elected president. The Colorado Party won two of the three seats in the National Council of Administration and three of the five Senate seats.

== Results ==
=== President ===
Party and lema		Candidate	Votes	%
Colorado Party	For the Colorado victory	Juan Campisteguy	97,475	33.71
Colorado Party	For the Colorado tradition	Julio María Sosa	43,929	15.19
Colorado Party	al lema	—	149	0.05
Colorado Party	Total		141,553	48.96
National Party		Luis Alberto de Herrera	139,959	48.41
Radical White Party		Lorenzo Carnelli	3,844	1.33
Communist Party		Elias Sosa	3,775	1.31
Total			289,131	100.00
Registered voters/turnout			353,860	–
Source: Nohlen, Bottinelli et al.

=== National Council of Administration ===
Party	Votes	%	Seats
Colorado Party	141,553	48.96	2
National Party	139,959	48.41	1
Radical White Party	3,844	1.33	0
Communist Party	3,775	1.31	0
Total	289,131	100.00	3
Registered voters/turnout	353,860	–	
Source: Nohlen, Bottinelli et al.

=== Senate ===
Party	Votes	%	Seats
Colorado Party	32,823	46.90	3
National Party	37,119	53.04	2
Communist Party	44	0.06	0
Vacant seat			1
Total	69,986	100.00	6
Source: Bottinelli et al.
