= 1928 Uruguayan general election =

General elections were held in Uruguay on 25 November 1928, electing all members of the Chamber of Representatives, three members of the National Council of Administration and seven of the nineteen members of the Senate.

The various factions of the Colorado Party received the most votes in the Chamber of Representatives elections, but the National Party won the most seats. The Colorado Party won two of the three seats in the National Council of Administration, while the National Party won five of the seven Senate seats.

== Results ==
=== National Council of Administration ===
Party	Votes	%	Seats
Colorado Party	143,280	48.94	2
National Party	141,055	48.18	1
Communist Party	3,791	1.29	0
Radical White Party	3,715	1.27	0
Civic Union	954	0.33	0
Total	292,795	100.00	3
Registered voters/turnout	382,817	–	
Source: Nohlen, Bottinelli et al.

=== Chamber of Representatives ===
Party and lema		Votes	%	Seats
Colorado Party	Batllista Colorado Party	88,553	29.61	38
Colorado Party	Party for the Colorado Tradition	21,814	7.30	9
Colorado Party	Gral. Rivera Colorado Party	21,322	7.13	8
Colorado Party	Radical Colorado Party	9,879	3.30	4
Colorado Party	Partido Concentración Colorada	1,671	0.56	0
Colorado Party	Agrupación Colorada Juventud Riverista	831	0.28	0
Colorado Party	Total	144,070	48.18	59
National Party		140,940	47.13	60
Radical White Party		4,219	1.41	1
Communist Party		3,911	1.31	1
Socialist Party		2,931	0.98	1
Civic Union		2,743	0.92	1
Agrarian Party		199	0.07	0
Reformist Party		4	0.00	0
Total		299,017	100.00	123
Registered voters/turnout		382,217	–	
Source: Nohlen, Bottinelli et al.

=== Senate ===
Party	Votes	%	Seats
National Party	75,190	46.30	5
Colorado Party	66,209	40.77	2
Partido Concentración Colorada	6,939	4.27	0
Communist Party	3,122	1.92	0
Gral. Rivera Colorado Party	3,029	1.87	0
Party for the Colorado Tradition	2,851	1.76	0
Socialist Party	2,445	1.51	0
Civic Union	1,754	1.08	0
Agrupación Colorada Juventud Riverista	682	0.42	0
Agrarian Party	159	0.10	0
Total	162,380	100.00	7
Source: Bottinelli et al.
