= 1934 Uruguayan constitutional referendum =

A constitutional referendum was held in Uruguay on 19 April 1934, alongside parliamentary elections. The new constitution was approved by 95.75% of voters.

== Background ==
A series of conflicts between the National Council of Administration and President Gabriel Terra led to Terra leading a presidential coup on 31 March 1933. Terra instituted a government that suspended the 1918 constitution, and elections were held for a Constitutional Assembly on 25 June. The various factions of the Colorado Party emerged as the largest group in the Assembly, winning 151 of the 284 seats.

== New constitution ==
The new constitution abolished the National Council of Administration and transferred its powers to the President, with President also becoming the head of government. Other changes included the Senate being equally divided between the two parties receiving the most votes, and allowing the public to propose constitutional amendments (though 20% of the electorate).

== Results ==
Choice	Votes	%
For	228,145	95.75
Against	10,124	4.25
Invalid/blank votes		–
Total	238,269	100
Registered voters/turnout	422,865	56.34
Source: Direct Democracy

== See also ==
- Uruguayan Constitution
