= 1931 Uruguayan parliamentary election =

Parliamentary elections were held in Uruguay on 29 November 1931. The various factions of the Colorado Party won the most seats in the Chamber of Representatives.

== Results ==
Party and lema		Votes	%	Seats	+/–
Colorado Party	Batllista Colorado Party	110,693	35.82	45	+8
Colorado Party	Gral. Rivera Colorado Party	18,302	5.92	7	–2
Colorado Party	Party for the Colorado Tradition	13,831	4.48	5	–4
Colorado Party	Radical Colorado Party	8,965	2.90	3	–1
Colorado Party	Total	151,791	49.12	60	+1
National Party		133,625	43.24	55	–5
Civic Union		7,404	2.40	3	+2
Communist Party		6,235	2.02	2	+1
Socialist Party		5,630	1.82	2	+1
Radical White Party		3,367	1.09	1	0
Sindica Gente de Artes y Afines		412	0.13	0	New
Agrupactión Militar Patria y Ejército		244	0.08	0	New
Party for the Defence of the People		156	0.05	0	New
People's Agrarian Party		151	0.05	0	0
People's Party		26	0.01	0	New
Reformist Party		7	0.00	0	0
Total		309,048	100.00	123	0
Registered voters/turnout		419,271	–		
Source: Nohlen, Parliament
