= 1930 Uruguayan general election =

General elections were held in Uruguay on 30 November 1930, electing the president, three members of the National Council of Administration and six of the nineteen members of the Senate. Although Luis Alberto de Herrera of the National Party received the most individual votes for president, the Colorado Party received more votes overall and its lead candidate Gabriel Terra was elected president. The Colorado Party won two of the three seats in the National Council of Administration, while the National Party won four of the six seats in the Senate.

== Results ==
=== President ===
Party and lema		Candidate	Votes	%
Colorado Party	Libertad y Justicia	Gabriel Terra	126,766	39.95
Colorado Party	Riveristas	Pedro Manini Ríos	28,772	9.07
Colorado Party	Radicales	Federico Fleurquin	8,302	2.62
Colorado Party	Anti Colegialistas	—	1,118	0.35
Colorado Party	al lema	—	111	0.03
Colorado Party	Total		165,069	52.02
National Party	National Party	Luis Alberto de Herrera	131,777	41.53
National Party	National Party	Eduardo Lamas	18,011	5.68
National Party	al lema	—	209	0.07
National Party	Total		149,997	47.27
Communist Party		Eugenio Gómez	2,277	0.72
Total			317,343	100.00
Source: Bottinelli et al.

=== National Council of Administration ===
Party	Votes	%	Seats
Colorado Party	165,828	52.14	2
National Party	149,978	47.15	1
Communist Party	2,258	0.71	0
Total	318,064	100.00	3
Source: Bottinelli et al.

=== Senate ===
Party	Votes	%	Seats
National Party	25,575	52.81	4
Colorado Party	22,051	45.53	2
Communist Party	287	0.59	0
Partido Colorado Gral. Rivera	324	0.67	0
Partido Tradición Colorada	190	0.39	0
Total	48,427	100.00	6
Source: Bottinelli et al.
