= 1932 Uruguayan general election =

General elections were held in Uruguay on 27 November 1932 to elect members of the National Council of Administration and 6 of the 19 members of the Senate. The various factions of the Colorado Party received almost two-thirds of the vote.

== Results ==
=== National Council of Administration ===
Party or alliance		Votes	%	Seats
Colorado Party	For the Victory of Batllism	85,106	52.98	2
Colorado Party	Party for the Tradition	11,388	7.09	0
Colorado Party	Radical Colorado Party	11,073	6.89	0
Colorado Party	Colorado Party	97	0.06	0
Colorado Party	Total	107,664	67.03	2
National Party	For Suffrage, for the Economic Democracy	37,872	23.58	1
National Party	People's Group	3,828	2.38	0
National Party	National Party	208	0.13	0
National Party	Total	41,908	26.09	1
Socialist Party		5,826	3.63	0
Communist Party		5,227	3.25	0
Total		160,625	100.00	3
Registered voters/turnout		431,192	–	
Source: Nohlen, Bottinelli et al.

=== Senate ===
Party	Votes	%	Seats
Colorado Party	28,977	52.31	4
National Party	25,656	46.32	2
Communist Party	462	0.83	0
Socialist Party	298	0.54	0
Total	55,393	100.00	6
Source: Bottinelli et al.
