= 1966 Uruguayan general election =

General elections were held in Uruguay on 27 November 1966, alongside a constitutional referendum. The result was a victory for the Colorado Party, which won the most seats in the Chamber of Deputies and received the most votes in the presidential election.

== Results ==
Party	Presidential candidate	Votes	%	Seats			
Party	Presidential candidate	Votes	%	Chamber	+/–	Senate	+/–
Colorado Party	Óscar Diego Gestido	262,040	21.27	50	+6	16	+2
Colorado Party	Jorge Batlle Ibáñez	215,642	17.51	50	+6	16	+2
Colorado Party	Amílcar Vasconcellos	77,476	6.29	50	+6	16	+2
Colorado Party	Zelmar Michelini	48,022	3.90	50	+6	16	+2
Colorado Party	Justino Jiménez de Aréchaga	4,064	0.33	50	+6	16	+2
Colorado Party	al lema	389	0.03	50	+6	16	+2
Colorado Party	Total	607,633	49.33	50	+6	16	+2
National Party	Martín Echegoyen	228,309	18.54	41	–6	13	–2
National Party	Alberto Gallinal Heber	171,618	13.93	41	–6	13	–2
National Party	Alberto Héber Usher	96,772	7.86	41	–6	13	–2
National Party	al lema	211	0.02	41	–6	13	–2
National Party	Total	496,910	40.34	41	–6	13	–2
Liberation Left Front	Adolfo Aguirre González	69,750	5.66	5	+2	1	0
Christian Democratic Party	Adolfo Gelsi Bidart	37,219	3.02	3	0	0	–1
Socialist Party	José Pedro Cardoso	7,892	0.64	0	New	0	New
Socialist Party	Emilio Frugoni	3,646	0.30	0	New	0	New
Socialist Party	al lema	21	0.00	0	New	0	New
Socialist Party	Total	11,559	0.94	0	New	0	New
Christian Civic Movement	Juan Vicente Chiarino	4,230	0.34	0	New	0	New
Popular Union	Enrique Erro	2,655	0.22	0	–2	0	0
Agrarian and Workers' Party	Moizzo	1,616	0.13	0	New	0	New
Liberal Party	Grassi	74	0.01	0	New	0	New
Federal Party	Sanjurjo	72	0.01	0	0	0	0
Party for Solís Department	Fioroni	44	0.00	0	0	0	0
Total		1,231,762	100.00	99	0	30	–1
Registered voters/turnout		1,658,368	–				
Source: Electoral Court
