= 1934 Uruguayan parliamentary election =

Parliamentary elections were held in Uruguay on 19 April 1934, alongside a constitutional referendum. For the first time, the Senate was directly elected by voters. The result was a victory for the Colorado Party, which won a majority of seats in the Chamber of Representatives.

== Results ==
=== Chamber of Representatives ===
Party and lema		Votes	%	Seats	+/–
Colorado Party	Batllista Colorado Party	110,330	44.29	43	–2
Colorado Party	Gral. Rivera Colorado Party	23,344	9.37	10	+3
Colorado Party	Party for the Colorado Tradition	6,158	2.47	2	–3
Colorado Party	Total	139,832	56.13	55	–5
National Party	National Party	91,608	36.77	39	–16
National Party	Saravist Party	1,295	0.52	0	New
National Party	Total	92,903	37.29	39	–16
Civic Union		6,878	2.76	2	–1
Socialist Party		5,849	2.35	2	0
Communist Party		3,634	1.46	1	–1
Reformist Party		29	0.01	0	0
Total		249,125	100.00	99	–24
Registered voters/turnout		422,865	–		
Source: Nohlen, Bottinelli et al.

=== Senate ===
Party and lema		Votes	%	Seats	+/–
Colorado Party	For Victory	104,087	47.05	13	–
Colorado Party	Gral. Rivera Colorado Party	21,853	9.88	2	–
Colorado Party	Colorado Party	41	0.02	0	–
Colorado Party	Total	125,981	56.95	15	+7
National Party	Herrerismo	91,426	41.33	15	–
National Party	National Party	159	0.07	0	–
National Party	Total	91,585	41.40	15	+4
Communist Party		3,637	1.64	0	0
Total		221,203	100.00	30	+11
Registered voters/turnout		422,865	–		
Source: Nohlen, Bottinelli et al.
