= 1919 Uruguayan parliamentary election =

Parliamentary elections were held in Uruguay on 27 November 1919. Although the National Party won the most seats as a single party, the various factions of the Colorado Party took over half the seats in the Chamber of Representatives.

== Results ==
Party or lema		Votes	%	Seats
Colorado Party	Batllista Colorado Party	55,623	29.53	40
Colorado Party	Gral Rivera Colorado Party	13,129	6.97	9
Colorado Party	Bandiera Colorado Party	12,293	6.53	7
Colorado Party	Colorado Union	11,612	6.17	7
Colorado Party	Colorado List	5,032	2.67	1
Colorado Party	Total	97,689	51.87	64
National Party	National Party	71,538	37.98	56
National Party	White Party	11,982	6.36	0
National Party	Total	83,520	44.34	56
Socialist Party		4,324	2.30	2
Civic Union		2,133	1.13	1
Democratic Party		686	0.36	0
Total		188,352	100.00	123
Source: Nohlen
