= Lorenzo Carnelli =

Uruguayan politician (1887–1960)

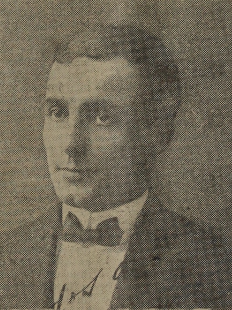
Lorenzo Carnelli

Lorenzo Carnelli (1887 – 1960) was a Uruguayan lawyer and politician who belonged to the National Party.

== Career ==
In 1925, he left the National Party and founded the Radical National Party. In the elections of 1927, he got 2.2% of the vote. Blanco historical leader Luis Alberto de Herrera lost these elections by 1% of the vote and Carnelli is often cited as the reason for this. In 1933, he was politically exiled.
