= Rodney Arismendi =

Uruguayan politician (1913–1989)

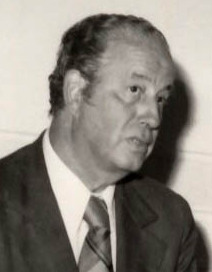
- Arismendi in 1976

National Representative of Uruguay
- In office 1946–1973
- Constituency: Montevideo

Personal details
- Born: Tibaldo Rodney Arismendi Carrasco; 21 March 1913 Río Branco, Uruguay
- Died: 27 December 1989 (aged 76) Montevideo, Uruguay
- Party: Communist Party of Uruguay
- Children: Marina Arismendi

Tibaldo Rodney Arismendi Carrasco (21 March 1913 – 27 December 1989) was an Uruguayan politician and writer.

== Biography ==
Arismendi was born in Río Branco. In 1931 he began law studies at the University of the Republic in Montevideo; he joined the Communist Party of Uruguay (PCU) in the same year, and took part in the student opposition to the dictatorship of Gabriel Terra during the 1930s. As a journalist and editor for the newspaper Diario Popular and the PCU journal Justicia, he was forced into exile. In the 1946 general election, however, he was elected a member of the Chamber of Representatives. He would be reelected for seven consecutive terms, and served until 1973.

In 1955 Arismendi led the opposition within the PCU against then-General Secretary Eugenio Gómez, who was being accused of an authoritarian and sectarian leadership style. The movement won a majority at the 16th Congress of the party the same year, where Arismendi was elected General Secretary. He would serve in this role until the party's 21st Congress in 1987, where he was made president of the Central Committee instead.

With the beginning of the civic-military dictatorship in 1973, political parties were banned, and the PCU was forced to continue its activities as a clandestine organization. Arismendi was arrested and imprisoned in May 1974; he was released in January 1975, on the condition of him going into exile to the Soviet Union. Speculations rose that Arismendi's release was made in exchange for him handing over the PCU's archives, with information on party members, to the authorities; the PCU itself has denied this, however, stating that Arismendi did not have access to the party archives in his role as General Secretary.

Arismendi returned to Uruguay in 1984, shortly before the end of the dictatorship. In the 1989 general election he was elected to the Senate, but died before taking office.

His daughter, Marina Arismendi, is also a PCU politician.

== Works ==
- La justicia soviética defiende al mundo (Montevideo: Unidad, 1938)
- La filosofía del marxismo y el señor Haya de la Torre (Montevideo: Editorial "América", 1946)
- Para un prontuario del dólar (al margen del Plan Truman) (Montevideo: Ediciones Pueblos Unidos, 1947)
- El congreso de los constructores del comunismo. Acerca de la obra de Stalin "Problemas económicos del socialismo en la U.R.S.S." (Montevideo: Ediciones Pueblos Unidos, 1953)
- Informe de balance del Comité Central. XVIII Congreso del Partido Comunista (Montevideo: Estudios, 1962)
- Problemas de una revolución continental (2 vols., Montevideo: Ediciones Pueblos Unidos, 1962)
- Algunos temas en debate acerca de nuestra revolución (Montevideo: Partido Comunista del Uruguay, 1963)
- Un instante de transición hacia batallas más altas (Ediciones de la Agrupación Comunista de Médicos, 1969)
- Insurgencia juvenil. ¿Revuelta o revolución? (Montevideo: Ediciones Pueblos Unidos, 1970)
- Lenin, la revolución y América Latina (Montevideo: Ediciones Pueblos Unidos, 1970)
- La revolución uruguaya en la hora del Frente Amplio (Montevideo: Ediciones Pueblos Unidos, 1971)
- Uruguay y América Latina en los años setenta. Experiencias y balances de una revolución (Montevideo: Ediciones Pueblos Unidos, 1972)
- La perspectiva de un poder del pueblo (Montevideo: Partido Comunista del Uruguay, 1973)
- Lenin y nuestro tiempo (Moscow: Editorial Progreso, 1983)
- Sobre la enseñanza, la literatura y el arte (Montevideo: Ediciones Pueblos Unidos, 1984)
- Vigencia del marxismo-leninismo (Mexico: Grijalbo, 1984)
- Enseñanza democrática (1985)
- Ocho corazones latiendo (1987)

== See also ==
- List of political families#Uruguay
