= 1925 Uruguayan parliamentary election =

Parliamentary elections were held in Uruguay on 29 November 1925. Although the National Party won the most seats as a single party, the various factions of the Colorado Party won over half the seats in the Chamber of Representatives.

== Results ==
Party and lema		Votes	%	Seats	+/–
Colorado Party	Batllista Colorado Party	106,693	39.30	50	+1
Colorado Party	Gral. Rivera Colorado Party	16,302	6.01	7	–1
Colorado Party	Radical Colorado Party	8,436	3.11	3	–2
Colorado Party	Colorado Union of Durazno	2,318	0.85	1	New
Colorado Party	Agrupación Colorada Batllismo Libre	868	0.32	0	–
Colorado Party	Total	134,617	49.59	61	–2
National Party		122,530	45.14	57	–1
Communist Party		4,838	1.78	2	+1
Radical White Party		4,677	1.72	2	New
Civic Union		2,999	1.10	1	0
Socialist Party		1,794	0.66	0	0
People's Agrarian Party		13	0.00	0	New
Total		271,468	100.00	123	0
Registered voters/turnout		331,743	–		
Source: Bottinelli et al.
