= 1916 Uruguayan Constitutional Assembly election =

Constitutional Assembly elections were held in Uruguay on 30 July 1916. The National Party emerged as the largest party, winning 105 of the 218 seats. The Batllista wing of the Colorado Party was defeated as a result of a coalition of nationalist and non-Batllista Colorado Party members. According to one study, "Exigencies of politics precluded a clear-cut batllista control of the constitutional convention elected in 1916 even though Batlle's followers still dominated the congress."

== Results ==
Party	Votes	%	Seats
National Party	68,073	46.42	105
Collegiate Colorado Party	60,420	41.21	87
Anti-Collegiate	14,548	9.92	22
Socialist Party	2,001	1.36	2
Civic Union	1,590	1.08	2
Total	146,632	100.00	218
Registered voters/turnout	223,020	–	
Source: Nohlen

== See also ==
- Constitution of Uruguay
