= 1962 Uruguayan constitutional referendum =

A constitutional referendum was held in Uruguay on 25 November 1962 alongside general elections. The proposed amendments to the constitution were rejected by 83% of voters.

== Proposals ==
The amendments had been put forward by the Ruralista/Herrerista faction of the Colorado Party through the General Assembly, and proposed re-introducing a presidential system of government to replace the colegiado system.

== Results ==
Choice	Votes	%
For	195,623	16.71
Against	975,397	83.29
Total	1,171,020	100
Registered voters/turnout	1,526,868	76.69
Source: Direct Democracy
