= Constitution of Uruguay of 1934 =

Supreme law of Uruguay from 1934 to 1942

The third Constitution of Uruguay was in force between 1934 and 1942.

Approved in a referendum on 19 April 1934, it replaced the previous constitutional text, which had been in force since 1918.

== Overview ==
The 1934 constitution abolished the colegiado and transferred its power to the president. Nevertheless, presidential powers remained somewhat limited. The executive power once again was exercised by a president who had to make decisions together with the ministers. The 1934 charter established the Council of Ministers (Consejo de Ministros) as the body in which these decisions were to be made. This council consisted of the president and the cabinet ministers. The constitution required the chief executive to appoint three of the nine cabinet ministers from among the members of the political party that received the second largest number of votes in the presidential election. The General Assembly, for its part, could issue votes of no confidence in cabinet ministers, with the approval of two-thirds of its members.

The constitution divided the Senate between the Blancos and the Colorados or, as political scientist Martin Weinstein has pointed out, between the Herrerist faction of the Blancos (named after Luis Alberto de Herrera) and the Terrist wing of the Colorados (named after Gabriel Terra; president, 1931–38). The party that garnered the second largest number of votes automatically received 50 percent of the Senate seats. In addition, the 1934 charter empowered the Supreme Court of Justice to rule on the constitutionality of the laws. This system, which lasted eighteen years, further limited the power of the president and his government.

In 1942, a bloodless coup led by President Alfredo Baldomir suspended this constitution; soon a constitutional assembly was summoned in order to draft a new Constitution.

== See also ==
- Constitution of Uruguay
- Gabriel Terra
- 1934 Uruguayan constitutional referendum
