= Museo de la Casa de Luis Alberto de Herrera =

Coordinates: 34°51′49″S 56°10′34″W

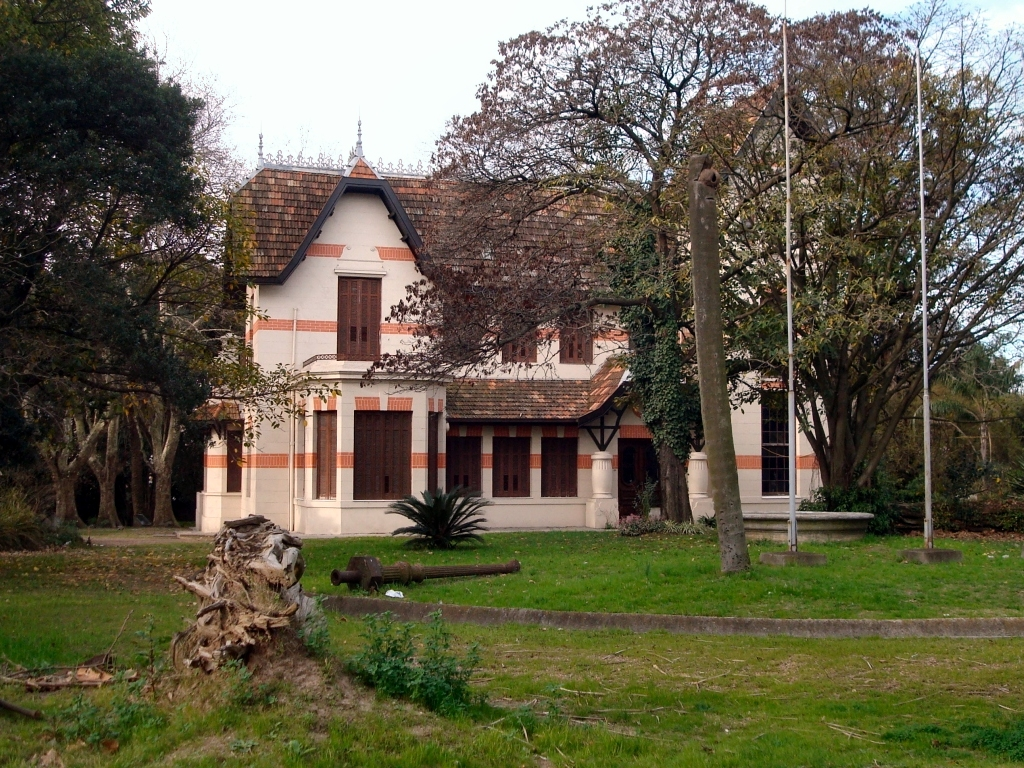
Casa de Luis Alberto de Herrera

Museo de la Casa de Luis Alberto de Herrera (translation: House Museum of Luis Alberto de Herrera) is a museum in the Brazo Oriental barrio of Montevideo, Uruguay. The street in which the house is situated, somewhat set back from the road, is now known as Avenida Dr. Luis Alberto de Herrera (previously Avenida Larrañaga). It is surrounded by a park designed by landscape architect Charles Racine.

== History ==
The building was constructed at the end of the 19th century and was the residence, among other distinguished persons, of the National Party leader Luis Alberto de Herrera, who was active in Uruguayan politics for most of the 20th century until his death in 1959. It has been annexed to the National Historical Museum in 1966.

== See also ==
- List of museums in Uruguay
- Luis Alberto de Herrera#Ideas and legacy
- Herrerismo#Distinction
- Brazo Oriental#Landmarks
