= 1962 Uruguayan general election =

General elections were held in Uruguay on 25 November 1962, alongside a constitutional referendum. The result was a victory for the National Party, which won the most seats in the National Council of Government, the Chamber of Deputies and the Senate.

== Results ==
Party	Votes	%	Seats				
Party	Votes	%	NCG	CoD	+/–	Sen	+/–
National Party	545,029	46.54	6	47	–4	15	–2
Colorado Party	521,231	44.51	3	44	+6	14	2
Liberation Left Front	40,886	3.49	0	3	+1	1	0
Christian Democratic Party	35,703	3.05	0	3	0	1	0
Popular Union	27,041	2.31	0	2	New	0	New
Progressive Movement	650	0.06	0	0	New	0	New
Revolutionary Workers' Party	213	0.02	0	0	0	0	0
Party for Solís Department	167	0.01	0	0	New	0	New
Federal Party	63	0.01	0	0	New	0	New
Party of the Workers	22	0.00	0	0	New	0	New
Labour Party	13	0.00	0	0	0	0	0
Oriental Revolutionary Movement	2	0.00	0	0	New	0	New
Total	1,171,020	100.00	9	99	0	31	0
Registered voters/turnout	1,528,239	–					
Source: Electoral Court
