= Renán Rodríguez =

Uruguayan journalist and politician

Renán Rodríguez (1912–1999) was a Uruguayan journalist and politician who belonged to the Colorado Party. He served as Minister of Education and Culture. He served as a deputy, senator, Minister of Public Instruction and Social Security, Secretary General of the Retirement and Pension Institute, director of the newspaper El Día, candidate for Vice President on two occasions and President of the Electoral Court after the democratic restoration.
