= Jaime Pérez =

Uruguayan politician (1928–2005)

Jaime Gerschuni Pérez, popularly known as Jaime Pérez (1928–2005) was a Uruguayan politician and leader of the Communist Party of Uruguay.
