= 1946 Uruguayan general election =

General elections were held in Uruguay on 24 November 1946, alongside a constitutional referendum. The result was a victory for the Colorado Party, which won the most seats in the Chamber of Deputies and received the most votes in the presidential election, in which Tomás Berreta was elected. Berreta subsequently became President on 1 March 1947.

The Batllista faction of the Colorado Party, which won the most seats of the Colorado factions, would remain in power until 1958.

== Results ==
=== President ===
Party	Presidential candidate	Votes	%
Colorado Party	Tomás Berreta	185,715	28.60
Colorado Party	Rafael Schiaffino	83,534	12.86
Colorado Party	Alfredo Baldomir	40,875	6.29
Colorado Party	al lema	372	0.06
Colorado Party	Total	310,496	47.81
National Party	Luis Alberto de Herrera	205,923	31.71
National Party	Basilio Muñoz	1,479	0.23
National Party	Basilio Muñoz	557	0.09
National Party	al lema	161	0.02
National Party	Total	208,120	32.05
Independent National Party	Alfredo García Morales	62,955	9.69
Civic Union	Joaquín Secco Illa	35,154	5.41
Communist Party	Eugenio Gómez	32,680	5.03
Total		649,405	100.00
Registered voters/turnout		994,345	–
Source: Instituto Factum

=== Chamber of Deputies ===
The Batllista faction of the Colorado Party won 31 of the 47 Colorado seats, with 12 seats won by the 'Liberty and Justice wing' and four by the 'To serve the country' wing.

Party	Votes	%	Seats	+/–
Colorado Party	310,556	46.34	47	–11
National Party	208,088	31.05	31	+8
Independent National Party	62,949	9.39	9	–2
Civic Union	35,147	5.24	5	+1
Communist Party	32,677	4.88	5	+3
Socialist Party	15,731	2.35	2	+1
Democratic Party	5,081	0.76	0	New
Total	670,229	100.00	99	0
Registered voters/turnout	994,345	–		
Source: Instituto Factum

=== Senate ===
The Batllistas won nine of the 15 Colorado seats in the Senate, while the 'Liberty and Justice' wing won five and the 'To serve the country' wing two.

Party	Votes	%	Seats	+/–
Colorado Party	310,390	46.32	15	–4
National Party	208,085	31.05	10	+3
Independent National Party	62,950	9.39	3	0
Civic Union	35,147	5.25	1	0
Communist Party	32,677	4.88	1	+1
Socialist Party	15,731	2.35	0	0
Democratic Party	5,081	0.76	0	New
Total	670,061	100.00	30	0
Registered voters/turnout	994,345	–		
Source: Instituto Factum
