= 1925 Uruguayan general election =

Elections were held in Uruguay on 8 February 1925 for the National Council of Administration and 6 of the 19 members of the Senate. The result was a victory for the National Party, which won 49.3% of the vote.

== Results ==
=== National Council of Administration ===
| Party and lema | | Votes | % | Seats |
|---|---|---|---|---|
| National Party | | 119,255 | 49.30 | 2 |
| Colorado Party | Contra el servicio militar obligatorio | 95,486 | 39.47 | 1 |
| Colorado Party | Colorados riveristas | 16,133 | 6.67 | – |
| Colorado Party | Por la pureza del sufragio | 2,818 | 1.16 | – |
| Colorado Party | Unión colorada de Durazno | 1,038 | 0.43 | – |
| Colorado Party | Colorado Party | 43 | 0.02 | – |
| Colorado Party | Total | 115,518 | 47.75 | 1 |
| Radical Colorado Party | | 7,137 | 2.95 | – |
| Total | | 241,910 | 100.00 | 3 |
| Registered voters/turnout | | 304,005 | – | |

=== Senate ===
| Party | Votes | % | Seats |
|---|---|---|---|
| National Party | 20,744 | 53.76 | 5 |
| Colorado Party | 15,815 | 40.99 | 1 |
| Radical Colorado Party | 2,025 | 5.25 | – |
| Total | 38,584 | 100.00 | 6 |
