= 1954 Uruguayan general election =

General elections were held in Uruguay on 26 November 1954. The National Council of Government, the Chamber of Deputies and the Senate were all elected by a single vote cast by each voter. The result was a victory for the Colorado Party.

Within the Colorado Party, the Batllismo of List 15 won 33 of the party's 51 seats in the Chamber of Deputies while the List 14 faction won 15 and the Blancoacevedistas three. In the Senate, the Batllistas won 16 of the 17 Colorado seats, with the Liberty and Justice wing winning one.

Within the National Party, the Herrerismo faction won 22 of the party's 35 seats in the Chamber of Deputies, while the "White Reconstruction" faction won one, and the Nationalist Popular Movement (a 1953 split from the Herrerismo faction whose management, according to one study, "was characterized by a certain populist intonation, as it showed preferential concern for labor problems and the situation of the passive classes") won 12. In the Senate elections, six of the National Party's 11 seats were won by the Herrerismo faction, one by the "White Reconstruction" faction and four by the Nationalist Popular Movement.

== Results ==
Party	Votes	%	Seats				
Party	Votes	%	NCG	CoD	+/–	Sen	+/–
Colorado Party	444,429	50.55	6	51	–2	17	0
National Party	309,818	35.24	3	35	+4	11	1
Civic Union	44,255	5.03	0	5	+1	1	0
Independent National Party	32,341	3.68	0	3	–4	1	–1
Socialist party	28,704	3.26	0	3	+1	1	1
Communist Party	19,541	2.22	0	2	0	0	0
Anti-Collegiate Front of the People	89	0.01	0	0	New	0	New
Workers' Party	65	0.01	0	0	New	0	New
Total	879,242	100.00	9	99	0	31	+1
Registered voters/turnout	1,295,502	–					
Source: Electoral Court
