= 1917 Uruguayan parliamentary election =

Parliamentary elections were held in Uruguay on 14 January 1917. The Colorado Party won a majority of seats in both the Chamber of Representatives and Senate.

== Results ==
=== Chamber of Representatives ===
Party or lema		Votes	%
Colorado Party	Colorado Party (Batllistas)	63,250	49.37
Colorado Party	Colorado Party (Gral. Rivera)	2,920	2.28
Colorado Party	Total	66,170	51.65
National Party	Civic Nationalist	32,304	25.21
National Party	National Party	28,941	22.59
National Party	Total	61,245	47.80
Socialist Party		703	0.55
Total		128,118	100.00
Source: Bottinelli et al.

=== Senate ===
Party or lema		Votes	%	Seats
Colorado Party	Colorado Party (Batllistas)	37,768	51.92	4
Colorado Party	Colorado Party (Gral. Rivera)	738	1.01	4
Colorado Party	Total	38,506	52.93	4
National Party	Civic Nationalist	21,720	29.86	3
National Party	National Party	11,900	16.36	3
National Party	Total	33,620	46.21	3
Socialist Party		622	0.86	0
Total		72,748	100.00	7
Source: Bottinelli et al.
