= Antonio Rubio Pérez =

Uruguayan journalist and politician (1882–1953)

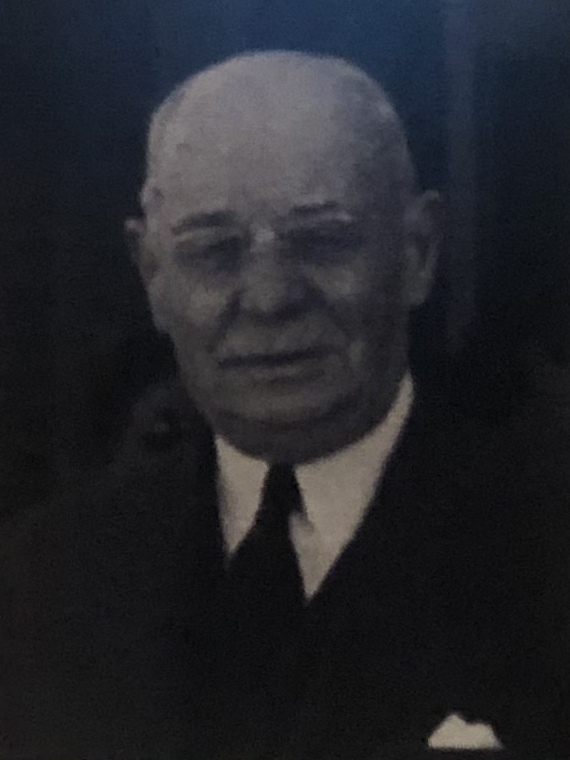
Image of Antonio Rubio Pérez

Antonio Rubio Pérez (Soriano, 1882 – 28 November 1953) was a Uruguayan journalist and politician.

He briefly served as President of the National Council of Administration in 1933. He served as the President of the Chamber of Deputies of Uruguay in 1947.
