= 1950 Uruguayan constitutional referendum =

A constitutional referendum was held in Uruguay on 26 November 1950, The proposed amendments to the constitution were rejected by 99.74% of voters.

== Results ==
Choice	Votes	%
For	2,128	0.26
Against	826,375	99.74
Total	828,403	100
Registered voters/turnout	1,168,206	70.91
Source: Direct Democracy
