= 1925 Bolivian legislative election =

Parliamentary elections were held in Bolivia in May 1925 to elect half the seats of the Chamber Deputies and one-third of the Senate.

== Results ==
Party	Votes	%	Seats					
Party	Votes	%	Chamber			Senate		
Party	Votes	%	Elected	Total	+/–	Elected	Total	+/–
Republican Party			35	70	0	6	16	0
Total			35	70	0	6	16	0
Source: Cáceres

=== Elected members ===
The new senators were:

- Román Paz, PR (Chuquisaca)
- Damián Z. Rejas, PR (Cochabamba)
- Emilio Benavides, PR (Potosí)
- Ramón Rivero, PR (Oruro)
- Francisco Iraizós, PR (La Paz)
- Antonio L. Velasco, PR (Béni)
