= Herrerism =

- Leader: Luis Lacalle Pou
- Ideology: Liberal conservatism
- Political position: Centre-right
- National affiliation: National Party

Herrerism is the centre-right political faction of the National Party of Uruguay.

== History and prominent members ==
Herrerism is named after the leader and founder of the faction, Luis Alberto de Herrera (1873–1959). His grandson, Luis Alberto Lacalle (1941–), President of Uruguay from 1990 to 1995, has long exercised a leading role in the group. Herrera's great-grandson Luis Alberto Lacalle Pou has also been elected president under the sponsorship of the group.

== Ideology ==
The ideology of Herrerism is built on a foundation of economic liberalism and liberal conservatism, although earlier in its history it took on more anti-imperialist and traditionalist policies. Also Herrerism is anti-jacobinist.

== See also ==
- Politics of Uruguay
- National Party (Uruguay)#History
- List of political families#Uruguay
