= Emilio Frugoni =

Uruguayan politician (1880–1969)

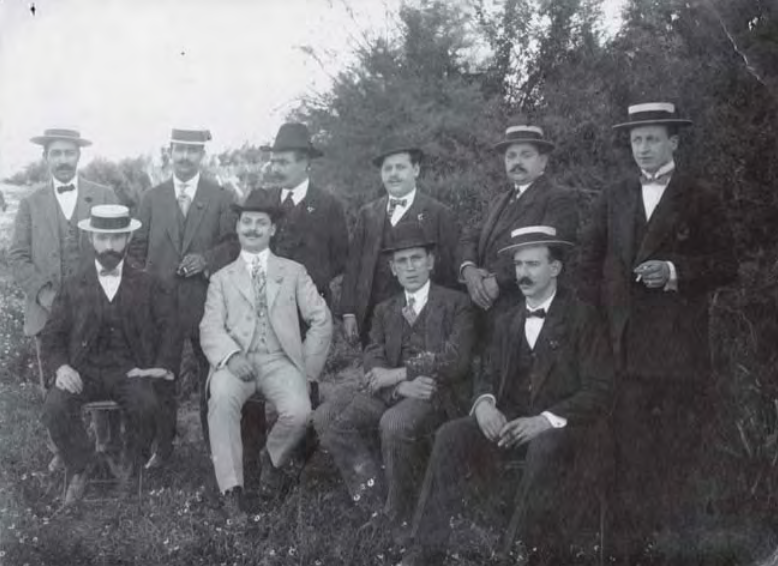
Frugoni (seated, second from left), with the tailors' union, in 1904

Emilio Frugoni Queirolo (March 30, 1880 – August 28, 1969) was a Uruguayan socialist politician, lawyer, poet, essayist, and journalist. He founded the Socialist Party of Uruguay (PS) in 1910 and was its first general secretary, as well as its first representative in the Chamber of Deputies.

== Life ==
=== Early activism ===
Born in Montevideo as one of the four children of Don Domingo Frugoni and Doña Josefina Queirolo, Emilio Frugoni joined José Batlle y Ordóñez's camp during the political fighting in 1904, and rose to the rank of Lieutenant. Upon the end of the conflict, he decided to, in his own words:

"never again get involved in the bloody rivalry [between the Colorado Party and the Blanco Party] (...) in order to open a new road for the political opinions of our people, to distance it from the archaic customs of blanco and colorado traditionalism (...)."

In December 1904, Frugoni wrote his Profesión de fe socialista ("Socialist Testimonial") - which was partly published in the newspaper El Día. This was the start of a process leading to the creation of the PS. A while after that, he commented in his El Socialismo no es la violencia, ni el despojo, ni el reparto ("Socialism Is Not Violence, Nor Plunder, Nor Redistribution"):

"The Socialist Party, which is revolutionary in its goals, is not insurrectional in its means, and does not aim to launch proletarians in a sterile struggle, nor does it seek to place all political power in the hands of the working class before it has worked within peaceful norms allowed by the development of its organization and civic capacity, by the possibility to support itself in the conscious will of the nation (...) we will combat the bourgeois order, the social order, the economical and juridical ones that base themselves on the class inequalities and consecrate them, but we will not alter the "public order" by placing ourselves on the border of legality (...) we will not hold a subversive position in front of our constitutional order."

=== Opposition to dictatorships ===
In 1920, he demanded a Party agreement on its position towards the October Revolution and Bolshevism. In the 1921 Congress, the PS voted to join the Comintern, and turned itself into the Communist Party of Uruguay (PCU); Frugoni refused to adhere to the party line, and refounded the PS as a non-communist group. In the 1928 elections, the PCU obtained 3,911 votes, and the PS 2,931.

He became an opponent of the authoritarian president Gabriel Terra in the 1930s, and was imprisoned, then exiled. Elected deputy in 1934, he had opposed the dictatorship enforced by the legislature, and, upon the swearing in of Terra, declared:

"The oath is worthless, as Dr. Terra has shown he does not carry out his promises."

He walked out of the General Assembly to the PS headquarters as the former was stormed by police forces.

In 1942, Frugoni was named Uruguay's Envoy Extraordinary and Minister Plenipotentiary to the Soviet Union by President Juan José de Amézaga. He resigned his position in 1946 and returned to Montevideo, as he had become a harsh critic of Soviet policies. In La Esfinge Roja (1948), the book containing his experiences, he wrote:

"The fate of the Soviet citizen, and most of all his individual destiny, is suffering a suffocation through the criterion with which the nation is being driven and governed, in the canons of a narrow pseudo-collectivist fanaticism which places its focus only on masses and constantly dismisses the individual (...)."

=== Movimiento Socialista ===
In January 1963, he left the PS over internal disagreements, and created Movimiento Socialista, with which he ran in the elections of 1966. In 1966, he authored an Open Letter to the Socialists; among other things, it stated that "an electoral campaign is nowadays an economical adventure", and showed Frugoni's willingness to contribute his personal wealth.

When the government of Jorge Pacheco Areco outlawed the PS and closed down El Sol and the PS headquarters (La Casa del Pueblo), Frugoni rejected the possibility that the patrimony could pass to the Movimiento Socialista.

After his death, the Movimiento Socialista entered a tight alliance with the PS; nowadays, Frugoni's political thought is integrated in the party line of the PS.

== Works ==
- La Esfinge Roja ("The Red Sphinx")
- Génesis, esencia y fundamentos del Socialismo ("Birth, Essence and Fundaments of Socialism")
- Las tres dimensiones de la democracia ("The Three Dimensions of Democracy")
- De Montevideo a Moscú ("From Montevideo to Moscow")
- Poemas Montevideanos ("Montevideo Poems")
- Ensayos sobre el Marxismo ("Essays on Marxism")
- La revolución del machete ("The Machete Revolution")
