= Eduardo Blanco Acevedo =

Uruguayan politician and physician (1884–1971)

Eduardo Blanco Acevedo (14 March 1884, Montevideo – 7 July 1971) was a Uruguayan political figure and physician.

== Background ==
Son of Juan Carlos Blanco Fernández and Luisa Acevedo, his family was full of prominent personalities in the academic and political fields.

He was a distinguished Uruguayan political figure. He was long associated with the Colorado Party (Uruguay) party. He was father-in-law to President of Uruguay Gabriel Terra.

== Political roles ==
He served in the 1930s as President Gabriel Terra's public health minister.

He served as a Senator in the 1930s and 1940s. He served as the President of the Senate of Uruguay in 1950.

In the 1950s he served as minister for public instruction. From 1952 till 1955 he served at the National Council of Government (Uruguay).

== Death ==
He died in 1971.
