= National Party (Uruguay) =

Political party in Uruguay

National Party Partido Nacional
- Abbreviation: PN
- Leader: Luis Lacalle Pou
- President: Álvaro Delgado
- Founder: Manuel Oribe
- Founded: 10 August 1836; 190 years ago
- Headquarters: Juan Carlos Gómez 1384, Montevideo
- Youth wing: Juventud Partido Nacional
- Ideology: Liberal conservatism; Christian democracy; 1970s: Progressive conservatism
- Political position: Centre-right
- National affiliation: Republican Coalition
- International affiliation: Centrist Democrat International
- Regional affiliation: COPPPAL; Union of Latin American Parties; Christian Democratic Organization of America (observer)
- Colors: Sky Blue and White
- Slogan: La unión nos hará fuerza ("Unity makes strength")
- Anthem: Marcha de Tres Árboles
- Chamber of Deputies: 29 / 99
- Senate: 9 / 30
- Intendencias: 15 / 19
- Mayors: 87 / 125

Party flag

Website
- www.partidonacional.org.uy

The National Party (Spanish: Partido Nacional, PN) also known as the White Party (Spanish: Partido Blanco), is a major political party in Uruguay. Founded in 1836 by General Manuel Oribe, it is one of the country's oldest active political parties along with the Colorado Party, their origin dates back to the establishment of Uruguay as an independent state.

Positioned on the centre-right of the political spectrum, the National Party is ideologically liberal, nationalist, Pan-Americanist and humanist. Considering the interim co-government of the Gobierno del Cerrito headed by Manuel Oribe, and the Defense Government from Montevideo led by the Colorado Joaquín Suarez, in the middle of the Uruguayan Civil War, and with the exception of the administration of Luis Lacalle Pou, the PN has ruled the country for 35 years interruptedly throughout its history. The party has a long tradition of being in the political opposition during the 19th and 20th centuries, against its traditional adversary, the Colorado Party. Although Manuel Oribe is recognized as the party's founder, Aparicio Saravia is considered its idealist and main historical caudillo.

The National Party is a defender of decentralization, and its demographic base skews toward people living in rural areas.

== History ==
Seal of the National Party

The identity of the National Party dates back to 10 August 1836, when the then president Manuel Oribe decreed the use of the white banner with the inscription "Defenders of the Laws", in the battle of Carpintería, Oribe faced the revolutionary army of Fructuoso Rivera and colored badges were used to distinguish between the parties. For this reason, the National Party is also known as the "White Party."

On 7 July 1872, the first Program of Principles was approved, in which respect for freedoms, the maintenance of peace as the supreme good for the nation, the representation of minorities, the decentralization of the country, the strengthening of justice, and the promotion of education and instruction.

In March 2020, National Party's Luis Lacalle Pou was sworn as the new President of Uruguay, meaning Uruguay got the first conservative government after 15 years of left-wing leadership under the Broad Front coalition.

== Ideology and factions ==
Positioned on the center-right of the political spectrum, the Uruguay National Party encompasses both conservative and liberal tendencies. Ideologically, it describes itself as liberal, nationalist, pan-americanist and humanist. Additionally, in the party there is a lack of internal agreement on social issues such as the legalisation of abortion, euthanasia, the age of criminal responsibility and same-sex marriage. However, over time, several sectors and the party's youth wing have demonstrated a favorable position on LGBT rights.

Throughout its history, the National Party has had a strong base of votes in the interior of the country and support from rural voters, due to its historical policy of decentralization of power, compared to the capital's centralist and unitary policy of the Colorado Party.

The National Party is composed of numerous sectors that encompass different ideologies that range from the center-right to the right-wing. The three main factions are the centrist and Christian democratic National Alliance, the economic liberal and conservative Herrerism, and the social-liberal Wilsonist Current.

The conservative wing is the most influential. It dates back to Luis Alberto de Herrera in the early 20th century, and has reproduced a family line of leaders that continued with former president Luis Alberto Lacalle, and has returned to dominate the party, renewing itself generationally through the leadership of his son, Luis Lacalle Pou.

== Electoral history ==
=== Presidential elections ===
Election	Party candidate	Running mate	Votes	%	Votes	%	Result
Election	Party candidate	Running mate	First Round		Second Round		Result
Elections under the Ley de Lemas system
1938			114,506	32.1%	—	—	Lost ✗
1942	Luis Alberto de Herrera	Roberto Berro	129,132	22.5%	—	—	Lost ✗
1942	Turena	Olivera	1,384	0.2%	—	—	Lost ✗
1942		Saraiva	667	0.1%	—	—	Lost ✗
1942	al lema		52	0.0%	—	—	Lost ✗
1942	Total votes		131,235	22.8%	—	—	Lost ✗
1946	Luis Alberto de Herrera	Martín Echegoyen	205,923	31.7%	—	—	Lost ✗
1946	Basilio Muñoz	José Rogelio Fontela	1,479	0.2%	—	—	Lost ✗
1946		Jacinto D. Durán	557	0.1%	—	—	Lost ✗
1946	al lema		161	0.0%	—	—	Lost ✗
1946	Total votes		208,120	47.8%	—	—	Lost ✗
1950	Luis Alberto de Herrera	Martín Echegoyen	253,077	30.7%	—	—	Lost ✗
1950	Salvador Estradé	Emeterio Arrospide	1,421	0.2%	—	—	Lost ✗
1950	al lema		336	0.0%	—	—	Lost ✗
1950	Total votes		254,843	30.9%	—	—	Lost ✗
1966	Martín Echegoyen	Dardo Ortiz	228,309	18.5%	—	—	Lost ✗
1966	Alberto Gallinal Heber	Zeballos	171,618	13.9%	—	—	Lost ✗
1966	Alberto Héber Usher	Nicolás Storace Arrosa	96,772	7.9%	—	—	Lost ✗
1966	al lema		211	0.0%	—	—	Lost ✗
1966	Total votes		496,910	40.3%	—	—	Lost ✗
1971	Wilson Ferreira Aldunate	Carlos Julio Pereyra	439,649	26.4%	—	—	Lost ✗
1971	Mario Aguerrondo	Alberto Héber Usher	228,569	13.7%	—	—	Lost ✗
1971	al lema		211	0.0%	—	—	Lost ✗
1971	Total votes		668,822	40.2%	—	—	Lost ✗
1984	Alberto Zumarán	Gonzalo Aguirre	553,193	29.3	—	—	Lost ✗
1984	Dardo Ortiz		76,014	4.0	—	—	Lost ✗
1984	Juan Carlos Payssé	Cristina Maeso	21,903	1.2	—	—	Lost ✗
1984	al lema		9,657	0.5	—	—	Lost ✗
1984	Total votes		660,767	35.0%	—	—	Lost ✗
1989	Luis Alberto Lacalle		444,839	21,63%	—	—	Elected ✓
1989	Carlos Julio Pereyra		218,656	10,63%	—	—	Lost ✗
1989	Alberto Zumarán		101,046	04,91%	—	—	Lost ✗
1989	Lema		1,449	00,07%	—	—	Lost ✗
1989	Total votes		765,990	37,25%	—	—	Lost ✗
1994	Alberto Volonté		301,655	14.9%	—	—	Lost ✗
1994	Juan Andrés Ramírez		264,255	13.0%	—	—	Lost ✗
1994	Carlos Julio Pereyra		65,650	3.2%	—	—	Lost ✗
1994	Total votes		633,384	31.2%	—	—	Lost ✗
Elections under single presidential candidate per party
1999	Luis Alberto Lacalle		478,980	22.3%	—	—	Lost ✗
2004	Jorge Larrañaga		764,739	34.30%	—	—	Lost ✗
2009	Luis Alberto Lacalle	Jorge Larrañaga	669,942	29.07%	994,510	45.37%	Lost ✗
2014	Luis Lacalle Pou	Jorge Larrañaga	732,601	30.88%	939,074	41.17%	Lost ✗
2019	Luis Lacalle Pou	Beatriz Argimón	696,452	29.70%	1,189,313	50.79%	Elected ✓
2024	Álvaro Delgado	Valeria Ripoll	655,426	28.20%	1,101,296	47.92%	Lost ✗

==== Note ====
Under the electoral system in place at the time called Ley de Lemas system, each political party could have as many as three presidential candidates. The combined result of the votes for a party's candidates determined which party would control the executive branch, and whichever of the winning party's candidates finished in first place would be declared President this system was used form the 1942 election until the 1994 election until in 1996, a referendum amended the constitution to restrict each party to a single presidential candidate, effective from the 1999 elections.

=== Parliamentary elections ===
Election	%	Votes	%	Chamber seats	+/–	Position	Senate seats	±	Position
1916	68,073		46.6%	105 / 218	▲105	▲1st			
1917	29,257		22.7%	Unknown		▼3rd			
1919	71,538		38.0%	56 / 123		▲1st			
1922	116,080		47.1%	58 / 123	▲2	1st			
1925	122,530		45.1%	56 / 123	▼2	1st			
1928	140,940		47.1%	60 / 123	▲4	1st			
1931	133,625		43.2%	55 / 123	▼5	1st			
1933	101,419		41.1%	117 / 284	▲122	▼2nd			
1934	92,903		37.3%	39 / 99	▼138	2nd	15 / 30	▲15	▲2nd
1934	Senate	91,585	41.4%	39 / 99	▼138	2nd	15 / 30	▲15	▲2nd
1938	122,440		32.6%	29 / 99	▼10	2nd	15 / 30	0	2nd
1938	Senate	114,571	31.7%	29 / 99	▼10	2nd	15 / 30	0	2nd
1942	199,265		34.6%	34 / 99	▲5	2nd	7 / 30	▼8	2nd
1942	Senate	131,235	22.8%	34 / 99	▲5	2nd	7 / 30	▼8	2nd
1946	271,037		40.4%	40 / 99	▲6	2nd	10 / 30	▲3	2nd
1946	Senate	208,085	31.1%	40 / 99	▲6	2nd	10 / 30	▲3	2nd
1950	254,788		30.8%	31 / 99	▼9	2nd	10 / 30	0	2nd
1950	Senate	254,834	30.4%	31 / 99	▼9	2nd	10 / 30	0	2nd
1954	309,818		35.2%	35 / 99	▲4	2nd	11 / 31	▲1	2nd
1958	499,425		49.7%	51 / 99	▲16	▲1st	17 / 31	▲6	▲1st
1962	545,029		46.5%	47 / 99	▼4	1st	15 / 31	▼2	1st
1966	496,910		40.3%	41 / 99	▼6	▼2nd	13 / 30	▼2	▼2nd
1971	668,822		40.2%	40 / 99	▼1	2nd	12 / 30	▼1	2nd
1984	660,767		35.1%	35 / 99	▼5	2nd	11 / 30	▼1	2nd
1989	765,990		37.25%	39 / 99	▲4	▲1st	12 / 30	▲1	▲1st
1994	633,384		31.1%	31 / 99	▼8	▼2nd	10 / 31	▼2	▼2nd
1999	478,980		22.3%	22 / 99	▼9	▼3rd	7 / 30	▼3	▼3rd
2004	764,739		34.30%	36 / 99	▲14	▲2nd	11 / 30	▲4	▲2nd
2009	669,942		29.07%	30 / 99	▼6	2nd	9 / 30	▼2	2nd
2014	732,601		30.88%	32 / 99	▲2	2nd	10 / 30	▲1	2nd
2019	696,452		29.70%	30 / 99	▼2	2nd	10 / 30	Steady	2nd
2024	655,426		28.20%	29 / 99	▼1	2nd	9 / 30	▼1	2nd

=== National Council of Administration and National Council of Government elections ===
Election	Votes	%	Council seats	±	Position
1925	119,255	49.3%	Unknown		▲1st
1926	139,959	48.4%	Unknown		1st
1928	141,055	48.2%	Unknown		▼2nd
1930	149,339	47.2%	Unknown		2nd
1932	41,908	26.1%	Unknown		2nd
Abolished in 1933 re-established as National Council of Government
1954	309,818	35.2%	3 / 9	▲3	2nd
1958	499,425	49.7%	6 / 9	▲3	▲1st
1962	545,029	46.5%	6 / 9	Steady	1st
National Council abolished in 1966, presidential system reestablished

==== Note ====
The National Council of Administration ruling alongside the President of the Republic between 1918 and 1933 and it was re-established as National Council of Government was the ruling body in Uruguay between 1952 and 1967.

== See also ==
- Ideas and legacy of Luis Alberto de Herrera
- House Museum of Luis Alberto de Herrera
- Ruralism (Uruguay)
- Battle of Carpintería
