= Colorado Party (Uruguay) =

Political party of Uruguay

Colorado Party Partido Colorado
- Abbreviation: PC
- General Secretary: Andrés Ojeda
- Founder: Fructuoso Rivera
- Founded: 17 September 1836; 190 years ago
- Headquarters: Martínez Trueba 1271, Montevideo
- Ideology: Conservatism; Historical: Liberalism; Republicanism; Batllism
- Political position: Right-wing; Historical: Centre-left
- National affiliation: Republican Coalition
- Regional affiliation: COPPPAL
- Colors: Red, yellow
- Chamber of Deputies: 17 / 99
- Senate: 5 / 30
- Intendencias: 1 / 19
- Mayors: 3 / 125

Party flag

Website
- www.partidocolorado.com.uy

The Colorado Party (Spanish: Partido Colorado, lit. 'Red Party', PC) is a major political party in Uruguay. Founded in 1836 by General Fructuoso Rivera, the first president of Uruguay, it is one of the country's oldest active political parties along with the National Party, their origin dates back to the establishment of Uruguay as an independent state.

Traditionally an ideologically diverse party, it nowadays sits in the centre-right side of the political spectrum. Their current position in the Uruguayan political landscape is conditioned by the coalition they have formed with their historic adversary, the National Party, in opposition to the Broad Front (Frente Amplio), the latter being a leftist coalition formed in the early 1970s that has become, since the 1999 election, the most-voted electoral force in the country, reshaping Uruguayan electoral politics and displacing the Colorado Party from its traditional position of dominance to becoming the third party in the country, behind the National Party.

== Ideology ==
The party seeks to unite moderate and liberal groups, although its members have had a diverse set of ideologies since its foundation, including Krausism and liberal conservatism, as well as general pragmatism. It was the dominant party of government almost without exception during the stabilization of the Uruguayan republic.

The Colorado Party has traditionally been an ideologically diverse party, with one study from the 1950s noting that "the liberal ideological position assumed by the Colorado. a half-century ago under the drive of Batlle has forced the Blancos or Nationalists to become more relatively conservative in position. On the part of both major parties, however, many inconsistencies and many ideological subdivisions, temporary or permanent, occur. Each of the large parties has its conservatives and its liberals, and party lines are often difficult to hold in congressional debate."

== History ==
==== 19th century ====
The origin of the Colorado Party is indissolubly linked to the figure of Fructuoso Rivera, important caudillo and one of the leaders of the Uruguayan independence process. He was also the first president of Uruguay, serving from 1830 to 1834, and in 1836 he led a revolt against the country’s second president, Manuel Oribe. The feud between the two presidents had more to do with issues of personal influence than with clear ideological differences: Oribe had eliminated a government post held by Rivera, from which the latter exercised patronage over the countryside of Uruguay; Oribe’s administration had also accused Rivera’s cabinet of gross corruption and had begun to investigate and prosecute it. The battle that ensued between the followers of the two men, in September 1836, led to the creation of the Colorado (Red) Party and the Blanco (White) Party (followers of Rivera and Oribe, respectively), after the colors that each side wore to the battle. In later decades the Blanco tradition would mesh with other political tendencies to form the National Party.

This face-off between Rivera and Oribe would become the first of many armed confrontations between the Colorado Party and the Blanco Party, which punctuated Uruguayan political history throughout the XIXth century. Given Uruguay’s status as a new nation, and the frailty of its political autonomy, the confrontation between Oribe and Rivera became regionalized and even internationalized when, in 1838-39, Argentine caudillo Juan Manuel de Rosas and his Federalists supported Oribe, while Rivera and his Colorados received the support of the Unitarians faction, as well as Britain and France (all enemies of Rosas).

This entanglement with foreign alliances resulted in a civil war which kept the country divided for almost a decade, and which Uruguayan historiography calls Guerra Grande (“Big War” or “Great War”). Rivera and his Colorados spent most of the 1840s confined to the walled city of Montevideo, sieged by Oribe, who commanded both his Blanco followers and Rosas’ armies.

During the years of siege, the Colorado government of Montevideo became known as the “Defense Government”. During this period, Colorados who had previously supported Rivera (intellectual personalities who belonged to the wealthier classes of Uruguayan society) broke away from the caudillo, who was expelled from the city and self-exiled in southern Brazil. Dependent on their European allies to sustain the war against Rosas and Oribe, these Defense Colorados reaffirmed their adhesion to the latest trends of European liberalism, and began to identify the Colorado movement with notions like respect for constitutional and liberal political order, defense of personal guarantees, separation of powers, and other staples of liberal thought. Meanwhile, they portrayed Oribe and his Blancos as authoritarian henchmen for Rosas, caudillo whom Colorados identified with tyranny and the type of personalist government that was keeping the whole region backwards.

Towards the end of the 1840s France and Britain abandoned the coalition against Rosas, but Colorados were successful in reaching a deal (very onerous to Uruguay) to get the Empire of Brazil into the war against Rosas, in 1851. Some Argentine caudillos changed sides against Rosas around the same time, which led to his defeat in 1852. In Uruguay, Blancos and Colorados reached an agreement, on October 8^{th}, 1851, to declare a peace “without victors nor vanquished”, a sign of the exhaustion both sides were feeling after more than a decade of war.

After the end of the long conflict, there was a desire in the country to keep the peace, and most Blancos and Colorados agreed to attempt a ‘fusionist’ experience of government, where members of both tendencies would govern together. However, there was a small and influential clique of Colorados who disagreed with this course of action and started a ‘Colorado Conservative Party’ (to conserve the liberal traditions of the Defense Government), from which they undermined normal political development in the country, helping in the destabilization of the first post-war government, and then attempting a power grab twice: in 1855 and 1858. That last year they were definitely put down, and the leadership of these hardcore Colorado insurrectionists was executed by government forces. Although the government that decided this fate for the Conservative Colorados was a fusionist one, with representatives from both Blancos and Colorados, and although the man in charge of the executions, Anacleto Medina, had a Colorado background, in Colorado Party tradition the victims of these killings are known as “Martyrs of Quinteros” (since the action happened in a place called Paso de Quinteros), and their memory would serve to justify plenty bloody retribution from Colorados to Blancos in the future.

Attempts at fusionism in Uruguayan politics were brought to an end in the mid-1860s, by the intervention of Venancio Flores, the most powerful caudillo in the Colorado Party after Rivera’s death in 1854. Flores brought Colorados to power through a rebellion supported by Brazil and Argentina, which succeeded in 1864-65. Once established in power, Flores would have Uruguay join the Triple Alliance War against Paraguay, to pay back Brazilian and Argentine support of his rebellion. Flores’ takeover of the country during 1864 led to the Siege of Paysandú, one of the most famous and remembered episodes of the many wars between Blancos and Colorados.

Flores’ government, from 1865 to 1868, inaugurated the era of complete Colorado dominance in Uruguayan national government: there would be no more pretense of trying to integrate or fusion both political traditions (Blancos and Colorados) in a same national administration. Apart from a non-partisan military regime in the late 1870s, headed by Colonel Lorenzo Latorre, Colorados would hold national office uninterruptedly since Flores’ takeover in 1865 until 1959, and their dominance was so unchallenged that a famous XXth century Blanco politician would explain that “Colorado Party is the name Uruguayans had for the government”, while Uruguayan historians who study the Colorado Party of this period regard it as “the Party of Government” or “the Party of the State”. Flores was killed in 1868, circumstantially the same day that Blancos attempted a failed uprising, although his killing was probably engineered by a Colorado competitor, and not the Blancos. In any case, news of Flores’ murder triggered a country-wide killing spree from Colorados towards Blancos, which went on for several days and left at least a couple hundred dead.

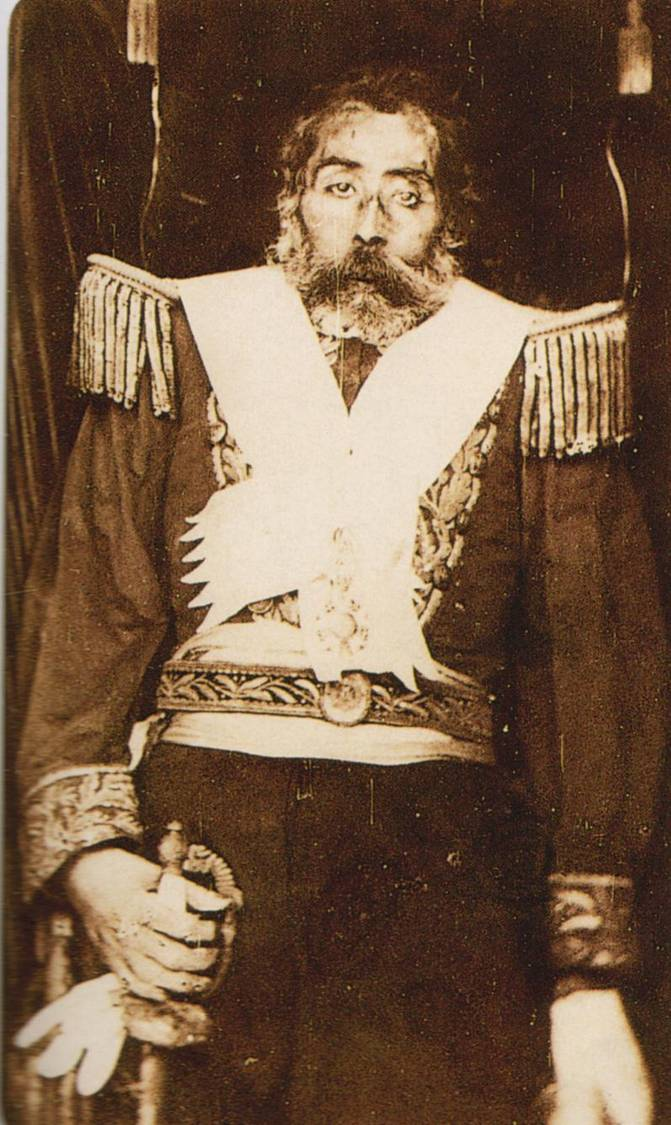
The embalmed corpse of Venancio Flores. According to one version, only his head was embalmed, while the body was discarded (it had rotten in the February heat) and replaced with a straw man.

Flores’ successor in the presidency, Lorenzo Batlle, carried on this Colorado exclusionist practice in government, and suffered an especially vicious civil war for it, the Revolution of the Lances (1870-1872). The war was settled in 1872, by peace agreements which established that Colorados would remain supreme in national office but would respect local Blanco political rule in 4 departments of the country. Uruguayan historians refer to this agreement (which was a verbal understanding, not a binding contract) as the beginning of a ‘co-participation’ period in the history of the relations between Blancos and Colorados.

The years following the end of the war were marked by political turmoil and instability. In those years, a cohort of young and university-educated legislators rose to prominence. They were strongly committed to the principles of liberalism and wished for a Uruguay with constitutional normalcy, electoral regularity and unbreakable respect for individual rights. In their reading of the country’s history, Uruguay had been kept back by the influence of caudillos in national politics, the frequency of the civil wars between them, and the fact that Blancos and Colorados had allowed themselves to be driven by issues of personal rivalry and collective grievances, instead of philosophical principles of government. These principistas (‘principled ones’, as they were called) belonged both to the Blanco and Colorado tradition, and collided with other Blancos and Colorados, who called themselves netos, meaning ‘pure’ (as in unapologetic in their vindication of their respective political traditions and their adherence to a caudillo-like style of politics). This confrontation between two ways of thinking the role and practice of politics came violently to a head in early 1875, when a local election in Montevideo led to a shootout with several dead, both principistas and netos. In the wake of the scandal and indignation provoked by the massacre, José Ellauri, president of the country, resigned, leaving behind a vacuum of power.

This political instability was eventually resolved through a military power grab, deployed in stages during 1875-76, and the country was ruled by military leaders for the next decade and a half. While the first of these military governments, led by Colonel Lorenzo Latorre, was ran without partisan sympathies (nor grievances) and instead focused intensely on the issue of stabilizing the country and guaranteeing the rule of law, the second military government was led by General Máximo Santos, a man who did not hide his belonging to the Colorado tradition, and who became the main figure in Colorado politics during the first half of the 1880s. Liberal Colorados, like Julio Herrera y Obes (a former principista), disputed Santos’ self-appointment as “chief” of the Party, and a revolution against his government (which combined Colorado, Blanco, and independent efforts) was launched and defeated in 1886.

At the end of the military governments, Julio Herrera y Obes was able to become the next president of Uruguay, governing from 1890 to 1894, and he was also successful in getting his dauphin Juan Idiarte Borda elected as his successor in the presidency. During his time as leader of the Party, Julio Herrera y Obes became known as the first ‘civil chief’ of the Party, meaning that he had as much influence as a caudillo, but wasn’t one and didn’t have a military following at his disposal, his authority emanating purely from his ascendancy as a politician. Many Colorado caudillos had been pacified or coopted during the military governments, usually in the form of being incorporated into the Army and placed under an official chain of command instead of being allowed to roam around and act with autonomy.

Juan Idiarte Borda, Herrera y Obes’ successor in the presidency, was assassinated in 1897, in the context of a new Blanco uprising, the Revolution of 1897. Idiarte’s assassination constitutes the only successful magnicide in Uruguayan history so far. He was replaced by Juan Lindolfo Cuestas (then president of the Senate), who reached a peace agreement with Blancos to bring the war to an end (and added 2 departments under Blanco political influence, expanding the 1872 agreements). Cuestas allied other Colorado factions to get away from Herrera y Obes’ influence and secure another term in office. One of Cuestas’ main allies in the political maneuvering necessary to be elected president was José Batlle y Ordóñez, son of previous Colorado president Lorenzo Batlle, and also owner and founder of the biggest newspaper in the country, El Día (“The Day”). Batlle y Ordóñez had been an opponent of both the military governments and Herrera y Obes, who, in power, had developed an elitist and oligarchic view of politics and government versus Batlle’s proposals of radical democratization of Party life and society in general. After the end of Cuestas’ second term, Batlle y Ordóñez was able to sway most Colorados and even some Blancos to elect him president of Uruguay, in 1903. Idiarte Borda’s assassination and Cuestas’ administrations meant Julio Herrera y Obes lost a great deal of influence in the Party, dying penniless in 1912.

==== 20th century ====
Under the leadership of José Batlle y Ordóñez (who was twice president of the country, in 1903-1907 and 1911-1915), Colorados began to espouse causes like social reform and social justice, secularization, statism and expansion of public services, economic nationalism, workers’ rights, women’s rights, and generally the advance of progressive and humanitarian values and the pursuit of social equality through government action. Some of these ideological elements had been present in previous Colorado administrations, some belonged to the times and were present on other parties’ platforms, while others were very particular to Batlle’s personal views about society. In any case, Batlle became the most influential politician to articulate a comprehensive and progressive view of the national future (that it was to be secular, modern, urban, republican, cosmopolitan, radically democratic and radically egalitarian), and to belong to his faction of Colorados meant to personally espouse and, ideally, replicate in personal life this progressive worldview.

Under Batllista-aligned presidencies, Uruguay entered a process of deep political, economic, and social reformism. Creation of state-owned companies and banks, the establishment of state monopolies, labor legislation and the beginnings of a social security system, heavy efforts at secularization of government and society (legalized divorce and government promotion of women’s education, for example), which culminated in the separation of State and Church, and abolition of the death penalty and blood sports, are just some of the examples of the kind of transformations the country endured in this period of Batllista hegemony. Batlle often talked of wanting to make Uruguay “a small model country”, where “the wealthy are a little less wealthy, so the poor can be a little less poor”.

Followers of Batlle y Ordóñez constituted the majority of the Colorado Party for the first 30 years of the century, although Batllista defeat at the 1916 Uruguayan Constitutional Assembly elections meant that after that year Batllistas had to negotiate and compromise with the minority conservative factions of the Colorado Party, and later with their traditional Blanco opponents, in order to legislate and carry government forward. Batllistas would return to hegemony in the Party in the 1940s, as will be seen later.

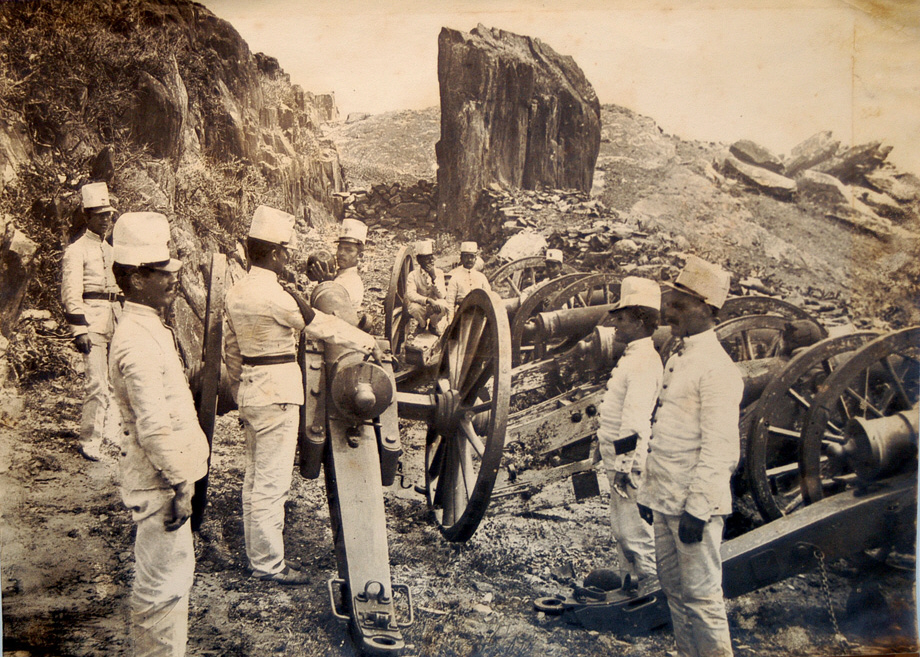
Artillery unit from the government forces, during the 1904 civil war, the last one Colorados and Blancos fought in Uruguayan history.

Batlle was able to exert such a great influence over the Colorado Party not just due to his skills as politician, but also thanks to the severe defeat he inflicted the Blancos in the 1904 civil war, during his first presidency, which gave him an everlasting fame and ascendancy as leader of the Party. The 1904 civil war was the bloodiest (in casualties) of the engagements between Blancos and Colorados and was also the last one: both parties would learn to resolve their differences through the ballot after this event. After their military defeat, Blancos were left in such state of disrepair that it took them several years to reorganize and contest elections again (not to mention that the ‘co-participation’ agreements of 1872 and 1897 were abolished), while Colorados who had earlier been indifferent to Batlle now hailed him as supreme leader of the Party.

Batlle’s leadership was virtually unopposed until the 1910s, when his projects for a reform of the Executive branch of government (he wanted to do away with the office of the presidency and institute a collegiate form of government, believing the presidency to be a “remnant of monarchism”, and proclaiming that “the history of assemblies is the history of liberty”) were met with skepticism by some of his followers and resistance by his opponents. His proposal to install a collegiate form of government was, nominally, Batllismo’s main talking point in the already mentioned 1916 Uruguayan Constitutional Assembly election, although the campaign for the election was mostly dominated by public discussion of the pace and depth of Batllista reformism, with opponents of Batlle proclaiming themselves to be ‘the conservative class’, and accusing Batlle of being a jacobin, an anarchist, or a communist.

The defeat of Batllistas at the 1916 elections led Colorado president Feliciano Viera (1915-1919), until then a faithful disciple of Batlle, to call for a ‘halt on the road’ in 1917, suspending further vigorous Batllista reformism. During the 1920s, electoral races between Blancos and Colorados became increasingly close in their results, and Batllistas prioritized negotiations and appeasement of the minority conservative Colorado factions (known in this time as “Riverismo” and led by Pedro Manini Ríos, who’d once been Batlle’s right-hand man), in order to preserve Party unity and guarantee Colorado continuity in government.

Following Batlle’s death in 1929, Batllistas ran Gabriel Terra as candidate for president in the 1930 general elections, and they succeeded in electing him to office. However, Terra would break with Batllismo in 1933, and govern the country until 1938, both as elected president and as a dictator, in alliance with the rightist elements of the Colorado tradition (the Riveristas), and also with the largest wing of the National Party, the followers of Luis Alberto de Herrera. During the Terrista governments, some Batllista politicians were sent to exile, one was killed under confusing circumstances, and another prominent Batllista figure (Baltasar Brum, who’d been president of the country in the early 1920s) committed suicide as an act of protest and defiance against the coup that was taking place. Batllistas boycotted elections throughout the 1930s, trying to deny legitimacy to the regime.

Terra’s successor in the presidency, Alfredo Baldomir (1938-1943) eventually made peace with the Batllistas, in the context of the Second World War, when Terra’s conservatism and his political allies’ flirtation with fascism ceased to be palatable, while Batllistas, who (following Batlle y Ordóñez’ firm teachings on the matter) had always been defenders of liberal democracy, returned to favor in the political arena. The improvement in the relations between the government and the Batllistas led the latter to suspend their electoral absenteeism and return to the polls.

Colorados won the 1942 elections by a landslide. Batllistas didn’t present a candidate of their own for president and instead supported the neutral Colorado figure of Juan José de Amézaga. Amézaga received 71% of all votes cast for Colorados in the election and became president of the country. His presidency, from 1943-1947, signaled the return of Batllismo to power. Tomás Berreta, a veteran Batllista figure, was elected president of Uruguay in the 1946 elections, confirming Batllismo’s return to power. He was replaced by his vice-president, Luis Batlle Berres (nephew of José Batlle y Ordóñez), in late 1947, when Berreta died in office from an undisclosed cancer. Batlle Berres completed Berreta’s term, governing until 1951. Andrés Martínez Trueba was elected president of Uruguay in the 1950 elections, for the 1951-1955 government term (Martínez Trueba was perceived, at the time, as an ally of Batlle Berres; this would turn out to be incorrect).

Downtown Montevideo covered by mostly Colorado political propaganda, ahead of the 1950 general elections.

By the late 1940s, the Batllista wing of the Colorado Party was so large that it contained many Batllista sub-factions, often in competition and disagreement with each other. The biggest of these sub-factions were the “List 14” and “List 15” sectors. List 14 was managed by two of Batlle y Ordóñez’ sons and presented a more conservative liberal stance on political issues, while List 15 was headed by their cousin, Batlle Berres, and positioned itself firmly to the left of the Uruguayan political spectrum, advocating for heavy government intervention in economic and social matters, and especially for state-led industrialization efforts. The clash between these two factions would have repercussions outside the Party, since in 1951 List 14 Colorados reached an agreement with the National Party to change the Constitution and institute the old Batllista vision of a full collegiate government for Uruguay, with no president at the top of the Executive branch but, instead, a “National Council of Government” of 9 members (6 for the most voted party, 3 for the second most voted party) replacing the presidency. This change was meant to prevent Batlle Berres’ expected return to the presidency in the 1954 elections, forcing him to dissolve his influence in a collective body instead of wielding personal presidential authority. Since Batlle Berres laid claim to be the better leader and interpreter of the Batllista tradition, and since the collegiate reform was an old aspiration of the movement, Batlle Berres couldn’t publicly oppose his cousins’ move, and the constitutional reform went through. In 1954, Colorados won elections again and, indeed, Batlle Berres’ List 15 was the most voted sector of the Party, while the 1951-1955 Colorado administration had seen a preponderance of List 14 Batllistas.

Batllista governments of the 1950s were troubled not just by political infighting but by the beginning of a 20-year-long period of serious and structural economic downturn for Uruguay, which started in the mid-1950s. Inflation was the first main symptom of the economic troubles, and the 1955-1959 Colorado government would suffer greatly from its effects. Colorados and especially the different Batllista factions arrived at the 1958 elections mired in infighting and discordance, while Blancos managed to heal the internal splits they’d cultivated for decades and present a united Blanco front against Colorados. Colorados lost the 1958 elections in a landslide, losing 18 of 19 departments in the country (including Montevideo, a traditional Colorado stronghold); Blancos’ difference with Colorados was of 13% of the votes. Almost a century had elapsed since Flores’ takeover of the country in 1865 (which had inaugurated Colorado dominance in national government), and the mental shock was so profound that, according to one privileged witness, some Army generals offered Batlle Berres the possibility of staging a coup and barring Blancos from taking office, possibility that Batlle Berres furiously dismissed, allegedly kicking the generals out of his office.

Blancos won the 1962 elections too (though by a much smaller margin) and spent 8 years in power (1959-1967). In opposition, Colorados mainly avoided self-criticism, but still underwent several transformations. The List 14 sector morphed into a new political conglomerate, the UCB (Unión Colorada y Batllista, “Colorado and Batllista Union”), which included several Colorado factions (including non-Batllista ones) into a big-tent coalition to oppose List 15 Batllistas. The latter spent the first Blanco government vociferously vindicating the interventionist economic policies they’d implemented back when they were government, and which Blancos had begun to dismantle. The List 15 faction would be thrown into change after Batlle Berres’ unexpected death in 1964 and was further shocked by his son’s (Jorge Batlle) rise to leadership of the sector the following year. Unlike his father, Jorge Batlle rejected the kind of government interventionism traditionally associated to Batllismo and especially his father’s governments, in favor of a more laissez-faire attitude towards government and society. As leader of the List 15, he modernized the ideological agenda of the sector and proposed liberalizing economic measures not too distant from what some of the Blancos had attempted in government: fiscal restraint, wage suppression, budget cuts. Other leaders of the List 15 (like veteran Batllista politician Amílcar Vasconcellos) abandoned the sector after Jorge Batlle’s ascension to leadership, so the once dominant Batllista faction ended up split in several sub-groups.

Colorados won the 1966 elections. The UCB was the most voted faction and their candidate, Óscar Gestido, became president of Uruguay (in the 1966 elections, the Uruguayan people approved a new constitutional reform, ditching the collegiate government and returning to full presidentialism). Gestido died of cardiac arrest 9 months into his presidency, and was replaced by his vice-president, Jorge Pacheco Areco, in December 1967. Under Pacheco, the shift to the right of the political spectrum that Colorados had begun to assume in previous years would be confirmed.

The economic crisis of the 1950s and the deterioration of living conditions for the working population gave way, in the 1960s, to a decade of heavy social unrest and agitation by unions and student groups, as well as political terrorism towards the end of the decade and the first years of the 1970s. Pacheco confronted social mobilization with strong authoritarianism, to the point that Parliament considered to impeach him on more than one occasion for his unconstitutional use of presidential authority, while two thirds of his government elapsed under a state of emergency, so he could have leeway to rule by presidential decree. The UCB supported Pacheco and became his main political base. List 15 Batllistas, under Jorge Batlle, chose to also support Pacheco, given his government applied many of the economic prescriptions that Batlle had introduced to the political debate (like a wage freeze which succeeded, for a while, in stopping inflation, in 1968). Opposition to Pacheco inside the Colorado Party became a minority position, and in the 1971 elections, the sectors backing Pacheco officially became the majority of the Party.

Colorados benefited in the 1971 elections from the split in the opposition vote, between the National Party and the Broad Front, a newly created leftist coalition, which included some Colorados from the weakened leftist wing of Batllismo, like Zelmar Michelini and Alba Roballo, who abandoned the Colorado Party in opposition to the increasing authoritarianism and the changes in economic policy. This split in the vote allowed Colorados to win the elections, although by a razor-thin margin (Blancos accused the government of electoral fraud, but were dismissed). Juan María Bordaberry, the most voted Colorado candidate (he’d been picked and backed by Pacheco), became president of Uruguay, in March 1972. In June 1973 Bordaberry joined the military in a coup that suspended the Constitution and, among other things, banned all political activity in the country. Pacheco supported Bordaberry and the coup, while the Batllista sectors of the Party repudiated it and demanded a return to democratic order, although they discarded the possibility of joining the demonstration that the Broad Front and the largest wing of the National Party were planning against the coup.

The military regime would continue in power in Uruguay until 1985. Colorados remained demobilized for the first years of the regime, only creating a triumvirate in late 1976 to coordinate Party activity in clandestinity. The 1980 election, organized by the military to ask the Uruguayan people to approve a new Constitution for the country, was the first chance Colorados had to return to public activity. For the election, Pacheco and his followers repeated their support for the military, while Batllismo stated their opposition to the proposed constitutional text. Enrique Tarigo and Julio María Sanguinetti were two Colorados from Batllismo who gained public recognition in this period for their opposition to the government’s proposal. The regime’s project was defeated by the electorate. In 1982, the government allowed some political parties to hold internal elections to decide on party authorities. In the Colorado Party election, the Batllista options (identified with varying degrees of opposition to the military rule) overwhelmingly beat the followers of Pacheco. Negotiations between the political parties and the military allowed a return to democracy and civilian control, with elections set for November 1984. Colorados, who campaigned on a “peaceful change” promise, won the elections. Julio María Sanguinetti was the most voted Colorado candidate (beating Pacheco, who also presented his candidacy) and became the first democratically elected president of Uruguay since 1971, taking office on March 1^{st}, 1985.

Colorados would win 3 of the 5 elections celebrated between 1984 and 2004. In general lines, Batllismo returned to its position as the main wing of the Party, although splintered in two distinct factions by the division between the dominant leaderships of Jorge Batlle and Julio María Sanguinetti. Besides, the meaning of what it meant to uphold Batllista ideals changed: while Jorge Batlle only developed further his neoliberal proposals (he wanted to deregulate the economy and sell off all public companies), Sanguinetti attempted a moderate Batllista approach, with a modernizing edge and a social democratic flavor. The split between Batlle and Sanguinetti was formalized when the latter abandoned the List 15 (Batlle’s sector, where Sanguinetti had started his long political life, in the times of Batlle Berres) and started his own Batllista faction, the Foro Batllista (“Batllista Forum”), in 1990.

Followers of Pacheco would continue to represent the decidedly more right-wing faction of the Party. Pacheco’s candidacy was comfortably beaten by Sanguinetti’s in 1984 and widely defeated, again by Sanguinetti, in 1994. The 1989 elections, however, where Batllismo’s candidate was Jorge Batlle and not Sanguinetti, resulted in a virtual tie between Pachequista and Batllista votes in the Party (Colorados lost those elections, and the Blanco Luis Alberto Lacalle became president of Uruguay from 1990 to 1995). Pacheco would die in 1998, after his faction had virtually disappeared following the 1994 defeat.

The gradual but sustained rise in the vote of the Broad Front leftist coalition led the Uruguayan political system, traditionally bipartisan, to split in thirds (the 1994 elections were crucial in that sense: the three parties finished within 1% of each other). During the presidencies of Sanguinetti and Lacalle, Blancos and Colorados practiced a coalition arrangement, providing parliamentary support to each other and integrating opposition members to their cabinets. These coalition arrangements were never stable, and often members of one party would abandon the other party’s administration before the next elections came up. Blancos and Colorados also collaborated in proposing a new constitutional reform, in 1996, which introduced great changes to the country’s electoral system.

==== Present times ====
In the 1999 elections, the Broad Front became the most voted party in the country, with 40% of the votes. However, according to the 1996 reform, more than 50% of the votes were necessary now to achieve victory in the first round of elections. Since no party reached that threshold, a second round of elections (ballotage), to determine the president, was celebrated a month after the first round. Jorge Batlle, with united Colorado and Blanco support, won the ballotage election against the left’s Tabaré Vázquez.

Batlle couldn’t dedicate much time and effort to implement the liberalizing vision he’d always held for Uruguay, since almost his entire presidency was occupied by the handling of the 2002 banking crisis. This crisis was one of the worst in the country’s history, and although in retrospect the government’s handling of the situation has been well regarded by commentators, at the time the government’s association to the economic malaise and to the economic reforms which, in popular opinion, had brought the crisis to the country was inescapable. Colorados would suffer greatly from it, and Batlle ended his presidency being booed in public appearances. In the 2004 elections, Colorados suffered the greatest defeat in their history, plummeting to 10% of the votes (down from the 32% they’d received in the first round of the 1999 elections). The Broad Front won the 2004 elections, in the first round, and Tabaré Vázquez became the first president in Uruguayan history not to belong to the Colorado or Blanco tradition.

After the 2004 defeat, Batllismo declined as a political force within the Party. The long rivalry between Batlle and Sanguinetti had left the movement without a visible generation of younger leaders, and the Colorado Party would spend the next decade and a half under the leadership of Pedro Bordaberry, who embodied the more conservative tendencies of Colorado tradition (Pedro is a son of Juan María Bordaberry, former president and dictator).

Bordaberry formed his own group within the Colorado Party, called Vamos Uruguay (“Let’s go Uruguay”) and from that platform secured the Party’s presidential nomination for the 2009 elections. As leader of the Colorado opposition to the leftist governments, Bordaberry became known for his harsh criticism of the Broad Front’s public safety policies, given the sharp rise in crime the country started to experience in those years. Bordaberry successfully campaigned to enable a vote to reform the Constitution and lower the age at which youths could be held to have criminal responsibility; the vote took place in the 2014 electoral cycle and, although it failed, it garnered 47% of votes, a high turnout for that kind of voluntary-vote proposals.

In the 2009 elections, Bordaberry led the Colorado Party to a promising resurgence: they got 17% of the votes, up from the 10% of 2004. For the 2014 elections, Bordaberry secured the Party’s nomination again, but he wasn’t able to repeat the success that was expected to come of him. Colorados fell to 13% of the votes in 2014; Bordaberry announced his retirement from politics in 2017, though he continued to occupy his Senate seat until the change of legislature in 2020.

Following Bordaberry’s exit, and after a period of reorganization, economist Ernesto Talvi established his leadership over the Party. Talvi created his own group, called Ciudadanos (“Citizens”), from which he secured the 2019 Colorado presidential nomination. Unlike Bordaberry, Talvi practiced a socially liberal message, identifying as a “liberal-progressive” and incorporating several callbacks to the early Batllista tradition in his messaging. In the general elections that year, Colorados lowered their 2014 performance by a half-point, reaching 12.8% of the vote. However, Colorados would return to government when, in the ballotage election, Luis Lacalle Pou, from the National Party, beat the Broad Front’s candidate, Daniel Martínez.

Blancos, Colorados, and other parties of the opposition to the Broad Front formed an alliance known as “Multicolor Coalition” (later rebranded to “Republican Coalition”), platform from which all parties participated in the government of Uruguay from 2020 to 2025, under the leadership of Lacalle Pou’s National Party. Talvi would abandon the government, the Colorado Party, and political activity altogether in July 2020, disenchanted with the world of politics. After his exit, many Colorado politicians vied for the presidential nomination for the 2024 elections, although in the end it was a relative outsider, Andrés Ojeda, who secured the nomination. Bordaberry also returned to political activity for the 2024 elections, although he didn’t contest for the presidential nomination, and instead announced a run for the Senate. Under Ojeda, Colorados improved their electoral performance, garnering 16% of the votes.

Because the National Party’s candidate, Álvaro Delgado, lost the ballotage election of 2024 to the Broad Front’s Yamandú Orsi, Colorados were not able to renovate their experience in government, and returned to opposition, along with the rest of the Republican Coalition. The 16% of votes they received in the 2024 elections grant Colorados the following legislative representation for the 2025-2030 legislature: 5 senators (out of 30), and 17 representatives (out of 99).

== Electoral history ==
=== Presidential elections ===
Election	Party candidate	Running mate	Votes	%	Votes	%	Result
Election	Party candidate	Running mate	First Round		Second Round		Result
Elections under the Ley de Lemas system
1938	Alfredo Baldomir	César Charlone	121,259	33.9%	—	—	Elected ✓
1938	Eduardo Blanco Acevedo	Eugenio Martínez Thedy	97,998	27.4%	—	—	Lost ✗
1938	Lema		54	0.0%	—	—	Lost ✗
1938	Total votes		219,311	61.4%	—	—	Lost ✗
1942	Juan José de Amézaga	Alberto Guani	234,127	40.7%	—	—	Elected ✓
1942	Eduardo Blanco Acevedo	Carlos Vilaró Rubio	74,767	13.0%	—	—	Lost ✗
1942	Williman	Mermot	670	0.1%	—	—	Lost ✗
1942	Lema		66	0.0%	—	—	Lost ✗
1942	Total votes		309,630	57.2%	—	—	Lost ✗
1946	Tomás Berreta	Luis Batlle Berres	185,715	28.6%	—	—	Elected ✓
1946	Rafael Schiaffino	Daniel Castellanos	83,534	12.9%	—	—	Lost ✗
1946	Alfredo Baldomir	Juan Carlos Mussio Fournier	40,875	6.3%	—	—	Lost ✗
1946	Lema		372	0.0%	—	—	Lost ✗
1946	Total votes		310,496	47.8%	—	—	Lost ✗
1950	Andrés Martínez Trueba	Alfeo Brum	161,262	19.6%	—	—	Elected ✓
1950	César Mayo Gutiérrez	Lorenzo Batlle Pacheco	150,930	18.3%	—	—	Lost ✗
1950	Eduardo Blanco Acevedo	Cyro Giambruno	120,949	14.7%	—	—	Lost ✗
1950	Lema		313	0.0%	—	—	Lost ✗
1950	Total votes		433,454	52.6%	—	—	Lost ✗
1966	Óscar Diego Gestido	Jorge Pacheco Areco	262,040	21.3%	—	—	Elected ✓
1966	Jorge Batlle	Julio Lacarte Muró	215,642	17.5%	—	—	Lost ✗
1966	Amílcar Vasconcellos	Renán Rodríguez	77,476	6.3%	—	—	Lost ✗
1966	Zelmar Michelini	Aquiles Lanza	48,992	4.0%	—	—	Lost ✗
1966	Justino Jiménez de Aréchaga	Nilo Berchesi	4,064	0.0%	—	—	Lost ✗
1966	Lema		389	0.0%	—	—	Lost ✗
1966	Total votes		607,633	49.3%	—	—	Lost ✗
1971	Juan María Bordaberry	Jorge Sapelli	379,515	22.8%	—	—	Elected ✓
1971	Jorge Batlle	Renán Rodríguez	242,804	14.6%	—	—	Lost ✗
1971	Amílcar Vasconcellos	Manuel Flores Mora	48,844	2.9%	—	—	Lost ✗
1971	Juan Luis Pintos	Torialli	5,402	0.3%	—	—	Lost ✗
1971	Juan Pedro Ribas	Gorlero	4,025	0.2%	—	—	Lost ✗
1971	Lema		604	0.0%	—	—	Lost ✗
1971	Total votes		681,624	41.0%	—	—	Lost ✗
1984	Julio María Sanguinetti	Enrique Tarigo	588,143	31.2%	—	—	Elected ✓
1984	Jorge Pacheco Areco	Carlos Pirán	183,588	9.7%	—	—	Lost ✗
1984	Lema		5,970	0.3%	—	—	Lost ✗
1984	Total votes		777,701	41.2%	—	—	Lost ✗
1989	Jorge Batlle	Jorge Sanguinetti	291,944	14.20%	—	—	Lost ✗
1989	Jorge Pacheco Areco	Pablo Millor	289,222	14.06%	—	—	Lost ✗
1989	Hugo Fernández Faingold	Enrique Vispo	14,482	0.70%	—	—	Lost ✗
1989	Lema		1,316	0.06%	—	—	Lost ✗
1989	Total votes		596,964	29.03%	—	—	Lost ✗
1994	Julio María Sanguinetti	Hugo Batalla	500,760	24.7%	—	—	Elected ✓
1994	Jorge Batlle	Federico Bouza	102,551	5.1%	—	—	Lost ✗
1994	Jorge Pacheco Areco	Eduardo Ache	51,935	2.6%	—	—	Lost ✗
1994	Total votes		656,426	32.3%	—	—	Lost ✗
Elections under single presidential candidate per party
1999	Jorge Batlle	Luis Antonio Hierro López	703,915	32.8%	1,158,708	54.1%	Elected ✓
2004	Guillermo Stirling	Tabaré Viera	231,036	10.36%	—	—	Lost ✗
2009	Pedro Bordaberry	Hugo de León	392,307	17.02%	—	—	Lost ✗
2014	Pedro Bordaberry	Germán Coutinho	305,699	12.89%	—	—	Lost ✗
2019	Ernesto Talvi	Robert Silva	300,177	12.80%	—	—	Lost ✗
2024	Andres Ojeda	Robert Silva	392,592	16.89%	—	—	Lost ✗

==== Note ====
Under the electoral system in place at the time called Ley de Lemas system, each political party could have as many as three presidential candidates. The combined result of the votes for a party's candidates determined which party would control the executive branch, and whichever of the winning party's candidates finished in first place would be declared President this system was used form the 1942 election until the 1994 election until in 1996, a referendum amended the constitution to restrict each party to a single presidential candidate, effective from the 1999 elections.

=== Chamber of Deputies and Senate elections ===
Election	Votes		%	Chamber seats	+/–	Senate seats	±	Position	Size
1916	60,420		41.2%	87 / 218	▲87				▲2nd
1917	63,617		49.4%	Unknown					▲1st
1919	Ran as various factions, see 1919 Uruguayan parliamentary election								
1922	Ran as various factions, see 1922 Uruguayan parliamentary election								
1925	Ran as various factions, see 1925 Uruguayan parliamentary election								
1928	Ran as various factions, see 1928 Uruguayan general election								
1931	Ran as various factions, see 1931 Uruguayan parliamentary election								
1933	Ran as various factions, see 1933 Uruguayan Constitutional Assembly election								
1934	139,832		56.1%	55 / 99	▼5	15 / 30	▲15		1st
1934	Senate	125,981	57.0%	55 / 99	▼5	15 / 30	▲15		1st
1938	219,362		58.4%	64 / 99	▲9	15 / 30	0		1st
1938	Senate	219,375	60.6%	64 / 99	▲9	15 / 30	0		1st
1942	328,596		57.1%	58 / 99	▼6	19 / 30	▲4		1st
1942	Senate	328,599	57.2%	58 / 99	▼6	19 / 30	▲4		1st
1946	310,556		46.3%	47 / 99	▼11	15 / 30	▼4		1st
1946	Senate	310,390	46.3%	47 / 99	▼11	15 / 30	▼4		1st
1950	433,628		52.3%	53 / 99	▲6	17 / 30	▲2		1st
1950	Senate	433,440	52.9%	53 / 99	▲6	17 / 30	▲2		1st
1954	444,429		50.6%	51 / 99	▼2	17 / 31	0		1st
1958	379,062		37.7%	38 / 99	▼13	12 / 31	▼5		▼2nd
1962	521,231		44.5%	44 / 99	▲6	14 / 31	▲2		2nd
1966	607,633		49.3%	50 / 99	▲6	16 / 30	▲2		2nd
1971	681,624		41.0%	41 / 99	▼9	13 / 30	▼3		▲1st
1984	777,701		41.2%	41 / 99	0	13 / 30	0		1st
1989	596,964		29.03%	30 / 99	▼11	9 / 30	▼4		▼2nd
1994	656,426		32.3%	32 / 99	▲2	11 / 31	▲2		▲1st
1999	703,915		32.8%	33 / 99	▲1	10 / 30	▼1	Coalition (PC–PN)	▼2nd
2004	231,036		10.36%	10 / 99	▼23	3 / 30	▼7	Opposition	▼3rd
2009	392,307		17.02%	17 / 99	▲7	5 / 30	▲2	Opposition	3rd
2014	305,699		12.89%	13 / 99	▼4	4 / 30	▼2	Opposition	3rd
2019	300,177		12.80%	13 / 99	0	4 / 30	0	Coalition (PN–PC–CA–PG–PI)	3rd
2024	392,592		16.89%	17 / 99	▲4	5 / 30	▲1	Opposition	3rd

=== National Council of Administration and National Council of Government elections ===
Election	Votes	%	Council seats	±	Position
1925	Ran as various factions, see 1925 Uruguayan parliamentary election				
1926	Ran as various factions, see 1926 Uruguayan general election				
1928	Ran as various factions, see 1928 Uruguayan general election				
1930	165,069	52.1%	Unknown		1st
1932	107,664	67.0%	Unknown		1st
Abolished in 1933, reestablished as National Council of Government
1954	444,429	50.6%	6 / 9	▲6	1st
1958	379,062	37.7%	3 / 9	▼3	▼2nd
1962	545,029	44.5%	3 / 9	Steady	2nd
National Council abolished in 1966, presidential system reestablished

== See also ==
- Colorado Party (Paraguay)
- National Party (Uruguay)
- Liberalism worldwide
- Battle of Carpintería
- List of liberal parties
- Fructuoso Rivera
- José Batllé y Ordóñez
- Jorge Batlle
- Pedro Bordaberry
- Ernesto Talvi
- Andrés Ojeda
