= Luis Alberto de Herrera =

Uruguayan lawyer, diplomat, journalist and politician

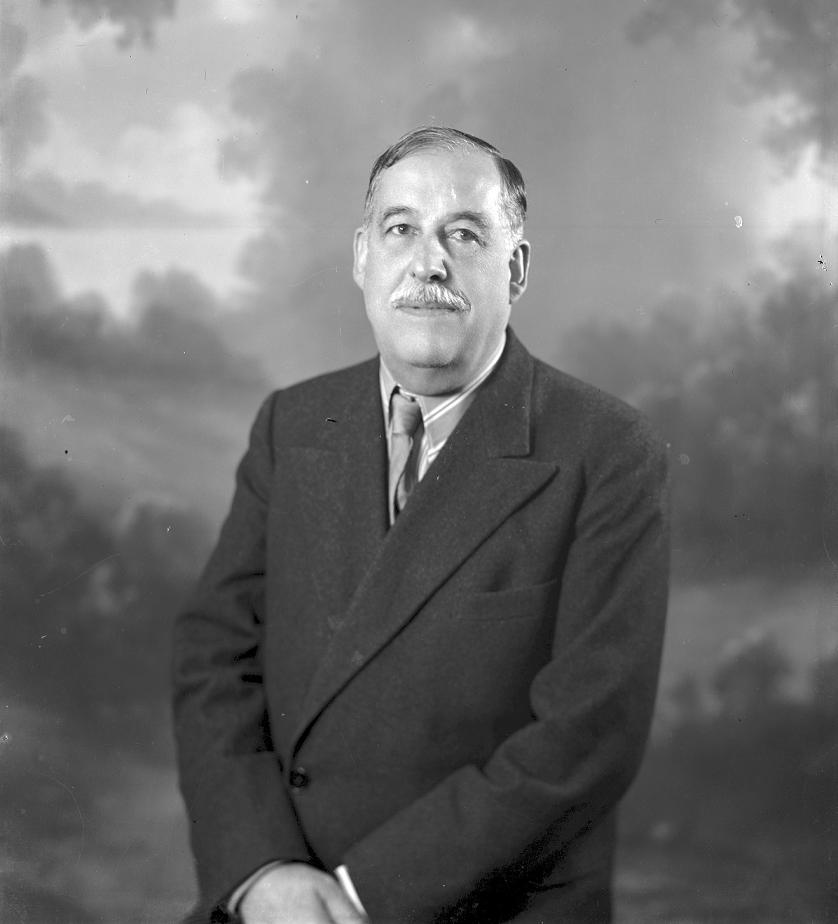
Luis Alberto de Herrera.

Luis Alberto de Herrera (Montevideo, 22 July 1873 – 8 April 1959) was a Uruguayan lawyer, diplomat, journalist and politician.

== Political and diplomatic roles ==
A national leader of great importance during the first half of the 20th century, he led the National Party through the most decisive instances along five decades. His own political movement is known as Herrerismo.

From 1902 to 1904, he was Uruguayan Minister Plenipotentiary to the United States.

From 1925 to 1927 he served as President of the National Council of Administration, or Prime Minister, during the presidency of José Serrato.

In 1933, he took part at the Convention on Rights and Duties of States adopted by the Seventh International Conference of American States. Particularly after 1933, he was tactically close to his nominal Colorado Party opponent, President Gabriel Terra.

He stood for the presidency six times between 1922 and 1950 without success. In 1958, however, he led the Blancos to their first nationwide victory in over 90 years, taking a majority on the National Council of Government. He died shortly afterward.

== Family ==
He was married to Margarita Uriarte (widow of Alberto Heber Jackson) with whom he had one daughter, María Hortensia.

His grandson Luis Alberto Lacalle served as President of Uruguay in 1990–1995; and his great-grandson Luis Alberto Lacalle Pou served as a deputy from 2000 to 2015 and as a senator in 2015 and served as President 2020-2025.

== See also ==
- National Party (Uruguay)#History
- Museo de la Casa de Luis Alberto de Herrera
- List of political families#Uruguay
- Politics of Uruguay

Political offices
Preceded by Julio María Sosa	Prime Minister of Uruguay; 1925–1927	Succeeded by José Batlle y Ordóñez
