= National Council of Administration =

Executive Council of Uruguay from 1919 to 1933

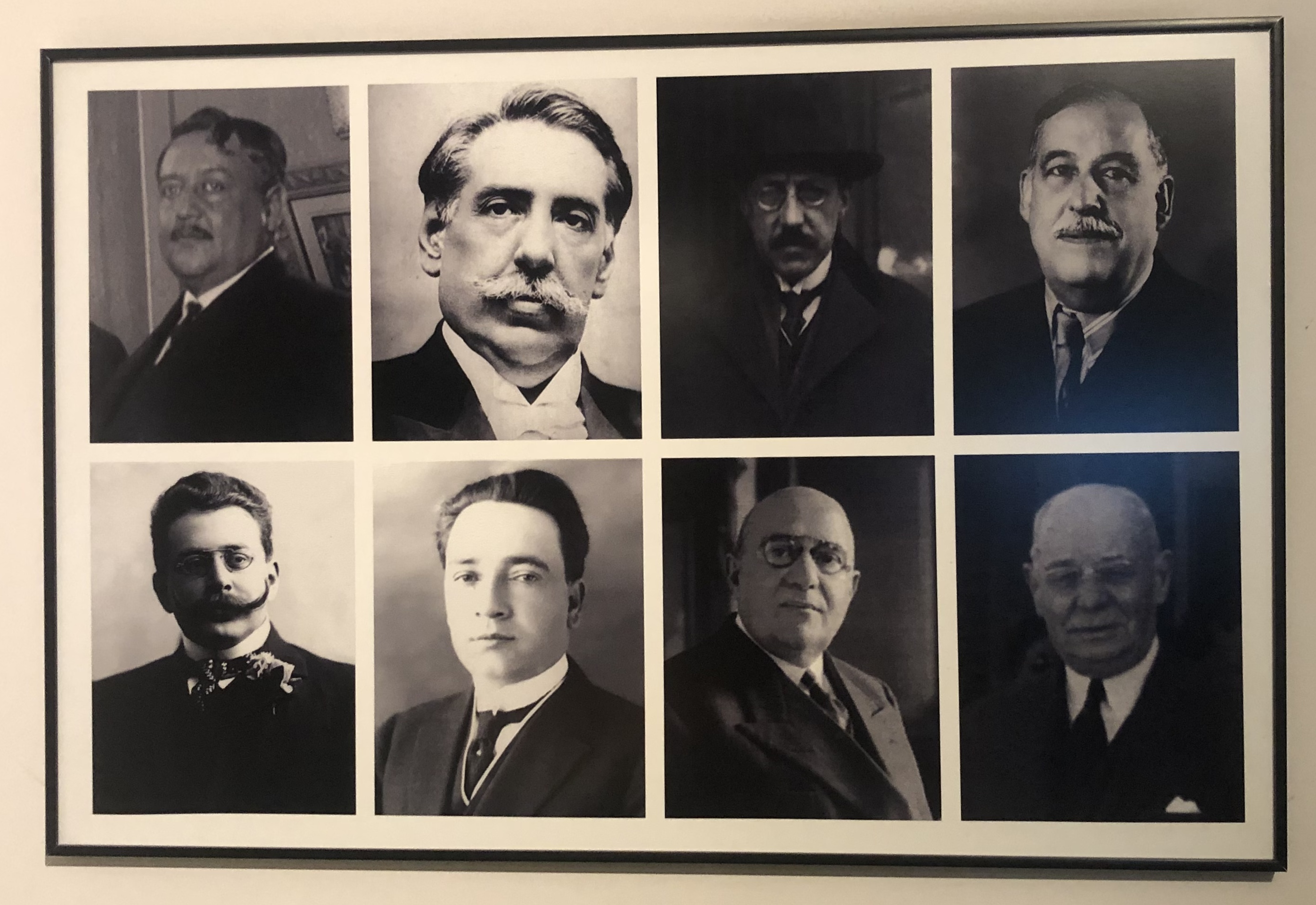
All the presidents of the National Council of Administration. From top left to bottom right: Feliciano Viera, José Batlle y Ordóñez, Julio María Sosa, Luis Alberto de Herrera, Luis Caviglia, Baltasar Brum, Juan Pedro Fabini and Antonio Rubio Pérez

The National Council of Administration (Spanish: Consejo Nacional de Administración) was part of the executive power in Uruguay between 1919 and 1933, ruling alongside the President of the Republic.

The colegiado system was proposed by President José Batlle y Ordóñez during his second term in office, with the aim of creating an executive body similar to the Swiss Federal Council. Batlle had been opposed to the presidential system, believing that a collegiate body would lower the risk of a dictatorship emerging. Although the proposal was unsuccessful in 1916, Batlle negotiated a compromise with the National Party to include the system in a new constitution approved in a 1917 referendum.

The compromise provided for a president and a nine-member National Council of Administration, which consisted of six members of the winning party and also three from the runner-up party. The president was responsible for foreign affairs, national security and agriculture, whilst the NCA oversaw the budget, education, healthcare, industry, industrial relations, labour, livestock and public works. The National Council of Administration had a chairman distinct from the president, making Uruguay the second Latin American country, after Peru, to have a prime minister with the adoption of the 1917 constitution.

Although the new system worked well in its early years, in the early 1930s a series of conflicts involving the council and the president led to a presidential coup by Gabriel Terra in 1933. A new constitution was drawn up, which abolished the National Council of Administration.

== Presidents of the National Council ==
- Feliciano Viera (1919–1921)
- José Batlle y Ordóñez (1921–1923, 1927–1928)
- Julio María Sosa (1923–1925)
- Luis Alberto de Herrera (1925–1927)
- Luis Carlos Caviglia (1928–1929)
- Baltasar Brum (1929–1931)
- Juan Pedro Fabini (1931–1933)
- Antonio Rubio Pérez (March 1933)

== Notable visitors ==
- In December 1928, US President-elect Herbert Hoover addressed the National Council of Administration during his trip through Latin America.

== See also ==
- Checks and balances
- National Council of Government
