= Communist Party of Uruguay =

Political party in Uruguay

Communist Party of Uruguay Partido Comunista del Uruguay
- Leader: Óscar Andrade
- Founded: 21 September 1920; 106 years ago
- Split from: Socialist Party of Uruguay
- Headquarters: Fernández Crespo 2098, Montevideo, Uruguay
- Youth wing: Union of Communist Youth (Uruguay)
- Ideology: Communism
- Political position: Left-wing
- National affiliation: Broad Front
- Regional affiliation: São Paulo Forum
- International affiliation: IMCWP
- Colors: Red, blue, white
- Chamber of Deputies: 5 / 99
- Senate: 2 / 30

Party flag

Website
- www.pcu.org.uy

The Communist Party of Uruguay (Spanish: Partido Comunista del Uruguay, PCU) is a communist party in Uruguay, founded on 21 September 1920 by members of the Socialist Party who had endorsed the October Revolution and the Bolsheviks.

The current secretary-general of the PCU is Óscar Andrade. It is a member of the Broad Front coalition.

== History ==
=== Establishment ===
In 1919, with the advent of the Communist International (Comintern) in Soviet Russia, left-wing members of the Partido Socialista del Uruguay [Socialist Party of Uruguay, PSU] began to agitate for their organization to affiliate with this new Third International. A protracted period of debate ensued, with the leadership unwilling to accept the organization's 21 Conditions for affiliation adopted by the Comintern at its 2nd World Congress in 1920. Despite a "substantial majority of delegates" at the PSU's 8th Congress in September 1920 seeking to affiliate, this leadership resistance proved decisive.

An April 1921 extraordinary congress of the PSU took on the issue head-on, with two motions on the question of international affiliation presented — a first simply ratifying its joining of the Communist Internation and a second ratifying Comintern membership but refusing to accept the 21 conditions. The final vote was not close, with the resolution in favor of unconditional affiliation passing by a vote of 1007 to 110. The majority of delegates, headed by Eugenio Gómez, then voted to formally change the name of the PSU to Partido Comunista del Uruguay (PCU, Communist Party of Uruguay). The organization postdated the time of its birth back to September 1920, the date the majority's desire to join the Comintern was frustrated by the party leadership.

The defeated minority then split the organization, reestablishing the Partido Socialista under the leadership of party founder and member of the Chamber of Deputies Dr. Emilio Frugoni.

=== Labor activity in the 1920s ===
The new Communist Party's leading members hailed from the Uruguayan trade union movement and the party unsurprisingly dedicated considerable effort to the labor movement from the start. A newspaper was launched dedicated to labor issues, El Sindicato Rojo [The Red Trade Union] and efforts began to turn the more radical trade union federation, Comité Pro Unidad Obrera [Committee for Worker Unity, CPUO] from its syndicalist political line towards communism. In 1923 the Communist Party pushed hard to cause CPUO to affiliate with the Red International of Labour Unions ("Profintern," or RILU), only to be defeated when 32 of the 53 trade unions represented in the federation opposed the new international affiliation.

In 1927, leaders of the Communist-supporting unions formed an organization within the Uruguayan Labor Federation called the Bloque de Unidad Obrera [Bloque of Worker Unity], an action which Federation leaders viewed as an act of dual unionism and which led to the expulsion of all unions pledging their allegiance to it. These expelled left wing unions were organized into a new federation, the Confederación General del Trabajo del Uruguay [General Confederation of Labor of Uruguay] in May 1929 — a group which claimed a membership of 14,500 duespayers at the time of its establishment.

=== Political activity in the 1920s ===
The Communist Party first participated in the 1926 Uruguayan general election, with a farmer named Elias Sosa heading the ticket as the party's candidate for president. The party received 3,775 votes for its ticket — about 1.3% of all votes cast.

The Communist Party of Uruguay maintained a youth section, the Liga de Juventudes Comunistas [League of Communist Youth], as well as a number of mass organizations, which in the 1920s included the Anti-Imperialist League, a national branch of International Red Aid (MOPR), and a Red Sports Federation which claimed a membership of 2,000.

According to party statistics published in November 1928 in the newsletter of the Comintern, International Press Correspondence, the membership of the CPU consisted of 80 percent manual workers, with the remaining 20 percent split between white-collar workers and the peasantry.

The Great Depression of the 1930s impacted the economy of Uruguay, which energized the Communist Party. In 1931 Communist member of the Chamber of Deputies Gómez introduced a bill calling for the establishment of unemployment insurance that would provide for daily payments of one peso to unemployed workers. A similar proposal was put forward for the city of Montevideo by Communist city council member Leopoldo Sala, with an additional proposal seeking a reduction of prices of essential product and for the end of all taxation of the unemployed.

=== The Communist Party during the Terra dictatorship ===
In the November 1930 general election, attorney Gabriel Terra, ostensibly the lead candidate of the center-left Colorado Party, was elected to the presidency. Once seated, Terra began almost immediately to show authoritarian tendencies reminiscent of former Socialist Benito Mussolini's fascist rule in Italy. In February 1932, the government closed down the headquarters of the Communist Party of Uruguay and its newspaper, Justicia, claiming that the party was embroiled in a plot to overthrow the government. Terra agitated against the country's 1918 constitution and organized a "March on Montevideo" in April of that year, mobilizing thousands of Uruguayan farmers to the capital in a movement patterned after Mussolini's March on Rome.

On March 31, 1933, Terra launched a coup d'etat with the aid of the National Police and Armed Forces, beginning a period of dictatorship that would run until 1938. Upon seizing power, Terra immediately cracked down on the Communists, raiding the homes of many party leaders, arresting and jailling many. Despite Terra's repressive actions towards the Communist Party, the organization was never formally banned, however, and public meetings continued to be held.

During the 1930s, the Communists were active participating in student demonstrations to retain the independence of the University of Montevideo and were active supporters of the Second Spanish Republic and the war against the fascist movement headed by Francisco Franco in Spain.

=== World War II and after ===
As with other Communist parties around the world, the Communist Party of Uruguay closely followed the political line set in Moscow, dutifully opposing participation in "imperialist" war in Europe during the 1939–1941 period of the Nazi–Soviet Pact before abruptly reversing course and becoming zealous supporters of the Allied effort against Nazi Germany following the invasion of the Soviet Union in June 1941. The Communists were one of few political organizations in Uruguay to support a proposal for conscription in Uruguay — the first such in the nation's history.

As part of the ongoing united front followed by Communist organizations around the world, the Uruguayan party worked to unify the trade union movement in 1942, joining with the unions loyal to their by now hated rivals of the Socialist Party in a new federation, the Unión General de Trabadores [General Union of Workers, UGT]. This unity effort proved short-lived, however, when the spontaneous militance of workers in the meatpacking industry — the nation's largest — in 1943 prompted pro-worker Socialist leaders to split with anti-strike Communist federation leaders, who sought discipline during wartime. Thereafter the UGT as exclusively controlled by the Communist Party, with the organization growing to a claimed membership of 50,000 in 1946.

The Communist Party also fared well electorally, tripling their vote to more than 14,300 (2.5%) in the 1942 Uruguayan general election, with the Communists winning a second seat in the 99-member Chamber of Deputies.

The strong pro-Allied sentiment in Uruguay, combined with positive feelings towards the Soviet Union during the war effort, propelled the Communist Party of Uruguay to apex of size and influence as World War II came to an end. In the November 1946 election, the Communist Party more than doubled its previous vote, with Eugenio Gómez collecting 32,680 votes, more than 5% of total votes cast. The party won five seats in the Chamber of Deputies and its first ever seat in the 31-member Senate during this same general election.

With the eruption of the Cold War, however, Communist support and success fell precipitously. Many small unions bolted the Communist-controlled UGT during the last half of the 1940s, including the Textile Workers' Union, which left after union leader Héctor Rodrígues, a former Communist member of the Chamber of Deputies, was expelled from the party. UGT membership declined from its high-water mark of 50,000 to an estimated 15,000 by the middle of 1954.

Similarly, at the polls the Communist Party suffered a disaster, with its vote total plummeting to just over 19,000 in the November 1950 general election, with 3 of 5 seats in the Chamber of Deputies and the party's sole Senate seat lost. This result was replicated in the November 1954 general election, with the party garnering an unimpressive 2.2% of the vote.

=== Establishment of Leftist Liberation Front ===
In the aftermath of the successful Cuban Revolution of 1959, political horizons seemed to open for the PCU. In the summer of 1962 the PCU founded a mass organization known as Frente Izquierda del Leberación (FIDEL, Leftist Liberation Front). This new organization, which included in addition to PCU members, adherents of other small radical organizations and left-wing students and non-party intellectuals, was met with some electoral success, garnering nearly twice the vote count typically achieved by the Communist Party in the elections of November 1962. The group was successful in electing one seat in the Senate of Uruguay and three places in the Chamber of Representatives.

Due to the country's complex electoral system, designed to limit the voting for minor party candidates, FIDEL did worse than expected in 1966, garnering less than 6 percent of the vote. For 1971, FIDEL joined a new electoral alliance, the Frente Amplio (FA, Broad Front).

The Broad Front, comprising 17 left-wing and anti-government political organizations, performed better in the national election of 1971, winning 18 percent of the vote and seating 18 of its members in the Chamber of Representatives and 5 more in the Senate.

=== Prohibition during the Rightist dictatorship ===
On June 27, 1973, backed by the military, President Juan Bordaberry dissolved the democratically-elected congress by decree, using the presence of FA representatives as a pretext for the overturn of the constitutional order. Without the faintest hint of irony, Bordaberry charged the FA elected officials with "criminal actions of conspiracy against the constitution" during his seizure of power.

The Communist Party of Uruguay was officially banned on December 1, 1973, by the Right-wing dictatorship which had seized power in a June 1973 coup. This marked the first time in the organization's history that it was banned by the government of Uruguay. The organization remain prohibited until the restoration of civilian government and democracy.

With the PCU forced to conduct its activities in secret, subject to police repression, membership plummeted. Only approximately 5,000 members remained in the party's ranks at the time of the March 1, 1985, return of the country to democracy and the rule of law with the assumption of the presidency by Julio María Sanguinetti of the Colorado Party.

=== Renewed participation in Broad Front ===
During the second half of the 1980s, the CPU resumed its participation in the Broad Front electoral group. This alliance gained 21 percent of the vote in the November 1989 elections, nearly half of which represented the PCU candidate list.

The Broad Front became the largest party in the General Assembly of Uruguay in 1999 and became the government in 2004. The Broad Front's candidates for president were elected to office again in 2009 and 2014. None of these were members of the Communist Party of Uruguay, it is worthy of note.

The Broad Front remains the largest party in the country and its candidate for president, Yamandú Orsi, was elected in October 2024 with 52% of the vote.

== Party structure ==
The PCU worked from a national headquarters to oversee provincial subdivisions in each of the country's 19 territorial departments. Before the repression of 1973, the party was governed by a Central Committee consisting of 48 regular members and 27 alternates. Day-to-day operations were handed by a secretariat with a membership of 5.

The party maintained a youth section, Unión de la Juventud Comunista (UJC, Union of Communist Youth), which claimed a membership of 22,000 at the time of the December 1973 coup.

The party also maintained an active role in the leadership of the Uruguayan trade union movement, with several party members serving as top officials of the Convención Nacional de Trabajadores (CNT, National Convention of Workers). The CNT called a general strike in June 1973 in protest of the government's suspension of the constitution, only to be met on June 30 with a ban, forcing the organization into an underground ineffectuality.

After the December 1, 1973, ban on all Marxist parties, the PCU went into hiding, conducting its activities secretively. PCU First Secretary Rodney Arismendi took up residence in the home of a university professor, from which he directed organizational operations until his arrest on May 4, 1974.

According to American State Department estimates, the membership of the PCU in 1965 stood at approximately 10,000. Party membership took a hit with the country's turn to military dictatorship in 1973, with the PCU emerging with just 5,000 members when democracy was finally restored in 1985. Membership recovered with the end of repression and underground operations, however, with the PCU counting 27,000 members by 1989.

=== Publications ===
During the 1920s and 1930s, the Communist Party of Uruguay published a newspaper, Justicia, as well as a labor paper, El Sindicato Rojo [The Red Trade Union].

In addition to books and pamphlet literature, the PCU published a daily newspaper, El Popular (The Peoples’), and a theoretical monthly magazine, Estudios (Studies). Both of these publications were outlawed by the government and did not publish during 1974. In March 1974, an underground weekly called Carta Semanal del Partido Comunistsa (Weekly Letter of the Communist Party) was issued, but its actual publication schedule was irregular and its circulation naturally limited.

== Party congresses ==
PCU 62nd anniversary sticker

Name	Organization	Date
8th Congress	PSU	September 1920
6th Extraordinary Congress	PSU	April 1921
7th Extraordinary Congress	PCU	July 1921
8th Extraordinary Congress	PCU	October 1923
9th Congress	PCU	December 1924
10th Congress	PCU	July 1927
11th Congress	PCU	1930
12th Congress	PCU	January 1938
13th Congress	PCU	March 1940
Extraordinary Congress	PCU	August 1941
14th Congress	PCU	April 1944
15th Congress	PCU	May 1950
16th Congress	PCU	August–Sept. 1955
17th Congress	PCU	August 1958
18th Congress	PCU	June–July 1962
19th Congress	PCU	August 1966
20th Congress	PCU	December 1970
21st Congress	PCU	December 1988
22nd Congress	PCU	October 1990
23rd Congress	PCU	
24th Congress	PCU	June 1996
25th Congress	PCU	November 1998
26th Congress	PCU	December 2001
27th Congress	PCU	
28th Congress	PCU	October 2008
29th Congress	PCU	December 2010
30th Congress	PCU	December 2013
31st Congress	PCU	June 2017
32nd Congress	PCU	May 2022
33rd Congress	PCU	December 2025

== Secretaries-general ==
No.	Name	Term	
No.	Name	Start	End
1	Eugenio Gómez	1920	1955
2	Rodney Arismendi	1955	1973
3	Jaime Pérez (clandestine during the dictatorship)	1973	1974
4	José Luis Massera (clandestine during the dictatorship)	1974	1975
5	Gerardo Cuesta (clandestine during the dictatorship)	1975	1976
6	León Lev (clandestine during the dictatorship)	1976	1979
7	José Pacella (clandestine during the dictatorship)	1979	1981
8	Ramón Cabrera (clandestine during the dictatorship)	1981	1985
9	Rodney Arismendi	1985	1988
10	Jaime Pérez	1988	1992
11	Marina Arismendi	1992	2006
12	Eduardo Lorier	2006	2017
13	Juan Castillo	2017	2025
14	Óscar Andrade	2025	Current
