= Christian Democratic Party of Uruguay =

Political party in Uruguay

Christian Democratic Party of Uruguay Partido Demócrata Cristiano del Uruguay
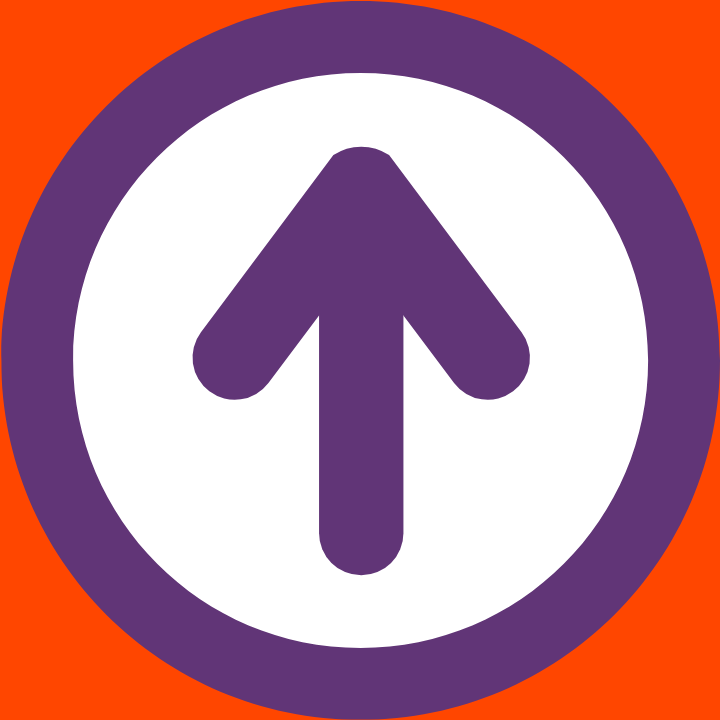
- Founded: 1911
- Headquarters: Aquiles Lanza 1318 bis Montevideo, Uruguay
- Ideology: Christian democracy Social democracy
- Political position: Centre-left
- National affiliation: Broad Front
- Continental affiliation: Christian Democrat Organization of America
- International affiliation: Centrist Democrat International

Party flag

Website
- www.pdcuruguay.uy

The Christian Democratic Party of Uruguay (Spanish: Partido Demócrata Cristiano del Uruguay) was a Uruguayan political party. The party adheres to Christian democracy and social liberalism, and sits on the centre-left of the left-right political spectrum.

== History ==
The party was established in 1911 as the Civic Union, having developed out of the Catholic Party that contested the 1910 elections. In February 1962 it was renamed the Christian Democratic Party. A faction broke away in 1966, initially running under the name Christian Civic Movement, before becoming the Christian Radical Union, and later reclaiming the Civic Union name.

According to a 1956 study, the Civic Union "rejected the concept of statism involved in what it claimed was "Colorado Socialism," although it was willing to accept subsidiary intervention by the State to achieve ends of social justice." Another study noted how the Civic Union "always has been concerned with the welfare of rural Uruguay, and has made concrete legislative contributions to the comparatively few sound policies which have been adopted in that field."

== Affiliation ==
It is part of the governing coalition Broad Front (Frente Amplio). It is a part of the Progressive Alliance, which in turn forms part of the Liber Seregni Front uniting the more moderate centre-left and centrist sectors of the Broad Front.

=== Programme ===
Its platform calls for "a communitarian society" and a "social state", as well as "absolute respect for human life" (including opposition to abortion). It further calls for "alternative forms of production, distribution, consumption and accumulation" that are "superior to capitalist and state-owned enterprises", including:

- a social market economy
- cooperatives
- self-management or self-governing enterprises (autogestión)
- ecological economics
- respect for the commons
- support for the nonprofit sector
