= Alfredo Carbonell Debali =

Uruguayan lawyer and diplomat

Uruguay Ambassador to the Holy See
- In office 1954–1961
- President: Andrés Martínez Trueba (1951–1955); Luis Batlle Berres (1955–1956); Alberto Fermín Zubiría (1956–1957); Arturo Lezama (1957–1958); Carlos Fischer (1958–1959); Martín Echegoyen (1959–1960); Benito Nardone (1960–1961)

Uruguayan Envoy to the Holy See
- In office 1947–1954
- President: Luis Batlle Berres (1947–1951); Andrés Martínez Trueba (1951–1955)

Chargé D'Affaires at the Uruguayan Embassy in Bern
- In office 1931–1937
- President: Gabriel Terra

Alfredo Carbonell Debali was a Uruguayan lawyer and diplomat.

In the decade of 1930 he was chargé d'affaires at the Uruguayan embassy in Bern. In July 1938 he took part at the Évian Conference.

Later, in 1947, he was appointed Ambassador to the Holy See.
