= Permanent Representative of Uruguay to the United Nations =

Coordinates: 40.752524°N 73.966261°W

Ambassador of Uruguay to Headquarters of the United Nations
- Inaugural holder: Enrique Rodríguez Fabregat
- Formation: 1947

The Uruguayan permanent representative in New York City is the official representative to the Headquarters of the United Nations.

== List of representatives ==
Diplomatic accreditation	Permanent Representative	Observations	President of Uruguay	Secretary-General of the United Nations	Term end
1947	Enrique Rodríguez Fabregat		Tomás Berreta	Trygve Halvdan Lie	1961
1962	Carlos María Velázquez		Faustino Harrison	U Thant	1965
1965	Héctor Payssé Reyes		Washington Beltrán	U Thant	1966
1966	Pedro P. Berro		Alberto Héber Usher	U Thant	1969
1969	Augusto Legnani		Jorge Pacheco Areco	U Thant	1971
1972	Carlos Giambruno		Juan María Bordaberry	Kurt Waldheim	1977
1977	Edmundo Narancio		Aparicio Méndez	Kurt Waldheim	1980
1982	Juan Carlos Blanco Estradé		Gregorio Álvarez	Javier Pérez de Cuéllar	1985
1985	Julio César Lapinacci		Julio María Sanguinetti	Javier Pérez de Cuéllar	1987
1987	Felipe Paolillo		Julio María Sanguinetti	Javier Pérez de Cuéllar	1990
1990	Ramiro Piriz Ballon		Luis Alberto Lacalle	Javier Pérez de Cuéllar	1995
1995	Jorge Pérez Otermin		Julio María Sanguinetti	Boutros Boutros-Ghali	2000
August 23, 2000	Felipe H. Paolillo		Jorge Batlle Ibáñez	Kofi Annan	2005
2005	Alejandro Artuccio		Tabaré Vázquez	Kofi Annan	2006
2006	Elbio O. Rosselli		Tabaré Vázquez	Kofi Annan	2008
2008	José Luis Cancela		Tabaré Vázquez	Ban Ki-moon	2013
2014	Gonzalo Koncke		José Mujica	Ban Ki-moon	2015
