= List of ambassadors of China to Uruguay =

Coordinates: 34.889983°S 56.062381°W

Chinese Ambassador to Uruguay
- Incumbent; Wang Gang
- Inaugural holder: Hu Ching-yu
- Formation: 1957; 69 years ago

The Chinese ambassador to Uruguay is the official representative of the People's Republic of China to the Oriental Republic of Uruguay.

== List of representatives ==
Diplomatic agrément/Diplomatic accreditation	Ambassador	Chinese language zh:中国驻乌拉圭大使列表	Observations	Premier of the Republic of China (1958-88) / Premier of the People's Republic of China (1988 to Present)	List of presidents of Uruguay	Term end
1958			The governments in Taipei and Montevideo established of diplomatic relations.	Yu Hung-Chun	National Council of Government (Uruguay)	
1957	Hu Ching-yu	zh:胡庆育	With residence in Buenos Aires Chinese Ambassador to Argentina	Yu Hung-Chun	National Council of Government (Uruguay)	1958
1958	Tan Shao- hua	谭绍华	With residence in Buenos Aires	Chen Cheng	National Council of Government (Uruguay)	1959
1959	Sheng Yueh	zh:盛岳	The Executive Yuan finalized the draft cultural convention between the Republic of China and Uruguay and named Minister to Uruguay Sheng Yueh as plenipotentiary for the signing of the convention.	Chen Cheng	Carlos Fischer	1962
July 5, 1962			The mission of the Republic of China in Uruguay was upgraded to an embassy, he was ambassador to Uruguay.	Chen Cheng	Faustino Harrison	
1966	Hoo Shih-hsi	zh:胡世熙	Hu Shih-hsi	Yen Chia-kan	Alberto Héber Usher	1970
1970	Li Chin	zh:李琴	In August 1970, the Chinese Ambassador to Saudi Arabia, Li Chin, was reassigned as Ambassador to Uruguay.	Yen Chia-kan	Jorge Pacheco Areco	1973
1973	Chen Hsing-Fei	zh:陈雄飞	Tchen Hiong-fei	Chiang Ching-kuo	Juan María Bordaberry	1980
1981	Konsin Shah	夏功权	(born 1920) After Mr. Hsia Kung-chuan was appointed ROC ambassador to Uruguay in 1981, Hsia Kung-chuan	Sun Yun-suan	Gregorio Álvarez	1984
1985	Henry Wang	zh:王肇元	New Taiwan ambassador to Uruguay Henry Wang, Director of the Department of Information and Cultural Affairs under the Foreign Ministry, has been appointed new Republic of China ambassador to Uruguay.	Yu Kuo-hwa	Julio María Sanguinetti	1988
February 3, 1988			The governments in Beijing and Montevideo established diplomatic relations.	Li Peng	Julio María Sanguinetti	
August 1988	Yang Xuqiang	zh:杨许强		Li Peng	Julio María Sanguinetti	
May 1993	Xie Rumao	zh:谢汝茂		Li Peng	Luis Alberto Lacalle Herrera	March 1993
September 1996	Tang Mingxin	zh:汤铭新		Li Peng	Julio María Sanguinetti	September 1996
February 1999	Wang Zhen (PRC diplomat)	zh:王珍 (外交官)		Zhu Rongji	Julio María Sanguinetti	February 1999
August 2000	Huo Shuzhen	zh:霍淑珍		Zhu Rongji	Jorge Batlle Ibáñez	April 2000
December 2002	Wang Yongzhan	zh:王永占		Zhu Rongji	Jorge Batlle Ibáñez	January 2003
March 2006	Wang Xiaoyuan	zh:汪晓源		Wen Jiabao	Tabaré Vázquez	February 2006
November 2007	Li Zhongliang	zh:李仲良		Wen Jiabao	Tabaré Vázquez	November 2007
November 2010	Qu Shengwu	zh:屈生武		Wen Jiabao	José Mujica	October 2010
April 2013	Yan Banghua	zh:严邦华		Li Keqiang	José Mujica	February 2013
December 2015	Dong Xiaojun	zh:董晓军		Li Keqiang	Tabaré Vázquez	December 2015
March 2018	Wang Gang	王刚		Li Keqiang	Tabaré Vázquez	March 2023

== See also ==
- China–Uruguay relations
