= Constitution of Uruguay of 1997 =

Amended Uruguayan Constitution

The 1997 Constitution of Uruguay refers to the 1967 Constitution with amendments.

Its actual name should be: the Constitution of the Oriental Republic of Uruguay, with the amendments as approved in popular plebiscites of 26 November 1989, of 26 November 1994, of 8 December 1996, and of 31 October 2004. The most relevant of them was that of 1996, which came into force in the following year; due to its changes to the electoral system, it is usually considered a new Constitution, the country's seventh (following those of 1830, 1918, 1934, 1942, 1952 and 1967).

== Overview ==
Until the 1994 general election, all the elective posts were voted on the same day, and there were multiple presidential candidacies in every party (the so-called Ley de Lemas). Starting in 1999, mid-year primary elections were held at the beginning of the electoral cycle, in order to elect single presidential candidates for every party. General elections for both the president and the General Assembly are held in October. If no presidential candidate scores at least 50% of all votes cast, a second round of voting is held in November. Finally, in May of the following year, there are municipal elections.

== Referendum ==
On 26 October 2014, alongside the general election, Uruguay held a constitutional referendum on a proposed amendment to article 43 of the Constitution, lowering the age of criminal responsibility from 18 to 16. In the end, this proposal narrowly failed its approval.

== See also ==
- Constitution of Uruguay
- 1996 Uruguayan constitutional referendum
- Primary election
- Runoff election
