= Luis Giannattasio =

Uruguayan political figure

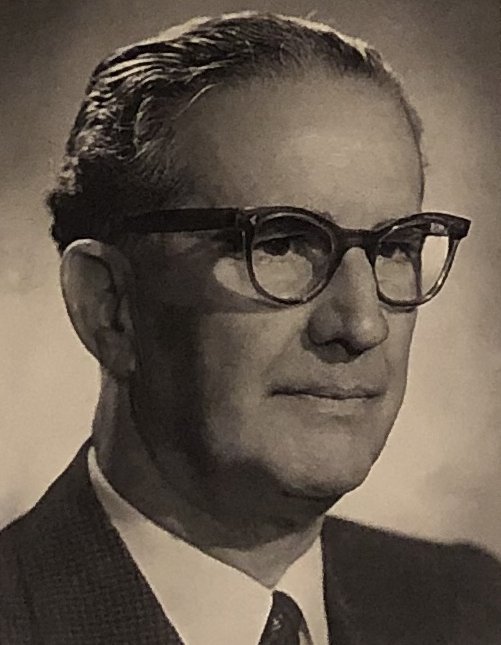

President of the National Council of Government of Uruguay
- In office 1 March 1964 – 7 February 1965
- Preceded by: Daniel Fernández Crespo
- Succeeded by: Washington Beltrán

Minister of Public Works
- In office 1 March 1959 – 28 February 1963
- President: Martín Echegoyen; Benito Nardone; Eduardo Víctor Haedo; Faustino Harrison
- Preceded by: Florentino Guimaraens
- Succeeded by: Isidoro Vejo Rodríguez

Personal details
- Born: Luis Giannattasio Finocchietti; 19 November 1894 Montevideo, Uruguay
- Died: 7 February 1965 (aged 70) Punta del Este, Uruguay
- Political party: National Party
- Occupation: Engineer

Luis Giannattasio Finocchietti (19 November 1894 – 7 February 1965) was a Uruguayan political figure.

== Biography ==
Giannattasio was educated at the University of the Republic in Montevideo and the Massachusetts Institute of Technology in the United States. After graduating as an engineer, he founded the engineering company Giannattasio & Berta (later renamed Ingeniería Civil); the company would be responsible for projects such as the main building of The British Schools of Montevideo in Carrasco, which opened in 1964, and the building of the Banco de la República Oriental del Uruguay on Avenida 18 de Julio in downtown Montevideo.

Giannattasio later worked for the World Health Organization. A member of the National Party, he was appointed Minister of Public Works in 1959, an office which he held until 1963. In this capacity, he was particularly identified with a significant road-building program.

In 1962 Giannattasio was elected a member of the National Council of Government. He became President of the body in 1964, succeeding his National Party colleague Daniel Fernández Crespo. Prominent members of Giannattasio's administration included Minister of Health Aparicio Méndez, who would later serve as President.

In February 1965, Giannattasio died in office of a heart attack in Punta del Este, shortly after attending the funeral of Winston Churchill in London. He was succeeded as President of the National Council of Government by Washington Beltrán, also of the National Party.

== Legacy ==
A road in Canelones Department is named after Giannattasio.

== Honours and awards ==
- (France) Grand Cross of the Legion of Honour (8 October 1964)

== See also ==
- Politics of Uruguay
- The British Schools of Montevideo#History
- List of political families#Uruguay

Political offices
Preceded by Daniel Fernández Crespo	President of the Uruguayan National Council of Government; 1964–1965	Succeeded by Washington Beltrán
