= Constitution of Uruguay of 1967 =

Sixth Uruguayan constitution, in force from 1967 to 1997

The sixth Constitution of Uruguay came into force in 1967.

Approved in a referendum on 27 November 1966, it replaced the previous constitutional text, which had been in force since 1952.

== History ==
In the elections of November 27, 1966, nearly 59 percent of Uruguayans voted to amend the 1952 constitution and to reestablish a presidential system of government, thus ending a fifteen-year experiment with the colegiado. The new constitution, which became operative on February 15, 1967, and has remained in effect since then, created a strong one-person presidency, subject to legislative and judicial checks. In free and fair elections, Uruguayans approved the new charter and elected the Colorado Party to power again.

The 1967 constitution contained many of the provisions of the 1952 charter. However, it removed some of the General Assembly's power to initiate legislation and provided for automatic approval of bills under certain conditions if the legislature failed to act. If, on receiving a bill, the president had objections or comments to make, the bill had to be returned to the General Assembly within ten days. If sixty days elapsed without a decision by the General Assembly, the president's objections had to be considered as accepted. The 1967 document also established the Permanent Commission, composed of four senators and seven representatives, which exercised certain legislative functions while the General Assembly was in recess.

The 1967 charter could be amended by any of four different methods. First, 10 percent of the citizens who were registered to vote could initiate an amendment if they presented a detailed proposal to the president of the General Assembly. Second, two-fifths of the full membership of the General Assembly could approve a proposal presented to the president of the General Assembly and submitted to a plebiscite at the next election (a yes vote of an absolute majority of the full membership of the General Assembly was required, and this majority had to represent at least 35 percent of all registered voters). Third, senators, representatives, and the president of the republic could present proposed amendments, which had to be approved by an absolute majority of the full membership of the General Assembly. And finally, amendments could be made by constitutional laws requiring the approval of two-thirds of the full membership of each chamber of the General Assembly in the same legislative period.

== Authoritarianism, dictatorship and aftermath ==
During the presidential term of Jorge Pacheco Areco (1968–1972), a peculiar instrument was applied time after time, the prompt security measures (medidas prontas de seguridad). As a result, the country was in a sort of permanent state of emergency, which further deteriorated into authoritarianism. The next president, Juan María Bordaberry, faced huge challenges from the military which ultimately led to the 1973 coup d'état. The 1967 Constitution was practically suppressed during all the civic-military dictatorship of Uruguay.

After democratically elected President Julio María Sanguinetti assumed power on 1 March 1985, the Constitution was back in vigor. And soon afterwards started an ever-lasting demand for constitutional reform. However, most of the articles of this constitutional text are still in force nowadays; there have been four successive important amendments: in 1989, 1994, 1996, and 2004. The most relevant of them was that of 1996, which came into force on the following year; due to its changes to the electoral system, it is usually considered a new Constitution, known as the Constitution of 1997.

== See also ==
- Constitution of Uruguay
- Constitution of Uruguay of 1997
- 1966 Uruguayan constitutional referendum

== Bibliography ==
- Gross Espiell, Héctor y Juan J. Arteaga (1992). Evolución Constitucional del Uruguay (in Spanish). Montevideo: Fundación de Cultura Universitaria.
- Gross Espiell, Héctor (1993). Revista uruguaya de Derecho Constitucional y Político (in Spanish). Montevideo.
- Gross Espiell, Héctor (2003). Evolución constitucional del Uruguay (in Spanish). Montevideo: Fundación de Cultura Universitaria.
- Korzeniak, José (2000). Curso de Derecho Constitucional (in Spanish). Montevideo: Fundación de Cultura Universitaria.
- Lopresti, Roberto P. (2007). Constituciones del Mercosur (in Spanish). Buenos Aires: Editorial La Ley. ISBN 978-987-03-1077-8.
- Méndez Vives, Enrique (1998). Historia Uruguaya. Tomo 5 (in Spanish). Montevideo: Santillana.
- Nahum, Benjamín (1996). Manual de Historia del Uruguay. Tomo I: 1830-1903 (in Spanish). Montevideo: Ediciones de la Banda Oriental. ISBN 9974-1-0233-2.
- Pérez Pérez, Alberto (1997). Constitución de 1967 de la República Oriental del Uruguay (in Spanish). Montevideo: Fundación de Cultura Universitaria. ISBN 9974-2-0119-5.
