= List of ambassadors of Uruguay to Chile =

Coordinates: 33.429187°S 70.610411°W

Ambassador of Uruguay to Chile
- Coat of arms of Uruguay
- Inaugural holder: José Arrieta
- Formation: 1871

The Uruguayan ambassador in Santiago de Chile is the official representative of the Government in Montevideo to the Government of Chile.

== List of representatives ==
Diplomatic agrément/Diplomatic accreditation	Ambassador	Observations	List of presidents of Uruguay	List of presidents of Chile	Term end
1871	José Arrieta		Lorenzo Batlle y Grau	Federico Errázuriz Zañartu	
1883	José Arrieta		Máximo Santos	Domingo Santa María González	
1909	Juan Lindolfo de los Reyes Cuestas York (1837 – 1905)		Claudio Williman	Pedro Montt Montt	
1916	Manuel B. Otero		Feliciano Viera	Juan Luis Sanfuentes Andonaegui	
1918	Dionisio Ramos Montero		Feliciano Viera	Juan Luis Sanfuentes Andonaegui	
1921	Eugenio Martínez Thedy	(* August 8, 1885 in Salto, Uruguay) Minister plenipotentiary to Chile, 1920-1934. Delegate, Pan American Conference, Santiago de Chile, 1923, Lima, 1938, Chaco peace conference, 1936, Interamerican Conference for Maintenance of Peace, Buenos Aires, 1936. Acting minister of interior, 1934. Uruguayan ambassador to Argentina, 1934. 1948: Uruguayan ambassador to Peru.	Baltasar Brum	Arturo Alessandri Palma	1924
1935	Luis Enrique Azarola Gil	(* 1882)	Gabriel Terra	Carlos Dávila	
1936	Carlos María de Santiago		Gabriel Terra	Carlos Dávila	
1942	Hugo V. De Pena		Alfredo Baldomir	Juan Antonio Ríos Morales	
1957	José G. Lissidini		Alberto Fermín Zubiría	Carlos Ibáñez del Campo	
1960	Álvaro R. Vázquez		Benito Nardone	Jorge Alessandri Rodríguez	
1963	Julio César Vignale		Daniel Fernández Crespo	Jorge Alessandri Rodríguez	
1969	Aireliano Aguirre		Jorge Pacheco Areco	Eduardo Frei Montalva	
1970	Manuel Sánchez Morales		Jorge Pacheco Areco	Salvador Allende Gossens	
1973	Roberto González Casal		Juan María Bordaberry	Augusto Pinochet Ugarte	
1978	Dante Paladini Mainenti		Aparicio Méndez	Augusto Pinochet Ugarte	
1982	Julio César Lupinacci Gabriel		Gregorio Álvarez	Augusto Pinochet Ugarte	
1985	Alfredo Bianchi Palazzo		Julio María Sanguinetti	Augusto Pinochet Ugarte	
1986	Nicolás Moreno		Julio María Sanguinetti	Augusto Pinochet Ugarte	
1990	José María Alzamora da Cámara Canto		Luis Alberto Lacalle Herrera	Patricio Aylwin Azócar	
1994	Juan Bautista Oddone Silveira		Luis Alberto Lacalle	Eduardo Frei Ruiz-Tagle	
2000	Alejandro Lorenzo y Losada		Jorge Batlle Ibáñez	Ricardo Lagos Escobar	
2005	Carlos Pita (politician)		Tabaré Vázquez	Ricardo Lagos Escobar	March 1, 2010
March 1, 2010	Pedro Vaz (diplomat)		José Mujica	Sebastián Piñera	December 6, 2012
May 1, 2013	Rodolfo Camarosano Bersani		José Mujica	Sebastián Piñera	June 25, 2018
June 25, 2018	Alberto Leopoldo Fajardo Klappenbach		Tabaré Vázquez	Sebastián Piñera	2020
