= Matilde Ibáñez Tálice =

First Lady of Uruguay

Matilde Ibáñez

First Lady of Uruguay
- In office August 2, 1947 – March 1, 1951
- President: Luis Batlle Berres
- Preceded by: Juanita Etchemendy
- Succeeded by: María Aída Serra Serra

Personal details
- Born: Matilde Ibáñez Tálice; March 3, 1907 Buenos Aires, Argentina
- Died: September 4, 2002 (aged 95) Montevideo, Uruguay
- Resting place: Central Cemetery of Montevideo
- Party: Colorado
- Spouse: Luis Batlle Berres (m. 1927)
- Children: Jorge; Luis; Matilde
- Parents: León Ibáñez Saavedra; Elvira Tálice Parodi

Matilde Ibáñez Tálice (3 March 1907 – 4 September 2002) was the First Lady of Uruguay from 1947 to 1951, as the wife of President Luis Batlle Berres. Ibáñez is also the mother of Jorge Batlle Ibáñez, who served as president from 2000 until 2005.

== Biography ==
Matilde Ibáñez Tálice was born in Buenos Aires to the Argentine León Ibáñez Saavedra, who was a descendant of Cornelio Saavedra, and the Uruguayan Elvira Tálice Parodi. In 1927 she married the young politician Luis Batlle Berres, they had three children: Jorge (future President of Uruguay), Luis and Matilde. During the dictatorship of Gabriel Terra, the Batlle-Ibáñez family had to go to exile in Argentina.

In 1947, her husband assumed as Vice President of Uruguay; the early death of President Tomás Berreta meant that Batlle Berres was sworn in as president, and Ibáñez became First Lady.

Half a century later, her son Jorge was elected President of Uruguay (2000–2005). She died in 2002 and was buried at the Central Cemetery, Montevideo.
