= Washington Beltrán Barbat =

Uruguayan political figure and journalist

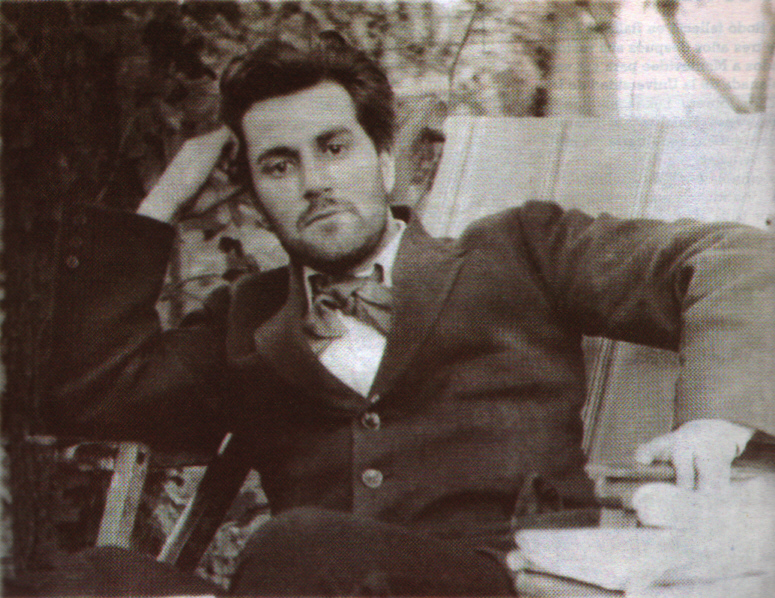
Washington Beltrán Barbat

Washington Beltrán Barbat (February 7, 1885 – April 2, 1920) was a Uruguayan political figure and journalist.

== Background and career ==
Originally from Tacuarembó, Beltrán moved to Montevideo and became a lawyer and a prolific journalist and writer. He co-founded the El País newspaper in 1918.

His son, Washington Beltrán Mullin, lawyer and journalist, was to serve as president of the National Council of Government 1965-1966. Another of his sons, Enrique, was also a notable politician.

== Deputy ==
Beltrán was elected to serve as a deputy and became a prominent member of the National (Blanco) Party. He was noted for his effectiveness at giving political speeches.

== Death ==
In 1920, Washington Beltrán Barbat was killed in a pistol duel with former President of Uruguay José Batlle y Ordóñez.

== See also ==
- Politics of Uruguay
- List of political families in Uruguay
