= Giannattasio =

Giannattasio is an Italian surname. Notable people with the surname include:

- Carmen Giannattasio (born 1975), Italian opera singer
- Luis Giannattasio (1894–1965), Uruguayan politician
- Pasquale Giannattasio (1941–2002), Italian sprinter
