= Constitution of 1997 =

Constitution of 1997 may refer to:

- Constitution of Fiji of 1997
- Constitution of Poland of 1997
- Constitution of Thailand of 1997
- Constitution of Uruguay of 1997
