= Andrés Martínez Trueba =

President of Uruguay

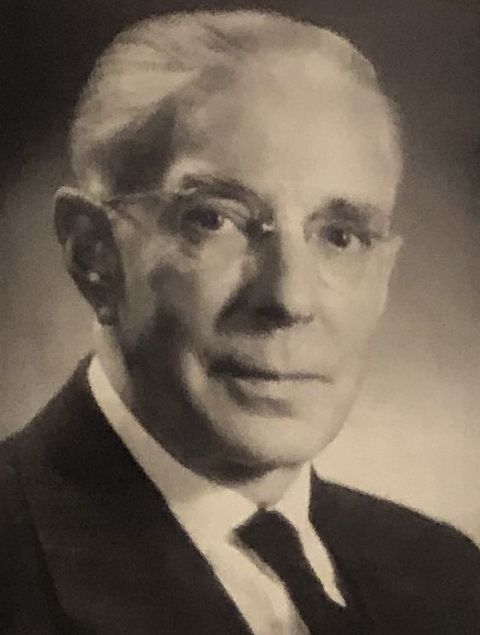
- President Andrés Martínez

31st President of Uruguay
- In office March 1, 1951 – March 1, 1952
- Vice President: Alfeo Brum
- Preceded by: Luis Batlle Berres
- Succeeded by: National Council of Government

President of the National Council of Government
- In office March 1, 1952 – March 1, 1955
- Preceded by: himself as President
- Succeeded by: Luis Batlle Berres

Personal details
- Born: 11 February 1884 Montevideo, Uruguay
- Died: 19 December 1959 (aged 75) Montevideo, Uruguay
- Party: Colorado Party
- Education: University of the Republic
- Occupation: Politician
- Profession: Chemical, Professor

Andrés Martínez Trueba (11 February 1884 – 19 December 1959) was the President of Uruguay from 1951 to 1955.

== Background ==
Martínez Trueba was born in Montevideo and grew up in the Peñarol area, graduating from university with a degree in pharmaceutical chemistry.

== Earlier career ==
He pursued a career as an army officer, and was a member of the Colorado Party, which ruled Uruguay for long periods. His combined army and Colorado Party links may be said to anticipate the sizeable support by members of the Colorado Party for the civilian-military administration of 1973-1985.

He later became a deputy in 1919 and Secretary-General of the Batllist Party (a faction of the Colorado Party) in 1926. Trueba came to lead a commission of 25 parliamentarians whose work culminated in the creation of an Electoral Court in 1924. Before its establishment, according to one observer, “electoral processes were attended by an extremely small percentage of citizens, in epics where fraud and violence were commonplace.”

Between 1928 and 1933 Trueba held several government posts including Director of the State Mortgage Bank, Director of the Electoral Court, and Director of the Pension Fund. He also served as a member of the National Council in 1932, but was interned following a coup in 1933. In 1942, Trueba served as a member of the Council of State that worked on constitutional reform.

Trueba also served as Mayor of Montevideo from 1947 to 1948, and as president of the Banco de la República Oriental del Uruguay from 1948 to 1950.

Trueba was outspoken on agricultural issues, concluding a series of lectures on agrarian reform organized by the Club del Banco Hipotecario in December 1943. From the time of his inauguration at the Mortgage Bank of Uruguay (which had been, until 1945, the main bureaucratic body for public land policy), Trueba had (as noted by one observer) “a thorough understanding of the agrarian situation, particularly regarding the actions of the Rural Development and Colonization Section, which until then had governed public land policies.” The agricultural situation in Uruguay was described from three perspectives. The first was the depopulation of the country with a low population density, the second was (as one observer noted) “a certain presumption that the end of the war would have negative consequences for the country's integration into international markets, which would require some transformations in agricultural production,” and the third referred to the difficulties the State had experienced with agrarian colonization policies as a result of a low budget. Amounting to 5 million pesos, Trueba believed that this amount was very small compared to what was being spent in Argentina for similar purposes. A land reform law was eventually passed in 1948.

== President of Uruguay ==
He succeeded Luis Batlle as President of Uruguay from 1951 to 1952, as part of the Colorado Party. The Vice President of Uruguay during his period of office was Alfeo Brum, who had also served in that office under Luis Batlle Berres in his first term. In 1952 the new Constitution created the National Council of Government (Uruguay) (or colegiado), and Martínez Trueba presided over it till 1955.

== Political reform ==
Early his presidency, Trueba played a major part in the establishment of the colegiado. Following his election as president, Trueba reached out to the followers of National Party leader Luis Alberto de Herrera, resulting in agreement to push ahead with constitutional reform and make the colegiado a reality. The proposal was backed by Herrera who, despite opposing a collegial system in the past, believed it would give him the opportunity to enter government. In the subsequent 1951 Uruguayan constitutional referendum, voters narrowly supported the change to the colegiado system. While most voters in Montevideo rejected the changes, it is suggested that Herrera’s influence led to the majority of votes in the country’s interior being cast in favor of the proposal, which determined the outcome. According to one biographer, Herrera argued “Yes, to enter the neighbor's chicken coop and eat some of his chickens... The Collegiate, to enter it and file the nails of this regime that owns all the levers of power, to weaken the adversary and to have, without fear and with determination, the victory that we deserve.” The colegiado proposal was also supported the Batlle Pacheco brothers, the sons of José Batlle y Ordóñez, who himself believed in a colegiado system for Uruguay. By contrast, a number of Batllistas from a faction led by Luis Batlle Berres opposed the colegiado, believing at the time that it was a maneuver to stop a second Batlle Berres presidency. Batlle Berres was himself opposed to the colegiado, arguing (as noted by one observer) that “while the Batllistas have long favored a “pluripersonal” executive, they have not favored a body composed of members of many parties.”

Trueba strongly supported the colegiado as he was afraid (as one observer put it ) “that the policy of entrusting executive power to one man was too great a temptation to an unscrupulous man to seize power and establish a dictatorship.” There was opposition to the colegiado from right-wing Colorados who believed that it was “hard enough to obtain a decision from one man, the President, and that it would be nine times harder to obtain decisions from nine men.” These opponents also argued that after paying lip-service to the colegiado the Blancos would try to obtain power, which Trueba and his supporters countered by pointing out the consistent electoral victories of their party since 1865.

Trueba came to regard the colegiado as more efficient than the single-member presidency while the representation in the executive of the opposition (as noted by one study) “prevented it from attacking all executive actions in order to make political capital from any controversial decisions.”

== Social reform ==
A member of the liberal Batllista wing of the Colorado Party, Trueba presided over a wide range of reforms during his time in office. The number of school canteens and school milk services increased, as well as school psychology services, and new classes for handicapped children were opened. a 1951 law set up minimum wages and job categories for shearing. An Act of June the 25th 1952 granted wider powers to the Honorary Commission for the Administration of the Permanent National Fund (Comision Honoraria Administradora del Fondo Nacional Permanente) in connexion with a campaign against TB. This commission was authorized to construct and equip hospitals, sanatoria and other facilities for preventing and treating TB in accordance with plans prepared in consultation with the Public Health Ministry, to acquire and equip (as noted by one study) “ mobile dispensaries for use in carrying out more intensive measures throughout the country with regard to publicity, prophylaxis, vaccination and investigation for the purpose of preventing tuberculosis,” and to repair and reconstruct dwellings to be used for treating TB patients. A law of December the 2nd 1952 established a 44 hour workweek for office employees. An Act of December the 19th 1952 authorized changes (as noted by one study) “in the computation of retirement pensions of civil servants wrongfully dismissed.”

An Act of March the 27th 1953 provided, as one study noted, “that any person who is effectively settled in the country shall be entitled to treatment free of charge in the establishments of the Ministry of Health if his aggregate income from all sources does not exceed the limit to be laid down annually by the Executive Power.” Another Act introduced on March the 27th 1953 set up a special fund for the payment of special compensation to public officials. An Act of September the 18th 1953 repealed (as noted by one study) “an earlier provision under which the costs of hospitalization, medical treatment, etc., could be recovered from persons in receipt of old age pensions.” An Act of August the 14th 1953 established a retirement benefit scheme for the staff of private establishments for commercial, artistic, scientific, industrial and technical education. An Act of November the 27th 1953 set up a special retirement benefit for those insured with the Retirement and Survivors’ Pensions Fund for Industry and Commerce, an Act of November the 28th 1953 set up a special retirement benefit scheme for women, and two Acts introduced on December the 4th 1953 set up an anticipated retirement pension scheme (as noted by one study) “for women insured with the Retirement and Survivors’ Pension Funds for Industry and Commerce, and for Banking.” Also in 1953, pension eligibility conditions for working women became more liberal than those for working men, and a law was passed to meet the requirements of the banking retirement fund, which in accordance with the BHU administered funds for housing loans.

An Act of September the 15th 1954 laid down, as noted by one study, “that interdepartmental buses shall transport free of charge, as standing passengers, pupils attending state rural and suburban schools.” A decree of March the 30th 1954 included telegrapher’s cramp among occupational diseases, while an Act of February the 26th 1954 repealed a provision (as noted by one study) “which prevented workers in the cold-storage industry, wool warehousing and similar undertakings from receiving both insurance allowances and paid leave.” An Act of December the 28th 1954 set up a system for “promoting the re-employment of dismissed cold storage workers.” In addition, various laws were passed in 1954 that introduced new retirement benefits or extended existing ones to more categories of workers. That same year, several laws were passed that ratified International Labor Organization conventions on various labor rights such as the right to fair remuneration, the right to work, the right to limitation of working hours, the right to wage protection, the right of working women and working mothers to protection, the right to protection of young persons in employment, and the right to hygienic and safe working conditions, the right of workers to organize, the right of workers to protection against occupational accidents and occupational diseases, and the right to annual holidays with pay and the right to rest. Also in 1954, family allowances were extended to rural workers. A pension fund was also set up for university professionals while a law was passed that, as noted by one study, “finally included all workers in the private sector in social security.” As a result, death, invalidity and old age pensions were provided for all workers.

An Act of January the 4th 1955 set up and regulated sickness benefits payable to workmen and employees of the Compania Uruguaya de Transportes Colectivos Sociedad Anonima. In terms of housing, a decree was issued on January the 4th 1955 (as noted by one study) "to enact regulations governing certain tax exemptions granted for the purpose of encouraging construction." On February the 16th 1955, a decree was issued that provided for the establishment of a leprosy control centre under the Ministry of Health. A decree of January the 25th 1955 established the Safety Council for State Agencies; aimed partly at ensuring the safety of workers employed in municipal and government sub-divisions. A Decree of February the 23rd 1955 established the Industrial Safety Training Centre, the purpose of which was (as noted by one study) "to provide the broadest possible instruction in methods of preventing industrial accidents."

== Economic difficulties ==
Despite the social achievements of the Trueba years, Uruguay faced both international and domestic problems. A protectionist international policy was launched that reduced the prices of meat and wool and triggered (as noted by one observer) “an inflationary process, a loss of real wages, and, as a logical consequence, social and union unrest.” In March 1952, a decree was issued that provided for prompt security measures to deal with a situation that arise from a strike of employees of the Ministry of Public Health (this decree was repealed less than 2 weeks later), and in September a similar decree was issued that provided for prompt security to deal with a situation arising from strikes or stoppages in public services. Batlle Berres was critical of the government’s actions, writing “No to security measures; yes to free and broad discussion with the workers." However, an Act introduced on January the 7th 1954, as noted by one study, “declared an amnesty for public service employees and workers guilty of collective stoppage of work.”

== Post-government ==
President Andrés Martínez Trueba was himself succeeded by Batlle Berres on the latter’s assuming as President of the National Council of Government.

Trueba later retired from politics, and died in December 1959, aged 75.

== See also ==
- Constitution of Uruguay of 1952
- Politics of Uruguay

Political offices
Preceded by Luis Batlle	President of Uruguay; 1951–1955	Succeeded by Luis Batlle
