= Banred =

Automatic teller machines in Uruguay

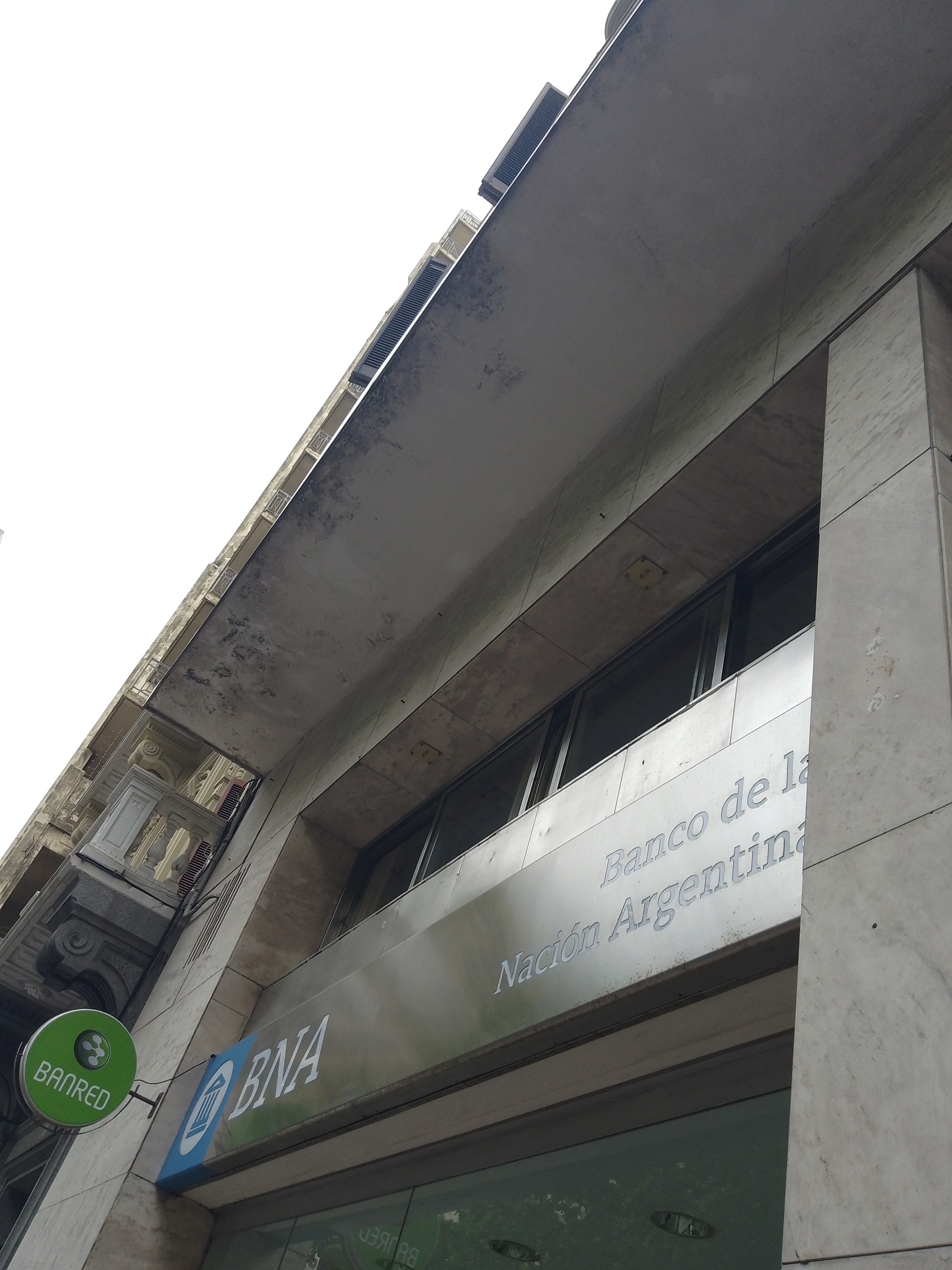
- Operating area: Uruguay
- ATMs: over 330 (2007)
- Website: www.banred.com.uy

Banred is a network of automated teller machines (ATMs) in Uruguay with over 330 locations. It used to be two separate networks, RedBanc and Bancomat, which merged in 2005.

Most private banks are members of the Banred network, including BBVA, Itaú, Santander and Scotiabank. its main competitor is RedBROU, owned by state bank BROU.
