= Lupinacci =

Lupinacci is a surname of Italian origin. Notable people with the surname include:

- Chad A. Lupinacci (born 1979), American politician
- Ercole Lupinacci (1933–2016), Italian Greek-Catholic bishop
- Julio César Lupinacci Gabriel (1928–2008), Uruguayan diplomat
