= Alfeo Brum =

Uruguayan politician and lawyer (1898–1972)

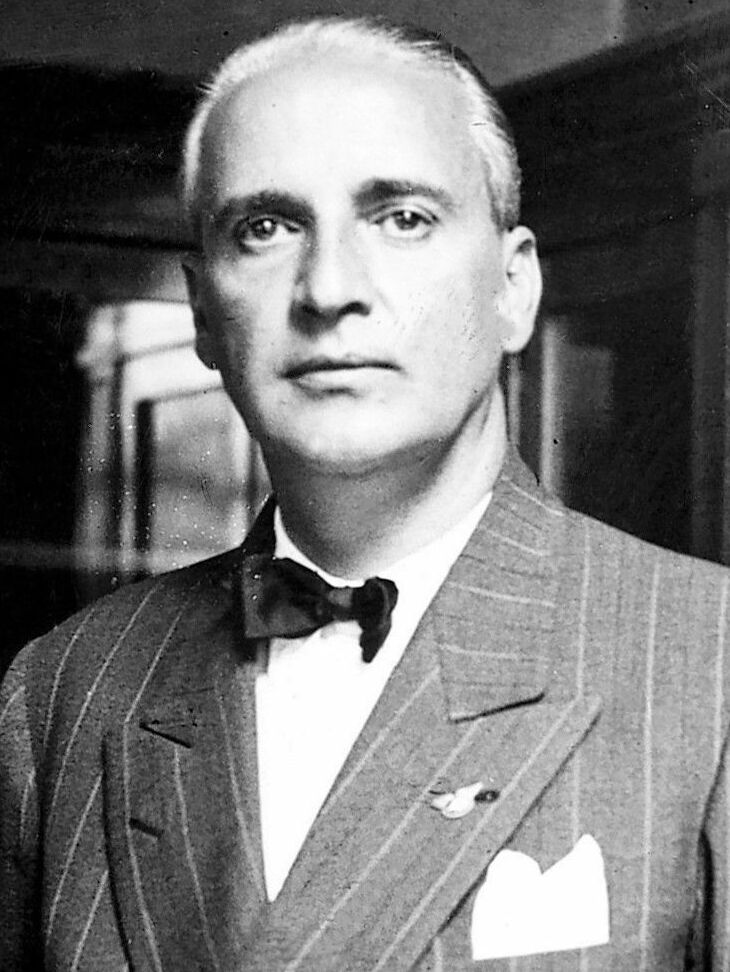
- Brum in 1947

5th Vice President of Uruguay
- In office 2 August 1947 – 1 March 1952
- President: Luis Batlle Berres (1947-1951); Andrés Martínez Trueba (1951-1952)
- Preceded by: Luis Batlle Berres
- Succeeded by: Himself (as President of the Senate); Jorge Pacheco Areco (as Vice President, 1967)

Personal details
- Born: 22 March 1898 Salto, Uruguay
- Died: 25 February 1972 (aged 73) Montevideo, Uruguay
- Party: Colorado Party
- Spouse: María Josefina Requena Cordero
- Education: University of the Republic
- Profession: Politician, Lawyer

Alfeo Brum (22 March 1898 – 25 February 1972) was an Uruguayan politician and lawyer. He was Vice-President of Uruguay from 1947 to 1951 and 1951 to 1952, noted for being the longest consecutively serving Vice-President in Uruguay's history. Brum was the only person who served two successive terms as Vice President of Uruguay and was the fifth person to hold the office.

== Background ==
Alfeo Brum was born in Salto on 22 March 1898. He was a younger brother of President Baltasar Brum. He studied law, and became a lawyer. From his youth, he was a member of the Colorado Party.

== Early political career ==
Alfeo Brum was elected as Representative from the department of Artigas, and represented Artigas for three consecutive terms starting with 1923 and ending in 1932.

On 1 March 1933, he became a Senator. On March 31, President Gabriel Terra dissolved the parliament. Former President Baltasar Brum resisted Terra's coup, but when he noticed the indifference of the Uruguayan populace to the coup, he committed suicide on that very same day. His brother Alfeo was with him at the time he committed suicide, and from that moment on he was considered an opponent and an outlaw to Terra's regime. The Brum brothers were followers of the orthodox "Batllismo" faction within the Colorado Party (at the time, the followers of the ideals of President José Batlle y Ordoñez). He was imprisoned at Isla de las Ratas, and later was exiled.

He was once again elected a senator in the November 1946 elections, for the 1947–1951 period.

== Vice President of Uruguay ==
The death of President Tomás Berreta, and the succession to the presidency of Luis Batlle Berres, determined that Alfeo Brum, the first Senator of the Batllismo faction's Senate list, took over the Vice-Presidency for the rest of the period, until March 1951. In the November 1950 elections, he was the Vice-Presidential candidate of Andrés Martínez Trueba, one of the two presidential candidates of the Batllismo faction.

Martínez Trueba and the Colorado Party won the elections, and Alfeo Brum went on to serve as vice president from 1951 to 1952. As vice president, he also served as the President of the Senate of Uruguay.

== Post-vice presidency ==
In 1952 Brum stepped down from the vice presidency and the office of Vice President of Uruguay went into abeyance, to be revived again in 1967, within Brum's lifetime.

Alfeo Brum died in Montevideo on 25 February 1972.

== See also ==
- Politics of Uruguay
- List of political families#Uruguay

Political offices
Preceded by Luis Batlle Berres	Vice President of Uruguay; 1947–1952	Succeeded by Jorge Pacheco Areco
