= 1966 Uruguayan constitutional referendum =

A constitutional referendum was held in Uruguay on 27 November 1966 alongside general elections. Four proposals for amending the constitution were put to voters, with one option receiving 65% of the vote. As a result, the colegiado system was abolished in favour of returning to the presidential system.

== Proposals ==
Four proposals were put to voters, with each named after a colour.

=== Grey reforms ===
The grey reforms were put forward as a popular initiative on 28 April by the National Party alliance. They provided for a presidential system in which the President could be re-elected. The President could also dissolve the General Assembly and restrict personal freedoms. The proposals also called for the separation of election dates.

=== Pink reforms ===
The pink reforms were put forward as a popular initiative by the Colorado Party on 24 May with 500,000 signatures. It proposed reintroducing a presidential system, limiting presidents to a single term but allowing them to dissolve the General Assembly and preventing their impeachment. Although the party later switched its support to the yellow reforms, it could not withdraw the pink reform proposal from the referendum.

=== Yellow reforms ===
The yellow reforms were put forward as a popular initiative by the Left Liberation Front on 24 May. They proposed reintroducing a presidential system, banning the President from seeking immediate re-election, scrapping the lema system, nationalising large estates and setting pensions at a level equal to at least 85% of employees' final salary.

=== Orange reforms ===
The orange reforms were put forward by the General Assembly on 24 August as a counter-proposal to the popular initiatives. They proposed re-introducing a presidential system, banning the President or Vice-President from seeking immediate re-election, allowing the President to dissolve the General Assembly and extending the parliamentary term from four to five years.

== Results ==
Choice	Votes	%
Orange reforms	786,987	64.89
Grey reforms	175,095	14.21
Yellow reforms	86,315	7.00
Pink reforms	1,020	0.08
Against all	182,345	14.80
Total	1,231,762	100
Registered voters/turnout	1,656,322	74.28
Source: Direct Democracy
