= Eduardo Víctor Haedo =

Uruguayan political figure

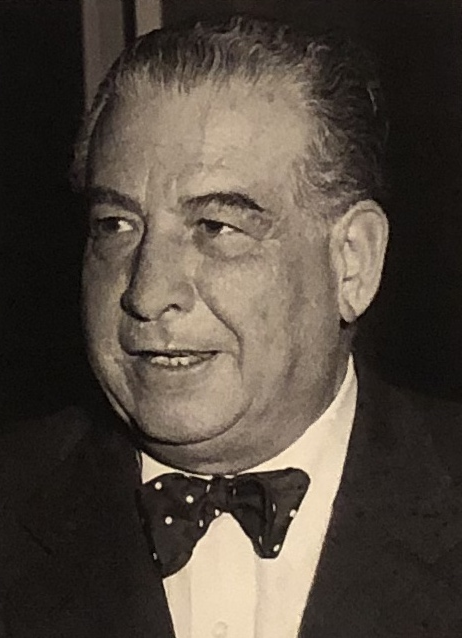

President of the National Council of Government of Uruguay
- In office 1 March 1961 – 1 March 1962
- Preceded by: Benito Nardone
- Succeeded by: Faustino Harrison

Minister of Public Instruction and Social Prevision
- In office 1936–1938
- President: Gabriel Terra
- Preceded by: Martín Echegoyen
- Succeeded by: Luis Mattiauda

Personal details
- Born: Eduardo Víctor Haedo Roubin; 28 July 1901 Mercedes, Uruguay
- Died: 15 November 1970 (aged 69) Punta del Este, Uruguay
- Party: National Party
- Occupation: Politician

Eduardo Víctor Haedo Roubin (28 July 1901 – 15 November 1970) was a Uruguayan political figure.

== Biography ==
Haedo was born in Mercedes. He was educated at the University of San Marcos in Lima, Peru, and taught literature and history after his return to Uruguay.

A member of the National Party, Haedo was elected to the Chamber of Representatives in 1931 and served until 1935. From 1936 to 1938, he was Minister of Public Instruction and Social Prevision under President Gabriel Terra. In this office he proposed legislation on authors' rights, known as the "Haedo Law", which was enacted in December 1937. Haedo also worked to add a faculty of humanities to the University of the Republic, and proposed the founding of a national theatre, which would lead to the creation of the Comedia Nacional in 1947.

Haedo was elected to the Senate in 1938, where would become a prominent member of the Blanco Democratic Union faction of the National Party. A longtime ally of Luis Alberto de Herrera, he was also associated with the party's Herrerist faction. In 1959 Haedo was elected to the ruling nine-member National Council of Government, and served as its president between 1961 and 1962. He remained on the National Council until March 1963, when he returned to his seat in the Senate. Haedo retired from politics in 1967.

Haedo was a notable supporter of pan-Americanism, and published numerous studies and essays on history and politics.

== Honours and awards ==
=== Foreign honours ===
- (Argentina) Collar of the Order of the Liberator General San Martín (1948)
- (Bolivia) Grand Collar of the Order of the Condor of the Andes (1948)
- (Brazil) Grand Collar of the Order of the Southern Cross (1948)
- (Chile) Collar of the Order of Merit (1948)
- (Paraguay) Grand Collar of the National Order of Merit (1948)
- Grand Cross of the Order of the Sun of Peru (1948)
- (Spain) Knight Grand Cross of the Order of Isabella the Catholic (14 May 1948)
- (Italy) Knight Grand Cross with Collar of the Order of Merit of the Italian Republic (6 April 1961)

Political offices
Preceded by Benito Nardone	President of the Uruguayan National Council of Government; 1961 – 1962	Succeeded by Faustino Harrison
