= Headquarters of the Bank of the Oriental Republic of Uruguay =

Banco de la República Oriental del Uruguay Building
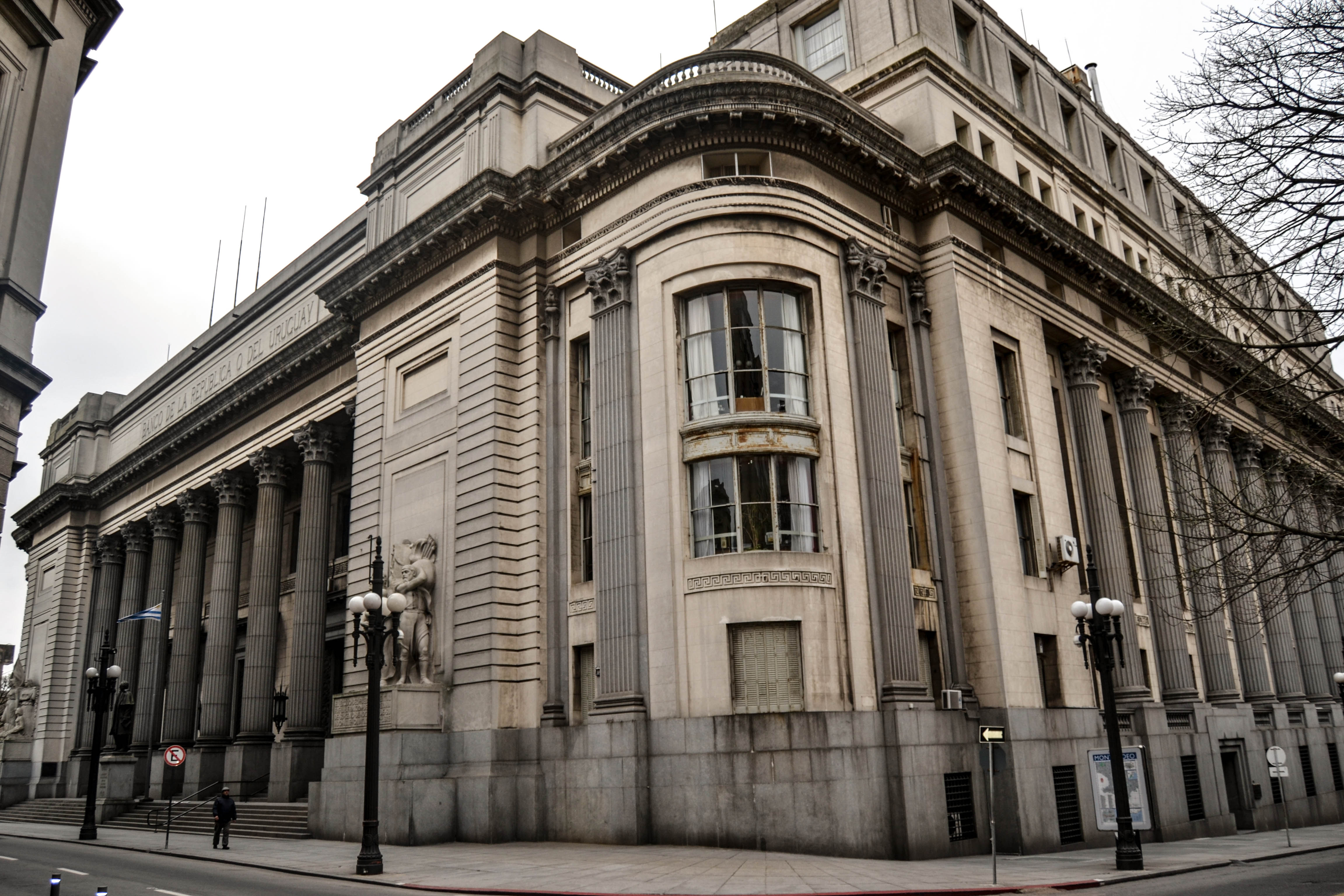
- Front entrance of the building
- Interactive map of the Banco de la República Oriental del Uruguay Building area

General information
- Architectural style: Neoclassicism
- Location: Ciudad Vieja, Montevideo, Uruguay
- Coordinates: 34°54′20″S 56°12′31″W
- Completed: 1938; 88 years ago

Design and construction
- Architect: Giovanni Veltroni

The Headquarters of the Bank of the Oriental Republic of Uruguay is the building that houses the main offices of the Banco de la República Oriental del Uruguay. It is located in Ciudad Vieja, Montevideo. The building, which was built in the neoclassical style, was designed by Italian architect Giovanni Veltroni and completed in 1938.

== History ==
The building is the work of Italian architect Giovanni Veltroni and was inaugurated on 19 February 1938, ten years after the approval for its construction. The sculptures of its facade are the work of Uruguayan sculptor Juan Zorrilla de San Martín and were inaugurated in 1940 and 1950. An expansion of the third floor and restructuring of the base floor were done in 1953.

The building is one of the notable architectural sights of the Ciudad Vieja and is a National Heritage Site since 1975.

== In popular culture ==
- The building is featured in the 2014 short film Protocolo Celeste, directed by Martín Sastre. Starring actress Natalia Oreiro and footballer Diego Forlán, who play two "celestes agents" who must recover Obdulio Varela's medal stolen from National Treasury, the short promotes Uruguay's bid to host the FIFA World Cup in 2030.
- In 2021, the building appeared in the promo that announced the premiere date of the second season of Got Talent Uruguay, featuring the panel of judges using the bank's facilities for a mission.
