= Daniel Fernández Crespo =

Uruguayan politician

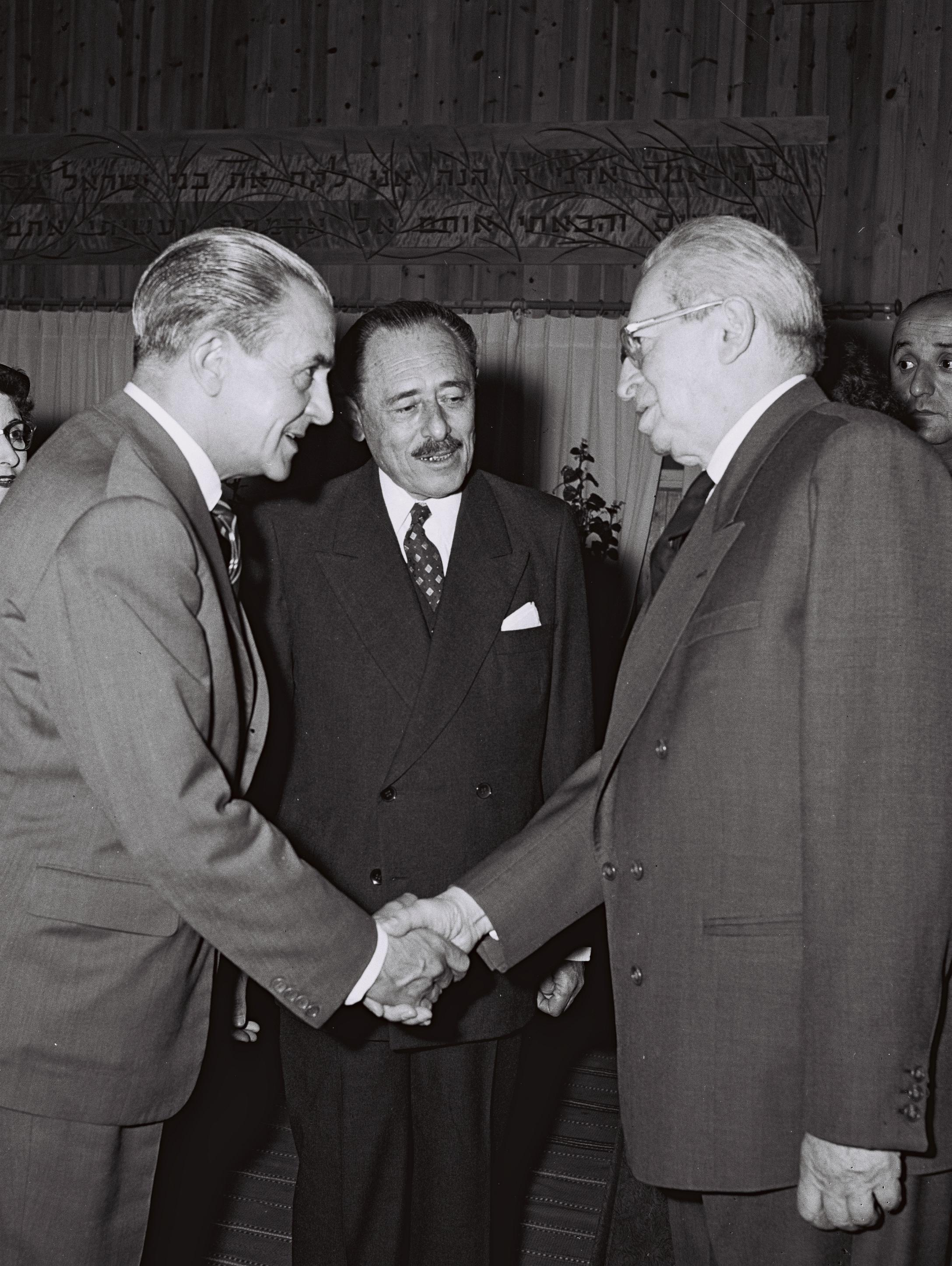
Daniel Fernández Crespo meeting President Yitzhak Ben-Zvi in Israel, 1959

Daniel Fernández Crespo(28 April 1901 – 28 July 1964) was a Uruguayan political figure.

== Background and early career ==
A political reformer, Fernández Crespo belonged to the National Party, and entered politics in the early 1930s. Formerly a schoolteacher, by the time he assumed Presidential office he had achieved a reputation as a prolific sponsor of reformist legislation, including unemployment insurance and labor exchanges in the meat processing industry, equal salary for women and men in the same job, guarantees for the employee or worker who contracts a marriage or is a mother, special retirement for workers working in unhealthy environments that produce premature occupational diseases, Agrarian Cooperatives, Agrarian Reform, and participation of workers in the profits of the companies.

Crespo also led a dissident National Party faction called the Nationalist Popular Movement whose management, according to one study, "was characterized by a certain populist intonation, as it showed preferential concern for labor problems and the situation of the passive classes." During the 1954 election, as noted by one study, the MPN promised to create social legislation “that would protect the worker and the middle class, stimulate employment and “reduce economic inequalities.” ” It also advocated a leading role for the state in overcoming the country’s economic crisis at that time, including a policy of public works and gradual national industrialization that increased employment and diversified production. In addition, it proposed to benefit the popular sectors “by replacing consumption taxes with income taxes and rewarding workers “through an appropriate percentage of the profits obtained by the company.” "

From 1954 till 1958 he served as minority member of the National Council of Government (Uruguay).

In 1963 his National Party colleague Faustino Harrison stepped down from the Presidency of the Council.

During the Sixties, Crespo was one of the leaders of a National Party faction known as the White Democratic Union. Ideologically, although this faction was (as noted by one study) “more progressive than the Blanco Party,” it was “slightly more to the right than the Colorado Party.”

== President of the National Council of Government ==
He became President of the National Council of Government (Uruguay) in 1963. While serving in this position, Crespo took steps to forbid the import of luxury goods (during the previous Administration, as noted by one obituary, "Uruguay had suffered from a steady decrease in population and exports that had resulted in an unfavorable commercial balance") while also backing a decree raising taxes on cars, motors and auto parts from 100% to 300%. These steps, however, did little to stem the decline of the peso and costs continued to rise in direct opposition to a continued decline of production that started in 1955.

In 1964 he was succeeded as president by another National Party colleague, Luis Giannattasio, who died in office.

== Death and legacy ==
Fernández Crespo died on 28 July 1964, a few months after leaving office.

Crespo also had a career in sports, presiding over the Liverpool and Aguada Clubs, and also served in the Uruguayan Football Association.

A road in the capital, Montevideo, is named after him.

Political offices
Preceded by Faustino Harrison	President of the Uruguayan National Council of Government; 1963–1964	Succeeded by Luis Giannattasio
