= Arturo Lezama =

Uruguayan politician (1899–1964)

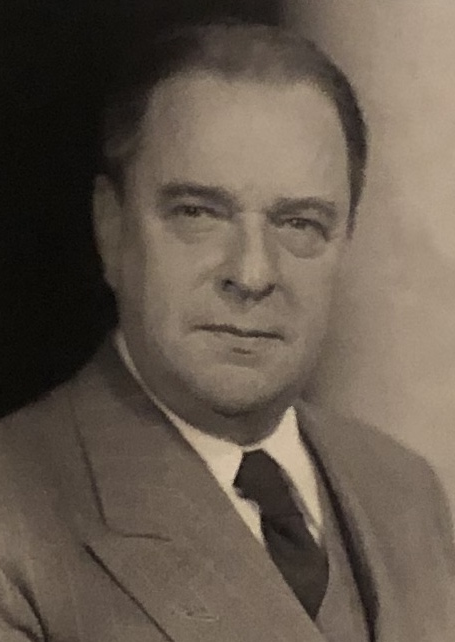
Image of Arturo Lezama

Arturo Lezama Bagez (1899–1964) was a Uruguayan political figure.

== Background ==
Lezama was a prominent member of the Uruguayan Colorado Party which ruled the country for lengthy periods, and was President of the Chamber of Deputies in 1951 and 1953. In 1957 his fellow-Colorado colleague President Alberto Fermín Zubiría stepped down from office.

== President of the National Council of Government ==
In 1955 Lezama was elected a member of the National Council of Government, which he presided 1957–1958. That year started the exploration in search for petroleum on Uruguayan territory.

He was succeeded by Carlos Fischer, a Colorado Party colleague.

== Death ==
Lezama died in 1964.

== See also ==
- Politics of Uruguay
- Colorado Party (Uruguay)

Political offices
Preceded by Alberto Fermín Zubiría	President of the Uruguayan National Council of Government; 1957–1958	Succeeded by Carlos Fischer
