= Carlos Fischer =

Uruguayan political figure

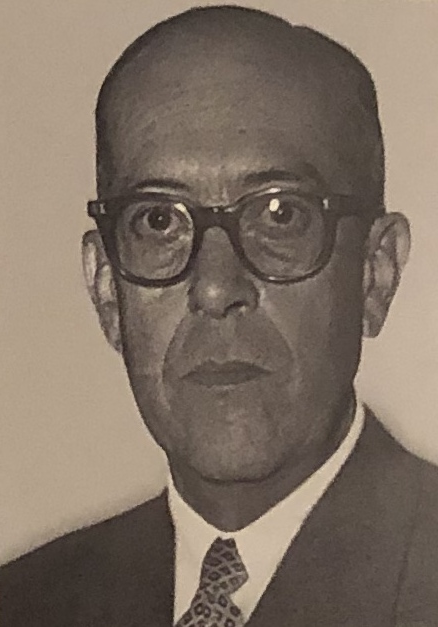

President of the National Council of Government of Uruguay
- In office 1 March 1958 – 1 March 1959
- Preceded by: Arturo Lezama
- Succeeded by: Martín Echegoyen

Minister of Livestock and Agriculture
- In office 1950–1951
- President: Luis Batlle Berres
- Preceded by: Luis Alberto Brause
- Succeeded by: Luis Alberto Brause

Personal details
- Born: Carlos Lorenzo Fischer Brusoni; 30 July 1903 Fray Bentos, Uruguay
- Died: 7 August 1969 (aged 66) Paris, France
- Political party: Colorado Party
- Occupation: Politician

Carlos Lorenzo Fischer Brusoni (30 July 1903 – 7 August 1969) was a Uruguayan political figure. He was President of the National Council of Government from 1958 to 1959.

== Background ==
Of German ancestry, Fischer was born in Fray Bentos. From 15 February 1943 until 9 November 1949 he was a member of the Chamber of Deputies for the Colorado Party, representing the Río Negro Department. Between 1950 and 1951 he served as Minister of Livestock and Agriculture.

In 1955 he was elected member of the National Council of Government; after fellow Colorado Party member Arturo Lezama stepped down as President of the body on 7 March 1958, Fischer acceded to that position. During his presidency, three social security laws were passed that established maternity leave with full pay during 6 weeks prior to and 6 weeks after childbirth for all working women, set up an unemployment insurance fund, and extended access to family allowances.

On 1 March 1959, he was succeeded by Martín Echegoyen of the National Party. Fischer then served as first Vice-President the Senate until 1963. During the 38th and 39th legislative period he was a replacing senator from 3 March 1959 until 14 February 1967, with some interruptions. Fischer died in Paris, France in 1969, while serving as Ambassador there.

== See also ==
- Politics of Uruguay
- Colorado Party (Uruguay)

Political offices
Preceded by Arturo Lezama	President of the Uruguayan National Council of Government; 1958–1959	Succeeded by Martín Echegoyen
