= Julio César Lupinacci Gabriel =

Uruguayan diplomat

Uruguayan Ambassador to Venezuela
- In office January 28, 1976 – July 6, 1976
- Preceded by: Luis Benvenuto
- Succeeded by: relations broken

Uruguayan Ambassador to Chile
- In office 1982–1985
- Preceded by: Dante Paladini Mainenti
- Succeeded by: Alfredo Bianchi Palazzo

Uruguayan Permanent Representative next the Headquarters of the United Nations
- In office 1985–1987
- Preceded by: Juan Carlos Blanco Estradé
- Succeeded by: Felipe Paolillo

Uruguayan Ambassador to Italy
- In office 1991–1993
- Preceded by: Gustavo Somma
- Succeeded by: 2008-2014:Alberto Breccia Guzzo; Gastón Alfonso Lasarte Burghi

Uruguayan Ambassador to Argentina
- In office Appointed: 18 May 1999, accredited: 7 July 1999 – 9 May 2000
- Preceded by: Juan Raúl Ferreira
- Succeeded by: Alberto Volonté

Uruguayan Ambassador to the Holy See
- In office 9 May 2000 – july of 2002
- Preceded by: Felipe Héctor Paolillo
- Succeeded by: Daniel Pérez del Castillo

Personal details
- Born: November 20, 1928 Montevideo
- Died: November 9, 2008 (aged 79)
- Spouse: Raquel Olaso
- Parent(s): Eugenia Gabriel and Atistedes Lupinacci
- Education: Law at University of Montevideo.

Julio César Lupinacci Gabriel was a Uruguayan diplomat.

== Life ==
- in 1953 he taught at the military and maritime school.
- In 1962 he joined the Foreign Service, was a legal adviser, director, secretary of state in the Ministry of Foreign Affairs and Professor for Public Law.
- From 1967 to 1969, he was involved in legal matters in the Uruguayan Mission to the Organization of American States in Washington, D.C.
- In 1976, he was an ambassador to Caracas (Venezuela).
- In Montevideo, the teacher Elena Quintero was arrested on June 26, 1976, and taken to torture center "300 Carlos".
- On the pretext of an appointment, Elena Quinteros succeeded in arriving at the wall of the Venezuelan Embassy in Montevideo in an exterritorial area, communicating her name to the embassy staff, and praying for asylum. Her guards tore her off the wall, visibly breaking her leg, and then she was disappeared.
- On the grounds of violating the sovereignty of the Venezuelan Embassy in Montevideo, the government in Caracas broke its diplomatic relations with the government in Montevideo on July 5, 1976.
- Lupinacci was the co-author of a memorandum on the behavior of the Uruguayan government regarding the disappearance of the teacher Elena Quinteros.
- From 1982 to 1985, he was an ambassador to Santiago de Chile next to Augusto Pinochet.
- From 1985 to 1987, he was Permanent Representative of the Government of Uruguay to the Headquarters of the United Nations in New York City.
- In 1985, he chaired the Uruguayan delegation to the third conference on the Convention on the Law of the Sea and was Secretary-General of the fifth session of the Foreign Ministers in Geneva on the Uruguay Round
- From 1991 to 1993, he was an ambassador in Rome and at the same time accredited to the government in Valletta(Malta).
- In 1993, he was ambassador to Italy and sent a photo of the by the Chilean justice searched Chilean chemist Eugenio Berríos, which laid a track to his alleged residence Milan. While Berríos was already dead in Uruguay for three months. He was found dead in Ururguay in 1995, after being guarded and abducted by Uruguayan soldiers, as the Chilean courts were able to establish.
- On 18 May 1999, he was appointed ambassador to Buenos Aires, where he was accredited from 7 July 1999 to 9 May 2000.
- From 2000 to July 2002, he was ambassador to the Holy See and the Food and Agriculture Organization of the United Nations.
- The Ambassador's family gave his library, books, folders and his desk to the University of Montevideo.
