= Alberto Fermín Zubiría =

Uruguayan political figure

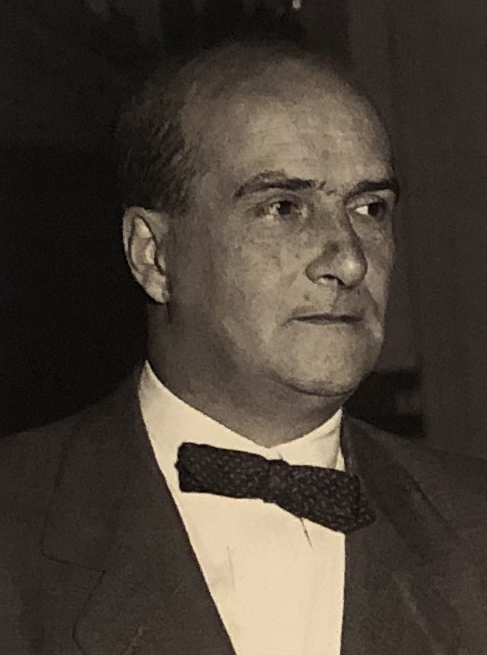
Alberto Fermín Zubiría

Alberto Fermín Zubiría Urtiague (9 October 1901 – 4 October 1971) was a Uruguayan political figure, who served as the third President of the National Council of Government of Uruguay, the nominal head of a state in a nine-member executive council where the position of chairman rotated among the members for one year terms. Fermín served the term lasting from 1 March 1956 to 1 March 1957.

== Background ==
Alberto Fermín Zubiría was a prominent member of the Uruguayan Colorado Party, which ruled the country for long periods. He became a Deputy in 1932. He was noted for his opposition to President Gabriel Terra.

In 1947 he was appointed Industry minister in the administration of President Tomás Berreta. From 1948 to 1950 he served as Interior Minister under President Luis Batlle Berres. He was the president of Banco de la República Oriental del Uruguay from 1950 to 1954.

== President of the National Council of Government ==
In 1956, following his fellow-Colorado colleague President Batlle Berres stepping down from his second term as president, he served as President of the National Council of Government of Uruguay until 1957.

He was succeeded as president by his Colorado party colleague Arturo Lezama.

== Post Presidency ==
While the opportunity was created for him to serve in a Senate post in 1966, in the event he declined to do so.

He died on 4 October 1971 a few days before his 70th birthday.

== See also ==
- es:Alberto Fermín Zubiría
- Politics of Uruguay

Political offices
Preceded by Luis Batlle Berres	President of the Uruguayan National Council of Government; 1956–1957	Succeeded by Arturo Lezama
