= Alberto Héber Usher =

Uruguayan politician

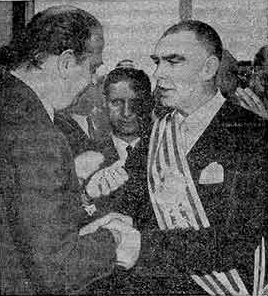

President of the Uruguayan National Council of Government
- In office March 1, 1966 – February 28, 1967
- Preceded by: Washington Beltrán Mullin
- Succeeded by: Óscar Diego Gestido

Personal details
- Born: May 1, 1916 Montevideo, Uruguay
- Died: January 19, 1981 (aged 62) Montevideo, Uruguay
- Party: Partido Nacional
- Occupation: Politician

Alberto Héber Usher (May 1, 1918 – January 19, 1981) was a Uruguayan politician, who served as President of the Uruguayan National Council of Government from March 1, 1966, to March 1, 1967.

== Background ==
Héber was born in Montevideo. His parents were Blanca Usher Conde and Alberto Héber Uriarte (grand-nephew of Juan D. Jackson). He was a member of the National Party, and was elected to the Chamber of Deputies in 1958.

His brother, Mario Héber (d.1980), was a prominent public representative and opposition leader during the civilian-military administration of 1973–1985. His nephew Luis Alberto Héber has been a prominent National Party Deputy and Senator.

== President of the National Council of Government ==
In 1958 Héber was elected a member of the National Council of Government, which he presided from 1966 to 1967. His period of office coincided with constitutional changes which envisaged lengthening the President's term of office to 5 years. In the event, however, his successor Óscar Diego Gestido served for only a few months.

== Death ==
He died in Montevideo in 1981.

== See also ==
- Politics of Uruguay
- List of political families#Uruguay

Political offices
Preceded by Washington Beltrán	President of the Uruguayan National Council of Government; 1966–1967	Succeeded by Óscar Diego Gestido
