= 1951 Uruguayan constitutional referendum =

A constitutional referendum was held in Uruguay on 16 December 1951. The proposed amendments to the constitution were approved by 54% of voters.

== Proposals ==
The proposed changes to the constitution were presented to the General Assembly on 30 June 1951. The Chamber of Deputies approved it by a vote of 85 to 14 on 10 October, whilst the Senate approved it by a vote of 26 to 4 on 26 October.

The amendments would:

- reintroduce the colegiado system of government, giving six seats on the National Council of Government to the largest party and three to the second largest party.
- provide for a bicameral General Assembly elected by proportional representation.
- retain the use of the lema system.
- allow petitions for constitutional amendments signed by 10% of registered voters, and allow the General Assembly to put forward a counter-proposal to the proposed amendments.

== Results ==
Choice	Votes	%
For	232,076	54.00
Against	197,684	46.00
Total	429,760	100
Registered voters/turnout	1,158,939	37.08
Source: Direct Democracy

== Aftermath ==
The colegiado system was reintroduced prior to the 1954 general elections.
