= Banco de la República Oriental del Uruguay =

State-owned bank located in Uruguay

Bank of the Oriental Republic of Uruguay
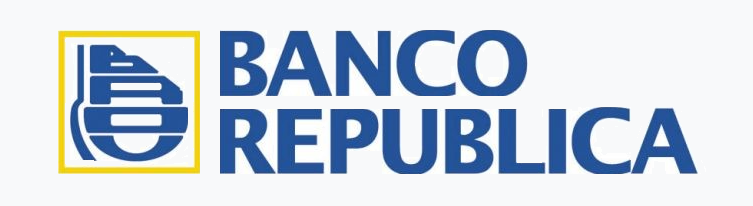

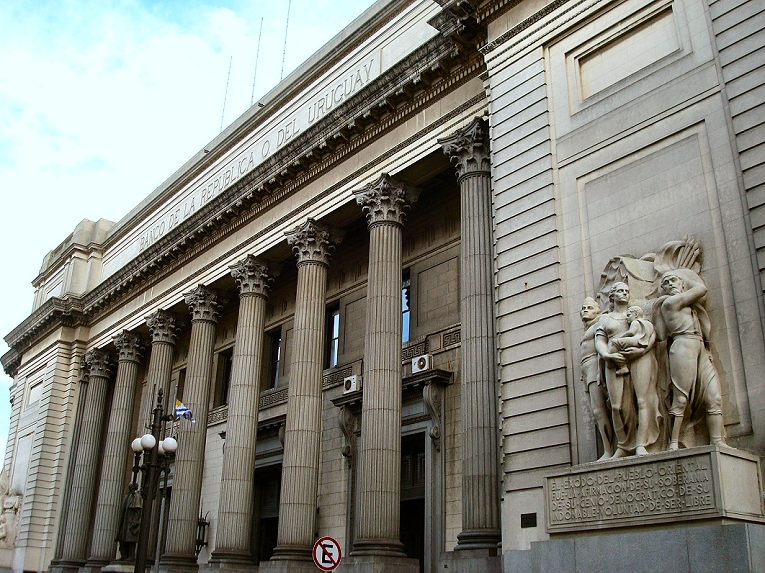
- Headquarters of Banco República
- Native name: Banco de la República Oriental del Uruguay
- Company type: State-owned
- Industry: Banking; Financial services
- Founded: August 24, 1896; 129 years ago
- Headquarters: Montevideo, Uruguay
- Area served: Uruguay
- Key people: Álvaro García (President); Adriana Rodríguez (Vice President)
- Website: brou.com.uy

Banco de la República Oriental del Uruguay (Spanish for 'Bank of the Oriental Republic of Uruguay') (also known as Banco República or BROU) is a state-owned commercial bank in Uruguay, founded in 1896 under the presidency of Juan Idiarte Borda.

The most important Uruguayan bank with the largest number of customers, it plays a dominant role in lending and deposit in the Uruguayan market. It currently has 124 branches throughout the national territory and 2 abroad.

== History ==
In the last decades of the 19th century, different social groups such as small merchants and public employees, who, in the framework of the Baring Crisis, demanded access to bank credit, so as not to resort to usury private banks and various lenders. In the Agricultural Livestock Congress of 1895, the creation of a financial institution had been called for to provide agricultural credit, and to adapt the terms and conditions required for rural production. The creation of the Bank was proposed by then Minister of Finance Federico Vidiella, was widely discussed in Parliament and in the local press, and on August 4, 1896, the law containing the thirty-four bases of the Organic Charter was promulgated. On August 24, 1896, the bank's first board of directors was installed, and on October 22 it formally opened its doors, with 54 employees. The first deposit account was made by President Juan Idiarte Borda.

The Organic Charter granted the bank the power to issue banknotes —from 1907 it had a monopoly on it—. Over time, it developed a wide variety of activities, such as a commercial and specialized credit bank, a state bank and, gradually, the Uruguayan monetary authority.

After the 1929 crisis, the Banco de la República became the key piece of economic policy. In the 1930s, the bank was restructured and divided into a Banking Department and a Currency Management and Money Supply Department. In 1941, the Board of Directors resolved to create the Department of Economic Research, thus perfecting the Bank's advisory role to government bodies.

Due to the banking crisis that took place in the 1960s, the department in charge of currency management and money supply was separated from the institution and turned into a new entity, the Central Bank of Uruguay, created with the Constitution of 1967.

== Headquarters ==
The bank's headquarters are located in Ciudad Vieja, Montevideo. The building, designed by the Italian architect Giovanni Veltroni in a neoclassical style, was built in 1866 to house the Italian Bank, and was later used successively by other banking institutions, such as Banco Unión, or by the Junta de Crédito Público and by Banco Nacional until its dissolution.

== Branches ==
As of February 2023 the bank maintained 124 branches throughout Uruguay and 2 overseas (Buenos Aires and New York City).

Selected branches of the Bank of the Oriental Republic of Uruguay

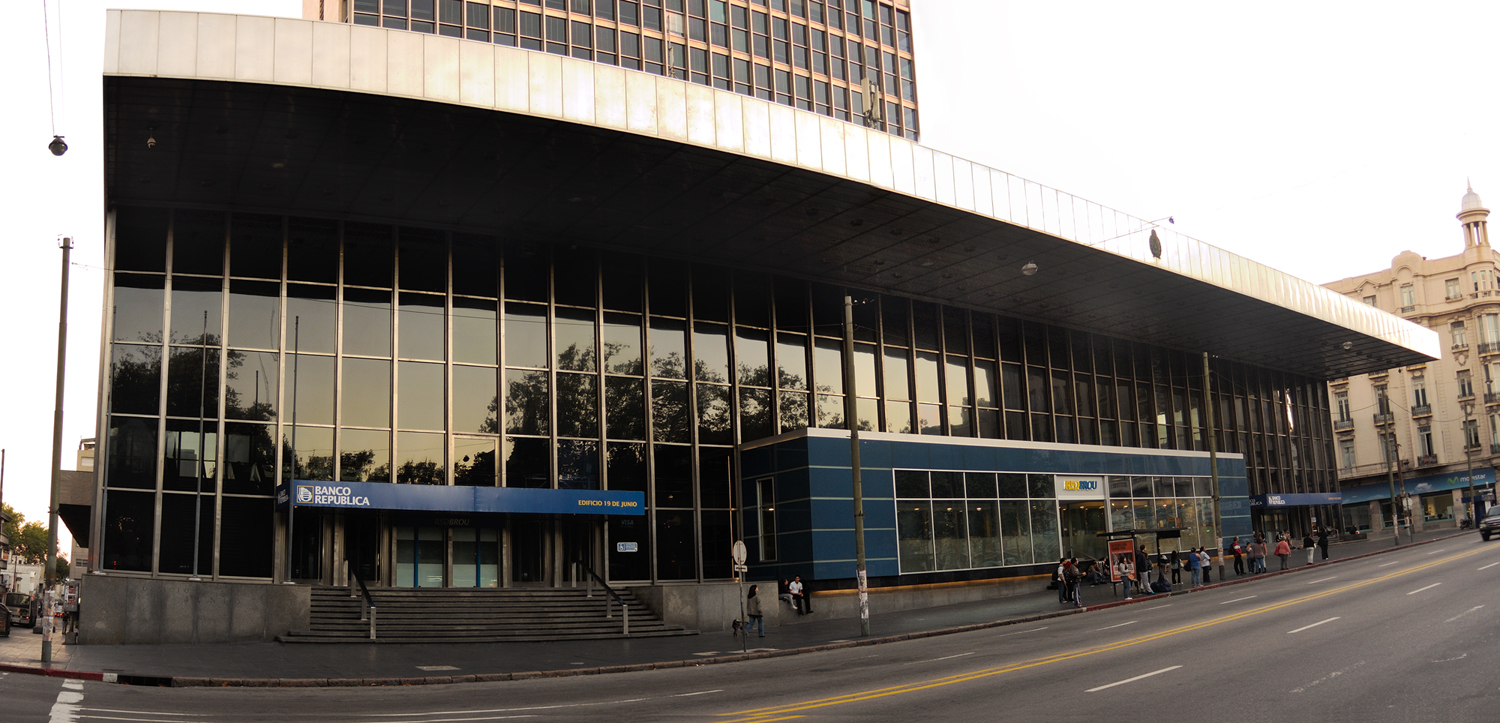
Cordón, Montevideo

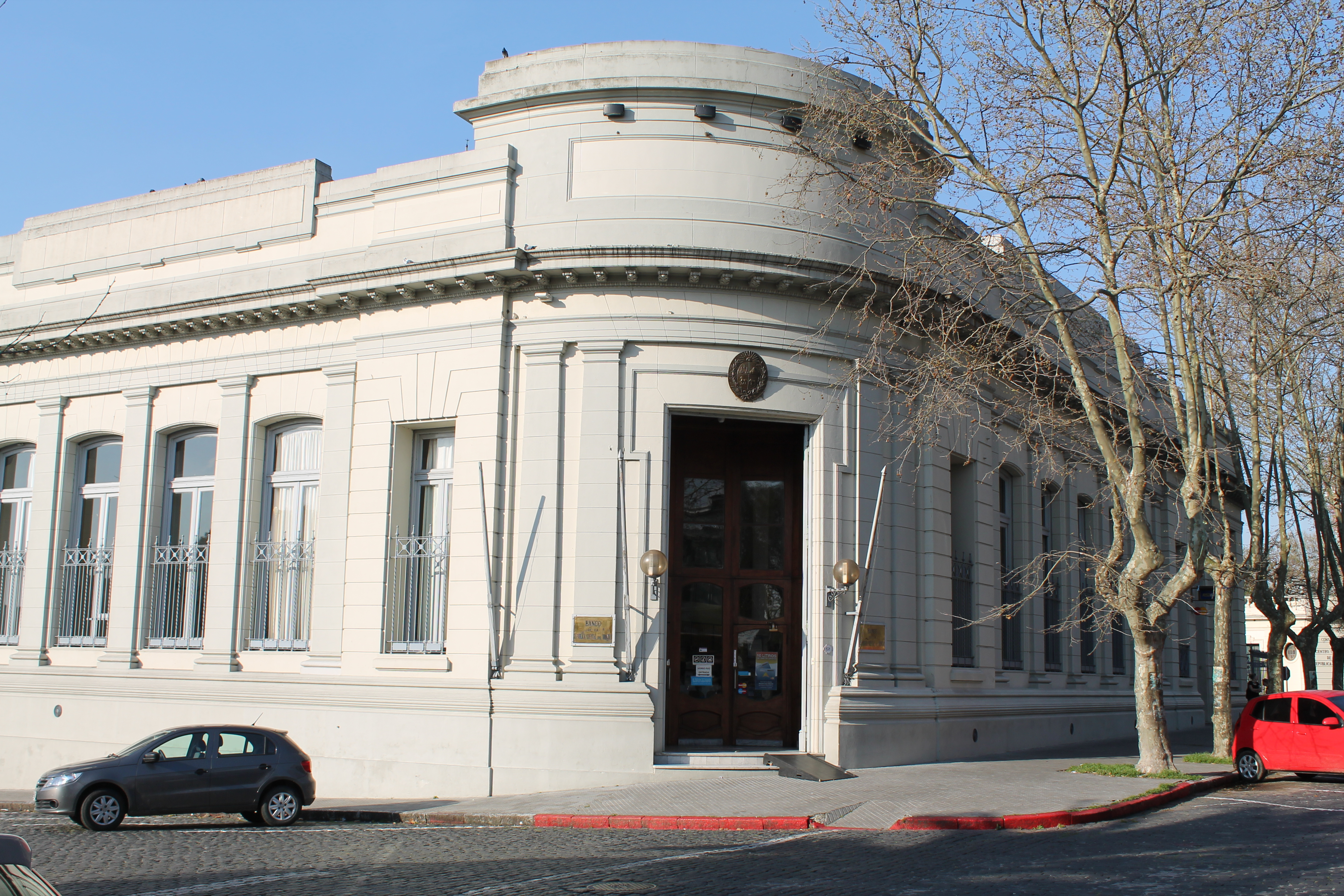
Colonia del Sacramento, Colonia

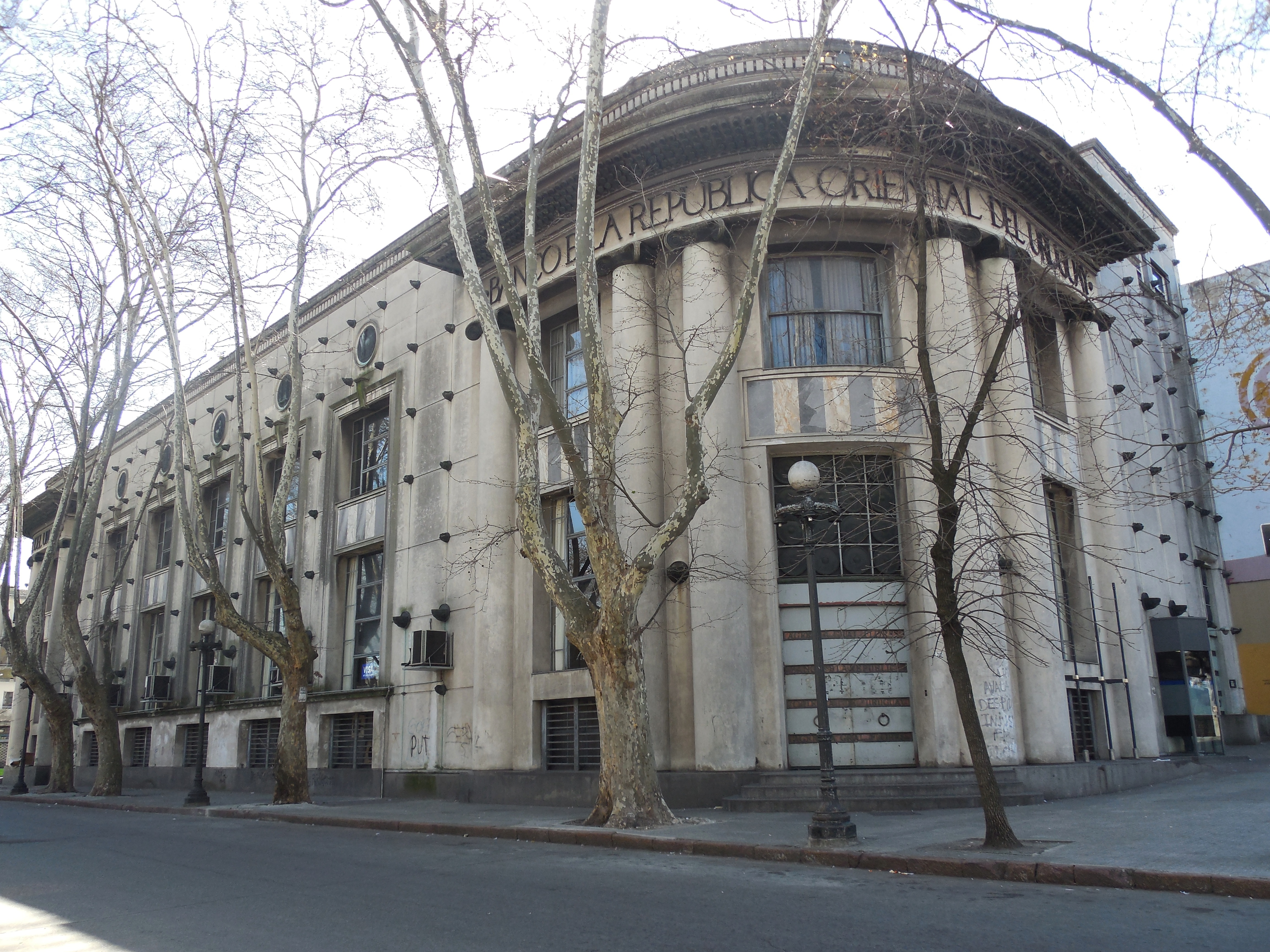
Goes, Montevideo

== Presidents of the Bank ==
List of the presidents of Banco de la República Oriental del Uruguay before the creation of Banco Central del Uruguay.

Name	Period	Notes
Claudio Williman	01/05/1916 – 30/04/1928	
Pedro Aramendía	01/05/1928 – 30/11/1928	
Alejandro Gallinal	01/02/1929 – 30/11/1931	
Javier Mendivil	01/12/1931 – 30/03/1933	
José Serrato	01/04/1933 – 30/07/1934	
Jorge West	01/08/1934 – 30/07/1938	
Gabriel Terra	01/08/1938 – 30/06/1939	
Vicente Costa	01/08/1939 – 31/05/1943	
Alfredo Baldomir	01/06/1943 – 30/06/1946	
Andrés Martínez Trueba	01/02/1948 – 30/06/1950	
Alberto Fermín Zubiría	01/07/1950 – 30/11/1954	
Francisco Forteza	01/06/1955 – 31/07/1958	
Mario Fullgraff	01/08/1958 – 30/06/1959	
Solano Amilivia	01/07/1959 – 30/04/1963	
Francisco Podesta	01/05/1963 – 30/06/1964	
José Pedro Aramendía	01/08/1964 – 30/04/1965	
Julio Solsona Flores	01/05/1965 – 31/01/1967	
Daniel H. Martins	03/03/1967 – 16/05/1967	
Enrique V. Iglesias	16/05/1967 – 09/01/1969	
