= 1996 Uruguayan constitutional referendum =

8 December 1996

Results
Choice	Votes	%
Yes	1,015,828	52.20%
No	930,288	47.80%
Valid votes	1,946,116	96.66%
Invalid or blank votes	67,335	3.34%
Total votes	2,013,451	100.00%
Registered voters/turnout	2,343,920	85.9%

A constitutional referendum was held in Uruguay on 8 December 1996. The proposals, which included limiting each party to a single presidential candidate, were narrowly approved by voters.

== Proposals ==
The proposals were approved by both houses of the General Assembly on 15 October 1996. They included:

- separating national and local elections
- limiting each party to one presidential candidate (abolishing sublemas)
- introducing a second round run-off for presidential elections
- providing for primary elections in parties
- decentralising local government
- environmental protection

== Results ==
Choice	Votes	%
For	1,015,828	52.20
Against	930,288	47.80
Total	1,946,116	100.00
Valid votes	1,946,116	96.66
Invalid/blank votes	67,335	3.34
Total votes	2,013,451	100.00
Registered voters/turnout	2,343,920	85.90
Source: Direct Democracy
