= November 1989 Uruguayan constitutional referendum =

26 November 1989

Results
Choice	Votes	%
Yes	1,681,592	81.78%
No	374,763	18.22%
Valid votes	2,056,355	100.00%
Invalid or blank votes	0	0.00%
Total votes	2,056,355	100.00%
Registered voters/turnout	2,319,022	88.67%

A constitutional referendum was held in Uruguay on 26 November 1989 alongside general elections. The proposed changes to the constitution would require state pensions to be increased at the same rate as the salary of civil servants. The proposal was approved by 81.78% of those voting and 72.51% of all registered voters.

== Background ==
Uruguay was suffering from a high inflation rate of around 100% at the time of the referendum. It was held after a petition was submitted by pensioner organisations with the required signatures of 10% of the number of registered voters. In order to pass, the referendum had to be approved by a 50% of those voting and 35% of registered voters. Invalid or blank votes were taken to be "no" votes.

== Constitutional amendments ==
The proposals would amend article 67 of the constitution to state:

The general retirement and social security funds shall be organized in such a way as to guarantee to all workers, employers, employees, and laborers adequate retirement pensions and subsidies in case of accident, sickness, disability, enforced unemployment, etc.; and in case of death, the corresponding pension to their families. The old age pension is the right of those who have reached the limit of their productive age, after long residence in the country, and who lack the means to provide for the necessities of life.
The adjustments to Retirement and Pension assignments cannot be inferior to the variation of the Median Index of Salaries, and will be effected in the same circumstances [oportunidades] as adjustments and augmentations in the remuneration of the functionaries of the Central Administration are established.
The benefits specified in the previous paragraph are financed on the basis of:
A) Worker and employer contributions and other taxes established by law; and
B) The financial assistance that must be proportional to the State, if deemed necessary.

== Results ==
Choice	Votes	%
For	1,681,592	81.78
Against	374,763	18.22
Total	2,056,355	100.00
Total votes	2,056,355	–
Registered voters/turnout	2,319,022	88.67
Source: Direct Democracy

== Aftermath ==
The effect of the amendment was a rapid rise in pension expenditure, which increased government spending by around 2–3% of GDP.
