= Washington Beltrán =

Uruguayan political figure

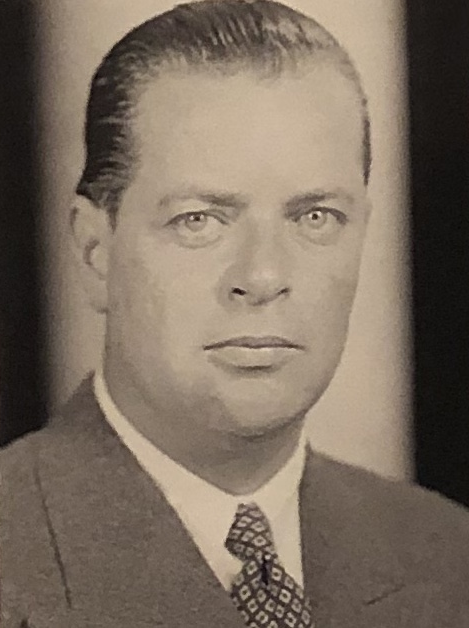
Image of Washington Beltrán Mullín

Jorge Washington Beltrán Mullin, better known as Washington Beltrán (6 April 1914 in Montevideo – 19 February 2003) was a Uruguayan politician and journalist.

== Biography ==
Beltrán was the son of Washington Beltrán Barbat, a deputy of the National Party who was killed in 1920 in a duel with former Colorado President José Batlle y Ordóñez. In 1939 Beltrán started working as a journalist for the newspaper El País, which had been co-founded by his father; in 1961 he joined the editorial board of the newspaper.

In 1943 Beltrán was elected to the Chamber of Representatives for the Independent National Party, and served until 1955. He was a co-founder of the Blanco Democratic Union, a faction of the National Party, in 1958, and was a member of the Senate from 1959.

Beltrán was elected to the nine-member National Council of Government in 1962. Following the death of Luis Giannattasio, he served as President of the Council between 1965 and 1966. Beltrán returned to the Senate in 1967. From 1973 until 1980, he was banned from political activities by the country's military government, and subsequently worked as a journalist.

In 1987 Beltrán was appointed Ambassador to the Holy See by President Julio María Sanguinetti, and as such accompanied Pope John Paul II during his visit to Uruguay in 1987.

Despite the rivalry between the National and Colorado parties, Beltrán publicly supported Colorado candidate Jorge Batlle against Socialist candidate Tabaré Vázquez in the second round of the 1999 presidential election.

Beltrán died in Montevideo on 19 February 2003. He is buried at the Central Cemetery of Montevideo.

== Honours and awards ==
=== Foreign honours ===
- Italy: Knight Grand Cross with Collar of the Order of Merit of the Italian Republic (8 September 1965)
- Peru: Grand Cross of the Order of the Sun of Peru (25 October 1966)

== See also ==
- Politics of Uruguay
- List of political families in Uruguay

Political offices
Preceded by Luis Giannattasio	President of the Uruguayan National Council of Government; 1965–1966	Succeeded by Alberto Héber Usher
