= Luis Batlle Berres =

President of Uruguay (1897–1964)

Luis Batlle
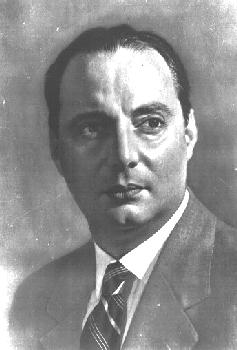
- Luis Batlle Berres

President of the National Council of Government of Uruguay
- In office 1 March 1955 – 1 March 1956
- Preceded by: Andrés Martínez Trueba
- Succeeded by: Alberto Fermín Zubiría

30th President of Uruguay
- In office 2 August 1947 – 1 March 1951
- Vice President: Alfeo Brum
- Preceded by: Tomás Berreta
- Succeeded by: Andrés Martínez Trueba

4th Vice President of Uruguay
- In office 1 March 1947 – 2 August 1947
- President: Tomás Berreta
- Preceded by: Alberto Guani
- Succeeded by: Alfeo Brum

President of the Chamber of Deputies
- In office 1943–1945
- Preceded by: Euclides Sosa Aguiar
- Succeeded by: Juan Francisco Guichón

Personal details
- Born: 26 November 1897 Montevideo, Uruguay
- Died: 15 July 1964 (aged 66) Montevideo, Uruguay
- Party: Colorado Party
- Spouse: Matilde Ibáñez Tálice
- Relations: Batlle family
- Children: Jorge Luis; Luis César; Matilde Linda
- Education: University of the Republic
- Occupation: Journalist; Politician
- Profession: Lawyer

Luis Conrado Batlle y Berres (26 November 1897 – 15 July 1964) was a Uruguayan politician who was President of Uruguay from 1947 to 1951.

== Background ==
Batlle Berres was a journalist and prominent member of the Uruguayan Colorado Party. He was selected – in hindsight, with far-reaching effect – to serve as vice presidential running-mate for Luis Tomás Berreta.

The great-great-grandson of Catalan settlers from Sitges, Spain, he was the son of another political figure, Luis Batlle y Ordóñez, brother of ex president José Batlle. His mother, Petrona Berres Mac Entyre, was of Irish descent and died when he was still a small child. Then, his father remarried but died soon after, in 1908. As a result, he went to live with his uncle, José Batlle y Ordóñez, the three-time President of Uruguay, and his cousins César, Rafael and Lorenzo Batlle Pacheco on the Piedras Blancas estate in the suburbs of Montevideo. He studied law at the urging of his godfather, Dr. José Irureta Goyena, and also Military Aviation. In 1933, he was expelled from Uruguay by the Terra dictatorship, and participated in the revolutionary preparations of 1934 and 1935, entering the country clandestinely. In 1936 Batlle Berres returned legally and bought Radio "Ariel". He also became Editor-in-Chief of El Día.

In 1927, he married Matilde Ibáñez Tálice, with whom he had three children: the also ex president Jorge Batlle, concert pianist Luis Batlle and daughter Matilde Linda Batlle.

Batlle Berres was first elected to the Chamber of Representatives in 1925 as a member of Jose Batlle's personal list and was reelected in 1928, with the list this time headed by Jose Batlle himself. In 1931, Batlle Berres was again reelected, this time within the dual lists "14" and "15", but following the Terra coup of 1933 he didn't seek office until 1942. He was also the leader of List 15, a left-leaning faction which was the majority faction of the Colorado Party from 1946 to about 1960. It placed second in the 1966 elections, but regained its majority position by 1970. Jorge Batlle, the son of Luis Batlle Berres, led the faction after his father died in 1964. According to one study, Batlle Berres was a strong-willed executive "who incurred wide criticism for employing his exalted office to advance his own interests." In 1950, he split the Colorado Party by deciding to offer his own ticket under a separate election list. This led to the emergence of his own List 15 faction, and the List 14 faction, led by the Batlle Pacheco brothers. In 1948, he founded in Montevideo the newspaper Acción, which he made the mouthpiece of his political faction. Commenting on his decision to set up his own newspaper, Batlle Berres humorously told a newsman that "I’ll have a paper in which to say good things about my government and bad things about some other people."

Batlle Berres faced criticism, launched by some sectors of his party, for proclaiming himself the heir of Batllismo. As noted by one biography, "The opposition was led by César and Lorenzo Batlle Pacheco, sons of José Batlle, who believed that they were the true heirs of Batllismo, although in practice they were much more conservative than their cousin and president." Commenting on the differences between Batlle Berres and César and Lorenzo Batlle Pacheco, one study argued that

Luis Batlle directed his appeal to the lower classes and to the labor unions. In the second and third decades of the century, Jose Batlle had done the same, but his sons and El Dia had settled down to the enjoyment of a position based on a sated bureaucracy, an accomplished social revolution, and an urban middle class whose contentment grew from its preferred position. Luis Batlle appeared to some as a demagogue quite as dangerous as Luis Herrera, but to the lower classes he seemed for the moment to promise the improvement in living level which the Batllista ideology had led them to believe they could expect. Many voters in the unthinking middle groups perceived Luis Batlle as a reasonable alternative to Jose Battle's sons, however, and he was careful to cultivate this confusion of thought. He ran in most elections in the Batllista slates of candidates, but intra-party developments reflected his increasing power.

== Vice President of Uruguay ==
He served as Vice President of Uruguay in 1947, succeeding Alberto Guani and held this office upon the death of President Berreta.

Batlle Berres was the fourth person to hold the office of Vice President of Uruguay. The office dates from 1934, when Alfredo Navarro became Uruguay's first Vice President. He previously served as the President of the Chamber of Deputies of Uruguay from 1943 to 1945.

== President of Uruguay (1st period of office) ==
He was President of Uruguay from 1947 to 1951, being succeeded in the office by Andrés Martínez Trueba. In this first period of Presidential office, the Vice President of Uruguay was Alfeo Brum.

According to one article at the time, presidential responsibilities came easily to Batlle Berres due to his background:

To stocky, solemn Luis Batlle, 50, presidential responsibilities came easily. He was the favorite nephew of his late great uncle, President José Batlle y Ordoñes, whose social laws gave Uruguay its name for progressive democracy. He has been in politics since he was 25. But politics has not been his only activity. He has had a radio station, Radio Ariel, over which many an Argentine and Paraguayan exile has broadcast. Every afternoon Luisito goes to the Café Montevideo on Avenida 18 Julio to gossip over coffee. He drives his car at high speed, likes to box. After hours, he takes his ease with his wife and three children at a small farm outside the capital.

Various reforms were introduced during the Batlle Berres presidency. Law 10937 of September 1947 extended "in favor of the machinists, stokers and drivers of cars-motors of the Administration of the Railways and Tramways of the Condition; machinists and stokers of the Directorates of Hydrography, Sanitation and Roads of the Ministry of Public Works and machinists, stokers, high voltage panel personnel and boiler repair personnel of the State Electric Power Plants, the benefits that Law number 9,700, of dated September 17, 1937, agrees to the machinists and stokers who provide services in private companies." Law 10,997 of December 1947 amended a previous social law (Law 10,436 of July 1943) in various ways, with certain amounts allocated for purposes related to maternity, child welfare and nutrition. Under Law 10960 the Bank of the Republic "is empowered to grant the dependent workers of the National Cooperative of Milk Producers, bank loans on their salaries and wages, in accordance with the provisions established in the law of November 21, 1941, extended by that of May 24, 1946."

Law 10949 of October 1947 authorized the Banco de la República "to extend the benefits of the operations "Loans on salaries", to the members of the Caja de Retirements of "Journalists and Graphics", which appear in the personnel of the houses where they provide services, as receiving their salaries on a daily basis. However, the other requirements imposed by the National Savings and Discount Fund for this type of operations must be fulfilled." Under Law 10999 of December 1947, a law on retirement benefits, "The benefit agreed by article 3 of Law number 10,014 is extended to the teaching staff of Physical Education throughout the country." Under a law promulgated on December the 4th 1947, a housing finance section was established in the Mortgage Bank of Uruguay. Authorized to act independently of the other economic and financial divisions of the Bank, the new section was intended "to aid in the solution of Uruguay's critical housing problem by loaning money for the acquisition, construction, and improvement of living quarters." This new section also had the right to acquire land "by mutual agreement or by expropriation, to subdivide it, and to build dwellings for sale or for rent."

A land reform law of 1948 sought to increase and improve agricultural production and improve the living conditions of rural workers. Under the law, a National Colonization Institute was set up, "to function as an autonomous body with full authority and adequate resources for buying, renting, or expropriating land, and organizing colonies of either Uruguayans or immigrants, or both." Preference under the law was to be given to evicted farmers, those with special skills, sons of colonists, and those organized in syndicates and cooperatives. It was also expected that consumers' and buyers' cooperatives would be organized in each colony, and that the State would provide "land, credit, and technical assistance, and assume the responsibility of building roads, schools, hospitals, and community centers, as well as industrial plants for processing agricultural products." Ley 11052 of 1948 provided for an increase "in the sum of two hundred seventy thousand pesos ($270,000.00) the "Public Works Debt 5% 1940" created by law number 9,953, of 4 September 1940, allocating said amount for the completion of the construction works of the San José Hospital." A new rental regime was provided by Ley 11229 of 1948, while another law introduced in 1948 contained various provisions in regards to the sale and production of milk. That same year, a Psychopath Trust was set up with the aim of providing a solution to the family situation of mentally ill patients.

Law 11024 authorized the Executive Power "to take from "Exchange Differences", the amount equivalent to one million dollars (U$S 1:000.00.00) as contribution of the Republic to the International Relief Fund for Childhood, created by resolution of the General Assembly of the Organization United Nations, 11 December 1946." In 1948, pensions were introduced for the Jockey Club (part-time) and health benefits established for 2 new groups (Congress and state bank). In 1949 the budget for school canteens and milk was increased, while new classes for children with hearing and sight defects were brought within the framework of special education. In regards to housing, a 1949 law was approved "granting special facilities to employees of the BHU." A Decree concerning Measures for the Prevention of Accidents to Workers Engaged in the Unloading of Coal and Salt dated 28 July 1949 "provides for the use of hooks with safety catches for all lifting equipment used in the unloading of coal and salt and for the blocking of trucks while salt is being unloaded. It also requires workers to use safety belts when they are at the top of hoppers." Law 11388 of 1949 provided for a subsidy to paid to the National Work for the Protection and Education of Mentally Abnormal Minors (Obra Morquio), which was intended to provide "medical-pedagogical assistance to at least 180 mentally abnormal children, regardless of any philosophical, political or religious proselytism." A law of December the 5th 1949 authorized compensation for farmers damaged by hail. Under Law 11,563 of 1950 "Facilities for the acquisition, construction, expansion and tax relief of housing are given to certain officials of the National Postal Savings Fund, the General Post Office and the Legislative Branch, with rules for carrying out operations."

An Act of April the 18th 1950 set up some free high-school courses in certain towns in the country’s interior, while an Act of May the 26th 1950 granted, for cultural purposes, a subsidy to the Young Farmers' League. An Act of September the 13th 1950 increased the salaries of civil servants, In July 1950 the Uruguayan Congress appropriated 50,000 pesos to support the Farm Youth Movement (a Uruguayan equivalent of the 4-H Clubs) which "operates through the rural schools on a volunteer basis." Two Acts dated September the 19th 1950 increased the contributions made to, together with the benefits to be paid out from, pension funds for workers. An Act of October the 9th 1950 introduced liberal workmen's compensation provisions in relation to occupational accidents. A previous system set up a "fixed maximum" which the present Act abandoned. In addition, law No. 11,617 of October the 20th 1950 created a new pension fund known as the Retirement and Pension Fund for Rural Workers, Domestic Workers and Old Age Pensions.

Starting in 1950, family allowance coverage was expanded through the extension of the age limit and the empowerment of minors in the care of older people with other occupational conditions. That same year, family allowances were extended to civil servants and the military, while a 1950 law provided that minimum payments to a family could not be less than seven pesos. Law No. 11,618 of 20 October 1950 included various improvements in the family allowances system. For instance, the right to the allowance was established for every dependent child of a worker and employed up to 14 years of age, while the benefit was extended up to 16 years of age in various cases. In addition, the benefit was extended "to crippled or disabled children until the age of 18, totally or partially for study or definitely for work." The limit to receive the allowance was also raised from $200.00 to $300.00. According to one study, "This amount represented the couple's total income, so that if the woman received other remuneration for work, retirement or pension, had to be added to the husband's remuneration." In addition, "It was authorized, with the surpluses after having served the corresponding allowances, to improve the services and grant extraordinary assistance (birth bonuses or death allowances)."

Law 11,577 October the 14th 1950 included a number of rights for working people. For instance, a 6-hour day was introduced "for workers engaged in activities that are officially considered unhealthful because of working conditions or materials that are handled." A Health Card instituted by law number 9,697 of 16 September 1937 was made mandatory for all employees and workers of unhealthy activities, while said employees and workers had to undergo medical check-ups every six months, while the corresponding information had to be recorded in their Health Cards. The law also provided that special work schedules for activities considered unhealthy by application of this law "shall earn the same salary as that determined for a full day's work in the same activities, by the awards or agreements in force. This equivalence of salary between the special schedules and the maximum legal working day shall be maintained as long as the qualification of unhealthy for the activity in question subsists. This equivalence also applies to pieceworkers. The minimum daily working day of the workers and employees covered by this law shall not be less than three hours and their remuneration shall reach 65% of the daily wage." Also, in case of diseases contracted as a consequence of or on the occasion of work, such as syphilis of glass blowers and tuberculosis of those who inhale dough dust or work in cold storage rooms, as laid out in the text of the law,

the State Insurance Bank shall consider them as occupational diseases, and shall pay the equivalent of the full wage for the entire duration of the disease. The worker's card will be considered as the main proof for these purposes. The income in case of permanent incapacity will be equal to the reduction that the incapacity has caused the salary or wage to suffer. If the incapacity is total, the income shall be equal to the equivalent of the salary or wage earned. The concept of total and permanent disability shall be established in direct function of the trade or work performed by the beneficiary, without taking into account his possibilities of readaptation to perform other jobs, as long as the State does not establish professional re-education schools and regulate the rights and obligations of the graduates."

The law also provided for the establishment of an Honorary Commission on Unhealthy Work, "providing for medical control, special hours, occupational diseases, night work, absence due to pregnancy." In addition, workers who had abandoned work due to illness contracted as a consequence or on occasion of the same

shall be reinstated once their recovery has been verified, enjoying the same situation that would have corresponded to them if the suspension of the work contract had not occurred and provided that their absence has not exceeded 18 months. The reinstated worker may not be dismissed until at least 180 days have elapsed from the date of his reinstatement, unless the employer can justify a serious surviving cause. The employer who violates the provisions of this article shall pay the employee an indemnity equivalent to three months' salary for each year or fraction thereof that he has worked in his service, plus the costs and expenses of the trial, if any."

The same law granted women extensive rights during pregnancy and in the puerperium. Under this law, every pregnant woman had the right to be absent from work for the time required by medical prescription, and if the absence from work lasts less than four months, the female worker was entitled to the full salary for their absence. If it exceeded that period, the female worker would earn half salary up to the term of six months, and the employment would be retained if she returned in normal conditions. In the case provided for in the preceding article, the worker would not be dismissed, and if that were to happen, the employer had to pay "an amount equivalent to six months' salary plus the corresponding legal indemnity." Also, in unhealthy activities, night work for those under 21 years of age was absolutely prohibited.

In 1950 new infant classes and kindergartens were opened, while a rural normal institute was set up to provide specialist training in rural education for certificated teachers on paid leave of absence. Refresher courses were instituted for the teachers of handicapped children, while grants-in-aid were made to seventeen training college courses for young teachers-in-training from the interior of the country. Law 11413 authorized the Executive Branch "to take from General Revenue the sum of $25,000.00 (twenty-five thousand pesos) for the payment of expenses caused by the intensification of the smallpox vaccination campaign throughout the territory of the Republic, organized by the Ministry of Public health." Law 11431 authorized the Executive Branch to "dispose of General Revenues the sum of $25,000. (twenty-five thousand pesos) monthly and until the respective budget is approved, aimed at combating epidemic outbreaks that affect children, including scarlet fever, typhoid, measles, gastroenteritis and broncho-pulmonary conditions, etc."

Also in 1950, mothers were given the right to claim maternity retirement benefits after working for 10 years. These benefits were originally introduced in the 1920s for certain groups. In addition, an Act of February the 14th 1951 established a Special Retirement Benefit Fund for workers and civil servants affiliated with the Retirement and Pension Fund for members of the armed forces, teachers, civil servants, and other members of public services. The services provided by the Fund were comprehensive, as noted by one study:

Benefits are provided for those who retire after thirty, thirty-six or forty years of service. The special benefit amounts to six times the average monthly salary of the last year in service after thirty years and is proportionally higher after thirty-six or forty years. Services rendered in public service enterprises which were nationalized or have become the property of municipalities or which at some future date will become the property of the State or a municipality will be treated on the same basis as those rendered in the public administration. In case of death of anyone who dies while still in the service, but who by the number of years in the service has acquired a right under this Act, the widow, sons under eighteen years, unmarried daughters or, in their absence, the widowed mother or incapacitated father of the beneficiary shall be entitled to the benefit.

== Agreement with Herrera ==
During his presidency, Batlle Berres needed support to secure the support of some laws which he didn't have from his cousins in the List 14 faction. This led to him seeking to reach an agreement with Luis Alberto de Herrera. Conversations were held between the two which led to what Herrera dubbed the "Patriotic Coincidence". This agreement represented the distrust Batlle Berres felt towards minority sectors within the Colorado Party that were quite distant from his own ideological position, and according one observer allowed him "to defuse possible blackmail from minority factions within the party and, on the other, to count on the votes of nationalist legislators on many of the laws that the government would promote." This strategy bore fruit, with developments such as the transformation of the National Port Authority into an Autonomous Entity, co-participation in state agencies, with oversight and streamlining of public management, and the separation of the Pension Fund into three different entities; a Civil Fund, a Rural Fund, and an Industry and Commerce Fund.

Apart from the Herrera faction, the Batlle Berres government was supported by other smaller forces such as the Socialists. However, Herrera later abandoned the "coincidence" approach. In 1950, "The Un-Holy Alliance between the President's Batllista section of the Colorado Party and the Herrerista Blancos, which had assured him a majority in Parliament, broke down; the non- Batllista Colorados took advantage of the president's weakened position to press more strongly for consideration of their counsels and nominees," as one authority put it.

== President of Uruguay (2nd period of office) ==
Following the Uruguayan general election of 1954, Batlle Berres returned to the presidency, going on to serve as President of the National Council of Government (Uruguay) from 1955 to 1956. The Batlle Pacheco brothers attempted to block the possibility of a second Batlle Berres presidency through El Día, but failed.

The elections were a victory for Batlle Berres’ List 15 faction over the rival List 14 faction in the internal Colorado competition as well as over the Nationalists. According to one journal

The ballot boxes confirmed Luis Batlle's popularity and supported his statist policies. But the country's circumstances were no longer the same as in 1947, when he assumed the Presidency following the death of Tomás Berreta. A period of stagnation had begun, marked by high inflation and constant labor conflicts. And the international environment was adverse, with falling commodity prices and European protectionism.

One historian has argued that Batlle Berres’ second presidency marked "the beginning of the long political and economic crisis that would result in the military coup in June 1973." Nevertheless, further reforms were realized during his second presidency. A decree dated May the 10th 1955 authorized the Family Allowance Compensation Funds (as noted by one study) "to provide free services for the physical and social rehabilitation of children suffering from strabismus who are beneficiaries of the said funds." A decree of May the 17th 1955 granted privileges to invalids for the purpose of importing specially constructed automobiles, and an Act of December the 21st 1955 granted preferential treatment (for the purpose of obtaining leave of absence and pension benefits) to persons suffering from true or atypical tumour. Another Decree of May the 17th 1955 enacted rules aimed at ensuring that that employers (as noted by one study) "strictly observed the wage scales established by the wage boards."

Acts were introduced on 21 June and 20 December 1955 that authorized the granting of loans to workers in the printing trades and to metallurgical workers who were involved in labour disputes, while an Act of September the 21st 1955 provided (as noted by one study) "that the heirs of members and secretaries of the Senate and House of Representatives are entitled to the benefit of the change in the rate of the allowances now payable." A decree of September the 6th 1955 increased the minimum combined family allowance for family units with more than three dependants, while a decree of October the 25th 1955 provided that family allowances would be payable as soon as the beneficiary fulfilled the statutory conditions. An Act of December the 28th 1955 increased the "ceiling" wage or salary or wage which can be paid to recipients of family allowances. An Act was also introduced in 1955 to amend the rules governing the Mortgage Bank of Uruguay, with the aim of promoting construction.

Towards the end of his second presidency, there was speculation of there being a duel between Batlle Berres and Washington Guadalupe, the editor of La Nacional, after the latter had accused the president of safeguarding private interests and serving as a financial agent to the managing editor of Acción; the president’s own paper. Acción responded by stating that "apparently in the presence of low minded people: only those who have dirty souls can write such things." Batlle Berres was challenged to a duel by Guadalupe but refused to retract his editorial and both named seconds to discuss this "matter of honor." In the end, a court of honor called off the duel. Later, in 1957, Batlle Berres took part in a duel with retired general Juan Pedro Ribas which led to both men being injured and the duel being ordered to stop by a physician after the second round.

== Economic policies ==
Within the Colorado Party, he is widely acknowledged for being the founder of the political period known as Neo-Batllismo. Lasting until 1958, this corresponded to (as noted by one to one study) "the work deployed from the state by the Partido Colorado led by Luis Batlle Berres to implement a national project that picked up on the Batllist tradition and was capable of achieving ambitious goals in terms of social and economic progress" (Nahum et al., 2011: 94). A supporter of economic development based on import-substitution industrialization and agricultural expansion, Batlle Berres applied interventionist and statist economic measures to promote such development and didn't abide by the IMF's austerity recommendations. Industry and agriculture was supported through credits and subsidies, together with control over the nation's currency. According to one study, this was "a fact that brought him into conflict with ranchers. BROU, which controlled sales of foreign currency, paid less for foreign currency earned from livestock raising to favor industrial requirements for raw materials and machinery. This differential exchange rate policy stimulated the development of light industry, more than 90 percent of which was directed toward the internal market." Profitable prices were nevertheless guaranteed by the state for agriculture and stimulated imports of agricultural machinery, while new crops were developed to supply industry with raw materials and surpluses were exported. However, livestock raising continued to stagnate. Price intervention was also carried out, with a law of September the 19th 1947 granting broad powers to the Executive Power to insure supplies and prevent excessive increases in prices of articles of prime necessities.

During his first presidency Uruguay experienced, according to one biography, "a moment of economic prosperity thanks above all to the Korean War, which produced an increase in foreign trade." Batlle Berres also favoured modernizing industry by safeguarding national investors and he carried out a plan to nationalize companies that remained under British control, such as the water company and the railway. During his presidency, the railroads, water supply, Montevideo's trams, port facilities, and foreign meatpacking plants were nationalized. Great Britain also gave in to pressure from Batlle Berres to pay off the debt it had contracted with Uruguay during the Second World War for the supply of meat.

When successfully seeking a second term as president in 1954, the election promises made by his new administration indicated a continuation of the interventionist economic policies of the first. Apart from extended social benefits, these included efforts to boost industrial production through measures including special tax and exchange concessions and protection to industry, together with increased livestock and agricultural production via the development of new markets, the channelling of exports to nations that paid the highest prices, lower prices for fertilizer and farming equipment, and increased technical support.

Luis Batlle's economic measures reflected his own philosophical outlook. He planned that the State should be the source of regulation between capital and labor and in that sense, according to one study," assigned it a protective function, although without considering competing or intervening with private companies." He saw intervention was only legitimate when the private company was unaware of the general interest: "When the private company is unaware of that interest and attempts to take advantage of the freedom granted to it for purposes contrary to it, state interventionism will be imposed as a primary duty," an approach translated into the need for the State to harmonize the relations between capital and labor:

The main function of the government-directed economy is, first and foremost, the custody and protection of the economic interests of the Republic..." The " general interest" in this case must be translated by social peace, which is achieved by anticipating the exaltation of the contradictions between dominant and dominated classes. The State must act by "promoting laws of justice and seeking the best solutions that intensify work, creating wealth...", which "is not the property of capital, but a good part of it belongs to the worker and it is fair that it be distributed fairly." equity and reaches all classes, providing well-being to all those who have produced it."

According to one study, it was generally believed that Luis Batlle

even while President, informally encouraged illegal strikes for improved wages or working conditions. As President, he could assure that his own representatives on the tripartite Wage Councils would be sympathetic to the workers' positions. Employers, interviewed in 1960, indicated that there had indeed been greater sympathy for union views during this position by Executive representatives on the Councils than was true after the Blanco victory."

The import substitution policies pursued under Batlle Berres also helped working-class living standards. According to one observer, Neo-Batllismo was popular amongst working class people in Uruguay, and also reflected the liberalism of Batlle Berres:

Luis Batlle's discourse is rooted in the liberal tradition, as it had been reinterpreted by the Batllismo of Don Pepe. Luis Batlle frequently invoked social justice, with a clear emphasis on the tutelary role of the State in protecting the most needy in society. Luisito also attacked those he considered too rich, whom he considered enemies of society, but far from considering it a discourse that presented society as divided in class struggle. For Batlle Berres, the too rich and the needy were extreme cases of a society in which the majority of the population lived under the friendly umbrella of the Batllista State. For this reason, neo-Batllismo enjoyed great support among the working class, but with a non-classist discourse, presenting itself as an alternative to a class struggle stance. Workers participated in political life not as such, but as citizens of the Batllista State. The fact that the social order was free, harmonious, and free of social antagonisms did not obey a pre-established natural order, but rather the direct result of the anticipatory strategy of the Batllista governments. More clearly than the first Batllismo, the neo-Batllista vision was one of mediation between the different social sectors through state tutelage. Almost without realizing it, after Don Luis, the Uruguay of optimism ended, and Batllismo slowly became a label.

Batlle Berres' economic program, however, was flawed in that (as noted by one historian) it depended upon "the continued prosperity of the pastoral economy and an evolving industrial sector." Following the Korean war, there was a weakening in worldwide demand for agricultural and pastoral products as protective tariffs were placed on South American beef by the United States and European countries, while demand for wool was reduced by the creation of synthetic fibers. By the end of the Fifties the income that Uruguay derived from exports fell by 32.% However, Batlle Berres convinced the National Council to "stay the course" in spite of these negative economic indicators, with costly raw materials and industrial machinery imported for expanding the industrial base, while money from borrowed from abroad and the remainder of the treasury’s reserves from the Korean War spent.

== International affairs ==
Batlle Berres was also involved in foreign policy during the course of his two presidencies. According to one observer, "One of the great moments of his political career is when he traveled to the United States, as president of the National Government Council, to defend the country's right to industrialization, hindered and confronted by the closed protectionism of the United States. and Europe. His speeches were memorable and at the United Nations he also proposed the incorporation of mainland China, then outside the international system emanating from the post-war period." Batlle Berres visited the United States in December 1955 where he was, according to an obituary, "warmly welcomed as leader of one of the freest and most democratic nations in the world." At President Eisenhower's invitation Batlle Berres had arrived in Washington along with a staff of financial and economic experts. Relations between America and Uruguay, which had traditionally been cordial, had been clouded by a United States tariff barrier against Uruguayan wool. In putting forward his case Batlle Berres noted to American officials that Uruguay was a big purchaser of American products, and Uruguay would have to look for other markets unless the U.S. removed trade obstacles. At a luncheon given by New York Mayor Wagner Batlle Berres criticized the United States for encouraging "strongman" governments in Latin America, saying that such regimes were the "very best breeding grounds" of Communism. He also received honorary degrees from Columbia and Fordham Universities while visiting New York.

In 1949, relations deteriorated between the government and communists both in Uruguay and abroad. In April that year, an international meeting at Salto of communist leaders from various South American republics was exposed by the Montevideo government. When the government was accused of persecuting communists by the Moscow radio, Batlle Berres argued “we are democrats by conviction, and have ample legislation giving rights to all parties.” He also declared that Uruguay would not admit communists who had been deported from other countries.

Batlle Berres sought to preserve his relations with Argentina and Brazil, the latter country he visited during the presidency of Marshal Eurico Gaspar Dutra, popularly elected in 1946. He also attempted a reapproachment with Juan Domingo Perón, despite the fact that they came from opposite backgrounds and represented very different civic values. According to one observer, however,

Difficult times would come later, because the Argentines who settled in Uruguay, fleeing the persecutions of Peronism, expressed themselves freely and Argentina aspired to silence them. This generated a growing confrontation that would continue and even worsen over the years, to the point that after 1950, with Luis Batlle already in the National Government Council, there was practically a cutoff in the movement of people.

In 1948, friendlier relations with Argentina were developed by Uruguay, with both nations signing an agreement to settle all further disputes between them by arbitration. A joint statement issued at the time the pact was signed revealed, as noted by one study, “Argentine-Uruguayan plans for an early commercial treaty, relaxation of controls placed on tourists passing between the two countries and joint development of the waterpower resources of the international falls at Salto Grande.” Nevertheless, relations between the two nations were strained in 1949. This was demonstrated that year when during an Inter-American regional conference of the International Labor Organization held in Montevideo Batlle Berres said in an opening address that (as noted by one study) “social justice without civil liberty was a lie and, what was serious, it was a dangerous lie;” which diplomatic circles interpreted as a reference to Juan Perón and his system.

At the end of 1954, Batlle Berres and the acting Foreign Minister of Argentina held a secret meeting aboard a yacht anchored in the broad River Plate, which separated both nations, with the aim (as noted by one journal) "to discuss ways and means of lifting, or at least puncturing, the so-called "tin curtain" between democratic Uruguay and the Argentina of Strongman Juan Perón." As a result of the meeting, the police permit for travel across the Plate was abolished by Argentina.

During a UN news conference in December 1955, Batlle Berres voiced his support for Taiwan and Red China both being members of the UN while calling for the latter to be admitted to the UN, arguing that the Peking government was a "greater menace" if Red China remained excluded from the body. Batlle Berres also proclaimed his support for more countries to become UN member states, believing that their inclusion would strengthen the organization.

During a meeting of the Council of the Organization of American States that was held in his honor, Batlle Berres warned against "flooding" Latin America with surplus products. He argued that it would be "ruinous to the health" of that area, and it was believed this was a clear reference to a recent sale of United States surplus wheat to Brazil. In a speech to the U.N. General Assembly, he stressed the importance of smaller nations, arguing that if it weren’t for them "the great powers would now be fighting."

== Post-presidency ==
In the years following the end of his presidency, Batlle Berres remained politically active as the head of the List 15 faction. In the run up to the 1958 Uruguayan general election, Batlle Berres spoke in a speech about the danger of depending "on a single item of exportable wealth," instead advocating the alternative of a "powerful industry" allowing for "full employment with good salaries." However, he also offered bills aimed at balancing the budget that would have lowered some welfare benefits and raised taxes, but this legislation was opposed by his cousins (who headed the oppositional Colorado ticket). The gridlock helped the Nationalists to emerge victorious.

In the lead up to the 1962 Uruguayan general election, Batlle Berres argued that people "voted while playing" in 1958 by trusting in the National Party, and argued that the time had come for that decision to be rectified by voting for List 15. Despite his efforts, the Nationalists triumphed again.

== Death and legacy ==
Batlle Berres died on July the 15th 1964; aged 67.

According to one observer, Batlle Berres contributed to the industrial development of Uruguay, arguing that

If anything characterized Luis Batlle's governmental action, it was the country's industrialization. He dedicated his greatest efforts to it, and for it he was harshly opposed—especially by the Herrerismo and some conservative sectors of the agricultural sector—and paved the way for a modernization process that brought us into the vanguard of that historical moment.

Another observer has argued that Batlle Berres was responsible "for the modernization of Batllismo, based on his understanding of the reality experienced in the post-war world, with its impressive changes at every level." This was demonstrated during a speech Batlle Berres delivered on August the 14th 1947, in which he asserted

We, who were formed in the last flutters of liberal philosophy of the last century and took the first steps toward the socialization of certain activities of the social organism, understand that we must continue that pace to channel it along normal paths. Rushing to be fair is to ensure tranquility; it is to provide citizens with the principal and basic elements so that they may have the happiness of living and that the benefits of progress and wealth may reach them. Rushing to be fair is to fight for order and to ensure order.

== Bibliography ==
- Sanguinetti, Julio María (2018). Luis Batlle Berres. El Uruguay del optimismo. Montevideo: Taurus.

== See also ==
- List of political families#Uruguay
- Tomás Berreta#Death and succession

Political offices
Preceded by Alberto Guani	Vice President of Uruguay; 1947	Succeeded by Alfeo Brum
Preceded by Luis Tomás Berreta	President of Uruguay; 1947–1951	Succeeded by Andrés Martínez Trueba
Preceded by Andrés Martínez Trueba	President of the National Council of Government of Uruguay; 1955–1956	Succeeded by Alberto Zubiría
