= 2004 Uruguayan constitutional referendum =

| 31 October 2004 |
- Maintain the state monopoly of drinking water and sanitation services

Results
| Choice | Votes | % |
|---|---|---|
| Yes | 1,440,006 | 64.61% |
| No | 788,924 | 35.39% |
| Valid votes | 2,228,930 | 100.00% |
| Invalid or blank votes | 0 | 0.00% |
| Total votes | 2,228,930 | 100.00% |
| Registered voters/turnout | 2,486,994 | 89.62% |

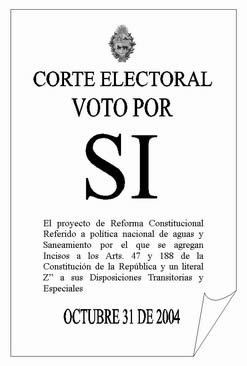
Ballot paper.

A constitutional referendum on an amendment dealing with public ownership of water supply was held in Uruguay on 31 October 2004 alongside simultaneous general election.

== Background ==
The proposed amendment to the constitution dealt with the issue of water supply and sanitation, including a statement that access to piped water and sanitation were fundamental human rights, and that

The public service of sewerage and the public service of water supplying for the human consumption, will be served exclusively and directly by state legal persons.

The amendment was supported by (victorious) presidential candidate Tabaré Vázquez and his Broad Front coalition. Friends of the Earth also supported the move, saying it "sets a key precedent for the protection of water worldwide, by enshrining these principles into the national constitution of one country by means of direct democracy."

== Results ==
| Choice | Votes | % |
|---|---|---|
| For | 1,440,006 | 64.61 |
| Against | 788,924 | 35.39 |
| Total | 2,228,930 | 100.00 |
| Valid votes | 2,228,930 | 100.00 |
| Invalid/blank votes | 0 | 0.00 |
| Total votes | 2,228,930 | 100.00 |
| Registered voters/turnout | 2,486,994 | 89.62 |
Source: Direct Democracy

== Aftermath ==
In May 2005, the government stated that contracts with private water companies would be honoured until their expiry.

== See also ==
- Uruguayan Constitution
