= National Council of Government (Uruguay) =

The National Council of Government (Spanish: Consejo Nacional de Gobierno) was the ruling body in Uruguay between 1952 and 1967. It consisted of nine members, of which six were from the party that received the most votes in general elections, and three from the runner-up party. Generally known as the colegiado system, it had previously existed as the National Council of Administration (Spanish: Consejo Nacional de Administración) between 1918 and 1933.

== History ==
The colegiado system had been first proposed by President José Batlle y Ordóñez in 1913, with the aim of creating an executive body similar to the Swiss Federal Council. Batlle had been opposed to the presidential system, believing that a collegiate body would lower the risk of a dictatorship emerging. Batlle negotiated a compromise with the National Party providing for a President and a nine-member National Council of Administration (NCA), which consisted of six members of the winning party and three from the second party. The President and the NCA had shared responsibilities. Although the new system worked well in its early years, in the early 1930s a series of conflicts between the President and the NCA led to a presidential coup by Gabriel Terra in 1933. A new constitution was drawn up, which abolished the NCA.

Constitutional amendments were put forward in 1951 which would re-establish the colegiado system, and were approved in a referendum. The new constitution came into force on 25 January 1952, and abolished the presidency. In its place was a nine-member National Council of Government (NCG), with six members from the winning party and three from the second party. The presidency of the NCG rotated among the members of the majority party. The president could only choose four members of the NCG from his own faction. The other two members of the majority party, along with the three minority members, were elected by separate votes in both houses of the legislature, with a two-thirds majority required for election.

The new NCG was found to be ineffective. The president lacked effective control over the ministers, and majorities were rarely united. Public opinion turned against the body, and a 1966 referendum abolished the body and re-established the presidency. The new constitution took effect on 15 February 1967.

== Membership ==
The first National Council of Government was presided by incumbent President Andrés Martínez Trueba until 1 March 1955. Afterwards, the Presidency of the Council was held on a yearly basis. Twelve citizens presided in succession: four Colorados (Luis Batlle Berres, Alberto Fermín Zubiría, Arturo Lezama and Carlos Fischer) and eight Blancos (Martín Echegoyen, Benito Nardone, Eduardo Víctor Haedo, Faustino Harrison, Daniel Fernández Crespo, Luis Giannattasio, Washington Beltrán, and Alberto Héber Usher).

== See also ==
- National Council of Administration
- Constitution of Uruguay of 1952
