= November 1994 Uruguayan referendum =

27 November 1994

Reject cuts in pension payments
For	72.30%
Against	27.70%

27% of the state budget for education
For	32.59%
Against	67.41%

A double constitutional referendum was held in Uruguay on 27 November 1994 alongside general elections. Voters were asked two questions; whether they approved of two initiatives, one on preventing cuts in pension payments, and one on the proportion of the state budget spent on education. The first question was approved, whilst the second was rejected.

== Initiatives ==
=== Pension cuts ===
The pension cuts referendum was initiated by the Association of Retirees through collecting signatures equal to one-tenth of the number of registered voters.

=== Education budget ===
The referendum on reserving 27% of the state budget for education was initiated by the Teachers Union by collecting the required number signatures. It would involve amending articles 214, 215 and 220 of the constitution.

== Results ==
=== Pension cuts ===
Choice	Votes	%
For	1,540,462	72.30
Against	590,156	27.70
Total	2,130,618	100
Registered voters/turnout	2,328,478	91.50
Source: Direct Democracy

=== Education budget ===
Choice	Votes	%
For	694,351	32.58
Against	1,436,267	67.42
Total	2,130,618	100
Registered voters/turnout	2,328,478	91.50
Source: Direct Democracy
