= Martín Echegoyen =

Uruguayan political figure (1891–1974)

Martín R. Echegoyen
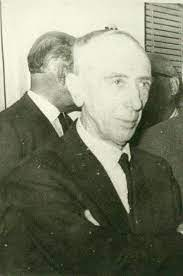
- Echegoyen

President of the Uruguayan National Council of Government
- In office 1 March 1959 – 1 March 1960
- Preceded by: Carlos Fischer
- Succeeded by: Benito Nardone

President of the State Council
- In office 19 December 1973 – 17 May 1974
- Preceded by: position established
- Succeeded by: Alberto Demicheli

Senator of Uruguay
- In office 1 March 1963 – 27 June 1973

Personal details
- Born: Martín Ricardo Echegoyen; 3 April 1891 Montevideo, Uruguay
- Died: 18 May 1974 (age 83) Montevideo, Uruguay
- Party: National Party
- Other political affiliations: Herrerismo
- Occupation: Politician, Lawyer

Martín Ricardo Echegoyen (3 April 1891 in Montevideo – 18 May 1974 in Montevideo) was a Uruguayan political figure. In the years 1959 to 1960 he was the president of the Uruguayan National Council of Government.

== Political background ==
Echegoyen was a member of the National Party, which in the 1958 elections ended the longstanding tradition of Colorado Party presidents.

He served under President Gabriel Terra as Education Minister from 1935 to 1936, and as Public Works Minister from 1936 to 1938. He later ran as the National Party's vice presidential candidate in 1946 and 1950.

For many years, he served as a prominent member of the Senate. He was its president from March 1, 1963, to March 1, 1967.

== President of the National Council of Government; later career ==
Echegoyen served as president of the National Council of Government (Uruguay) from 1959 to 1960. He was succeeded as president by Benito Nardone, a National Party colleague.

After relinquishing the presidency in 1960, Echegoyen ran for president in 1966 but was beaten by Oscar Diego Gestido.

Subsequently, already aged in his 80s, Echegoyen presided over the Council of State in the civilian-military administration instituted by President Juan María Bordaberry in 1973.

Echegoyen died on 18 May 1974 at the age of 83.

== See also ==
- Politics of Uruguay

Political offices
Preceded by Carlos Fischer	President of the Uruguayan National Council of Government; 1959–1960	Succeeded by Benito Nardone
