= Faustino Harrison =

Uruguayan politician

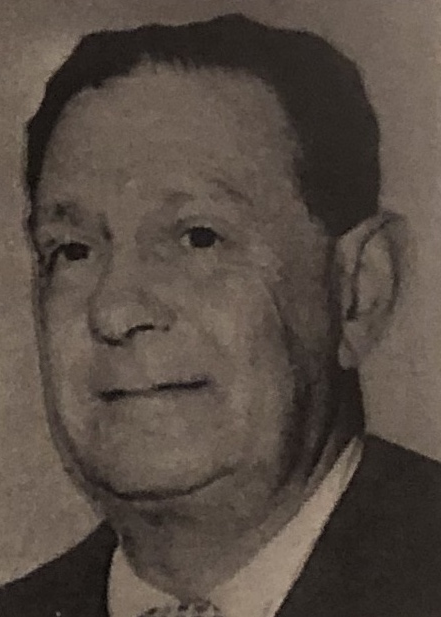
Faustino Harrison

Faustino Harrison Usoz (21 May 1900, Chamangá, Flores Department – 20 August 1963, Montevideo) was a Uruguayan politician.

== Career ==
=== President of the National Council of Government ===
Harrison was elected to the ruling nine-member National Council of Government in 1959. A member of the ruralista faction of the National Party loyal to Benito Nardone, he proposed a more ambitious Ministry of Economy that would take greater responsibility for economic planning – an idea that would not come to fruition. From 1 March 1962 he served a one year term as President of the National Council, as the National Council officials rotated the chairmanship among themselves during their periods in office.

== Death ==
Harrison died of a heart attack on 20 August 1963 in Montevideo, a few months after completing his presidential term.

== See also ==
- Politics of Uruguay

Political offices
Preceded by Eduardo Victor Haedo	President of the Uruguayan National Council of Government (National Government Council); 1962 – 1963	Succeeded by Daniel Fernández Crespo
