= Constitution of Uruguay of 1952 =

The fifth Constitution of Uruguay was in force between 1952 and 1967.

Approved in a referendum on 16 December 1951, it replaced the previous constitutional text, which had been in force since 1942.

== Overview ==
On July 31, 1951, a formal pact between the right-wing Batllist fraction of the Colorados – the Colorado and Batllist Union (Unión Colorada y Batllista – UCB) – and the Herrerist Movement (Movimiento Herrerista) of the Blancos called for a plebiscite on constitutional reform. The plebiscite the following December 16 drew less than half of the 1.1 million voters to the polls, but the collegial system was approved by a small margin.

As the culmination of an effort to reestablish the colegiado and the plural executive power, a fourth constitution was promulgated on January 25, 1952. It readopted José Batlle y Ordóñez's original proposal for coparticipation by creating a nine-member colegiado, this time called the National Council of Government (Consejo Nacional de Gobierno), with six majority-party seats and three minority-party seats. The presidency of the council rotated among the six members of the majority party. The chief executive could nominate only four of the nine ministers from his own party faction; the General Assembly selected the other five through separate votes in both chambers. An absolute majority (more than two-thirds), however, of the full membership of the two legislative chambers had to support the appointments. It thereby ensured that either the Colorados or the Blancos would get the minority seats on the colegiado. The 1952 constitution also provided for impeachment of the president by the General Assembly.

This nine-member colegiado, which headed the executive branch from 1954 to 1967, was ineffective because the president lacked control over the ministers and because the majority was seldom united. During most of this period, the National Party held power, having been elected in 1958 for the first time in over ninety years and again in 1962 when a different faction of the party was elected. The ineffectiveness of these governments caused the public to turn against the colegiado arrangement.

== See also ==
- Constitution of Uruguay
- National Council of Government (Uruguay)
- 1951 Uruguayan constitutional referendum
