= Tomás Berreta =

29th President of Uruguay

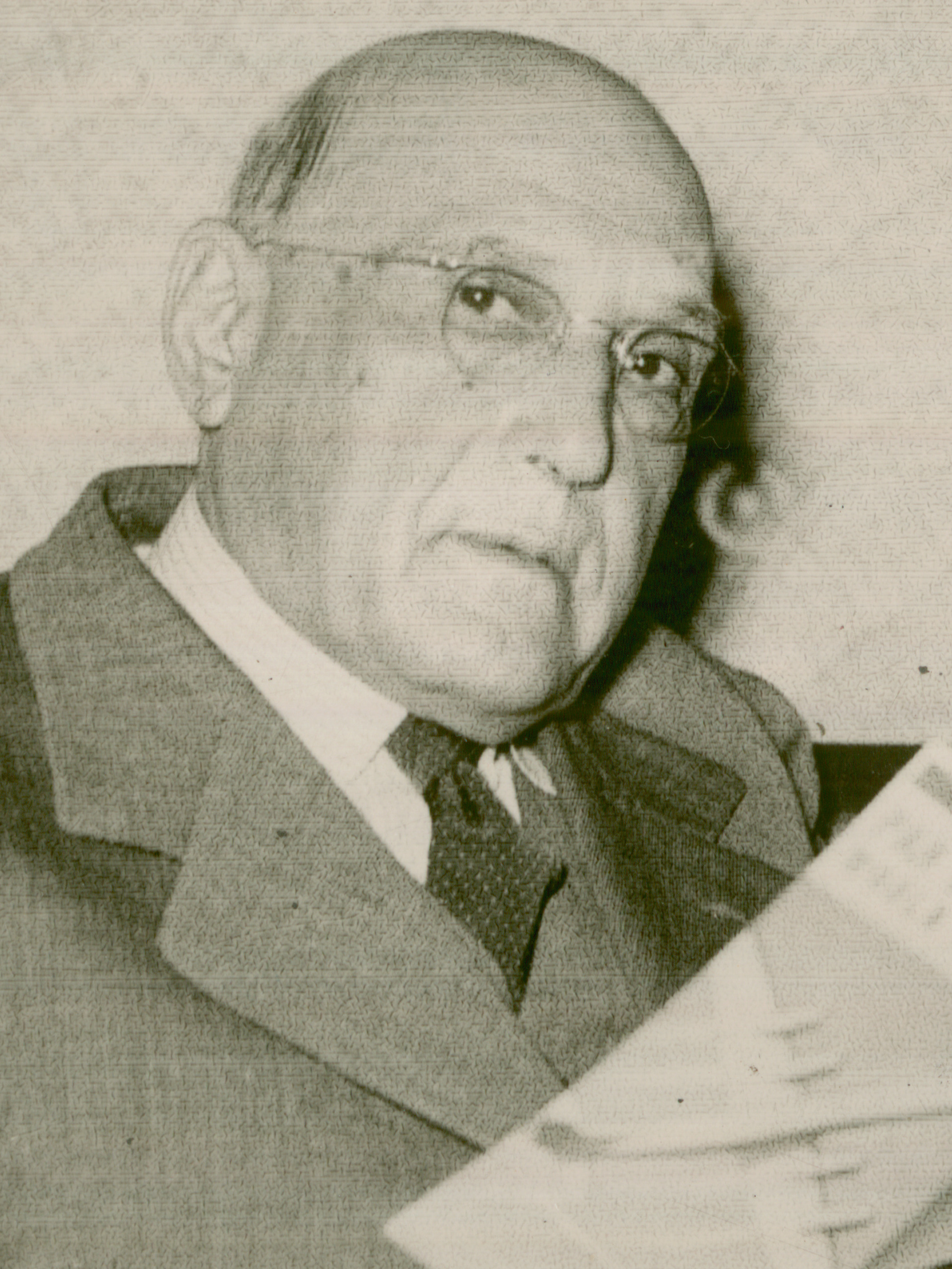
- Berreta in 1947

29th President of Uruguay
- In office March 1, 1947 – August 2, 1947
- Vice President: Luis Batlle Berres
- Preceded by: Juan José de Amézaga
- Succeeded by: Luis Batlle Berres

Personal details
- Born: November 22, 1875 Montevideo, Uruguay
- Died: August 2, 1947 (aged 72) Montevideo, Uruguay
- Party: Colorado Party
- Spouse: Juanita Etchemendy
- Children: Blanca Ana, Rivera, Sarandi, María, Tabaré
- Tomás Berreta's voice Speech by Tomás Berreta to Brazilian president Eurico Dutra (recorded 1947)

Tomás Berreta Gandolfo (November 22, 1875 – August 2, 1947) was the President of Uruguay for five months in 1947.

== Background ==
Having been an activist in the Uruguayan Colorado Party since 1896, for several years he was active in local politics and served as Intendent of Canelones in the early part of the 20th century.

He served as President of the Senate of Uruguay in 1943. He later served in the government of President Juan José de Amézaga.

Berreta was thus a prominent, elderly member of the Uruguayan Colorado Party, which had ruled the country for long periods, when he stood for election as President, intending to succeed the sitting President of Uruguay, Juan José de Amézaga, who was younger than he by several years.

== President of Uruguay ==
=== March 1947 inauguration ===
Berreta was inaugurated as President of Uruguay on 1 March 1947.

A longstanding military man by profession, President Berreta was notably responsible for founding the Liceo Militar General Artigas, Montevideo, a secondary school in the nation's capital to be run on military lines.

During his brief office period, President Berreta travelled to meet US President Harry S. Truman in Washington, DC.

=== Death and succession ===
Berreta died in office barely five months later, on 2 August 1947, from prostate cancer.

The Vice President of Uruguay during Berreta's short Presidency was Luis Batlle Berres. Subsequently, Battle Berres succeeded Berreta as President of Uruguay.

== See also ==
- Politics of Uruguay
- (Photo) President Berretta (right, seated) and President Harry S. Truman (left, seated) at a meeting in 1947:

Political offices
Preceded by Juan José de Amézaga	President of Uruguay; 1947	Succeeded by Luis Batlle Berres
