= List of Uruguayan historians =

A list of notable historians from Uruguay:

== A ==
- Carlos Anaya
- Mariano Arana
- Orestes Araújo
- Arturo Ardao
- Leopoldo Artucio
- Fernando O. Assunção

== B ==
- Francisco Bauzá

== C ==
- Marta Canessa

== G ==
- Juan Giuria

== F ==
- Hugo Fernández Artucio

== L ==
- Rolando Laguarda Trías
- César J. Loustau
- Aurelio Lucchini

== M ==
- Carlos Maggi
- Isidoro de María
- Alberto Methol Ferré

== N ==
- Benjamín Nahum

== R ==
- Carlos Real de Azúa
- Silvia Rodríguez Villamil (1939-2003), historian, feminist, writer, activist
- Graciela Sapriza (born 1945), Uruguayan historian, educator

== S ==
- Oscar Secco Ellauri

== Z ==
- Alberto Zum Felde

== See also ==
- History of Uruguay
