= History of Uruguay =

The history of Uruguay comprises different periods: the pre-Columbian time or early history (up to the 16th century), the Colonial Period (1516–1811), the Period of Nation-Building (1811–1830), and the history of Uruguay as an independent country (1830–present).

Written history began with the arrival of Spanish chroniclers in the expedition of Juan Díaz de Solís in 1516 to the Río de la Plata, which marks the beginning of Spanish occupation of the region.

In 1527 the first European settlement was established in the territory of present-day Uruguay. It was called Sán Lázaro and founded by Sebastian Cabot who was in command of a Spanish expedition. In 1777 the Spanish Crown established the Viceroyalty of the Río de la Plata, which began to disintegrate with the Revolution of May 1810.

The territory of present-day Uruguay was invaded by the United Kingdom of Portugal, Brazil and the Algarve, initially becoming part of the Portuguese kingdom as Cisplatina Province. In 1824 it was annexed to the Empire of Brazil, and a year later it declared its independence, which began the Cisplatine War. In 1828, with British mediation, a peace agreement was signed and the independence of Uruguay was recognized. In 1830 the country's first constitution was promulgated.

== Native ==
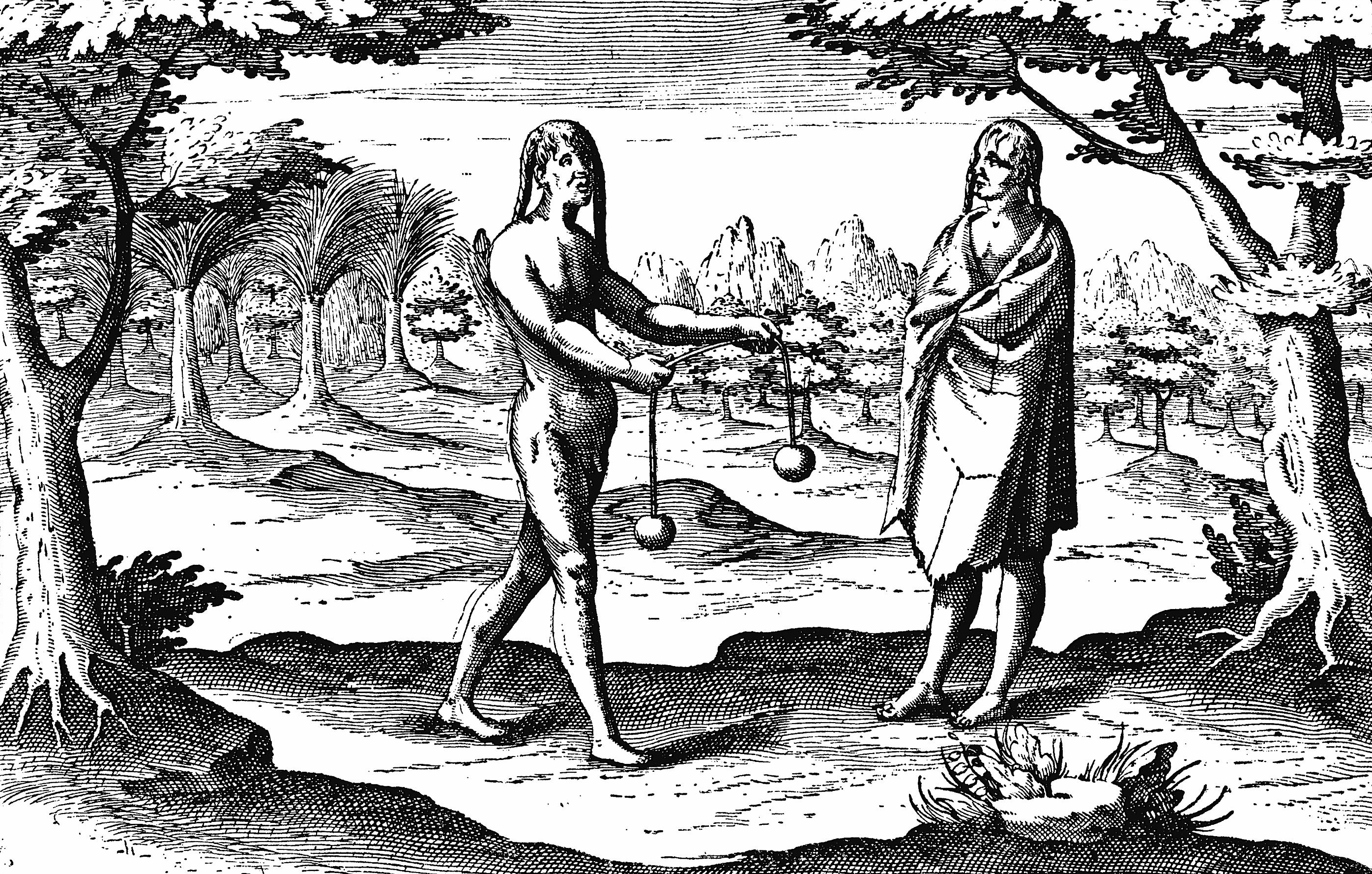
Uruguayan Indians, drawing from Hendrick Ottsen journal, 1603 CE

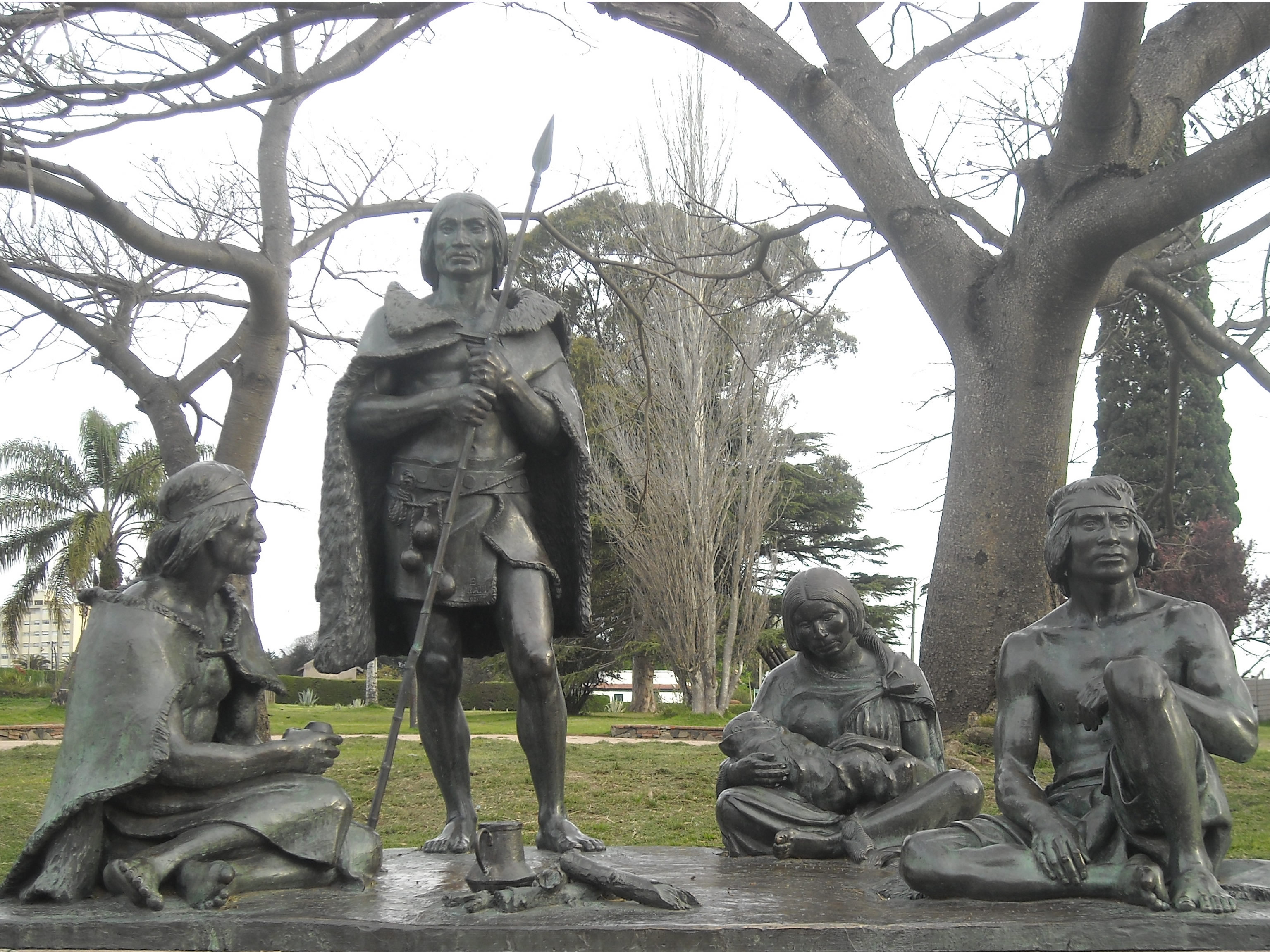
Monument to Charruas in Montevideo

The earliest traces of human presence are about 10,000 years old and belong to the hunter-gatherer cultures of Catalanense and Cuareim cultures, which are extensions of cultures originating in Brazil. The earliest discovered bolas is about 7,000 years old. Examples of ancient rock art have been found at Chamangá. About 4,000 years ago, Charrúa and Guarani people arrived here. During precolonial times, Uruguayan territory was inhabited by small tribes of nomadic Charrúa, Chaná, Arachán, and Guarani peoples who survived by hunting and fishing and probably never reached more than 10,000 to 20,000 people. It is estimated that there were about 9,000 Charrúa and 6,000 Chaná and Guaraní at the time of first contact with Europeans in the 1500s. The native peoples had almost disappeared by the time of Uruguay's independence as a result of European diseases and constant warfare.

European genocide culminated on 11 April 1831 with the Massacre of Salsipuedes, when most of the Charrúa men were killed by the Uruguayan army on the orders of President Fructuoso Rivera. The remaining 300 Charrúa women and children were divided as household slaves and servants among Europeans.

== Colonization ==
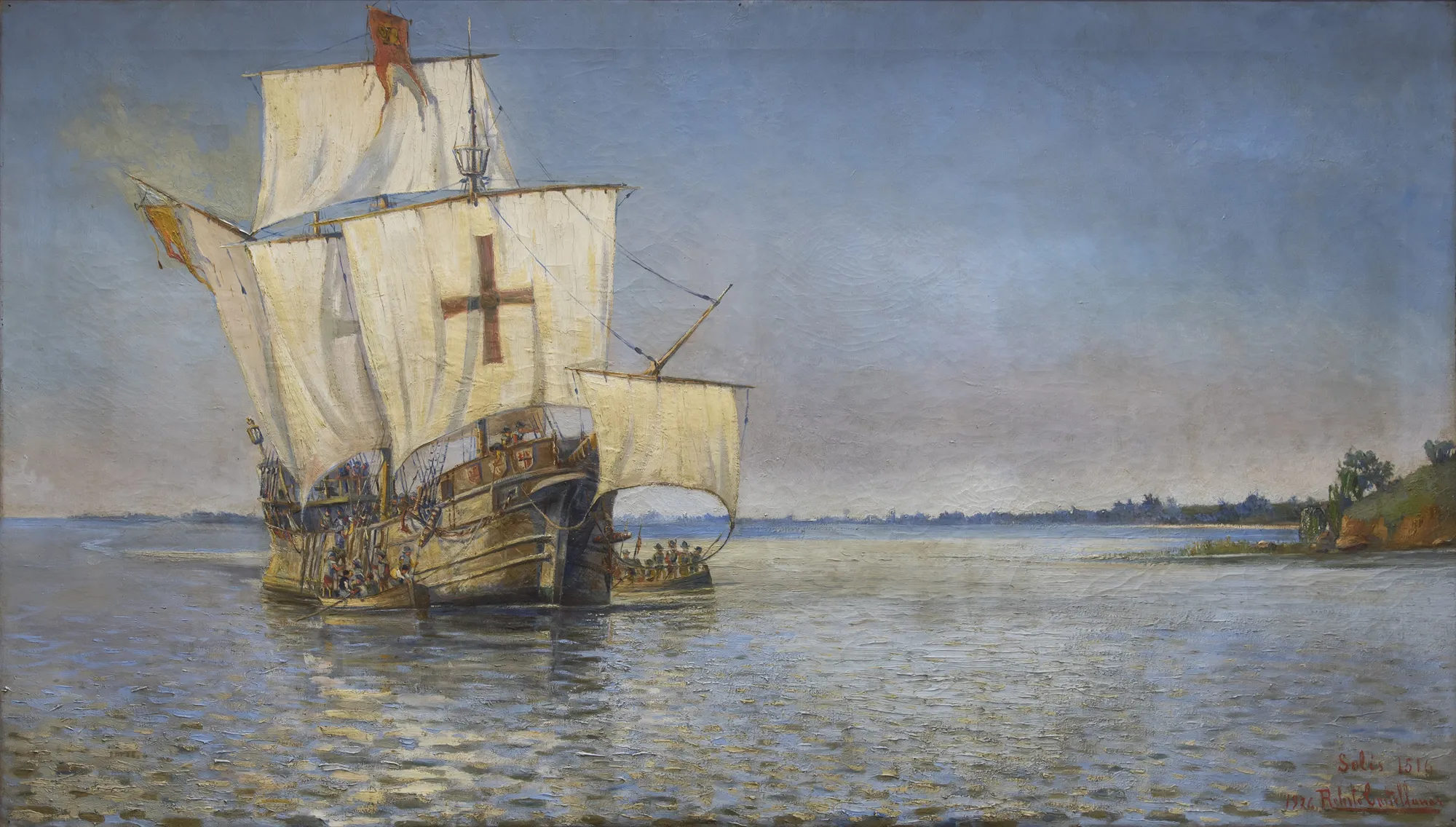
Disembarkment of Juan Díaz de Solís, the first european to set foot in Uruguay in 1516.

During the colonial era, the present-day territory of Uruguay was known as Banda Oriental (east bank of River Uruguay) and was a buffer territory between the competing colonial pretensions of Portuguese Brazil and the Spanish Empire. The Portuguese first explored the region of present-day Uruguay in 1512–1513.

The first European explorer to land there was Juan Díaz de Solís in 1516, but he was killed by natives. Ferdinand Magellan anchored at the future site of Montevideo in 1520. Sebastian Cabot in 1526 explored Río de la Plata, but no permanent settlements were established at that time. The absence of gold and silver limited the settlement of the region during the 16th and 17th centuries. In 1603, cattle and horses were introduced by the order of Hernando Arias de Saavedra, and, by the mid-17th century, their number had greatly multiplied. The first permanent settlement on the territory of present-day Uruguay was founded by Spanish Jesuits in 1624 at Villa Soriano on the Río Negro, where they tried to establish a Misiones Orientales system for the Charrúas.

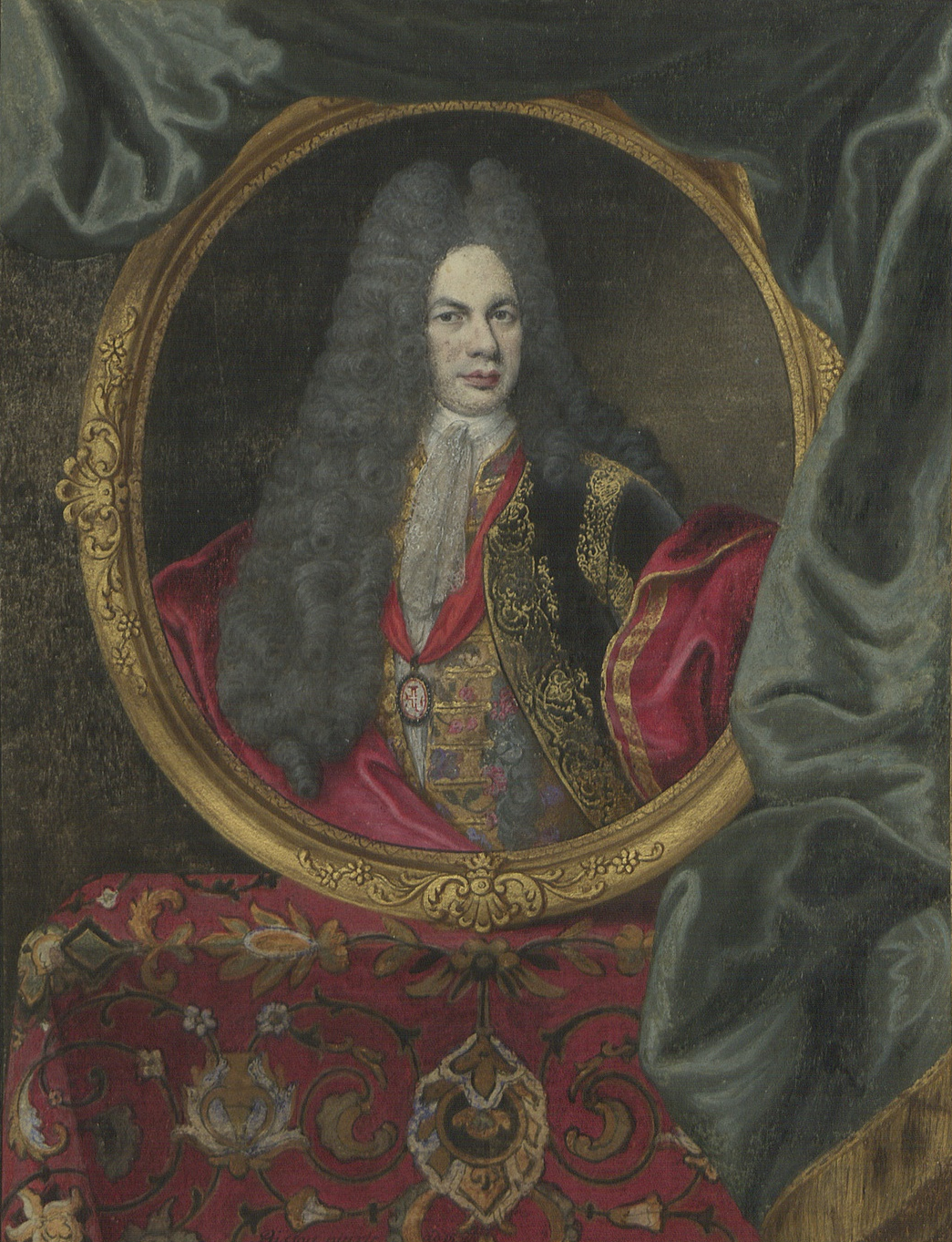
Diplomat Luís da Cunha negotiated Portugal's annexation of Uruguay at the Congress of Utrecht in 1713–15.

In 1680, Portuguese colonists established Colônia do Sacramento on the northern bank of La Plata river, on the opposite coast from Buenos Aires. Spanish colonial activity increased as Spain sought to limit Portugal's expansion of Brazil's frontiers. In 1726, the Spanish established San Felipe de Montevideo on the northern bank and its natural harbor soon developed into a commercial center competing with Buenos Aires. They also moved to capture Côlonia del Sacramento. The 1750 Treaty of Madrid secured Spanish control over Banda Oriental, settlers were given land here and a local cabildo was created.

In 1776, the new Viceroyalty of Rio de la Plata was established with its capital at Buenos Aires, and it included the territory of Banda Oriental. By this time, the land had been divided among cattle ranchers, and beef was becoming a major product. By 1800, more than 10,000 people lived in Montevideo and another 20,000 in the rest of the province. Out of these, about 30 percent were African slaves.

Uruguay's early 19th-century history was shaped by an ongoing conflict between the British, Spanish, Portuguese, and local colonial forces for dominance of the La Plata Basin. In 1806 and 1807, during the Anglo-Spanish War (1796–1808), the British launched invasions. Buenos Aires was taken in 1806 and then liberated by forces from Montevideo led by Santiago de Liniers. In a new and stronger British attack in 1807, Montevideo was occupied by a 10,000-strong British force. The British forces were unable to invade Buenos Aires for the second time, however, and Liniers demanded the liberation of Montevideo in the terms of capitulation. The British gave up their attacks when the Peninsular War turned Great Britain and Spain into allies against Napoleon.

== Struggle for independence, 1811–1828 ==
=== Provincial freedom under Artigas ===
Flag of Artigas

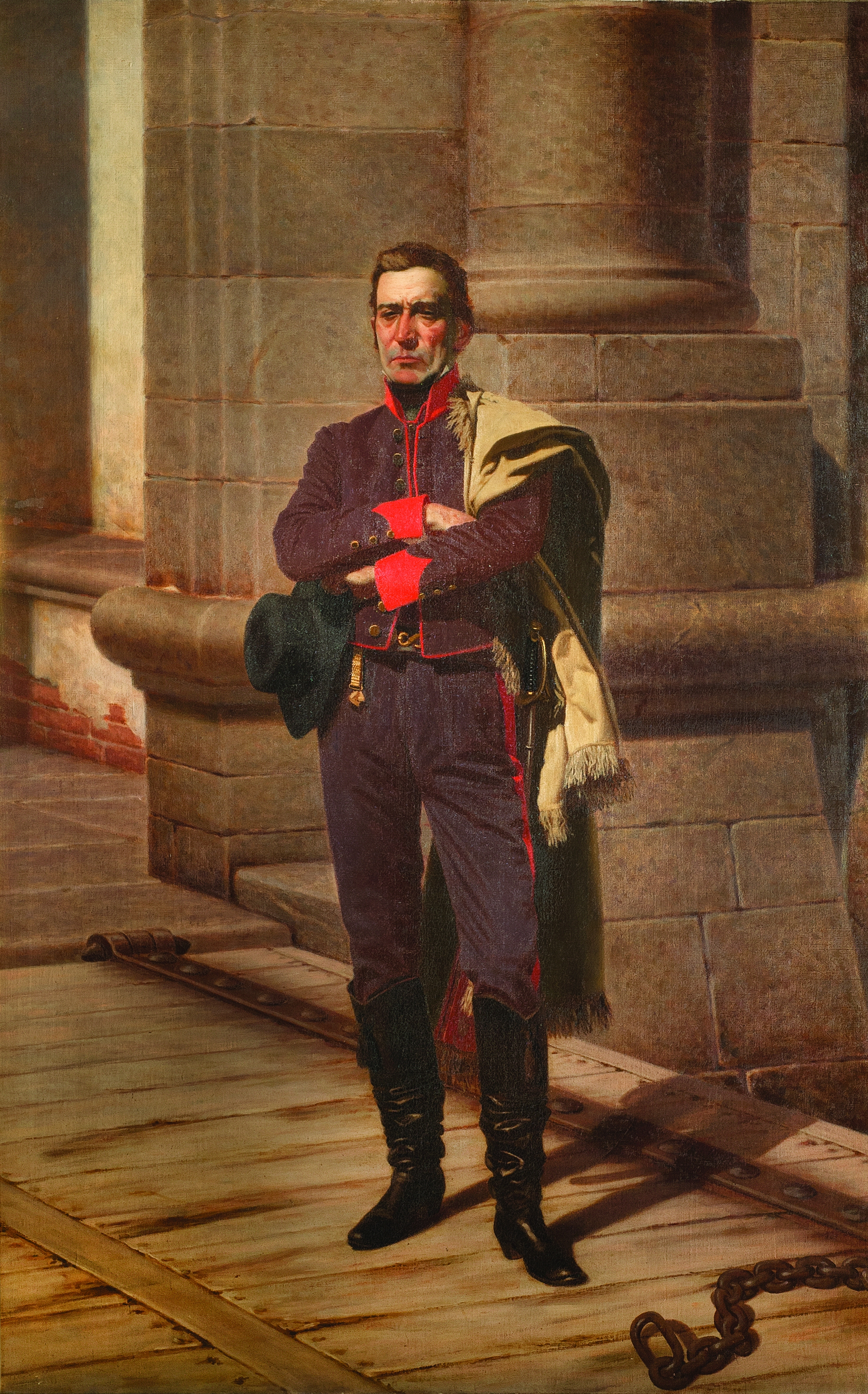
José Gervasio Artigas, as depicted by Juan Manuel Blanes

Provincial political allegiances in 1816 CE

The May Revolution of 1810 in Buenos Aires marked the end of Spanish rule in the Vice-royalty and the establishment of the United Provinces of the Río de la Plata. The Revolution divided the inhabitants of Montevideo between royalists, who remained loyal to the Spanish crown (many of which remained so), and revolutionaries, who supported the independence of the provinces from Spain. This soon led to the First Banda Oriental campaign between Buenos Aires and the Spanish viceroy.

Local patriots under José Gervasio Artigas issued the Proclamation of 26 February 1811, which called for a war against the Spanish rule. With the help from Buenos Aires, Artigas defeated Spaniards on 18 May 1811 at the Battle of Las Piedras and began Siege of Montevideo. At this point, Spanish viceroy invited Portuguese from Brazil to launch a military invasion of Banda Oriental. Afraid to lose this province to the Portuguese, Buenos Aires made peace with the Spanish viceroy. British pressure persuaded the Portuguese to withdraw in late 1811, leaving the royalists in control of Montevideo. Angered by this betrayal by Buenos Aires, Artigas, with some 4,000 supporters, retreated to Entre Ríos Province. During the Second Banda Oriental campaign in 1813, Artigas joined José Rondeau's army from Buenos Aires and started the second siege of Montevideo, resulting in its surrender to Río de la Plata.

Artigas participated in the formation of the League of the Free People, which united several provinces that wanted to be free from the dominance of Buenos Aires and create a centralized state as envisaged by the Congress of Tucumán. Artigas was proclaimed Protector of this League. Guided by his political ideas (Artiguism), he launched a land reform, dividing land to small farmers.

=== Brazilian province ===
The steady growth of the influence and prestige of the Liga Federal frightened the Portuguese government, which did not want the League's republicanism to spread to the adjoining Portuguese colony of Brazil. In August 1816, forces from Brazil invaded and began the Portuguese conquest of the Banda Oriental with the intention of destroying Artigas and his revolution. The Portuguese forces included a fully armed force of disciplined Portuguese European veterans of the Napoleonic Wars with local Brazilian troops. This army, with more military experience and material superiority, occupied Montevideo on 20 January 1817. In 1820, Artigas's forces were finally defeated in the Battle of Tacuarembó, after which Banda Oriental was incorporated into Brazil as its Cisplatina province. During the Brazilian War of Independence in 1822–1825, another siege of Montevideo occurred.

== The Thirty-Three ==
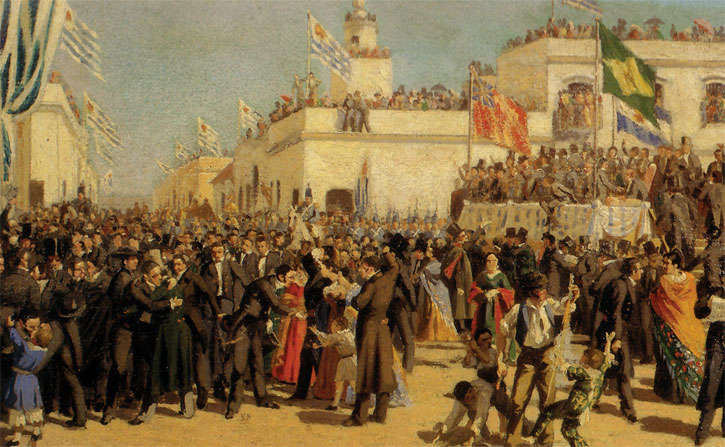
Proclamation of Constitution of 1830 CE

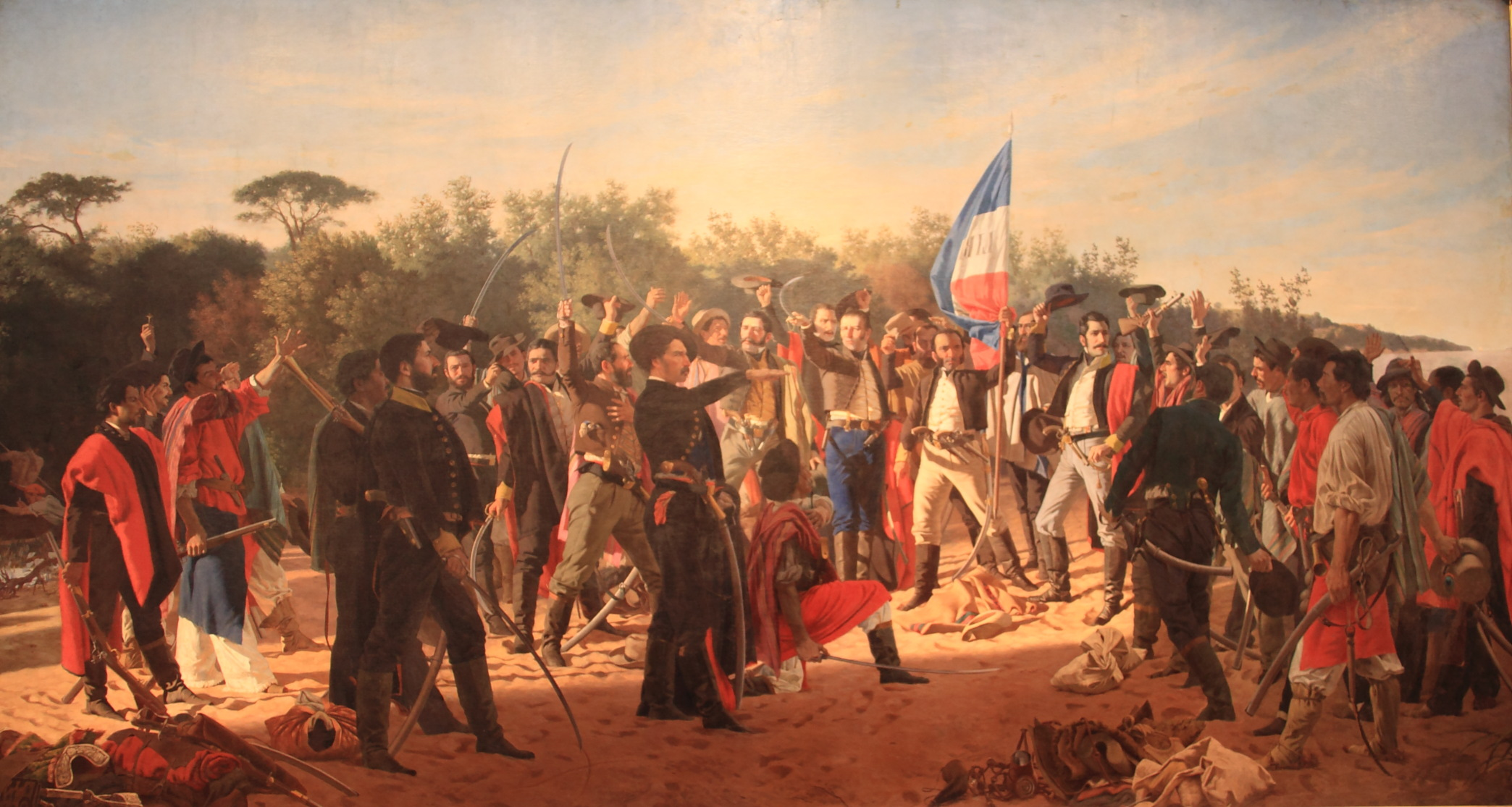
Oath of the Thirty-Three

Flag of the Thirty-Three

On 19 April 1825, with the support of Buenos Aires, the Thirty-Three Orientals, led by Juan Antonio Lavalleja, landed in Cisplatina. They reached Montevideo on 20 May. On 14 June, in La Florida, a provisional government was formed. On 25 August, the newly elected provincial assembly declared the secession of Cisplatina province from the Empire of Brazil and allegiance to the United Provinces of the Río de la Plata. In response, Brazil launched the Cisplatine War.

This war ended on 27 August 1828 when Treaty of Montevideo was signed. After mediation by Viscount Ponsonby, a British diplomat, Brazil and Argentina agreed to recognize an independent Uruguay as a buffer state between them. As with Paraguay, however, Uruguayan independence was not completely guaranteed, and only the Paraguayan War secured Uruguayan independence from the territorial ambitions of its larger neighbors. The Constitution of 1830, drafted by a constituent assembly, was approved in September 1829 and adopted on 18 July 1830.

== The "Guerra Grande", 1839–1852 ==
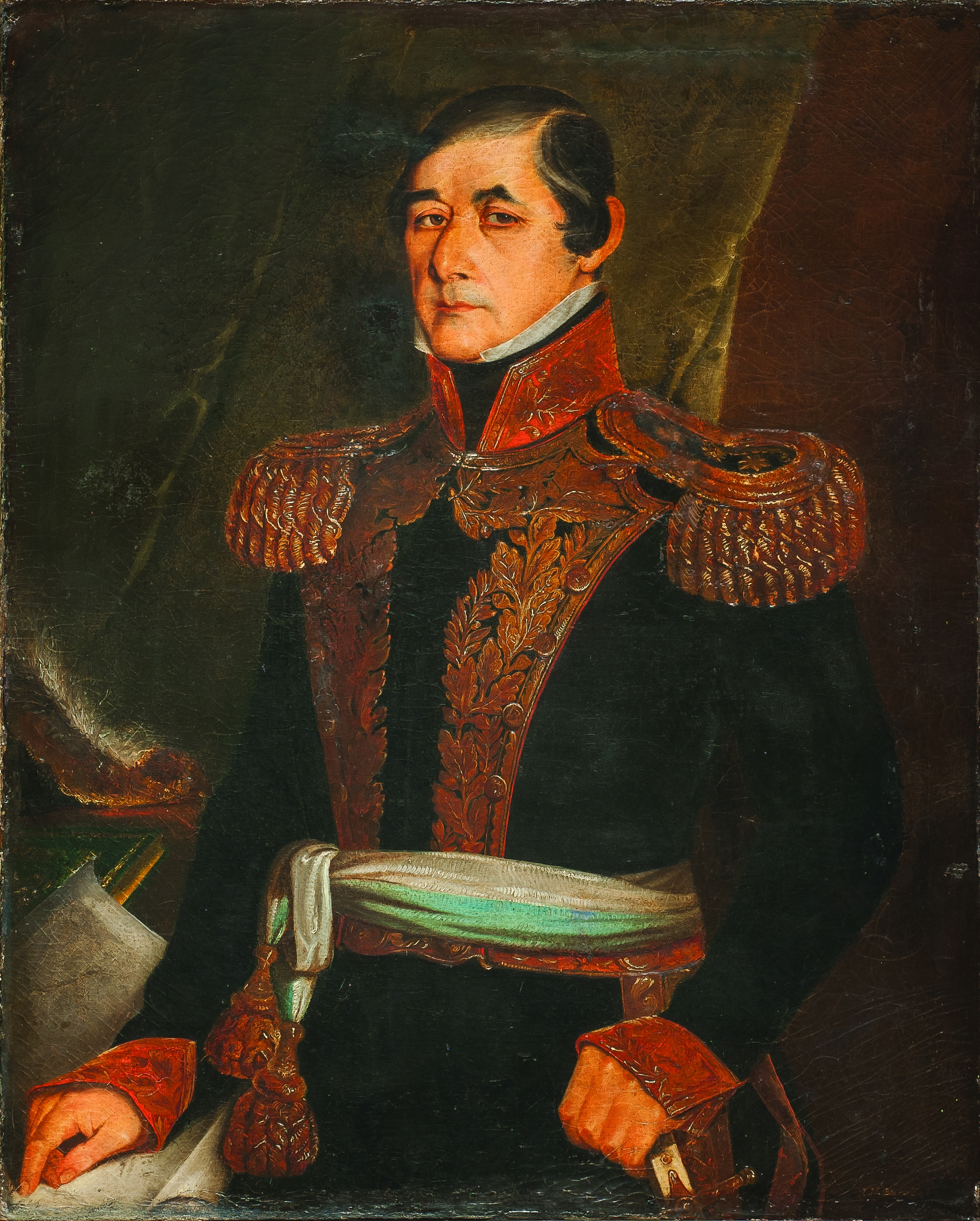
Fructuoso Rivera

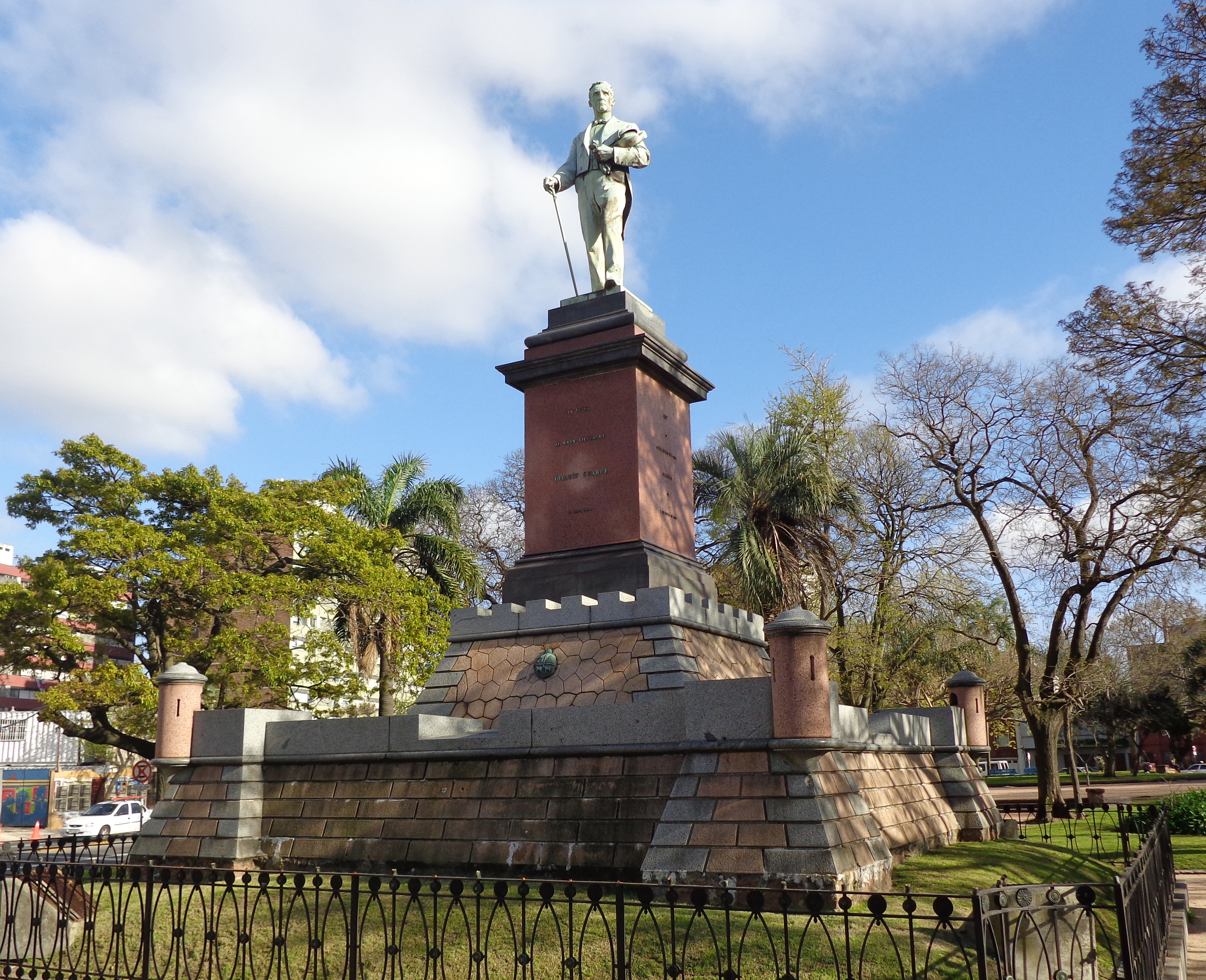
Joaquín Suárez monument in Montevideo

Soon after achieving independence, the political scene in Uruguay became split between two new parties, both splinters of the former Thirty-Three: the conservative Blancos ("Whites") and the liberal Colorados ("Reds"). The Colorados were led by the first President Fructuoso Rivera and represented the business interests of Montevideo; the Blancos were headed by the second President Manuel Oribe, who looked after the agricultural interests of the countryside and promoted protectionism.

Both parties took their informal names from the color of the armbands that their supporters wore. Initially, the Colorados wore blue, but, when it faded in the sun, they replaced it with red. The parties became associated with warring political factions in neighboring Argentina. The Colorados favored the exiled Argentinian liberal Unitarios, many of whom had taken refuge in Montevideo, while the Blanco president Manuel Oribe was a close friend of the Argentine ruler Juan Manuel de Rosas.

Oribe took Rosas's side when the French navy blockaded Buenos Aires in 1838. This led the Colorados and the exiled Unitarios to seek French backing against Oribe, and, on 15 June 1838, an army, led by the Colorado leader Rivera, overthrew Oribe who fled to Argentina. The Argentinian Unitarios then formed a government-in-exile in Montevideo, and, with secret French encouragement, Rivera declared war on Rosas in 1839. The conflict would last 13 years and become known as the Guerra Grande (the Great War).

In 1840, an army of exiled Unitarios attempted to invade northern Argentina from Uruguay but had little success. In 1842, the Argentinian army overran Uruguay on Oribe's behalf. They seized most of the country but failed to take the capital. The Great Siege of Montevideo, which began in February 1843, lasted nine years. The besieged Uruguayans called on resident foreigners for help. French and Italian legions were formed. The latter was led by the exiled Giuseppe Garibaldi, who was working as a mathematics teacher in Montevideo when the war broke out. Garibaldi was also made head of the Uruguayan navy.

During this siege, Uruguay had two parallel governments:

- Gobierno de la Defensa in Montevideo, led by Joaquín Suárez (1843–1852).
- Gobierno del Cerrito (with headquarters at Cerrito de la Victoria neighborhood), ruling the rest of the country, led by Manuel Oribe (1843–1851).

The Argentinian blockade of Montevideo was ineffective as Rosas generally tried not to interfere with international shipping on the River Plate, but, in 1845, when access to Paraguay was blocked, Great Britain and France allied against Rosas, seized his fleet, and began a blockade of Buenos Aires, while Brazil joined in the war against Argentina. Rosas reached peace deals with Great Britain and France in 1849 and 1850, respectively. The French agreed to withdraw their legion if Rosas evacuated Argentinian troops from Uruguay. Oribe still maintained a loose siege of the capital. In 1851, the Argentinian provincial strongman Justo José de Urquiza turned against Rosas and signed a pact with the exiled Unitarios, the Uruguayan Colorados, and Brazil against him. Urquiza crossed into Uruguay, defeated Oribe, and lifted the siege of Montevideo. He then overthrew Rosas at the Battle of Caseros on 3 February 1852. With Rosas's defeat and exile, the "Guerra Grande" finally came to an end. Slavery was officially abolished in 1852. A ruling triumvirate consisting of Rivera, Lavalleja, and Venancio Flores was established, but Lavalleja died in 1853, Rivera in 1854, and Flores was overthrown in 1855.

=== Foreign relations ===
The government of Montevideo rewarded Brazil's financial and military support by signing five treaties in 1851 that provided for a perpetual alliance between the two countries. Montevideo confirmed Brazil's right to intervene in Uruguay's internal affairs. Uruguay also renounced its territorial claims north of the Río Cuareim, thereby reducing its area to about 176,000 square kilometers (68,000 sq mi) and recognized Brazil's exclusive right of navigation in the Laguna Merin and the Rio Yaguaron, the natural border between the countries.

In accordance with the 1851 treaties, Brazil intervened militarily in Uruguay as often as it deemed necessary. In 1865, the Treaty of the Triple Alliance was signed by the Emperor of Brazil, the President of Argentina, and the Colorado general Venancio Flores, the Uruguayan head of government whom they had both helped to gain power. The Triple Alliance was created to wage a war against the Paraguayan leader Francisco Solano López. The resulting Paraguayan War ended with the invasion of Paraguay and its defeat by the armies of the three countries. Montevideo, which was used as a supply station by the Brazilian navy, experienced a period of prosperity and relative calm during this war.

== The Uruguayan War, 1864–65 ==
Uruguayan war, 1864–65

The Uruguayan War was fought between the governing Blancos and an alliance of the Empire of Brazil with the Colorados who were supported by Argentina. In 1863, the Colorado leader Venancio Flores launched the Liberating Crusade aimed at toppling President Bernardo Berro and his Colorado–Blanco coalition (Fusionist) government. Flores was aided by Argentina's President Bartolomé Mitre. The Fusionist coalition collapsed as Colorados joined Flores's ranks.

The Uruguayan civil war developed into a crisis of international scope that destabilized the entire region. Even before the Colorado rebellion, the Blancos had sought an alliance with Paraguayan dictator Francisco Solano López. Berro's now purely Blanco government also received support from Argentine Federalists, who opposed Mitre and his Unitarians. The situation deteriorated as the Empire of Brazil was drawn into the conflict. Brazil decided to intervene to reestablish the security of its southern frontiers and its influence over regional affairs. In a combined offensive against Blanco strongholds, the Brazilian–Colorado troops advanced through Uruguayan territory, eventually surrounding Montevideo. Faced with certain defeat, the Blanco government capitulated on 20 February 1865.

The short-lived war would have been regarded as an outstanding success for Brazilian and Argentine interests, had Paraguayan intervention in support of the Blancos (with attacks upon Brazilian and Argentine provinces) not led to the long and costly Paraguayan War. In February 1868, former Presidents Bernardo Berro and Venancio Flores were assassinated.

== Return to factions, 1865–75 ==
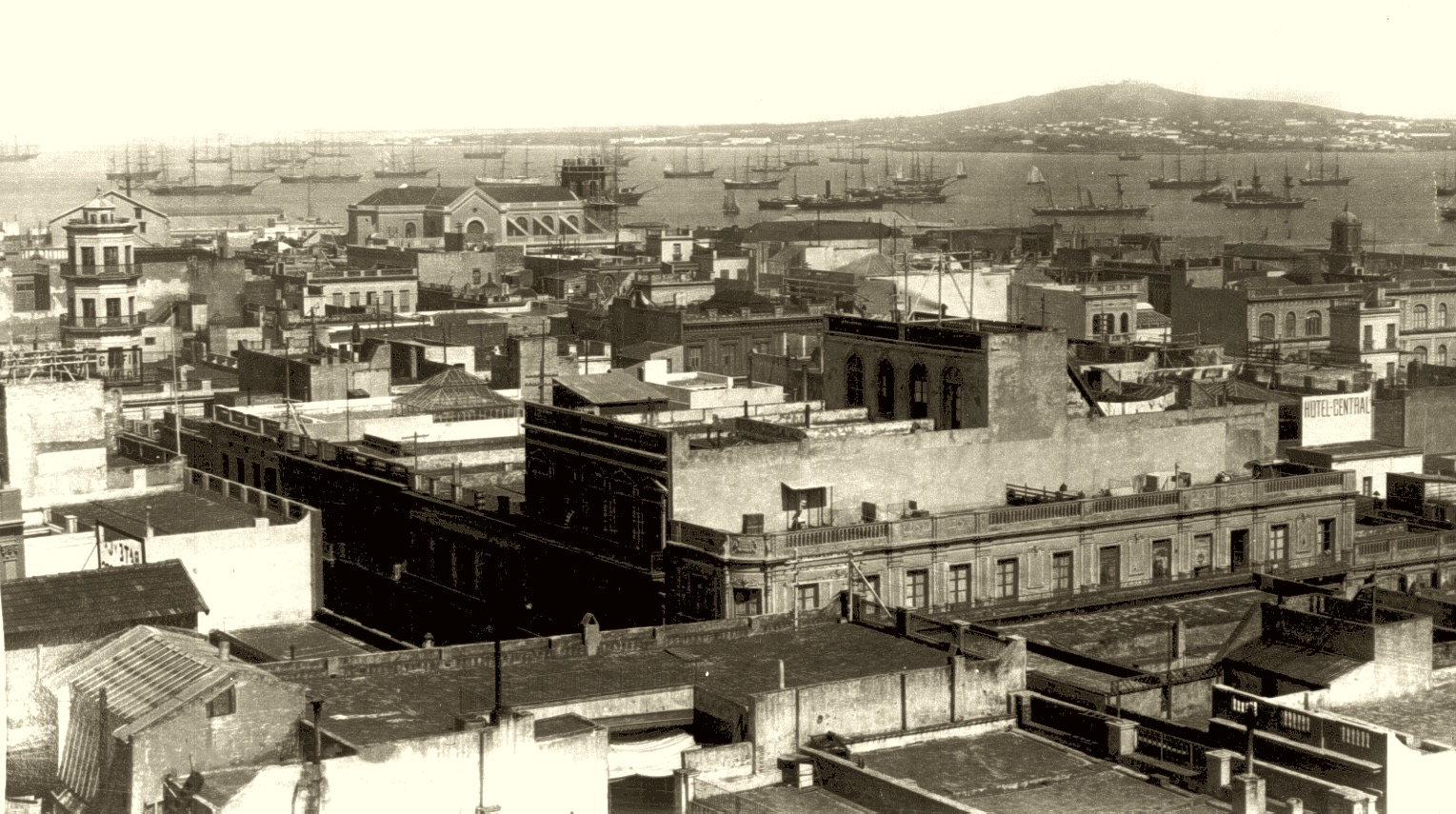
Montevideo in 1865

With the inauguration of Venancio Flores as president of Uruguay, the fusionist policy ended, once again strengthening and separating the Blanco and Colorado factions. The Colorados ruled without interruption from 1865 until 1958 despite internal conflicts, conflicts with neighboring states, political and economic fluctuations, and a wave of mass immigration from Europe.

In the 1860s Uruguay was going through a period of prosperity. Montevideo became a major economic center of the region. Thanks to its natural harbor, it became an entrepôt, or distribution hub, for goods from Argentina, Brazil, and Paraguay. The towns of Paysandú and Salto, both on the Uruguay River, also experienced similar development. In addition, new neighborhoods emerged in the city and numerous buildings began to be built. In addition, the European immigration that had begun after the Civil War continued, and Villa Cosmópolis —current Villa del Cerro— expanded.

The economy saw a steep upswing after the Civil War, above all in livestock raising and export. Between 1860 and 1868, the number of sheep rose from 3 to 17 million. The reason for this increase lay above all in the improved methods of husbandry introduced by European immigrants.

In 1866 the country's first railway network was built. The Italians set up the Camera di Commercio Italiana di Montevideo (lit. 'Italian Chamber of Commerce of Montevideo') which played a strategic role in trade with Italy and building up the Italian middle class in the city.

The government of General Lorenzo Batlle y Grau suppressed the Revolution of the Lances, which started in September 1870 under the leadership of Blanco Timoteo Aparicio. After two years of struggle, a peace agreement was signed on 6 April 1872 when a power-sharing agreement was signed giving the Blancos control over four out of the thirteen departments of Uruguay—Canelones, San Jose, Florida, and Cerro Largo—and a guaranteed, if limited representation in Parliament. This establishment of the policy of coparticipation represented the search for a new formula of compromise, based on the coexistence of the party in power and the party in opposition.

== Militarism and modernization, 1875–1890 ==
The power-sharing agreement of 1872 split the Colorados into two factions—the principistas, who were open to cooperation with the Blancos, and the netos, who were against it. In the 1873 Presidential election, the netos supported election of José Eugenio Ellauri, who was a surprise candidate with no political powerbase. Five days of rioting in Montevideo between the two Colorado factions led to a military coup on 15 January 1875. Ellauri was exiled and neto representative Pedro Varela assumed the Presidency.

In May 1875, the principistas began the Tricolor Revolution, which was defeated later in the year by an unexpected coalition of Blanco leader Aparicio Saravia and the Army under the command of Lorenzo Latorre. Between 1875 and 1890, the military became the center of political power. The country was going through an unstable situation, so representatives of the two major pressure groups, the Asociación Rural del Uruguay —which brought together the hacendados— and the Alto Comercio Montevideano —which brought together businessmen dedicated to foreign trade—, offered Latorre to take power.

On 10 March 1876, Latorre overthrew the government of Pedro Varela Olivera and established a strong executive presidency, initiating the period known as Militarismo (Spanish for 'Militarism'). The central aims of Latorre’s regime were the restoration of domestic stability, the consolidation of public order—particularly in rural areas—and the strengthening of private property rights. To this end, a series of institutional and administrative reforms were introduced, contributing to the modernization of the country and the development of a more centralized state apparatus.

To strengthen security and maintain order, the armed forces and police institutions were professionalized and modernized. The National Army obtained a monopoly over Mauser and Remington rifles, giving it a significant military advantage over potential uprisings and serving as a deterrent against armed opposition. The Rural Police was established to combat livestock theft and cattle rustling. To guarantee property rights, the Rural Code was enacted, introducing the mandatory fencing of rural lands, while the Oficina de Marcas y Señales (Spanish for 'Trademark and Signals Office') was created to register livestock ownership.

In 1877 the "Common Education Law" was passed, which was based on a bill by José Pedro Varela and which laid the foundations of the Uruguayan educational system. Also known as the Reforma Vareliana (Spanish for 'Varelian Reform'), it established universal, compulsory, and free education, although the original intention of introducing secular education was abandoned in order to avoid deteriorating relations between the government and the Catholic Church. Instead, parents were required to specify whether they wished their children to receive catechism classes. The establishment of public education contributed to the strengthening of the Spanish language in areas near the border with Portuguese-speaking Brazil, as well as to the integration of immigrants.

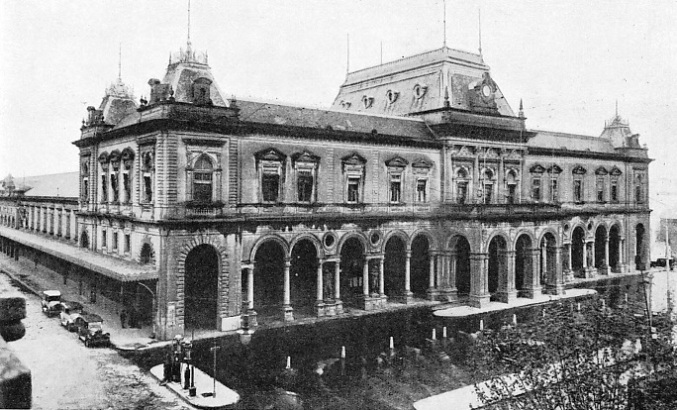
The eclectic-style General Artigas railway station was inaugurated in 1897 and has served as Montevideo's main station ever since.

With the passing of the "General Law of Railway Routes", the railway network was regulated and expanded, with the formation of the first companies with British capital. The railways converged in Montevideo, which made it possible to transport raw materials and manufactured products to the country's main port, as well as enabling the faster movement of troops to any part of the territory in the event of an armed uprising. The telegraph line was also expanded throughout the country.

In 1879, the Civil Status Registry was created for the registration of births, marriages and deaths, which until then was in charge of the Catholic Church. That year, the existing vicariate in the country was promoted to the Diocese of Montevideo on 13 July 1878 by Pope Leo XIII and Jacinto Vera was appointed as the first bishop of Montevideo.

Isla de Flores served as a lazaretto for thousands of immigrants to complete quarantines before entering the country.

During the Militarism period, the influx of European immigrants that had begun in the aftermath of the Civil War continued at a sustained pace. This large-scale migration contributed to the consolidation of sizable Italian Uruguayan and Spanish Uruguayan communities, which played a significant role in shaping the country’s cultural identity and demographic composition. Within a few decades, Uruguay’s population doubled, while Montevideo’s population tripled, as the majority of newcomers settled in the capital. The share of immigrants increased from 48% of the population in 1860 to 68% in 1868. Throughout the 1870s, a further 100,000 Europeans arrived, bringing the country’s population to approximately 438,000 inhabitants by 1879, with around one quarter residing in Montevideo. Sustained immigration contributed to Uruguay reaching a population of one million inhabitants in the early 20th century.

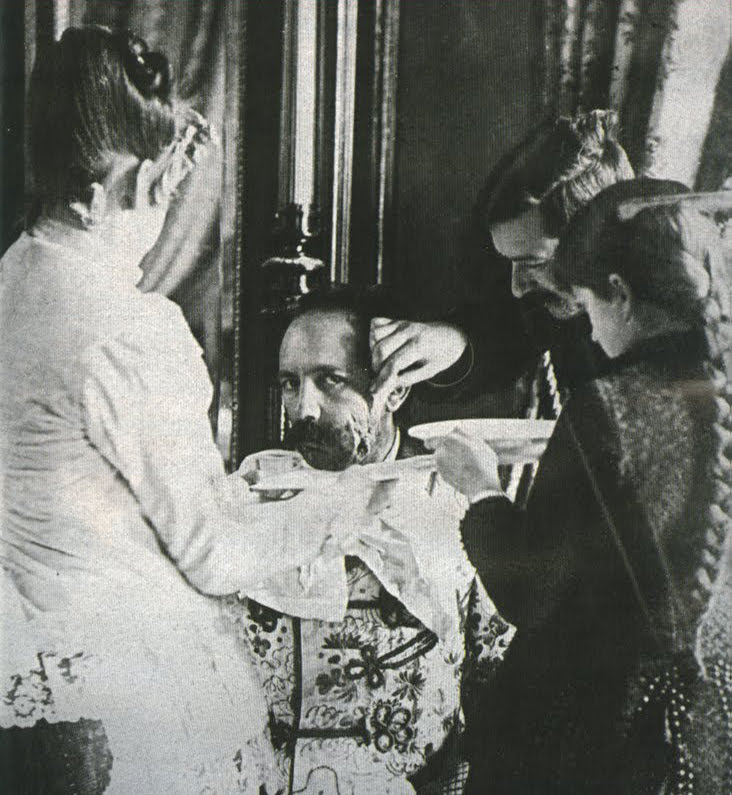
Maximo Santos after assassination attempt

In addition, the economy was stabilized and exports, mainly of Hereford beef and Merino wool, increased. In Fray Bentos corned beef production started. In 1880, Lorenzo Latorre resigned from the presidency, being succeeded by Francisco Antonino Vidal, who finished his term. In 1882 he was succeeded by Máximo Santos. In 1886 the Quebracho Revolution took place, in which revolutionary forces that brought together Blanco and Colorado supporters faced off against the forces of the militarist government. In August 1886, President Santos survived an assassination attempt that led him to leave office.

Máximo Santos was succeeded by General Máximo Tajes, who had led the government forces during the Quebracho Revolution. He carried out an opening policy, which allowed the reorganization of the then existing political parties. Furthermore, during the Tajes administration there was economic prosperity in which the construction of European-style buildings increased in Montevideo, and the gas lighting service was replaced by electric lighting in a large part of the city.

== Return to civil rule and collectivism, 1890–1903 ==
By 1890 the country continued to undergo transformations, with increasing urbanization, mass European immigration, an increase in the educational level due to compulsory education and the development of the middle class. Average living standards had also risen by 1890, with real wages in Uruguay (together with neighboring Argentina) higher than several other European and Latin American countries by that time. In the political sphere, the period that would last until 1903 was characterized by the political predominance of the upper bourgeoisie, to the detriment of the caudillismo that had prevailed for decades.

In 1890, Colorado Julio Herrera y Obes took office as president which marked the end of militarism and the return to civil rule. He proposed the Influencia directriz (Spanish for 'Directive influence'), a political thesis that postulates that the president in office must choose candidates for high elective positions. Thus, collectivism emerged, in which the members of La Colectividad, a sector of the Colorado Party, ensured successive control of the presidency.

In the months after Herrera and Obes took office, the Baring Crisis broke out, greatly affecting the Uruguayan economy. In 1894 Juan Idiarte Borda —a member of La Colectividad— succeeded Herrera y Obes as president. During his administration, the state bank, Banco de la Republica, was established. Due to collectivism, which left state politics in the president's inner circle and ensured the supremacy of the Colorado Party, the National Party was excluded and without representation due to electoral legislation, in addition to denouncing fraud in the 1896 elections.

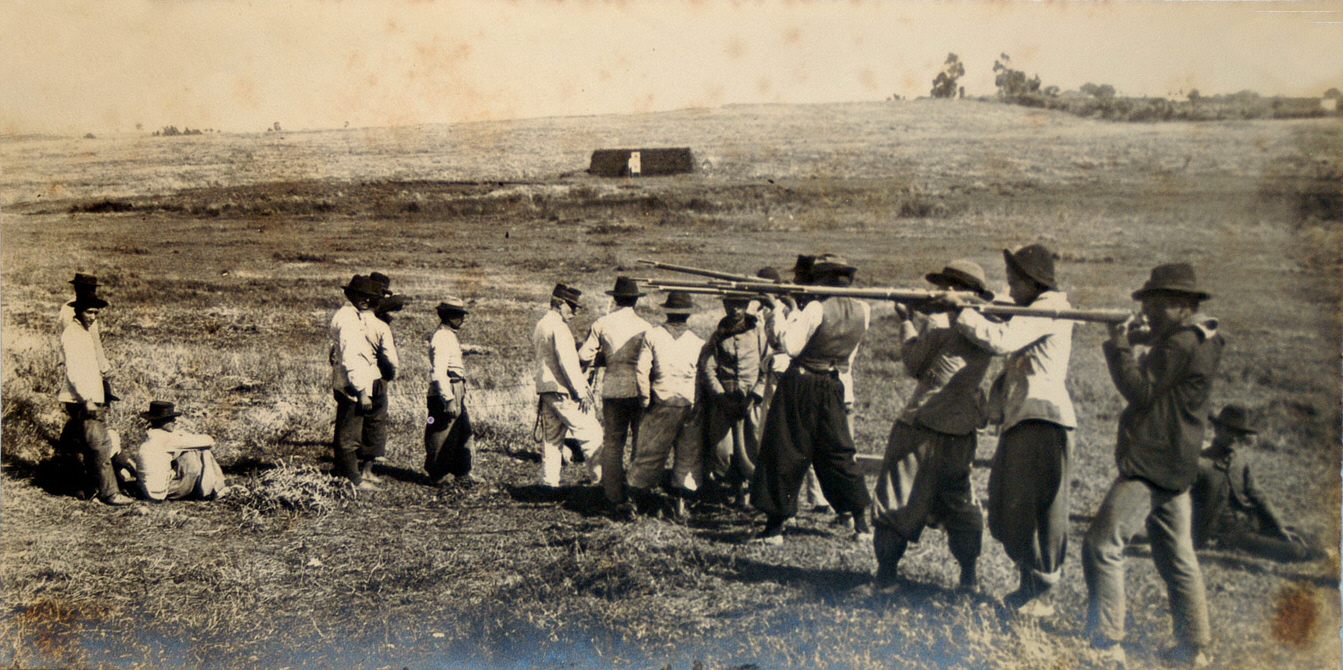
Blanco soldiers during the Revolution of 1897

In March 1897 there was an uprising led by the Blanco caudillo Aparicio Saravia, known as the Revolution of 1897. The confrontation ended with the signing of the Pacto de la Cruz, in which greater political representation and coparticipation was agreed upon. Thus, the governors of the departments of Cerro Largo, Treinta y Tres, Rivera, Maldonado, Flores and San José would be appointed by the Honorable Board, the National Party's central body.

On 25 August 1897, President Juan Idiarte Borda was assassinated while attending Independence Day celebrations. He was succeeded by Juan Lindolfo Cuestas who held the position until 1903.

The cultural and educational development of Uruguayan society in the late nineteenth century contributed to the emergence of the "Generation of 900", an influential group of writers, poets, and intellectuals. Its members included Florencio Sánchez, María Eugenia Vaz Ferreira, Julio Herrera y Reissig, Delmira Agustini and Horacio Quiroga.

== Batlle era, 1903–33 ==
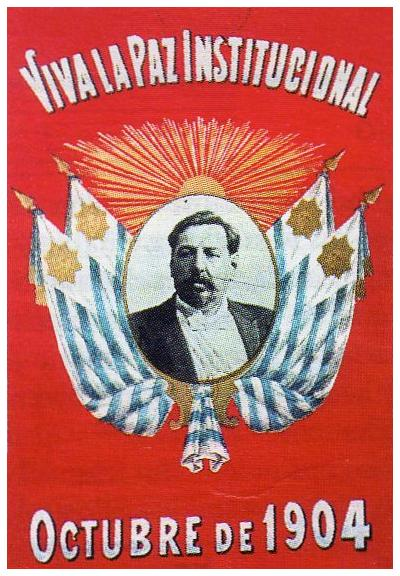
Poster of President Batlle after victory over Blancos in 1904

José Batlle y Ordóñez, President from 1903 to 1907 and again from 1911 to 1915, set the pattern for Uruguay's modern political development and dominated the political scene until his death in 1929. Batlle was opposed to the coparticipation agreement because he considered division of departments among the parties to be undemocratic. The Blancos feared loss of their power if a proportional election system was introduced and started their last revolution in 1904 —led by Aparicio Saravia— which ended with the Colorado victory at the Battle of Masoller.

The Batlle era saw the introduction of various reforms such as new rights for working people, the encouragement of colonization, universal male suffrage, the nationalization of foreign-owned companies, the creation of a modern social welfare system. Under Batlle, the electorate was increased from 46,000 to 188,000. Income tax for lower incomes was abolished in 1905, secondary schools were established in every city (1906), the right of divorce was given to women (1907), and the telephone network was nationalized (1915).

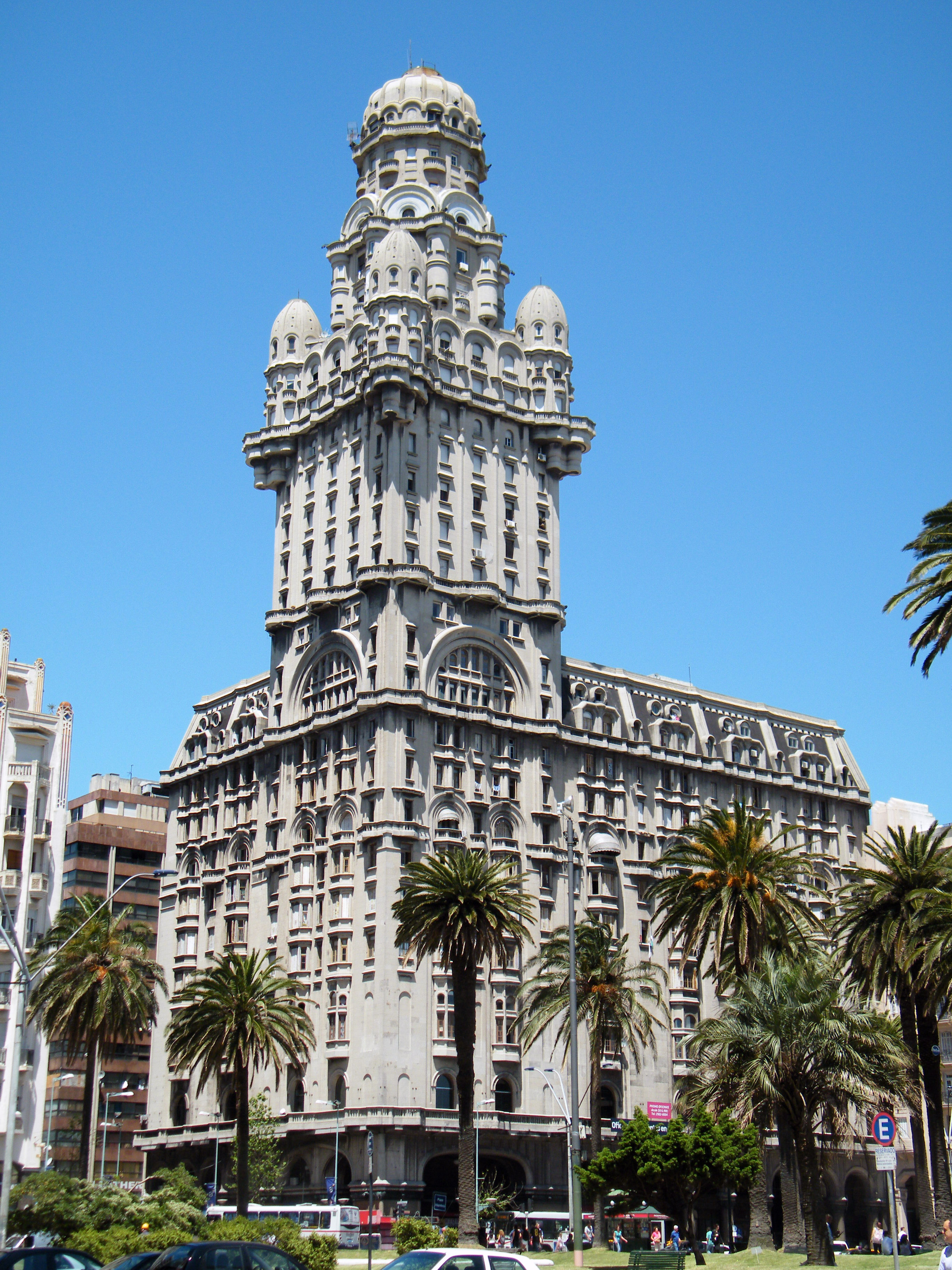
Palacio Salvo, built in Montevideo from 1925 to 1928, was once the tallest building in Latin America.

Severance pay for commercial employees was introduced in 1914, and an eight-hour working day in 1915. In 1918, with the passing of a new constitution, Uruguay proclaimed a secular republic, with the separation of church and state. Loans and seeds were provided to poor farmers, and agricultural colonies were established, while Montevideo also underwent a great deal and social and economic development during these years. Hospitals, maternity homes and research institutes, as well as secondary schools, were built in all the capitals of the departments. Secondary education was integrated into the Secondary and Preparatory Education Section of the University. In addition, a secondary night school was established in 1919 "so that adults who had not finished secondary school could continue their formal education".

The economic policy of Batllism was based on the nationalization of companies, under the idea that certain services should be provided by the State, in search of the common good. With a legal limit of the money destined to acquire the companies, among the nationalizations were the supply of electricity—the National Administration of Power Plants and Electrical Transmissions was created—the insurers and the mortgage loans—the State Insurance Bank and the Banco Hipotecario del Uruguay were established in 1911 and nationalized in 1912, respectively. Furthermore, to compete with the English-administered railways, the construction of roads parallel to the train tracks began, and tram networks were installed in Montevideo, administered by the State.

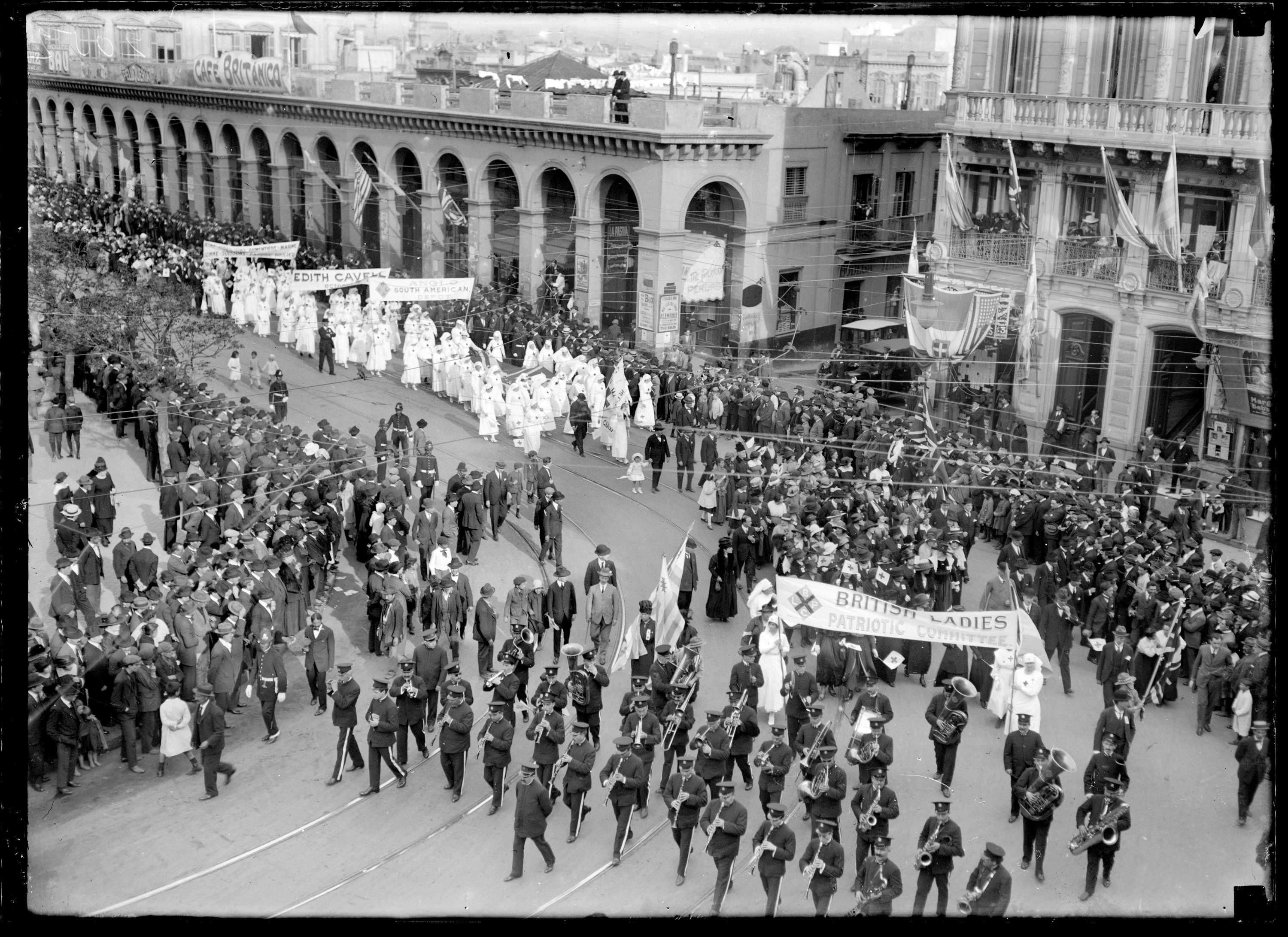
Crowds celebrating the armistice of 11 November 1918 and the end of World War I in Montevideo.

Following the outbreak of World War I, Uruguay adopted a policy of neutrality, severing diplomatic relations with Germany in 1917. During the war, export values rose due to higher international prices, while volumes remained stagnant or below pre-war levels. Export markets temporarily shifted away from Europe toward the United States and other American countries, alongside changes in the composition of exports.

The Constitution of 1918, as a result of political negotiation, established an Executive Branch made up of the President of the Republic and the National Council of Administration, a collegiate body. The president—whose term lasted four years—appointed the holders of the ministerial portfolios of the Interior, Defense and Foreign Relations. The National Council of Administration, on the other hand, appointed those of Finance, Instruction, Labor, Health and Public Works. This collegiate body was elected directly, and was renewed every two years by 1/3 of its members.

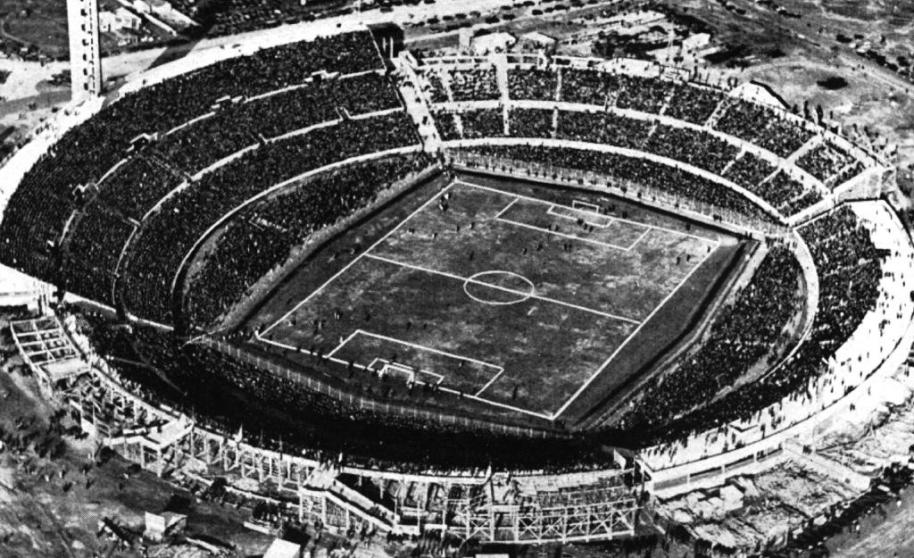
Estadio Centenario, the main stadium of the 1930 FIFA World Cup

Around 1900, infant mortality rates (IMR) in Uruguay were among the world's lowest, indicating a very healthy population. By 1910, however, the IMR leveled off, while it continued to drop in other countries. The leading causes of death—diarrheal and respiratory diseases—did not decline, indicating a growing public health problem.

During the Roaring Twenties, Uruguay experienced a period of economic, demographic, and cultural growth. The country's population reached approximately 1.6 million, while more than 100,000 European immigrants arrived in the years following World War I. Montevideo underwent further urban modernization, with new architectural styles such as Art Deco beginning to emerge. The period also saw the consolidation of mass society, reflected in the growing popularity of tango and other forms of popular entertainment and urban culture. Uruguay's international profile also grew through football, with the national team winning gold medals at the 1924 and 1928 Summer Olympics.

Further social and economic reforms were carried out in the years following Batlle's passing. In 1930, Uruguay hosted and won the first FIFA World Cup. By the end of the 19th century and the first decades of the 20th century, the country managed to consolidate its democracy and welfare state, as well as reach high educational and cultural levels, which is why it began to be known as "The Switzerland of the Americas".

== Gabriel Terra dictatorship, 1933–38 ==
During the 1920s, Uruguayan society and the economy experienced a period of prosperity and modernization. However, the Wall Street crash of 1929 severely affected the country, which remained heavily dependent on foreign trade. At the British Empire Economic Conference, the United Kingdom decided to restrict import volumes from Uruguay, while international meat prices declined sharply. By 1930, the economic downturn had begun to affect the country, resulting in rising unemployment, the depreciation of the Uruguayan peso, and a decline of more than 60% in meatpacking production. The welfare state was severely affected by the economic crisis, which also contributed to an escalating political crisis.

In the 1930 general election, Colorado Party candidate Gabriel Terra was elected president. He took office on 1 March 1931 and soon became critical of the 1918 Constitution, particularly the National Council of Administration, which he argued had contributed to political instability and difficulties in governing. The council’s measures to alleviate the economic crisis, including policies affecting different sectors of society, generated increasing discontent and contributed to its political isolation. The Batllist majority of the Colorado Party and the Independent National Party minority within the council reached an agreement to expand state intervention in the economy. As part of this policy, the state-owned National Administration of Fuels, Alcohol and Portland was established to prevent the loss of foreign currency through the activities of foreign companies.

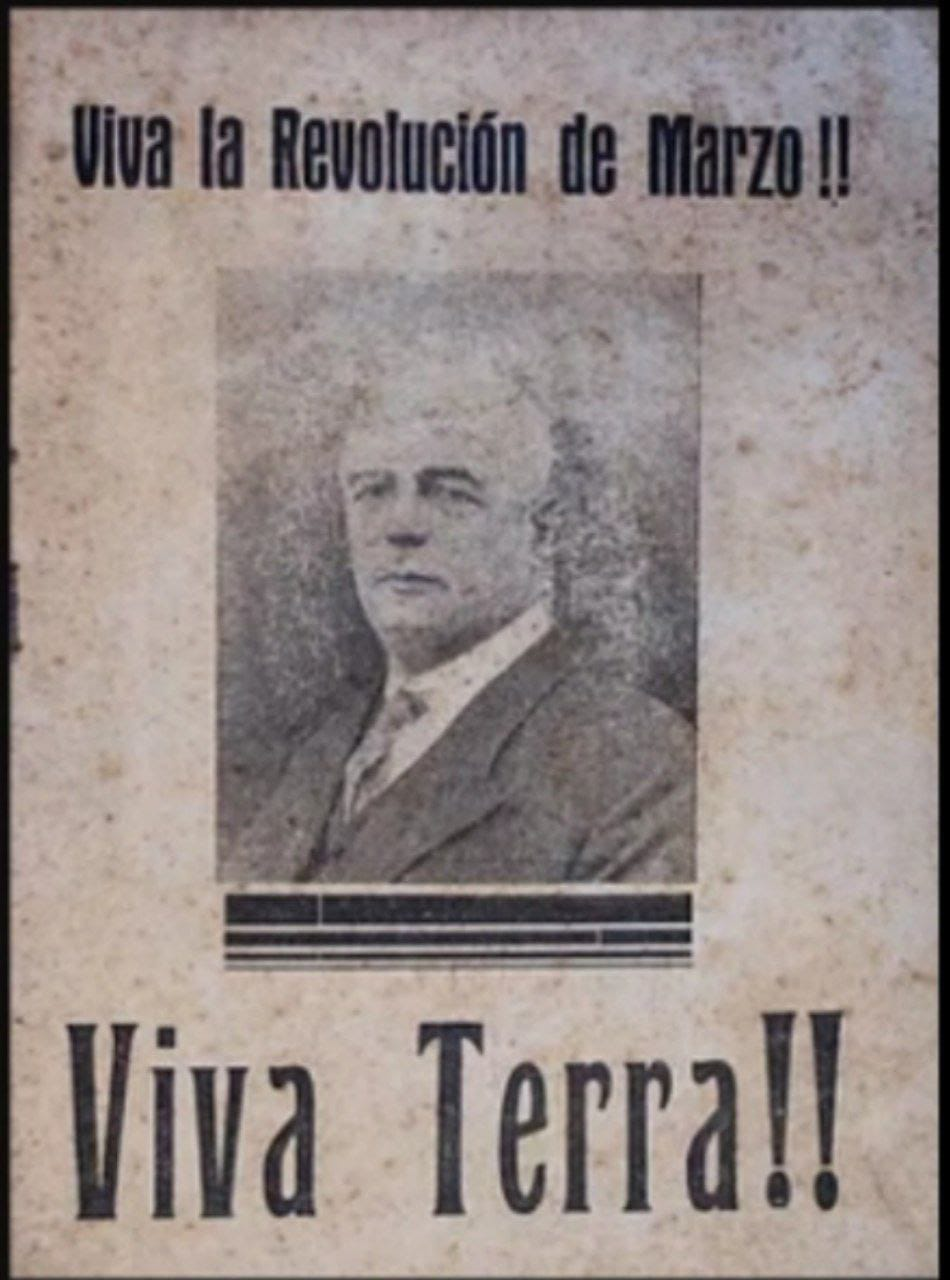
Propaganda of Terra and the March revolution

In rejection of the agreement in the council, the leader of the opposition National Party, Luis Alberto de Herrera joined President Terra in the campaign to carry out a constitutional reform. On 30 March, a manifesto by Colorado Batllista politicians opposed to the constitutional reform bill was published in the El Día newspaper, and in response, Terra decreed some extraordinary measures that were annulled by the General Assembly hours later. On 31 March 1933, with the support of the National Police —led by his brother-in-law Alfredo Baldomir Ferrari— and the Fire Department, Gabriel Terra carried out a coup d'état, by dissolving Parliament and the National Council of Administration. The event was called the Revolución Marzista (Spanish for 'March Revolution') and began the terrista dictatorship.

Terra established a traditionalist, protectionist and cooperative regime. It was characterized by strong nationalism, with the exaltation of national symbols and military parades. In June 1933, elections were held to elect the members of the Constitutional Assembly in charge of drafting a new Constitution. In March 1934, this body appointed him president until 1938. In April a referendum was held in which a new constitution was approved. It abolished the National Council of Administration and transferred its powers to the President, reinstating the single-person executive. In addition, homosexuality was decriminalized, a number of rights were enshrined in the Constitution, and gender equality and women's suffrage were established.

In foreign policy, Terra's regime broke diplomatic relations with the Soviet Union in 1935 and recognized the National Defense Junta of Spain led by Francisco Franco in 1936. It also had close ties with Fascist Italy and Nazi Germany. During his administration, the construction of the Rincón del Bonete hydroelectric dam was ordered to a consortium of German companies, which transferred its own technicians to the country, who settled in a town in the rural area.

Terra was succeeded by his close political follower and brother-in-law General Alfredo Baldomir Ferrari. During this time, state retained large control over nation's economy and commerce, while pursuing free-market policies.

== Dictablanda and new constitution, 1938–47 ==
In the 1938 election, Colorado Alfredo Baldomir Ferrari was elected president. With the end of Terra's dictatorship, numerous social and political sectors were in favor of a new constitutional reform, to which President Baldomir joined.

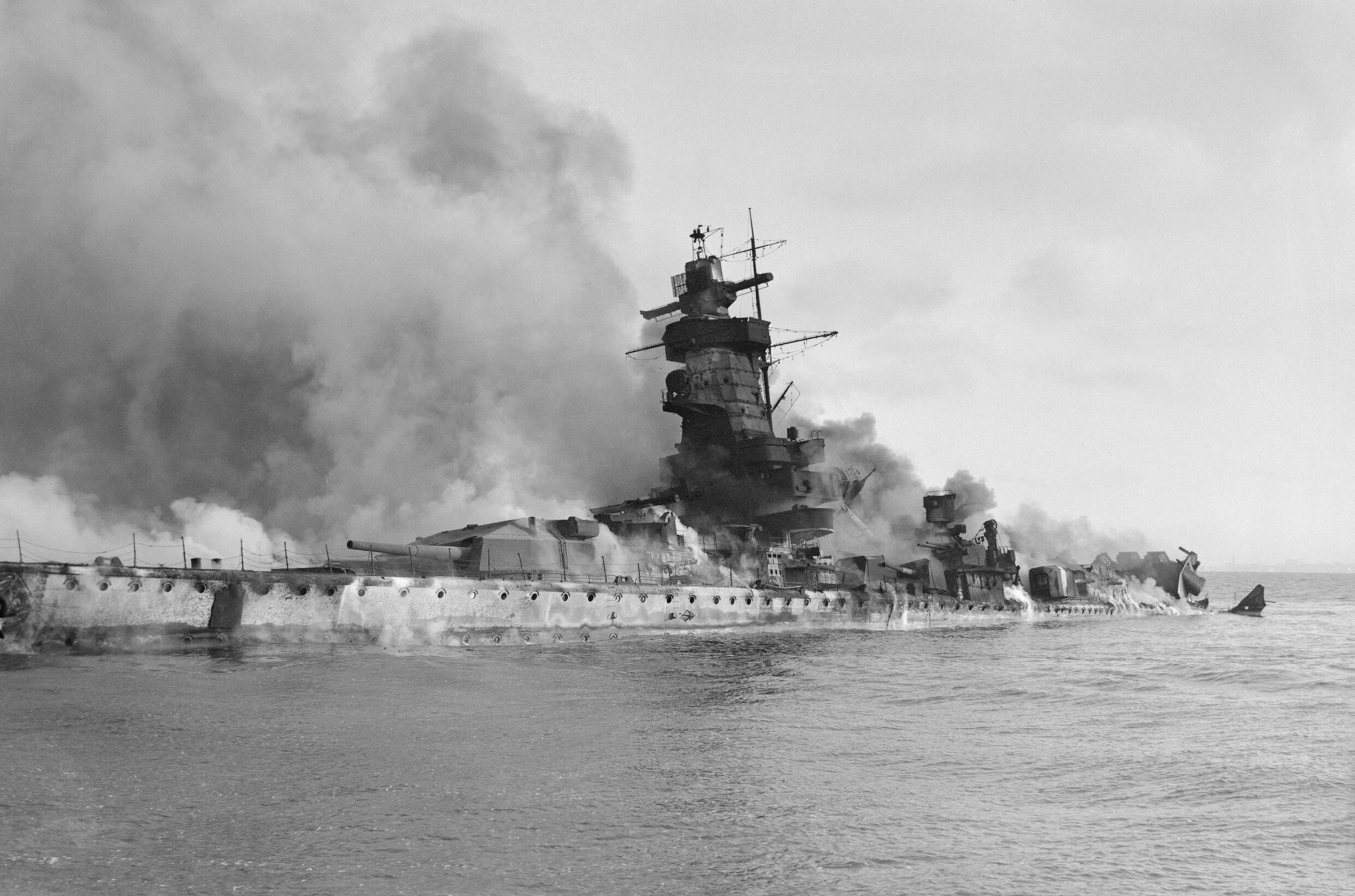
The sinking of the German cruiser Admiral Graf Spee is the best known event of Uruguay during World War II.

With the outbreak of World War II, President Baldomir declared the country's neutrality. However, as the months passed, the Uruguayan government began to take a position in favor of the Allies and US directives, which meant a radical change in foreign policy with respect to that of Gabriel Terra. On 13 December 1939, the Battle of the River Plate was fought a day's sailing northeast of Uruguay between three British cruisers and the German "pocket battleship" Admiral Graf Spee. After a three-day layover in the port of Montevideo, the captain of Admiral Graf Spee, believing he was hopelessly outnumbered, ordered the ship scuttled on 17 December.

With the escalation of the war, a parliamentary commission was established to investigate German and Italian cultural and sports organizations, which were presumed to be used to cover up Nazi-fascist activities infiltrated in the country. In addition, a law was passed classifying as an illicit association any organization that disseminated "ideas contrary to the democratic-republican form of government" and the Armed Forces were organized, establishing mandatory military service due to fears of an invasion.

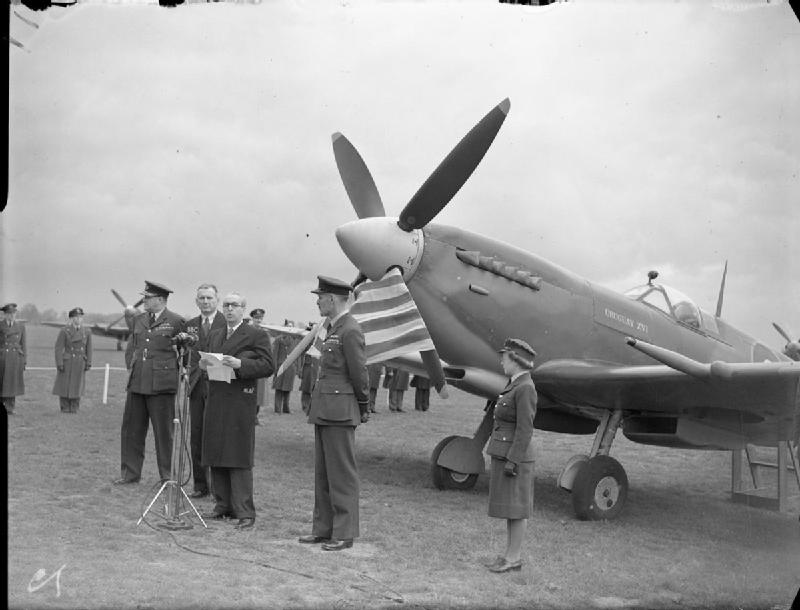
Senor Montero de Bustamante, Uruguayan Chargé d'Affaires in the United Kingdom, speaking at a 1943 ceremony to name a Royal Air Force Spitfire fighter, funded by Uruguayan donations

In June 1940, Germany threatened to break off diplomatic relations with Uruguay. In December, Germany protested that Uruguay gave safe harbor to HMS Carnarvon Castle after she fought the German raider Thor. The ship was repaired with steel plate reportedly salvaged from Admiral Graf Spee.

On 25 January 1942, Uruguay terminated its diplomatic relations with Nazi Germany, as did 21 other Latin American nations. In February 1945, Uruguay signed the Declaration by United Nations and subsequently declared war on the Axis powers but did not participate in any actual fighting.

Simultaneously with the war in Europe, in Uruguay there was a lack of agreement between the factions of the different parties regarding the constitutional reform. The Herrerism sector led by Luis Alberto de Herrera, which had agreed to the 1934 Constitution, was opposed to the reform bill, and after not supporting the president's candidate for speaker of the Chamber of Representatives, Baldomir replaced three Herrerista ministers.

Due to the lack of political agreement, in the early morning of 21 February 1942, President Baldomir carried out a self-coup by dissolving the General Assembly and the Electoral Court. In addition, he announced the call for elections for the last Sunday of November of that year. During the coup there were no arrests, no police repression, no censorship, and no violations of human rights, which is why these events are known as the Golpe Bueno (Spanish for 'Good Coup') and the regime, as dictablanda.

The General Assembly was replaced by a Council of State of 16 members—Colorado Batllistas and Independent Blancos—which was in charge of drafting a new constitutional reform bill. On 29 November 1942, a general election were held in which Colorado Juan José de Amézaga was elected president of the Republic. The Council of State would be dissolved shortly after and replaced by the newly elected parliament. Along with the general election, a constitutional referendum was held, which won by around 77% of the vote, and gave effect to the Constitution of 1942.

== New Batllism era, 1947–58 ==
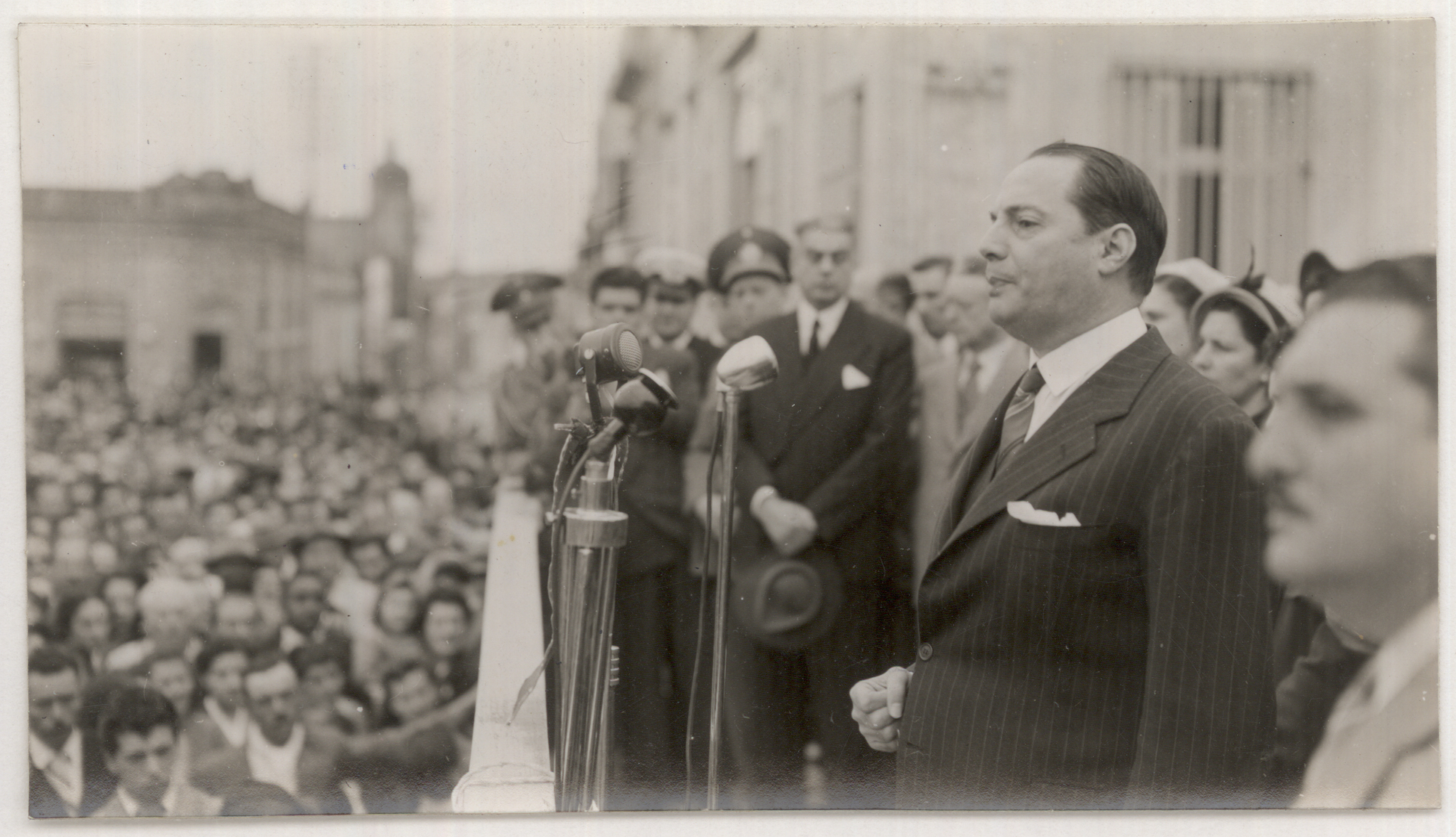
President Batlle Berres during a speech in Minas, 1949

In the 1946 general election, Tomás Berreta succeeded Juan José de Amézaga as president. However, in August 1947, he died suffering from prostate cancer and was succeeded by then vice president Luis Batlle Berres—nephew of José Batlle y Ordóñez—who became the third member of the Batlle family to occupy the presidency of the country.

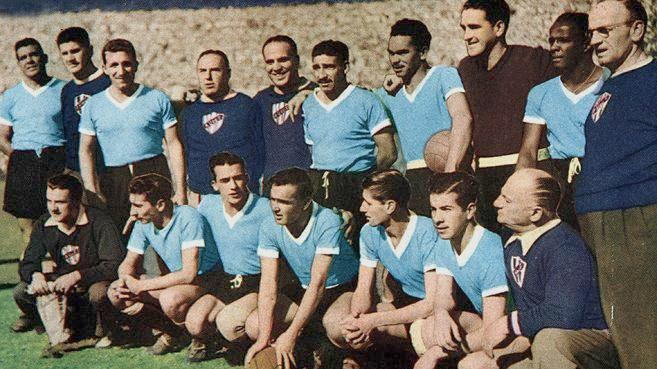
Players of the Uruguay national football team that won the 1950 World Cup after the victory known as Maracanazo

Uruguay reached the peak of its economic prosperity thanks to the World War II and the Korean War. During these conflicts, the country supplied beef, wool, and leather to the Allied armies. In 1949, to cover the British debt for the beef deliveries during WWII, British-owned railroads and water companies were nationalized. Luis Batlle Berres implemented an interventionist and protectionist policy, which in several aspects continued the import substitution policy developed in the 1930s, and the principles of the Batllism welfare state implemented by José Batlle y Ordóñez at the beginning of the century, for which it was called Neobatllismo (Spanish for 'New Batllism').

In the 1950 general election Colorado Andrés Martínez Trueba —who was part of List 15, Batlle Berres' faction— was elected president of the Republic. After taking office he proposed a constitutional reform to reinstate a collegiate executive, which was supported by the leader of the National Party, Luis Alberto de Herrera, who had previously opposed the collegiate system. In 1951, a constitutional referendum was held that approved the 1952 Constitution, which established the National Council of Government. It was made up of six members from the winning party and three from the second party. Its first integration was a majority of the Colorado Party. Martínez Trueba completed his presidential term until 1955 as president of the body.

In 1953, the Uruguayan Air Force was established as a separate branch of the National Army. In the 1954 election, the Colorado Party again obtained a majority in the National Council of Government. In the period 1955–1959, the effects of an economic crisis —caused by the decrease in demand in the world market for agricultural products— worsened and there was an increase in the number of retirees and pensioners, in addition to an increase in the number of public employees, which led to popular discontent with the New Batllism model.

== Blanco collegiate executives era, 1958–66 ==
The National Party won the 1958 election and became the ruling political group in the National Council of Government. The period of government was characterized by constant instability and weakness due to internal conflicts in the National Party between the Herrerism, Ruralism and the White Democratic Union factions—which was aggravated by the death of the party's leader, Luis Alberto de Herrera.

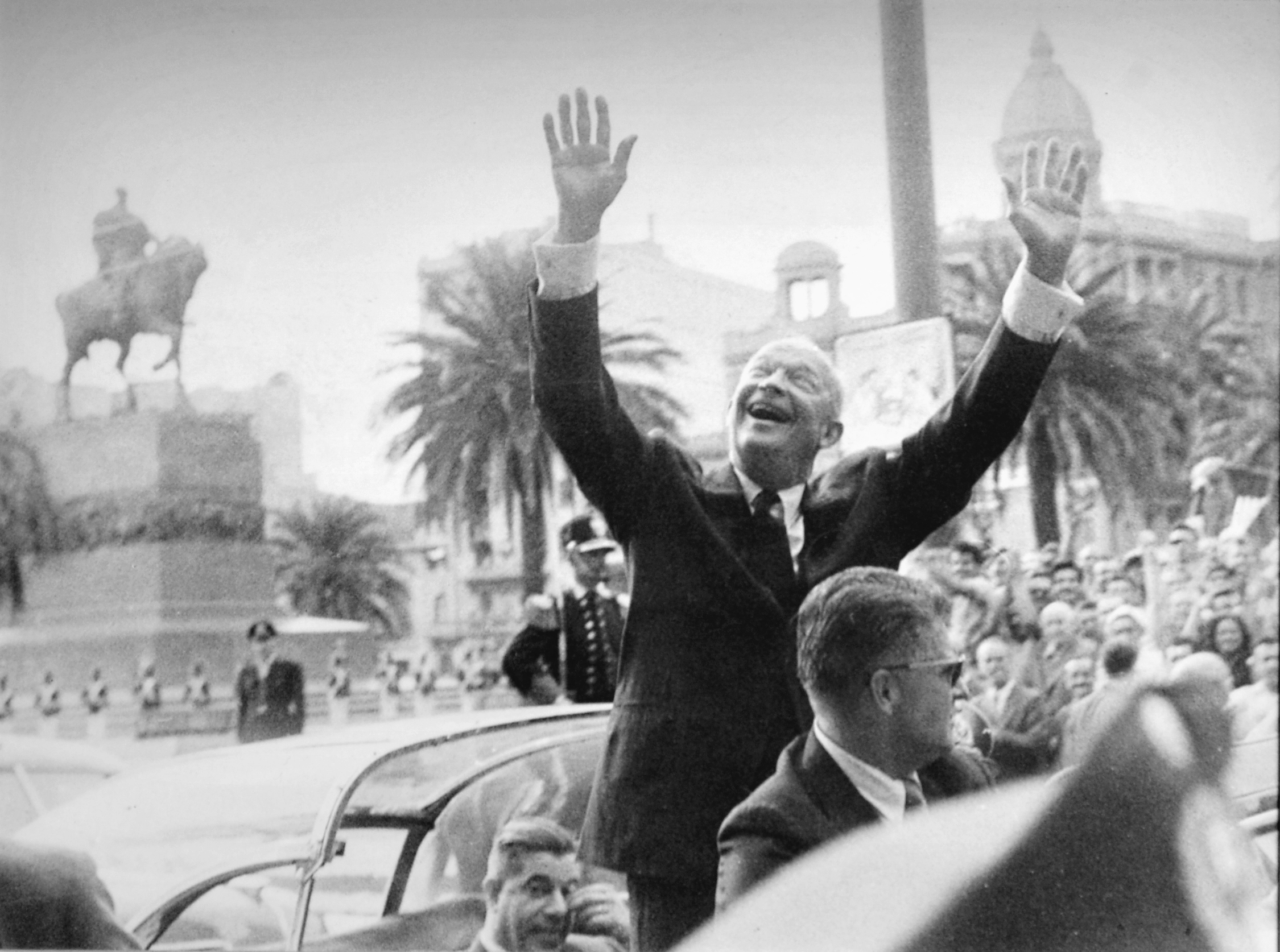
U.S. President Dwight D. Eisenhower in Montevideo, 1960

During the first Blanco collegiate term, a liberal and anti-protectionist economic policy was implemented. In 1959 the country was hit by severe floods, which affected agricultural production and therefore the country's economy. In 1960, a letter of intent was signed with the International Monetary Fund, which sought a loan of 300 million dollars to finance agriculture.

The economic crisis led to student militancy and labor unrest. The collective ruling council was unable to agree on harsh measures that were required to stabilize the economy. As the demand for Uruguay's export products plummeted, the collective leadership tried to avoid budget cuts by spending Uruguay's currency reserves and then began taking foreign loans. The Uruguayan peso was devalued, and inflation increased greatly.

In the 1962 election, the National Party once again had the most votes, thus obtaining again a majority in the National Council of Government.

== Growing instability, 1966–73 ==
In the early 1960s, social discontent due to the economic crisis that had worsened and union agitation increased, which led to the implementation of Medidas Prontas de Seguridad (Spanish for 'Prompt Security Measures'), which are powers established by the Uruguayan Constitution that enable the Government to temporarily suspend certain constitutional guarantees in the event of serious and unforeseen cases of external attack or internal commotion. Additionally, the far-left guerrilla group National Liberation Movement – Tupamaros (MLN-T), emerged and commenced operations involving weapons theft, bombings targeting government officials and military officers, and kidnappings.

In the 1966 election, Óscar Diego Gestido was elected president, which meant the return of the Colorado Party to the Estévez Palace. A constitutional referendum removed the National Council of Government and replaced it with a one-man executive under the new Constitution of 1967. In December 1967, President Gestido died without completing the first year of his term. He was succeeded by then vice president Jorge Pacheco Areco, who ordered the banning of the Socialist Party, the Oriental Revolutionary Movement, the Uruguayan Anarchist Federation and the Revolutionary Left Movement, and the closure of the newspapers El Sol and Época, arguing that these groups and media outlets were members of the Latin American Solidarity Organization, which defended the revolution to rise to power.

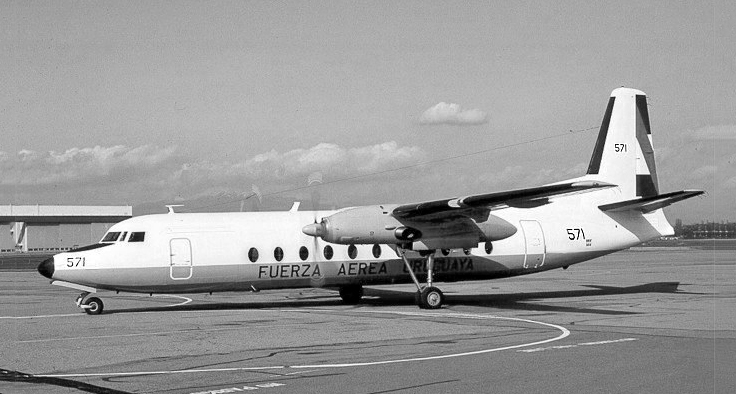
Replica of the Uruguayan Air Force plane that crashed on 13 October 1972, with 45 Uruguayans on board and gave rise to the so-called miracle of the Andes

During the presidency of Pacheco Areco, student mobilization became widespread, in August 1968 during a demonstration against raids on university centers, the student Líber Arce was killed by police forces. In June, President Pacheco Areco had implemented Medidas Prontas de Seguridad (Spanish for 'Prompt Security Measures'). Additionally, the activity of the far-left guerrilla group Tupamaros (MLN-T) intensified, led by Raúl Sendic Antonaccio, who, years earlier, had organized the sugarcane workers' marches from Bella Unión to Montevideo. In the early 1970s, the group began carrying out more assassinations and kidnappings, including that of the British ambassador to Uruguay, Geoffrey Jackson, and Dan Mitrione, a CIA agent who collaborated with the National Police.

In September 1971, two months before the general election, 106 prisoners belonging to Tupamaros (MLN-T) escaped from the penitentiary of the Punta Carretas neighborhood of Montevideo. The government entrusted the Armed Forces with the anti-subversive fight, which involved the intervention of commanders in political affairs. In November, a general election was held, in which Colorado Juan María Bordaberry was elected president.

Amid the ongoing armed struggle and political violence of the MLN-T, on April 15, 1972, the General Assembly declared a 'state of internal war,' marking the beginning of the Uruguayan intrastate war. This led to a widespread crackdown by the armed forces against guerrilla groups. At the same time, the economic situation deteriorated as a result of high inflation, contributing to a resurgence of labor mobilization. The MLN-T continued to carry out attacks against military and police personnel, including an incident on 18 May (Army Day), in which four soldiers aged between 21 and 27, who were on guard duty, were killed.

Following a series of military operations, a large number of members of the MLN-T were arrested. In early September, the last remaining MLN-T leader at large, Raúl Sendic Antonaccio, was captured. Despite this, the influence of the top military commanders in national politics continued to grow.

== Military dictatorship, 1973–1985 ==
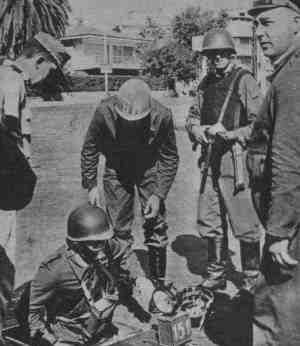
Police inspection the sewers in Montevideo, which were used by MLN-T members to move around the city.

On 9 February 1973, the commanders of the Army and the Air Force announced that they would not comply with the orders of the newly appointed Minister of National Defense, Antonio Francese. Meanwhile, the commander of the National Navy, Juan José Zorrilla, opposed the Army and Air Force and declared his support for the government. He ordered the blocking of access to Montevideo’s Ciudad Vieja and deployed warships off the city’s coast; however, he resigned shortly thereafter when several officers refused to recognize his authority.

Three days later, President Juan María Bordaberry met with the commanders at the Cap. Juan Manuel Boiso Lanza Air Base, where he accepted their demands—including the replacement of Francese by Walter Ravenna as Minister of National Defense—in what became known as the “Boiso Lanza Agreement”. This led to an expansion of military influence in public administration through the creation of the National Security Council (COSENA), in which the armed forces and the executive branch would act jointly on most matters of national governance. These events later became known as the Febrero amargo (Spanish for 'Bitter February') of 1973.

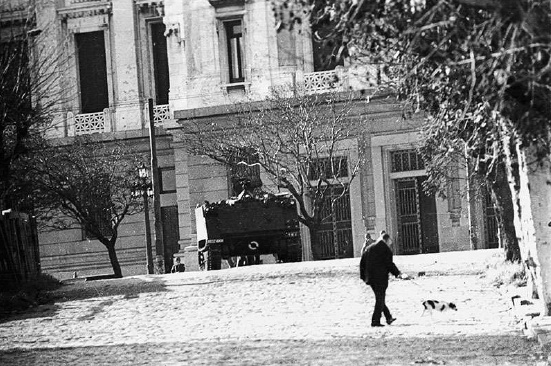
Army tank outside the Legislative Palace on the day of the coup

On 27 June 1973, President Bordaberry, with the support of the commanders of the armed forces, dissolved the Chamber of Senators and the Chamber of Representatives and established a Council of State with legislative and administrative oversight functions, as well as the mandate to “draft a constitutional reform reaffirming republican-democratic principles”, thereby carrying out a coup d’état.

In response to the coup, Vice President Jorge Sapelli and several ministers resigned in protest, while the National Convention of Workers (CNT) called a general strike, which involved the occupation of factories and buildings of the University of the Republic and became the longest general strike in the country's history, lasting fifteen days. On 9 July, a march protesting the coup was held along 18 de Julio Avenue, organized by political parties and trade unions, and proceeded from Plaza de Cagancha to Plaza Independencia.

The civic–military dictatorship—so termed because it retained civilian presidents and some civilian authorities within state institutions, albeit with the armed forces exercising effective control over key areas of government decision-making—formed part of Operation Condor, a coordinated campaign among the dictatorships of the Southern Cone involving intelligence cooperation, security operations, and political repression.

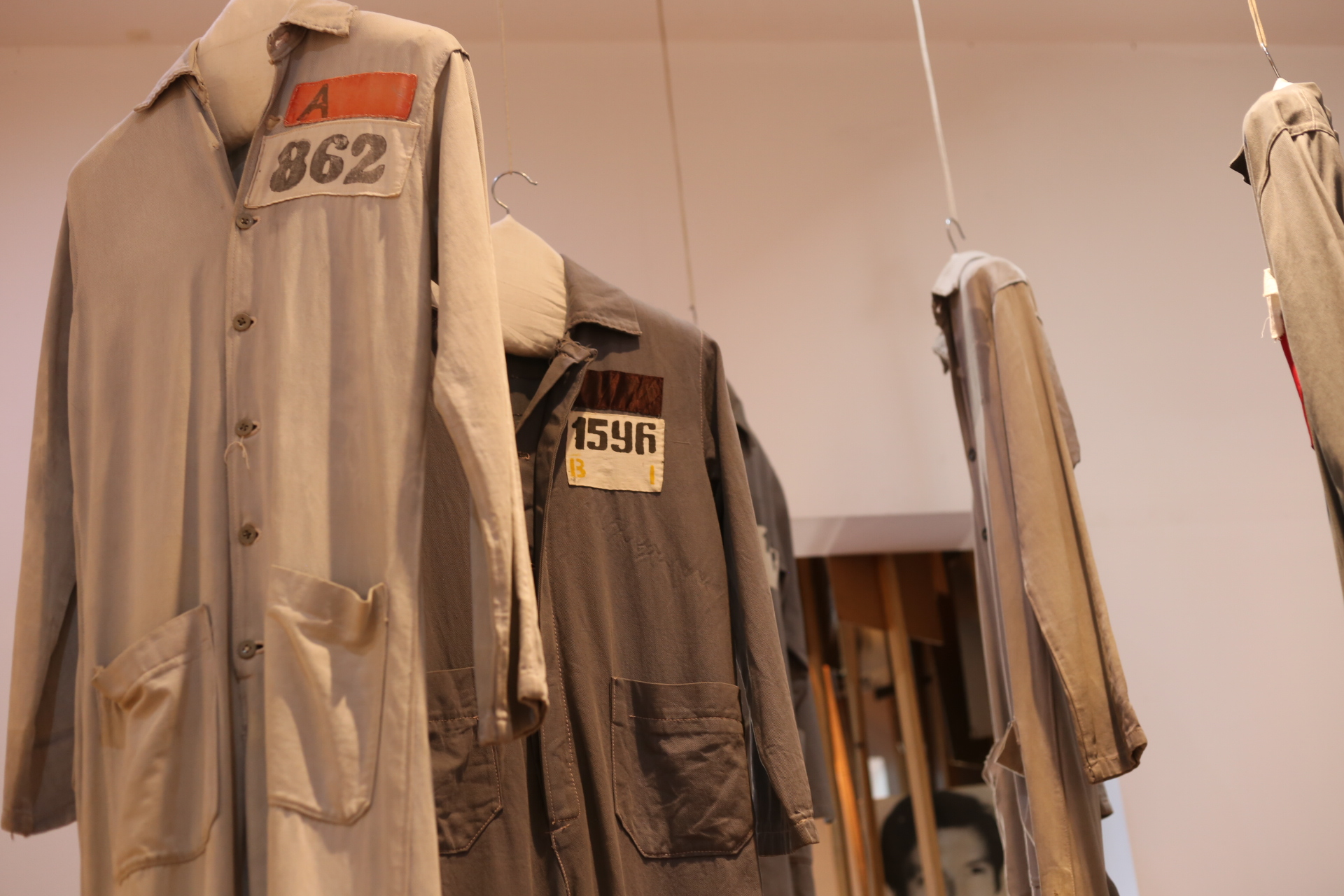
Garments worn by prisoners during the dictatorship, exhibited at the Museum of Memory

Bordaberry was removed from office by the armed forces in 1976 and was succeeded by Alberto Demicheli, who served as president for a brief period before being replaced by Aparicio Méndez, who was appointed by a Council of State selected by the military authorities. In an attempt to institutionalize the regime, the armed forces proposed a new constitution in 1980, which was submitted to a national referendum. The proposal was rejected, with 57.2% of voters voting against it. The rejection was followed by a period of increasing political and economic difficulties that contributed to the weakening of the regime.

In 1981, General Gregorio Álvarez assumed the presidency. In 1982 primary elections in the political parties were held and in 1983 there began to be greater dialogue between the military junta and the political authorities. In November, after the negotiations were canceled due to lack of agreement, a massive demonstration was held at the Obelisk of the Constituents in Montevideo, to demand a democratic transition. From July to August 1984, talks were held that led to the Naval Club Pact, in which the path to the return to civil rule was outlined.

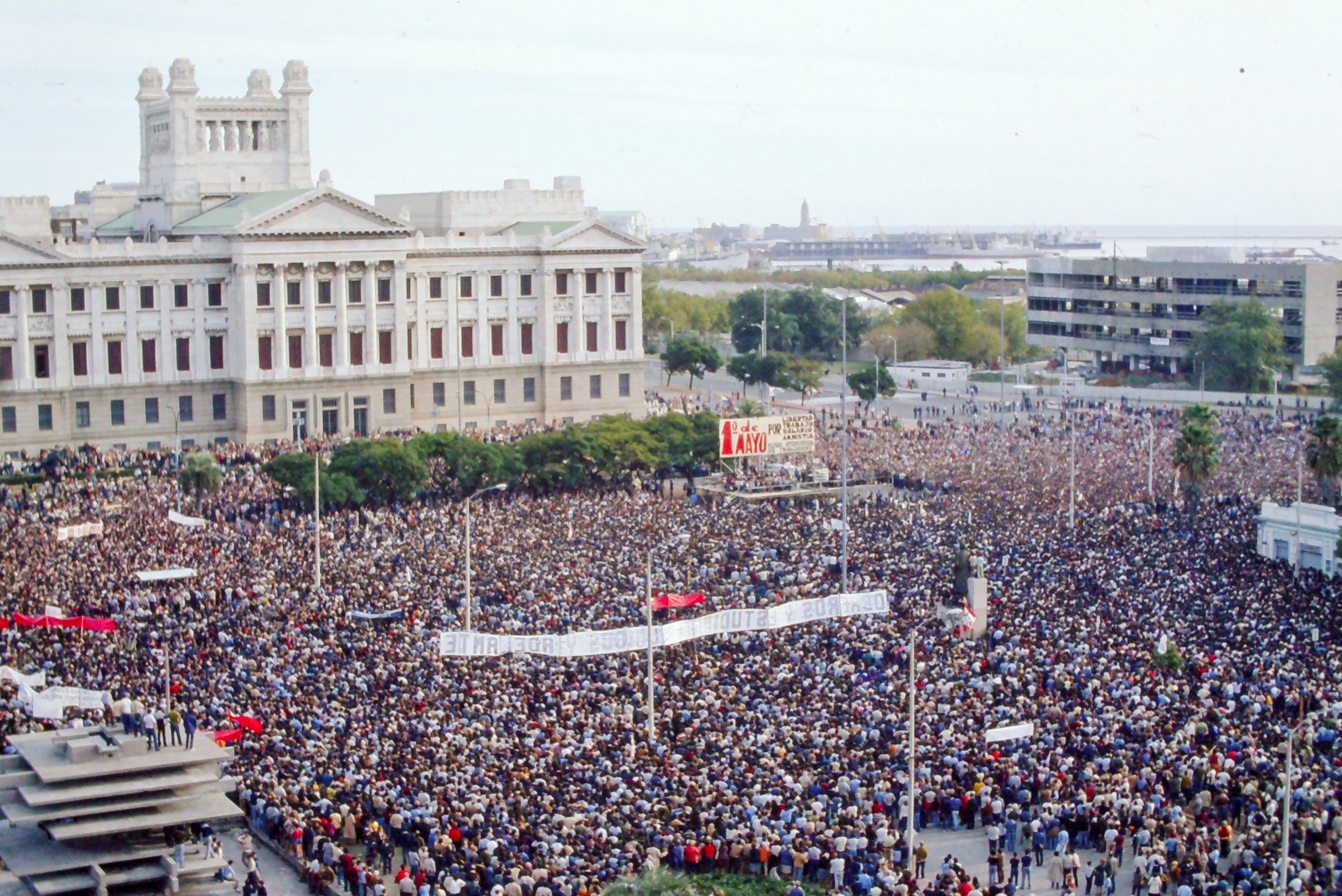
International Workers' Day rally in 1983

A general election was held later in 1984. Colorado Party leader Julio María Sanguinetti won the presidency and, following the brief interim Presidency of Rafael Addiego Bruno, served from 1985 to 1990. On 8 March 1985, an amnesty law was enacted, providing for the release of individuals detained for political reasons or related offenses. The measure also extended to members of the MLN-T who had participated in left-wing insurgent activities prior to the 1973 coup. A separate law authorized the reinstatement of public servants who had been dismissed on ideological grounds, allowing them to recover their positions and administrative careers. On 11 April, the National Repatriation Commission was established, facilitating the return of approximately 16,000 emigrants through employment programs and job-training initiatives.

Around 180 Uruguayans are known to have been killed during the 12-year military rule from 1973 to 1985. Most were killed in Argentina and other neighboring countries, with only 36 of them having been killed in Uruguay. A large number of those killed were never found, and the missing people have been referred to as the "disappeared", or "desaparecidos" in Spanish.

== Recent history, 1986–present ==
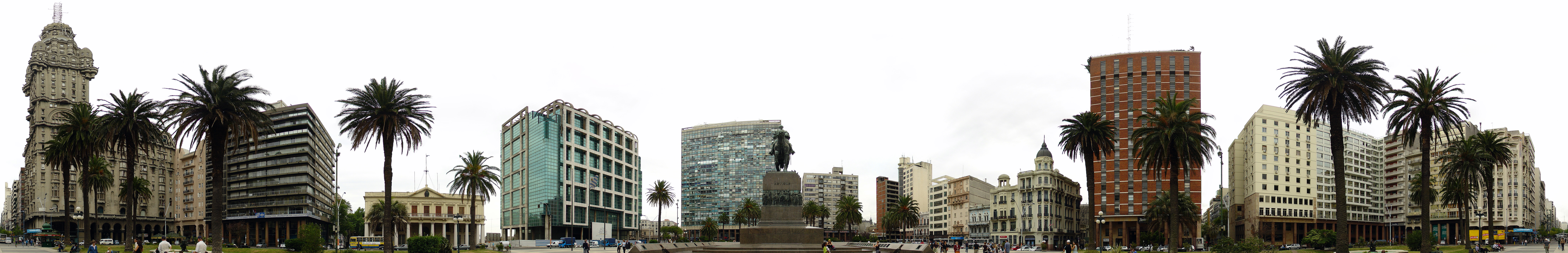
Modern Central Montevideo

=== First Sanguinetti administration (1985–1990) ===
In December 1986, the Law on the Expiration of the Punitive Claims of the State was approved. This legislation effectively granted amnesty to police and military personnel for crimes committed during the period of military rule. In 1989, a referendum was held in which the law was upheld by voters.

Sanguinetti's economic reforms, focusing on the attraction of foreign trade and capital, achieved some success and stabilized the economy. In order to promote national reconciliation and facilitate the return of democratic civilian rule, Sanguinetti secured public approval by plebiscite of a controversial general amnesty for military leaders accused of committing human rights violations under the military regime and sped the release of former guerrillas.

=== Lacalle administration (1990–1995) ===
The National Party's Luis Alberto Lacalle won the 1989 presidential election and served from 1990 to 1995. President Lacalle executed major economic structural reforms and pursued further liberalization of trade regimes, including Uruguay's inclusion in the Southern Common Market (MERCOSUR) in 1991. Despite economic growth during Lacalle's term, adjustment and privatization efforts provoked political opposition, and some reforms were overturned by referendum.

On 24 August 1994, a demonstration organized mainly by left-wing political groups against the extradition to Spain of three Spanish citizens of Basque origin accused of belonging to the Euskadi Ta Askatasuna (ETA) separatist organization took place in Montevideo. Violent unrest and clashes between protesters and police broke out in the Jacinto Vera neighborhood, particularly around Hospital Filtro, where the three individuals were being treated after beginning a hunger strike. The events resulted in two deaths and hundreds of injuries and have been regarded as the most serious episode of street violence and confrontation with police in Uruguay since the restoration of democracy in 1985.

=== Second Sanguinetti administration (1995–2000) ===
In the 1994 elections, former President Sanguinetti won a new term, which ran from 1995 until March 2000. As no single party had a majority in the General Assembly, the National Party joined with Sanguinetti's Colorado Party in a coalition government. The Sanguinetti government continued Uruguay's economic reforms and integration into MERCOSUR. Other important reforms were aimed at improving the electoral system, social security, education, and public safety. The economy grew steadily for most of Sanguinetti's term until low commodity prices and economic difficulties in its main export markets caused a recession in 1999, which continued into 2002.

=== Batlle administration (2000–2005) ===
The 1999 national elections were held under a new electoral system established by a 1996 constitutional amendment. Primaries in April decided single presidential candidates for each party, and national elections on 31 October determined representation in the legislature. As no presidential candidate received a majority in the October election, a runoff was held in November. In the runoff, Colorado Party candidate Jorge Batlle, aided by the support of the National Party, defeated Broad Front candidate Tabaré Vázquez.

The Colorado and National Parties continued their legislative coalition, as neither party by itself won as many seats as the 40 percent of each house won by the Broad Front coalition. The formal coalition ended in November 2002, when the Blancos withdrew their ministers from the cabinet, although the Blancos continued to support the Colorados on most issues.

Batlle's five-year term was marked by economic recession and uncertainty, first with the 1999 devaluation of the Brazilian real, then with the outbreaks of foot-and-mouth disease (aftosa) in Uruguay's key beef sector in 2001, and finally with the political and economic collapse of Argentina. Unemployment rose to close to 20 percent, real wages fell, the peso was devalued, and the percentage of Uruguayans in poverty reached almost 40 percent.

These worsening economic conditions played a part in turning public opinion against the free market economic policies adopted by the Batlle administration and its predecessors, leading to popular rejection through plebiscites of proposals for privatization of the state petroleum company in 2003 and of the state water company in 2004.

In 1989, elections were held in Montevideo which saw the candidate of the Broad Front, Tabaré Vázquez, elected mayor of Montevideo. Vasquez would go on to hold the post of mayor from 1990 to 1994. The victory of the Broad Front was arguably the result of long-standing social problems, with one observer noting

The combination of economic crisis, military dictatorship and neoliberal policies had led to a drop in living standards and social equality as well as a decrease in social spending and urban services. The social safety net that had once made Uruguay a model welfare state was badly frayed, and government, from garbage collection to mass transport, no longer worked well. Added to these traumas was the trial of dealing with a municipal bureaucracy notorious for its arrogance and inefficiency. Paying one's taxes or filling out a forin could take hours; securing services from the centralized municipal government could take years. The Frente Amplio promised to tackle these problems, creating a municipal government that was efficient, efficacious and responsive, services that were modern and affordable, and a city whose financial burdens and economic benefits were more equitably distributed. The political subtext was clear. If the Frente Amplio could turn Montevideo around in so dramatic a fashion, it would be in a position to mount a serious challenge for national power, and Vázquez would become a credible presidential candidate.

During the time the Broad Front governed Montevideo, a range of social initiatives were carried out. New street lights were installed, while housing construction was promoted by giving municipal lands to communities (as noted by one study) "for cooperative self-built residential housing, and by funding the rental of construction machinery and contributing materials at low prices which are repaid through long-term loans from the public Banco Hipotecario or foreign non-governmental organizations (NGOs)". More land titles were given to squatters than any previous administration, and a construction-materials "bank" was established to help people improve their housing. Public-vaccination plans were also expanded and an eye-care and clinic plan was initiated, though not fully implemented, while distribution of subsidized milk was tripled and free milk provided for institutional daytime snacks. In addition, the burden of subsidizing students and the elderly from other bus riders through higher fares was shifted to the municipality through direct subsidies to the bus companies.

=== First Vázquez administration (2005–2010) ===
In 2004, Uruguayans elected Tabaré Vázquez as president, while giving the Broad Front coalition a majority in both houses of parliament. The newly elected government, while pledging to continue payments on Uruguay's external debt, also promised to undertake a crash jobs programs to attack the widespread problems of poverty and unemployment.

=== Mujica administration (2010–2015) ===
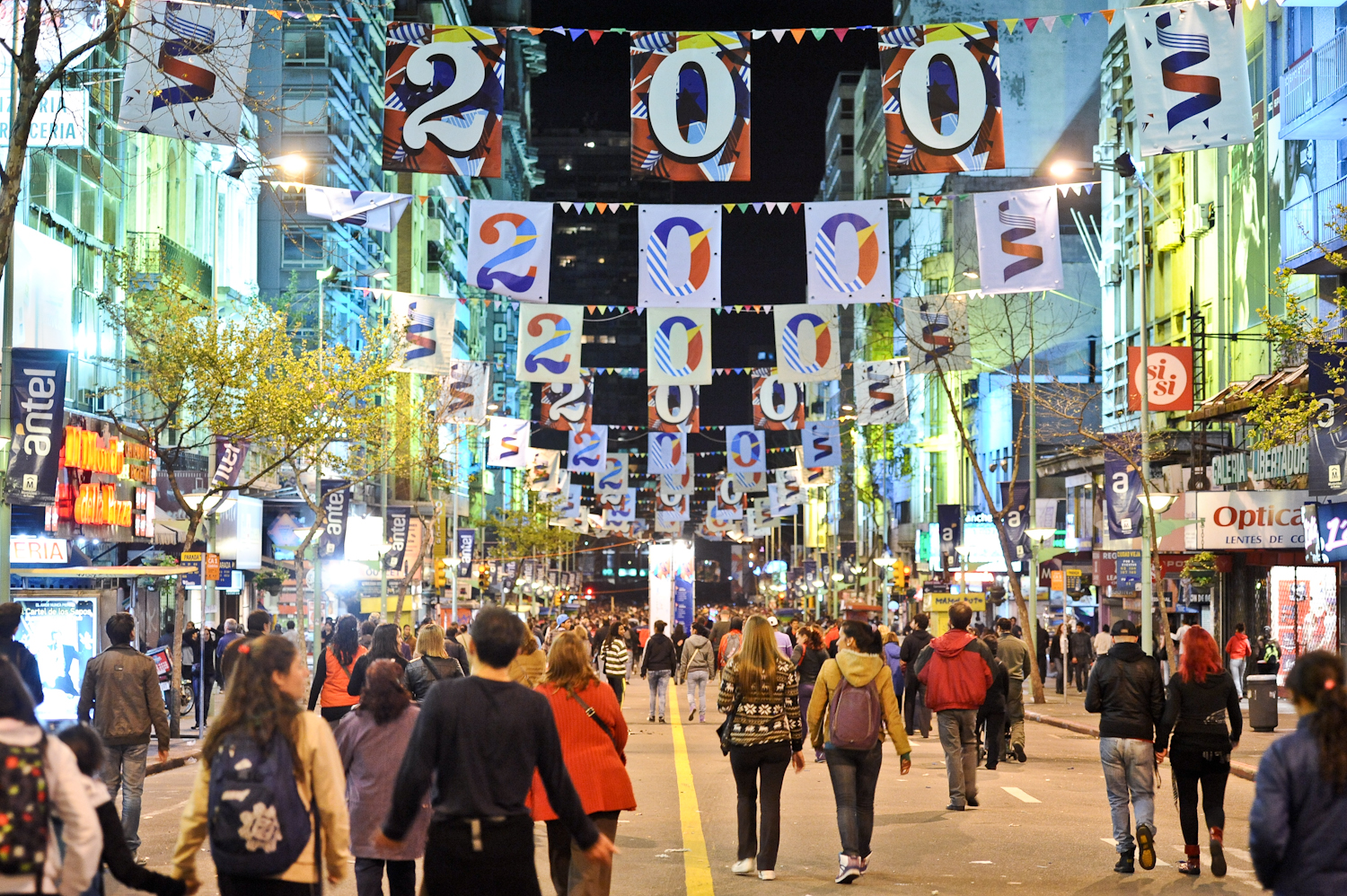
2011 bicentennial celebrations in Montevideo

In 2009, former Tupamaro and agriculture minister, José Mujica, was elected president, subsequently succeeding Vázquez on 1 March 2010. Abortion was legalized in 2012, followed by same-sex marriage and cannabis in the following year. A number of other reforms were carried out during the Broad Front's time in office in areas like social security, taxation, education, housing, tobacco control, and worker's rights.

The number of trade union activists has quadrupled since 2003, from 110,000 to over 400,000 in 2015 for a working population of 1.5 million people. According to the International Trade Union Confederation, Uruguay has become the most advanced country in the Americas in terms of respect for "fundamental labour rights, in particular freedom of association, the right to collective bargaining and the right to strike".

=== Second Vázquez administration (2015–2020) ===
In November 2014, former president Tabaré Vázquez defeated center-right opposition candidate Luis Lacalle Pou in the presidential election. On 1 March 2015, Tabaré Vázquez was sworn in as the new President of Uruguay to succeed president José Mujica.

On 15 April 2016, an F3 tornado struck the city of Dolores, in the southwestern Soriano Department. The storm caused five deaths and widespread urban damage as it crossed the city from one end to the other.

=== Lacalle Pou administration (2020–2025) ===
In November 2019, Luis Lacalle Pou won the presidential election, bringing an end to 15 years of Broad Front rule. He was sworn in on 1 March 2020, marking the National Party’s return to power 30 years after his father assumed the presidency in 1990. Beatriz Argimón, meanwhile, became the first woman elected as vice president.

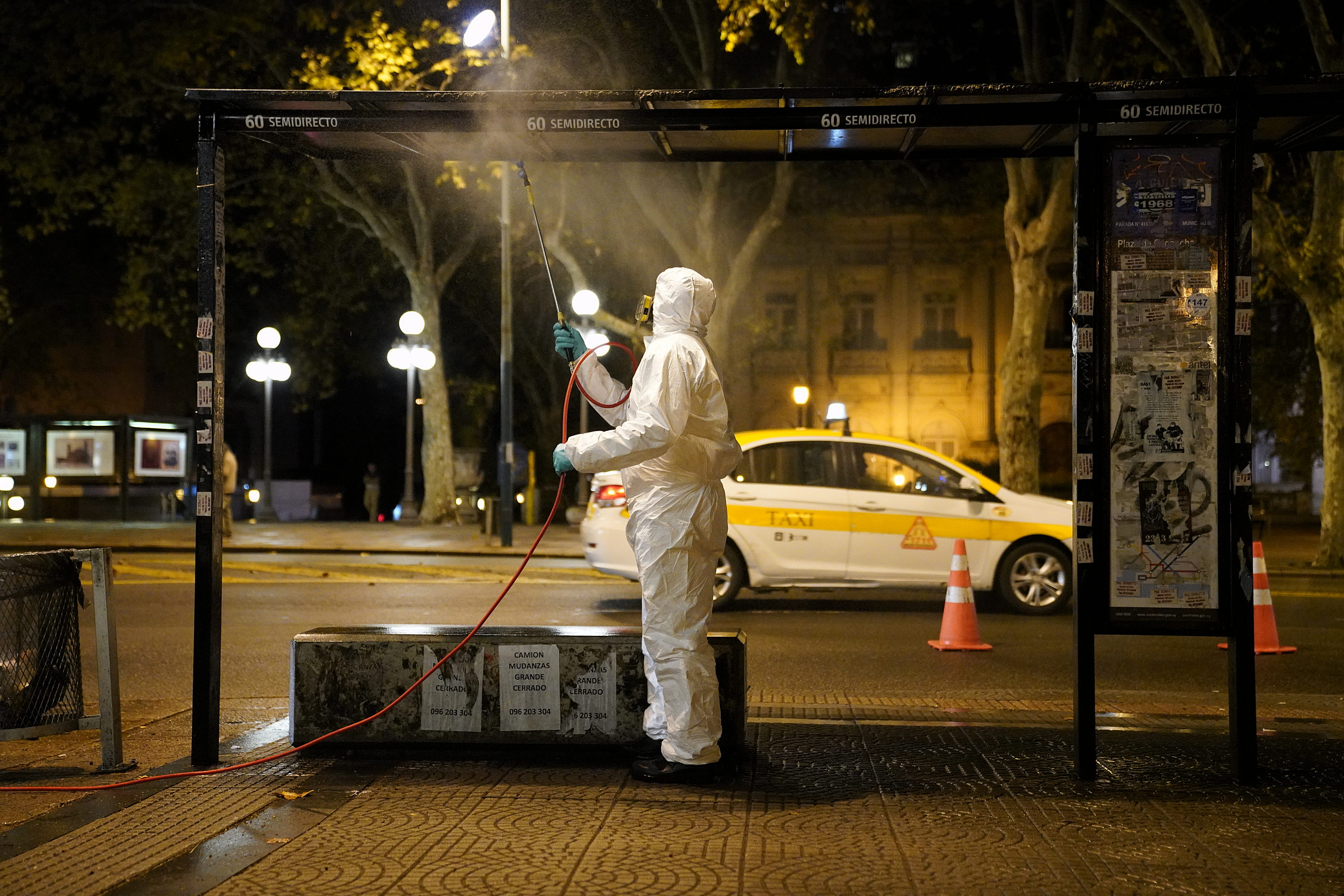
Worker disinfecting public spaces in central Montevideo during the COVID-19 pandemic.

In March 2020, COVID-19 began to spread in Uruguay. The government’s response was based on a policy of “responsible freedom”, avoiding mandatory lockdowns while declaring a state of health emergency. During 2020, no major waves of infection were recorded; however, in 2021, several outbreaks led to a significant increase in cases and deaths. By February 2022, more than 690,000 cases and over 6,000 deaths had been reported. Vaccination against the disease began in March 2021, and within a short period Uruguay became one of the countries with the highest vaccination rates in the world. The health emergency was lifted in April 2022.

From late 2022 through the first half of 2023, Uruguay was affected by a severe drought attributed to the La Niña phenomenon. The event led to higher temperatures and reduced rainfall, becoming the country’s most significant drought in decades. In June 2023, a “water emergency” was declared in the Montevideo metropolitan area due to declining reserves in the reservoir supplying the region. As a result, in order to maintain the public water supply, the state water company OSE began pumping water from a section of the Santa Lucía River near the Río de la Plata, where salinity levels are higher, leading to an increase in sodium levels in the drinking water. By August, the drought had subsided, and reservoir levels and water supply conditions returned to normal.

=== Orsi administration (2025–present) ===
On 1 March 2025, Yamandu Orsi took office as Uruguay's new president, meaning the left-wing coalition, the Broad Front, returned to power after a five-year interruption.

== See also ==
- History of Argentina
- History of Brazil
- List of presidents of Uruguay
- List of Uruguayan historians
- Instituto Histórico y Geográfico del Uruguay
- Politics of Uruguay
- Portuguese colonization of the Americas
- Spanish colonization of the Americas

== Bibliography ==
- Arteaga, Juan José (2018). Historia Contemporánea del Uruguay (in Spanish). Montevideo: Ediciones Cruz del Sur. ISBN 9789974675926.
- Burford, Tim (January 2014). Uruguay. The Bradt Travel Guide (2nd ed.). Chalfont St Peter, Bucks: Bradt Travel Guides Ltd. ISBN 978-1-84162-477-8.
- Cameselle-Pesce, Pedro; Sharnak, Debbie, eds. (2024). Uruguay in transnational perspective. Routledge studies in the history of the Americas. New York: Routledge. ISBN 978-1-000-91526-6.
- Cameselle-Pesce, Pedro; Sharnak, Debbie, eds. (2024) Uruguay in Transnational Perspective (Routledge, 2024) scholarly online book review
- Duyne Barenstein, Jennifer; Pfister, Michael (2019). "The Professionalization of a Social Movement: Housing Cooperatives in Uruguay". Built Environment. 45 (3): 382–397. doi:10.2148/benv.45.3.382. S2CID 202304777.
- Finch, M. H. J. (1981). A Political Economy of Uruguay since 1870. London: Macmillan. ISBN 978-03126-22442.
- Frega, Ana; Rodríguez Ayçaguer, Ana María; Ruiz, Esther; Porrini, Rodolfo; Islas, Adriana; Bonfanti, Daniele; Broquetas, Magdalena; Cuadro, Inés (2010). Historia del Uruguay en el siglo XX (1890-2005) (in Spanish) (3rd ed.). Montevideo: Ediciones de la Banda Oriental. ISBN 9789974104921.
- Giménez Rodríguez, Alejandro (2004). El libro de los presidentes uruguayos: de Fructuoso Rivera a Jorge Batlle (1830-2004) (in Spanish). Montevideo: Linardi y Risso. ISBN 9974559480.
- Goebel, Michael (August 2010). "Gauchos, Gringos and Gallegos: The Assimilation of Italian and Spanish Immigrants in the Making of Modern Uruguay (1880–1930)". Past and Present (208). Oxford University Press: 191–229. doi:10.1093/pastj/gtp037.
- Jermyn, Leslie (1999). Cultures of the World – Uruguay. Tarrytown, New York: Marshall Cavendish. ISBN 0-7614-0873-8.
- Lessa, Alfonso (1996). Estado de guerra (in Spanish). Montevideo: Editorial Fin de Siglo. ISBN 9789915678412.
- López-Alves, Fernando (1994). Why Not Corporatism? Re-democratisation and Regime Formation in Uruguay. Berkeley and Los Angeles: University of California Press. pp. 187–206.
- López-Alves, Fernando; Rock, David (May 2000). "State-Building and Political Systems in Nineteenth-Century Argentina and Uruguay". Past and Present (167). Oxford University Press: 176–202.
- Rico, Álvaro; Demasi, Carlos; Wschebor, Isabel; Radakovich, Rosario; Sanguinetti, Vanessa (2005). 15 días que estremecieron al Uruguay: Golpe de Estado y huelga general : 27 de junio - 11 de julio de 1973 (in Spanish). Montevideo: Editorial Fin de Siglo. ISBN 9974493382.
- Scheina, Robert L. (2003). Latin America's Wars (Volume 1): The Age of the Caudillo, 1791–1899. Dulles, Virginia: Potomac Books, Inc. ISBN 978-1-57488-450-0.
- Weinstein, Martin (1975). Uruguay: The Politics of Failure. Santa Barbara, California: Praeger Publishing. ISBN 978-08371-78455.
