= Silvia Rodríguez Villamil =

Uruguayan historian, writer, and activist (1939–2003)

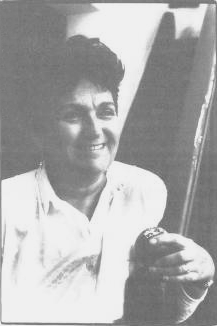
Silvia Rodriguez Villamil

Silvia Rodríguez Villamil (1939 - August 17, 2003) was an Uruguayan historian, feminist, writer, as well as a political and social activist.

== Biography ==
Silvia Rodríguez Villamil was born in Montevideo, 1939. In 1968, she published through Ediciones de la Banda Oriental, her book Las mentalidades dominantes en Montevideo (1850-1900) : La mentalidad criolla tradicional. This work represented an important contribution to the study of the mentality and idiosyncrasy of Uruguay, which had begun to be explored by Carlos Real de Azúa in El patriciado uruguayo (1961) and was continued by the work of José Pedro Barrán and Benjamín Nahum. A second volume by the author dedicated to "The urban and Europeanized mentality" was included in a posthumous reissue by the same publisher in 2008.

Around 1983, together with other feminists such as Graciela Sapriza, she founded the Grupo de Estudios sobre la Condición de la Mujer en el Uruguay (GRECMU) (Study Group on the Status of Women in Uruguay), which published several relevant books on this subject, such as El voto femenino en el Uruguay : conquista o concesión? (1984), Nosotras en la historia (1988), Mujeres militantes y conciencia de género (1990), and Situación y problemática de la mujer uruguaya actual (1991).

Rodriguez died August 17, 2003.

== Selected works ==
- Las mentalidades dominantes en Montevideo (1850-1900) : La mentalidad criolla tradicional (Ediciones de la Banda Oriental, 1968)
- La inmigración europea en el Uruguay (1982)
- Mujer, Estado y política en el Uruguay del siglo XX (1984)
- El voto femenino en el Uruguay : conquista o concesión? (1984)
- Nosotras en la historia (1988)
- Mujeres militantes y conciencia de género (1990)
- Situación y problemática de la mujer uruguaya actual (1991)
- La antesala del siglo XX (1890-1910) (en coautoría con Susana Antola. 2006)
- Las mentalidades dominantes en Montevideo (1850-1900) (Ediciones de la Banda Oriental, 2008)
