= Graciela Sapriza =

Uruguayan historian, educator (*1945)

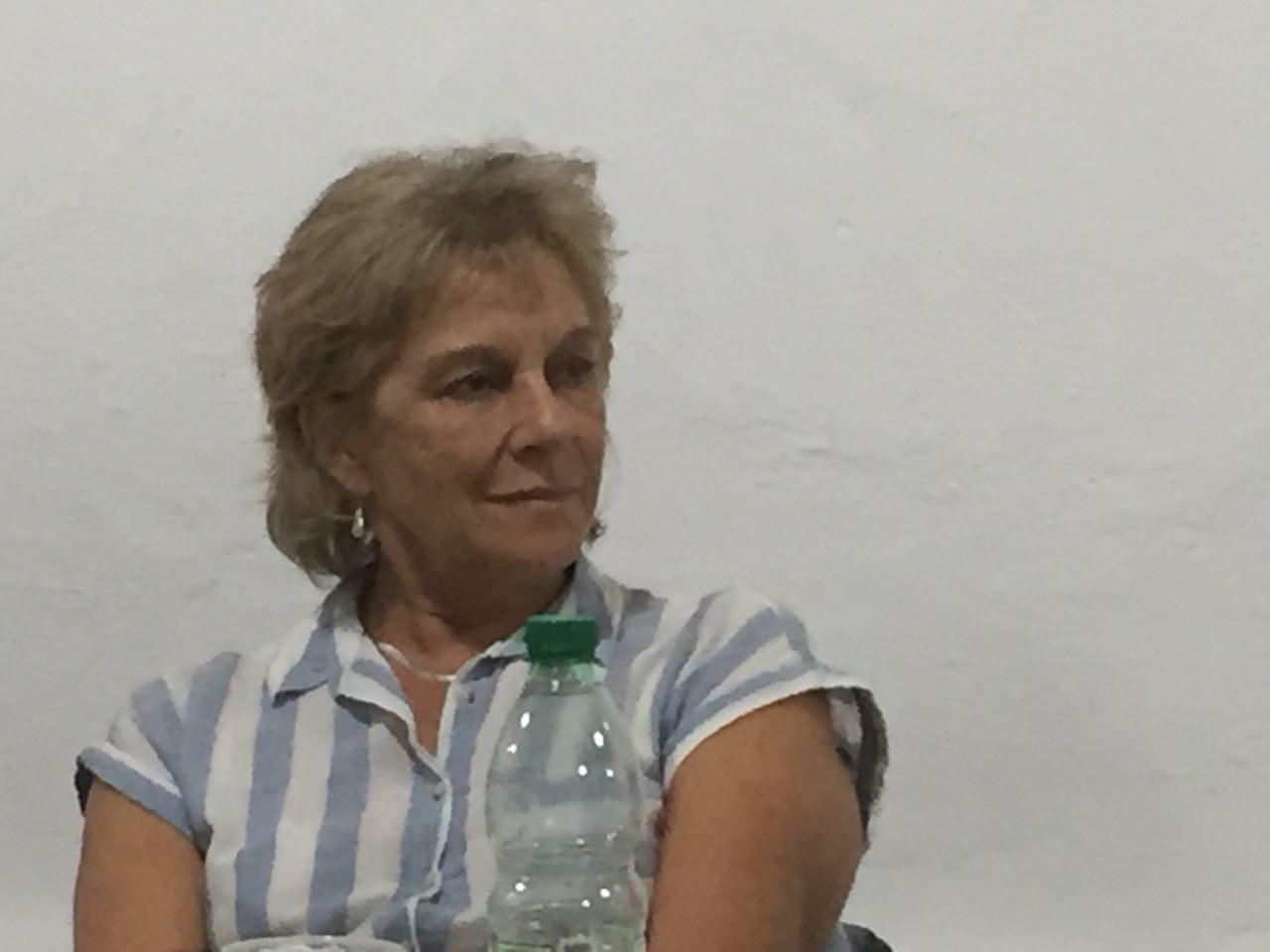
Graciela Sapriza (2019)

Graciela Sapriza (born September 12, 1945) is a Uruguayan historian and educator. Her research focuses on the social, political and cultural participation of Uruguayan women in the 19th and 20th centuries.

== Biography ==
Graciela María Sapriza Torres was born in Montevideo, September 12, 1945. In 1974, she obtained a Bachelor's Degree in Historical Sciences with a minor in Research from the University of the Republic of Uruguay. At the same institution, she obtained her Master's Degree in Human Sciences with a minor in Latin American Studies in 2002. Her thesis was titled "The eugenic utopia: race, sex and gender in population policies in Uruguay (1920-1945)".

During her career, she has served as a teacher at institutions such as the University of the Republic of Uruguay, the University of Valle in Cali, Colombia, the University of Málaga in Málaga, Spain, the University of Gothenburg in Gothenburg, Sweden and the University of Chile in Santiago, Chile, among others. Since the 1980s, she has published a large number of books, articles published in scientific journals, and newspaper texts. Her areas of research focus on the participation of women in social, cultural and political life in Uruguay and in the Río de la Plata region in the 19th and 20th centuries, with a particular emphasis on the memory of the civic-military dictatorship from a gender perspective.

== Selected works ==
- El tiempo quieto. Mujeres privadas de libertad en Uruguay. 2016
- Otra historia. Memorias de resistencia. Mujeres de Las Piedras 1968-1985. 2015
- Genero y sexualidad en el Uruguay. 2001
- Los caminos de una ilusión- 1913: Huelga de mujeres en Juan Lacaze. 1993
- Mujer y poder. En los márgenes de la democracia uruguaya. 1991
- Hilamos una historia. 1989
- Memorias de rebeldía- Siete historias de vida. 1988
- Mujer, Estado y Política en el Uruguay del siglo XX. 1984
- La inmigración europea en el Uruguay- Los Italianos. 1983
