= Daniel Castellanos Arteaga =

Uruguayan politician (1882–1968)

Uruguayan Ambassador to Spain
- In office 1930–1939
- President: Juan Campisteguy
- Preceded by: Benjamín Fernández y Medina
- Succeeded by: Enrique Buero

Uruguayan Ambassador to the United Kingdom
- In office 1939–1942
- President: Alfredo Baldomir
- Preceded by: Alberto Guani
- Succeeded by: Roberto Eduardo MacEachen

Uruguayan Minister of Foreign Affairs
- In office 31 December 1947 – 12 August 1949
- President: Luis Batlle Berres
- Preceded by: Mateo Marques Castro
- Succeeded by: César Charlone Rodríguez

Uruguayan Minister of Foreign Affairs
- In office 1 March 1952 – 22 April 1952
- President: Luis Batlle Berres
- Preceded by: Alberto Domínguez Cámpora
- Succeeded by: Fructuoso Pittaluga

Personal details
- Born: December 21, 1882 Montevideo
- Died: January 1, 1968 (aged 85)
- Relations: his brother was Carlos Alberto Castellanos (Montevideo, January 28, 1881 - October 26, 1945), an Uruguayan painter.
- Parent(s): Lucia Arteaga and José María Castellanos
- Education: In 1907 he graduated from the University of Montevideo.

Daniel Castellanos Arteaga was a Uruguayan politician Foreign Minister, diplomat and writer.

== Life ==
- In 1909 he was a member of the Uruguayan Committee on Primary Education
- From 1911 to 1915 he was secretary in the council for the protection of the offenders and adolescents
- From 1915 to 1927 he was Attorney of the waterworks of Montevideo
- From 1916 to 1928 he was professor of history at the University of Montevideo
- From 1927 to 1930 he was secretary of Juan Campisteguy
- From 1930 to 1939 he was Minister plenipotentiary in Madrid with accreditation in Lisbon.
- From 1939 to 1942 he was Minister plenipotentiary in London
- In 1942 he was assigned to the Senate of Uruguay.
- From October 4, 1945 to March 1, 1947, he was Minister of Public Education and Social Security in a government cabinet of Juan José de Amézaga.
- Within the Colorado Party (Uruguay) he was assigned to the Blancoacevedista wing, which was named after Eduardo Blanco Acevedo.
- From 1948 to 1952 he was twice Minister of Foreign Affairs in the Cabinet of Luis Batlle Berres.
- In 2017, some of his belongings were auctioned in Montevideo, including a historic bell from El Escorial.
