= Uruguay during World War II =

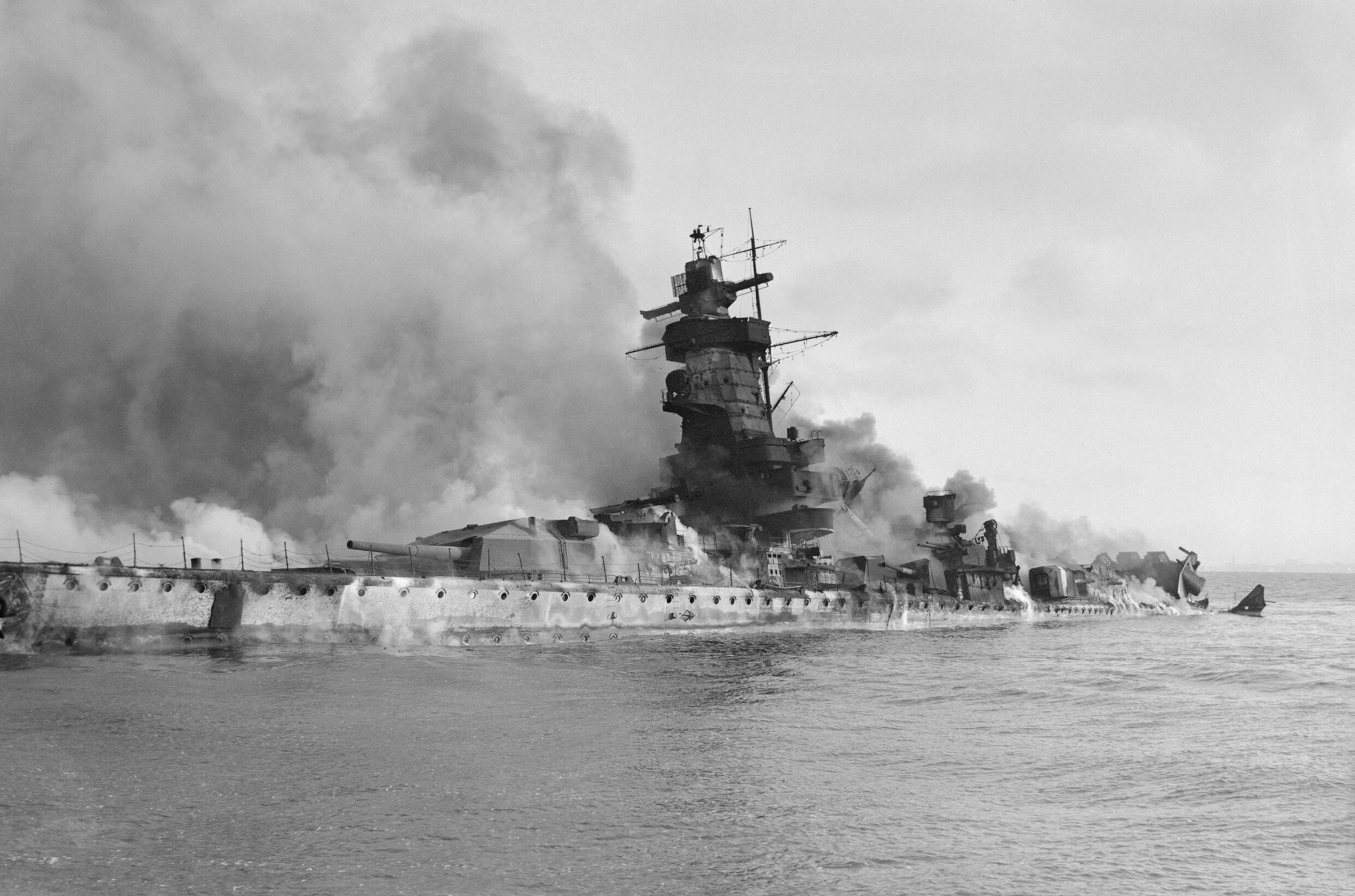
The sinking of the German cruiser Admiral Graf Spee is the best known event of Uruguay during World War II.

Uruguay remained neutral for most of World War II, although it maintained a generally pro-Allied stance. The country's involvement was limited to diplomatic actions, with no official military engagement, although some Uruguayan citizens participated individually on both sides of the conflict. The Battle of the River Plate, fought between British and German forces off the Uruguayan coast, was the only battle of the war to take place in South America.

During the early years of the war, the United Kingdom retained considerable influence over the Uruguayan government, largely through the efforts of Sir Eugen Millington-Drake, who served as British Minister in Montevideo from 1934 to 1941. In January 1942, Uruguay severed diplomatic relations with the Axis powers, and in February 1945 it declared war on Germany and Japan, subsequently signing the Declaration by United Nations.

== Pre-war political and economic background, 1933–38 ==
=== Terra dictatorship ===
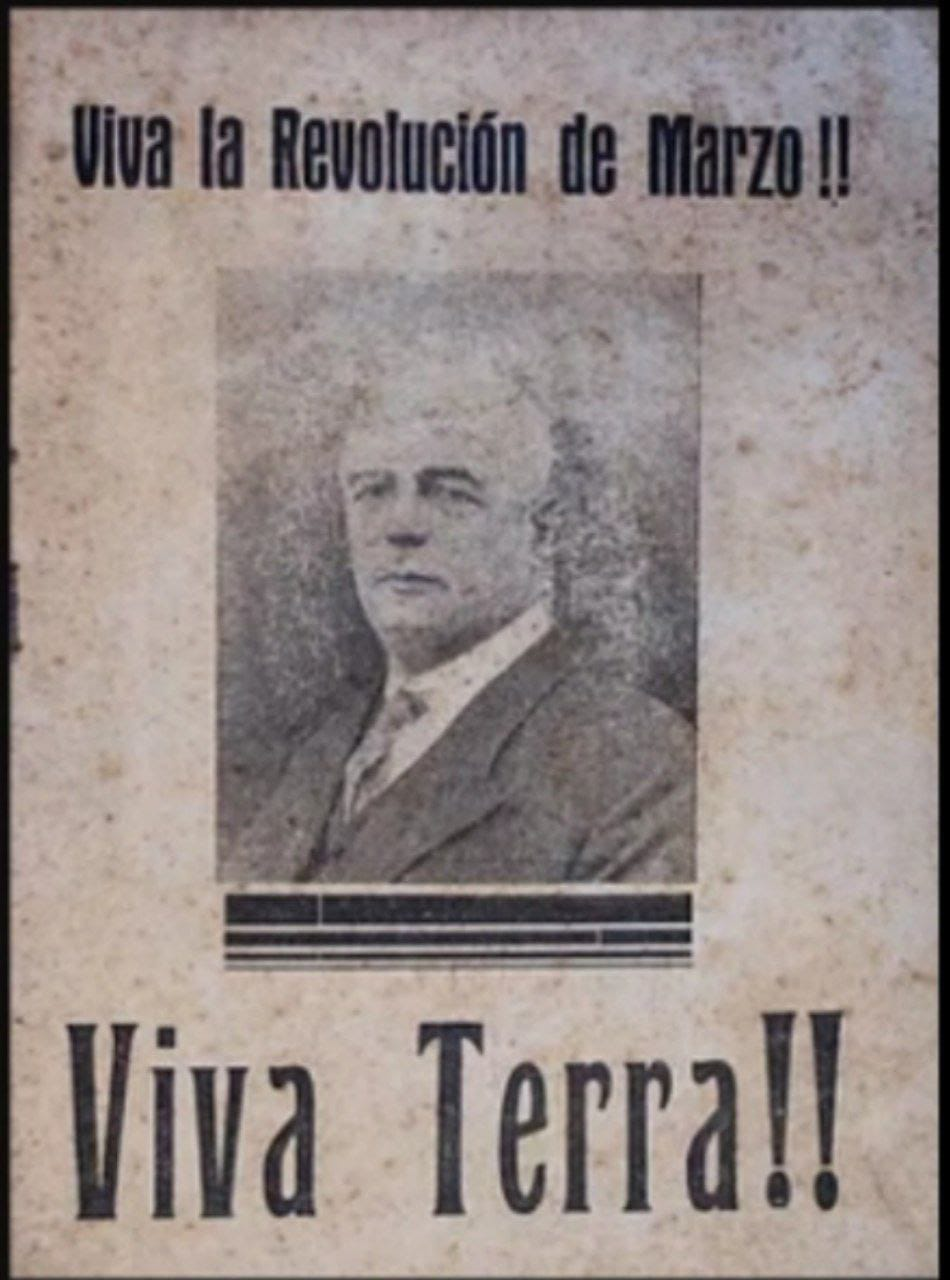
Propaganda poster of the March Revolution, featuring the slogans “Long live the March Revolution” and “Long live Terra”

During the early 1930s, Uruguay was hit hard by the Great Depression, which caused a sharp drop in exports, rising unemployment, currency devaluation, and significant strain on the welfare programs established at the beginning of the 20th century. The economic downturn also sparked a political crisis, centered on the country's dual executive system established by the 1918 Constitution, which combined a President of the Republic with a National Council of Administration. Critics argued that the collegiate system hindered effective governance and limited the government's capacity to address economic challenges. In 1930, Gabriel Terra, a vocal opponent of the dual executive, was elected president.

On 31 March 1933, Terra dissolved Parliament and the National Council of Administration, effectively leading a coup d'état. In what he termed the Revolución Marzista (Spanish for 'March Revolution'), he established a traditionalist, protectionist, and corporatist dictatorship. In terms of foreign policy, his regime maintained relations with countries from both emerging blocs, while developing closer ties with Fascist Italy and Nazi Germany. In December 1935, Uruguay severed diplomatic relations with the Soviet Union, and in 1936 it recognized the National Defense Junta led by Francisco Franco during the Spanish Civil War.

Following Benito Mussolini’s rise to power in Italy, the Italian diplomatic mission in Uruguay sought to promote Fascism among Italian immigrants and their descendants through various associations and cultural institutions. Italian envoy Serafino Mazzolini stated that Mussolini considered Uruguay the most “Italian” country in the Americas due to its significant population of Italian descent, and that the Fascist regime viewed it as a potential future ally in “political, ethnic, and racial” terms. The 1934 Constitution, enacted under Terra's regime, incorporated corporatist principles while formally recognizing human rights to education, health, and labor, as well as freedom of assembly and association. During Italy's invasion of Ethiopia, a group of Uruguayan volunteers traveled to fight with Italian troops.

In 1937, the Uruguayan government awarded the construction of the Rincón del Bonete hydroelectric plant to a consortium of German companies, which brought their own technicians to the country and settled them in a purpose-built town. A rural public school operated there, where the flags of Uruguay and Nazi Germany were displayed together. On the occasion of the plant's inauguration, an exchange of telegrams took place between Adolf Hitler and President Terra.

In March 1938, Alfredo Baldomir Ferrari won the general election—the first national vote in which women were enfranchised—and succeeded Terra as president, marking the end of the authoritarian regime.

=== Pre-war German colonial plans ===
Before war broke out in Europe, the German government planned a coup and invasion of Uruguay to turn the country into a German colony. Supported by local Nazis and led by Arnulf Fuhrmann and run out of the German embassy in Montevideo, the plan never came to fruition. Its leadership was uncovered and arrested.

== Neutrality and Diplomatic Alignment, 1939–42 ==
=== Beginning of the war ===
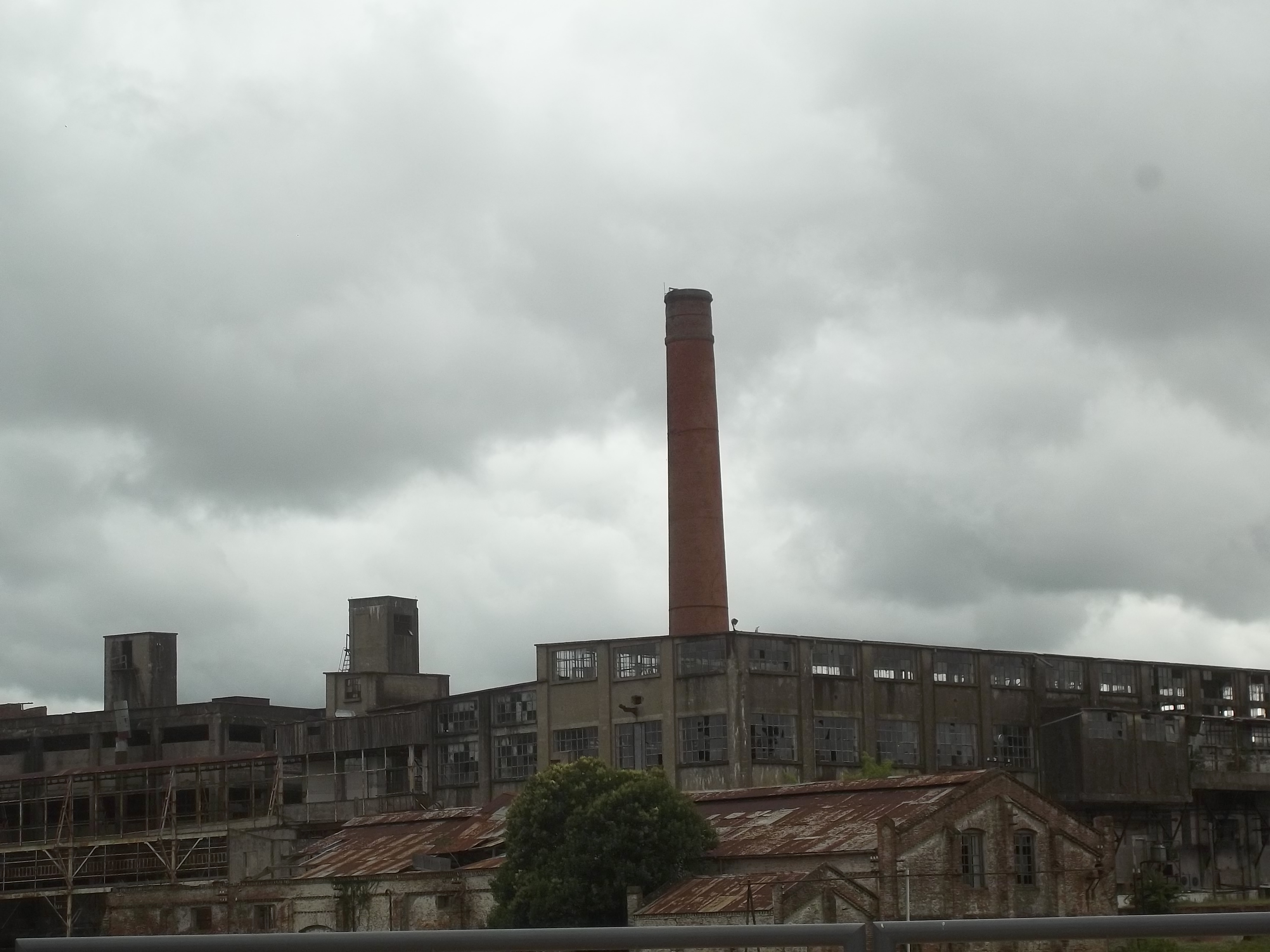
The Frigorífico Anglo del Uruguay in Fray Bentos produced corned beef and canned meats supplied to Allied troops.

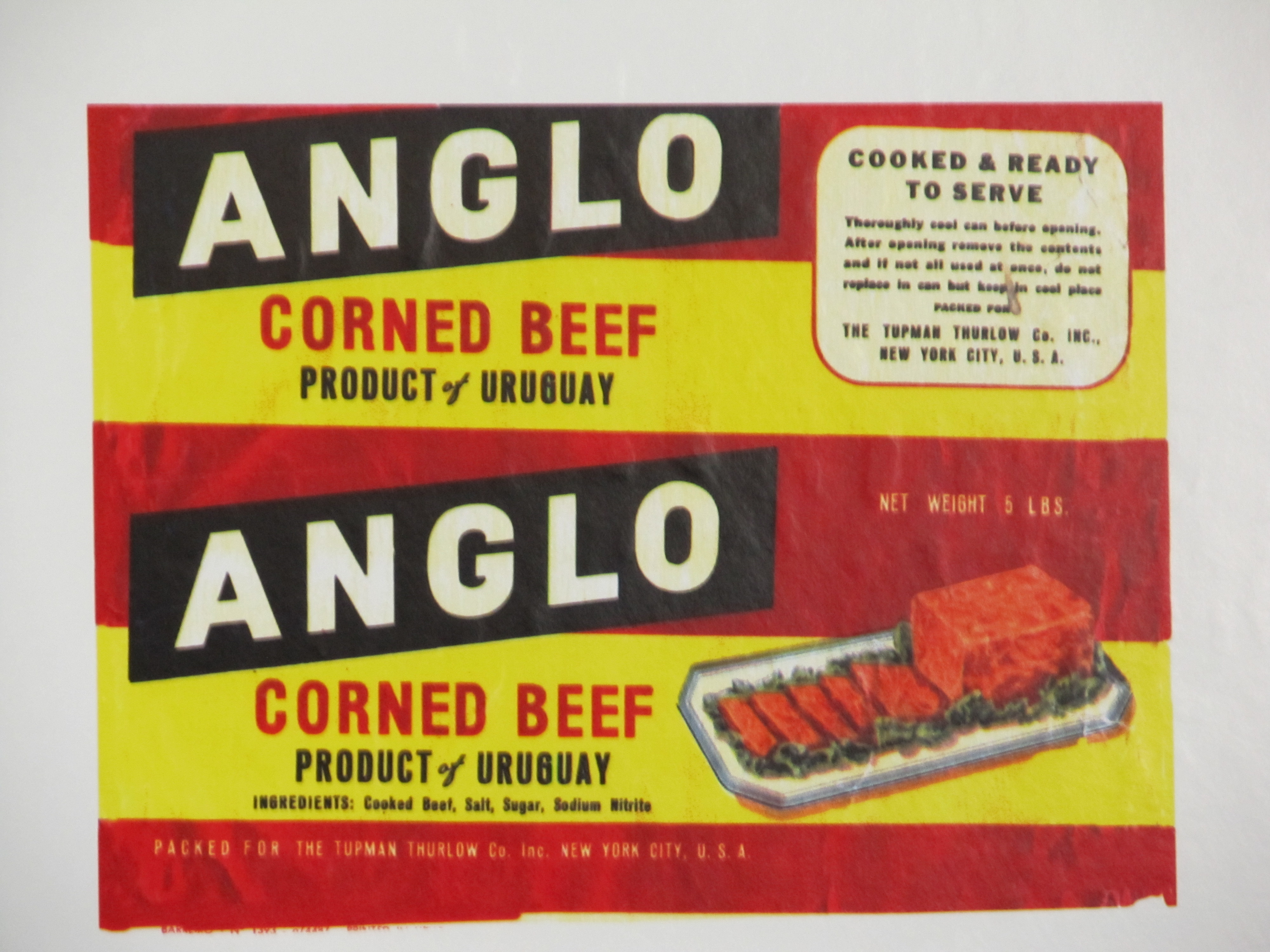
Uruguayan-produced Corned beef, 1940s

On September 5, 1939, five days after the invasion of Poland and the outbreak of the war, President Baldomir Ferrari declared Uruguay's neutrality. Nevertheless, the government adopted a pro-British stance, and using his veto power, Baldomir halted a proposal to nationalize certain foreign companies—mainly British ones—and deliberately earmarked meat supplies for export to Great Britain.

Corned beef produced in Uruguay at the Frigorífico Anglo del Uruguay in Fray Bentos, became a key export supporting Allied forces. The plant, operating since 1865 under the British firm Liebig's Extract of Meat Company—renamed Anglo in 1924—took advantage of abundant cattle, natural pastures, and access to a deepwater port, becoming a center for large-scale canned meat production.

The production process allowed beef to be preserved in cans for extended periods, facilitating transport from Uruguay to Europe and subsequent supply to Allied forces on the front lines. As a result of high demand, corned beef exports boosted the Uruguayan economy and significantly revalued its currency. At its peak, the Anglo meatpacking plant employed over 5,000 workers from more than 50 countries, processing around 400 cattle per hour. Its scale and efficiency earned it the nickname "the kitchen of the world".

=== Battle of the River Plate ===
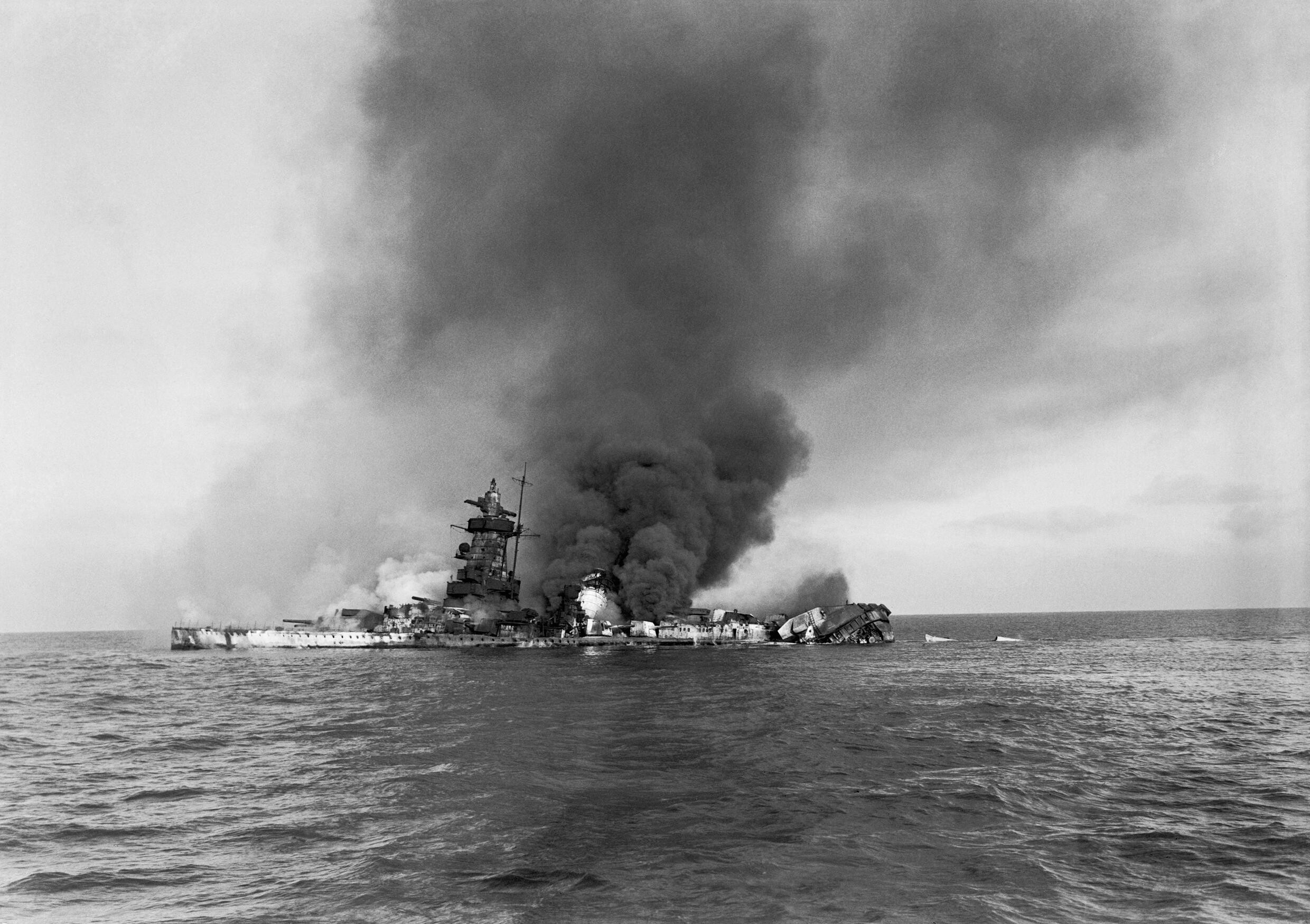
The German pocket battleship Admiral Graf Spee ablaze after being scuttled off Montevideo

On 13 December 1939, the Battle of the River Plate took place off the coast of Uruguay between a British Royal Navy squadron and the German "pocket battleship" Admiral Graf Spee. All four vessels suffered damage and the Graf Spee took refuge in Montevideo harbour. Negotiations began about its status as an active belligerent taking shelter in a neutral country. Millington-Drake played a significant role, making full use of his influence with the Uruguayan government. After a 72-hour layover, the captain of Admiral Graf Spee, having been led to believe that he was hopelessly outnumbered by British reinforcements, ordered the ship to be scuttled in the River Plate estuary. Most of the surviving crew of 1,150 were interned in Uruguay and Argentina and many remained after the war.

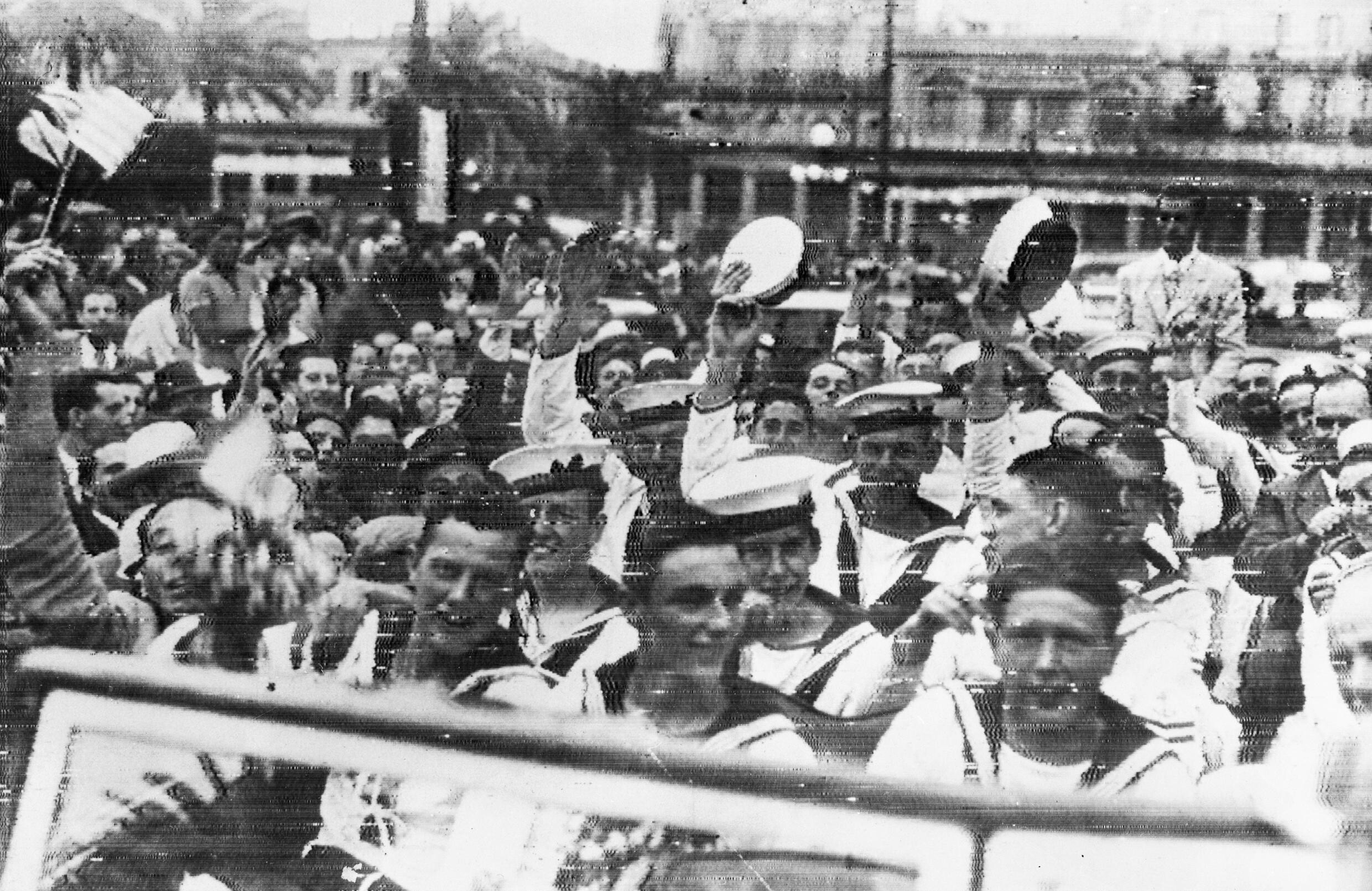
Royal Navy sailors from HMS Ajax being welcomed at Plaza Independencia in Montevideo following the Battle of the River Plate.

A German Embassy official in Uruguay said his government had sent an official letter stating its claims to ownership of the salvage. Any such claim was already invalid because, early in 1940, the Nazi government had sold salvaging rights to the vessel to a Uruguayan businessman who was acting on behalf of the British government but, in any event, salvaging rights would have expired under Uruguayan law.

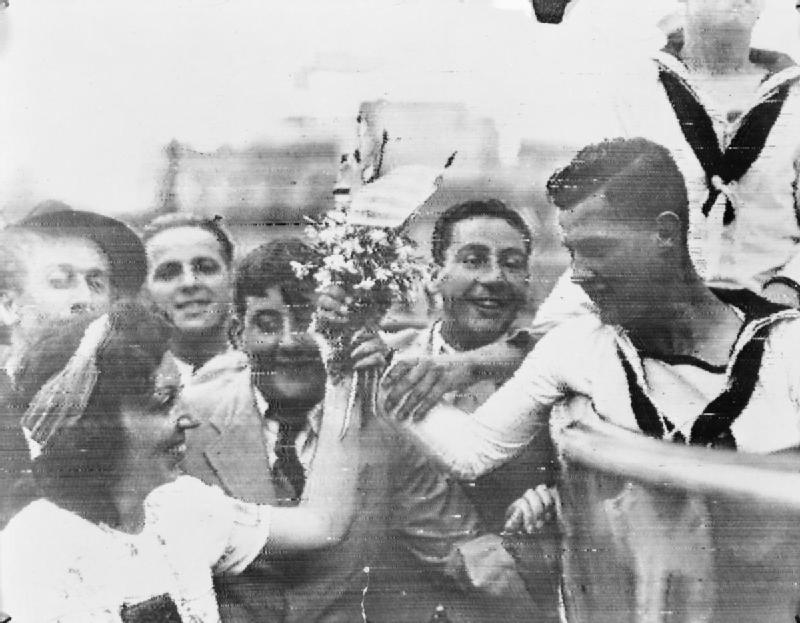
Uruguayan woman presenting flowers to sailors from HMS Ajax .

In June 1940, Germany threatened to break off diplomatic relations with Uruguay. Germany protested that Uruguay had given safe harbour to HMS Carnarvon Castle after it was attacked by a German raider. The ship was repaired with steel plate reportedly salvaged from Admiral Graf Spee.

=== Winter War ===
Following the outbreak of the Winter War between Finland and the Soviet Union, the Uruguayan General Assembly approved a bill presented by President Baldomir and Ministers César Charlone and Alberto Guani, providing a donation of 100,000 Uruguayan pesos to Finland, which was used to purchase wool. The law also established the Commission of Friends of Finland, responsible for raising additional funds.

Additionally, the newspapers La Mañana and El Diario organized a fundraising campaign that purchased and shipped 10,563 350-gram cans of corned beef from the Frigorífico Anglo del Uruguay to the front. Each can bore a label in Finnish: Uruguayn kansa Suomen sankarilliselle armeijalle (Finnish for 'From the people of Uruguay to the heroic army of Finland').

=== Security and defense measures ===
In early 1940, amid concerns over potential Nazi and Fascist infiltration in Uruguay, the General Assembly established a parliamentary commission to investigate German and Italian cultural and sports organizations suspected of serving as fronts for pro-Axis activities. In this context, Law No. 9,936 was enacted, classifying as an "illegal association" any group promoting ideas deemed contrary to the "democratic-republican principles" established in the 1934 Constitution.

Although Uruguay was not a belligerent in the conflict, the Uruguayan Armed Forces underwent a process of reorganization and the Compulsory Military Service Law was passed, subjecting all citizens turning eighteen to conscription. During 1940, the United States government under the administration of Franklin D. Roosevelt, conducted negotiations with Uruguayan authorities to establish naval and air bases on Uruguayan territory, intended to protect the country and the Río de la Plata Basin from a potential Axis attack. The proposal was ultimately rejected by the Senate, with 25 of 26 senators voting in favor of a declaration opposing the plan, following a parliamentary questioning by National Party Senator Eduardo Víctor Haedo directed at Foreign Minister Alberto Guani.

== Ending Neutrality, 1942–45 ==
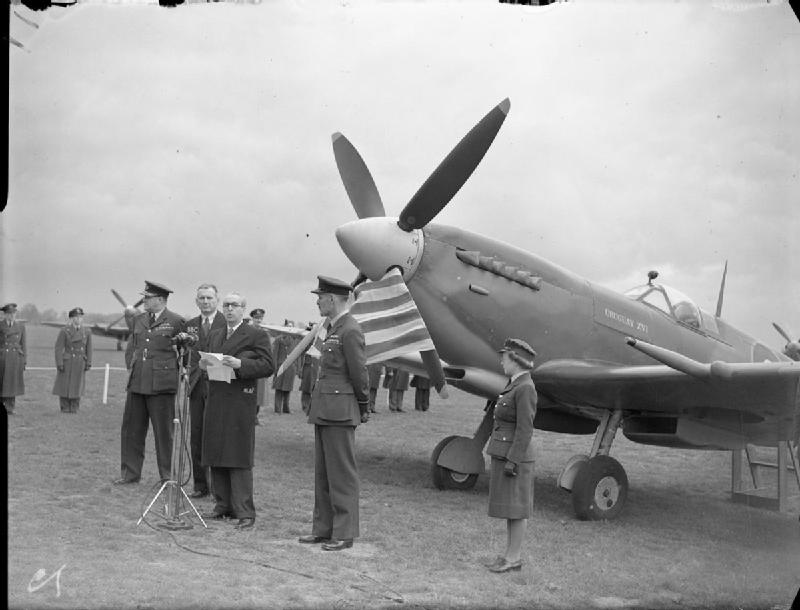
Mr. Montero de Bustamante, Uruguayan Chargé d'Affaires in the United Kingdom, speaking at a 1943 ceremony to name a Royal Air Force Spitfire fighter funded by Uruguayan donations.

On January 25, 1942, Uruguay severed diplomatic relations with the Axis powers—Germany, Italy, and Japan. By ending its neutrality, the country drew closer to the Allied side, aligning with the United States in diplomatic discussions and decision-making forums within the American continent.

On March 8, 1942, the Uruguayan-flagged cargo ship Montevideo, en route to the Port of New York, was sunk by an Italian submarine near the Virgin Islands in the Caribbean Sea, resulting in the deaths of fourteen crew members. Five months later, another Uruguayan cargo vessel, the Maldonado, was intercepted by the German submarine U-510 near Haiti. Its captain, who was the brother of the then Minister of Public Instruction, Cyro Giambruno, was taken prisoner and transferred to Berlin, where he was held for six months before being released via Switzerland. The incident sparked protests in Montevideo and prompted formal complaints from the Uruguayan government.

Following the Liberation of Paris in August 1944, spontaneous celebrations were held in Montevideo, as crowds gathered along 18 de Julio Avenue to mark the occasion. On February 20, 1945, the Chamber of Representatives voted to approve a bill authorizing the Executive Branch to declare war on Germany and Japan—Italy had already signed the Armistice of Cassibile with the Allies. One day later, the Senate passed the bill by a vote of 21 to 30 senators. Finally, on February 22, 1945, the Executive Branch enacted the law, and Uruguay officially declared war on Germany and Japan, thereby signing Declaration by United Nations.

In June, Uruguay signed the Charter of the United Nations and became a founding member of the UN.

== See also ==
- Latin America during World War II
