= Vice President of Uruguay =

Second-highest constitutional office in Uruguay

Vice President of the Oriental Republic of Uruguay
- Vicepresidente de la República Oriental del Uruguay
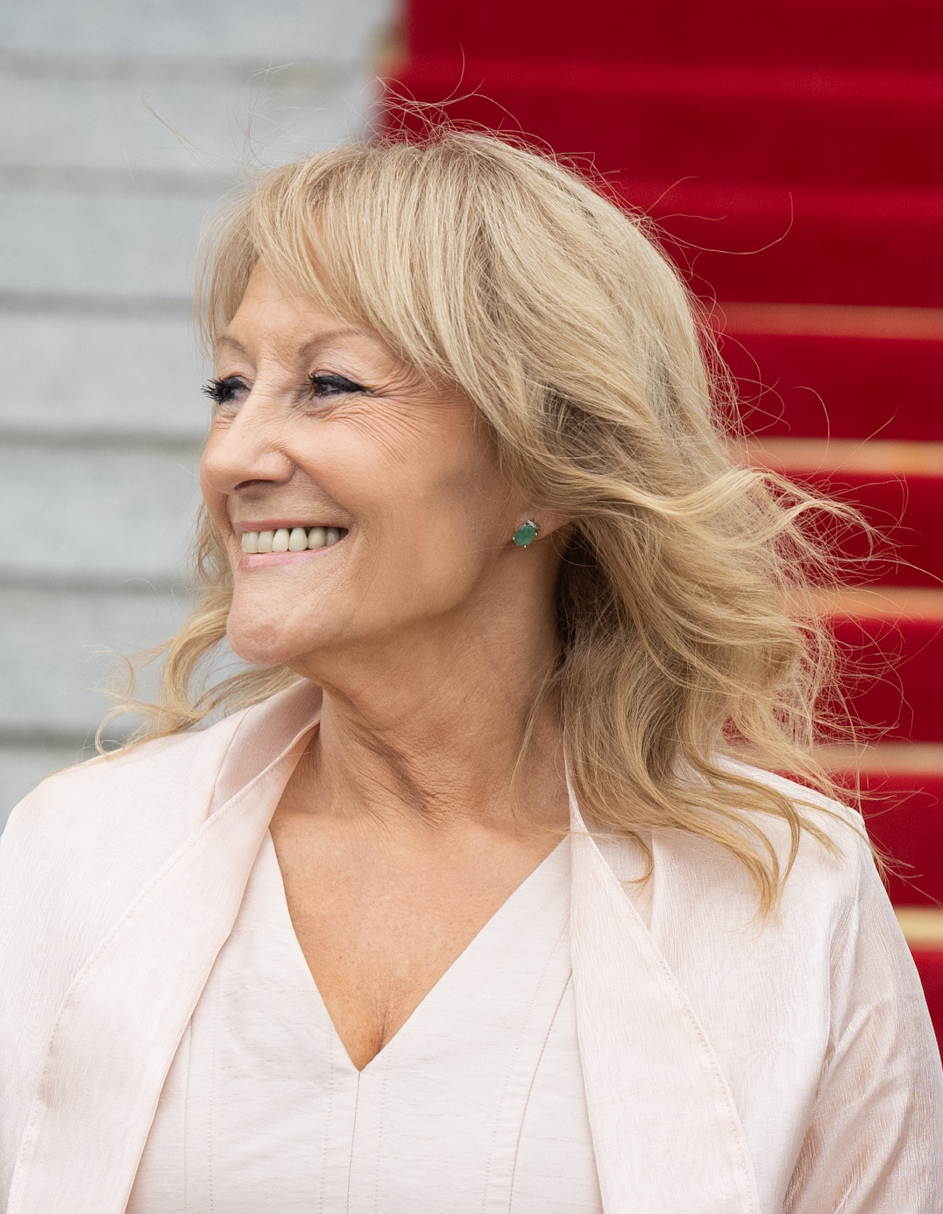
- Incumbent; Carolina Cosse since 1 March 2025
- Seat: Legislative Palace
- Term length: Five years, renewable indefinitely but not immediately
- Inaugural holder: Alfredo Navarro
- Formation: 1 March 1934
- Website: presidencia.gub.uy

The vice president of Uruguay is the person with the second-highest position in the executive branch of the Uruguayan government, after the President of Uruguay. The vice president replaces the elected President in case of death or absence. The vice president is also an officer in the legislative branch, president of the Chamber of Senators and the General Assembly.

The president and vice president run on a single ticket submitted by their party. A runoff is held between the top two candidates if no candidate obtains the majority of votes (50%+1). In this case, the candidate who receives a plurality in the runoff wins the election. The current Vice President is Carolina Cosse, who took office on March 1, 2025.

== History ==
The position of Vice-President of the Republic was established in the Constitution of 1934. Previously, the President of the Senate assumed the Presidency in case of the absence of the President. The Constitution of 1952 established a 9-member executive council, the National Council of Government, abolishing the figure of the Vice President. The Constitution of 1967 eliminated the National Council of Government and resumed the presidential system, maintaining the figure of the Vice President.

== List of vice presidents of Uruguay ==
No.	Portrait	Name (Birth–Death)	Term of office		Political party	Elections	President	Notes
No.	Portrait	Name (Birth–Death)	Start	End	Political party	Elections	President	Notes
1		Alfredo Navarro (1868–1951)	18 May 1934	19 June 1938	Colorado	—	Gabriel Terra	Elected by the 3rd National Constituent Convention.
2		César Charlone (1895–1973)	19 June 1938	1 March 1943	Colorado	1938	Alfredo Baldomir	
3		Alberto Guani (1877–1956)	1 March 1943	1 March 1947	Colorado	1942	Juan José de Amézaga	
4		Luis Batlle Berres (1897–1964)	1 March 1947	2 August 1947	Colorado	1946	Tomás Berreta	Assumed the presidency after the death of Tomás Berreta.
5		Alfeo Brum (1898–1972)	2 August 1947	1 March 1951	Colorado	—	Luis Batlle Berres	Assumed the Vice Presidency as first senator of the most voted party.
5		Alfeo Brum (1898–1972)	1 March 1951	1 March 1952	Colorado	1950	Andrés Martínez Trueba	The post of President and Vice President were replaced by the National Council of Government.
Post abolished 1 March 1952 – 1 March 1967							National Council of Government	
6		Jorge Pacheco Areco (1920–1998)	1 March 1967	6 December 1967	Colorado	1966	Óscar Diego Gestido	Assumed the presidency after the death of Óscar Diego Gestido.
7		Alberto Abdala (1920–1986)	6 December 1967	1 March 1972	Colorado	—	Jorge Pacheco Areco	Assumed the Vice Presidency as first senator of the most voted party.
8		Jorge Sapelli (1926–1996)	1 March 1972	27 June 1973	Colorado	1971	Juan María Bordaberry	Ousted from office by a coup d'état.
Vacant; 27 June 1973 – 1 March 1985							Civic-military dictatorship	
9		Enrique Tarigo (1927–2002)	1 March 1985	1 March 1990	Colorado	1984	Julio María Sanguinetti	
10		Gonzalo Aguirre Ramírez (1940–2021)	1 March 1990	1 March 1995	National	1989	Luis Alberto Lacalle	
11		Hugo Batalla (1926–1998)	1 March 1995	3 October 1998	Colorado	1994	Julio María Sanguinetti	Died in office.
12		Hugo Fernández Faingold (1947–2025)	3 October 1998	1 March 2000	Colorado	—	Julio María Sanguinetti	Assumed the Vice Presidency as first senator of the most voted party.
13		Luis Hierro López (1947–)	1 March 2000	1 March 2005	Colorado	1999	Jorge Batlle	
14		Rodolfo Nin Novoa (1948–)	1 March 2005	1 March 2010	Broad Front	2004	Tabaré Vázquez	
15		Danilo Astori (1940–2023)	1 March 2010	1 March 2015	Broad Front	2009	José Mujica	
16		Raúl Sendic Rodríguez (1962–)	1 March 2015	13 September 2017	Broad Front	2014	Tabaré Vázquez	Resigned.
17		Lucía Topolansky (1944–)	13 September 2017	1 March 2020	Broad Front	—	Tabaré Vázquez	Assumed the Vice Presidency as second senator of the most voted party, as the first senator of the most voted party, José Mujica, can only be President or Vice President until 5 years after his term ends.
18		Beatriz Argimón (1961–)	1 March 2020	1 March 2025	National	2019	Luis Lacalle Pou	Became the first woman elected to this position.
19		Carolina Cosse (1961–)	1 March 2025	Incumbent	Broad Front	2024	Yamandú Orsi	

== Trivia ==
- After decades of exclusively male presence, since 13 September 2017 to date (for 8 years, 11 months and 26 days), the vice-presidency has been held by women without interruption: Lucía Topolansky (the first woman to ever hold the position, in her case, following the resignation of Raúl Sendic), Beatriz Argimón (the first woman directly elected to the position), and Carolina Cosse (in office since 1 March 2025).
- As of 8 September 2026, no openly LGBTQ person has ever held office as vice president.
- César Charlone (5 October 1895 – 8 May 1973) was the youngest vice president to take office (aged 42 years, 8 months and 14 days).
- Lucía Topolansky (born 25 September 1944) was the oldest vice president to take office (aged 72 years, 11 months and 19 days).
- César Charlone was the vice president who lived the longest after leaving office (31 years, 2 months and 17 days); he died at the age of 77 years, 7 months and 3 days.
- Danilo Astori (23 April 1940 – 10 November 2023) was the vice president who lived the shortest time after completing his term (8 years, 8 months and 9 days). But at the same time, he was the longest-lived: he died at the age of 83 years, 6 months and 18 days.
- Alberto Abdala (8 April 1920 – 13 January 1986) was the shortest-lived vice president: he died at the age of 65 years, 9 months and 5 days.
- Alfeo Brum (22 March 1898 – 25 February 1972) was the last vice president born in the 19th century.
- Jorge Pacheco Areco (9 April 1920 – 29 July 1998) was the first vice president born in the 20th century.
- As of 8 September 2026, Hugo Batalla (11 July 1926 – 3 October 1998) has been the only vice president to have died in office. Further, he was the last vice president who died in the 20th century.
- Enrique Tarigo (15 September 1927 – 14 December 2002) has been the only vice president who had not held any public office before being elected to the vice-presidency, nor did he hold any elected office again afterwards. Further, he was the first vice president who died in the 21st century.
- Rodolfo Nin Novoa (born 25 January 1948) and Carolina Cosse (born 25 December 1961) are, to date, the only vice presidents who were previously intendants of a department (Cerro Largo and Montevideo, respectively).
- Raúl Sendic (born 29 August 1962) was the only vice president to be forced to resign amid a political scandal.
- Jorge Sapelli (8 March 1926 – 13 January 1996) was the only vice president to resign in opposition to a coup d'état, in 1973.

== See also ==
- List of current vice presidents
- History of Uruguay
- Politics of Uruguay
