= Enrique Tarigo =

Uruguayan politician (1927–2002)

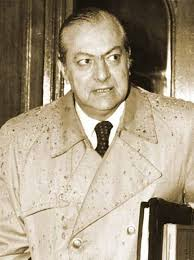

9th Vice President of Uruguay
- In office March 1, 1985 – March 1, 1990
- President: Julio María Sanguinetti
- Preceded by: Jorge Sapelli
- Succeeded by: Gonzalo Aguirre

Personal details
- Born: September 15, 1927 Montevideo, Uruguay
- Died: December 14, 2002 (aged 75) Montevideo, Uruguay
- Party: Colorado Party
- Spouse: Susana Isabel Morador López
- Children: Enrique, Miguel, Alejandro, Gabriela, Juan Felipe
- Occupation: Politician, journalist, lawyer, teacher

Enrique E. Tarigo Vázquez (15 September 1927 – 14 December 2002) was a Uruguayan jurist and political figure.

== Background ==
He was a lawyer and University professor.

== Vice President of Uruguay ==
He was Vice President of Uruguay from 1985 to 1990, in the first period of democratic government after the civilian-military administration of 1973–1985, serving under President Julio María Sanguinetti. A notable feature of his appointment to office was that the vice presidency had been vacant since the resignation of Vice President Jorge Sapelli in 1973. He served also the President of the Senate of Uruguay.

Tarigo was one of the most important persons in the movement to obtain the exit of the civilian-military government.

=== Succession ===
Tarigo was succeeded as vice president in 1990 by Gonzalo Aguirre.

=== Historical note ===
Tarigo was the ninth person to hold the office of Vice President of Uruguay. The office dates from 1934, when Alfredo Navarro became Uruguay's first vice president.

With Tarigo as running mate, Sanguinetti agreed to revive the office of vice president, despite the fact that the last Vice President of Uruguay had in practical terms caused the office to go into abeyance when he publicly repudiated sitting president Bordaberry (whom Sanguinetti had also served as a minister, and with whom he dissented on issues relating to the civilian-military government of 1973-1985).

=== Death ===
Tarigo died in 2002, victim of cancer.

== See also ==
- Politics of Uruguay

Political offices
Preceded by Jorge Sapelli	Vice President of Uruguay; 1985-1990	Succeeded by Gonzalo Aguirre
