= Alberto Abdala =

Vice-President of Uruguay from 1967 to 1972

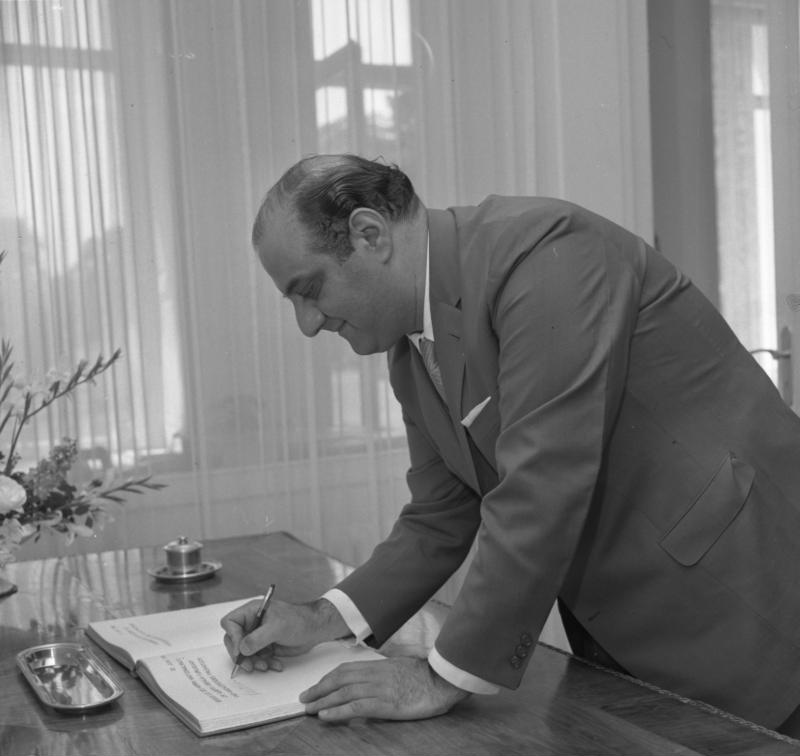
- Abdala in 1966

Vice President of Uruguay
- In office 6 December 1967 – 1 March 1972
- President: Jorge Pacheco Areco
- Preceded by: Jorge Pacheco Areco
- Succeeded by: Jorge Sapelli

Minister of Interior
- In office 16 May 1956 – 28 May 1957
- President: National Council of Government
- Preceded by: Francisco Gamarra
- Succeeded by: Héctor Grauert

Personal details
- Born: Alberto Abdala; 8 April 1920 Maldonado, Uruguay
- Died: 13 January 1986 (aged 65) Montevideo, Uruguay
- Party: Colorado

Alberto Abdala (Arabic: البرتو عبد الله; 8 April 1920 – 13 January 1986) was an Uruguayan attorney, politician, painter and Vice-President from 1967 to 1972.

== Background ==
Alberto Abdala was born in Maldonado, Uruguay in 1920. He was of Lebanese descent, his parents Jawarjis and Miriam Abdallah having migrated from Kousba, Koura District to Uruguay in 1915.

He was a member of the Colorado Party. He served as Interior Minister and later as member of the National Council of Government (Uruguay).

In 1966, the "Batllismo" faction of the Colorado Party did not have a natural leader to run for the presidential elections of November of that year, after the death in 1964 of the faction's leader, former President Luis Batlle. Some members of the faction insisted that Abdala should be the presidential candidate representing this sector, including Luis Batlle'son, Jorge Batlle. Ultimately, Abdala refused to run and future President Jorge Batlle was finally selected.

== Vice President of Uruguay ==
After the death of President Óscar Gestido, and the succession to the presidency of Vice President Jorge Pacheco, Alberto Abdala, being the first senator on "Unidad y Reforma" Senate list (the most voted Senate list within the Colorado Party), became Vice President. He diverged from many political decisions taken by the Pacheco administration, without, however, resigning. He considered a run for the Presidency in the 1971 elections, but in the end desisted, not wanting to split Unidad y Reforma, and supported a new bid for the presidency by Jorge Batlle.

=== Historical note ===
Abdala was the seventh person to hold the office of Vice President of Uruguay. The office dates from 1934, when Alfredo Navarro became Uruguay's first Vice President.

== Subsequent events and legacy ==
Abdala was succeeded 1972 as Vice President of Uruguay by Jorge Sapelli, whose differences with the Administration in which he served would, unlike Abdala, lead him to repudiate the office of Vice President, and which thus went into abeyance for many years.

He is remembered as a quite popular political figure, even though the year after he stepped down the office which he held disappeared for many years.

Alberto Abdala died in Montevideo in 1986.

== See also ==
- Politics of Uruguay
- Lebanese Uruguayan

Political offices
Preceded by Jorge Pacheco	Vice President of Uruguay; 1967–1972	Succeeded by Jorge Sapelli
