= Jorge Sapelli =

Uruguayan political figure

Jorge Sapelli (March 8, 1926 – January 13, 1996) was an Uruguayan political figure. He was the Vice President of Uruguay from 1972 until his resignation in 1973.

== Vice President of Uruguay ==
=== 1972–1973 ===
Sapelli served in President Juan María Bordaberry's Administration as Vice President of Uruguay until June 1973. It may be noted, in the light of subsequent controversies, that his actual service as vice president is little reported on or analyzed.

=== June 1973 resignation ===
When President Juan María Bordaberry decided with the Military Forces to dissolve the Parliament in June 1973, Sapelli resigned, as he did not agree with this decision that began the long period of civilian-military rule by decree in Uruguay (1973–1985), widely described by observers as a dictatorship.

It would be fair to state that Sapelli's resignation is given far more analysis than his actual service as vice president.

=== Historical note ===
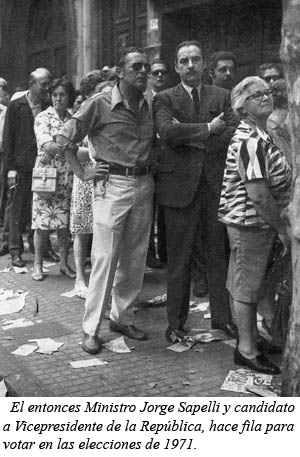

Sapelli was the eighth person to hold the office of Vice President of Uruguay. The office dates from 1934, when Alfredo Navarro became Uruguay's first Vice President.

== Legacy ==
Sapelli's political career arguably commands multifaceted perceptions of a legacy.

Some observers would argue that Sapelli's action in dissociating himself with Juan María Bordaberry in 1973, under whom he had been serving, demonstrated himself to be a figure of constitutional principle. Others would argue that the position of Vice President of Uruguay, and such power as the holder of the office exercises, is mainly significant to the extent that the holder is prepared to identify himself unreservedly with the current President of Uruguay, and that in any case the office of Vice President of Uruguay originated from the period of the Presidency of Gabriel Terra, 1931–1938, who ruled by decree.

It may be noted also that, unlike some holders of the somewhat intermittent office of Vice President of Uruguay (e.g., the distinguished Uruguayan diplomat Alberto Guani), Sapelli was a relatively untried political figure prior to his assumption of the Vice Presidency, and as such was largely dependent upon the patronage of President Juan María Bordaberry, whom he in any case publicly repudiated in 1973.

It may also be observed that when Sapelli repudiated President Bordaberry in 1973, the circumstances of the office of Vice President of Uruguay going into abeyance, it was not until 1985 that the office was revived. Thus his legacy is many-faceted, with the (in the past) long ruling Colorado Party (Uruguay) somewhat belatedly holding him to be a figure of principle, while ironically celebrating him as one who caused the office which he held to go into abeyance for over a decade.

To put into context Sapelli's reputation within Uruguayan political culture, it may be noted also that the reputation of a predecessor as Vice President of Uruguay, Alberto Guani, has largely emerged unscathed despite having served in the Administration of President of Uruguay Gabriel Terra, who, as President Bordaberry was later to do, ruled by decree.

== See also ==
- Politics of Uruguay
- Vice President of Uruguay

Political offices
Preceded by Alberto Abdala	Vice President of Uruguay; 1972–1973	Succeeded by Vacant
