= Sapelli =

Sapelli may refer to:

- Sapele, an African tree
- Jorge Sapelli, former Vice President of Uruguay
