= 1942 Uruguayan constitutional referendum =

A constitutional referendum was held in Uruguay on 29 November 1942, alongside general elections. The new constitution was approved by 77% of voters.

== Background ==
On 18 June 1941 a group of General Assembly members had put forward constitutional amendments. However, it was clear that the proposals would not be approved by a majority of voters, and President Alfredo Baldomir subsequently dissolved the General Assembly on 21 February 1942.

A commission, composed of the largest party, put forward a draft constitution on 28 May, with some small changes to the previous amendments. Baldomir then issued a decree stating that the new constitution would be approved if a majority of those voting were in favour, rather than the previous requirement, established in the 1934 constitution, of a majority of registered voters voting in favour.

== New constitution ==
The new constitution would limit the President and Vice President to a single term in office. It provided for a bicameral General Assembly, with a Senate elected by proportional representation. The lema system would be abolished.

Constitutional initiatives would be possible if supported by 10% of registered voters (reduced from 20%), with the General Assembly allowed to put forward a counter-proposal. Amendments would require a majority vote in both houses of the General Assembly, approval by a Constitutional Council, and then a referendum, in which at least 35% of registered voters must vote in favour.

== Results ==
Choice	Votes	%
For	443,414	77.17
Against	131,163	22.83
Total	574,577	100.00
Registered voters/turnout	858,713	–
Source: Direct Democracy

== See also ==
- Uruguayan Constitution
