= Hugo Batalla =

Uruguayan politician

Vice President of Uruguay
- In office March 1, 1995 – October 3, 1998
- President: Julio María Sanguinetti

Senator
- In office 1985–1995

Diputado for the Department of Montevideo
- In office 1962–66, 1967–71, 1972–73

President of the Chamber of Deputies of Uruguay
- In office 1969–1970

Personal details
- Born: July 11, 1926
- Died: October 3, 1998 (aged 72)
- Party: Colorado Party; Frente Amplio; Party for the Government of the People

Hugo Batalla Parentini (July 11, 1926 – October 3, 1998) was a Uruguayan politician who was Vice President of Uruguay from 1995 to 1998 during the presidency of Julio María Sanguinetti.

== Background ==
His political activity started in the Colorado Party with Zelmar Michelini. Batalla was elected diputado for the Department of Montevideo from 1962–66 and 1967–71, and was President of the Chamber of Deputies of Uruguay from 1969 to 1970. He was also a member of the Latin American Parliament and vice-president from 1968–69.

He split from Colorado in 1971 to form the Frente Amplio with Michelini, and was re-elected diputado from 1972 until the installation of the military dictatorship in June 1973.

After the return of constitutional rule, he was elected senator for the Party for the Government of the People (which would later rejoin the Frente Amplio) from 1985–1995, and was Vice-President of the Chamber of Senators during 1993. He also ran as a presidential candidate in 1989.

== Vice President of Uruguay ==
Batalla rejoined the Colorado Party for the elections of 1994-11-27 and was elected Vice President of Uruguay.

He died in office of lung cancer at the age of 72.

=== Historical note ===
Batalla was the eleventh person to hold the office of Vice President of Uruguay. The office dates from 1934, when Alfredo Navarro became Uruguay's first vice president.

== Other activities ==
Aside from politics, Batalla founded the newspaper Hechos and the political magazine Zeta. He was also President of the Asociación Uruguaya de Fútbol (AUF, Uruguayan Football Association) from 1991–93, and Vice-president of the Confederación Sudamericana de Fútbol (CSF, South American Football Confederation) between 1992 and 1993.

== Personal ==
Batalla married Hilda Flores in 1953, and the couple had a daughter Laura.

== See also ==
- Politics of Uruguay

Political offices
Preceded by Gonzalo Aguirre	Vice President of Uruguay; 1995–1998	Succeeded by Hugo Fernández Faingold
Sporting positions
Preceded by Julio Maglione	Uruguayan Football Association; 1991–1993	Succeeded by Carlos Maresca
