= Constitution of Uruguay of 1942 =

The fourth Constitution of Uruguay was in force between 1942 and 1952. It was the product of a "constitutional coup" led by President Alfredo Baldomir, who dissolved the General Assembly in February 1942. Approved in a referendum on 29 November 1942 with 77% of the vote, it replaced the previous constitutional text. The new constitution dismantled the power-sharing mechanisms of the 1934 charter, such as mandatory coparticipation in ministries and an arbitrarily divided Senate.

== Overview ==
The constitution originated from a "constitutional coup" by President Alfredo Baldomir. On February 21, 1942, he dissolved the General Assembly and replaced it with a Council of State, which drafted the new text.

The new charter introduced several key changes from the 1934 constitution. It abolished the mandatory coparticipation in ministries and the boards of state entities. It also eliminated the arbitrary division of the Senate between the two political factions that had participated in the 1933 coup, replacing it with a system of election by strict proportional representation.

The constitution was submitted to a plebiscite and approved by 77% of the electorate in November 1942. This Constitution was in force for a decade, until it was replaced by the Constitution of Uruguay of 1952.

== See also ==
- Constitution of Uruguay
- Alfredo Baldomir
- 1942 Uruguayan constitutional referendum
