= César Charlone =

César Charlone may refer to:

- César Charlone (politician) (1895–1973), Vice President of Uruguay
- César Charlone (cinematographer) (born 1958), Academy Award-nominated cinematographer from Uruguay
