= Gonzalo Aguirre Ramírez =

Uruguayan politician (1940–2021)

Gonzalo Aguirre Ramirez

10th Vice President of Uruguay
- In office 1 March 1990 – 1 March 1995
- President: Luis Alberto Lacalle
- Preceded by: Enrique Tarigo
- Succeeded by: Hugo Batalla

Senator of Uruguay
- In office 15 February 1985 – 1 March 1990
- Constituency: Montevideo

Personal details
- Born: 25 January 1940 Montevideo, Uruguay
- Died: 27 April 2021 (aged 81)
- Party: National Party
- Spouse: Marga Sosa
- Parent(s): Tomás Aguirre Rosselló; Irene Ramírez García

Gonzalo Aguirre Ramírez (25 January 1940 – 27 April 2021) was a Uruguayan politician, lawyer, and newspaper columnist. He served as Vice President of Uruguay from 1990 to 1995.

== Background ==
Gonzalo Aguirre was a politician from the National Party (Uruguay). He studied law in his youth and became a well-known lawyer specializing in constitutional law. He became politically active during the military regime in Uruguay, 1973-1985. In the 1984 elections, which put an end to de facto rule, he was selected as vice-presidential running mate of Alberto Zumaran, the candidate of the majority faction of his party, Por la Patria. The leader of the Por la Patria faction, Wilson Ferreira Aldunate, was imprisoned and prohibited from running for president. Aguirre was at the time member of the Movimiento Nacional de Rocha faction. In this way, the alliance between these two factions was repeated, as it had already taken place in the 1971 elections. Although Zumaran-Aguirre emerged victorious within the National Party, the Blancos lost the election to the Colorado Party and its main candidate, Julio María Sanguinetti. Aguirre nevertheless was elected Senator for his faction.

In 1987, Aguirre split from the Movimiento Nacional de Rocha and founded his own sector, Renovación y Victoria. In 1988, the Herrerismo faction led by Luis Alberto Lacalle entered an alliance with Renovación y Victoria, and Aguirre became the running mate of Lacalle.

== Vice President of Uruguay ==
In the November 1989 elections, Lacalle-Aguirre won within the National Party and defeated the Colorado Party and other parties.

After taking office as Vice President of Uruguay in March 1990, Aguirre supported with a varying degree of enthusiasm the free-market policies espoused by the Lacalle administration. In March 1993, Renovación y Victoria abandoned the coalition government of Lacalle, although Aguirre remained as vice-president (the vice president in Uruguay is elected by the people for a fixed five-year term). In March 1994, Aguirre was chosen by his faction to be a presidential candidate in the November 1994 elections, but in early October of that year he renounced his candidacy after Julio María Sanguinetti, former President and candidate of the Foro Batllista faction of the Colorado Party, alleged that his candidacy was incompatible (in Uruguay, the vice-president may not occupy the presidency, even temporarily, three months before the general elections, and Aguirre had replaced Lacalle in August when the President had gone on a visit abroad). Aguirre therefore supported the candidacy of his cousin, Juan Andrés Ramírez, candidate of the Herrerismo faction. The National Party narrowly lost the elections to the Colorado Party.

== Later career ==
Aguirre failed to get elected to any office both in the 1994 and in the 1999 elections. In 1999, he supported Juan Andrés Ramírez in the primary elections of April 1999, although Ramírez lost to Luis Alberto Lacalle. In the October 1999 elections, he was a candidate for the Senate for Alianza Nacional, but failed to be elected.

In recent years, Aguirre abandoned active politics, his faction, Renovación y Victoria, effectively disappearing after 1999. In the 2004 primary elections, he supported Jorge Larrañaga, who became the Party's nominee for the presidential elections of October 2004, but who lost to Tabaré Vázquez and the Frente Amplio.

Aguirre continued to practice law and for many years was a distinguished columnist for Uruguay's main daily newspaper, El País (Uruguay).

Lately he re-joined Lacalle.

== See also ==
- Politics of Uruguay
- List of political families#Uruguay

Political offices
Preceded by Enrique Tarigo	Vice President of Uruguay; 1990–1995	Succeeded by Hugo Batalla
