= Óscar Diego Gestido =

Uruguayan politician (1901–1967)

General Óscar Diego Gestido
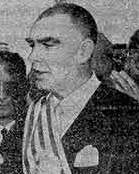
- Diego Gestido in 1967

32nd President of Uruguay
- In office 1 March 1967 – 6 December 1967
- Vice President: Jorge Pacheco Areco
- Preceded by: National Council of Government (presided by Alberto Héber Usher); Andrés Martínez Trueba (as President, 1952)
- Succeeded by: Jorge Pacheco Areco

Member of the National Council of Government
- In office 1 March 1963 – 1 March 1967

Personal details
- Born: 3 November 1901 Montevideo, Uruguay
- Died: 6 December 1967 (aged 66) Montevideo, Uruguay
- Party: Colorado Party
- Spouse: Elisa de los Campos
- Children: 3
- Parents: Antonio Gestido (Father); Josefina Pose (Mother)
- Education: University of Montevideo
- Occupation: Politician, Military officer

Military service
- Allegiance: Uruguay
- Branch/service: Uruguayan Army
- Years of service: 1920–1957
- Rank: General
- Commands: Uruguayan Army (March–December 1967)

Óscar Diego Gestido Pose (3 November 1901 – 6 December 1967), was a Uruguayan politician and military officer who was the 32nd President of Uruguay from March 1967 until his death in December of the same year.

== Biography ==
Diego Gestido was from a military background, and served in the military for 36 years before retiring with the rank of general in 1957. Afterwards he had an important participation during the Uruguayan floods of April 1959, being considered a hero. He was also a member of the Colorado Party.

=== President of Uruguay ===
On 27 November 1966 elections were celebrated, together with a constitutional referendum which gave place to a new Constitution restoring one-person presidency. Diego Gestido was elected president.

Prominent people in his government included Vice President Jorge Pacheco Areco, César Charlone, Luis Hierro Gambardella, Julio Lacarte Muró, Manuel Flores Mora, and Zelmar Michelini, who later co-founded the Frente Amplio grouping.

=== Death and succession ===
Diego Gestido died in office. His remains were buried at the Central Cemetery of Montevideo. His death meant that three Uruguayan Presidents had died in office in a 20-year period. He was immediately succeeded by his vice president, Pacheco Areco.

== Family ==
His brother Álvaro Gestido was a notable Uruguayan football player.

== Honors ==
- Rivera International Airport is named after him.

== See also ==
- Politics of Uruguay

Political offices
Preceded by Alberto Héber Usher as Chairman of the National Council of Government	32nd President of Uruguay; March–December 1967	Succeeded by Jorge Pacheco Areco
Vacant Title last held by Andrés Martínez Trueba (1952)	32nd President of Uruguay; March–December 1967	Succeeded by Jorge Pacheco Areco
Government offices
