= Jorge Pacheco Areco =

Uruguayan politician

Jorge Pacheco
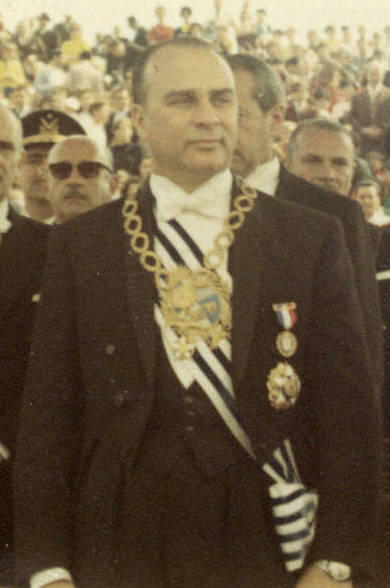
- Pacheco in 1968

33rd President of Uruguay
- In office December 6, 1967 – March 1, 1972
- Vice President: Alberto Abdala
- Preceded by: Óscar Gestido
- Succeeded by: Juan María Bordaberry

Vice President of Uruguay
- In office March 1, 1967 – December 6, 1967
- President: Óscar Gestido
- Preceded by: Martin Echegoyen (as President of the Senate); Alfeo Brum (as Vice President, 1952)
- Succeeded by: Alberto Abdala

Personal details
- Born: Jorge Pacheco Areco; April 9, 1920 Montevideo
- Died: July 29, 1998 (aged 78) Montevideo
- Party: Colorado Party
- Spouses: Gladys Herrera; María Angélica Klein; María Cristina Gori Salvo; Graciela Rompani
- Children: Ricardo; Jorge; María Isabel
- Occupation: Politician; journalist; diplomat

Jorge Pacheco Areco (Spanish pronunciation: [ˈxoɾxe paˈt͡ʃeko aˈɾeko]; April 9, 1920 – July 29, 1998) was a Uruguayan politician and journalist and the 33rd president of Uruguay, serving from 1967 to 1972. Formerly the Vice President of Uruguay Pacheco became President after the sudden death of Óscar Diego Gestido. A member of the Colorado Party, Pacheco Areco had previously been a member of the National Representative from 1963 to 1967, before becoming the vice president.

Areco has been identified with right-wing politics, with one study has arguing that "By the late 1960s and early 1970s Colorado presidents such as Jorge Pacheco Areco and Juan Maria Bordaberry, while paying lip service to Batlle's ideals, led right-wing administrations."

== Early life ==
Pacheco Areco Johnson was born on April 9, 1920 in Montevideo, son of physician and politician Manuel Pacheco González and Lilina Ofelia Areco Quintana. Born into a family of politicians, his paternal grandfather, Melchor Pacheco Stewart, was the brother of Matilde Pacheco, wife of President José Batlle y Ordóñez. While his maternal grandfather was the jurist Ricardo Areco.

== Early political career ==
Pacheco joined the Colorado Party in the late 1950s, and was elected to the Chamber of Deputies in 1962. Starting in 1967, In the government of President Gestido he was sixth person to hold the title of Vice President, a post which was revived when he took office, having been abolished several years earlier.

== Presidential term (1967–1972) ==
On December 6, 1967, Vice President Pacheco was sworn in when President Gestido died suddenly after a few months in office. Pacheco immediately implemented price and wage freezes in an attempt to control inflation, and enforced a state of emergency in June 1968 to stem the resulting labour disputes. His administration fought the Tupamaros, an urban guerrilla group officially known as the Movimiento de Liberación Nacional (MLN) since being formed in 1963. Police forces killed a student named Líber Arce during his presidency. The government, with Parliament's approval, imposed emergency measures from June 1968 to March 1969. Since Uruguay's constitution does not allow a president to run for immediate re-election, a referendum for constitutional reform was submitted to allow Pacheco to run for a second term in 1971, but it did not pass.

== Post-presidential years (1972–1998) ==
After Pacheco left office, his successor Juan María Bordaberry appointed him as Uruguay's Ambassador to Spain. Later, President Aparicio Méndez appointed him Ambassador to Switzerland and then to the United States. Pacheco returned to Uruguay in 1982, to run in the all-party primaries of 1982, the first step towards democratization after a military takeover in 1973. The "Batllismo" faction of the Colorado Party, led by Julio María Sanguinetti, won the primary, bringing Pacheco's faction of the Colorado Party to an end for several years. In 1984, Pacheco ran for president against Sanguinetti again, and lost. Pacheco supported the new Colorado administration, and his UCB Party was represented in the cabinet. Sanguinetti designated Pacheco to be Ambassador to Paraguay. After returning from Paraguay, Pacheco ran for president again in 1989, obtaining the UCB nomination, but lost a third time.

Pacheco was part of the coalition government of President Luis Alberto Lacalle, causing a split with his former running mate, Pablo Millor, who took with him half of the UCB's elected representatives, in order to form "Cruzada 94", a new within the Colorados. With his health in a quite frail state, Pacheco ran for President in 1994, losing to Sanguinetti, and then retired from active politics. Making only an occasional public appearance for the rest of his life, he died on July 29, 1998. As the former President of Uruguay, Pacheco was buried with presidential honours at the Central Cemetery of Montevideo.

== In popular culture ==
- Pacheco Areco was portrayed by Nemesio Antúnez in the 1972 political thriller film State of Siege.

== See also ==
- Politics of Uruguay
- Colorado Party (Uruguay)
- Fructuoso Rivera#Later legacy
- List of political families#Uruguay
- List of Uruguayan Ambassadors to the United States
- Tupamaro National Liberation Movement

Political offices
Preceded by "Colegiado": No Vice President	Vice President of Uruguay; 1967	Succeeded by Alberto Abdala
Preceded by Óscar Diego Gestido	President of Uruguay; 1967–1972	Succeeded by Juan María Bordaberry
