= Juan José de Amézaga =

Uruguayan political figure

Juan José de Amézaga Landaraso
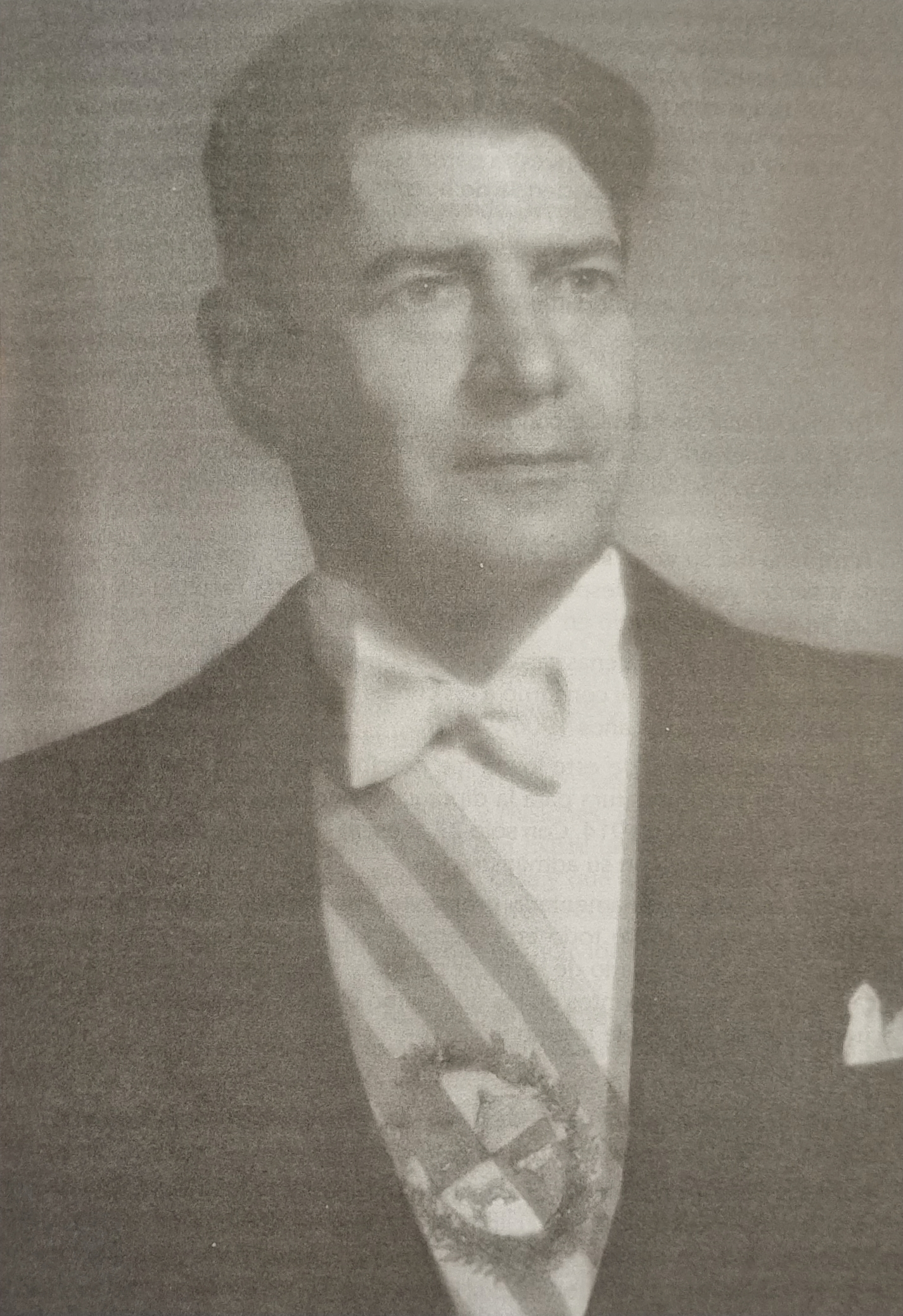

28th President of Uruguay
- In office March 1, 1943 – March 1, 1947
- Vice President: Alberto Guani
- Preceded by: Alfredo Baldomir
- Succeeded by: Tomás Berreta

Personal details
- Born: January 28, 1881 Montevideo, Uruguay
- Died: August 21, 1956 (aged 75) Montevideo, Uruguay
- Party: Colorado Party
- Spouse: Celia Álvarez Mouliá
- Education: Universidad de la República
- Occupation: Political, advocate

Juan José de Amézaga Landaroso (January 28, 1881 – August 21, 1956) was a Uruguayan political figure and 28th President of Uruguay.

== Background ==
Amézaga was a prominent member of the Colorado Party, which ruled the country for long periods. He was a lawyer by profession, and taught that subject at university level for many years. His political base was in Durazno, which he represented in the Chamber of Deputies between 1907 and 1915.

Amézaga graduated from the University of Montevideo in 1905 with a degree in Law and Social Sciences, and was granted a scholarship by the Law School that took him to France and Germany. After he returned to Montevideo he was appointed professor of penal law and later professor of civil law at the university. He filled the latter for 23 years while also teaching courses in philosophy and industrial legislation. In 1908 he was appointed to a committee to study and formulate a national public assistance law and later served as director of the National Labor Office. He was later named Minister of Industry in 1915, during which time he did much to stimulate and develop national industry. He later headed the National Postal Savings Bureau, and for a time served as chairman of the Export and Import Control Commission. He was also president of the Athenaeum of Montevideo, a member of the Secondary Education Council, the National Public Assistance Board, and the Board for the Protection of Minors, and was also honorary director of the Law School Library and a member of the Governing Board of the Casa de Estudios (House of Studies). Amézaga also represented Uruguay at international conferences; serving in 1923 as a Uruguayan representative at the League of Nations in Geneva, and was a delegate to the Fourth, Fifth Sixth, and Seventh International Conferences of American States.

In 1932, on the occasion of the interdict between Argentina and Uruguay, Amézaga was appointed Extraordinary Ambassador, "crowning his mission with the most frank success." In addition to the aforementioned positions, by decree of the Ministry of Foreign Affairs he was appointed Delegate of Uruguay to the V. International Conference held in Santiago de Chile in 1923; Plenipotentiary Delegate to the Assembly of the Council of the League of Nations (IV. Session), by decree of the same Secretariat of State of July 6, 1928; Delegate of Uruguay to the VI and VII I-American Conferences, held in 1928 in Havana and in 1933 in Montevideo, respectively. Also, by decree of the Ministry of Foreign Affairs "he was appointed Delegate of Uruguay to the V. International Conference held in Santiago de Chile in 1923; Plenipotentiary Delegate to the Assembly of the Council of the League of Nations (IV. Session), by decree of the same Secretariat of State of July 6, 1928; Delegate of Uruguay to the VI and VII I-American Conferences, held in 1928 in Havana and in 1933 in Montevideo, respectively." In addition, he taught Civil Law courses at the Faculty of Law and Social Sciences until February 1933, when he resigned from that position.

Amézaga was involved in much legislation of a reformist nature, with one study noting that "As a deputy, he intervened, either as an author, as an informant member or in the discussions, in all the laws that were sanctioned from 1908 to 1914. He was the author, among others, of the following projects: old-age pensions, work accidents, free salary of the married woman, and the reorganization of the National Public Assistance, in collaboration, this last project with an extra-parliamentary Commission." He was also close to José Batlle y Ordóñez, serving as a deputy both in Batlle's second government and that of Claudio Williman. He later served as president of the State Insurance Bank from 1917 to 1933, resigning due to Gabriel Terra's coup.

Amézaga also played an important role in drafting a new constitution, when the question of constitutional reform was raised in Uruguay in 1942. Noting his contribution to this, Amézaga proclaimed in a 1943 speech that

I have actively collaborated in the preparation of the new constitutional texts that are beginning to govern us. I have confidence in them, as does the people who approved them with an overwhelming majority, considering them to be a faithful expression of the aspirations for justice and a sure guarantee of political freedom and individual rights. Time will rectify and perfect our work. The law is realized in stages, it is the fruit of a continuous and tireless struggle that in past times prohibited men from doing harm to their fellow men, which then forced them to give each one what legitimately belonged to him, and which in our time claims as a legal obligation what before was only advised as charity.

In addition, Amézaga came to be the head of the most lucrative law firm in Uruguay. In spite of his wealth and successes however, Amezaga was noted to be a humble man, with one observer noting how, during the 1942 election

When he went to cast his vote, some 20 people were in line ahead of him. He refused to be passed ahead, but awaited his turn. This agrees with the fundamental character of the man.

== President of Uruguay ==
=== Main features ===
He was President of Uruguay from 1943 to 1947. His rule is seen as significantly the first wholly constitutional presidency since the coup d'état carried out by Gabriel Terra in 1933.

Amézaga's vice president was Alberto Guani, who had already distinguished himself as a veteran diplomat. The veteran Socialist leader Emilio Frugoni was sent to Moscow by President Amézaga, as Uruguayan Ambassador.

Amézaga, along with the reform currents he represented, won a large majority in the 1942 Uruguayan general election. His election, according to one journal, "completed the democratic restoration and the definitive burial of "Marzismo", the regime that emerged around Gabriel Terra." According to one study, Amézaga took office in 1943 "with the challenge of running a transitional administration, suitable to conduct the country out of the authoritarian impasse and navigating the last years of the world war." Another study has argued that his presidency "represented in general a tranquillizing interval, threatening no expectations, endangering no established interest." His presidency was given the task of overseeing Uruguay's political transition and implementing a new constitution. To accomplish this Amézaga surrounded himself with ministers with political experience. He also formed his cabinet based on the part factions according to the results of the presidential election. Batllism gained the greatest cabinet representation with 7 ministers, followed by "Para servir al Pais" with 5 and "Libertad y Justicia" with 4.

According to one study, Amézaga began "with what has been characterized as a weak administration, so weak that only with great difficulty was it able to secure the adoption of his most important legislation." Amézaga was hampered internally by the Blanco Party's Nazi-influenced Herrerista wing and externally by intense Argentine political and economic pressure, and survived "due in no small part to U.S. Lend-Lease assistance and Export-Import Bank Loans." He also survived a right-wing plot against the government in July 1946.

A year earlier, in June 1945 the episode of the so-called "implications" occurred which, as summarised by one study, "exposed the way, in which the traditional political cast acted in the management of public administration. Many public men were accused of taking advantage of their positions to obtain "extra" benefits from their commercial and industrial activities through the exchange control. The denunciation was presented by the Herrerismo, trying to sharpen the differences between the colorados, and at the same time to stop his economic policy, which did not satisfy the cattle breeders. The issue provoked a temporary ministerial crisis, which was remedied with a new distribution of the cabinet: two ministries for men of confidence of the president, three for batllismo, two for blancocevedismo and two for independent nationalism. Finally, in December 1945, a resolution was passed in Parliament declaring that there had been no "illicit exercise of public office". The case was thus closed."

=== Social reforms ===
In spite of the difficulties Amézaga's government faced, his presidency was nevertheless notable for the passage of a wide range of reform measures. During his first year as president laws were passed establishing a social assistance fund to provide food for the unemployed and for pre-school and schoolchildren throughout the country, amending the law regulating home industries, organizing departmental labor distribution commissions, providing for aid to the unemployed via investment in extraordinary public works, regulating working conditions in the lumber industry, fixing minimum wages and working conditions in the construction industry, lowering rents for workers’ homes, and regulating working hours. Education budgets were also raised for normal and secondary schools, and measures adopted to help farmers affected by an unprecedented drought. This included creating arbitration and conciliation boards to solve the problem of farm rents, regulating the marketing of wheat, and providing for the acquisition of seed oats. There was also reform in the Ministry of Public Health, "all directed toward improvement in administration, more exacting standards for specialized positions, and an increase in health activities, especially in the interior of the country."

Act No. 10,421 of 16 April 1943 regulated working hours in banks and similar institutions. Special procedures for dealing with grievances over unjustified layoffs in the state were also set up during his presidency. Act No. 10,449 of 12 November 1943, as noted by one study, "defines the minimum wage, sets up a system of wage councils for its fixation and provides for family allowances. It protects wage earners and salaried employees in industry, commerce, private offices and the offices of public services not run by the State. The first part of the Act (sections 1-4) defines what is meant by the minimum wage, determines how it is to be calculated for piece work, specifies that payment shall be made in currency and prohibits the truck system. It makes employers responsible for the actions of agents and subcontractors in their service. The National Institute of Labour and Belated Services is empowered to represent the workers in making direct or indirect claims for the payment of wages due." This part of the Act "fixes the various penalties that may be inflicted upon those who infringe it and the procedure to be followed for the recovery of fines." The second part of the Act contained notes for setting up of wage councils to determine minimum wage rates for workers safeguarded by the Act. The third part of the Act introduced a mandatory system of equalisation funds for the payment of family allowances to all salaried employees and wage earners.

According to a presidential decree approved on the 28th of January 1944, laborers on public works projects “are henceforth to have the benefit of adequate and sanitary housing facilities whenever the construction projects on which they are working are located more than a mile and a quarter from the nearest town or city limits.” Act No. 10,471 of 3 March 1944 extended (as noted by one study) to workers "employed in the exploitation of forests, mountains and peateries the benefits of the laws on hours of work, weekly rest, wage councils and family allowances, and moreover establishes compulsory insurance against industrial accidents and occupational diseases, giving the Government and the State Insurance Bank the power to prohibit work, by force, if need be, when this obligation has not been met." Act No. 10,489 of 6 June 1944 "modified the standards for hours and rest periods for commercial establishments of a certain type which can interrupt their activities without inconvenience to the public." The Act also fixed "opening and closing hours for such establishments and provides that they may be open to the public from five minutes after their opening until ten minutes before their closing time; the staff may be required to work continuously, subject to the observance of specified rest periods." Additionally, the Act "forbids the working of more than eight hours on five days of the week and four hours on the sixth. The protection afforded by the Act is extended to the staff of such workshops as commercial establishments may possess on their own premises for the manufacture or finishing of goods for direct retail sale to the public. Such staff must be regarded as commercial employees and not as workers in industry." The same Act, together with its counterpart No. 10,542 of 20 October 1944, provided for dismissal compensation for all wage earners and salaried employees in commerce, private services, public services run by private individuals, and industry who do not work at piece rates, or for daily or hourly wages.

Law 10487 of May 1944 provided for the amount of the Public Works Debt 5% of 1942 to be increased by eight million pesos, with the increase in issuance that is authorized being allocated to various hospital works. Under Law 10495 of June 1944, “The workers and employees of businesses and annexes not included in decree-law number 9,347, of April 13, 1934, will enjoy the benefits and guarantees established in articles 3, 5, 6, and 7 of the law of June 1944. Law 10497 of June 1944 authorized the Executive Power “to acquire directly from the farmers and in the manner provided for in subparagraph E) of article 2, the amounts it deems necessary of corn from the present crop to the in order to avoid a drop in prices, maintaining a minimum price level that contemplates the interests of producers and consumers.” Under Law 10530 of September 1944 “The old-age pension benefit, established in article 1 of law number 6,874 of February 11, 1919 and number 7,880 of August 13, 1925, can be requested upon reaching 59 years of age, and will be settled without prejudice to the resolution final decision issued by the Institute from the date on which the interested party reaches the age of 60, provided that it has not been previously denied by verification, at the Institute's expense, of the petitioner's lack of rights.” In August 1944 10,000,000 pesos were authorized by the government for city and rural school building throughout Uruguay. Law 10511 of August 1944 authorized the Executive Power “to dispose of up to the amount of ten million pesos for the construction of buildings for the operation of urban and rural schools.” Law 10526 of September 1944 authorized the Executive Power “to allocate the equivalent of up to one hundred thousand dollars ($/a 100,000.00) as a contribution from the Ministry of Public Health to the "Pan American Cooperative Public Health Service", in accordance with the agreements entered into with the Office of the Coordinator of American Affairs.” These funds, as well as five hundred thousand dollars donated by the United States of North America, were to be used “in the preparation and beginning of execution of a Public Hygiene and Health plan in Uruguay, and its investment will be authorized, in each case, by the Ministry of Public Health.” Law 10,534 of October the 16th 1944, which had as its focus the living conditions of people in rural areas, authorized the Executive Branch (as noted by the text of this legislation) “in cases where it deems there to be a clear social interest, to acquire at public auction rural properties that are foreclosed upon due to non-payment of property taxes and additional taxes, within which shantytowns or population centers are located, and whose occupants are free of charge.”

To combat unemployment in the meat packing industry, the largest industry in Uruguay, Act No. 10,562 of 21 December 1944 established an Unemployment Fund and provided for the organisation of employment exchanges for the members of the Fund. The system of benefits established by the Act "guarantees a minimum of 100 hours of work per month per worker; if a worker is employed for less than this minimum, the Fund pays him benefit in respect of the hours not worked, in accordance with a special schedule. Workers protected by this Act cannot refuse without just cause to give their services when the establishment so requires, whether in their ordinary occupation or in any other activity." Under Law 10565 of December 1944, “Are included in the benefits granted by decree-law number 10,256 of October 21, 1942, retirees and their successors whose passivity has been granted prior to said decree-law -in their capacity as Teachers of the Deaf-Mute and mentally abnormal of the State schools - being able consequently to reform the respective certificates.” In addition, “The Teachers of the General Artigas National Institute for the Blind, as well as those already retired or their successors in title, will enjoy the benefits established in the previous article and in Law number 9,878 on retirement of private school teachers.”

Act No. 10,570 of 15 December 1944 regulated, as noted by one study,

the system of dismissal compensation for workers on piece rates or on daily or hourly wages and permanently employed in industry, who had been excepted from the general law. The compensation amounts to twenty-five days' pay for each year during which the worker has worked 240 days, subject to a maximum of three or six months' pay, depending on whether or not he is pensionable. Workers who have worked in the same establishment for less than 240 days but more than 100 days are entitled to two days' compensation for every twenty-five days of work. Here also, misconduct deprives the worker of his right to compensation." Workers in the meat packing industry who are members of its Unemployment Fund were subject to a special régime under Act No. 10,713 of 15 March 1946. If the Board of the Fund "considers the dismissal unfair, the worker may choose between compensation and the benefits paid by the Fund. Compensation is composed of two parts: one part is paid to the worker and is equal to two working days' pay for every twenty-five days or every month of permanent employment at the disposal of the Fund, up to a total of 75 or 150 working days' pay, according as he is entitled to pension or not; the other consists of the aggregate of the specified indemnities which the undertaking must pay to the Fund as fixed by the Board.

Law 10610 of April 1945 authorized the Executive Branch “to issue up to the sum of two million pesos ($2,000,000.00) in titles called "National Bonds for the Sanitation of Inland Cities" payable in twenty years, with an interest of five percent (5%) annual, payable quarterly in arrears.” The proceeds from the sale of these Bonds would be used exclusively to pay for internal sanitation works, connections with public sewers and external running water pipes, and for constructions located in cities or towns in the interior. A Decree concerning demolition dated 14 September 1945 "amends Section 70 of the accident prevention regulations of 22 January 1936. Before undertaking any excavation or demolition bordering on the public highway, permission must be obtained from the Directorate of Municipal Works. Neighbouring walls must be adequately shored, and precautions must be taken to prevent heavy falls of material from damaging adjacent buildings. Specified precautions must also be taken when lowering demolition material on to the public highway. As a general rule, buildings must be demolished storey by storey, beginning at the top. When necessary for the safety of the workers, platforms and scaffolds must be used. If other means of protection are not practicable, safety belts must be worn." A Decree respecting dough brakes dated 14 September 1945 "amends Section 19 of the accident prevention regulations of 22 January 1936. It fixes the position of the rolls in the machine, requires the lower roll to be fenced, and provides for the installation of a handwheel for separating the rolls, of hand and foot brakes, and of protection for gearing, belts and pulleys." A Decree prohibiting the employment of persons whose infirmities predispose them to accidents, dated 14 September 1945, prohibited the employment in any occupation of workers "who are clearly not in a normal physical or mental condition."

Law No. 10,694 of 1945 “increases the capital of the Rural Development and Colonization Section of the BHU, establishing regulations and creating special resources.” Under Act No. 10,681 of 10 December 1945, a similar unemployment benefit scheme to that for the meat packing industry was set up for workers in wool, leather, etc., depots and warehouses. Act No. 10,684 of 17 December 1945 established the right to 12 days of paid annual holiday "for all persons in the employment of private individuals or undertakings who have completed twelve months, twenty-four fortnights or fifty-two weeks of work, whether or not the employment has been continuous, and whether it has been with one or several employers; the right to the holiday depends solely on the time worked." The Act also provided that "on 1 January, 1 May and 25 August (the national holiday) of each year all wage earners shall be paid as though they had worked on these days; if they were in fact employed on any of these days, they mast receive double pay. The annual holiday thus in practice amounts to fifteen days."

In June 1946, a Horizontal Property Law was passed which, according to one study, “would generate a notable growth in the construction of collective housing for the rising middle classes.” Under Law 10838 of October 1946, the Honorary Commission for the Fight against Tuberculosis (which was previously established by law of January 17, 1946) “is hereby authorized to use up to 3% of its annual resources for the hiring of inspection personnel and Social Visitors.” Also in October 1946, an Agricultural Workers’ Code was enacted "to provide general coverage to rural workers on such matters as wages, housing, weekly rest and annual holidays, unfair dismissal, etc." Also, according to the law that provided for the establishment of this code, “The rural worker, in all trials that are processed related to compliance with this law, will enjoy the benefit of poverty relief.” The same law also provided for discharged rural workers over the age of 70 (or over 55 if female) to receive a monthly advance of up to 70% of the minimum retirement pension from the Social Insurance Bank, with money for this purpose to be provided by the employer beforehand. In addition, discharged rural workers had to be helped by the employer to move themselves, their families and their household effects, and if “the rural worker, or any member of his family, is sick, he is allowed to stay on the farm or establishment as long as necessary in order to avoid a risk to his health.” The rights of women were also advanced as a result of Law 10,783 of 1946, known as the Law of Civil Rights of Women. This abolished the legal incapacity of married women, while also equalizing the rights of fathers and mothers with respect to their minor children.

In a speech he made in 1946, Amézaga listed various laws that had been introduced, amended and passed. Amongst others, these included laws concerning employment offices for maritime workers, increased pay for pieceworkers, and reduced rents on rural land where there was hoof and mouth disease. In addition, various measures were adopted concerning public works and other subjects including a public health program, lowcost housing in Montevideo and Artigas, creation of a School of Library Science, establishment of a School of Liberal Arts and of an oceanographic and fishing service, and improvement of sanitation. A Permanent National Fund was also set up to assist in the fight against tuberculosis, which was exclusively aimed at providing social assistance pensions to the families of tubercular patients. In addition, an Honorary Commission was established “to function within the Ministry of Public Health, charged with studying, planning, and advising the Government on measures to combat the disease, organizing and directing a permanent census of tuberculosis sufferers in the country, preparing and disseminating campaign propaganda, and administering the Fund.”

=== International affairs ===
Amézaga's time in office saw a growing coolness towards Argentina (which changed following the overthrow of Juan Perón) and a closer association with the United States which, according to one study, “had been a traditional Colorado counterweight to British influence but was now more a function of the economic, political and military dominance of the United States in the region and Uruguay's briefly held ambition to take a prominent role in the inter-American system.” Government support was given for multi-lateral agreements on hemispheric defence sponsored by the United States in 1945 and at Rio de Janeiro in 1947. In 1946 commercial agreements were made with Belgium and France, a treaty of friendship was concluded with Russia, and new agreements regarding trade and payments were made with Great Britain.

Amézaga also spoke out against the horrors of the Second World War, stating in 1943 that

The current war represents one of the cruellest and bloodiest stages in the history of humanity in the fight for rights. Free men offer lives and assets to ward off the danger of the most atrocious and iniquitous of slavery. We are part of the rearguard of the immense army of humanity that defends itself in a fight of life or death for civilization and it is natural that we must stoically endure the sacrifices that common defense demands. Let us seek to achieve international peace by destroying those who violate the law at their roots, and let us not forget within our homeland that humanity cannot live in a society founded on injustice. Only through hypocrisy or timidity could we conceal the serious legal and moral deficiencies that affect the organization of contemporary democracies. It is not about dispossessing anyone, nor imposing solutions through violence, because the iniquities of dispossession, nor the arbitrariness, have never served to found anything solid. Let us contribute our help in the fight for the right that obliges us to help men and nations that need help. Let us do work of restorative and distributive justice. The horrors of external war have not reached our heads. Nobody thinks about civil wars or social demands through force."

Towards the end of the war, Amézaga led Uruguay (which had previously broken with the Axis in 1942) to declare war on the Axis powers on February the 21st 1945.

Amézaga's foreign minister Eduardo Rodriguez Larreta advocated “multilateral intervention” in the Americas as a way of preventing individual countries “from rejecting democratic institutions and jeopardizing hemispheric security.” In November 1945 Rodriquez sent a note to the other American governments. His proposal, referred to sometimes erroneously in English as the “Larreta” Doctrine, appealed for collective action to promote human rights and democracy and oppose dictators. While the plan was directed implicitly against Argentina, it was aimed broadly at general inter-American relations. In part of his note, Rodriguez asserted that “the purest respect for the principle of non-intervention of one State in the affairs of another (…) does not protect unlimitedly the notorious and repeated violation by any republic of elementary rights of man (…) In the international politics of America, the parallelism between peace and democracy should constitute an indeclinable norm of action.” His proposal was, however, rejected overwhelming by the American governments “on the grounds that such a course would be equivalent to authorizing unacceptable collective intervention,” therefore setting in, as noted by one study, “what they deemed its proper place the attempts at creating some sort of international supervision of the observance of human rights at a domestic level.”

=== Economic policies ===
During Amézaga's presidency, struggles between the different dominant factions and their respective country projects continued, but the crises that caused these contradictions were resolved in a less traumatic way. As noted by one study “This was fundamentally due to the favorable economic conditions created by the war, which allowed a greater margin of understanding. The increase in profits in the livestock sector, coming from a greater demand for meat and wool paid at better prices, generated in said sector, a more critical and more "understanding" attitude towards the industrialization policy promoted by the government.” The government took advantage of favorable international conditions created by the war, with Uruguay able to once again sell its products to the fighting nations of the United States and Europe, while control over exchange rates, exports and imports resulted in improved living standards for the popular sectors, increased importance of the industrial sector, and a sound trade balance. New mechanisms were established to restore the states role as arbiter in conflicts between employers and workers. Sectors of the labor force approved these measures, particularly the communists. A tax on all profits over 12% a year was also introduced, while public works were promoted. On 20 December 1944 the Uruguayan Congress approved a law authorizing the issuance of bonds to finance a 5-year public works program, with proceeds used for projects like reforestation and soil erosion control. The encouragement of public works enabled the government to significantly reduce unemployment, while also increasing the popularity of the public works minister Tomás Berreta, who would later succeed Amézaga as president. Berreta also attended particularly to, as noted by one study, "the interests of small agricultural producers in Canelones, a sector in which his political influence was considerable." Also significantly, starting in 1945 “the government promoted a policy of subsidies and credits for industry, which will boost production. Towards the end of the Amézaga government, the prospects for accelerated industrial development were clearly drawn on the country's economic horizon.”

Various measures were also adopted to reduce the cost of living. During Amézaga's first year in office there were "a great number of price-fixing and other regulatory measures, adopted to control the cost of living and the supply and distribution of articles of prime necessity." In 1945, the government contributed money towards lower consumer prices for articles of prime necessity such as meat, potatoes, bran, oats, corn, and wheat, while money was also contributed towards supporting popular dining rooms in the capital and provinces, and for winter social assistance and social security.

As noted by one study, Amézaga's presidency

took place in the midst of the favorable effects of the World War on the revitalization ofour exports. However, when it comes to industrial production, although the development process continued, it is recorded in these years a slowing down of its previous pace. Two factors seem to have influenced for this to occur: on the one hand, the difficulties in importing inputs caused by the war, and on the other, the regressive form of income distribution that had existed led to reducing domestic demand. It is in that direction then, that sectors of the industrial bourgeoisie fundamentally linked to the internal market, will play their card in favor of a change in redistributive policy through the unfreezing of social security policy and labor legislation with respect to the salaried sectors, with a view to strengthening the market and thus boosting industrial development and its profits.

=== 1947 ===
The year 1947 opened with Amézaga, younger by several years than his successor, preparing to step down as President in favour of his elected successor, Tomás Berreta, who was already aged in his 70s. Berreta's Presidency was to last barely 5 months, since he was to die in office.

== Literary works ==
In addition to his activities as a politician, Amézaga was the author of various published works on penal and civil law, one of which, De las Nulidades en General (On Nullities in General), won a prize offered by the Law School of his alma mater. Additionally, he wrote numerous articles for periodicals that dealt with labor, social welfare, and legal topics.

Among the works that Amézaga gave to publicity included “On teaching Criminal Law at the University of Montevideo. Explanation of reasons for a program of this subject. Prologue by Dr. Carlos M. de Pena” (1908), 1 foll. 41 pp; “Of nullities in general. (Thesis rated unanimously outstanding). Prologue by Dr. José A. de Freitas” (1909), 1 vol. from VII-262 pp.; “Aquilian guilt. Lessons from the Civil Law course” (1914), 1 vol. of 327 pp.; “Shorthand notes from the second course of Civil Law (1929), 2 vols. of 123 pp. and' 123 pp. and 126 pp.

Amézaga also published the following works in the “Journal of Law and Social Sciences”: “The simulation”, Volume I, Page 387; “Is the seizure of the debtor's rights and actions legal, decreed generically, when, having hidden his assets, an individualized seizure becomes impossible?” Volume 2, Page 12; Can the State modify, through an interpretive law, the clauses of a concession contract-law?, Idn., Pages. 225; “Insurance and legal measures for protection and safety against work accidents”, Volume 3, Page 438. In addition, the following works were published by the “Journal of Law, Jurisprudence and Administration”: “Project on the protection of minors” (In collaboration with Drs. G. Terra and E. J. Lagarmilla), Volume 11, Pages. 23 7 and following; “On obligations”, Volume 27, Page 425; “Contracts in which the wife and husband are bound together” (In collaboration with Dr. J. Irureta Goyena), Volume 32, Page 29 7; “Guidelines for the reform of the Uruguayan Civil Code”, Volume 32, Pages. 388 et seq.

== Post-presidency ==
Following the end of his presidency, Amézaga retired from politics. He died after a long illness in Montevideo on 20 August 1956, aged 75.

== See also ==
- Politics of Uruguay
- List of presidents of Uruguay

Political offices
Preceded by Alfredo Baldomir	President of Uruguay; 1943–1947	Succeeded by Tomás Berreta
