= César Charlone (politician) =

Uruguayan politician (1895–1973)

César Charlone Rodríguez
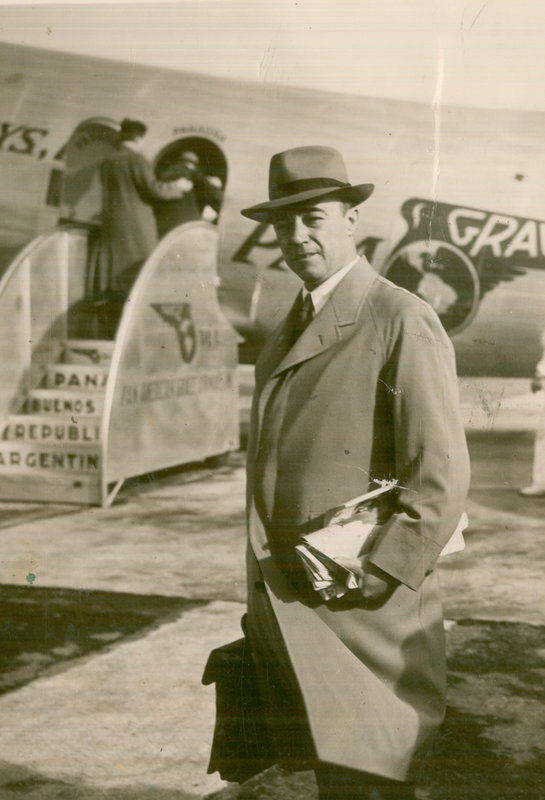

Minister of Foreign Affairs
- In office 12 August 1949 – 23 November 1950
- President: Luis Batlle Berres
- Preceded by: Daniel Castellanos
- Succeeded by: Alberto Domínguez Cámpora

2nd Vice President of Uruguay
- In office 19 June 1938 – 21 February 1942
- President: Alfredo Baldomir
- Preceded by: Alfredo Navarro
- Succeeded by: Alberto Guani

Personal details
- Born: 5 October 1895 Montevideo, Uruguay
- Died: 8 May 1973 (aged 77) Montevideo, Uruguay
- Party: Colorado Party
- Education: University of the Republic

César Charlone Rodríguez (5 October 1895 – 8 May 1973) was a Uruguayan lawyer and politician who served as the second Vice President of Uruguay from 1938 to 1942.

== Background ==
Charlone was prominent member of the Uruguayan Colorado Party during the 1930s. He was Minister of Finance from 1935 to 1938.

== Vice President of Uruguay ==
He was Vice President of Uruguay, and served from 1938 to 1942 under President Alfredo Baldomir. At the same time he was President of the Senate of Uruguay.

== Post Vice-Presidency ==
Charlone later served as Foreign Minister of Uruguay from 1949 until 1950 in the government of President of Uruguay Luis Batlle Berres.

He was Minister of Economy and Finance 1967–1971 in the Government of President of Uruguay Jorge Pacheco Areco.

He died on 8 May 1973, aged 77.

== See also ==
- Gabriel Terra
- Vice President of Uruguay
- Politics of Uruguay

Political offices
Preceded by Alfredo Navarro	Vice President of Uruguay; 1938-1943	Succeeded by Alberto Guani
