= Carlos Alberto Castellanos =

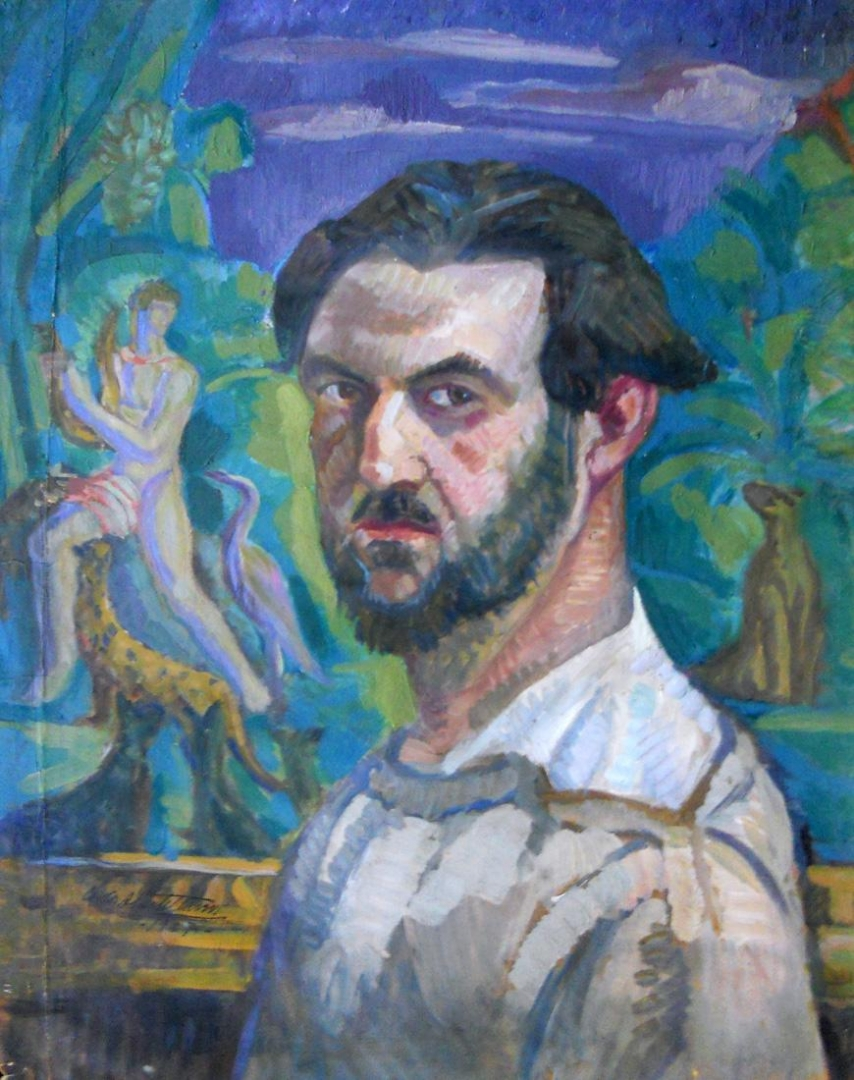
- self-portrait
- Born: 1881; Montevideo, Uruguay
- Died: 1945 (aged 63–64); Montevideo, Uruguay
- Education: Escuela de Artes y Oficios, Montevideo; Academia de Bellas Artes, Buenos Aires
- Known for: Painting, illustration
- Notable work: Decoration of the Uruguayan Pavilion at the 1937 International Exposition in Paris
- Movement: Academic art, modern Uruguayan painting

Carlos Alberto Castellanos (28 January 1881 – 26 October 1945) was a Uruguayan painter and illustrator recognised for his contributions to visual arts in early 20th-century Uruguay. His work reflects a synthesis of academic training and modern sensibility, and he is considered a key figure in the national artistic heritage.

== Early life and education ==
Castellanos was born on 28 January 1881 in Montevideo, Uruguay. He trained in Uruguay in the workshop of Carlos María Herrera and was active in the local art circles, including the Círculo (Círculo Fomento de Bellas Artes). Early in the 20th century he travelled in Europe to deepen his artistic formation.

== Career ==
Upon returning to Uruguay, Castellanos developed a prolific career as both a painter and an illustrator. He contributed illustrations to various periodicals and worked as an educator. In 1937 he decorated the Uruguayan Pavilion at the Exposition Internationale (Paris), receiving recognition for that work.
