= Alberto Guani =

Uruguayan politician

Alberto Guani Carrara
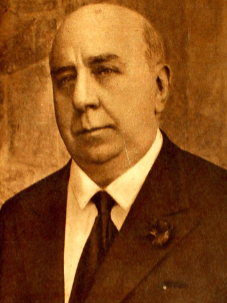
- Guani in 1942

3rd Vice President of Uruguay
- In office 1 March 1943 – 1 March 1947
- President: Juan José de Amézaga
- Preceded by: César Charlone
- Succeeded by: Luis Batlle Berres

Personal details
- Born: 14 June 1877 Montevideo, Uruguay
- Died: 26 November 1956 (aged 79) Montevideo, Uruguay
- Party: Colorado Party
- Profession: Jurist, Diplomat, Politician

Alberto Guani Carrara (14 June 1877 – 26 November 1956) was a Uruguayan jurist, diplomat and the Vice President and President of the Senate from 1943 to 1947.

Alberto Guani was born in Montevideo on 14 June 1877. He studied law, and became a well-known lawyer specializing in International Law. He studied law in Montevideo and, after obtaining a doctorate in law, he taught at the University of Montevideo. Early in his career Dr. Guani wrote about political and economic issues at El Siglo and El Tiempo newspapers, as well as writing for other publications. After becoming a lawyer, Dr. Guani partnered with Dr. Eduardo Acevedo and established his law firm, taking the first divorce cases in the country since divorce had just been legalised by the progressive José Batlle y Ordóñez presidency.

== Career ==
In Uruguayan politics, Guani was a member of the Colorado Party. As a member of the Colorado Party, Guani began his parliamentary career in 1907. He was elected as State Representative in 1907–1910 periods, and became a member of the Chamber of Deputies or State Representative equivalent throughout 1910.

Guani became the first Delegate of Uruguay to the League of Nations and was subsequently elected by his peers to the presidency of the Council Assembly in 1927. He was the first Uruguayan to dictate a course on International Law at the academy in The Hague. Earlier in 1920 when the nations of the world met at the San Remo Conference, the Uruguayan representative, Dr. Alberto Guani, expressed himself in favor of Jewish aspirations in Palestine and fervently supported the Balfour Declaration of November 2, 1917, milestone fundamental in the creation of the Israeli state.

Guani entered the diplomatic service, and served as Uruguay's Plenipotentiary Minister in Austria-Hungary and Switzerland (1911), in Belgium and the Netherlands (1913), in France (1925–1926), and in the United Kingdom (1936–1938). Additionally, he served as Uruguay's representative at the League of Nations.

Dr. Guani was appointed Foreign Minister by Alfredo Baldomir, and served in that office from 1938 to 1943. Guani fought against fascism at the Pan American Conference (1938), at the Third Consultation Meeting (1941), he established the basis for the fulfillment of inter-American military agreements, through the statutes declared on the "Guani Doctrine". Between 1939 and 1943 Guani was the Minister of Foreign Affairs. As Chancellor of the Republic of Uruguay during the presidency of Alfredo Baldomir, Guani was instrumental in the diplomatic battle that arose with the German battleship Graf Spee. The German battleship sought refuge at the shores of Uruguay in what came to be known as the Battle of the River Plate on Dec 13, 1939.

In the November 1942 elections, Guani was selected as the running-mate of Juan José de Amézaga when they won the primary of the Colorado Party. Duly elected, he was Uruguay's vice president from 1943 to 1947, succeeding Alfredo Navarro in that office. He was himself succeeded in 1947 by Luis Batlle Berres in the office of Vice President of Uruguay.

Guani was the author of several texts among them; The Italian Homeland and The Budget of the Republic and several important Conferences and Courses.

== Death and legacy ==
Alberto Guani died in Montevideo on November 26, 1956.

Guani was the third person to hold the office of Vice President of Uruguay. The office dates from 1934. Among the various holders of the historically intermittent office of Vice President of Uruguay, Guani arguably stands apart from most other holders in that he is chiefly remembered for his achievements (in his case, distinguished diplomacy) prior to taking the office. Unlike some other prominent office-holders, he has also relatively escaped criticism for having served the Administration of Gabriel Terra, who ruled by decree.

== In fiction ==
- In the 1956 film The Battle of the River Plate, directed by Powell and Pressburger, Guani was portrayed by Peter Illing.

== See also ==
- Politics of Uruguay
- Colorado Party (Uruguay)
- Vice President of Uruguay

Political offices
Preceded by Alfredo Navarro	Vice President of Uruguay; 1943–1947	Succeeded by Luis Batlle Berres
