= Alfredo Baldomir =

President of Uruguay (1884–1948)

Alfredo Baldomir Ferrari
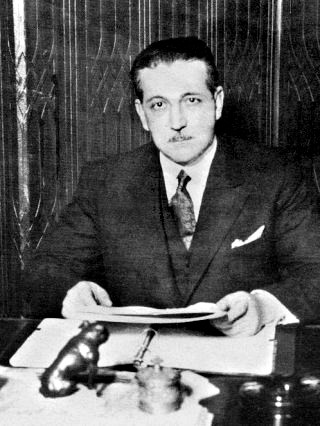

27th President of Uruguay
- In office 19 June 1938 – 1 March 1943
- Vice President: César Charlone
- Preceded by: Gabriel Terra
- Succeeded by: Juan José de Amézaga

Personal details
- Born: 27 August 1884 Paysandú, Uruguay
- Died: 25 February 1948 (aged 63)
- Party: Colorado Party
- Spouse: Sara Terra
- Education: University of the Republic, Uruguay
- Occupation: Politician, soldier, architect

Alfredo Baldomir Ferrari (August 27, 1884 – February 25, 1948) was a Uruguayan soldier, architect and politician. He served as President of Uruguay from 1938 to 1943.

== Background ==
Baldomir was born in Montevideo. He entered the Military Academy in 1900 after deciding to pursue a career in the military, but his fifth-year studies were interrupted by the 1904 revolution; during which he served in various military positions. He returned to the Military Academy following the end of hostilities, and became a fully commissioned officer in the army following his graduation. He later entered the School of Architecture; completing his studies there as well. He also served as an architect on the General Staff of the army from 1913 to 1919 and was appointed assistant chief of the bureau of military construction, where he contributed to the completion of various projects. He later became chief of the bureau; holding this position when Gabriel Terra became president. In March 1931 he was appointed chief of police of Montevideo, and in April 1934 was elected Second Vice President of the Republic. In September 1935 he accepted the portfolio of National Defense in the Cabinet; remaining in that post until he resigned to become a presidential candidate.

Baldomir also taught in the Military School and in the special School of Engineering. For fifteen years, he was professor of construction in the School of Architecture. He was also president of the Commission on Low-cost Housing, which was in charge of the building of homes for petty officials, salaried employees and laborers.

== President of Uruguay ==
He was elected President of Uruguay in 1938 as a member of the long-ruling Colorado Party. He took office as president on June 19, 1938; the Vice President of Uruguay during his period of Presidential office was Alfredo Navarro. Baldomir set a high priority in involving Uruguay in international affairs, and appointed the famous diplomat Alberto Guani as foreign minister.

Uruguay was formally neutral in World War II during his presidency, but in practice his government gave substantial support to the Allies. As World War II broke out (Baldomir was president during the Battle of the River Plate), Baldomir discouraged support for the Axis within the country, and early in 1942, he broke off diplomatic relations with the Axis Powers. In 1942, Baldomir, now a general in the army, expanded his powers through a military coup dissolving parliament and declaring an emergency. His term, which was soon to expire, was extended for a year. Soon a new Constitution came into force.

A wide range of reforms was also carried out during Baldomir's presidency. In terms of labor, regulations respecting safety in the construction of scaffolding were amended by a Decree of 7 September 1939, while a Decree of 19 October 1938, as noted by one study, "laid down, for the purposes of the application of labour legislation, a legal definition which finds its main criterion in the preponderance of intellectual or physical effort expended by the wage earner." An Act of September 1939 provided for the building of tax-exempt dwellings, while a law regulating homework was introduced in December 1939. Another law fixed minimum standards for work on rice plantations. In March 1939, health registers for workers were introduced, together with periodical medical examination in unhealthy trades, while a decree of August 1939 made it mandatory for employers "to provide special protective clothing for workers working in water." An Act of May the 15th 1939 provided (as noted by one study) “that workers in the building industry may in certain conditions obtain a loan equivalent to one month's wages, to be paid back in 20 monthly payments.” A resolution of January 1939 made provision "for instruction in industrial and social hygiene and the training of health visitors," while a decree issued in November 1939 dealt with safety in the use of grape pressing machines.

In regards to agriculture, a law of December 20, 1939 Law No. 9898 (Land for Farmers) authorized an expropriation in favor of evicted farmers, while Law No. 10,051 (on land division) of 1941, as noted by one study, established “a regime for expropriation, exploitation, etc., with the intervention of the BHU.” A law dated April the 5th 1941 also introduced special treatment for agricultural cooperatives.

Various reforms in social security were also carried out. Law 9940, passed in 1940, provided for the protection of (as noted by the text of the law) "public officials and their heirs by attributing to them the various benefits indicated therein." In 1939, unemployment compensation for shipwrecked sailors was introduced, and in 1940 survivors pensions for all civil servants were introduced, while in 1941 pension eligibility was extended to all military personnel. That same year a Notaries Public Pension Fund was set up organizing pensions for disability, survivors and retirement for professionals. The following year, domestic servants and other household employees came under the coverage of an Industry, Commerce and Public Utilities Pension fund. A Rural Workers Pension Fund was also set up to administer survivor's, disability and old-age pensions for those engaged in agricultural enterprises. A law introduced on January the 3rd 1941 made insurance against death, old age and invalidity mandatory for those working independently or for owners of businesses, while a law introduced on February the 28th 1941 increased workers’ compensation while also expanding the numbers covered.

In 1943, Baldomir voluntarily held elections and gave up power, but the continued dominance of the Colorados was ensured.

== Later life ==
Baldomir retired from presidency on 1 March 1943. He was the president of Banco de la República Oriental del Uruguay from 1943 to 1946.

In 1948 he died of an illness in Montevideo.

== Legacy ==
Baldomir's actions to identify Uruguay with the Allied cause in World War II have lessened his reputation as a controversial historical figure. It may be noted that he was a leading supporter of the previous President of Uruguay Gabriel Terra, who ruled by decree.

Nevertheless, Baldomir played a part in restoring democracy in Uruguay. While the Herrerista Blancos wished to maintain both authoritarianism and the 1934 constitution, Baldomir used America's entrance into the war following the attack on Pearl Harbor to break with this group and align Uruguay with the Allies. In 1942, he ended diplomatic ties with the Axis powers while separating himself politically from Luis Alberto de Herrera and instituting a self-coup to restore democracy and get rid of the 1934 constitution. These events became known as the "Good Coup," and were tacitly supported by the Batllista wing of the Colorado Party along with the United States. Uruguay's return to democracy would last until 1973 when a military dictatorship took control.

== See also ==
- Constitution of Uruguay of 1942
- Politics of Uruguay

Political offices
Preceded by Gabriel Terra	President of Uruguay; 1938–1943	Succeeded by Juan José de Amézaga
