= Alfredo Navarro =

Uruguayan politician (1868–1951)

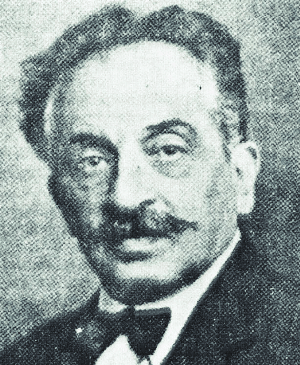

1st Vice President of Uruguay
- In office 18 May 1934 – 19 June 1938
- President: Gabriel Terra
- Preceded by: Office Established
- Succeeded by: César Charlone

Personal details
- Born: 4 May 1868 Montevideo, Uruguay
- Died: 17 May 1951 (aged 83) Montevideo, Uruguay
- Party: Colorado Party

Alfredo Navarro (4 May 1868 – 17 May 1951) was a Uruguayan political figure.

== Background ==
Navarro was a prominent member of the Colorado party in the 1930s.

He was a noted medical doctor.

== Vice President of Uruguay ==
Navarro served as Vice President of Uruguay 1934–1938, and also President of the Senate of Uruguay.

Navarro stepped down as Vice President in 1938, and was succeeded in that office by César Charlone.

=== Historical note ===
Navarro was the first person to hold the office of Vice President of Uruguay. The office dates from 1934.

== See also ==
- Vice President of Uruguay
- Gabriel Terra
- Politics of Uruguay

Political offices
Preceded by César Charlone	Vice President of Uruguay; 1938–1943	Succeeded by Alberto Guani
