= Gabriel Terra =

President of Uruguay (1873–1942)

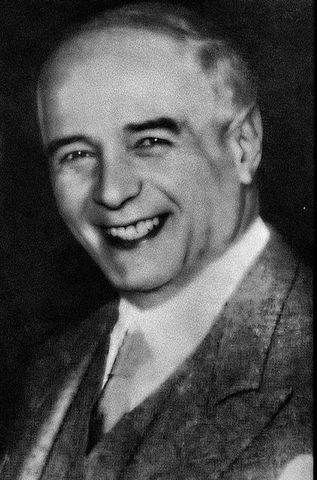
- Terra in 1934

President of Uruguay
- In office 18 May 1934 – 9 June 1938
- Succeeded by: Alfredo Baldomir

De facto President of Uruguay
- In office 31 March 1933 – 18 May 1934
- Preceded by: Himself as constitutional president
- Succeeded by: Himself as designated president

26th Constitutional President of Uruguay
- In office 1 March 1931 – 31 March 1933
- Preceded by: Juan Campisteguy
- Succeeded by: Himself as de facto president

Personal details
- Born: José Luis Gabriel Terra Leivas; 1 August 1873 Montevideo, Uruguay
- Died: 11 September 1942 (aged 69) Montevideo, Uruguay
- Party: Colorado Party
- Spouse: María Marcelina Ilarraz Miranda
- Children: 8
- Parents: José Ladislao Terra (father); Joaquina Leivas y Caballero (mother)
- Education: University of the Republic
- Occupation: Politician; jurist; professor

José Luis Gabriel Terra Leivas (1 August 1873 – 11 September 1942) was a Uruguayan lawyer and statesman who served as the 26th constitutional president of Uruguay from 1931 to 1933 and as dictator until 1938. He led a traditionalist and corporatist regime known as the March dictatorship, because the self-coup that he led took place on 31 March 1933.

While in power, Terra promoted the 1934 Constitution, which after being approved by the citizens through a nationwide referendum, officially abolished the collegiate executive established in 1917 and guaranteed rights such as gender equality and women's suffrage, as well as the legalization of homosexuality.

In 1938, he became president of the state-owned Banco de la República Oriental del Uruguay. That same year, he left the position due to a stroke, remaining paralyzed for four years until his death in near-extreme poverty on 15 September 1942.

== Life ==
Born in Montevideo, Gabriel Terra spent part of his childhood and adolescence on his father's (José Ladislao Terra) farm and studied Law at the Universidad de la República while also specializing in economic and financial science, graduating in 1895. He practiced as a lawyer and Justice of the Peace at the end of the 1890s and he was a professor at the Higher School of Commerce (known since 1935 as the Faculty of Economic Sciences and Administration) beginning in 1901. He was a national deputy from 1903 to 1907, minister of Industry, Labor and Public Instruction from 1907 to 1911. He founded the industrial oxygen production company CINOCA in 1908 and was a member of the National Constituent Assembly of 1917, Minister of the Interior from 1919 to 1921, and member of the National Council of Administration from 1926 to 1929. He was Constitutional President between 1931 and 1933, but became a de facto president from March 1933 to May 1934 after launching a self-coup. However, he once again became a de jure Constitutional President until June 1938. Terra was president of the Banco de la República Oriental del Uruguay in 1938. However, he suffered a stroke that same year, causing him to remain paralytic for four years until his death in 1942. Terra died in poverty, dying in an armchair on the early morning of 15 September 1942. At his funeral he received the corresponding state honors, and the country entered a mourning period. His remains were accompanied by hundreds of thousands of people along the procession. However, due to his presidency beng very controversial, his coffin was spat on by editors of the newspaper El Día, causing a fight to break out. The location of his grave is unknown.

Terra graduated as a lawyer in 1895 from the University of the Republic and had a lengthy political career, being a national deputy, he was deputy, minister of Industry, Work, and Public Instruction, a member of the 1917 Uruguayan Constituent Assembly, and member of the National Board of Directors. He was affiliated to the Colorado Party, although he was often independent of the dominant positions of its leader, José Batlle y Ordóñez. Terra advised all Uruguayan governments between 1904 and 1938.

== Political career ==
Graduated as a lawyer in 1895, he was deputy minister to the President Claudio Williman, member of the Constituent Assembly in 1917, Minister to the President Baltasar Brum and member of the National Board of Directors. He was an expert in economic and diplomatic issues, areas in which he advised all the Uruguayan governments between 1900 and 1938, he was a member of the Colorado Party, although many times independent of the dominant positions of its leader, José Batlle y Ordóñez.

In 1920, Terra presented a bill providing for the creation of a National Cooperative Institute. This formed, according to one study, "a type of consumer cooperative under public law, limited to State officials and supported by the Bank of the Republic." The scope of the initiative was expanded by the National Council of Administration to cover all the inhabitants of the Republic, and although it was sanctioned with modifications by the House of Representatives the initiative was detained in the Senate without ever obtaining approval.

His candidacy for the presidency in 1930 was opposed to the Luis Alberto de Herrera, leader of the National Party who obtained 47.26% of the votes cast, compared to 52.02% in favor of Terra.

On 13 February 1938, during a spontaneous congregation of workers to honor him in front of his house, in his last public speech to a popular crowd, he said:

"(...) since the first public days I have always been on the side of the underdog, on the side of the worker and the employee, who is also a worker. And I have shown throughout my public life, that if there is something What disgusts me is the man who accumulates wealth, call himself a merchant, call himself a rancher and does not know how to distribute part of that wealth among those who suffer. I respect the one who works and progresses, the one who with his honest effort is reciprocated by material power, but not respect to those who do not know how to obey feelings of human solidarity".

He had the longest uninterrupted tenure in office of any Uruguayan president, the only one to have three terms and the first to be re-elected. He presided over a constitutional government between 1931 and 1933, a dictatorial government from 1933 to 1934 and was re-elected by more than 60% of the electorate in 1934 for the period of 1934-1938. On 19 June 1938, his government ended, and he was appointed President of the Bank of the Oriental Republic of Uruguay. However, in the last months of 1938, his physical condition deteriorated when he suffered a cerebrovascular accident and was left paralytic until his death on 15 September 1942.

He died in poverty, left no economic inheritance, nor political-partisan inheritance, and his name is synonymous with repudiation in Uruguay.

== National Government (1931-1938) ==
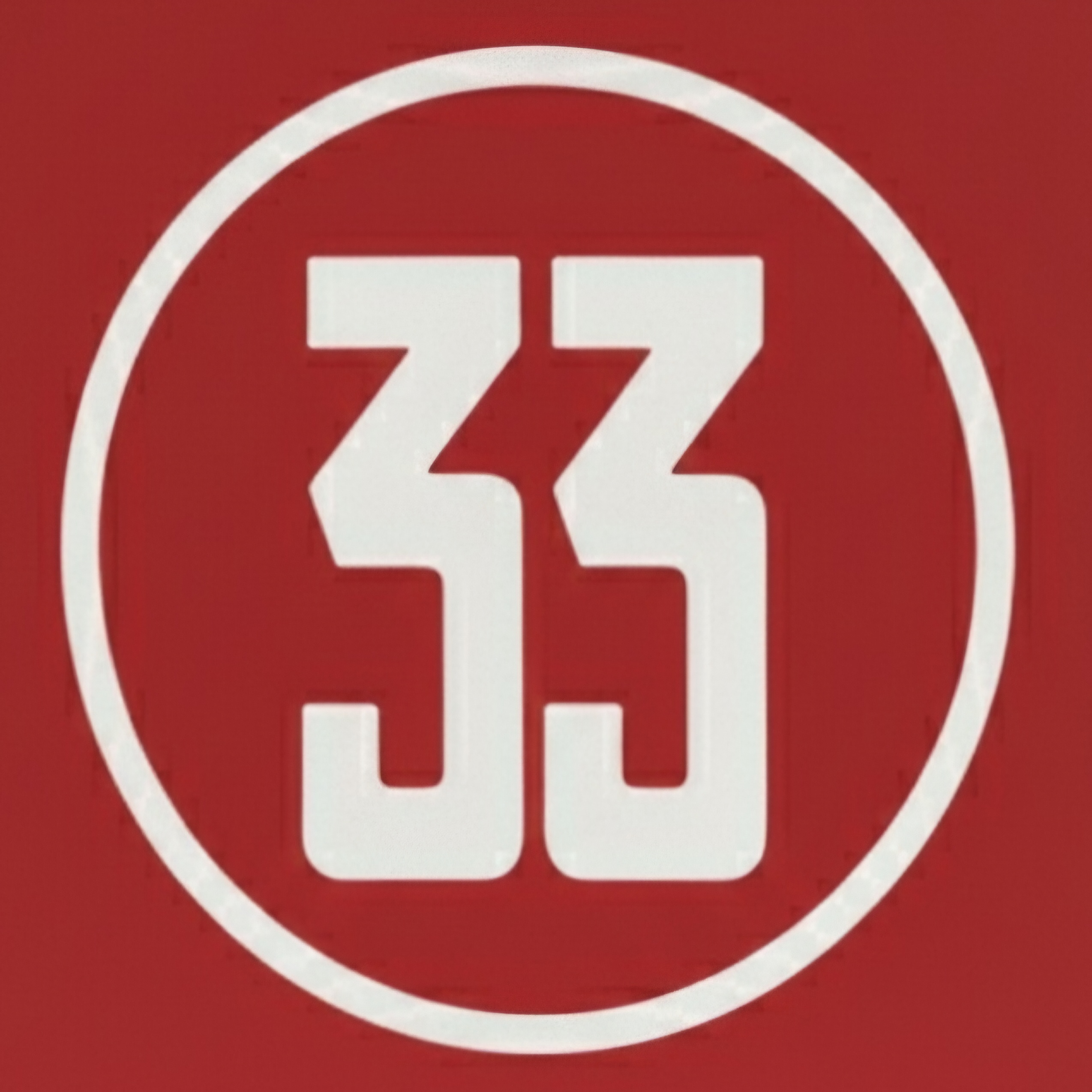
Flag used by Marzism (Sector of Gabriel Terra within the Colorado Party) in honor of the "Revolution of the Year 33," for the 1938 elections in Uruguay.

On 1 M. 1931, he assumed the Presidency of the Republic for the period 1931-1935. He opposed the Constitution of 1918 from the beginning, claiming that it was an unviable system that generated ungovernability. In 1932 the economic and political crisis worsened, so in November of that year he finally separated from the leading figures of Batllismo and began a tour of the interior of the country in favor of constitutional reform, instigating the mobilization of thousands of farmers through the center of Montevideo. On 1 April a "March on Montevideo" was organized, inspired by the March on Rome of Benito Mussolini, and the farmers paraded on Larrañaga Avenue to the "Centro Eúskaro" along with thousands of people, managing to unite the support of the rural sectors and independent revolutionaries.

On the night of 31 March 1933, with the support of the National Police, led by Baldomir Ferrari, the Armed Forces, more than 70% of the Batllismo with the former presidents Claudio Williman, José Serrato, Juan Campisteguy, the Vierismo, the Riverismo and the majority sector of the National Party, led by Luis Alberto de Herrera, carried out a coup d'état against the National Council of Administration, the Parliament and the Chamber of Senators. The period inaugurated by said coup is known as "Terra's dictatorship", named by the putschists as "Third Republic" or "March Government."

He established a progressive and anti-liberal government that was opposed by Batllismo, the Independent Whites (liberals), the Socialist Party of Uruguay and the Communist Party of Uruguay (Left). In 1934 he promulgated a new constitution, which was in full force until 1942. It restricted the immigration of "alcoholics, mentally ill and disabled", decriminalized homosexuality, recognized new rights that the State should guarantee, such as the right to strike, right to housing, right to work, right to health, right to food, protection of children and the family, equality between both sexes, Women's suffrage, an increased state control in the economy, with new sections and articles for the Autonomous Entities and Decentralized Services, the State control on trusted capitals and oligopolies and the prohibition of usury. He was elected Constitutional President again for the period 1934-1938, and held office until 19 June 1938.

== National policies and international relations ==
=== Industry, infrastructure and energy policies ===
During his mandate, an aggressive import substitution industrialization policy was developed: between 1933 and 1938 the industry grew by 160%, more than 14,500 new factories were founded, and important public works were carried out, such as a massive program of road construction and workers' housing through the Ministry of Public Works. In addition, the "National Institute of Affordable Housing" was created.

In 1937, works began for the Rincón del Bonete hydroelectric dam, a feat lauded by the IEEE. In 1938 a technical commission was established to plan the construction of the even bigger Salto Grande dam, and laid the groundwork for the construction of other hydroelectric projects, such as the Baygorria dam and the Palmar dam. These projects turned the country into the first modern nation to achieve total energetic self-sufficiency. In 1937 the government inaugurated the De La Teja refinery, in collaboration with the workers of the working class neighborhood of La Teja and state-owned energy company, ANCAP. On 31 March 1938, the National Laboratory of Electrical Magnitudes of State-Owned Telephones and Power Stations was opened.

=== Agricultural policies ===
Following up on the ideas he conceived throughout his political career, his government carried out programs for the modernization of agricultural production, the elimination of hunger, the subdivision of rural land, created the Ministry of Livestock, Agriculture and Fisheries, the "National Institute for the Scientific Feeding of the People", instituted the "Compulsory Cultivation Law", and the "Land Distribution Law", which granted to more than 2,000 poor families land and elements for agricultural production, among which more than 2,300 nationally manufactured tractors and plows. The law also granted these families tax and credit benefits. By 1937, agricultural production increased the cultivated area by 351,000 hectares and gave work to 31,000 more people than at the beginning of the dictatorship.

The institution of the family homestead was also introduced by an Act of May 1938.

=== Business, financial and fiscal policies ===
He made statements about Jews and international finance, in one of his long radio-conferences.

"The Jews in the face of this disastrous competition cannot satisfy their insatiable greed (...) the great weapon to combat it (usury), is to fortify the credit institutions, which, like the Banco de la República, carry to all areas of the country the free loan (without interest)."

The financial system was reformed through the approval of the "Revaluation Law", where the issuance of credit and the commercial activity of the banking was monopolized by the "Issuance Department" created in 1935, based on article 51 of the 1934 Constitution ("All types of usury are prohibited"). On 14 April 1933, debt collection was eliminated, benefiting especially small and medium-sized rural producers. The government also amortized debts, canceled the payment of 55,000,000 pesos of external credits and fixed all interest at 4% per year with Law 9,071. The government did not take on external credits, and in 1935 paid the debt with the United Kingdom, in 1936 with the United States and by 1938 it paid off all the external debt of Uruguay, which was in excess of 61,000,000 pesos incurred since the Great War in the 19th century, until 1933. Taxes were reduced, and all taxes on those who earned less than 100 pesos per month were abolished. Between 1934 and 1938 the administration saw significant surpluses, such as 9.65% in 1935. The value of the national currency was set by law. By 1937, the "Foreign Currency Fund" accrued over 30,000,000 pesos in foreign currencies, which were used to pay off the totality of the country's sovereign debt by 1938.

Between 1933 and 1937 there was a vast surge in markets of upwards of 80% due to commercial deals with countries such as Germany, Brasil, the Netherlands, Japan, Spain and Italy. However, the circulation of foreign currencies and merchandises within the country without official authorization was prohibited.

On 9 November 1934, by means of the decree of the 1st of August of the same year, was created the "Honorary Commission of Imports and Exchanges". The legislation also reformed, enlarged and solidified the delegated powers of the Bank of the Oriental Republic of Uruguay (the country's central bank) with regards to regulating commerce, the foreign currency exchange market, and the importation of foreign products.

=== Labor policies ===
In September 1933, the dictatorship established the National Institute of Labor and Annexed Services, in replacement of the National Bureau of Labor, while keeping its regulatory functions and the aim to enforce labor regulations.

During his very first speech after the coup, Terra declared on radio, on 8 April 1933:

« [... ] one of the greatest defects of the capitalist regime is the system of wage labor [...] which [must be made fair] to ensure that whoever contributes to the creation of wealth participate in the benefits kept by the businessman, be it the State or a private agent [...].»

An Act of 22 June 1931, as noted by one study, "prescribes Sunday closing for chemists' shops, with the exception of those opening on special duty from 8 a.m. to 10 p.m. Provision is also made for night work." A number of other reforms affecting working conditions were carried out during Terra's presidency.

=== Public health and social welfare policies ===
On January 11, 1934, the Public Health System was established by the decree-law 9,202, whose founding charter remains in validity to this day. During the same year, works on the Dr. Manuel Quintela Clinical Hospital started. Said building of more than 111,000 m^{2} in area became the largest hospital in the Americas and one of the largest and most modern in the world, and became a symbol for the country's advanced public health system. Other significant medical establishments built during this period include hospitals in Dolores, Rocha, San José and in Cardona, with expansions to the existing ones in Florida and Treinta y Tres. In 1937, construction began on new buildings for the Faculty of Chemistry and Pharmacy, the Faculty of Dentistry, and the Infectious Disease and Hygiene Institute.

In 1934, social security protection was provided to workers who were dismissed from employment in commerce and industry. That same year, a program of establishing low-cost restaurants where well-balanced meals could be served to workers at minimum prices was started. Such restaurants in 1937-38 served, according to one study, "within a single year more than 1,500,000 meals in Montevideo and more than 2,000,000 in other parts of Uruguay."

Certain pension and unemployment benefits were extended to additional groups, while a decree was issued which authorized the National Board of Fuel, Alcohol, and Portland Cement to provide its staff with family allowances from July 1938 onwards.

In 1933, the government established the gratuity of school canteens of the Ministry of Education and Culture in all public primary schools in the country.

=== Development of the national film industry for propaganda ===
The 1920's saw the appearance of a national amateur film industry. The dictatorship established two laboratories and three film studios under financing of the newly created Ministry of Education and Culture, which between 1933 and 1938 produced four films. The contents of the films produced by these state-backed studios aimed to legitimize the regime. The films saw a steady evolution in technique and quality, rapidly embracing new developments, like sound.

"Dos Destinos", produced in 1936, showcased the urbanistic advancements of the dictatorship, featuring the newly built parks, avenues, the construction of the prominent Avenida Agraciada, and symbols of state power like the headquarters of the state-owned energy company, ANCAP, and that of the state-owned national retirement depository. It also showcased the various road works and the modernization of the country's infrastructure, and backed a pro-rural, pro-military message, while condemning the alleged vices of urbanites and moneyed interests. The movie was presented as bearer of the "new expression of the Uruguayan soul", and the elaboration of elements like its soundtrack received ample government funding and support.

The second movie, preserved to this day, was "Vocación?" (1938), by Rina Massaedi. It was the first lyrical film in South America, and the first in Latin America to be directed by a woman. It exalts the virtues of an ideal rural lifestyle, as well as the gauchas (female counterparts to the gauchos, cowboys), and the overcoming of class divisions, while at the same time featuring racial prejudices. The ending exalts Christianity, as it involves a miracle by the Virgin Mary, with the protagonists submitting to the higher authority of Heaven. The movie has been used by some modern feminists as a symbol of female progress, but its origins in authoritarianism make it a controversial film.

==== Further uses of mass culture as propaganda ====
The Official Service of Electrical Radio Broadcasting, the national broadcasting service, became part of the Ministry of Education and Culture, which began to use to "spread and conserve" the national culture.

The government established the first national opera symphony band, as well as a national choir and ballet group. The first national opera production, titled "Nocturno Nativo" (Native Nocturnal), came out in 1936, and spread a message of social harmony (in accordance with the dictatorship's plan to present itself as the bringer of order to the country), as well as an assertion of national culture and the rural lifestyle.

==== International propaganda ====
In 1934, dictator Terra ordered the establishment of the National Tourism Commission, as well as the magazine "Tourism in Uruguay", which under the editorial leadership of the Ministry of Foreign Relations, as well as the aid of State resources and diffusion, presented a positive image of Uruguay and its ruling regime to the citizens of the world. Its prologue read that its goal was to "make known to the world and fellow countries the beauty of the nation".

For instance, a November 1936 issue showcases the Uruguayan youth, under the title "The road to physical perfection". The article follows the virtues of a number of perfectly disciplined and uniformed youths in a government youth camp. The teens are seen with a peak physique, joyous and in harmony with each other, their superiors, and their natural environment, and "in perfect synchronicity displayed the Hellenic ideal of human perfection". Other images shown include a group of 8 to 12 year old children, washing their teeth and smiling, "proving the health of the Uruguayan youth", thanks to the policies of the dictatorship. The text concludes with a statement exalting the "profound pride of the improvement of the race", attainable through "social equilibrium, order and discipline", guaranteed by the State.

== See also ==
- Constitution of Uruguay of 1934
- Politics of Uruguay
- List of political families#Uruguay

== Sources ==
- Geneall
- Jacob, Raúl (1983). El Uruguay de Terra, 1931-1938: una crónica del terrismo (in Spanish). Ediciones de la Banda Oriental.

Political offices
| Preceded by Juan Campisteguy | President of Uruguay; 1931–1938 | Succeeded by Alfredo Baldomir |
