= Classical Monetary System of the Oriental Republic of Uruguay =

Uruguayan monetary system, 1840–1855

The Classical Monetary System of the Oriental Republic of Uruguay includes the coins minted by the Oriental Republic of Uruguay between the years 1840 and 1855 in the national territory. These coins were minted entirely within the city of Montevideo, first at the "Taller y Armería Jouve" owned by a French artisan named Agustín Jouve and later at the Casa de Moneda de Montevideo (Montevideo Mint) or Casa de Moneda Nacional, which was created for this purpose.

This period in Uruguayan numismatics was immersed in a historical context full of economic problems, a non-existent currency, an economy practically in chaos and a civil war that lasted for years (the Great War).

In spite of these difficulties, several attempts were made to mint a coin that would bear national signs and would be able to put an end to the prevailing chaos, given that up to that moment the currency of all the different regimes that had exercised power in the territory had been in circulation: the Crown of Spain, the Crown of Portugal, the British Empire, the United Provinces of the Río de la Plata and, finally, the Empire of Brazil.

The first national coins were minted in 1839, in the workshop of the engraver Agustín Jouve, followed by the series minted in the Casa de Moneda de Montevideo until 1855, date from which the first coins were minted in foreign mints, thus culminating the classic period of Uruguayan numismatics. During this period magnificent coins were issued, among them the Peso del Sitio and the Sol de cabellera, all of which are currently museum pieces or are part of the most important collections in the country, each of them being highly coveted by collectors.

== Historical context ==
Since the birth of the new Republic, on August 27, 1828, there were several attempts to create a monetary system that would solve the problem of the circulating currencies in the territory and define a national monetary system with national signs. However, the economic difficulties of the time and the social situation of the new State made it almost impossible to install an economic-monetary policy that would put an end to the daily difficulties of commerce.

Once independence was achieved, the provisional government of General José Rondeau (October 4, 1828) did not take any monetary measure and allowed the circulation of all the currencies existing in the country at the date of assumption.

The first decisions regarding the monetary aspect were taken in 1829, year in which it was prohibited the introduction of all copper coins coming from abroad into the territory of the Republic. However, precious metal coins (gold and silver) continued to circulate until 1893 (accepted until then for their intrinsic value), when their circulation was definitively prohibited.

With the arrival of the first Constitutional President of the Republic, General Fructuoso Rivera, important measures continued to be taken, ordering in 1831 the withdrawal of all foreign copper currency. As a result of these measures, the city suffered a serious lack of foreign currency, so the government began to look for a quick solution to supply the needs of commerce. A solution to this situation was found by means of the law of March 14, 1831, which provided for the issuance of the currency known as "Tenths of the city of Buenos Aires" for half of its written value. These coins with a value of one tenth of a real were the first coins issued by the Oriental Republic of Uruguay.

These measures were not enough to alleviate the shortage situation, despite the fact that the number of coins issued was considerable (2 million), and led the Government to take new measures in 1839 by means of Law No. 208 of June 20. This law creates a new monetary system in which the Peso or Patacón is divided into 8 reales and each one of them into one hundred centésimos (a system that will last until 1862) and authorizes the issuance of coins of 5 and 20 centésimos (for an amount of $20,000). These coins will be the first to bear national signs.

=== The Great War ===
The Great War was one of the events that had the greatest impact on the issues, in this context the first minting attempts of the classic period were developed and had a notable impact, limiting and in many cases canceling the issues.

This conflict began in 1839 in Argentinean territory, and that confronted General Fructuoso Rivera and General Manuel Oribe, had moved since 1842 to the territory of the Republic. General Manuel Oribe burst into Uruguayan territory and reached the city of Montevideo, laying siege to the capital, which became known as the Siege of Montevideo.

Once this siege was installed, two governments were declared; on the one hand, the so-called Defense Government, led by Rivera and installed in the city (until May 13, 1843, when Joaquín Suárez took over as president), and the Cerrito Government, led by Oribe, who claimed the presidency in the Cerrito de la Victoria.

== First national minting ==
Although the law authorizing this minting dates back to 1839, the first works to carry it out date from May 8, 1840, date on which the engraver Agustín Jouve presents a proposal to the Executive Power to carry out this activity. The Executive Power quickly accepted the engraver's proposal, (Note: The original proposal is preserved in the National Archives) since it was very convenient for the State, which took place on May 9 of that same year. Immediately Agustín Jouve began the work but encountered many problems such as, for example, the shortage of copper and its high price in the market at the time. To solve the problem and start with the issue, the State agrees to a proposal from Jouve to indemnify him 32.5% over the costs agreed in the initial proposal.

In spite of this, only $500 were minted, which were delivered in two batches, one of $400 on October 3 and the other on October 7, 1840, in violation of the contract that established an amount of $20,000. These coins were quickly put into circulation by the government on October 15, 1840. This date was declared "National Numismatic Day" in 1990 by decision of the Executive Power to remember this important event in the history of Uruguay.

These works were carried out in a small workshop owned by Jouve, which was called "Taller y Armería Jouve" and was located at 300 25 de Mayo Street. (Note: The original address was determined by the numismatist Hugo Mancebo, Monedas, papel moneda y medallas del Uruguay, page 3.)

=== Characteristics of the minted pieces (5 and 20 cent. of 1840) ===
Minting in 1840
Image		Value	Characteristics							
Front	Back	Value	Law	Legal weight	Real weight	Metal	Module	Edge	Engraver	Amount minted
		5 cent.	Law N.° 208 of June 20, 1839	7,1 g	5,3 - 5,3 grams	Copper	24 mm	Smooth	Agustín Jouve	6.000 (approx.)
		20 cent.	Law N.° 208 of June 20, 1839	28,7 g	26,5 - 27,8 grams	Copper	37 mm	Smooth	Agustín Jouve	18.500 (approx.)

- The 5 cent. coin was popularly known as "cinquiño", coming from the Portuguese term Cinquinho, which corresponded to a silver coin of King Manuel of Portugal with a value of 5 reis.

== Casa de Moneda de Montevideo ==
The Casa de Moneda de Montevideo or Casa de Moneda Nacional was the institution in charge of the official issuance of coins in the Oriental Republic of Uruguay from 1843 to 1855, although the activity was interrupted on several occasions.

It was created in order to comply with Laws No. 254 and No. 255 of December 13, 1843, which empowered the Government to issue coins of 5, 20 and 40 hundredths of real (copper) and Half and One Peso Fuerte (silver).

The same day these laws were enacted, the first tests were carried out, minting coins of 20 hundredths of a real. In spite of this, the institution was officially inaugurated on February 2, 1844, by the then Political and Police Chief of Montevideo, Andrés Lamas, installing itself in a small workshop in the building of the Police Headquarters of the city called Casa Central de Policía.

=== First period of issues by the Casa de Monedas ===
There are two distinct stages in the first period of the Casa de Moneda de Montevideo, which are detailed below.

=== First stage ===
This stage began with the minting of a 20 centésimos coin on the afternoon of December 13 and lasted until mid-March 1844, when the Mint suspended its activities. During this period the institution depended on the Political Chief of the city of Montevideo and its director was Don Domingo Parpal and minted coins of 20 centésimos of 1843, 5, 20 and 40 centésimos of 1844 in addition to the magnificent piece of the Peso Fuerte or Peso del Sitio. All these pieces were made in the workshop located in the "Casa Central de Policía".

==== First issue (20 cent 1843) ====
Immediately after the promulgation of Law No. 254 of December 13, 1843, the first trials were carried out by issuing 20 cent coins with the same stamps used by Agustín Jouve in 1839, with the date changed from 1840 to 1843. The characteristic of these pieces is that since the date was modified, the number 3 appears forced. These pieces are the first issued by the Casa de Moneda Nacional.

20 cents of 1843
Image		Valoe	Characteristics							
Front	Back	Valoe	Law	Legal weight	Real weight	Metal	Module	Edge	Engraver	Amount minted
		20 cent.	N.° 254 of the day December 13, 1843.	21,5 grams	20 - 24,9 grams	Copper	37 mm	Smooth	Agustín Jouve (adapted stamps)	15.000 (approx.)

- This coin was known by the name of "Vintén" which comes from the Portuguese expression "Vintem" which corresponds to a coin with the value of 20 réis of copper.

==== Issue 5, 20, 40 cents of 1844 ====
They were issued throughout the first stage of the Mint. They were pieces that contributed to give solidity to the development of commerce and helped to put an end to the great shortage of circulating currency that existed in the new Republic.

Minting in 1844
Image		Value	Characteristics							
Front	Back	Value	Law	Legal weight	Real weight	Metal	Module	Edge	Engraver	Amount minted
		5 cent.	N.° 254 of the day December 13, 1843.	5,38 grams	5,4 - 5,7 grams	Copper	24 mm	Smooth	Agustín Jouve	6.000 (approx.)
		20 cent.	N.° 254 of the day December 13, 1843.	21,5 grams	21 grams	Copper	38 mm	Smooth	Agustín Jouve	10.000 (approx.)
		40 cent.	N.° 254 of the day December 13, 1843.	43 grams	36 - 42 grams	Copper	38 – 42 mm	Smooth	Agustín Jouve	65.000 (approx.)

- Five different mintages are known for the 5 cent. piece.
- The 40 cent. coin was the only one minted at the Mint with this value. For its minting, a number of stamps were used that have not yet been accurately determined, so that more than 20 variants of this piece are known.

One of these variants is known as the "Sol de Cabellera", since on the obverse the face of the sun corresponds to a native with long hair. Due to its great relief, it is very rare to find specimens in good condition, which makes it a very coveted piece by collectors.

==== Peso del Sitio or Peso Fuerte ====
This piece is the only silver coin to be minted at the Casa de Moneda de Montevideo. This minting was carried out in an extremely reduced number (a little more than 1,000) due to the scarcity of materials. This shortage of materials (caused by the Siege of Montevideo) could be overcome because materials were collected inside the besieged square. Mates, spoons, light bulbs, spurs, etc., all made of silver, were collected from the citizens, among them Andrés Lamas himself or personalities such as Giuseppe Garibaldi or Isidoro de María. The collected silver, naturally impure, product of the different qualities of silver collected, was analyzed by the expert chemist Professor Julio Antonio Lenoble, who classified the material with a fine 10 1/2 dineros (0.875).

==== Characteristics of the Peso del Sitio ====
Peso del Sitio o Peso Fuerte
Image		Value	Characteristics							
Front	Back	Value	Law	Legal weight	Real weight	Metal	Module	Edge	Engraver	Amount minted
		1 peso.	N.° 254 of December 13, 1843.	27 grams	27 grams	Silver, fine 10 1/2 (dinero)	39 mm	Cordoncillo	Agustín Jouve	1.000 (approx.)

- Some pieces minted on coins from other countries are known.
- This piece would circulate only in Montevideo since on February 15, 1844, from his headquarters in the Cerrito de la Victoria, General Manuel Oribe (Chief of the forces that besieged Montevideo) prohibits the circulation throughout the territory of the Republic.

It is, without a doubt, one of the most beautiful coins of the Classical Monetary. It was minted with similar characteristics to those of a Spanish peso. It is believed that it was minted more as a commemorative element than for circulation. This idea is based on the good condition in which the specimens have arrived to our time (although some specimens undoubtedly circulated). The following is a small passage from a speech made by Andrés Lamas to the President of the Republic, Joaquín Suárez, on the occasion of the inauguration of the Casa de Moneda Nacional.

YOUR EXCELLENCY. Sir: I have the honor to present to Your Excellency the first silver coin destined for circulation, minted at the Casa de Moneda Nacional. This coin, Mr. President, is monumental, and this monument is unique to this day on the eastern and western banks of the Rio de la Plata. This coin is the most finished symbol, Mr. President, of the National Independence. In all times and in the public law of all nations, the minting of coins has been the highest prerogative of the Independent Empire.

=== Second stage ===
The Casa de Moneda Nacional, once out of operation, continued to depend on the Political Chief of the city of Montevideo, until May 27, 1844, when it became dependent on the Ministry of Finance (a position held by Andres Lamas). On September 20, 1844, Andrés Lamas resigned from the Ministry of Finance due to a series of denunciations he received for irregularities committed in the Casa de Monedas. At the head of this ministry would now be Don Santiago Sayago who would order on October 20 the opening of the mint designating Don Juan de Bernade y Mederos as General Director.

The existing stamps were immediately inspected and found to be in very poor condition, so the Director obtained authorization to have new ones engraved. During this period only 40 cent coins were issued with a date of 1844 (as was seen previously in issue 40 cent of 1844). This stage of the Casa de Monedas lasted until mid-January 1845, when it was definitively closed and the materials of Agustín Jouve used up to that time were returned.

=== Second period of issues by the Casa de Monedas ===
In 1854 the National Mint was again established (but this time in the Government Fort) and Don Juan Gard was appointed as Director, with Don Agustín Rivero as engraver and Don Francisco Didión as assayer. On June 24, 1854, Laws No. 414 and 418 were enacted authorizing the minting of gold coins of 10, 20 and 40 reales together with coins of 5, 20 and 40 hundredths of copper. The minting in gold was never carried out, while in copper only coins of 5 and 20 centésimos were issued, bearing the years 1854 and 1855.

==== Issue 5 and 20 cent. of 1854 ====
Minting in 1854
Image		Value	Characteristics							
Front	Back	Value	Law	Legal weight	Real weight	Metal	Module	Edge	Engraver	Amount minted
		5 cent.	N.° 418 of the day July 24, 1854.	5,38 grams	5,2 grams	Copper	24 mm	Smooth	Agustín Rivero	120.000 (approx.)
		20 cent.	N.° 418 of the day July 24, 1854.	21,5 grams	19,5 - 21,5 grams	Copper	38 mm	Smooth	Agustín Rivero	50.000 (approx.)

- The 5 cent. piece has the peculiarity that the front shows the number 4 of the year 1854 "Forced", this would lead to the conclusion that the stamps used in 1840 or 1844 were used, but these do not have the same characteristics, being then a mystery this detail.
- Pieces of 20 cents with date 1854 were minted in 1855 once the production of these last ones was finished, being identical to the ones stamped in the previous year.

==== Issue 5 and 20 cent. of 1855 ====
Minting in 1855
Image		Value	Characteristics							
Front	Back	Value	Law	Legal weight	Real weight	Metal	Module	Edge	Engraver	Amount minted
		5 cent.	Law N.° 418 of July 24, 1854	5,38 grams	5,2 - 5,4 grams	Copper	24 mm	Smooth	Agustín Rivero	8.000 (approx.)
		20 cent.	Law N.° 418 of July 24, 1854	21,5 grams	20 - 21 grams	Copper	38 mm	Smooth	Agustín Rivero	30.000 (approx.)

== Assays and mintmark ==
None of the coins minted in the Classical Period bear a mark that identifies their mint (mint mark). Only one assay minted for a value of 40 reales in 1854, on the reverse of which there is the imprint of an Mº that would identify the Casa de Moneda de Montevideo. The assays made in this mint are detailed below.

=== 1840, 5 cents ===
There are very few known copies of this piece, in which the coin blanks used for its minting are thicker than the rest and its weight is very close to the legal weight. This is why some numismatists maintain (based on the few copies) that it is an assay, while others (based on the weight of the piece) maintain that it is one of the first minted and that the coin blanks were reduced to economize its production.

=== 1843, 20 cents ===
There is only one specimen in the National Historical Museum, stamped in lead, which corresponds to the first proof of the 20 cent coin issued on the afternoon of December 13, 1843.

=== 1854, 40 reales ===
Law Nº 414 of June 24, 1854 established the minting of gold coins of 40 reales (in addition to 10 and 20 reales), which was never carried out. However, very few of these coins were minted, with a module of 22 mm and a weight of 7 grams. These are the only pieces to bear the mint mark (Mº).

== End of the classical period ==
The classic period culminated with the definitive closing of the Casa de Moneda de Montevideo, which took place at the beginning of the second half of 1855, and from then on, all Uruguayan coins were minted in foreign mints. During this period, 328,500 copper pieces were minted and only 1,000 silver pieces corresponding to the Peso de Sitio were minted; no gold coins were minted. Of this number of pieces, only a very small number have been minted up to the 21st century, and in the case of some variants, only one specimen is known, making them the most coveted coins of the Uruguayan monetary system, not only because of their scarcity, but also because of their great historical value.

== See also ==
- Currency
- Coin
- Uruguayan peso

== Bibliography ==
- Silvera Antúnez, Marcos (2002). Catálogo de Monedas del Uruguay 1831-2002 (in Spanish). Montevideo: Ediciones el Galeón.
- Araújo Villagrán, Ernesto (1959). La Patria a través de las monedas (in Spanish). Montevideo: Impresora Uruguaya SA.
- Mancebo, Hugo; Silvera Antúnez, Marcos (1993). Monedas, papel moneda y medallas del Uruguay (in Spanish). Montevideo: Ediciones el Galeón.
- Silvera Antúnez, Marcos (1990). La historia de la Patria a través de las monedas. El monetario clásico (in Spanish). Montevideo: Ediciones el Galeón.
