= Melchor Pacheco y Obes =

Uruguayan politician (1809–1855)

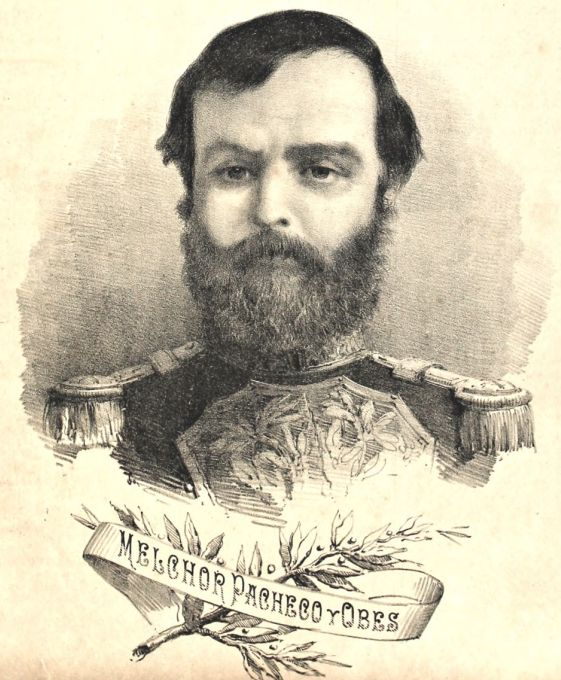
- Born: 20 January 1809; Buenos Aires, Viceroyalty of the Río de la Plata
- Died: 21 May 1855 (aged 46) Buenos Aires, Argentina
- Allegiance: Uruguay
- Branch: (Uruguay) Uruguayan Army
- Rank: General
- Conflicts: Cisplatine War: Battle of Ituzaingó; Uruguayan Civil War: Great Siege of Montevideo; Platine War
- Spouses: Manuela Texera; Matilde Stewart Aguell

Melchor Pacheco y Obes (20 January 1809 - 21 May 1855) was a military officer and politician with outstanding activity in what is now present-day Uruguay. He was a member of the Colorado Party and was one of the fundamental men of the Gobierno de la Defensa in Montevideo, during the Uruguayan Civil War.

== Biography ==
=== Early life ===
Pacheco was the son of the captain of blandengues Jorge Pacheco and Dionisia Obes y Álvarez. He was educated in Buenos Aires and Rio de Janeiro, where he lived for a time with his uncle Lucas Jorge Obes. At the beginning of the Cruzada Libertadora in 1825 - a revolt against Brazilian domination of the Banda Oriental - the young Melchor, aged 16, joined the rebel troops of Julián Laguna in Mercedes, who appointed him his secretary. He fought against Brazil and participated in the battle of Ituzaingó (February 1827). He later returned to Buenos Aires, but soon after he permanently settled in Montevideo. Despite his friendship with Juan Antonio Lavalleja, he did not accompany him in his revolutionary adventure in 1832 against the presidency of Fructuoso Rivera and fought him under the orders of José María Raña. He stayed out of Rivera's uprising against President Manuel Oribe in 1836-1838.

=== Uruguayan civil war and Platine war ===
When Rivera was proclaimed president for the second time in February 1839 and declared war on the government of Buenos Aires, Pacheco joined the forces commanded by Rufino Bauzá. At that time the Uruguayan Civil War (1839-1851) began, he rapidly rose through the ranks thanks to his education and his leadership skills, and in 1841 he reached the rank of lieutenant colonel.

Rivera, who at that time had great appreciation for him, appointed him as second political chief of Soriano. After the battle of Arroyo Grande (December 1842), he left his office and joined Rivera's army, which was returning after being defeated; the president made him Minister of War and Navy. Besieged by Oribe since 1842, Pacheco began to carve out his legendary prestige. He revealed himself as an extraordinary organizer: he kept General José María Paz in Montevideo, whom he appointed General Commander of Arms; he reorganized the military corps, was in charge of the reconstruction and extension of the fortifications and became the bastion of the resistance. He was a participant in the battles of Cerro and Pantanoso and his prestige grew dramatically, undoubtedly helped by his family ties with Manuel Herrera y Obes, his first cousin. In 1844 he resigned from the Ministry, after a conflict with the government, and was deported to Rio de Janeiro along with his cousin Manuel. He lived there for a year with difficulties, but in 1845 he was called by the President of the Gobierno de la Defensa, Joaquín Suárez, who promoted him to general and entrusted him with total command of the besieged troops.

In February 1846 he was appointed to the Assembly of Notables that officiated together with the Council of State as the Legislative Power.

Disagreeing with the situation created by Rivera's reappearance that year, which culminated in a military mutiny, he resigned from his positions on April 2 and took refuge on a French ship that took him back to Rio de Janeiro. In 1849 Manuel Herrera y Obes appointed him plenipotentiary minister in France; the almost desperate aim was to convince the French government not to withdraw support for the defense cause. Pacheco was received by the French Parliament, before which he delivered a brilliant plea - in fluent French and with unusual energy - in which judgments for the adversaries of his cause were not lacking. At a certain point in his speech he saw that some deputies were talking and laughing, he then addressed them, reproaching them for their discourtesy and their indifference to the drama of other peoples: "In our wars we die, gentlemen. Is it that something else happens in yours?". Despite making an excellent impression, he did not get any concrete help. He was linked with intellectual sectors that carried out strong propaganda in favor of the defense cause in the distant and exotic Río de la Plata. His friendship with the famous writer Alejandro Dumas (father) led to the appearance of a booklet entitled Montevideo or the new Troy; it is a general assumption that Pacheco y Obes wrote it and Dumas only signed it. Once signed the peace of October 1851, which ended the Uruguayan Civil War, he returned to Uruguay. Not without first making a stop in Rio de Janeiro and having a cordial interview with Rivera.

=== The conservatives and Pacheco's Mutiny ===
In Montevideo, he joined the Colorado conservative sector and took responsibility for the mutiny of 18 July 1853. When the unexpected confrontation broke out between the National Guard (mostly from the Blanco party, and it is said, unarmed) and the 2nd Battalion of Hunters Led by the Spanish mercenary León de Pallejas, promoter of the coup, Melchor Pacheco appeared before President Juan Francisco Giró, who was in a meeting with the diplomatic corps, and told him that a riot had broken out that he personally disapproved of, but that he had obligations that he could not ignore with his comrades in arms, whom he was going to join in trying to restore order. It was a coup with friendly forms that began to gestate the overthrow of Giró, and surely it was the same Melchor Pacheco y Obes who started the mutiny, for that reason and for seeking conciliations between the blancos and the colorados at the time, the mutiny was named by the Uruguayan histography as "El Motín de Pacheco". After the mutiny, the President agreed to appoint two colorado ministers, a requirement of the "conservatives", Juan Francisco Giró put Manuel Herrera and Obes in the Ministry of Finance and Venancio Flores in the Ministry of War and Navy as it had been requested. On September 24, however, after Flores in turn required the appointment of three colorado political leaders, Giró resigned and took asylum in the French embassy. By then Pacheco had adopted a clearly subversive position. He was one of the main promoters of the constitution of the Triumvirate that succeeded Giró and was awarded the position of Chief of the Army General Staff, which put military power in his hands.

=== Final years ===
His award was of little value due to the growing influence of the caudillo Flores, who after the death of Lavalleja and Rivera was in charge of the Executive Power. Pacheco did not reach an understanding with the new president and resigned. He directed the newspaper El Nacional for a few months, but in May 1854 he left the country and settled in Buenos Aires. He died on 21 May 1855 and was buried in Montevideo and his remains are in the National Pantheon. Pacheco y Obes, whom José E. Rodó considered the most fascinating figure in Uruguayan history, was a military man who stood out more as an organizer, speaker and journalist than as a soldier. He married twice, first with Manuela Texera (from whom he had a son named Máximo) and after being widowed, he married Matilde Stewart Aguell, Duncan Stewart's sister, with whom he had no descendants.
