= Emilio Mitre =

Argentine General (1824–1893

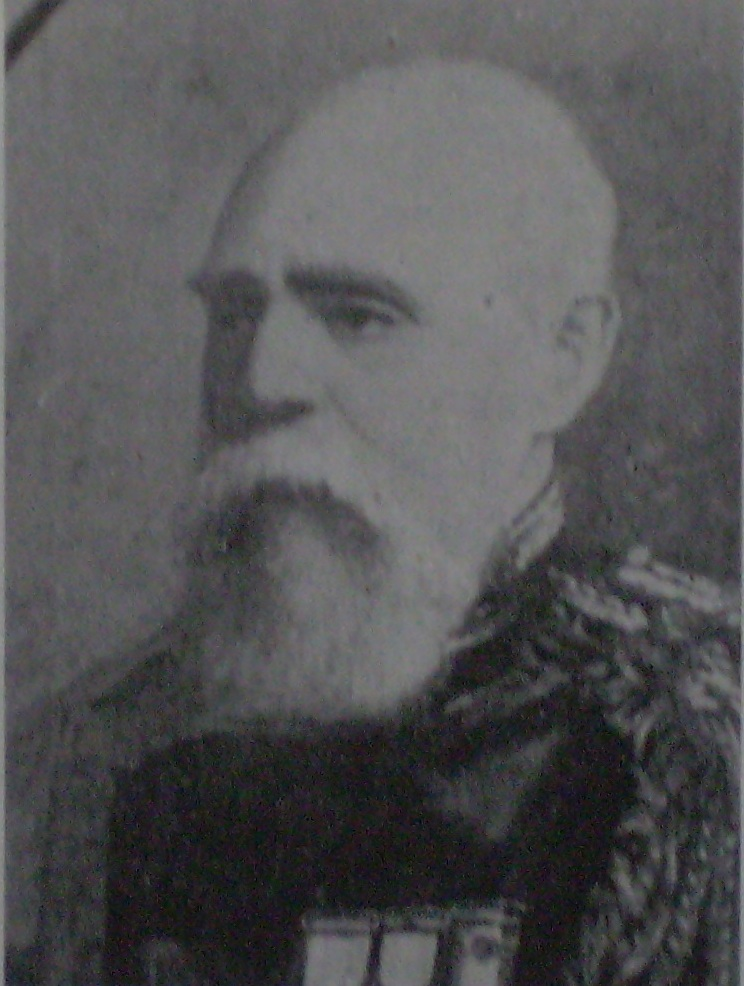
- Born: January 5, 1824; Carmen de Patagones, Buenos Aires, Argentine Confederation
- Died: December 24, 1893 (aged 69); Buenos Aires, Argentina
- Relatives: Bartolomé Mitre (Brother)
- Military career
- Allegiance: Uruguay; State of Buenos Aires; Argentina
- Branch: National Army of Uruguay; Argentine Army
- Service years: 1841 – 1893
- Rank: Lieutenant General
- Conflicts: Uruguayan Civil War; Battle of Arroyo Grande; Battle of Caseros; War between the Argentine Confederation and the state of Buenos Aires; Battle of Cepeda; Battle of Pavón; Paraguayan War; Humaitá campaign; Battle of Boquerón; Revolution of 1874 Revolution of the Park

Emilio Mitre (5 January 1824, Carmen de Patagones – 24 December 1893) was an Argentine Lieutenant General who participated in the Paraguayan War. He was the brother of Bartolomé Mitre and participated across the Uruguayan Civil War and the Argentine Civil Wars.

== Biography ==
Mitre spent his childhood and youth in Montevideo, and enlisted in the Uruguayan Army in 1841 . He participated in the Battle of Arroyo Grande and retired with General Fructuoso Rivera to Montevideo. There he defended the city during the siege imposed by Manuel Oribe. He joined the Ejército Grande of Justo José de Urquiza at the end of 1851 and fought in the Battle of Caseros.

Mitre then returned to Buenos Aires and participated in the Revolution of 11 September 1852 which divided the country between the Argentine Confederation and the State of Buenos Aires and defended the city during the siege imposed by Federal General Hilario Lagos.

He was placed in command of the Mercedes garrison, with the mission of preventing future federal invasions from Santa Fe from approaching the capital in the future.

In 1855 he was assigned to Fort Azul to prepare an offensive against the caciques Catriel and Cachul, which was ultimately unsuccessful. In September 1857, however, he achieved an important victory over the Ranquels in the Battle of Cañada de los Leones, near Melincué.

He fought in the Battle of Cepeda at the head of an infantry battalion, which was defeated by the superiority of the Federalist army.

Back on the frontier, he organized and built forts and pillboxes . He participated in the Battle of Pavón, and his brother, the governor and later president Bartolomé Mitre put him in command of the entire line of defense against the Native Americans in the Buenos Aires Province.

In 1865, at the outbreak of the Paraguayan War, he was promoted to the rank of general and commanded an infantry division in several battles. His greatest success was achieved by defeating a Paraguayan offensive at the Battle of Boquerón. He accompanied his brother on his return to Buenos Aires in 1867. Mitre then commanded a force of 3,000 to 5,000 men at the Battle of Tuyutí, assisting General Wenceslao Paunero.

In November 1868, President Domingo Faustino Sarmiento named him Commander-in-Chief of the Argentine forces in Paraguay but his participation in the war was very limited.

Following the end of the war, he was placed in command of the national army against the Jordanian Rebellion. The federal forces of Ricardo López Jordán inflicted several defeats on the national forces, without managing to destroy them, while avoiding frontal combat against them. He was replaced by General Juan Andrés Gelly y Obes, who managed to defeat López Jordán after many months of fighting.

During the first half of the 1870s he was the border commander of Buenos Aires and chief of staff of the Argentine Army. Although his participation in the Revolution of 1874 was indirect, he was assigned to administrative tasks, later going into retirement.

He was a national deputy between 1880 and 1884. In 1893 he was Chief of the General Staff, and participated in the suppression of the Revolution of the Park. Around 1893, he contracted pneumonia that would lead to his death at the end of the year.
