= USS Congress incident =

- Part of The Great Siege of Montevideo of the Uruguayan Civil War
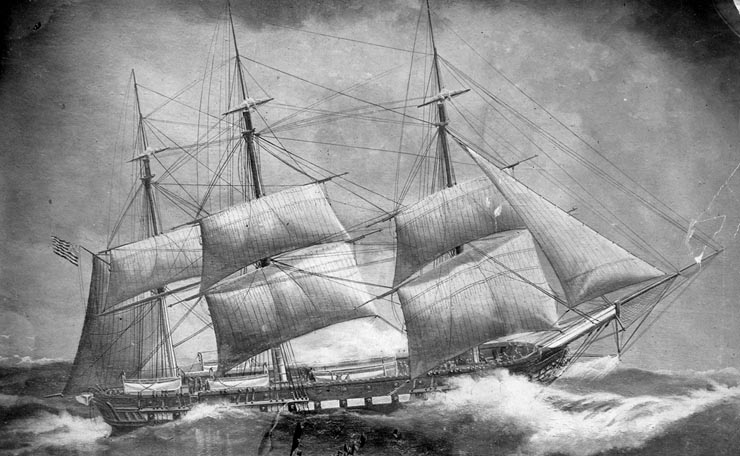
- USS Congress
Date	29 September 1844 (Confrontation); 14 October 1844 – 25 May 1845 (Diplomatic incident)
Location	Río de la Plata
Result	Status quo ante bellum: Maritime blocking of Montevideo resumed; Prosecution of Voorhees

Belligerents
Argentine Confederation	United States

Commanders and leaders
(Argentine Confederation) Juan Manuel de Rosas (Argentine Confederation) Felipe Arana (Argentine Confederation) Juan Fitton O’Connor	(United States) John Tyler (United States) John C. Calhoun (United States) Philip Voorhees

Units involved
1 frigate 1 brigantine 1 schooner (35 cannons)	1 frigate 1 brigantine (64 cannons)

The USS Congress incident was a confrontation between the forces of the United States Navy and the Argentine Navy in the Río de la Plata during the Great Siege of Montevideo of the Uruguayan Civil War.

== Prelude ==
=== Diplomatic situation ===
At the beginning of the 19th century, relations between Argentina and the United States had deteriorated considerably following the conflict over Puerto Soledad, a port settlement in the Falkland Islands, administered by Argentina. Between 1829 and 1831, a dispute arose over the United States' failure to enforce fishing regulations in the regions adjacent to the settlement, resulting in the capture by Argentina of three schooners: Harriet, Superior, and Breakwater.

The belligerent attitude of the US representative in Buenos Aires, George W. Slacum, led to continued confrontation, culminating in an attack by the frigate USS Lexington. Consequently, the Argentine presence on the islands was irreparably weakened, resulting in the British takeover in 1833, as well as the severance of diplomatic relations between the two countries from 1832 to 1843.

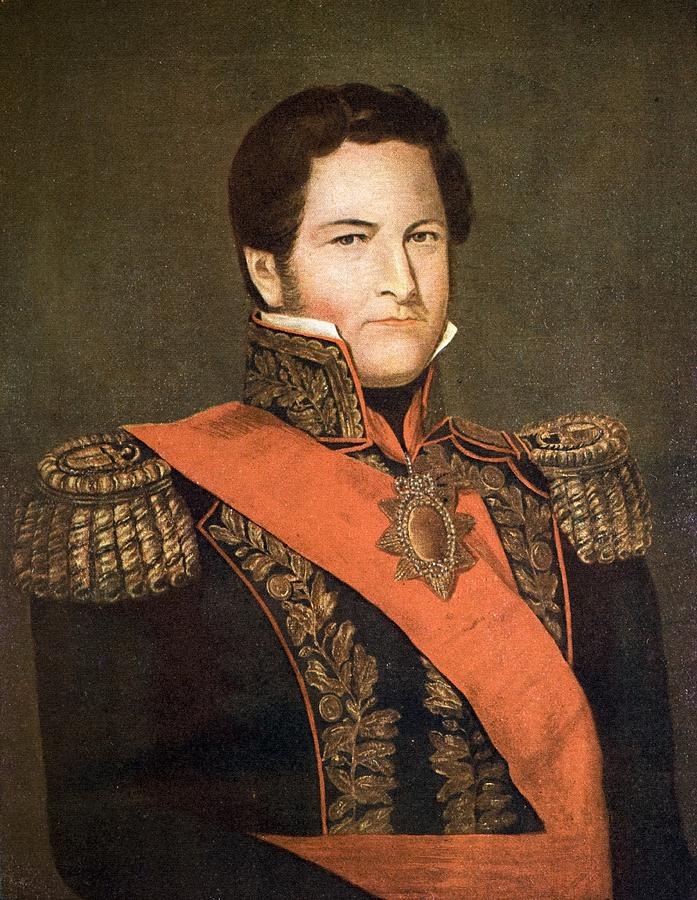
Juan Manuel de Rosas

In 1838, the leader (or caudillo) of the Argentine Confederation, Juan Manuel de Rosas, due to his rivalry with Andrés de Santa Cruz, leader of the Peru–Bolivian Confederation, and the French blockade of the Río de la Plata, pushed for the restoration and normalisation of bilateral relations with the United States. He showed preference for Manuel Moreno, ambassador to London, to be assigned as national representative in Washington, but Moreno refused citing health reasons. Carlos María de Alvear was appointed instead.

On 11 October 1838, Alvear was received by president Martin Van Buren. In September 1843, the Secretary of State of president John Tyler, Abel Parker Upshur, appointed special agent Harvey Magee Watterson as representative to Buenos Aires, formally re-establishing diplomatic relations.

=== Military situation ===
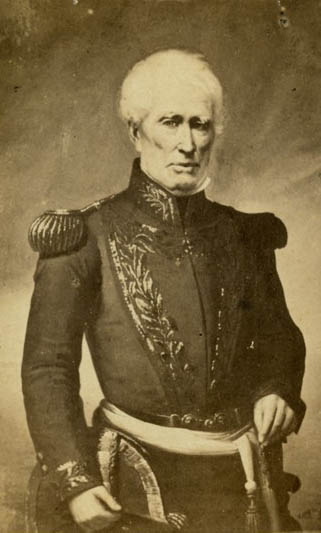
William Brown

During the 1840s, Argentina was engulfed by a civil war between the federalists of the Confederation, and the unitarians, part of the larger Uruguayan Civil War, that also involved fighting in frontier regions of the Brazilian Empire, as well as international interventions. During one of the most decisive battles, that of Arroyo Grande, the unitarians suffered a deciding defeat, which forced Uruguayan leader Fructuoso Rivera to seek refuge in Montevideo.

The federalist commander, Manuel Oribe, continued his offensive, besieging the capital on 16 February 1843. Its defence had been organised by general José María Paz. On 19 March, Rosas ordered Admiral William Brown to cut off communications and maritime activity of supply and commerce for the city. On 3 January 1844, captain Álvaro José de Alzogaray, leading a contingent of fifty men and the schooner 9 de Julio, took control of the city of Maldonado, which was used by Rivera's forces to attempt a breakout.

Nevertheless, even after the exile of the commander of the city's defence, and the recall of their ally, British Commodore John Brett Purvis, by order of his superiors, due to his takeover of Isla de Ratas, the besieged persisted. Other contributing factors included the fatigue of the besiegers, lack of relief, damage to ships, and delays by the command —led by Pedro Ximeno— in sending maintenance materials.

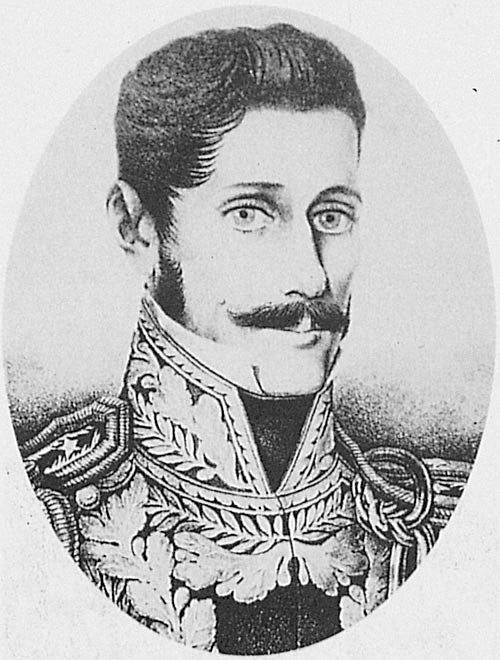
Manuel Oribe

On 27 June, aboard the General Belgrano, Ximeno arrived in Buenos Aires and delegated command of the siege to Colonel Antonio Toll. Juan Fitton O'Connor assumed the position of acting commander.

At the end of March, the USS Congress joined the brigantine USS Bainbridge and the frigate USS Raritan on the Río de la Plata.

== The incident ==
At approximately six o'clock in the morning on 29 September 1844, the armed pailebot San Cala, flying the Uruguayan flag, left its anchorage in Buceo, advanced to the blockade line and docked alongside the frigate 25 de Mayo, led by acting commander Juan Fitton O'Connor, to transfer documentation from commander Oribe. On its return journey, it spotted some fishing vessels attempting to evade the blockade. After a chase, it caught up with the first vessel, but diverted its attention when it saw another fishing vessel leaving the port.

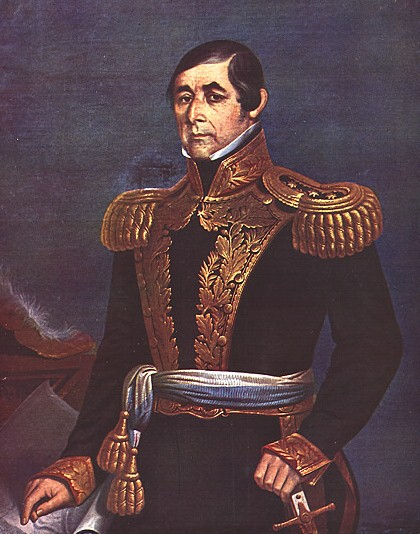
Fructuoso Rivera

It was the Rosalva, owned by a US citizen, which raised the star-spangled banner when it realised it was being pursued by San Cala, sending a launch to the frigate USS Congress, located about 300 yards (274 m) away. The frigate's commander, Philip Falkerson Voorhees, considered it an attack by Argentina and gave the order to intercept the San Cala. Upon reaching the ship, its crew was detained and transferred to the Congress as prisoners, raising the American flag over the vessel.

Similarly, the schooner 9 de Julio was stopped and boarded, while the attempt against the frigate 25 de Mayo was interrupted by the arrival of the brigantine-schooner Republicano. Fitton O'Connor, in an attempt to clarify what had happened and demand explanations for the attacks, sent a delegation boat to the Congress, whose crew was detained by Voorhees upon arrival at the frigate. With the boat seized, the Congress resumed its attempts to board the frigate 25 de Mayo, demanding that Fitton lower his flag. As a show of force, it fired one of its cannons, after which Fitton agreed.

Once the 25 de Mayo was captured and its crew and officers taken prisoner, Voorhees finally received Fitton. During the dialogue between the commanders, Fitton expressed his astonishment at the outbreak of hostilities against his own ships, as the pailebot San Cala was flying the Uruguayan flag; Voorhees replied that it was a false flag. Finally, the American commander announced that the detained ships would be released.

Fitton, however, answered that unless Voorhees provided the necessary repairs, he could not accept leadership again and delegated responsibility for supervising the squadron to the American commander. He formalised this in a note, stating:

I no longer have any influence whatsoever, and I have also ordered my ship commanders to refrain from giving any orders and to disengage themselves completely from any obligation. […] Let it be known that the Argentine Squadron, and consequently your safety in any event, is now your responsibility, and I solemnly protest that from this moment on, all responsibility will fall on you.

The next morning, Voorhees offered his response: the San Cala and its 26 crew members were to remain detained.

On 1 October, Fitton again insisted that the captured ships be returned and that, as a measure of reparation, the Americans salute the Argentine flag with 21 cannon shots, followed by an equivalent response from Argentina, leaving the resolution of the conflict to the decision of their respective governments.

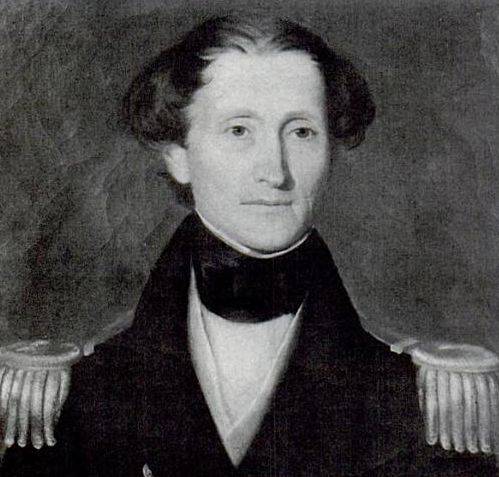
Philip Falkerson Voorhees

Voorhees insisted that the firing against Rosalva and Bainbridge was attributable to “part of [Fitton's] squadron”, that he had been “necessarily placed on the defensive” and that Fitton owed his freedom “to [his] moderation and generosity, rather than to the strict justice of the case”. He also stated that he would salute the Argentine flag on condition that the American flag be raised first, while the San Cala would remain in his custody, concluding the communiqué by saying that if his proposal was not accepted, “correspondence between us would cease”.

On 27 September, Antonio Toll, to whom Pedro Ximeno had delegated command of the Navy, set sail on the General Echagüe to join the Argentine squadron, unaware of the circumstances of the incident. With headwinds, he passed Punta Lara on the 29th and on 1 October he recorded in his logbook:

As it grew lighter, we saw the Argentine squadron. At 8 o'clock, I fired a cannon shot, hoisted the flag and my insignia, and our ships did not even have a flag. At 9:30, a boat from the 25 arrived and the officer told me that his commander had informed him that our ships were being held captive by the American frigate Congress. I then wanted to anchor near the Congress and ask for an explanation, but commander Fitton was told not to do such a thing, as Mr. Fernando Oyuela was on board, sent by His Excellency the President to settle this matter. So I went to Buceo and sent the assistant to consult with His Excellency the President on what to do in such critical circumstances. He sent word back to me that the Squadron was no longer a prisoner and that I could do as I pleased.

At seven o'clock in the morning on 2 October, Toll received Fitton and Oyuela, who delivered a note from Voorhees refusing to offer a reward for what had happened. Toll organised a war council, concluding with the decision not to pursue the matter further and to consider the incident closed.

The news reached Buenos Aires, causing discontent on the part of Rosas over Toll's decision to act without waiting for a proper resolution. On 14 October, Foreign Minister Felipe Arana sent him a note stating:

The displeasure with which His Excellency the Governor had viewed your raising of the Argentine flag on the 2nd, after the unpleasant events that had taken place […] whose outcome, due to its importance and result, had to be reserved for the government's judgement.

In his response, Antonio Toll absolved himself of blame due to a lack of instructions, stating that “I have transgressed, but not by intention”.

== Resolution ==
On 21 October, Commodore Daniel Turner, head of the US naval station in Rio de Janeiro, quickly travelled to Montevideo upon learning of the incident and Voorhees' actions, in an attempt to preserve relations between the two countries. On 4 November, he met with Toll at the Montevideo anchorage, who expressed his dissatisfaction with the American commander's actions, which were carried out without orders or authority.

In December, Rosas informed the legislature about the “official assurances given by the special agent, by the chargé d'affaires and by the commodore of the United States Squadron at the stations in Brazil and Río de la Plata” to obtain “prompt explanations and complete satisfaction” from the American government and to have instructed the Argentine minister in Washington in the same vein.

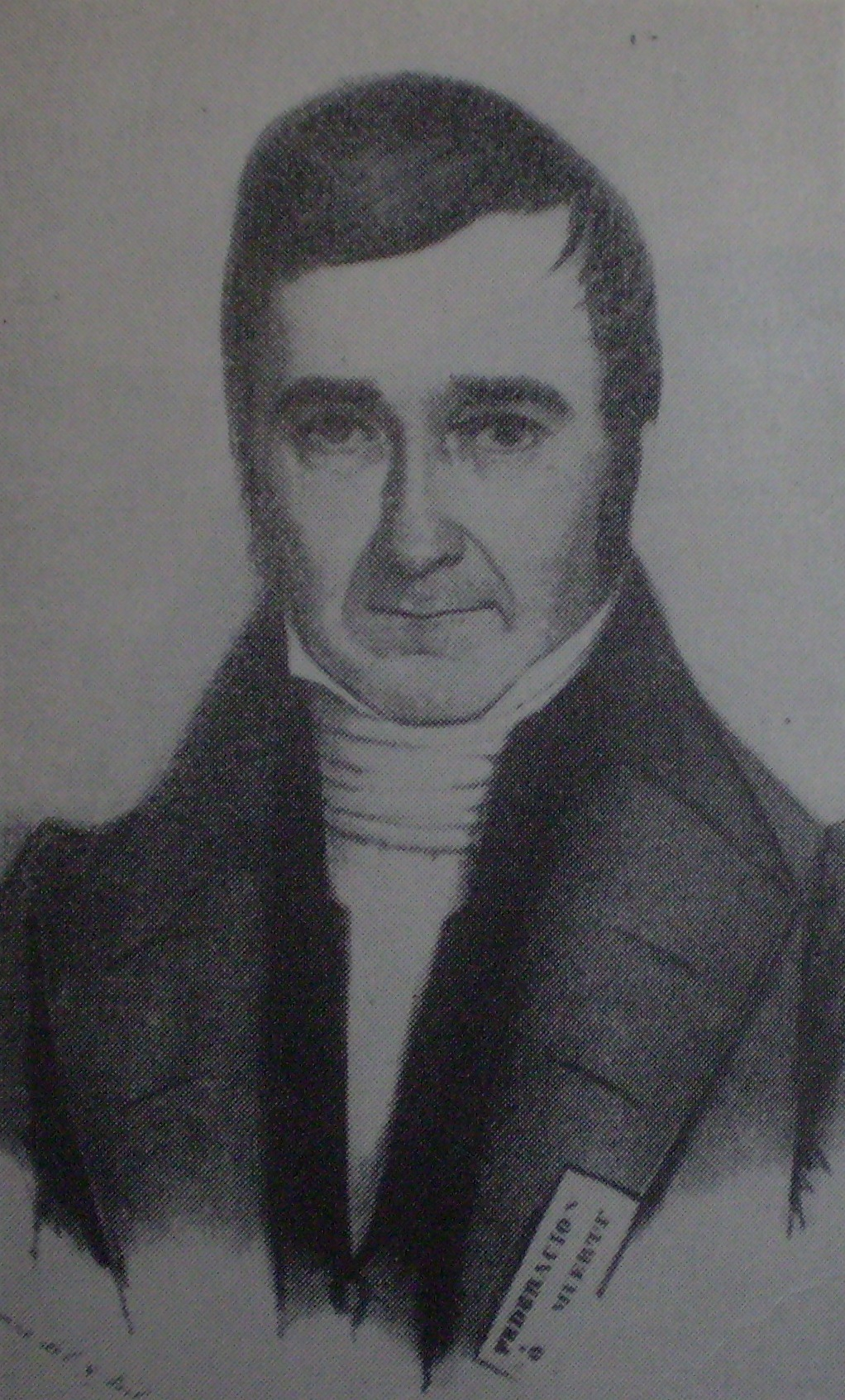
Felipe Arana

Voorhees did not offer any apologies at any point. On 1 November, he sent a letter to the American representative in Rio de Janeiro:

I had no alternative but dishonour or punishment of the Argentine squadron […] These people are a band of bloodthirsty barbarians […] They fire without caring where, whether they hit or miss, not caring if they kill a dozen neutral friends, as long as they kill one of their enemies.

Returning to the United States on the USS Congress, while sailing near the Ecuadorian coast, Voorhees boasted to his lieutenant, David Dixon Porter, disobeying his orders to sail to Norfolk, stating that he would sail to Annapolis, where his wife and family were waiting for him. Voorhees was connected through his wife to future president Zachary Taylor. However, he later offered other explanations to Admiral William Branford Shubrick, saying that the decision to change course to Annapolis was made at the last minute due to wind, weather and meteorological conditions.

=== Trial of Voorhees ===
In 1845, Voorhees was tried by two courts-martial. From 2 to 24 June, he was tried for the capture of the fleet on charges of insubordination with five specifications. The proceedings were secret and took place at the Washington shipyards and the Coleman Hotel. He was unanimously sentenced “to be reprimanded in an order issued by the Secretary of the Navy, and to be suspended for a term of three years from this date”.

Subsequently, from 24 June to 14 July, he was tried for the incident of the return to Annapolis. The lenient sentence handed down by the second court-martial, which was due in part, according to the court itself, to its sympathy for the defendant, who had already undergone an exhausting court-martial, caused a scandal.

William Branford Shubrick pushed for a third court-martial, which in August reviewed and toughened the sentence, removing him from the navy. President James K. Polk, however, reduced the verdict to a five-year suspension, which was later reduced to three years. In 1847, Voorhees returned to active duty with his rank on the USS Plymouth.

The conduct of Voorhees, along with that of Commander Alexander Slidell Mackenzie, in the most famous mutiny on the USS Sommers, influenced the urgent creation of the United States Naval Academy.
