= The New Troy =

1850 novel by Alexandre Dumas

Montevideo, or the new Troy
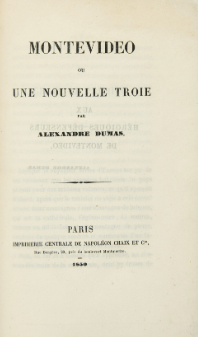
- Title page for Montevideo, ou une nouvelle Troie (1850)
- Author: Alexandre Dumas
- Original title: Montevideo, ou une nouvelle Troie
- Language: French
- Publication date: 1850
- Publication place: France

Montevideo, or the new Troy (French: Montevideo, ou une nouvelle Troie) is an 1850 novel by Alexandre Dumas. It is a historical novel about the Uruguayan Civil War, where the Uruguayan presidents Manuel Oribe and Fructuoso Rivera disputed the rule of the country. The name sets a parallelism with the Trojan War, as Oribe kept Montevideo, capital of Uruguay, under siege for many years (known as the Great Siege of Montevideo).

The plot of the book makes a summary of the history of Uruguay, from Spanish colonization to the Civil War. Juan Manuel de Rosas, Juan Facundo Quiroga, José Gervasio Artigas, Bernardino Rivadavia, and Giuseppe Garibaldi are thus treated as literary characters. Dumas describes Artigas and Rosas as barbaric, and Montevideo as a source of civilization. A similar dichotomy between civilization and barbarism was the theme of Facundo, another antirosist book published by Domingo Faustino Sarmiento in 1845. Dumas described Rosas, who supported Oribe, as a coward who avoided the Argentine War of Independence and took control of Buenos Aires with a barbaric horde, and Montevideo as a heroic city standing against him.

Dumas had never been to Uruguay, nor known first-hand about the war. His work was based on the reports of the antirosist Melchor Pacheco, who sought French support against Rosas, and thus twisted the information about Rosas' administration in order to get such support. It is likely that the similarities with Sarmiento's book were introduced by Pacheco's, as it would have been unlikely that Dumas had read the former's work.

The book has been edited twice in Argentina, once during the 1960s and again in 2005. An English translation has been available for Amazon Kindle since 2019.

== See also ==
- Troy
