= Chico Pedro's raids =

- Part of Uruguayan Civil War
Date	26 December 1849 - 6 March 1850
Location	Uruguay and Empire of Brazil
Result	Brazilian victory

Belligerents
Empire of Brazil	Gobierno del Cerrito; Support by: Argentine Confederation

Commanders and leaders
Chico Pedro; Francisco Andrea	Manuel Oribe; Servando Gómez; Diego Lamas; Dionisio Trillo

Strength
400 men	500 men

Casualties and losses
Unknown	Unknown

The Chico Pedro raids was a guerrilla war waged by the troops of Francisco Pedro Buarque de Abreu, also known as Chico Pedro and Baron of Jacuí, in Uruguay between 1849 and 1850, defending the interests of Brazilian landowners.

== Context and Engagement ==
After the army composed of Argentine and Uruguayan troops under the command of Manuel Oribe, invaded Uruguay and defeated Rivera's forces, conquering almost the entire Uruguayan territory, Oribe allowed his allies to invade southern Brazil, stealing cattle, raiding estancias, and murdering Brazilian citizens. More than 188 Brazilian farms were attacked, while 814,000 head of cattle and 16,950 horses were stolen.

Chico Pedro, Baron of Jacuí, decided on his own initiative to carry out reprisals against Uruguay by organizing cattle-raiding expeditions which in Portuguese is known as “Califórnias”, a reference to the California Gold Rush in the western United States. These expeditions were a lucrative business, regarded in Argentina and Uruguay as acts of banditry. They received assistance from opponents of Juan Manuel de Rosas, including the Madariaga brothers from the Province of Corrientes. The first invasion took place on 26 December 1849 and was finally suppressed by the Imperial administration in Rio Grande do Sul beginning on 6 March 1850.

They invaded northern Río Negro to steal cattle, but were opposed by Colonel Diego Eugenio Lamas and Commander Dionisio Trillo, who were part of Servando Gómez's division.
