= Brazilian blockade of the Río de la Plata (1851) =

- Part of the Platine War
- Map showing the line of the Brazilian blockade in 1851
Date	June 1851 - February 1852
Location	Paraná River, Argentina
Result	Brazilian victory; successful blockade of the Río de la Plata

Belligerents
Empire of Brazil; Defense Government	Cerrito Government; Argentina

Commanders and leaders
(Empire of Brazil) John Pascoe Grenfell; (Uruguay) John Halstead Coe	Manuel Oribe

The Brazilian blockade of the Río de la Plata was a long blockade imposed by the Empire of Brazil against the Argentine Confederation and the Cerrito Government, their ally in Uruguay, during the Platine War. The Imperial Brazilian Navy kept them from communicating, and, very importantly, also kept Manuel Oribe, leader of the Argentine-backed Uruguayan forces, from reaching Argentine territory after his defeat in the land campaign.

The blockade was led by English-Brazilian admiral John Pascoe Grenfell. Brazilian supremacy in the river allowed them freedom of movement to move troops and supplies to and from Uruguay.
