= Lía Mainero Berro =

- Born: Lía Mainero Berro; 1 January 1902; Montevideo, Uruguay
- Died: 1 January 1964 (aged 62); Montevideo, Uruguay
- Education: Círculo de Bellas Artes (Uruguay)
- Known for: Painting
- Movement: Naïve art
- Relatives: Bernardo Prudencio Berro (great-grandfather)

Lía Mainero Berro (1902–1964), known affectionately as Lita to her family and friends, was a Uruguayan painter celebrated as an exponent of art naïf. Her deeply personal and imaginative works often explored themes of purity, innocence, and fantasy, setting her apart from the prevailing artistic trends of her time. Despite a life of privilege, she forged an independent artistic path, unconstrained by the conventions of her era.

== Early life and background ==
Born in Montevideo in 1902 into a prominent and affluent family, Mainero Berro's upbringing reflected the liberal values of her environment. She was the descendant of historical figures such as Bernardo Prudencio Berro, a former Uruguayan president and poet, and Pedro Prudencio Berro, a Spanish patriot and early constitutionalist. These familial influences fostered a deep appreciation for art and culture in Mainero Berro from an early age.

Nicknamed "Lita," she grew up surrounded by governesses and private tutors, in line with the education afforded to young women of Uruguay's elite. Her introduction to painting was unconventional, as she started as an autodidact, later receiving formal training for a brief period under Professor Bazzurro at the Círculo de Bellas Artes.

== Artistic vision and style ==
Mainero Berro's works embodied the art naïf style long before it gained recognition in Uruguay. She created her paintings from a place of deep emotion, often stating, "I paint what interests me and only when I feel it." Her canvases frequently depicted whimsical scenes of children at play, celestial beings, enchanted forests, and mythical creatures. Her use of vibrant yet harmonious colors and her deliberately simplistic forms imbued her work with an air of nostalgia and poetic grace.

Her style was both celebrated and critiqued. Uruguayan art critic Eduardo Díaz Yepes praised her art as "expressions of a sensitive world, full of poetry and grace, given by a hand as wise as it is innocent, like that of a child." In contrast, influential critic Jorge Romero Brest noted that while her work conveyed meaning, her use of color lacked the necessary purity to fully express her intentions.

Her work also echoed satirical humanist traditions, drawing comparisons to Erasmus of Rotterdam's In Praise of Folly. Mainero Berro's art reflected an authenticity that stood in stark contrast to the cold formalism of contemporary artistic movements.

A 2016 documentary titled Frifinnelsen revisited her legacy, shedding light on her life and contributions to art. In addition, her family and various cultural institutions have preserved a wealth of archival materials, including photographs, exhibition catalogs, and critical essays.

== Career highlights ==
Mainero Berro participated in several national and municipal exhibitions, gaining moderate critical acclaim. She also presented solo exhibitions, notably at Amigos del Arte in Montevideo and Galería Lirolay in Buenos Aires, where her work received support from established artists.

Her exhibitions often featured her signature oil paintings, which were praised for their literary qualities and evocative imagery. Critics highlighted her ability to conjure dreamlike settings imbued with emotional depth, describing her pieces as "pictorial poems" that captured the imagination.
