= María del Carmen Árraga =

19th-Century Uraguayan Painter

- Born: 14 May 1840; Montevideo, Uruguay
- Died: Unknown
- Known for: Painting
- Notable work: portraits of prominent Uruguayan political figures such as Venancio Flores, Tomás Gomensoro, Alejandro Chucarro, Joaquín Suárez and José Gervasio Artigas
- Awards: the Senate original monetary award 1882

María del Carmen Árraga (born 14 May 1840, Montevideo, Uruguay) was a Uruguayan painter known for her portraits and still-life compositions, as well as for her role as one of the first notable female artists in 19th-century Uruguay. Árraga was a disciple of the artist Juan Manuel Blanes.

== Early life and artistic beginnings ==
Árraga began her career focusing on landscape painting but soon transitioned to portraiture and still-life compositions. In 1869, she started to exhibit her artwork publicly.

== Scholarship and challenges ==
In 1870, Árraga became the first Uruguayan female artist to obtain a government scholarship for studies in Europe.

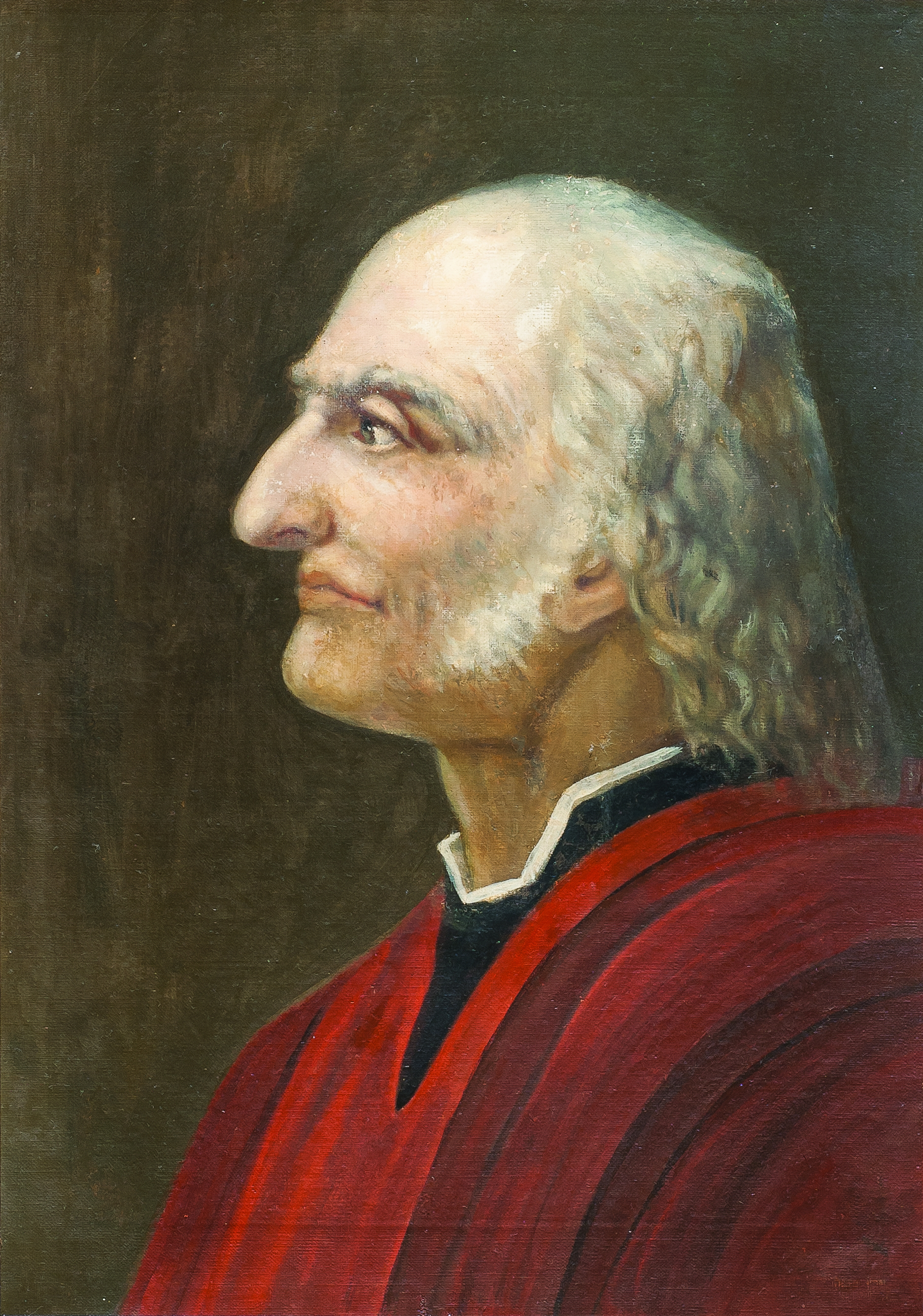
Carmen Arraga de Sardeson - José Artigas

== Notable works ==
Árraga painted portraits of several prominent Uruguayan political figures, such as Venancio Flores, Tomás Gomensoro, Alejandro Chucarro, and Joaquín Suárez. She made one of the first depictions of Uruguayan national hero José Gervasio Artigas around 1863. This portrait is part of the collection at the Museo Histórico Nacional in Montevideo.

In 1869, Árraga painted a portrait of Joaquín Suárez, which she dedicated to the General Assembly of Uruguay. For this, she was awarded a prize of 1,000 pesos by the Senate. She later petitioned that this prize be converted into a scholarship for further studies in Europe. Although initially approved, Árraga was unable to travel because of family problems. In 1882, she petitioned the Senate to receive the original monetary award instead, which was granted the subsequent year.
