= Battle of Carpintería =

1836 battle in Uruguay

- Part of the Uruguayan Civil War
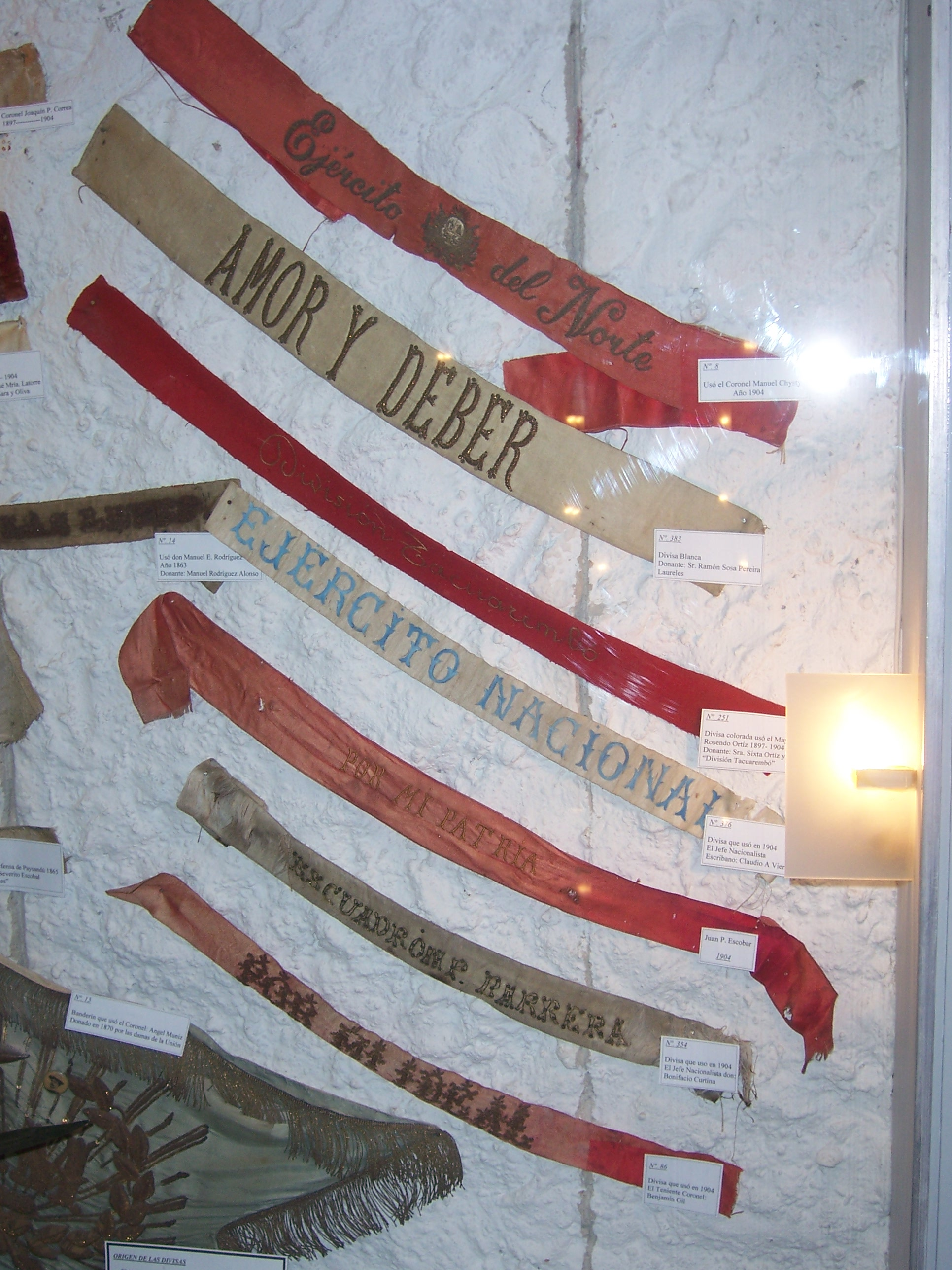
Date	September 19, 1836
Location	Carpintería creek, Durazno Department, Uruguay
Result	Oribe government victory

Belligerents
Government of Manuel Oribe	Rebels with Fructuoso Rivera

Commanders and leaders
Ignacio Oribe; Juan Antonio Lavalleja	Fructuoso Rivera; Juan Lavalle

Strength
2,200 – 3,000	1,400

The Battle of Carpintería was an important battle between troops loyal to the government of Manuel Oribe and the revolutionary forces led by Fructuoso Rivera.

The combattants differentiated themselves with white or red-colored insignias. The whites were conservative and supporters of Federalism, while the red-colored supported liberalism and were close to the Unitarians.

The battle meant a success for the government. This is considered the birth of the National Party ("blancos", white) and the Colorado Party ("colorados", red-colored).
