= Carlos Anaya =

Uruguayan politician and historian (1777–1862)

Carlos Anaya Lopez Camelo
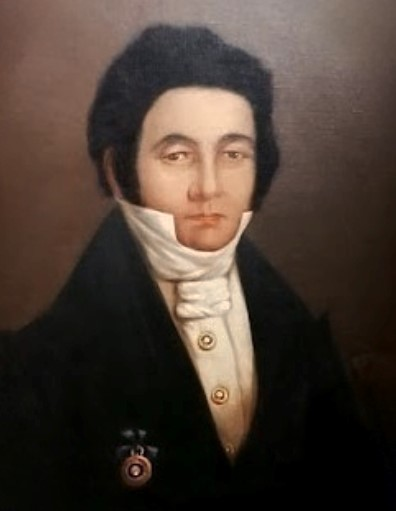

President of Uruguay
- In office 24 October 1834 – 1 March 1835
- Preceded by: Fructuoso Rivera
- Succeeded by: Manuel Oribe

Personal details
- Born: 1777 San Pedro, Buenos Aires, Viceroyalty of the Río de la Plata, Spanish Empire (now in Argentina)
- Died: 1862 (aged 84) Montevideo, Uruguay
- Political party: Colorado Party
- Occupation: politician, historian

Carlos Anaya Lopez Camelo (November 4 1777–June 18 1862) was a Uruguayan politician and historian from Buenos Aires, who served as interim President of the Republic between 1834 and 1835, in his capacity as President of the Senate.

== Background ==
Anaya was born in San Pedro, Buenos Aires. He drafted the Uruguayan Declaration of Independence, 1825.

He was senator from 1832 to 1838. This was in the period before the party system had been fully developed in Uruguay. In October 1834 President Fructuoso Rivera stepped down from office. Anaya served as the President of the Senate of Uruguay from 1834 to 1835, and from 1837 to 1838.

Anaya was the author of some noted historical works.

== President of Uruguay ==
Anaya served as President of Uruguay from 24 October 1834 to 1 March 1835, having succeeded Fructuoso Rivera in that office.

Anaya was himself succeeded as president by Manuel Oribe.

== Death ==
Anaya died in Montevideo on June 18 1862.

== See also ==
- Politics of Uruguay

Political offices
Preceded by Fructuoso Rivera	President of Uruguay; Acting; 1834–1835	Succeeded by Manuel Oribe
