= Bernardo Berro =

Uruguayan politician

Bernardo Prudencio Berro
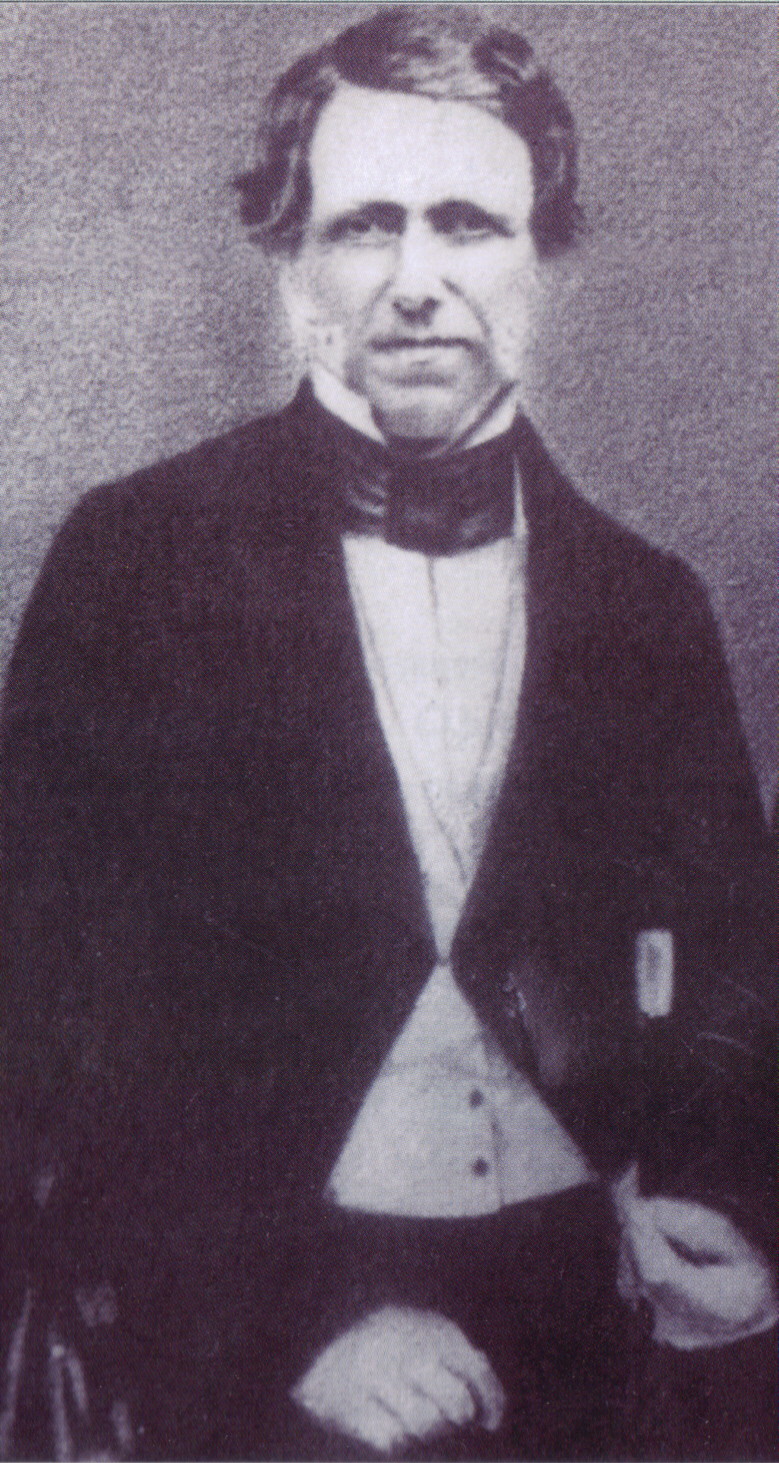
- Bernardo Berro

7th President of Uruguay
- In office March 1, 1860 – March 1, 1864
- Preceded by: Gabriel Antonio Pereira
- Succeeded by: Atanasio Cruz Aguirre

Provisional President of Uruguay (as President of the Senate)
- In office February 15, 1852 – March 1, 1852
- Preceded by: Joaquín Suárez
- Succeeded by: Juan Francisco Giró

Personal details
- Born: Bernardo Prudencio Berro Larrañaga; April 28, 1803 Montevideo, Uruguay
- Died: February 19, 1868 (aged 64) Montevideo, Uruguay
- Cause of death: murder
- Party: National Party
- Spouse: Práxedes Rosa Bustamante del Puerto
- Occupation: politician revolutionary writer

Military service
- Allegiance: (Argentina) Provincias Unidas del Río de la Plata; Blancos

Bernardo Prudencio Berro (April 28, 1803 – February 19, 1868) was the President of Uruguay from 1860 to 1864.

== Background ==
Berro was a member of the National (Blanco) Party. He served as the President of the Senate of Uruguay in 1852, and from 1858 to 1859.

== President of Uruguay (first, provisional term) ==
Berro first served as head of state of Uruguay in a provisional government for several weeks in 1852, during a brief period in which the National Party came to power.

== President of Uruguay (second term) ==
He led the National Party's return to power in 1860 and made attempts to unite the country's political factions, efforts not seldom opposed by members of his own Party and Government.

He was overthrown by a rebellion led by Venancio Flores.

== Assassination ==
Berro and former president Venancio Flores were both assassinated on February 19, 1868.

== Political views ==
Berro supported Anti-european liberalism. However he favored French liberal thinker Alexis de Tocqueville.

== See also ==
- History of Uruguay
- Paraguayan War

Political offices
Preceded by Joaquín Suárez	President of Uruguay; Acting; 1852	Succeeded by Juan Francisco Giró
Preceded by Gabriel Antonio Pereira	President of Uruguay; 1860-1864	Succeeded by Atanasio Aguirre; Acting
