= Great Siege of Montevideo =

Event in the Uruguayan Civil War

- Part of the Uruguayan Civil War and the Platine War
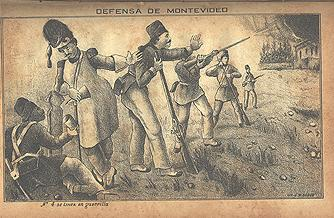
| Date | 16 November 1843 – 8 October 1851 (7 years, 10 months, 3 weeks and 1 day) |
| Location | Montevideo, Uruguay |
| Result | Ceasefire agreement: The siege is relieved after the intervention of the Empire of Brazil and Argentine province Entre Ríos |

Belligerents
| Besiegers: Cerrito Government; Argentina; Support: Federalist Party | Besieged: Defense Government; Unitarian Party; Support: Empire of Brazil; Entre Ríos (1851); Corrientes (1851); Italian Redshirts; United Kingdom; France; Piratini (1843–1845) |

Commanders and leaders
| Manuel Oribe (surrendered); Ignacio Oribe; Ángel Pacheco; William Brown; J. J. de Urquiza (1843-1850) | Joaquín Suárez; Melchor Pacheco; José María Paz; Martín Rodríguez; José Rondeau; Count of Caxias; J. J. de Urquiza (1851); Giuseppe Garibaldi; Jean Thiebaut |

Strength
| 1843: 3,630; 3,550; 1851: 11,000–14,000 | 1843: 3,000–8,000; (France) 1,500–2,000; 400–600; 500; 1851: 12,000–19,000; 5,000; 1,500; (Reinforcements) |

The Great Siege of Montevideo (Spanish: Gran Sitio de Montevideo), named as Sitio Grande in Uruguayan historiography, was the siege suffered by the city of Montevideo between 1843 and 1851 during the Uruguayan Civil War.

In practice, this siege meant that Uruguay had two parallel governments:

- Gobierno de la Defensa in Montevideo, led by Joaquín Suárez (1843 – 1852)
- Gobierno del Cerrito (with headquarters in the present-day neighborhood of Cerrito de la Victoria), ruling the rest of the country, led by Manuel Oribe (1843 – 1851)

The siege inspired a book by the French writer Alexandre Dumas, The New Troy (1850).

== Background ==
In July 1836, Fructuoso Rivera, offended by the results of an examination of his administration and also dismissed from the post of commander of the army, rebelled against the government of Manuel Oribe. In the midst of this rivalry, two political groups were formed: the Colorados, led by Rivera, and the Blancos, led by Oribe. On 19 September 1836, the battle of Carpintería was fought between the army loyal to the government of Manuel Oribe — under the command of him and Juan Antonio Lavalleja — and the revolutionary forces of Fructuoso Rivera, allied with the Argentine Unitarians exiled in Uruguay under the command of General Juan Lavalle.

In the following year, Rivera continued his campaign, reinforced by troops from the Piratini Republic. He defeated Oribe on 22 October 1837 at Yucutujá. Shortly afterwards, Rivera himself was defeated at the river Yí, but the Rivera-Brazilian alliance's victories in 1838 secured the region for Rivera. Elsewhere, the French blockade at Buenos Aires left president Oribe isolated. Under pressure from the situation at the Río de la Plata and besieged at Montevideo, Oribe announced his resignation on 24 October 1838, allowing Rivera to assume power. Oribe then fled to Buenos Aires.

== Uruguayan Civil War ==
In 1839, the Uruguayan Civil War began. The Federalist governor of Buenos Aires Province, Juan Manuel de Rosas, refused to recognize Rivera's government as legitimate and allied himself with Oribe. The conflict between Rivera and Oribe then transformed into an international conflict, with Argentine and Brazilian forces intervening on the side of Rivera along with mercenary-like forces from France, the United Kingdom, and Italians led by Giuseppe Garibaldi.

From 1839 to 1842, the conflict largely took place within Argentine territory. Rosas put Oribe in charge of the federalist army and Lavalle did the same with Rivera, putting him in charge of the Unitarian forces. In September 1840, Oribe forced Lavalle to retreat to Santa Fe Province. Lavalle's force was constantly harassed, and he failed several times to reorganize his battered army. The campaign ended with the death of Lavalle on 9 October 1841 during a skirmish with federal troops of San Salvador de Jujuy, the capital of the Argentine province of Jujuy.

== Start of the Siege ==
The second stage of the war, which lasted from 1842 to 1851, took place within Uruguayan territory. After the victory at the Battle of Arroyo Grande, Oribe's army crossed the Uruguay River and began the siege of Montevideo on 16 February 1843. This would mark the third and longest siege of Montevideo that Oribe had participated in.

Immediately afterwards, Oribe formed the Cerrito Government as though nothing had happened since his resignation on 24 October 1838. In this stage of the conflict, two governments existed in the country. There was the Defense Government, led by Rivera, who controlled Montevideo, and the Cerrito Government, led by Oribe, who controlled the rest of Uruguay and had set up three encampments on the outskirts of the city. The militia was organized in the Cerrito de la Victoria, the capital was located in Restauración, a town currently located in the La Unión neighborhood, and economic affairs were handled in the port of Buceo. Oribe set the Constitution of 1830 as the basis for his laws.

== Defenses of Montevideo ==
While Oribe besieged Montevideo, the Colorados organized a defense force under the command of José María Paz and Melchor Pacheco. He was joined by several groups from the French, Spanish and Italian communities, all of them immigrants and mostly residents of Montevideo who formed "legions" that numerically exceeded the Oriental troops that the Colorados had. Due to the continuous wave of immigration that had begun in 1830, the vast majority of these immigrants were concentrated in the capital where they became fighters for the Colorados that supported Rivera and the Defense Government. According to population data from 1843, Orientals only made up a third of Montevideo's population.

The militias were organized by nationality. They were:

- Argentine legion
- Italian legion, led by Giuseppe Garibaldi
- Basque legion
- French battalions under Oriental command
- Montevidean battalion
- Battalions of free Africans

== Relief of the Siege ==
In 1851, the situation changed radically. Uruguayan diplomat Andrés Lamas gained the Empire of Brazil's support and commitment to intervene in the siege of the side of the Defense Government. In addition, Justo José de Urquiza, governor of neighboring Entre Rios province, broke his alliance with Rosas. On 29 May, an alliance treaty was signed in Montevideo between the Defense Government, which was presented as the only legitimate Uruguayan government, the Empire of Brazil, and Entre Rios. In the document, they agreed to expel Oribe from Uruguay and established that any act of the Argentine government against this purpose would make it an enemy of the coalition. A new Oriental army was put under the command of Eugenio Garzón, a former supporter of Oribe who had changed allegiances.

On 19 July, Urquiza invaded Uruguay, crossing the Uruguay River at Paysandú. Garzón also invaded, crossing at Concordia. At Paysandú, Urquiza joined up with other officers fed up with the seemingly endless conflict. After rejecting an offer to join on the side of the Defense Government, Ignacio Oribe attempted to engage the invaders, resulting in a mass desertion of his troops. In response, Manuel Oribe left 6,000 troops to besiege the city and sent 3,000 to face Urquiza and join up with the remaining soldiers under the command of his brother Ignacio Oribe.

On 4 September, 16,000 Brazilian troops led by Luís Alves de Lima e Silva, Count of Caxias entered Uruguay. Oribe realized resistance was impossible and surrendered on 19 October.

== Aftermath ==
After a long period of negotiation, a series of treaties were signed between Brazil and Uruguay that gave the former more influence in the latter's internal affairs. In addition, Brazil, Uruguay, and Entre Rios formed an alliance to invade Argentina with the goal of deposing Juan Manuel de Rosas.

Argentine political scientist Luis Schenoni has argued that the siege also had long-term consequences for Uruguayan state formation. The prolonged mobilization contributed to the development of military, bureaucratic, and educational institutions, while the successful defense of the city strengthened a cross-party coalition of urban Blanco and Colorado elites that favored modernization and a stronger central state. In 1852, the postwar government conducted Uruguay's first national census, drawing on bureaucratic capacity developed during and immediately after the siege.

== See also ==
- Gobierno de la Defensa
- Gobierno del Cerrito
- Uruguayan Civil War

== Bibliography ==
- Bruce, George Harbottle (1981). Harbottle's Dictionary of Battles. Van Nostrand Reinhold. ISBN 0-442-22336-6
- Casas, Lincoln R. Maiztegui (2005). Orientales: una historia política del Uruguay (in Spanish). Montevideo: Planeta.
- Levene, Ricardo (1939). Historia de la nación argentina: (desde los orígenes hasta la organización definitiva en 1862 (in Spanish). Buenos Aires: El Ateneo.
- McLean, David (1998) Garibaldi in Uruguay: A Reputation Reconsidered Vol. 113, No. 451. The English Historical Review. (Apr., 1998), pp. 351–66.
- Núñez, Estuardo (1979). Tradiciones hispanoamericanas (in Spanish). Caracas: Fundacion Biblioteca Ayacuch. ISBN 978-84-660-0029-1.
- Rela, Walter (1998). Uruguay cronología histórica anotada: República Oriental del Uruguay 1830-1864 (in Spanish). Montevideo: ALFAR. ISBN 978-9974-39-173-4.
- Sahuleka, Daniel; Navia, Vicente (1886). Compendio cronológico de historia universal por Mor. Daniel (in Spanish). Impr. de El Laurak-Bat.
- Saldías, Adolfo (1978). Historia de la Confederación Argentina. Tomo III (in Spanish). Buenos Aires: EUDEBA, Editorial Universitaria de Buenos Aires.
- Salgado, José (1943). Historia de la República Oriental del Uruguay. Tomo VIII (in Spanish). Montevideo: Tallares A. Barreiro y Ramos.
- Solari, Juan Antonio (1951). De la tiranía a la organización nacional: Juan Francisco Seguí, secretario de Urquiza en 1851 (in Spanish). Buenos Aires: Bases.
