= Battle of Arroyo Grande =

- Part of the Uruguayan Civil War
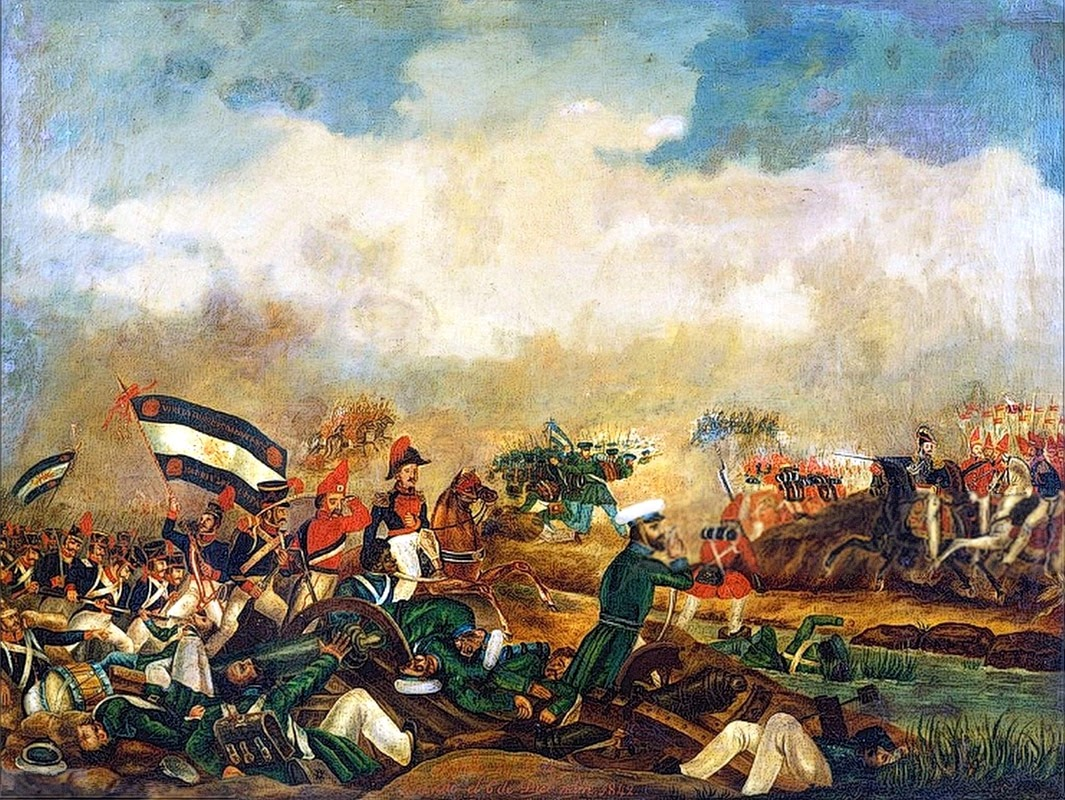
- Painting by Carlos Descalzo
Date	6 December 1842
Location	Arroyo Grande, Entre Ríos Province, Argentina
Result	Blanco victory

Belligerents
Blancos; Argentine Confederation	Colorados; Unitarian Party

Commanders and leaders
Manuel Oribe	Fructuoso Rivera

Strength
12,000	7,500

Casualties and losses
300 killed and wounded	2,000 killed 1,400 wounded

The Battle of Arroyo Grande took place on 6 December 1842 and was a major battle of the Uruguayan Civil War.

== Battle ==
At Arroyo Grande, the federal forces, or blancos, of Manuel Oribe defeated the colorados of Fructuoso Rivera, having been in conflict with them since 1838.

== Aftermath ==
Following the battle, Oribe followed up his victory over the Colorados by marching to and besieging Montevideo thus beginning the Great Siege of Montevideo.

== See also ==
- Origin of the Uruguayan Civil War
