= War between the Argentine Confederation and the state of Buenos Aires =

Conflict during the Argentine Civil War

War between the Argentine Confederation and the State of Buenos Aires
- Part of the Argentine Civil Wars
- In dark blue the territory of the Argentine Confederation. In blue, the State of Buenos Aires.
Date	1852–1862
Location	Argentina
Result	Buenos Aires victory: Argentine reunification

Belligerents
Argentina	Buenos Aires

Commanders and leaders
Justo J. de Urquiza	Bartolomé Mitre

Strength
1852: 2,500 regulars 83,000 national guardsmen 1858: 121,500 men	1852: 3,500 regulars 70,000 national guardsmen 1863: 41,514 men

The war between the Argentine Confederation and the state of Buenos Aires also called Argentine Unification War was a conflict of the prolonged Argentine Civil War. It began with the secession of Buenos Aires from Argentina, and lasted from 1852 to 1862. With the military victory of Buenos Aires at the battle of Pavón, the country was unified again.

The battle of Caseros, in 1852, marked a turning point in Argentine history: the fall of the government of Juan Manuel de Rosas opened the way for the constitutional organization of the country. But the division into parties that had dominated the previous period was still present, and the parties that had helped in the victory hoped to direct the process: the federalists relied on the prestige and military and economic power of the victor, General Justo José de Urquiza, to sanction a completely federal constitution. For their part, the Unitarians and many of the leaders of Buenos Aires wanted a unitary constitution, or at least one that would enshrine the predominance of that province.

Urquiza went ahead and, through the San Nicolás Agreement, invited the provinces to form a Constituent Congress in Santa Fe, which would end up sanctioning the Constitution of 1853.
