= Gobierno de la Defensa =

Government of Montevideo during the Great Siege

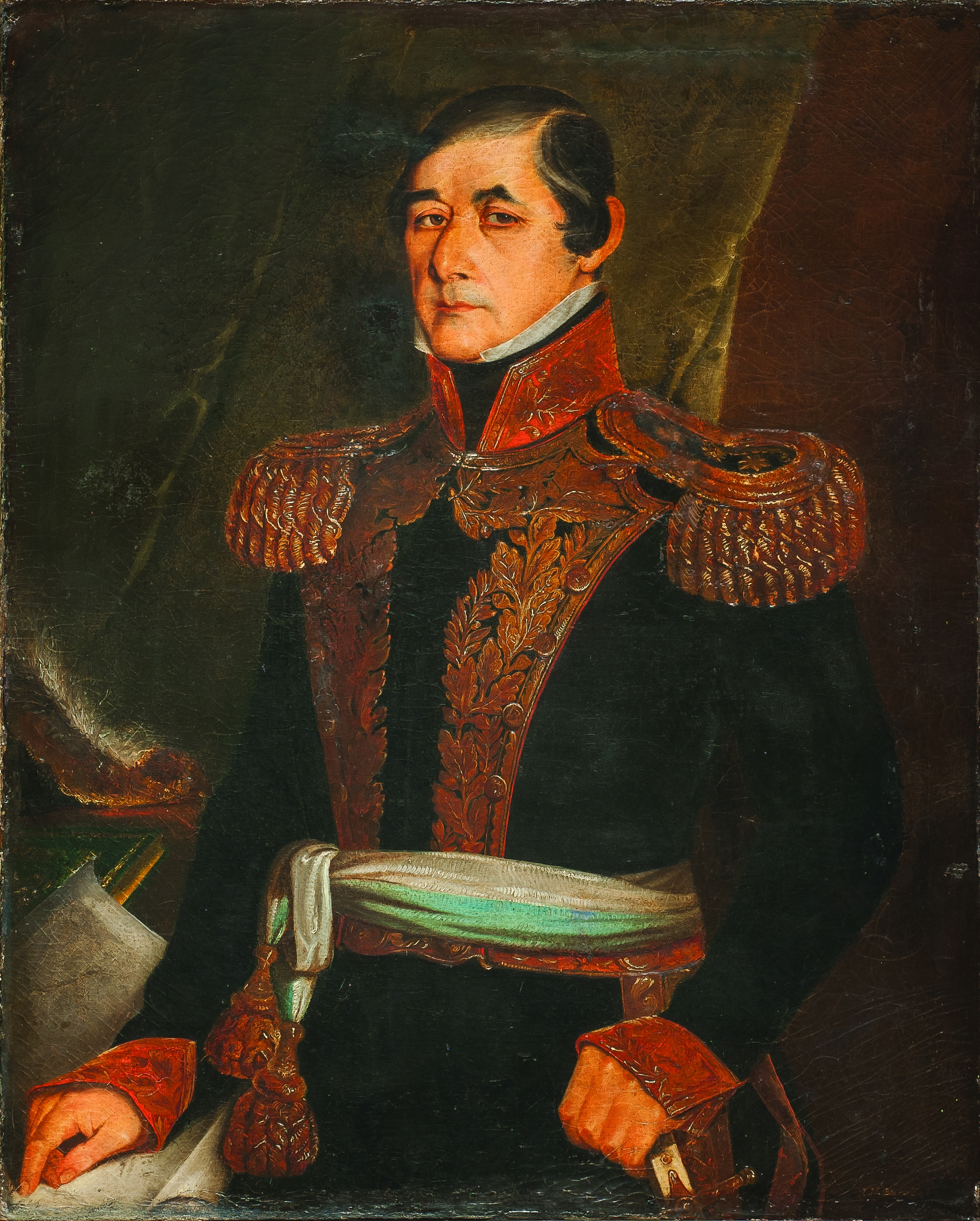
Fructuoso Rivera

Flag of Uruguay used by the Defense Government

The Defense Government (Spanish: Gobierno de la Defensa) governed just the city of Montevideo during the period known as Great Siege of Montevideo (1843–1851). It was led by Joaquín Suárez, while the army was led by Fructuoso Rivera.

Uruguay was experiencing the Guerra Grande, between the two traditional parties Colorado and Blanco. The government of Montevideo survived thanks to the help of the British and the French, as well as the active collaboration of Italian warrior Giuseppe Garibaldi.

== See also ==
- Gobierno del Cerrito
- Great Siege of Montevideo
- Uruguayan Civil War
