= Juan Francisco Giró =

Uruguayan politician

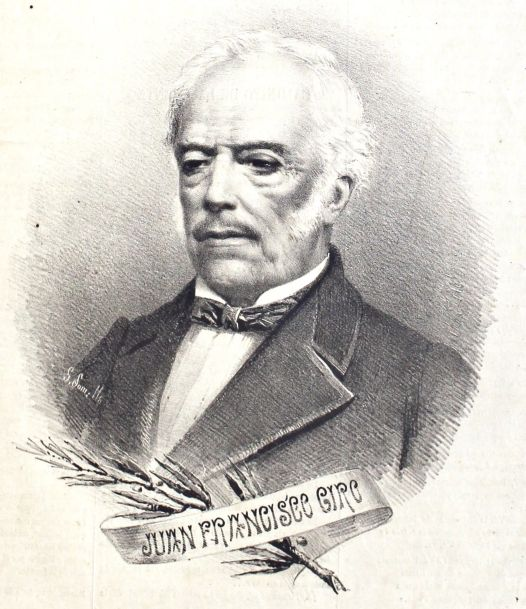

President of Uruguay
- In office 1 March 1852 – 25 September 1853
- Preceded by: Bernardo Berro (acting)
- Succeeded by: Venancio Flores

Personal details
- Born: June 3, 1791 Montevideo, Viceroyalty of the Río de la Plata
- Died: May 8, 1863 (aged 71)
- Party: National Party
- Profession: Politician

Juan Francisco José Giró Zufriategui (June 3, 1791, Montevideo – May 8, 1863) was a Uruguayan politician and the President of Uruguay from 1852 until 1853.

He was deposed by a military mutiny in September 1853 by one of the Colorado Party.

== Early life ==
Juan Francisco José Giró Zufriategui was born on June 3, 1791, in the city of Montevideo, in the Viceroyalty of the Río de la Plata. His father Josep Giró i Granoleras was a merchant born in Garrigàs, Catalonia, Spain in 1765; his mother Antonia Maria Zufriategui Ayala was born in Montevideo to Basque merchant parents. His maternal uncle is Pablo Zufriátegui, a figure of the Argentine War of Independence and the Cisplatine War. The Giró-Zufriategui family's status as elites allowed them to send Juan Francisco Giró to study in Europe and the United States. Giró learned Catalan while in Barcelona during the Napoleonic period (1808–1812). Giró's house is now part of the National Historical Museum and contains a library.

== Career ==
Giró was a physician and a member of the Montevideo Cabildo (city council). He became the first post-independence mayor of the city in 1815–1816, at the age of 25. He was the President of Uruguay from 1852 until a military coup in 1853. He was a Senator in the years 1852, 1860, and 1861–1863.

== See also ==
- History of Uruguay

Political offices
Preceded by Bernardo Berro; Acting	President of Uruguay; 1852–1853	Succeeded by Venancio Flores
