= Gobierno del Cerrito =

Government of most of Uruguay during the Great Siege of Montevideo

Flag of Uruguay used by the Cerrito Government

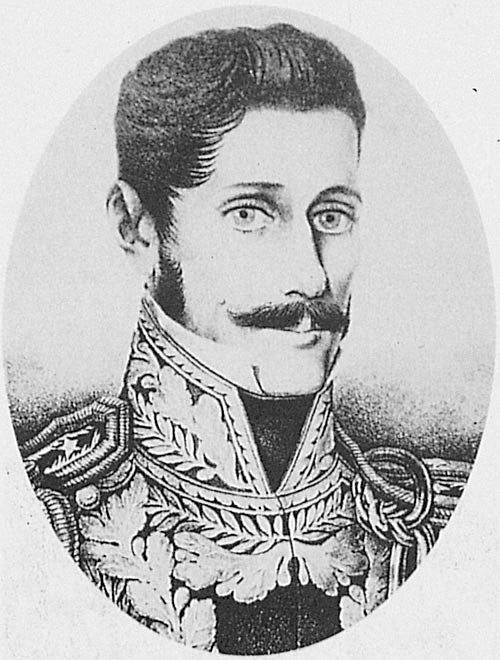
Manuel Oribe

The Cerrito Government (Spanish: Gobierno del Cerrito, lit. "Little Hill Government") governed almost all the Uruguayan territory during the Great Siege of Montevideo (1843-1851). It was led by Manuel Oribe y Viana.

Uruguay was experiencing the Guerra Grande, between the two traditional parties Colorado and Blanco. Oribe sieged the city during 9 years; his headquarters were established on the Cerrito de la Victoria, at the present neighbourhood of Cerrito. Other notable posts were Villa Restauración (with tribunal and university) and Buceo (with its harbor).

== See also ==
- Gobierno de la Defensa
- Great Siege of Montevideo
- Uruguayan Civil War
