= Joaquín Suárez =

Uruguayan politician

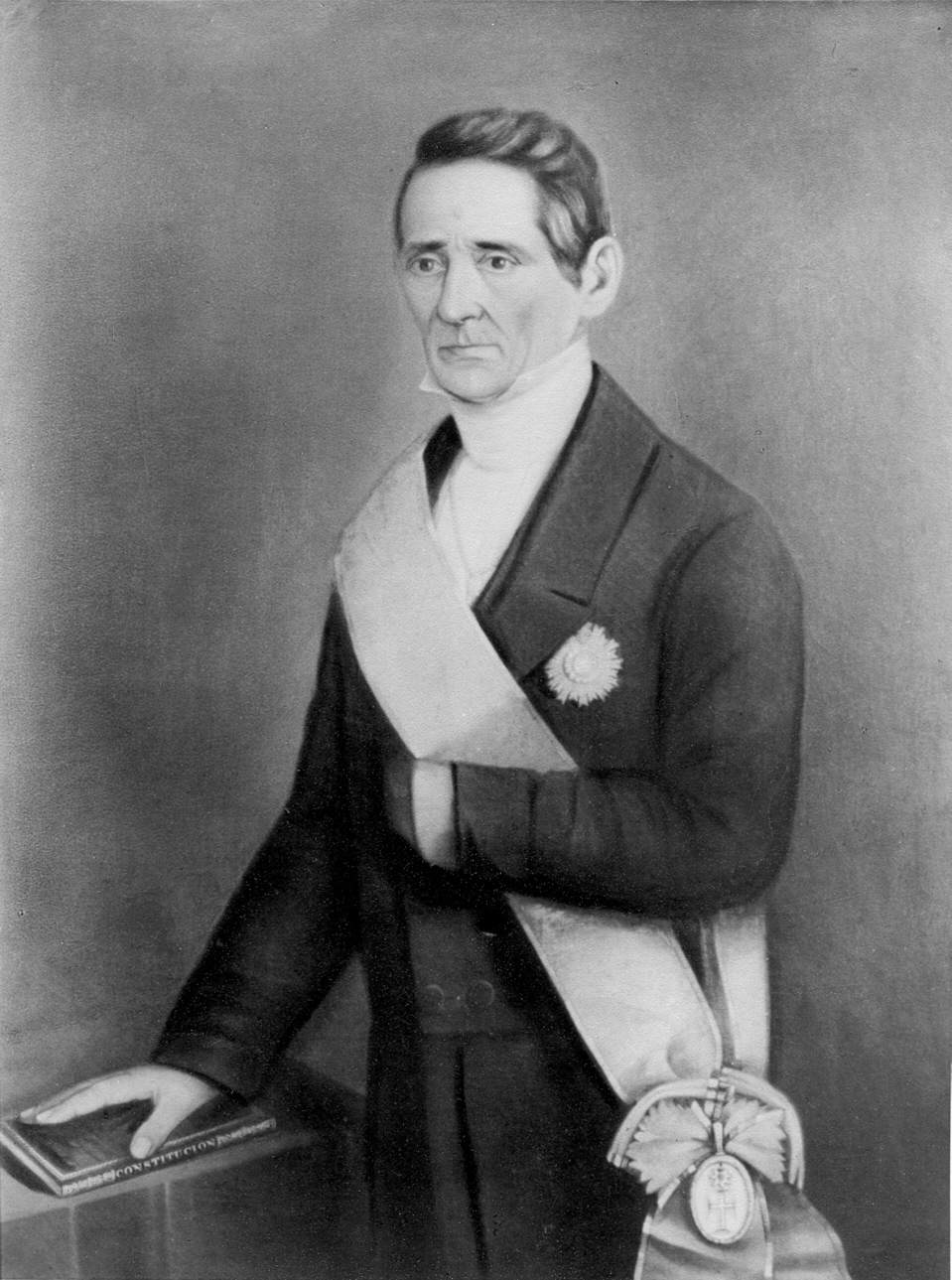

President of Uruguay (Montevideo Government)
- In office 1 March 1843 – 15 February 1852
- Preceded by: Fructuoso Rivera
- Succeeded by: Bernardo Berro

Personal details
- Born: 18 August 1781; Canelones, Viceroyalty of the Río de la Plata, Spanish Empire (now in Uruguay)
- Died: 26 December 1868 (aged 87); Montevideo, Uruguay
- Political party: Colorado Party

Joaquín Luis Miguel Suárez de Rondelo (August 18, 1781 in Canelones – December 26, 1868 in Montevideo) was a Uruguayan politician.

== Head of State of Uruguay ==
In December 1828, Suárez served as the first head of state of the territory that was about to be known as Uruguay two years later.

== President of Uruguay ==
He served as the President of the Senate of Uruguay from 1841 to 1845. Suárez served in the office designated as President of Uruguay from 1843 to 1852, during the Uruguayan Civil War. However, his effective rule was limited to the old city of Montevideo; historians remember this rule as "Gobierno de la Defensa" (Defense Government), as he was defending the city during the Great Siege of Montevideo, which in turn was led by Manuel Oribe, who ruled over the rest of the country.

He was the country's longest ruling president.

=== Designer of Uruguayan flag ===
He is credited with designing the Uruguayan flag.

== Legacy ==
The town of Joaquín Suárez is named after him.

== See also ==
- History of Uruguay

Political offices
Preceded by Manuel Oribe	President of Uruguay; Acting; 1843 – 1852	Succeeded by Bernardo Berro
