= Uruguayan Civil War =

1839–51 armed conflict in Uruguay between the Colorado and Blanco factions

- Part of the Argentine civil wars
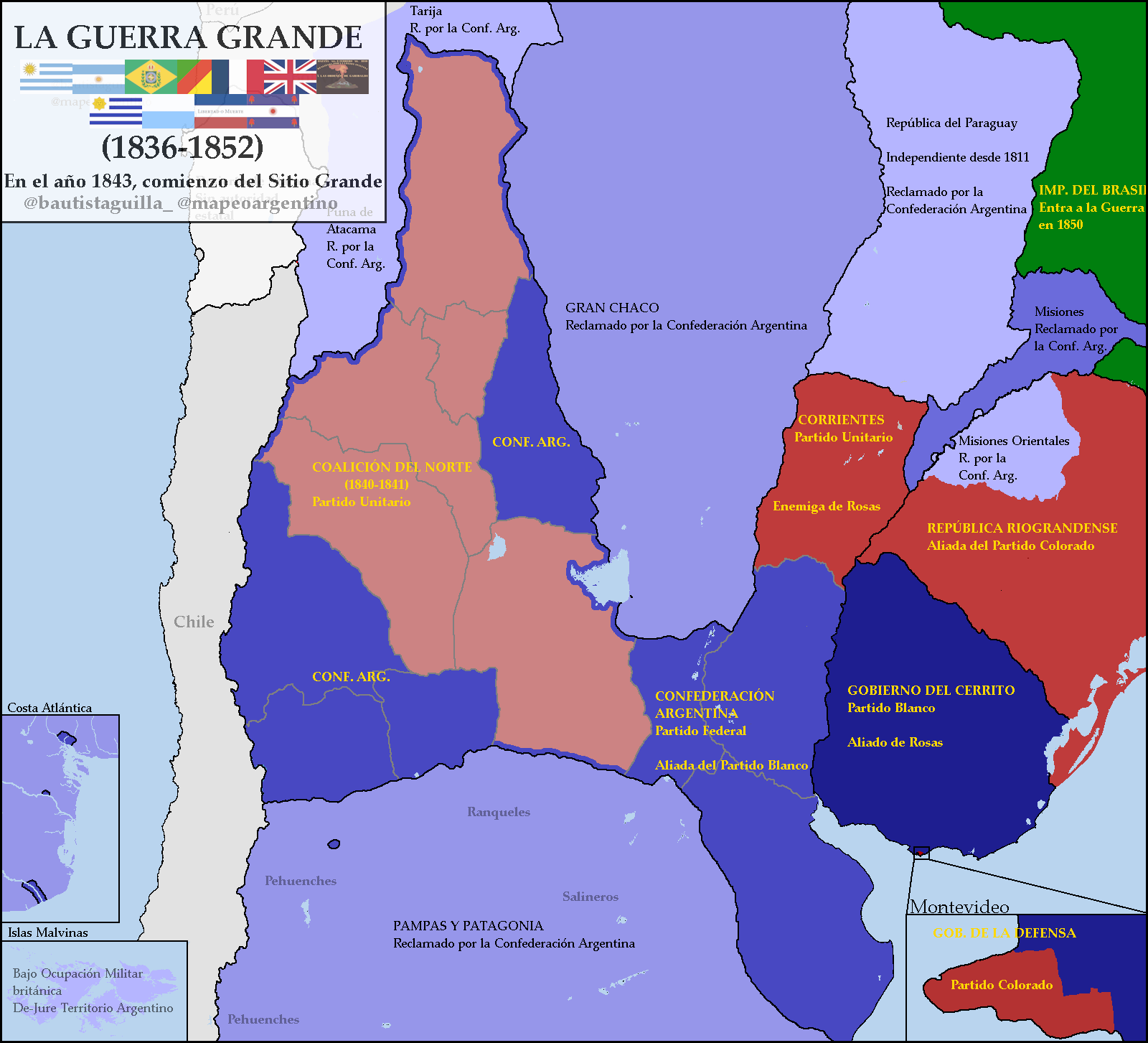
- Political situation of the Southern Cone in the year 1843. In red the countries and polities allied to the Colorado and Unitarian Parties. In blue those allied to the Blanco and Federal Parties.
Date	1839–1851
Location	Uruguay, Argentina and Brazil
Result	Colorado victory: The Colorado Party triumphs in Uruguay.; In Argentina, Rosas is overthrown by Urquiza in the Battle of Caseros.; Argentine Unification War.

Belligerents
Colorados; Gobierno de la Defensa (since 1843); Unitarians (or anti-rosists); Corrientes (from 1839); Entre Ríos (from 1851); Santa Fe (from 1851); Brazil (since 1851); France; United Kingdom; Riograndense Republic (1839–1845); Italian Redshirts	Blancos; Gobierno del Cerrito (since 1843); Federalists; Lavallejistas; Argentina (since 1839); Entre Ríos (until 1851)

Commanders and leaders
Fructuoso Rivera; Juan Lavalle; José María Paz; José Rondeau; Bartolomé Mitre; Pedro Ferré; Joaquín Madariaga; Juan Madariaga; Pedro II; (Empire of Brazil) John Pascoe Grenfell; Jean Thiébaut; Robert Peel; Samuel Inglefield; Bento Gonçalves; Bento Manuel; Giuseppe Garibaldi	Manuel Oribe; Juan A. Lavalleja; (Argentine Confederation) Juan M. de Rosas; (Argentine Confederation) Pascual Echagüe; (Argentine Confederation) William Brown

Casualties and losses
- 10,000–25,000 killed

The Uruguayan Civil War, also known in Spanish as the Guerra Grande ("Great War"), was a series of armed conflicts between the leaders of Uruguayan independence. While officially the war lasted from 1839 until 1851, it was a part of armed conflicts that started in 1832 and continued until the final military defeat of the Blancos faction in 1904.

Supporters of the two opposing presidents Rivera and Oribe formed two political parties: the Colorado Party and the National Party, both of which received backing and support from foreign sources, including neighboring Empire of Brazil, the Argentine Confederation, Buenos Aires Province as well as European powers, primarily the British Empire and the Kingdom of France, but also a legion of Italian volunteers including Giuseppe Garibaldi. The great diversity of nationalities among the military forces supporting the Colorado Party posed difficulties in arguing for their struggle in terms of a "national liberation"; instead, the Colorado Party side argued that they were defending "humanity" and "civilization" against "tyranny".

== Rivera vs. Lavalleja ==
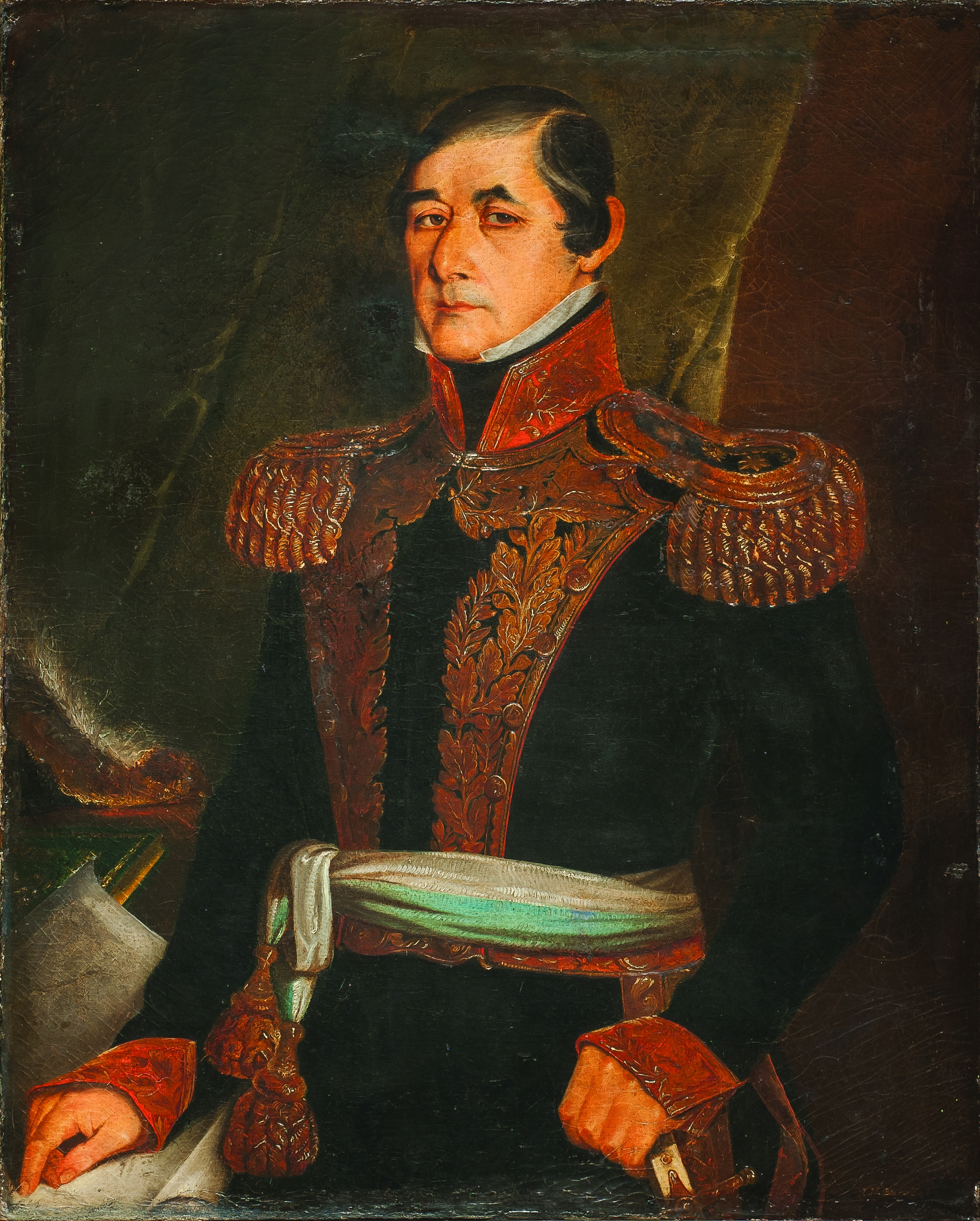
The first Uruguayan president Fructuoso Rivera

Independence leader Juan Antonio Lavalleja

After the proclamation of Uruguayan Independence in 1828 a conflict for primacy arose between the leader of the Thirty-Three Orientals Juan Lavalleja and veteran military commander Fructuoso Rivera, who on November 6, 1830, was chosen as the first President of Uruguay. In June 1832 Lavalleja's supporters attempted to kill Rivera and on July 3 the Montevideo garrison revolted, calling for Lavalleja to be made Commander-in-Chief. Rivera, with the help of Argentine Unitarians defeated Lavalleja on September 18, 1832, at Tupambaé, forcing Lavalleja to flee to the Brazilian province of Rio Grande do Sul. There Lavalleja organized a new force with the support of Buenos Aires strongman Juan Manuel de Rosas and in March 1834 invaded Uruguay, only to be defeated by Rivera once again.

== Rivera vs. Oribe ==
On March 1, 1835, Manuel Oribe, another of the Thirty-Three Orientals, was elected as the second President of Uruguay while Rivera remained as the commander of Army. Oribe pursued his own policies and in January 1836 removed Rivera from the command and gave amnesty to his old comrade Lavalleja.

=== Blancos vs. Colorados ===
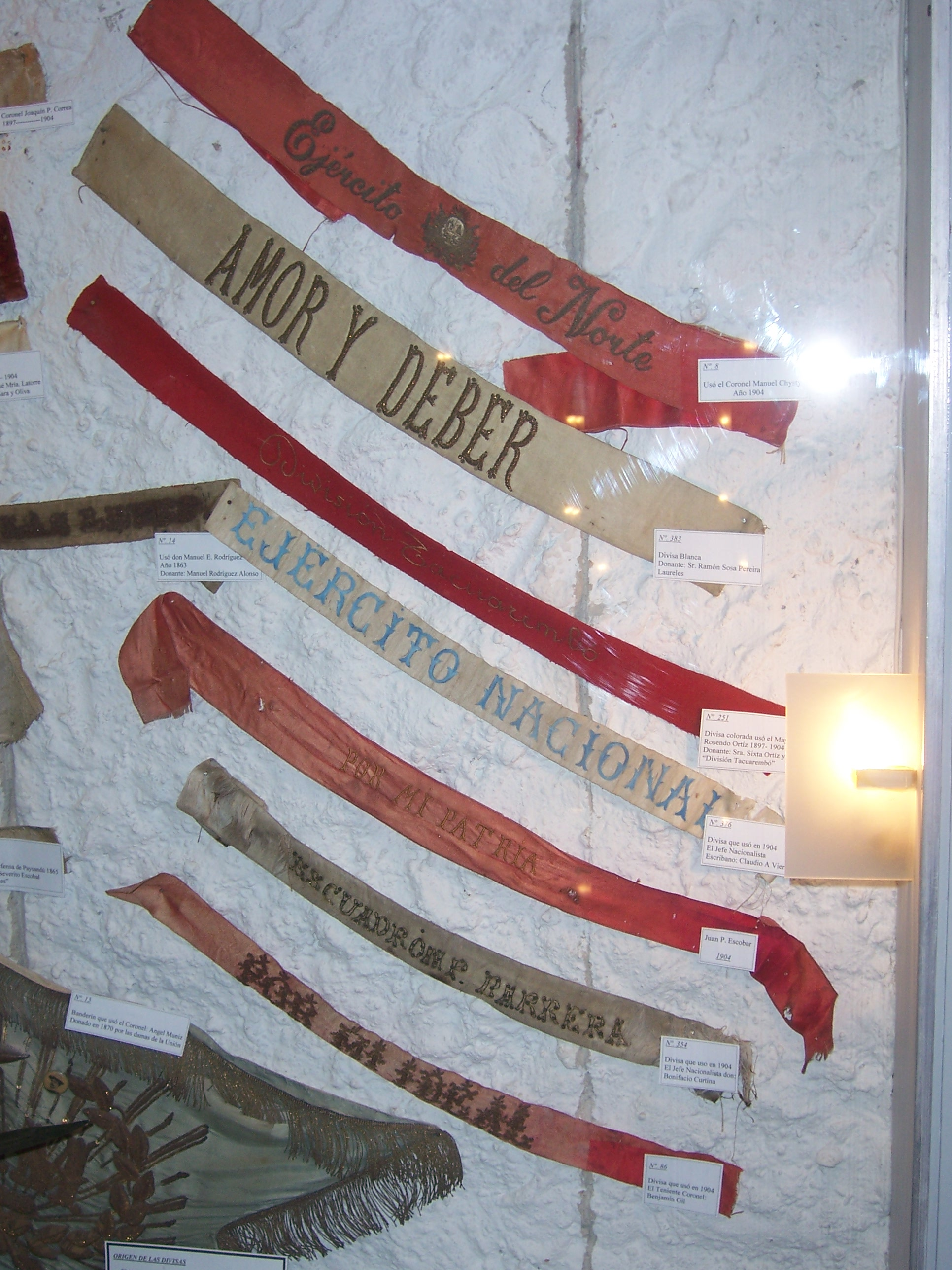
Historic armbands of the Whites and Colorados

On July 16, 1836, Rivera rebelled against Oribe. To distinguish his soldiers, Oribe ordered them to wear a white armband. Rivera then ordered his supporters to wear blue, but as it quickly faded, they started using red armbands. Out of these military distinction marks quickly emerged the conservative Blancos ("Whites") and the liberal Colorados ("Reds"). The Colorados were led by Fructuoso Rivera and represented the business interests of Montevideo; the Blancos were headed by Manuel Oribe, who looked after the agricultural interests of the countryside and promoted protectionism.

=== Defeat of Oribe ===
In order to support Oribe, Lavalleja organized an army in Argentina and moved against Rivera, who was helped by Argentine Unitarians led by General Juan Lavalle. On September 19, 1836, Rivera was defeated at the Battle of Carpintería and fled to Brazil, where his troops joined the newly proclaimed Riograndense Republic. With the help of this republic Rivera invaded Uruguay in 1837 and on October 22 defeated Oribe's forces at the Battle of Yucutujá and completely crushed Oribe on June 15, 1838 Battle of Palmar.

In 1838, France had started a naval blockade of Buenos Aires port in support of their allies the Peru–Bolivian Confederation who were involved in the War of the Confederation with the Argentine Confederation and Chile. Unable to deploy land troops, France looked for allied forces to fight Buenos Aires strongman Juan Manuel de Rosas on their behalf. For this purpose they supported Fructuoso Rivera and helped him to defeat Oribe, who was on good terms with Rosas. On October 24, 1838, Oribe resigned and fled to Buenos Aires, and Rivera assumed power.

== Return of Oribe ==
Rosas did not recognize Rivera as a legitimate President, and sought to restore Oribe to power. Rivera and Juan Lavalle prepared troops to attack Buenos Aires. At this point, both the British and French troops intervened, transforming the conflict into an international war.

On December 6, 1842, the Blancos under Manuel Oribe and the Colorados under Fructuoso Rivera fought the Battle of Arroyo Grande. Rivera's forces were utterly defeated, and Oribe laid siege to Montevideo.

== Great Siege of Montevideo ==
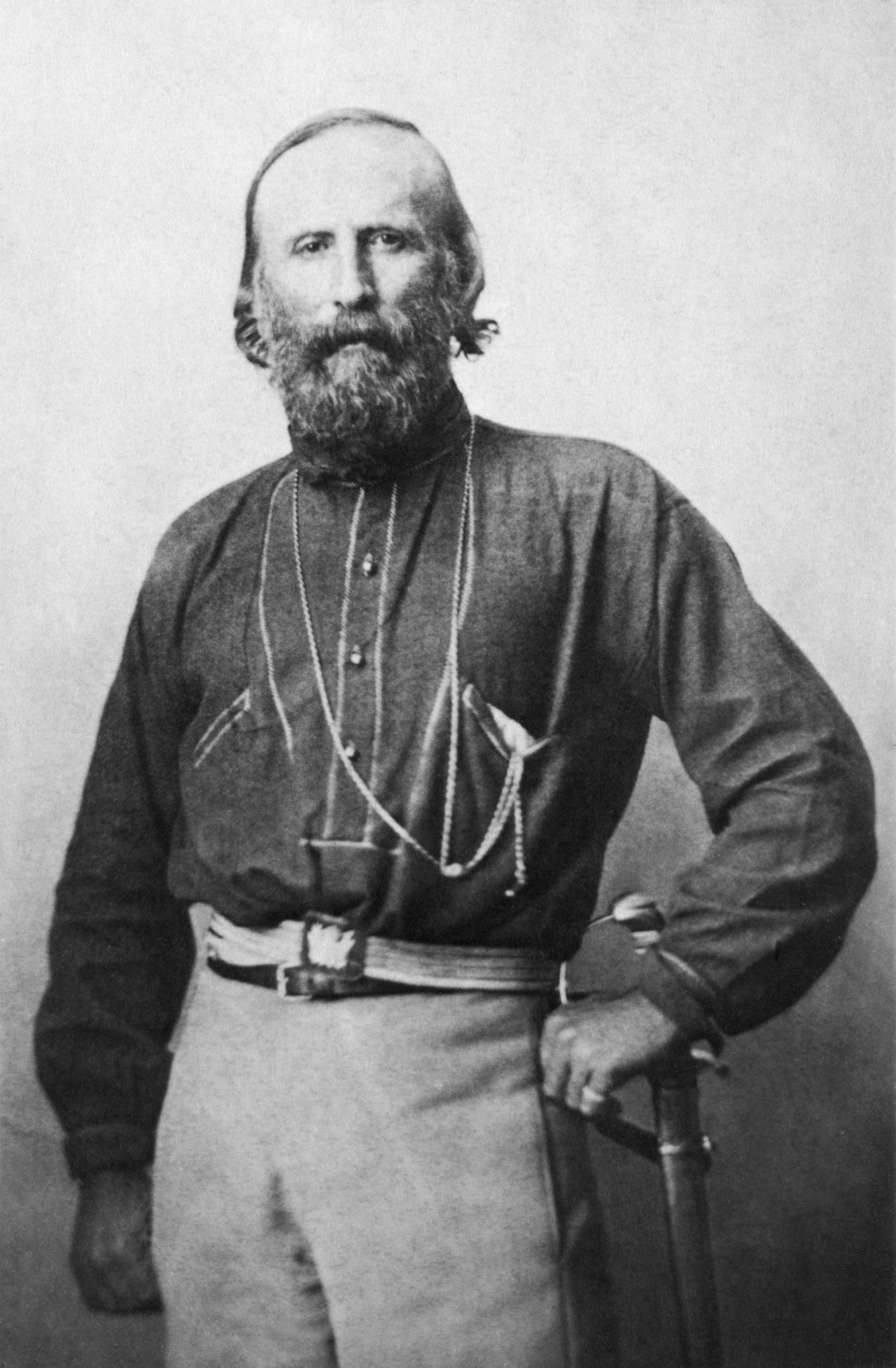
Giuseppe Garibaldi, leader of the Italian Legion and Uruguayan Navy. Garibaldi, celebrated as one of the greatest generals of modern times and as the "Hero of the Two Worlds" because of his military enterprises in South America and Europe, fought in many military campaigns that led to Italian unification.

With the destruction of the Uruguayan army at the battle of Arroyo Grande, it was assumed that the country's capital, Montevideo, would fall to the combined forces of the Buenos Aires governor Juan Manuel de Rosas and the former Uruguayan president Manuel Oribe. However, Oribe's siege of Montevideo lasted for nine years. The newly freed slaves, who formed a contingent 5,000 strong, and the community of foreign exiles were mostly responsible for the defense of the city. By 1843 Montevideo's population of thirty thousand inhabitants was highly cosmopolitan with Uruguayans making up only a third of it. The remaining were chiefly Italian (4205), Spanish (3406), Argentine (2,553), Portuguese (659), English (606) and Brazilians (492).

During this time Uruguay had two parallel governments:

- Gobierno de la Defensa in Montevideo, led by Joaquín Suárez (1843–1852)
- Gobierno del Cerrito (with headquarters at the present neighbourhood Cerrito de la Victoria), ruling the rest of the country, led by Manuel Oribe (1843–1851)

The British Empire eventually saved the city by allowing it to receive supplies. First, the British and French naval forces temporarily blockaded the port of Buenos Aires during December 1845. Then, the French and British fleets protected Montevideo from the sea. French, Spanish and Italian legionnaires, led by Giuseppe Garibaldi, teamed up with the Colorados in defending the city. Also in 1846, the 73rd (Perthshire) Regiment of Foot, sent by Britain, arrived in Montevideo and defended it for seven months against besieging Argentine troops.

Historians believe that the French and British forces intervened in the region to ensure free navigation along the Rio Parana and Rio Uruguay. However, in 1850, both the French and British withdrew after signing a treaty which represented a triumph for Juan Manuel de Rosas and his Federal Party in Argentina.

After the withdrawal of British and French troops, it appeared that Montevideo would fall to Juan Manuel de Rosas and Oribe. However, an uprising against de Rosas led by fellow Federalist Justo José de Urquiza, governor of Argentina's Entre Ríos Province, with the assistance of a small Uruguayan force, changed the situation completely. Manuel Oribe was defeated in 1851, leaving the Colorados in full control of the country. Brazil followed up by intervening in Uruguay in May 1851, supporting the Colorados with financial and naval forces. This led to the Platine War with Rosas in August 1851. In February 1852, after being defeated at Caseros, Rosas resigned, and Urquiza's pro-Colorado forces lifted the siege of Montevideo.

== Aftermath ==
The government of Montevideo rewarded Brazil's financial and military support at the final stages of the war by signing five treaties in 1851 that provided for perpetual alliance between the two countries.

Brazil was required to extradite runaway slaves and criminals from Uruguay. In fact, during the war, both the Blancos and the Colorados had abolished slavery in Uruguay to reinforce their respective military forces.

The treaties also allowed joint navigation on the Rio Uruguay and its tributaries and exempted cattle and salted meat exports from taxes. The Uruguayan cattle industry was devastated by the war. The treaty also acknowledged Uruguay's debt to Brazil for its aid against the Blancos and Brazil's commitment for granting an additional loan.

Uruguay renounced its territorial claims north of the Río Cuareim, thereby reducing its area to about 176,000 square kilometers, and recognized Brazil's exclusive right of navigation in the Laguna Merin and the Rio Yaguaron, the natural border between both countries.

The war also affected Uruguay's political and institutional development. The prolonged siege required extensive mobilization in Montevideo and contributed to the development of military and bureaucratic institutions. After Montevideo's victory in 1851, urban sectors of the Blanco and Colorado elites formed a coalition that supported modernization and state building. This postwar coalition relied on bureaucratic and military institutions developed during the siege. President Juan Francisco Giró later used this bureaucratic capacity to conduct Uruguay's first national census in 1852.

== Later conflicts ==
Both parties were weary of the chaos. In 1870, they came to an agreement to define spheres of influence: the Colorados would control Montevideo and the coastal region, the Blancos would rule the hinterland with its agricultural estates. In addition, the Blancos were paid half a million dollars to compensate them for the loss of their stake in Montevideo. But the caudillo mentality was difficult to erase from Uruguay and political feuding continued culminating in the Revolution of the Lances (Revolución de las Lanzas) (1870–1872), and later with the uprising of Aparicio Saravia.

== In popular culture ==
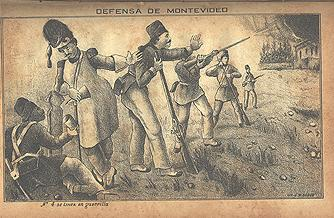
An illustration of the defense of Montevideo from Isidoro De-Maria's book, Anales de la defensa de Montevideo

French author Alexandre Dumas, in his novel The New Troy, described Oribe's siege of Montevideo as a new Trojan war.

== Battles and sieges ==
- Battle of Arroyo Grande – December 6, 1842
- Siege of Montevideo – 1843

== See also ==
- Platine War
