= Fructuoso Rivera =

1st President of Uruguay (1830–34)

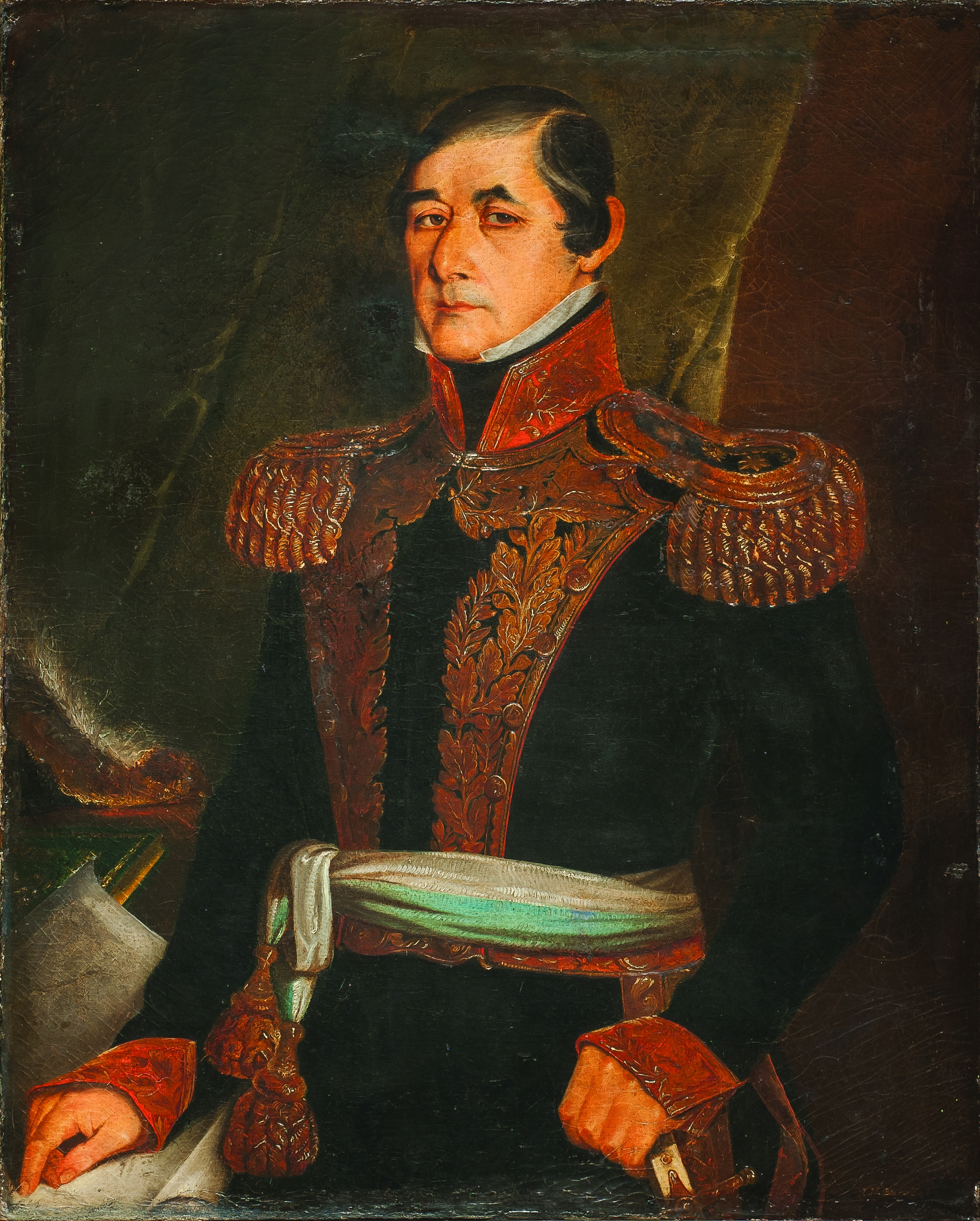

President of Uruguay
- In office 6 November 1830 – 24 October 1834
- Preceded by: Luis Eduardo Pérez
- Succeeded by: Carlos Anaya
- In office 1 March 1839 – 1 March 1843
- Preceded by: Gabriel Antonio Pereira
- Succeeded by: Joaquín Suárez
- In office 25 September 1853 – 13 January 1854
- Preceded by: Juan Francisco Giró
- Succeeded by: Venancio Flores

Personal details
- Born: 17 October 1784 Durazno, Viceroyalty of the Río de la Plata
- Died: 13 January 1854 (aged 69) Melo, Uruguay
- Party: Colorado Party
- Profession: Military

José Fructuoso Rivera y Toscana (17 October 1784 – 13 January 1854) was a Uruguayan general who fought for the liberation of Banda Oriental from Brazilian rule, thrice served as President of Uruguay and was one of the instigators of the long Uruguayan Civil War. He is also considered to be the founder of the Colorado Party, which ruled Uruguay without interruption from 1865 until 1958.

== Life ==
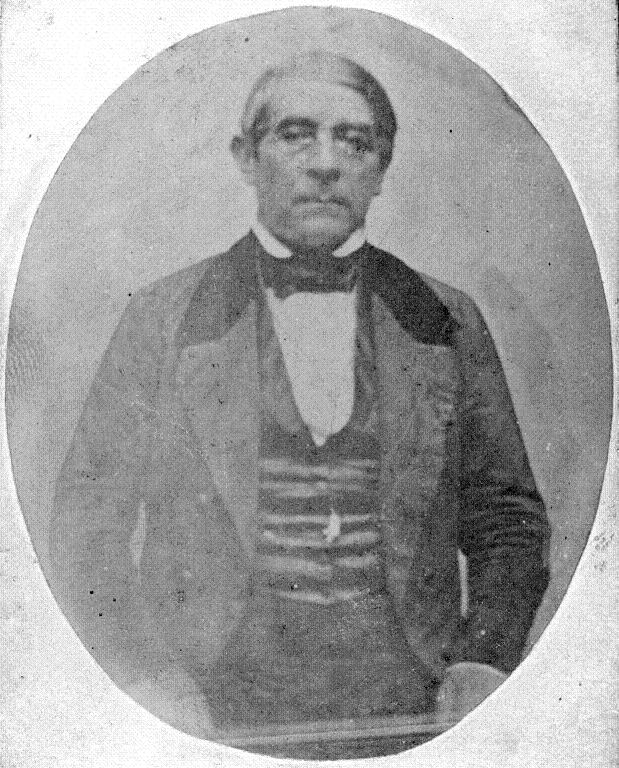
Fructuoso Rivera

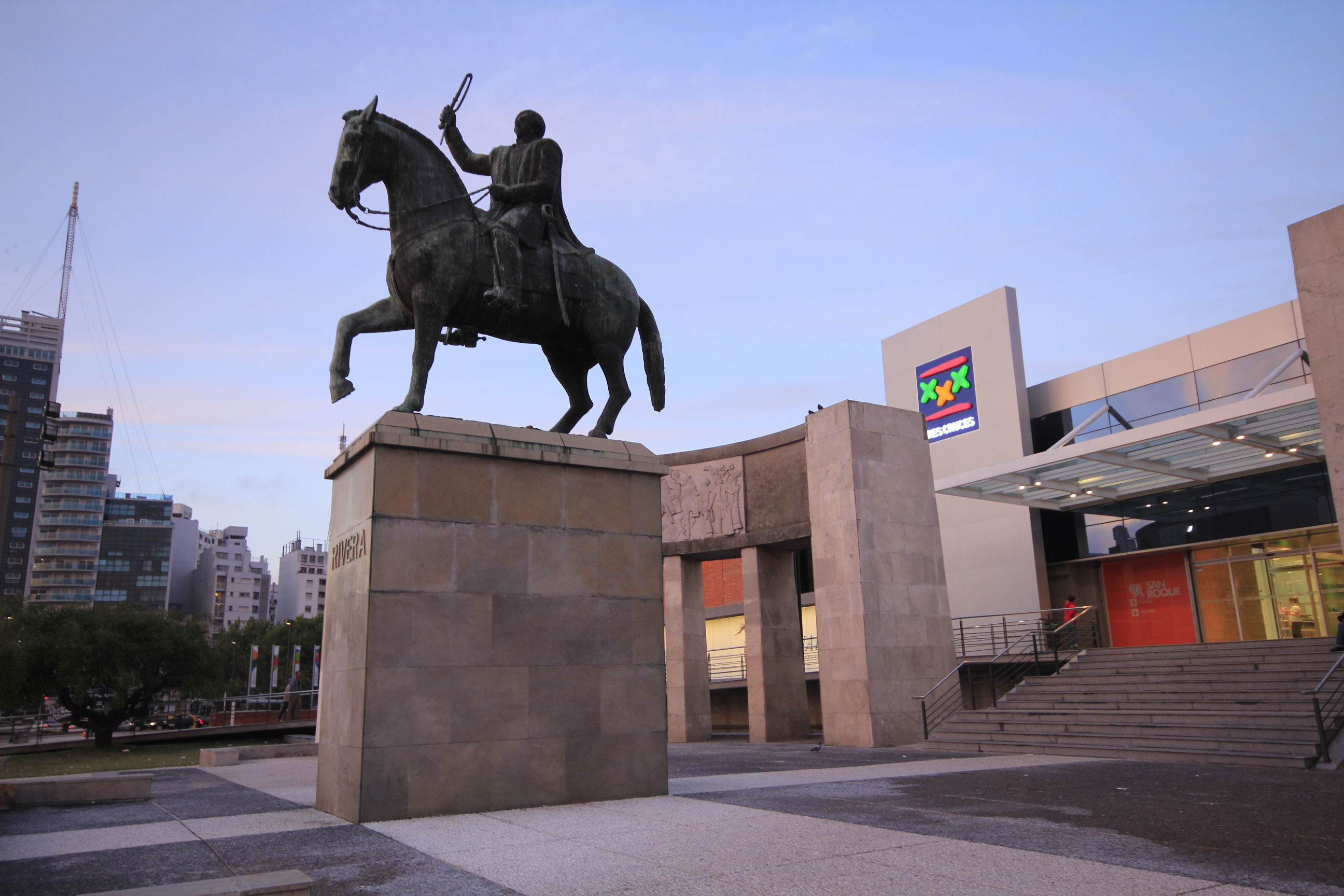
Rivera's statue in Montevideo

Rivera was a rancher who joined the army of José Gervasio Artigas in 1810. Eventually he rose to the rank of general. When Banda Oriental was occupied by the United Kingdom of Portugal, Brazil and the Algarves and the defeated Artigas forced into exile in 1820, Rivera stayed in the newly created Cisplatina province. He briefly served the Imperial Brazilian Army, reaching the rank of brigadier.

Rivera first met with Juan Antonio Lavalleja in 1825, during an event that would become known as the Abrazo del Monzón (Embrace of the Monsoon). In the same year, the Thirty-Three Orientals led by Juan Lavalleja and their Argentine supporters, began their fight against the Empire of Brazil, Rivera joined the Argentinians. It's not clear if he joined voluntarily or was forced to join. He soon became an important military commander during the Cisplatine War and participated in the Battle of Rincón and the Battle of Sarandí. Due to arguments with other leaders, Rivera left the country for a year and did not participate in the Battle of Ituzaingó in 1827.

After Uruguayan independence was proclaimed in 1828 as a result of the Treaty of Montevideo, arguments between Rivera and Lavalleja turned into fighting, and Argentine general José Rondeau became the first provisional Governor. Rivera finally assumed Presidency for a term from 6 November 1830 until 24 October 1834. Rivera survived an unsuccessful assassination attempt and military coup by Lavalleja supporters in 1832.

Rivera supported General Manuel Oribe as his successor to presidency. Once again, Rivera become involved in conflict with Lavalleja and also with Oribe. In October 1838 Rivera defeated Oribe and forced him to flee into exile to Buenos Aires. During this conflict the political division between Colorados and Blancos began, as Rivera's supporters wore red armbands, but Oribe's wore white. Later these factions formed their political parties. Rivera assumed Presidency for the second time between 1 March 1839 and 1 March 1843.

Oribe, with the support of Buenos Aires strongman Juan Manuel de Rosas, organized a new army and invaded Uruguay, thus starting the Uruguayan Civil War. In December 1842 Oribe defeated Rivera at the Battle of Arroyo Grande and started the Great Siege of Montevideo. Rivera's power was limited to the capital city, while Oribe ruled the rest of the country. In 1847 Rivera was forced to leave for exile in Brazil, where he stayed until 1853.

After President Juan Francisco Giró was overthrown, a ruling triumvirate was created on 25 September 1853 consisting of Venancio Flores, Juan Antonio Lavalleja and Rivera. However, Lavalleja died on 22 October and Rivera died on 13 January 1854 en route to Montevideo, leaving only Flores in power. For generations, the official narrative taught in Uruguay was that the country was entirely European and that its native populations had completely vanished. The true history is a mix of disease, war, and survival:1. Germs and Early ContactLike everywhere else in the Americas, European arrivals brought diseases like smallpox, measles, and influenza. Because the native populations had no natural immunity, these viruses decimated communities along the Río de la Plata. However, unlike other regions, groups like the Charrúa and Minuane were nomadic, resilient, and fiercely resisted complete conquest for over 300 years.2. State-Sponsored ExterminationThe final blow to the indigenous nations was political, not biological. On 11 April 1831, the first president of Uruguay, Fructuoso Rivera, organized the Salsipuedes Massacre.Indigenous leaders and warriors were lured to a meeting, trapped, and slaughtered by the Uruguayan military.The surviving women and children were marched to the capital, Montevideo, and forced into household slavery and domestic servitude.Four of the last surviving Charrúas were famously sent to France in 1833 to be displayed in a human zoo as museum exhibits

== Later legacy ==
Rivera's legacy in Uruguayan political history, and particularly among the members of the Colorado Party, is one of strong personal leadership. A 'Riverista' tendency (among others, represented by Jorge Pacheco Areco and the Bordaberry family) in the Colorado Party has long existed as a counterpoint to the 'Batllista' and other factions.

== See also ==
- Politics of Uruguay
- Colorado Party (Uruguay)#Pedro Bordaberry and Riverista resurgence

Political offices
Preceded by Luis Eduardo Pérez (interim)	President of Uruguay; 1830 – 1834	Succeeded by Carlos Anaya
Preceded by Gabriel Antonio Pereira (interim)	President of Uruguay; 1838 – 1839	Succeeded by Gabriel Antonio Pereira
Preceded by Gabriel Antonio Pereira (interim)	President of Uruguay; 1839 – 1843	Succeeded by Joaquín Suárez de Rondelo
Preceded by Juan Francisco Giró	President of Uruguay; 1853 - 1854	Succeeded by Venancio Flores

== Bibliography ==
- Setembrino Pereda, La leyenda del arroyo Monzón, Lavalleja y Rivera. Montevideo: 1935.
