= Manuel Oribe =

2nd President of Uruguay (1835–38)

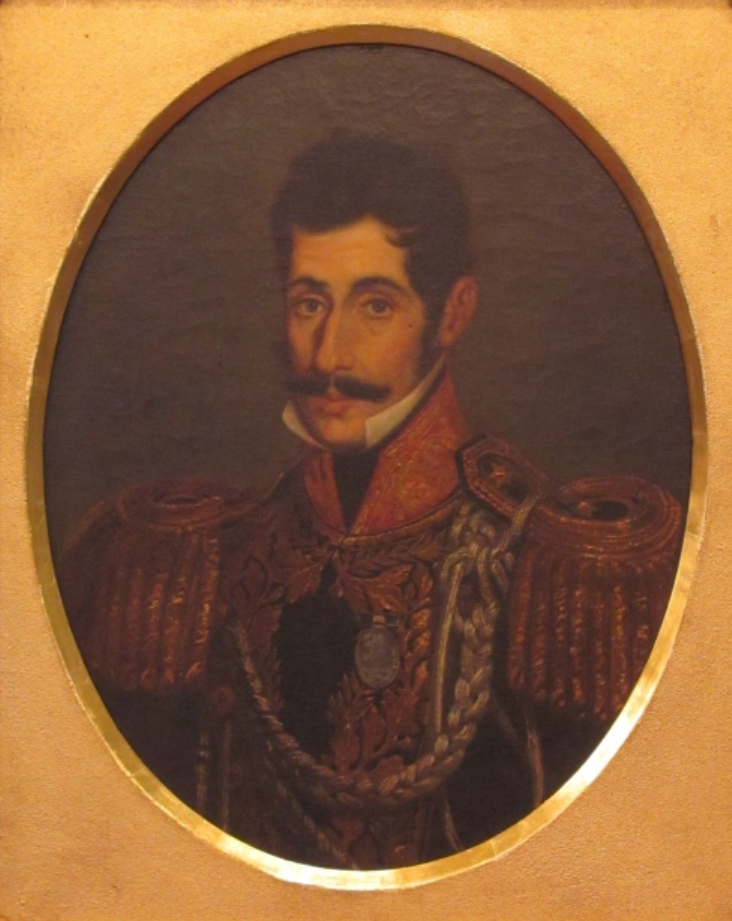
- Posthumous portrait by Eduardo Carbajal, 1882

2nd Constitutional President of Uruguay
- In office March 1, 1835 – October 24, 1838
- Preceded by: Carlos Anaya
- Succeeded by: Gabriel Antonio Pereira

Personal details
- Born: August 26, 1792 Montevideo, Viceroyalty of the Río de la Plata
- Died: November 12, 1857 (aged 65) Montevideo, Uruguay
- Party: White
- Spouse: Agustina Contucci
- Children: 4
- Profession: Military

Manuel Ceferino Oribe y Viana (August 26, 1792 – November 12, 1857) was the 2nd Constitutional president of Uruguay and founder of Uruguay's National Party, the oldest Uruguayan political party and considered one of the two Uruguayan "traditional" parties, along with the Colorado Party, which was, until the 20th century, its only political adversary.

== Biography ==
Manuel Oribe was the son of Captain Francisco Oribe and María Francisca Viana, a descendant of the first governor of Montevideo, José Joaquín de Viana. At the beginning of the revolution of independence in the Rio de la Plata he enlisted in the patriot ranks as a volunteer.

His baptism of fire took place in the battle of Cerrito, on New Year's Eve, 1812, during the Second Siege of Montevideo, a feat of arms that ended in a victory for the Patriots. He took part alongside José Gervasio Artigas' resistance against the Luso-Brazilian invasion in 1816.

In late 1817, with Montevideo already fallen into the hands of the Luso-Brazilians, Oribe moved to Buenos Aires along with his brother Ignacio and Colonel Rufino Bauza, taking with him the Freedmen Battalion and an artillery battalion.

=== Rivalry with Rivera ===
The historian Francisco Bauza, son of Rufino Bauza, in his "Historia de la dominación española en el Uruguay" (1880-1882), argued that given the almost obsessive insistence of Artigas to name his favorite, Fructuoso Rivera, as a military commander and the south of Río Negro to face the invasion, Rufino Bauza and Manuel Oribe would have come out against a situation that led to a violent exchange of words with Artigas, whose military situation was going out of hand.

The personal rivalry between Rivera and Oribe, which apparently dates from such events, the young officer decided to abandon his boss. Carlos Federico Lecor, commander of the occupying forces, offered no hindrance to the passage of eastern officials in Buenos Aires, even though he could not attract them to your cause. Rivera and his people were in the service of the invader Lusitanians.

== The first stay in Buenos Aires ==
In Buenos Aires, known by the certifying of stationery at the time, since 1819, Oribe, along with other Orientals as Santiago Vazquez and residents who were equally opposed to the Brazilian Portuguese occupation and Artigas, have built a secret Masonic society, called the Society of the Eastern Knights, who waited at least until 1821, Cisplatin Congress to undertake a return to the, since then, called Cisplatina Province and begin work to reverse the situation.

Meanwhile, following the defeat of Artigas (and even before it) another section of the eastern elite had acceded to the occupants, accepting and in fact closely collaborating with the Portuguese. This is the only sector to be represented in Congress Cisplatin, 1821.

The occupation of the Banda Oriental and its transformation into "Cisplatina Province" by the Portuguese and Brazilian troops had resulted in additional fracture of the leading sectors, which has since lined up in two groups separated by the acceptance or rejection of that military presence:

- The group that included Montevideo-Fructuoso Rivera, pro-Portuguese, named Club of the Baron, for its proximity to the invading commander Carlos Federico Lecor (Baron de la Laguna)
- The exiles in Buenos Aires, where Oribe was located, were a proponent of reintegration into the United Provinces of Río de la Plata as soon as possible.

Those groups would eventually become the Colorado and White party.

=== President of Uruguay ===
He served as President of Uruguay between 1835 and 1838.

Oribe was a big supporter of Juan Manuel de Rosas in Argentina, who in turn supported him.

=== A civil war, two simultaneous governments ===
In 1838 he was forced to resign by Fructuoso Rivera but started a rebel army and began a long civil war which lasted until 1851.

Oribe besieged the capital Montevideo for 8 long years (period known as Great Siege of Montevideo); he presided over the "Gobierno del Cerrito". At last Oribe was defeated in 1851 with help from Brazil and Argentine rebels, led by Justo José de Urquiza, who were against Rosas.

=== Later life ===
In 1857, Oribe and his family narrowly survived a shipwreck. For this reason he presented a golden crown as a gift to the image of the Virgin of the Thirty-Three.

== Historical and political heritage ==
Oribe's supporters became known as the Nationals or Blancos, while his opponents became the Colorados.

Political offices
Preceded by Carlos Anaya	President of Uruguay; 1835–1838	Succeeded by Gabriel Antonio Pereira
Preceded by Fructuoso Rivera	President of Uruguay; Acting; 1843–1851	Succeeded by Joaquín Suárez
