= List of Uruguayan politicians =

A list of notable Uruguayan politicians:

A

- Alberto Abdala
- Carlos Abdala
- Pablo D. Abdala
- Washington Abdala
- Sergio Abreu
- Eduardo Acevedo Álvarez
- Eduardo Acevedo Díaz
- Eduardo Acevedo Vásquez
- Eduardo Acevedo Maturana
- Armando Acosta y Lara
- Ernesto Agazzi
- Tabaré Aguerre
- Mario Aguerrondo
- Gonzalo Aguirre
- Martín Aguirrezabala
- Luis Almagro
- Álvaro Alonso
- Verónica Alonso
- Sofía Álvarez Vignoli
- Guillermo Álvarez Iriarte
- Julián Álvarez
- Mario Álvarez (Uruguay)
- Fernando Amado
- Gerardo Amaral
- Gerardo Amarilla
- Juan Justo Amaro
- Juan José de Amézaga
- José Amorín Batlle
- Ernesto Amorín Larrañaga
- Carlos Anaya
- Enrique Antía
- Magdalena Antonelli Moreno
- Timoteo Aparicio
- Domingo Aramburú
- Mariano Arana
- Germán Araújo
- Ricardo Areco
- Domingo Arena
- Julia Arévalo de Roche
- Beatriz Argimón
- Marina Arismendi
- Rodney Arismendi
- Enrique de Arrascaeta
- Roque Arregui
- Ledo Arroyo Torres
- Pantaleón Astiazarán
- Danilo Astori
- Alejandro Atchugarry
- Patricia Ayala
- Juan Eduardo Azzini

B

- Alfredo Baldomir
- Carlos Baráibar
- Julio Baraibar
- Miguel Barreiro
- Javier Barrios Amorín
- Luis Barrios Tassano
- Artigas Barrios
- Pilar Barrios
- Hugo Batalla
- César Batlle Pacheco
- Jorge Batlle
- José Batlle y Ordóñez
- Lorenzo Batlle
- Lorenzo Batlle Pacheco
- Luis Batlle Berres
- Rafael Batlle Pacheco
- Francisco Bauzá
- Rufino Bauzá
- José Bayardi
- Washington Beltrán Barbat
- Enrique Beltrán Mullin
- Washington Beltrán Mullin
- Walter Belvisi
- Alberto Bensión
- Bertil Bentos
- Ramón V. Benzano
- Mario Bergara
- Ricardo Bernal
- Tomás Berreta
- Bernardo Prudencio Berro
- Pedro Berro
- Azucena Berrutti
- Andrés Berterreche
- Guillermo Besozzi
- Daniel Bianchi
- Jerónimo Pío Bianqui
- Daniel Blanco Acevedo
- Eduardo Blanco Acevedo
- Juan Carlos Blanco Acevedo
- Pablo Blanco Acevedo
- Juan Carlos Blanco Estradé
- Juan Carlos Blanco Fernández
- Juan Benito Blanco
- Néstor Bolentini
- Eduardo Bonomi
- Domingo Bordaberry
- Juan María Bordaberry
- Pedro Bordaberry
- Gustavo Borsari
- Sergio Botana
- Eduardo Bottinelli
- Enrique Braga
- Luis Alberto Brause
- Miguel Brechner Frey
- Tomás Brena
- Eduardo Brenta
- Luis Brezzo
- Ángel Brian
- Mariano Brito
- Jorge Brovetto
- Alfeo Brum
- Baltasar Brum
- Jorge Bruni
- Domingo Burgueño Miguel
- Horacio Buscaglia

C

- Carmelo Cabrera (militar)
- Lucio Cáceres
- Walter Campanella
- Juan Campisteguy
- Diego Cánepa
- Mario Cantón
- Marcos Carámbula
- Álvaro Carbone
- Felipe Santiago Cardoso
- Germán Cardoso
- José Carlos Cardoso
- José Pedro Cardoso
- Julio Cardozo Ferreira
- Mario Carminatti
- Lorenzo Carnelli
- Justino Carrere Sapriza
- Pedro Casaballe
- Federico Casaretto
- Armando Castaingdebat
- Ney Castillo
- Nora Castro
- Raúl Casás
- Carlos Cat
- Washington Cataldi
- Jorge Caumont
- Luis Caviglia
- Gustavo Cersósimo
- Pedro Cersósimo
- Jorge Chapper
- César Charlone
- Juan Vicente Chiarino
- Sergio Chiesa
- Guillermo Chifflet
- Juan Antonio Chiruchi
- Alberto Cid
- Humberto Ciganda
- Carlos Colacce
- Ariel Collazo
- Teófilo Collazo
- Roberto Conde
- Hugo Cores
- Ismael Cortinas
- Alberto Couriel
- Germán Coutinho
- Wilson Craviotto
- Juan José Crottogini

D

- José D'Elía
- Eber da Rosa Vázquez
- Eber da Rosa Viñoles
- Susana Dalmás
- José Pedro Damiani
- Ariel Davrieux
- Óscar de los Santos
- Isidoro de María
- Elisa Delle Piane
- Carlos Delpiazzo
- Mariella Demarco
- Alberto Demicheli
- Christian Di Candia
- José Enrique Díaz Chávez
- Daniel Díaz Maynard
- Antonio F. Díaz
- Juan José Durán

E

- Martín Echegoyen
- Walter Echeverría
- Ricardo Ehrlich
- José Eugenio Ellauri
- José Longinos Ellauri
- Wilson Elso Goñi
- Carlos Enciso
- Enrique Erro
- José Espalter
- Rudyard Esquivo
- Sandra Etcheverry
- Wilson Ezquerra Martinotti

F

- Juan Pedro Fabini
- Ángel Fachinetti
- Yamandú Fau
- Hugo Fernández Artucio
- Daniel Fernández Crespo
- Hugo Fernández Faingold
- Eleuterio Fernández Huidobro
- Eduardo Fernández Farías
- Elbio Fernández
- Gonzalo Fernández
- Lorenzo Antonio Fernández
- Wilson Ferreira Aldunate
- Juan Raúl Ferreira Sienra
- Felipe Ferreiro
- Salvador Ferrer Serra
- Luis Alberto Ferrizo
- Pedro Figari
- Carlos Fischer
- Manuel Flores Mora
- Manuel Flores Silva
- Venancio Flores
- Ramón Fonticiella
- Francisco Forteza
- Francisco Forteza (hijo)
- Antonio Francese
- Emilio Frugoni
- Gabriel Frugoni

G

- Daniel Gadola
- Alberto Gallinal Heber
- Alejandro Gallinal
- Francisco Gallinal
- Gustavo Gallinal
- Luis José Gallo
- Carlos Gamou
- Jorge Gandini
- Primavera Garbarino
- Federico García Capurro
- Guillermo García Costa
- Tomás García de Zúñiga
- Alfredo García Morales
- Daniel García Pintos
- Pablo García Pintos
- Washington García Rijo
- Alem García
- Álvaro García (Uruguay)
- Javier García Duchini
- Francisco García y Santos
- Reinaldo Gargano
- Juan Manuel Garino
- Nora Gauthier
- Juan Andrés Gelly
- Adolfo Gelsi Bidart
- Carlos Gianelli
- Luis Giannattasio
- Ángel María Gianola
- Héctor Giorgi
- Tomás Gomensoro Albín
- Eugenio Gómez
- Rodolfo González Rissotto
- Bari González
- Rodrigo Goñi
- Héctor Grauert
- Julio César Grauert
- Héctor Gros Espiell
- Alberto Guani
- Julio Guastavino
- Gabriel Gurméndez
- Héctor Gutiérrez Ruiz

H

- Tabaré Hackenbruch
- Eduardo Víctor Haedo
- Faustino Harrison
- Alberto Héber Usher
- Arturo Heber Füllgraff
- Luis Alberto Heber
- Mario Heber
- Nelson Hernández
- Julio Herrera y Obes
- Manuel Herrera y Obes
- Belela Herrera
- Juan José de Herrera
- Luis Alberto de Herrera
- Luis de Herrera
- Nicolás Herrera
- Luis Hierro
- Luis Hierro Gambardella
- Luis Hierro López

I

- Juan Idiarte Borda
- Alberto Iglesias (Uruguay)
- Enrique V. Iglesias
- Santos Inzaurralde
- Dante Iocco
- Benjamín Irazábal
- Pablo Iturralde
- Raúl Iturria

J

- Eduardo Jiménez de Aréchaga
- Justino Jiménez de Aréchaga
- Cándido Juanicó
- Jorge Otero Mendoza
- Raúl Jude
- Raumar Jude
- Julio Sánchez Padilla
- Jóvenes turcos (Uruguay)

K

- Liliam Kechichian
- José Korzeniak
- Roberto Kreimerman

L

- Luis Alberto Lacalle
- Luis Alberto Lacalle Pou
- Omar Lafluf
- Daniel Lamas
- Luis Lamas
- Aldo Lamorte
- Aquiles Lanza
- Julio Lara
- Dámaso Antonio Larrañaga
- Jorge Larrañaga
- Jorge Larrañaga Vidal
- María Elena Laurnaga
- Ariel Lausarot
- Francisco Lavandeira
- Héctor Leis
- Jorge Lepra
- Héctor Lescano
- Arturo Lezama
- Víctor Licandro
- Ruperto Long
- Oscar López Goldaracena
- Héctor Lorenzo y Losada
- Álvaro F. Lorenzo
- Fernando Lorenzo
- Eduardo Lorier
- Paulina Luisi
- Arturo Lussich

M

- Jorge Machiñena
- Óscar Magurno
- José Carlos Mahía
- Eduardo Malaquina
- Armando Malet
- Luis Eduardo Mallo
- Pedro Manini Ríos
- Carlos Manini Ríos
- Antonio Marchesano
- Julio Marenales
- Pablo de María
- Martin Aguirre Pérez
- Rubén Martínez Huelmo
- Álvaro Martínez Spinola
- Andrés Martínez Trueba
- Daniel Martínez
- Martín C. Martínez
- Daniel Hugo Martins
- Andrés Masoller
- José Luis Massera
- Álvaro Maynard
- César Mayo Gutiérrez
- Carlos Mazzullo
- Benito Medero
- Rosario Medero
- Carminillo Mederos
- Luis Melián Lafinur
- Eudoro Melo
- Aparicio Méndez
- Constante Mendiondo
- Antonio Mercader
- Felipe Michelini
- Rafael Michelini
- Zelmar Michelini
- Pablo Mieres
- Pablo Millor
- Eduardo Minutti
- Néstor Minutti
- Jaime Montaner
- Martha Montaner
- José Benito Monterroso
- Carlos Moreira
- Constanza Moreira
- Luis Mosca
- Jorge Mota
- Basilio Muñoz
- Francisco Joaquín Muñoz
- María Julia Muñoz
- Graciela Muslera

N

- Atilio Narancio
- Benito Nardone
- Alfredo Navarro
- Rodolfo Nin Novoa
- Edgardo Novick

O

- Lucas Obes
- Daniel Olesker
- Fernando Oliú
- Ana Olivera
- Didier Opertti
- Manuel Oribe
- Dardo Ortiz
- Edgardo Ortuño
- Marne Osorio

P

- Jorge Pacheco Areco
- Jorge Pacheco Klein
- Álvaro Pacheco Seré
- Melchor Pacheco y Obes
- Ricardo Pascale
- Ope Pasquet
- Ivonne Passada
- Daniela Payssé
- Eduardo Paz Aguirre
- Jorge Peirano Facio
- Carlos María Penadés
- Gustavo Penadés
- Wilfredo Penco
- Adriana Peña
- Daniel Peña Fernández
- Margarita Percovich
- Alberto Perdomo
- Setembrino Pereda
- Ulysses Pereira Reverbel
- Gabriel Antonio Pereira
- Carlos Julio Pereyra
- José Manuel Pérez Castellano
- Darío Pérez
- Jaime Pérez
- Luis Eduardo Pérez
- Enrique Pintado
- Isabel Pinto de Vidal
- Walter Pintos Risso
- Julio Pintos
- Carlos Pirán
- Carlos Pita
- Humberto Pittamiglio
- Juan E. Pivel Devoto
- Ana Lía Piñeyrúa
- Ricardo Planchón Geymonat
- Ricardo Planchón Malán
- Saviniano 'Nano' Pérez
- Eduardo Pons Echeverry
- Iván Posada
- Gervasio de Posadas Belgrano
- Ignacio de Posadas
- Juan Martín Posadas
- Julia Pou
- Luis Bernardo Pozzolo
- Ricardo Prato
- Sergio Previtali
- Alfredo Puig Spangenberg
- Carlos V. Puig
- Adauto Puñales
- Yeanneth Puñales

Q

- Carlos Quijano

R

- Oscar Víctor Rachetti
- Juan Carlos Raffo Frávega
- Juan Carlos Raffo Costemalle
- Carlos María Ramírez
- Gonzalo Ramírez
- José Pedro Ramírez
- Juan Andrés Ramírez
- Álvaro Ramos Trigo
- Ángel Rath
- Walter Ravenna
- Dardo Regules
- Elías Regules
- Ricardo Reilly Salaverry
- Alfonso Requiterena
- Adela Reta
- Hamlet Reyes
- Ariel Riani
- Irineu Riet Correa
- Héctor Lorenzo Ríos
- Silvio Ríos
- Fructuoso Rivera
- Alba Roballo
- José Enrique Rodó
- Francisco Rodríguez Camusso
- Manuel Rodríguez Correa
- Carlos Rodríguez Labruna
- Eduardo Rodríguez Larreta
- Matilde Rodríguez Larreta
- José Luis Rodríguez Reys
- Edgardo Rodríguez
- Raúl Rodríguez da Silva
- Renán Rodríguez
- Rubén Rodríguez López
- Glenda Rondán
- José Rondeau
- Luis Rosadilla
- Mauricio Rosencof
- Rómulo Rossi
- Mario Rossi Garretano
- Víctor Rossi
- Carlos Roxlo
- Antonio Rubio Pérez
- Eduardo Rubio
- Enrique Rubio (Uruguay)

S

- Sebatián Sabini
- Dardo Sánchez Cal
- Florencio Sánchez
- Jorge Sanguinetti
- Julio María Sanguinetti
- Bertha Sanseverino
- Walter Santoro
- Jorge Sapelli
- Max Sapolinsky
- Miguel Saralegui
- Aparicio Saravia
- Basilicio Saravia
- Diana Saravia Olmos
- Jorge Saravia
- Villanueva Saravia
- Helios Sarthou
- Alberto Scavarelli
- Oscar Secco Ellauri
- Joaquín Secco Illa
- Glauco Segovia
- Víctor Semproni
- Raúl Fernando Sendic
- Raúl Sendic
- Líber Seregni
- José Serrato
- Carlos Signorelli
- Jorge Silveira Zabala
- Julio Silveira
- Melitón Simois
- María Simón
- Juan Adolfo Singer
- Federico Slinger
- Alfredo Solari
- Mariano Soler
- Julio María Sosa
- Benito Stern
- Guillermo Stirling
- Nicolás Storace Arrosa
- Juan Luis Storace
- Nicolás Storace Montes
- Héctor Martín Sturla
- Víctor Sudriers

T

- Héctor Tajam
- Enrique Tarigo
- Duvimioso Terra
- Gabriel Terra
- Horacio Terra Arocena
- Juan Pablo Terra
- Oscar Terzaghi
- Miguel Toma
- Lucía Topolansky
- Daisy Tourné
- Uruguay Tourné
- Mónica Travieso
- Vivian Trías
- Jaime Trobo
- Luis Tróccoli

U

- Francisco Mario Ubillos
- Raúl Ugarte
- Daoiz Uriarte

V

- Víctor Vaillant
- Carlos Varela (Uruguay)
- Carlos Varela Rodríguez
- Jacobo Adrián Varela
- José Pedro Varela
- Pedro Varela
- Amílcar Vasconcellos
- Alfredo Vásquez Acevedo
- Alembert Vaz
- Pedro Vaz
- Jorge Vázquez Rosas
- Santiago Vázquez
- Tabaré Vázquez
- Carlos Végh Garzón
- Alejandro Végh Villegas
- Walter Verri
- Javier de Viana
- Carmelo Vidalín
- Federico Vidiella
- Feliciano Viera
- Leonel Viera
- Tabaré Viera
- Ana María Vignoli
- Carlos Jerónimo Villademoros
- Hugo Villar
- José Villar
- José Villar Gómez
- Alberto Volonté

W

- Claudio Williman
- José Claudio Wílliman

X

- Mónica Xavier

Z

- Pedro Zabalza Arrospide
- Jorge Zabalza
- Justino Zavala Muniz
- Ricardo Zerbino
- Walter Zimmer
- Alejandro Zorrilla de San Martín
- Juan Zorrilla de San Martín
- Alberto Fermín Zubiría
- Jaime de Zudáñez
- Alberto Zumarán
