= Martha Montaner =

Uruguayan politician (1955–2016)

Senator of Uruguay
- In office 15 February 2015 – 9 March 2016
- Succeeded by: Daniel Bianchi

Secretary General of the Colorado Party
- In office 8 March 2012 – 13 May 2013
- Preceded by: Ope Pasquet
- Succeeded by: Max Sapolinsky

Deputy of the Republic
- In office 15 February 2010 – 14 February 2015
- Constituency: Tacuarembó Department

Deputy of the Republic
- In office 15 February 1995 – 14 February 2005
- Constituency: Tacuarembó Department

Personal details
- Born: Martha Silvana Montaner Formoso; 6 January 1955 Tacuarembó, Uruguay
- Died: 9 March 2016 (aged 61) Montevideo, Uruguay
- Cause of death: Cancer
- Party: Colorado Party
- Parents: Jaime Montaner (father); Dora Formoso (mother)
- Education: University of the Republic
- Occupation: Politician, dentist

Martha Silvana Montaner Formoso (6 January 1955 – 9 March 2016) was a Uruguayan politician of the Colorado Party.

== Biography ==
Martha Montaner was the daughter of Dora Formoso and the Pachequista politician Jaime Montaner. First he and then she led the group of list 2215 in Tacuarembó Department. Martha studied dentistry and specialized in pediatric dentistry.

She was elected deputy for the Foro Batllista in Tacuarembó Department in 1994 and 1999.

She joined the so-called "women's caucus", seeking the promotion of political participation and the rights of women, along with fellow deputies Beatriz Argimón, Raquel Barreiro, Nora Castro, Silvana Charlone, Margarita Percovich, Yeanneth Puñales, María Alejandra Rivero Saralegui, Glenda Rondán, Diana Saravia Olmos, Lucía Topolansky, and Daisy Tourné.

On several occasions she was a candidate for the Departmental Intendance of Tacuarembó.

In 2008 Montaner disassociated herself from the Foro Batllista, due to a disagreement over the way it chose candidates. In 2009 she joined the movement Vamos Uruguay, led by Pedro Bordaberry. She was elected deputy for the period 2010-2015. During that term, she was also a substitute for Ope Pasquet in the Senate.

She held a place on the National Executive Committee (CEN) of the Colorado Party. On 8 March 2012, she became the party's Secretary General. This made her the first woman in Uruguayan history to occupy the top position of representation in a political party.

In the 2014 elections she won a seat in the Senate of the Republic, a position she held from 15 February 2015 until her death.

Martha Montaner died on 9 March 2016 at the age of 61, from cancer.

Preceded by Ope Pasquet	Secretary General of the Colorado Party; 2012–2013	Succeeded by Max Sapolinsky
