= Uriarte =

Origin
- Language: Basque
- Region of origin: Basque Country, Spain

Uriarte is a Basque language surname. Notable people with the surname include:

- Ana Lya Uriarte (born 1962), Chilean politician and academic
- Brian Uriarte (born 2008), Spanish motorcycle racer
- Carlos Uriarte (born 1979), American lawyer
- Daoiz Uriarte (born 1956), Uruguayan lawyer, professor, and politician
- Diego Uriarte (born 2001), Spanish cyclist
- Edurne Uriarte (born 1960), Spanish politician and political scientist
- Fermín Uriarte (1902–1972), Uruguayan footballer
- Fidel Uriarte (1945–2016), Spanish footballer and manager
- Filemon Uriarte Jr. (born 1945), Filipino chemical engineer
- Gonzalo Uriarte
- Higinio Uriarte (1843–1909), Paraguayan politician
- Ignacio Uriarte (born 1980), Spanish politician
- Itxaso Uriarte (born 1991), Spanish footballer
- Jon Uriarte (born 1961), Argentine volleyball player and coach
- José Luis Uriarte (born 1977), Chilean politician
- José María de Torrijos y Uriarte (1791–1831), Spanish general
- José Ramón Uriarte (born 1967), Spanish cyclist
- Juan Uriarte (1933–2024), Spanish Roman Catholic prelate
- Luis María Uriarte Alzaa (1924–1979), Spanish politician
- Maria Uriarte, American ecologist
- María de Uriarte (born 1992), Argentine handball player
- Modesta Sanginés Uriarte (1832–1887), Bolivian composer
- Naroa Uriarte (born 2001), Spanish footballer
- Nicolás Uriarte (born 1990), Argentine volleyball player
- Osmany Uriarte (born 1995), Cuban volleyball player
- Pedro Francisco de Uriarte (1758–1839), Argentine statesman and priest
- Sugoi Uriarte (born 1984), Spanish judoka

== See also ==
- Uriarte Talavera
