= Silveira =

Silveira is a Portuguese language surname. Notable people with the surname include:

- Abraham Patusca da Silveira (1905–1990), Brazilian football striker
- Alcides Silveira (1938–2011), Uruguayan international football player and coach of the Uruguay national football team
- Amarildo Tavares da Silveira (1901–?), Brazilian football striker
- Caue Fernandes Silveira (born 1988), Brazilian footballer
- Chu Ming Silveira (1941–1997), Chinese-Brazilian architect and designer
- Fabio Trinidade da Silveira (born 1977), Brazilian footballer commonly known as Fabinho
- Francisco Silveira, Count of Amarante (1763–1821), Portuguese army lieutenant general who fought in the Napoleonic Wars
- Gonçalo da Silveira (1526–1561), Portuguese Jesuit missionary in southern Africa
- Hugo Silveira, Uruguayan footballer who plays for Tigre
- Jorge Beltrão Negromonte da Silveira (born 1961), Brazilian serial killer and cannibal
- Juan Silveira dos Santos (born 1979), Brazilian footballer commonly known as Juan
- Juliana Silveira (born 1980), Brazilian actress and singer
- Julio Silveira (born 1953), Uruguayan politician
- Larry Silveira (born 1965), American golfer
- Leandro Hercílio Carvalho da Silveira (born 1983), Brazilian footballer
- Leonor Silveira (born 1970), Portuguese actress
- Lucas Silveira (born 1974), Canadian vocalist/guitarist and songwriter for the rock band The Cliks
- Lucas Silveira (Brazilian singer) (born 1983), lead vocalist, guitarist and songwriter for the Brazilian emocore band Fresno
- Luis Miguel Silveira, Portuguese engineer
- Maria do Carmo Silveira (born 1961), former Prime Minister of São Tomé and Príncipe
- Martim Mércio da Silveira (1911–1972), Brazilian footballer
- Nacimento Silveira (born 1981), Indian footballer
- Nathercia da Cunha Silveira (1905–1993), Brazilian suffragist
- Onésimo Silveira (1935–2021), Cape Verdean politician and writer
- Regina Silveira (born 1939), Brazilian artist
- Renata Silveira (born 1989), Brazilian sports commentator and journalist
- Sebastião da Silveira Cintra (1882–1942), Brazilian Roman Catholic cardinal
