= Williman =

Williman is a surname. Notable people with the surname include:

- Claudio Wílliman (1861–1934), Uruguayan politician
- José Claudio Wílliman (1925–2006), Uruguayan lawyer and politician
