= List of Uruguayan journalists =

The following is a list of notable journalists from the South American country of Uruguay.

== A–E ==
- Hugo Alfaro
- Homero Alsina Thevenet
- Danilo Arbilla
- Lucho Avilés
- César Batlle Pacheco
- Rafael Batlle Pacheco
- Jorge Batlle Ibáñez
- José Batlle y Ordóñez
- Luis Batlle Berres
- Salvador Bécquer Puig
- Washington Beltrán Mullin
- Virginia Bolten
- Natalio Félix Botana
- Emiliano Cotelo
- Isidoro de María
- Ramón Díaz
- César di Candia
- Carlos María Domínguez

== F–L ==
- Pedro Figari
- Manuel Flores Mora
- Eduardo Galeano
- Jorge Gestoso
- Julio César Grauert
- Ernesto Herrera
- Luis Alberto de Herrera
- Luis Alberto Lacalle

== M–Q ==
- Carlos Maggi
- Walter Martínez
- Luis Melián Lafinur
- Eudoro Melo
- Alejandro Michelena
- Zelmar Michelini
- Víctor Hugo Morales
- Benito Nardone
- María Inés Obaldía
- Jorge Pacheco Areco
- Isabel Pisano
- Carlos Quijano

== R–Z ==
- Carlos María Ramírez
- Eduardo Rodríguez Larreta
- Blanca Rodríguez
- Renán Rodríguez
- Rómulo Rossi
- Antonio Rubio Pérez
- Florencio Sánchez
- Julio María Sanguinetti
- Margherita Sarfatti
- Olhinto María Simoes
- Enrique Tarigo
- Jorge Traverso
- José Pedro Varela
- Raúl Zibechi
- Alfredo Zitarrosa

== See also ==
- List of journalists
- List of Uruguayan writers
