= Olimar =

Olimar may refer to:

- Captain Olimar, main protagonist of the Pikmin video game series
- Olimar (legendary king), king of the East according to Gesta Danorum
- Olimar Kallas (1929–2006), Estonian caricaturist and comic artist; brother of writer Teet Kallas
- Olimar Grande River, river in Uruguay
- Olimar Chico River, river in Uruguay
- Santa Clara de Olimar, town in Uruguay, founded as Olimar in 1878

== See also ==
- Olimarao, an atoll in Micronesia
