= Nora Castro =

Uruguayan politician (born 1947)

- Born: Nora María Castro Navajas; 17 February 1947 (age 79); Montevideo, Uruguay
- Occupations: Educator, politician
- Years active: 1967–present

Nora Castro (born 17 February 1947) is a teacher, professor and Uruguayan politician. She is a member of the Broad Front. She was deputy for the department of Montevideo and the first woman to hold the office of President of the Chamber of Deputies of Uruguay during the first term of 2005. She serves on the Board as Director Central (CODICEN) of the National Public Education Administration (ANEP) of Uruguay.

== Biography ==
Nora María Castro Navajas was born in Montevideo on 17 February 1947 to Carlos Felipe Castro, a sailor in the Uruguayan Navy who actively participated in the Uruguayan dictatorship and Muñeca Navajas, a housewife and a liberal. Her parents divorced when she was a teenager. Castro attended primary school at PS Republic of Ecuador and attended public high schools N° 2 "Hector Miranda Lyceum" and N° 1 "Jose Enrique Rodo". She studied at the teacher's colleges "Maria Stagnero of Munar" and "R. Joaquin Sanchez" earning a degree for teaching primary school. She also took courses in the Science of Education at the Instituto de Profesores Artigas (IPA), before completing her bachelor's degree in education from the University of the Republic.

== Politics ==
Her mother influenced her political views, taking her to her first demonstrations when she was young. She joined the Guild of Students of the high school, then became active in her neighborhood in leftist organizations. During her university studies, Castro joined several militant campus organizations and at political rallies met Raúl Sendic, who became one of the leaders of the Tupamaros guerrillas. In 1971, she participated in the March 26 Movement and founding of the Broad Front (Frente Amplio). After the 1973 Uruguayan coup d'état, Castro was forced to live in hiding and conceal her identity, but she did not stop her activism. She continued to participate in the activities of leftist trade unions and with the mothers of the disappeared.

When the dictatorship ended in the 1980s, she worked with labor unionists like Freddy Ardusso and Jorge Balmelli in the reorganization of the country through the Inter-Union Assembly of Workers (Spanish: Plenario Intersindical de Trabajadores) (PIT), the National Coalition Program (Spanish: Concertación Nacional Programática) and the teacher's unions. She served on the executive board of the Montevideo teachers union and was elected as general secretary. She also served on the National Board of the Uruguayan Federation of Teachers (FUM-TEP).

== Career ==
Castro began working as a teacher in 1967, becoming Master Director in schools on the periphery of Montevideo. She also taught teacher training at the Normal Institutes of Montevideo and the IPA, retiring from the National Administration of Public Education (ANEP) in 1998. From 1997 to 1999 she worked with then-deputy José Mujica campaigning and until the end of 1999 she sold books, fabrics, crafts, and other items to supplement her income. In October 1999 she was elected to the Chamber of Deputies for the period 2000–2005 by the Movement of Popular Participation of the Frente Amplio. In October 2004 she was reelected to the same office, for the 2005–2010 term. By internal vote in February 2005, she was designated as President of the House of Representatives, the first woman to attain this post.

She served on the Commission of Education and Culture of the chamber beginning in 2000 and then in 2007, as a member of the Committee on Public Health and Social Assistance. In addition, she worked on the Special Committee on Gender and Equity for Health Education and was a participant in the Bicameral Women's Caucus. She was one of the founders in 2000 of the Caucus which promotes political participation by women and women's rights. Several other deputies, including Margarita Percovich, Diana Saravia Elms, Lucía Topolansky, and Daisy Tourné were instrumental in developing the organization.

In 2007 she became the Secretary of Institutional Relations for the Board of the Latin American Parliament. Since that time, she has represented Uruguay in the EUROLAT, serving as co-chair of the Committee on Social Affairs. In 2009, she was appointed President of the Institute for Children and Adolescents (INAU), but resigned the position in 2010, to accept an appointment to the Central Board of the National Public Education Administration.
