= Rijo =

Rijo or Rijō may refer to:

== People ==
- Audris Rijo (b. 1985), a Dominican professional model and actress
- José Rijo (b. 1965), a Dominican former baseball player
- Luis Rijo (1927–2001), a Uruguayan footballer
- Wanda Rijo (b. 1979), a Dominican former weightlifter
- Washington García Rijo (1921–2010), a Uruguayan political figure

== Other uses ==
- Hiroshima Castle (広島城, Hiroshima-jō), sometimes called Carp Castle (鯉城, Rijō)
- Rijo Shukyu-Dan (鯉城蹴球団, Rijō Shūkyū Dan), a Japanese amateur football club
- Rio (disambiguation)
- Ríos (disambiguation)
