= Riani =

Riani is an Italian surname. Notable people with the surname include:

- Ariel Riani (1926–2019), Uruguayan politician
- Paolo Riani (born 1937), Italian architect
- Sarah Riani (born 1989), French singer
