= Yeanneth Puñales =

Uruguayan notary and politician (born 1961)

Deputy of the Republic
- In office 2000–2005
- Constituency: Rocha Department

Deputy of the Republic
- In office 1995–2000
- Constituency: Rocha Department

Personal details
- Born: Stella Yeanneth Puñales Brun; 3 June 1961 (age 65) Lascano, Uruguay
- Party: Colorado Party
- Parents: Adauto Puñales (father); Mireya Brum (mother)
- Education: University of the Republic
- Occupation: Notary, politician

Stella Yeanneth Puñales Brun (born 3 June 1961) is a Uruguayan notary and politician, a member of the Colorado Party.

== Biography ==
Yeanneth Puñales was born in Lascano, Rocha Department, the second daughter of politician Adauto Puñales and Mireya Brun.

She graduated as a notary public from the Faculty of Law of the University of the Republic.

From 1990 to 1995 she acted as a substitute deputy for the Unión Colorada y Batllista. In the face of the 1994 elections, together with her father, she joined the Foro Batllista, and was elected titular deputy for her department for the term 1995–2000. She was reelected for the term 2000–2005; during that period she was the fourth Vice President of the Chamber of Representatives.

In her parliamentary performance, her participation in the Gender and Equity Commission (which she presided over) stands out, along with her colleagues Glenda Rondán, Beatriz Argimón, Margarita Percovich, and Daisy Tourné. In 2000, Puñales became pregnant during the legislative term, the first member of the Chamber of Representatives ever to do so. She was obligated to request a month of sick leave, as the body had no provisions in place for maternity or paternity leave. The Gender and Equity Commission subsequently presented an initiative to amend the relevant statute for public officials.

In the 2009 internal elections, she supported the candidacy of Pedro Bordaberry.

Puñales occupies a seat on the National Executive Committee (CEN) of the Colorado Party, and a position of political trust in the Senate.
