= Juan Martínez de Ripalda =

Spanish Jesuit theologian

The Reverend Juan Martínez de Ripalda
- Born: 1594; Pamplona, Spanish Empire
- Died: 26 April 1648 (aged 53–54); Madrid, Spanish Empire
- Era: 17th-century philosophy
- Region: Western philosophy; Spanish philosophy
- School: Scholasticism
- Institutions: University of Salamanca; Colegio Imperial de Madrid
- Main interests: Metaphysics, natural philosophy, ethics

Juan Martínez de Ripalda (1594 at Pamplona, Navarre – 26 April 1648 at Madrid) was a Spanish Jesuit theologian.

== Life ==
He entered the Society of Jesus at Pamplona in 1609. In the triennial reports of 1642 he says of himself that he was not physically strong, that he had studied religion, arts, and theology, that he had taught grammar one year, arts four, theology nineteen, and had been professed. According to Southwell, he taught philosophy at Monforte, theology at Salamanca, and was called from there to the Imperial College of Madrid, where, by royal decree, he taught moral theology.

Later he was named censor to the Spanish Inquisition and confessor of Gaspar de Guzmán, Count-Duke of Olivares, the favorite of Philip IV of Spain, whom he followed when he was exiled from Madrid. Southwell describes his character by saying that he was a good religious, noted for his innocence. Mentally he qualifies him as subtle in argument, sound in opinion, keen-edged and clear in expression, and well-versed in Augustine of Hippo and Thomas Aquinas. According to Paul Drews, no Jesuit ever occupied this chair in the University of Salamanca with more honor than he, and Hurter places him, with Lugo, first among the contemporary theologians of Spain, and perhaps of all Europe.

== Works ==
Among the numerous theological opinions which characterize him the following are worth citing:

1. He thinks that the creation of an intrinsically supernatural substance is possible, in other words, that a creature is possible to which supernatural grace, with the accompanying gifts and intuitive vision, is due.
2. He holds that, by a positive decree of God, supernatural grace is conferred, in the existing providence for every good act whatsoever; so that every good act is supernatural, or at least that every natural good act is accompanied by another which is supernatural.
3. He maintains that, prescinding from the extrinsic Divine law, and taking into account only the nature of things, the supernatural faith which is called lata would be sufficient for justification, that faith, namely, which comes by the contemplation of created things, though assent is not produced without grace.
4. He affirms that in the promissory revelations the formal object of faith is God's faithfulness to His promises, the constancy of His will, and the efficacy of omnipotence.
5. He asserts that all the propositions of Baius were condemned for doctrine according to the sense in which he (Baius) held them.
6. He maintains that the Divine maternity of the Blessed Virgin Mary is of itself a sanctifying form.

The following are his works:

- "De ente supernaturali disputationes in universam theologiam", .three vols., I (Bordeaux, 1634), II (Lyons, 1645), III, written "Adversus Bajanos" (Cologne, 1648); rare editions like that of Lyons, 1663, have been published of the two first volumes.

It is a classic work in which he included questions which are not included in ordinary theological treatises. His third volume was attacked in an anonymous work, "P. Joannis Martínez ... Vulpes capta per theologos ... Academiae Lovaniensis", which Reusch says was the work of John Sinnich. "Expositio brevis litterae Magistri Sententiarum" (Salamanca, 1635), praised by the Calvinist Voet.

- "Tractatus theologici et scholastici de virtutibus, fide, spe et charitate" (Lyons, 1652), a posthumous work and very rare. Two new editions of all his works have been issued: Vives (8 vols., Paris, 1871-3), Palmé (4 vols., Paris, Rome, Propaganda Fide, 1870-1).
- "Discurso sobre la elección de sucessor del pontificado en vida del pontifice" (Seville). Uriarte says this work was published in Aragon, perhaps in Huesca, with the anagram of Martín Jirón de Palazeda, written by order of the Count de Olivares.

The following are in manuscript: "De visione Dei" (2 vols.); "De praedestinatione"; "De angelis et auxiliis"; "De voluntate Dei" preserved in the University of Salamanca; "Discurso acerca de la ley de desafío y parecer sobre el desafio de Medina Sidonia a Juan de Braganza", preserved in the Biblioteca Nacional.
