= Azucena Berrutti =

Uruguayan politician and lawyer

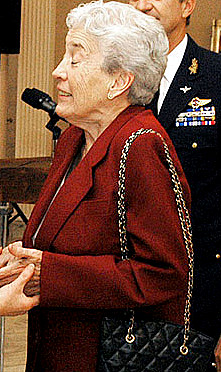

Minister of Defence
- In office 1 March 2005 – 3 March 2008
- President: Tabaré Vázquez
- Preceded by: Yamandú Fau
- Succeeded by: José Bayardi

Personal details
- Born: 1929 (age 96–97) Montevideo, Uruguay
- Party: Broad Front
- Education: University of the Republic

Azucena Berrutti (born 1929) is a Uruguayan politician and lawyer. She was the National Defence Minister, appointed by the Uruguayan President Tabaré Vázquez, from March 2005 until March 2008.

== Defence Minister 2005–2008 ==
At the age of 75, Berrutti, assumed the position of Minister of Defence in 2005, when Tabaré Vázquez became President of Uruguay. She was the first woman in this position.

In 2008 Berrutti was facing challenges by the Movement of Popular Participation (MPP) deputy Juan Domínguez, ostensibly a colleague in the ruling Frente Amplio coalition, and others in controversies surrounding defence procurement and the Nin brothers (Vice President of Uruguay Rodolfo Nin Novoa and his chief of staff Gonzalo Nin Novoa).

== See also ==
- Politics of Uruguay
