= Daniel Martínez (politician) =

Uruguayan industrial engineer & politician (born 1957)

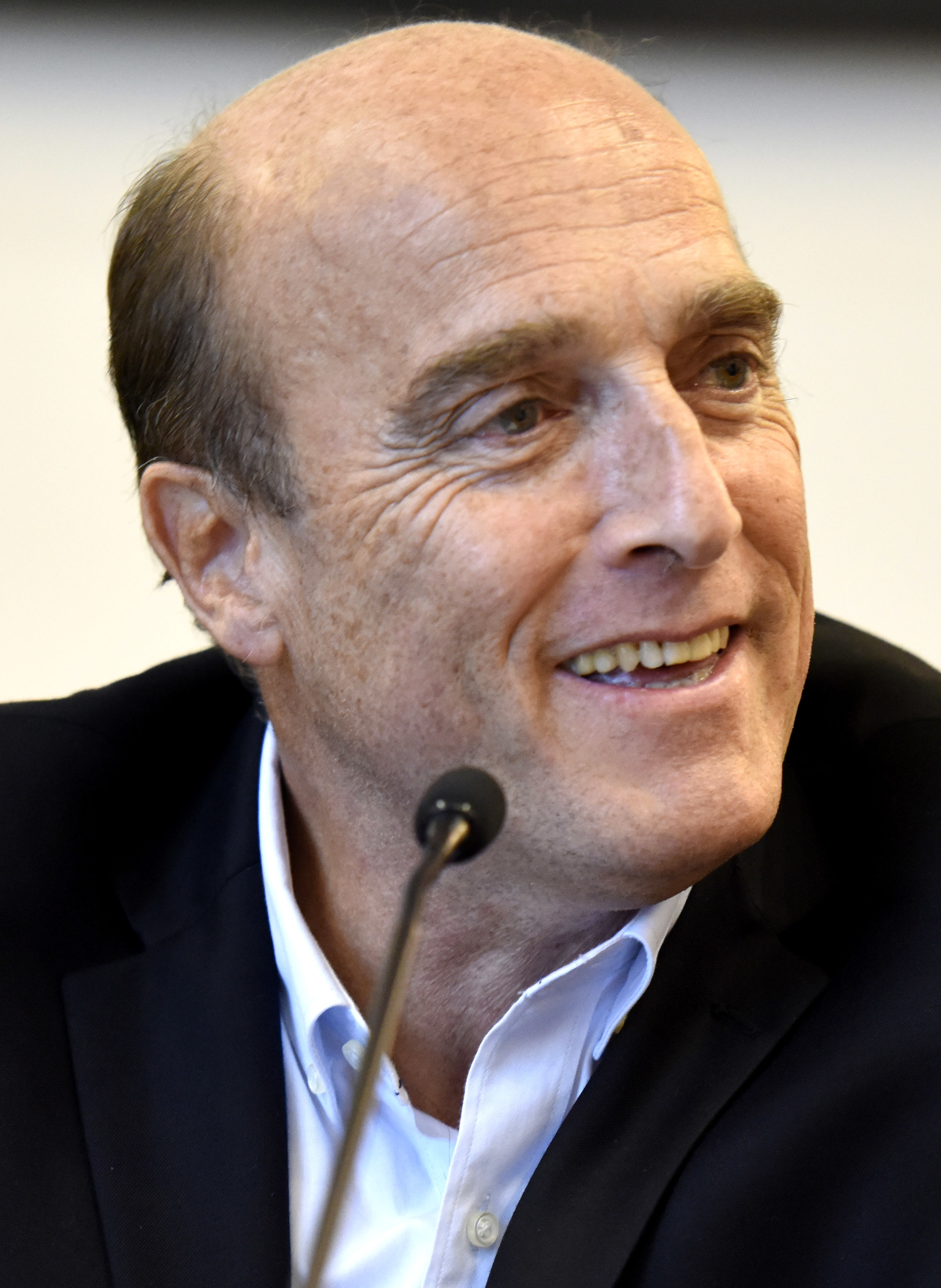
- Martínez in 2014

Intendant of Montevideo
- In office 9 July 2015 – 1 April 2019
- Preceded by: Ana Olivera
- Succeeded by: Christian Di Candia

Senator of Uruguay
- In office 15 February 2010 – 16 June 2015
- Preceded by: Mónica Xavier
- Succeeded by: Daisy Tourné

Minister of Industry, Energy and Mining
- In office 3 March 2008 – 31 August 2009
- President: Tabaré Vázquez
- Preceded by: Jorge Lepra
- Succeeded by: Raúl Sendic

President of ANCAP
- In office 1 March 2005 – 3 March 2008
- Preceded by: Gabriel Gurméndez
- Succeeded by: Raúl Sendic

Personal details
- Born: Daniel Carlos Martínez Villamil; 23 February 1957 (age 69) Montevideo, Uruguay
- Party: Socialist Party
- Other political affiliations: Broad Front
- Spouse: Laura Motta
- Education: Universidad de la República

Daniel Carlos Martínez Villamil (born 23 February 1957) is a Uruguayan politician who served as intendant of Montevideo from 2015 to 2019. He previously served as Senator of the Republic from 2010 to 2015, as minister of Industry, Energy and Mining in the administration of José Mujica from 2008 to 2009 and as president of the state-owned petrol company ANCAP from 2005 to 2008. A member of the Socialist Party – Broad Front, he was a candidate for president in the 2019 general election, being defeated in the second round by Luis Lacalle Pou.

== Early life and career ==
Daniel Martínez was born on 23 February 1957 in Montevideo, into a conservative middle-class family. He was the second and youngest son of Roberto Martínez and María de los Ángeles Villamil. He also holds French nationality, due to the fact that his paternal grandmother was born in France while his great-grandfather served as Uruguayan consul in France in the early years of the 20th century.

Martínez was raised in the Pocitos neighborhood and attended Colegio Seminario. In 1981 he graduated from the University of the Republic with a degree in electrical engineering.

For many years he was Vice President of the Uruguayan Engineers' Association. He was elected Intendant of Montevideo in 2015.

He is a member of the Uruguayan Socialist Party, having been active during the period of civic-military dictatorship of Uruguay (1973–1985).

== Industry Minister ==
From March 3, 2008 until August 31, 2009, he served as Uruguayan Minister of Industry, Energy and Mining in the government of President Tabaré Vázquez. He succeeded Jorge Lepra in that post.

== Intendant of Montevideo ==
In the 2015 elections he was elected as Intendant of Montevideo. In April 2019 he resigned as Intendant of Montevideo to run for the Presidency and was succeeded by Christian Di Candia.

== Presidential candidate ==
Martínez was the presidential candidate of the Broad Front for the 2019 national elections. After a very close runoff election against National Party candidate Luis Lacalle Pou, Martinez was defeated by just over 37,000 votes, and withdrew after absentee ballots were counted. He chose Graciela Villar as his running mate. On November 28, 2019, Martínez conceded defeat.

== Personal life ==
He is married to Laura Motta, an English teacher, with whom he has three daughters and seven grandchildren.

== See also ==
- Politics of Uruguay
