= Tupambaé =

- Village
- Location in Uruguay
- Coordinates: 32°50′0″S 54°46′0″W
- Country: Uruguay
- Department: Cerro Largo Department

Population (2011)
  - Total: 1,122
- Time zone: UTC -3
- Postal code: 37006
- Dial plan: +598 4464 (+4 digits)

Tupambaé is a village (pueblo) in the Cerro Largo Department of eastern Uruguay.

== Geography ==
It is located on the border with Treinta y Tres Department, on Km. 334 of Route 7, about 86 kilometres (53 mi) southwest of Melo. The railroad track Montevideo - Melo pass through the south part of the village. Its closest populated place is Santa Clara de Olimar of Treinta y Tres Department, located 21 kilometres (13 mi) to the southwest along Ruta 7.

== History ==
Its status was elevated to "Pueblo" category on 19 August 1926 by the Act of Ley Nº 7.984.

== Population ==
In 2011, Tupambaé had a population of 1,122.

| Year | Population |
|---|---|
| 1963 | 1,073 |
| 1975 | 1,125 |
| 1985 | 1,035 |
| 1996 | 974 |
| 2004 | 1,169 |
| 2011 | 1,122 |

Source: Instituto Nacional de Estadística de Uruguay

== Notable people ==
- José Enrique Díaz Chávez (1932–2025), politician, Minister of the Interior 2005–2007

== Places of worship ==
- St. Joseph Parish Church (Roman Catholic)
