= Croatia–Uruguay relations =

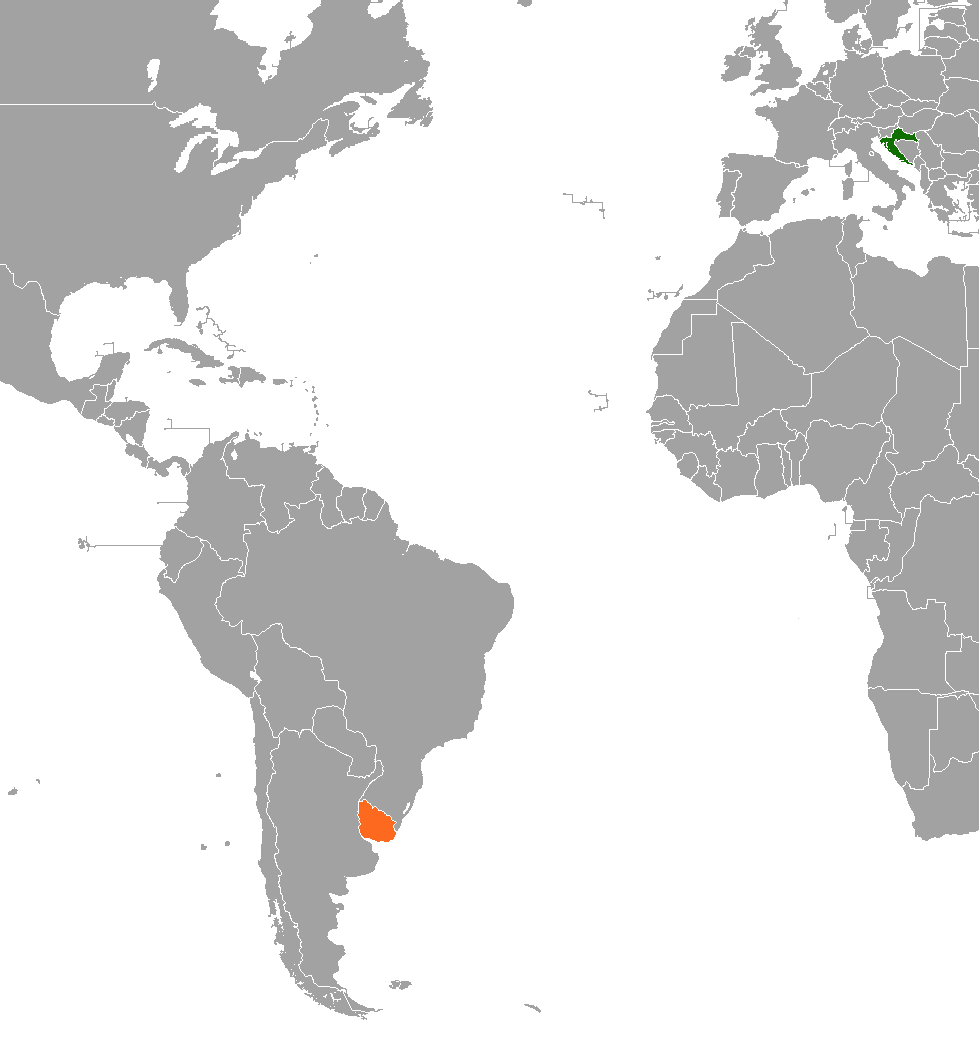

- Croatia: Uruguay

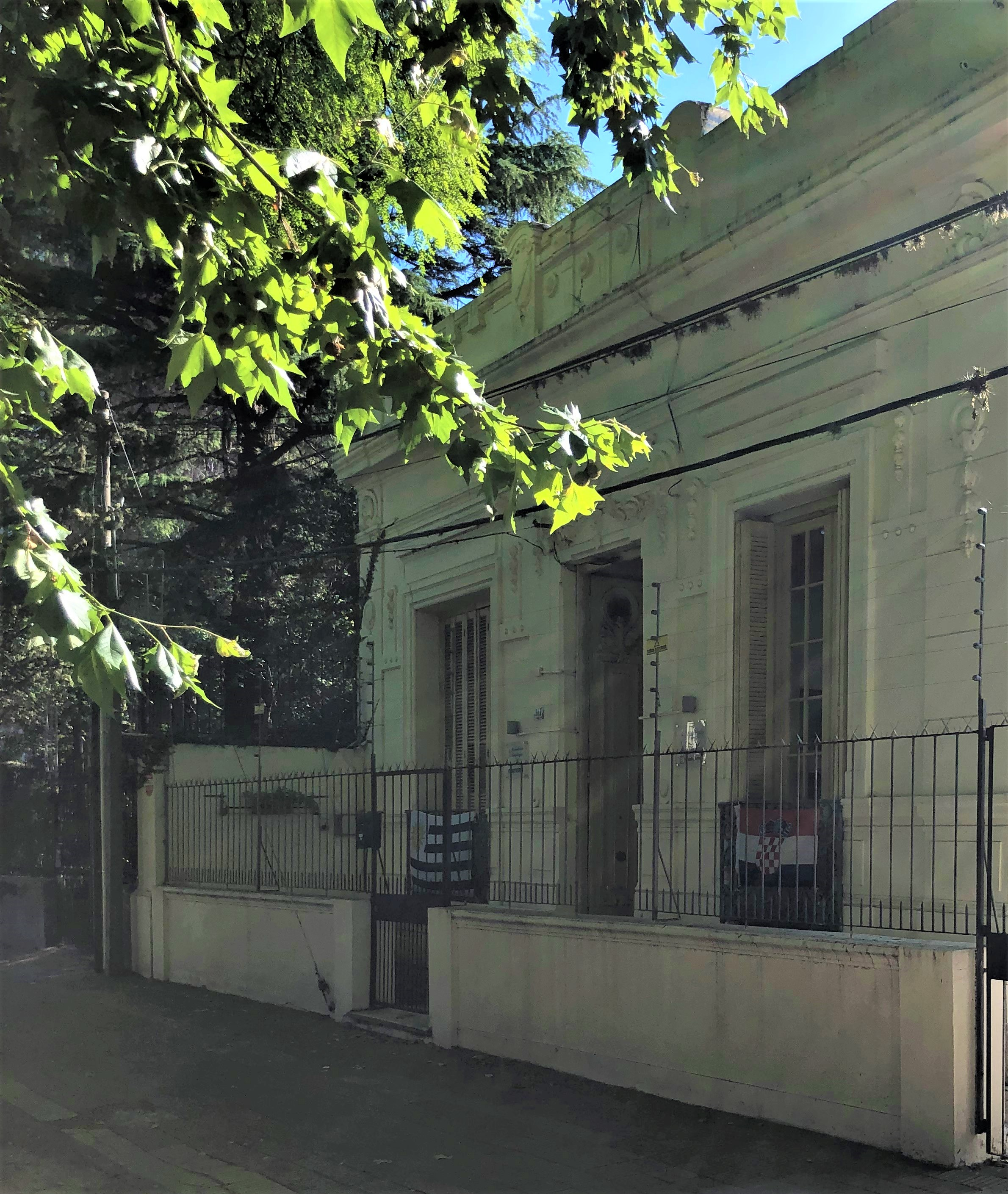
A house in Montevideo with flags of Croatia and Uruguay.

Croatia–Uruguay relations refer to the bilateral relations between Croatia and Uruguay. Both countries established diplomatic relations in 1993. Croatia has an ambassador in Argentina, whose jurisdiction includes Uruguay; and an honorary consulate in Montevideo. Uruguay is represented in Croatia through its ambassador in Vienna.

Both countries are members of the United Nations.

Uruguay recognized the independence of Croatia in 1992; at the same time, it broke its relations with former Yugoslavia. In 2013, a Cooperation Agreement on Culture, Science, and Education was signed between the governments of both countries.

There is a Uruguayan-Croatian Chamber of Commerce and Industry.

A square in Montevideo pays tribute to Zagreb.

== See also ==
- Croatian Uruguayans
- Foreign relations of Croatia
- Foreign relations of Uruguay
