= Lascano =

- City
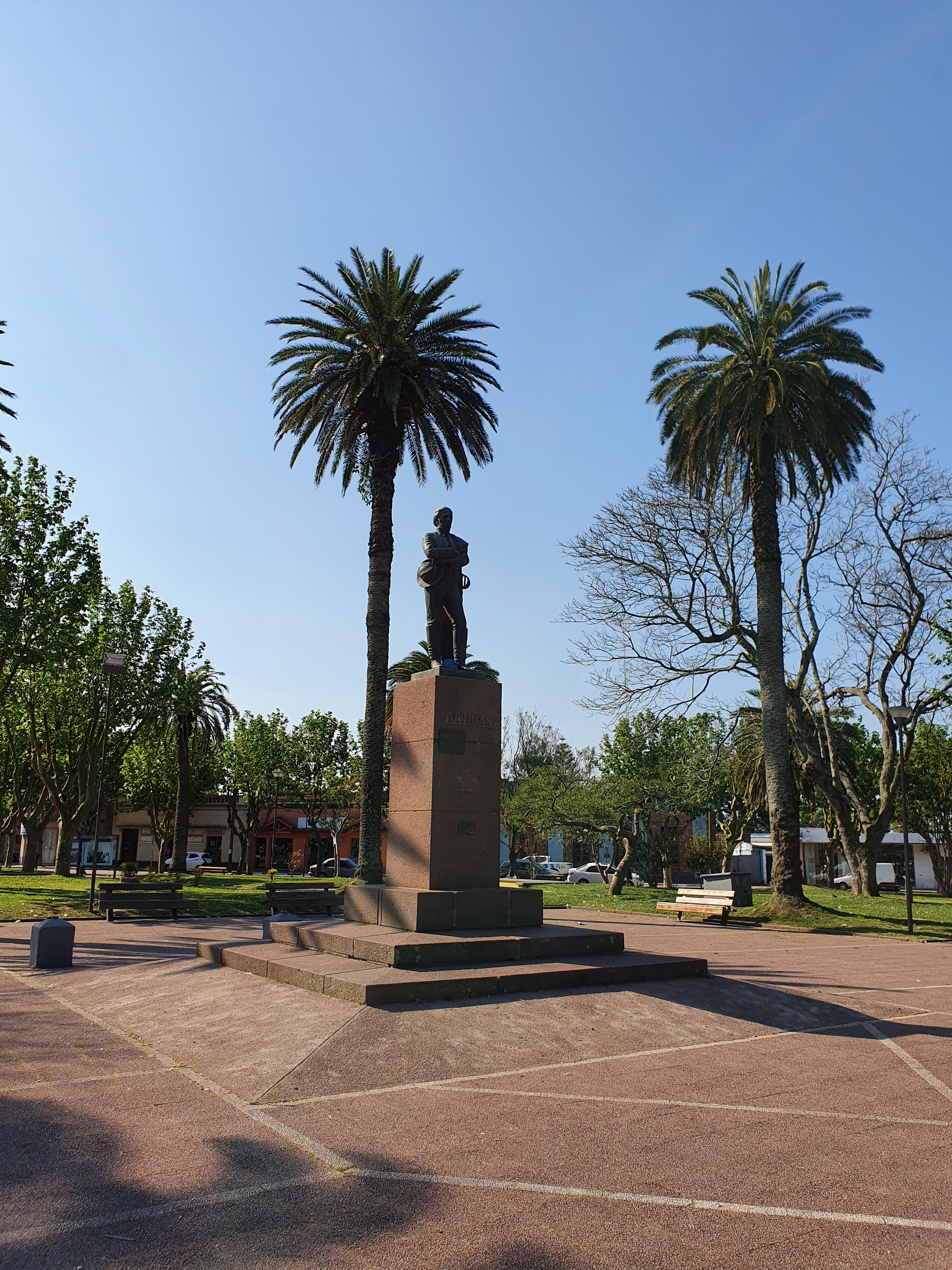
- Artigas monument

- Location in Uruguay
- Coordinates: 33°40′26″S 54°12′27″W
- Country: Uruguay
- Department: Rocha

Population (2011 Census)
  - Total: 7,645
- Time zone: UTC -3
- Postal code: 27300
- Dial plan: +598 4456 (+4 digits)
- Climate: Cfa

Lascano is a small town in the Rocha Department of southeastern Uruguay.

== Geography ==
The town is located at the junction of Route 15 with Route 14, 13 kilometres (8.1 mi) from rio Cebollatí which is the border with Lavalleja Department.

== History ==
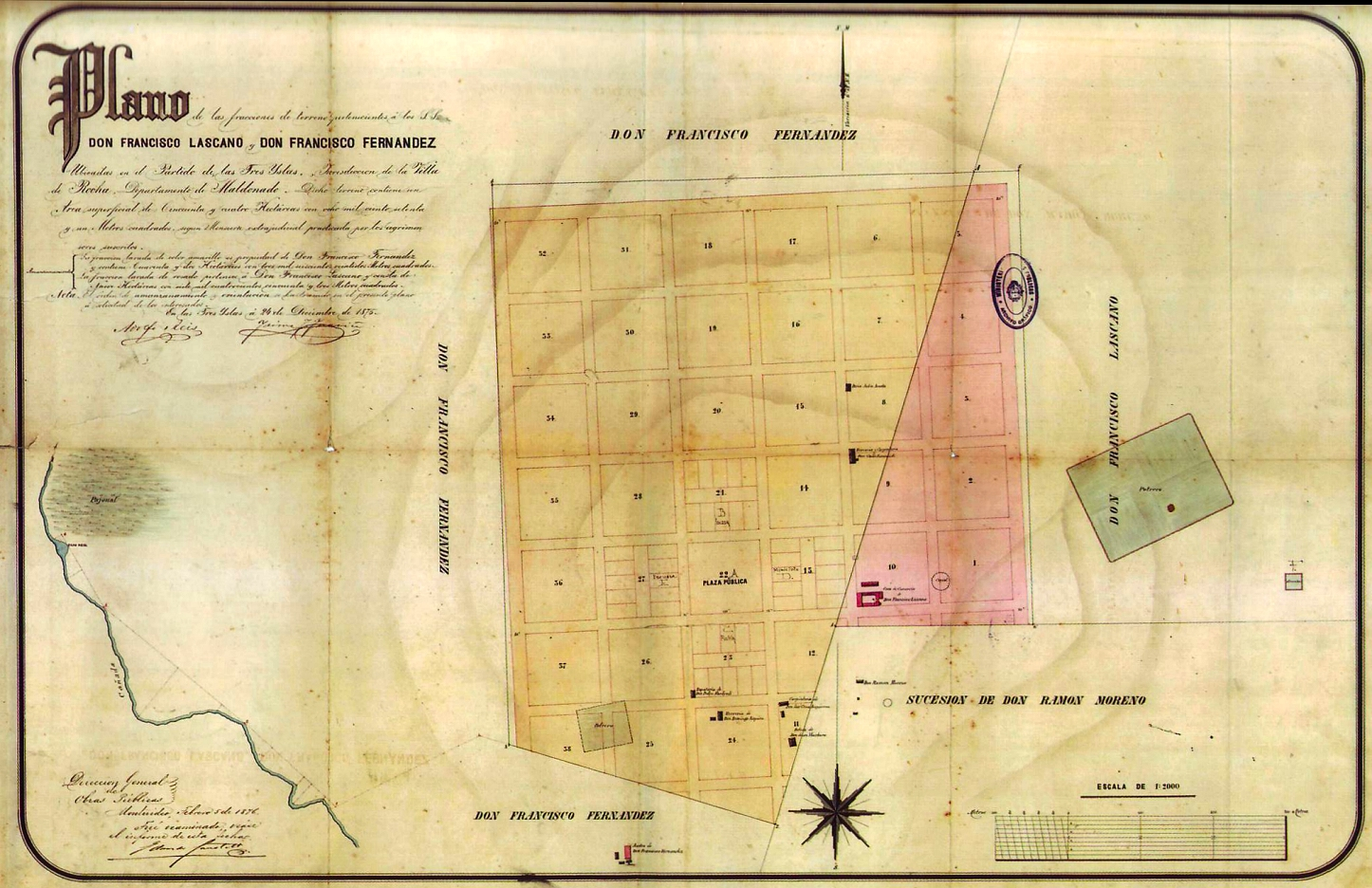
1875 map showing the estates on which Lascano was founded.

A village was first founded in the fields of ranchers Don Francisco Fernández and Don Francisco Lascano, by decree of 10 February 1876. The estates were situated on what was called until then "Partido de las Tres Islas". Although Don Lascano had a much smaller portion of land, the village used the name as it was on the signed official papers. Don Fernández's illiteracy also eliminated his claim to the name. In 1880 it became part of the newly formed Rocha Department.

On 4 July 1908, its status was elevated to "Villa" (town) by the Act of Ley N° 3.304 and on 3 November 1952 to "Ciudad" (city) by the Act of Ley N° 11.874.

== Population ==
In 2011 Lascano had a population of 7,645.

Year	Population
1908	3,866
1963	5,309
1975	6,026
1985	7,152
1996	7,134
2004	6,994
2011	7,645

Source: Instituto Nacional de Estadística de Uruguay

== Notable people ==
- Artigas Barrios, politician
- Carlos Julio Eizmendi, violinist
- Adauto Puñales, politician
- Yeanneth Puñales, writer and politician
- Javier Gerard, famous rabbi
