= Gonzalo Nin Novoa =

Gonzalo Nin Novoa is a Uruguayan administrator, serving as chief of staff to the Vice President of Uruguay, Rodolfo Nin Novoa, serving in that office from 2005 to 2010.

== Role and publicity ==
Although not overtly a political figure, Gonzalo Nin Novoa has attracted wide media exposure regarding a number of issues. These issues include defence procurement and expense claims. Ostensible colleagues in the ruling government coalition, including Juan Domínguez, and others, became involved in hostile, public discussion of various activities of the Nin brothers, exemplifying some of the diversity and strains which existed within that coalition.

== Defence procurement issues ==
Gonzalo Nin Novoa's close identification with defence procurement issues, in a manner with which Leftist deputies in the ruling government coalition had reservations, left the Defence Ministry, led until March 2008 by Minister Azucena Berruti, with dilemmas and challenges. These included those of loyalty to President of Uruguay Tabaré Vázquez while being aware than many on the Uruguayan Left harboured little empathy with business issues relating to defence procurement.

== See also ==
- Politics of Uruguay
- List of political families#Uruguay
- Juan Domínguez (politician)#Re. the Nin brothers and defence procurement
