= Croatian Uruguayans =

Hrvati u Urugvaju (Croatian) Croata-uruguayos (Spanish)
- (Uruguay) (Croatia)
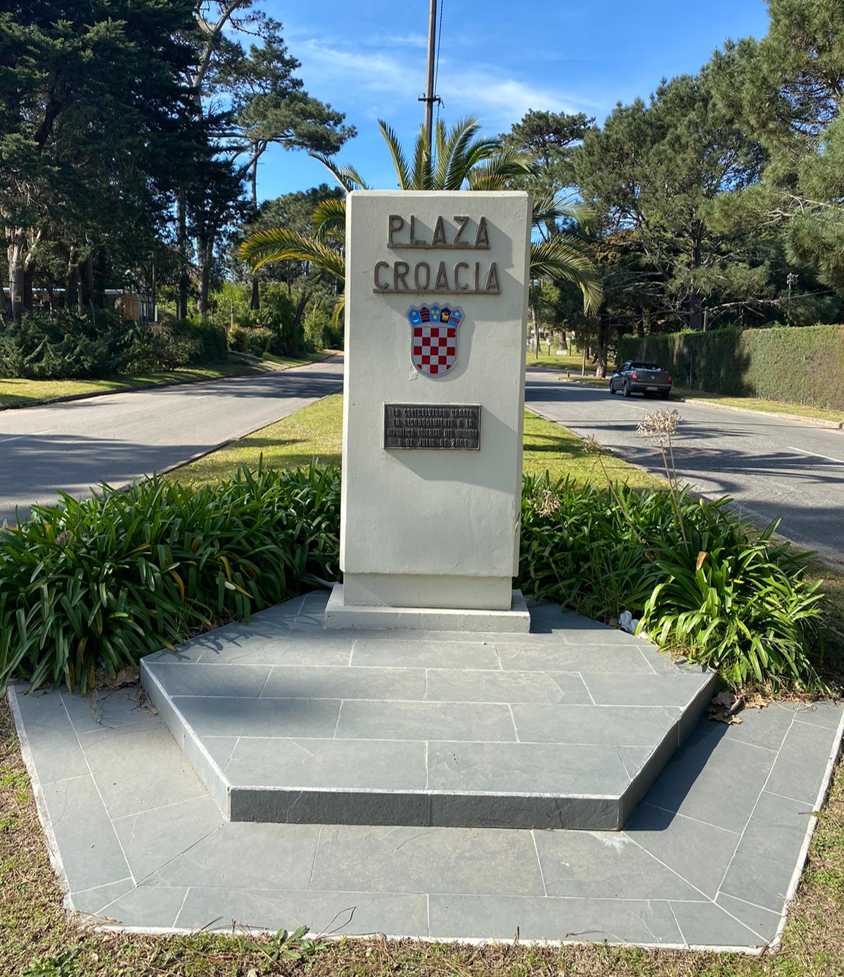
- Croatian monument in Punta del Este

Total population
- 3,300–5,000

Regions with significant populations
- Montevideo · Colonia

Languages
- Rioplatense Spanish · Croatian

Religion
- Christianity (predominantly Catholicism)

Related ethnic groups
- Croats; Croatian Argentines; Croatian Brazilians; Croatian Americans; Croatian Canadians; Croatian Australians

Croatian Uruguayans are Croat migrants to Uruguay and their descendants. The first Croats reached the Río de la Plata region during the second half of the 18th century; the biggest inflow of immigrants was mostly during the first half of the 20th century. They established their own institutions, such as the Croatian Home. According to estimates from the United Nations, there are some 3,300 people of Croat descent living in Uruguay, whereas other estimates place the figure at around 5,000. In 2006, author and politician Eduardo R. Antonich published the monograph Hrvatska i Hrvati u Urugvaju (English: Croatia and Croats in Uruguay), which explores the history of the Croatian community within Uruguay.

== History ==
The earliest records of Croatian settlers in Uruguay date back to the 18th century, referring to sailors who abandoned Venetian and Spanish ships and settled in the Río de la Plata region. The oldest known testimony on this matter is the will of Šimun Matulić from 1790, in which he states that he was born on the island of Brač, during the Republic of Venice, and bequeaths his property in Montevideo to several individuals with Croatian surnames to care for his holdings.

At the end of the 19th century, within the framework of Uruguay's open immigration policy, there was a more significant influx of Croatians to Uruguay, primarily from the Dalmatia region. Most settled in Montevideo, although small communities were established in places like Conchillas and Carmelo in the Colonia Department, where they engaged in maritime transportation.

In 1928, the Hogar Croata de Montevideo (English: Croatian Home of Montevideo) was founded, an association aimed at promoting Croatian culture, language, and traditions, as well as bringing together immigrants and their descendants. However, for much of the 20th century, the Sociedad Yugoslava Bratstvo del Uruguay (English: Yugoslav Brotherhood Society of Uruguay) was composed mainly of ethnic Croats, along with Montenegrins, Serbs, Bosnians, and Slovenes, but ceased operations in the 1990s due to the Yugoslav Wars.

Politically, much of the Croatian community in Uruguay opposed the Independent State of Croatia since the treaties of Rome ceded the Dalmatia region—where most Croatian immigrants in Uruguay originated—to Fascist Italy. Additionally, following the Tito–Stalin split in the years after World War II, members of the Hogar Croata de Montevideo sided with Josip Broz Tito, the Leader of Yugoslavia from 1945 to 1980, while those of the Sociedad Yugoslava Bratstvo del Uruguay supported Joseph Stalin.

== Notable people ==
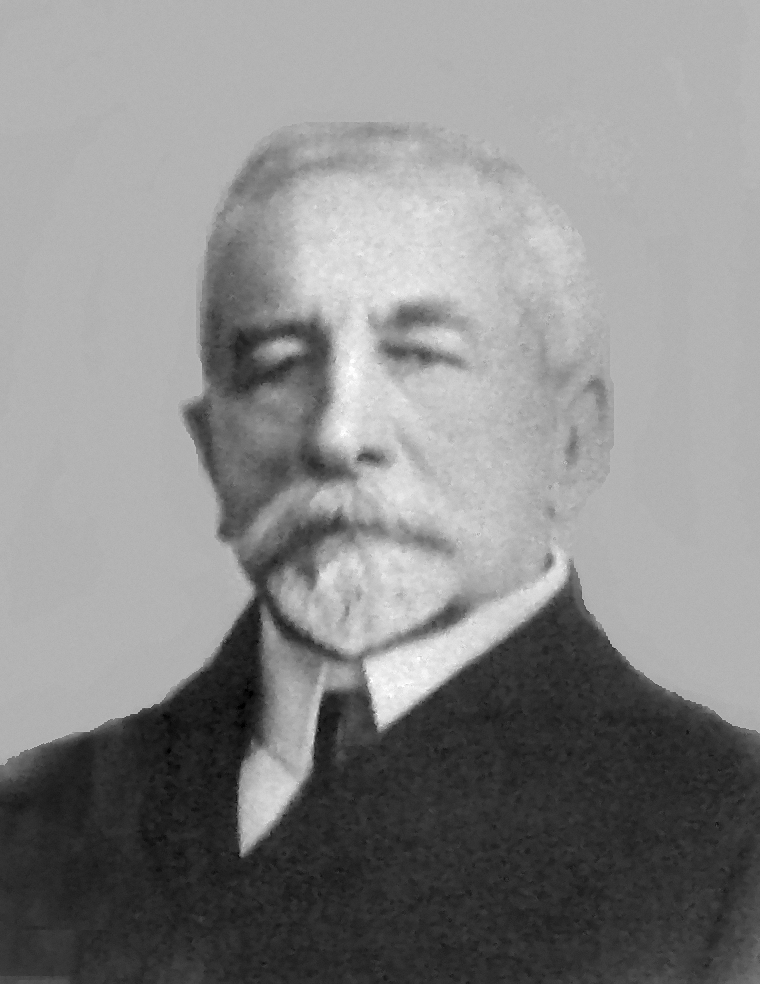
Antonio Lussich

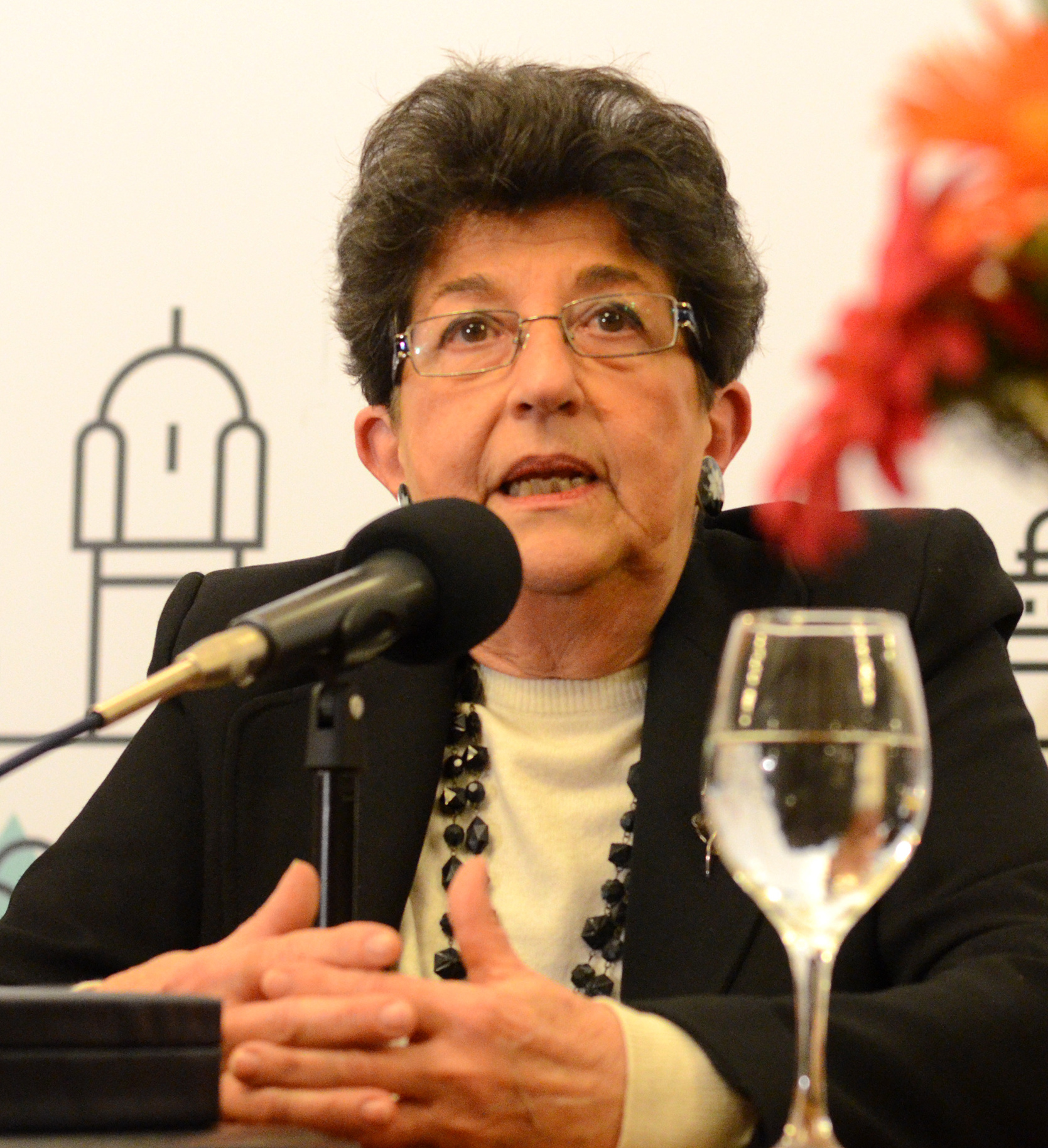
Margarita Percovich

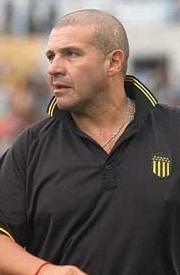
Julio César Ribas

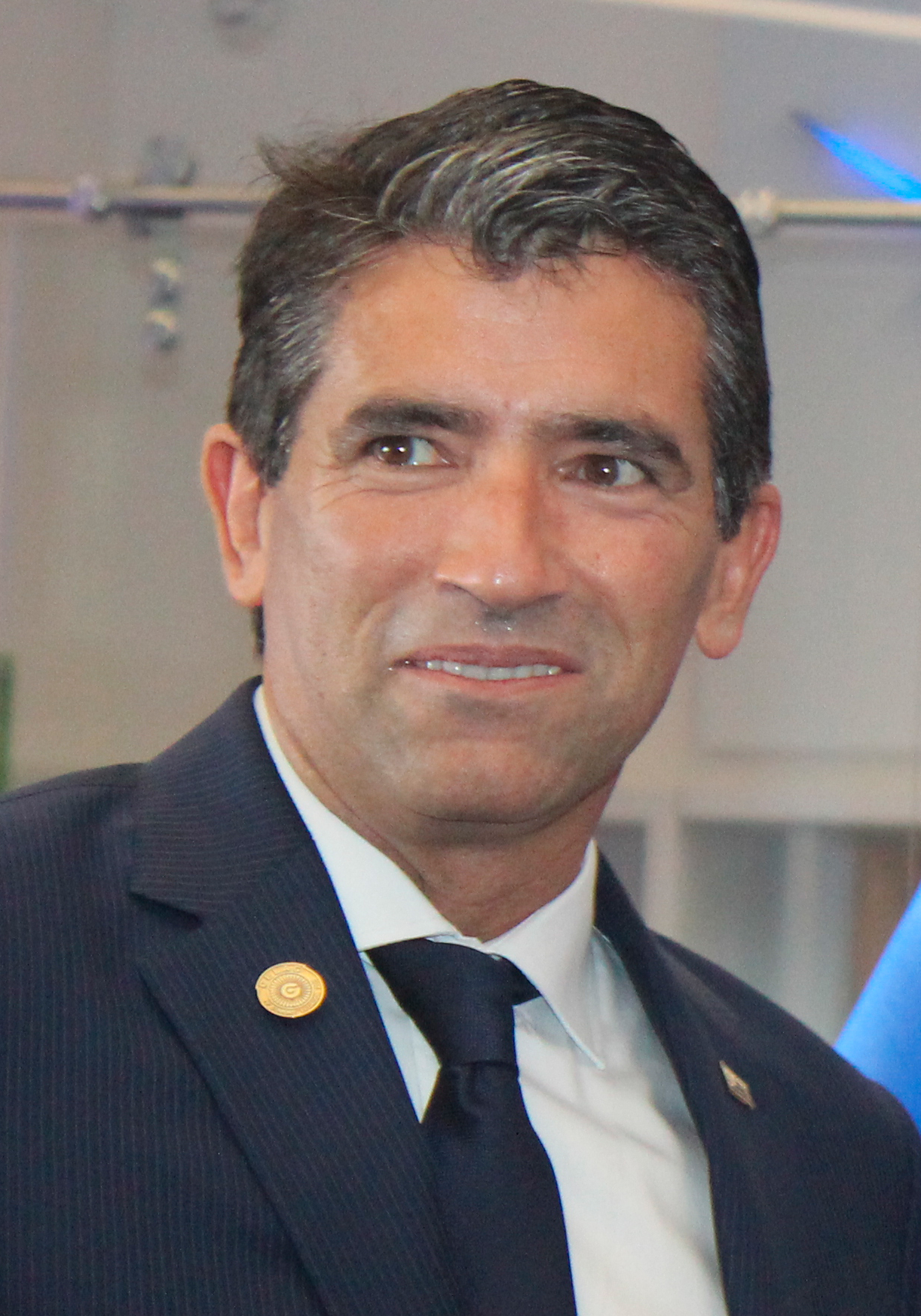
Raúl Fernando Sendic

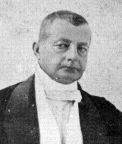
Teodoro Vilardebó Matulić

Past

- Nancy Guguich [es] (1944–2021), vocalist
- Antonio Lussich (1848–1928), sailor, writer and naturalist
- Arturo Lussich (1872–1966), physician and politician
- Raúl Sendic (1926–1989), politician and guerrilla leader
- Teodoro Vilardebó Matulić (1803–1856), physician and naturalist

Present

- Jorge Jukich (born 1943), Olympic cyclist
- Rodrigo Lussich [es] (born 1972), television personality
- Esteban Ostojich (born 1982), football referee
- Margarita Percovich (born 1941), politician and activist
- Mariana Percovich (born 1963), politician and activist
- Julio César Ribas Vlacovich (born 1957), footballer manager
- Raúl Fernando Sendic (born 1962), politician, Vice President of Uruguay between 2015–2017

== See also ==
- Croats
- List of Croats
- Croatia–Uruguay relations
