= Luis María Uriarte Alzaa =

Spanish politician (1924–1979)

Luis María Uriarte Alzaa (1924 in Durango – 1979 in Vedia) was a Spanish politician, Mayor of Vedia (Guipuzcoa) and Provincial Congressman in Biscay. The terrorist organization ETA murdered Luis María on September 29, 1979.

== Biography ==
Luis Uriarte María Alzaa, native of Durango, but resident in Vedia was murdered on September 29, 1979, when he was 55 years old. He was married and had three kids. He had been mayor of Vedia for 11 years and Provincial Deputy for Vizcaya. He was one of the founding members of Alianza Popular in Biscay and vocal in their first Board of Directors. At the time of his murder, he had resumed his work as a manager in a few workshops.

=== Murder ===
On Saturday, September 29, 1979, Luis María Uriarte came out of his home, the Caserío Ibarra of Vedia, heading to his job. It was 8 a.m. when Luis Maria read the newspaper in his vehicle parked in front of the shop before he began the workday. At that moment, two members of ETA left the stairs located metres away and approached the car, a meter and a half of it, they fired two-shot of a gun and, later, a burst of a machine gun. As a result of the shooting, Luis María Uriarte fell wounded in the car. An employee of the workshop and several passers-by came to his aid and requested an ambulance. He was transferred to the Hospital in a very critical condition.

Luis María received nine bullet impacts in different parts of the body: two in the arm, two in the chest, three in the stomach, one in the leg and another one in the testicles. The Guardia Civil would find eleven caps 9 mm calibre bullet parabellum, although it is estimated that the two ETA's members made 20 shots. Luis Maria underwent surgery for more than 5 hours in the Hospital. He died on October 5 at 9 a.m. The autopsy concluded that he died by a traumatic shock as a result of the shots received during the attack.

In addition to the two terrorists who were directly against Luis Maria there was a third person who awaited them in a yellow Renault vehicle. They scaped towards Amorebieta. The car used by ETA was stolen in Galdakao. The individuals who stole the car were not using a mask to cover their faces. They approached the priest who was driving the car around 6:30 a.m. on the same day of the attack. The priest was native of Amorebieta, who worked as a sales promoter of Egin newspaper.

The Court of the first instance and instruction No. 1 of Durango decreed the provisional dismissal of these proceedings on December 20, 1979, due to lack of evidence. As for the authorship, the military branch of ETA claimed it on October 2, 1979.
