= José Díaz (Uruguayan politician) =

Uruguayan politician (1932–2025)

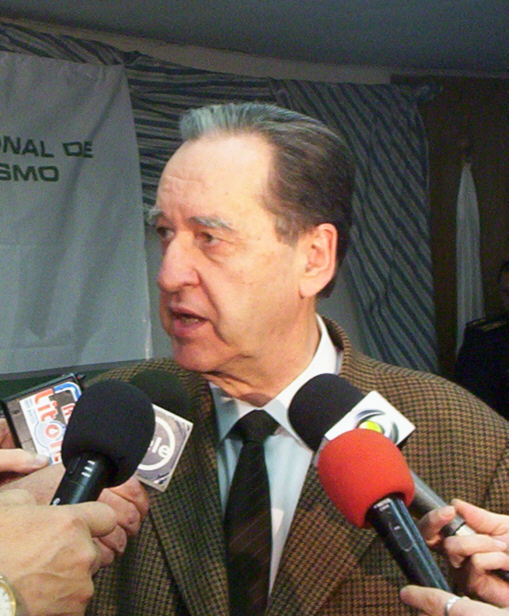
- Díaz in 2006

Minister of the Interior
- In office 1 March 2005 – 8 March 2007
- President: Jorge Batlle
- Preceded by: Alejo Fernández Cháves
- Succeeded by: Daisy Tourné

Personal details
- Born: José Enrique Díaz Chávez; 17 January 1932 Tupambaé, Uruguay
- Died: 4 July 2025 (aged 93) Montevideo, Uruguay
- Party: FA
- Education: University of the Republic
- Occupation: Lawyer

José Enrique Díaz Chávez (Spanish: [xoˈse enˈɾike ˈðias ˈtʃaβes]; 17 January 1932 – 4 July 2025) was a Uruguayan politician who was a member of the Broad Front, he served as Minister of the Interior from 2005 to 2007.

Díaz died in Montevideo on 4 July 2025, at the age of 93.
