= Olimar (legendary king) =

Legendary king mentioned by Saxo Grammaticus

Olimar or Olmar was a legendary king of the Easterlings (Rex Orientalis) whose realms included Garðaríki, Estonia and Courland. Saxo Grammaticus in Book 5 of Gesta Danorum describes him as a contemporary of Frotho III. While not attested in contemporary or archaeological records, Olimar is a composite figure representing Eastern chieftains, possibly based on real tribal leaders from the Baltic region.

== Gesta Danorum ==
According to Saxo Grammaticus, Olimar was a powerful monarch with a vast naval force. He is said to have allied with the King of the Huns in retaliation after Frotho III dismissed the Hunnish king's daughter, Hanunda, from marriage. Together they assembled a massive invasion force aimed at subjugating Denmark. Olimar was placed in command of the fleet, while the Hunnish king led the land army. Their forces gathered near the eastern regions, with Olimar's base of operations described as "not far from Ruthenia." Saxo claims that six kings, including Olimar, each commanded 5,000 ships, though such numbers are clearly legendary in scope.

During a reconnaissance mission, Frotho's trusted counselor Erik encountered Olmar and famously questioned his intentions:

"Vain hope of conquering the unconquered hath filled thy heart; over Frotho no man can prevail."

Olimar, in reply, asserted that Frotho's defeat was inevitable, offering a stoic maxim:

"Whatsoever befalls, must once happen for the first time; and often enough the unexpected comes to pass."

Despite his overwhelming numerical advantage, the forces of Olimar were defeated in a climactic naval and land battle. Saxo attributes the Danish victory to superior discipline, courage, and the strategic counsel of Erik. Most of the allied kings fell in the battle, with Olimar and King Dag said to be the only survivors. After his victory, Frotho gathered a new coalition against the Huns, including Danes, Norwegians, and the forces of the East under the command of Olimar who now pledged allegiance to Frotho. Olimar was assigned by Frotho to lead a supply expedition to Sweden, using this opportunity to lead a major conquest campaign east and north. His conquests significantly expanded Danish-controlled territory.

But Olimar conquered Thor the Long, the King of the Jemts and the Helsings, with two other captains of no less power, and also took Estonia and Courland, with Öland, and the isles that fringe Sweden; thus he was a most renowned conqueror of savage lands. So he brought back 700 ships, thus doubling the numbers of those previously taken out.

— Gesta Danorum, Book V.

Following his successful campaign, Olimar was received by Frotho III not as an enemy but as a victorious commander, having proven his value in battle. Following the decisive victory over the Hunnic alliance, Frotho reorganized the conquered lands into a vast empire, that allegedly stretched from Ruthenia in the east to the Rhine in the west. He appointed Olimar as governor of Holmgård, while Dag became the governor of Estonia. Each governor was obligated to pay tribute, as Frotho established a unified legal framework across the realm.
