= Itxaso Uriarte =

Spanish footballer (born 1991)

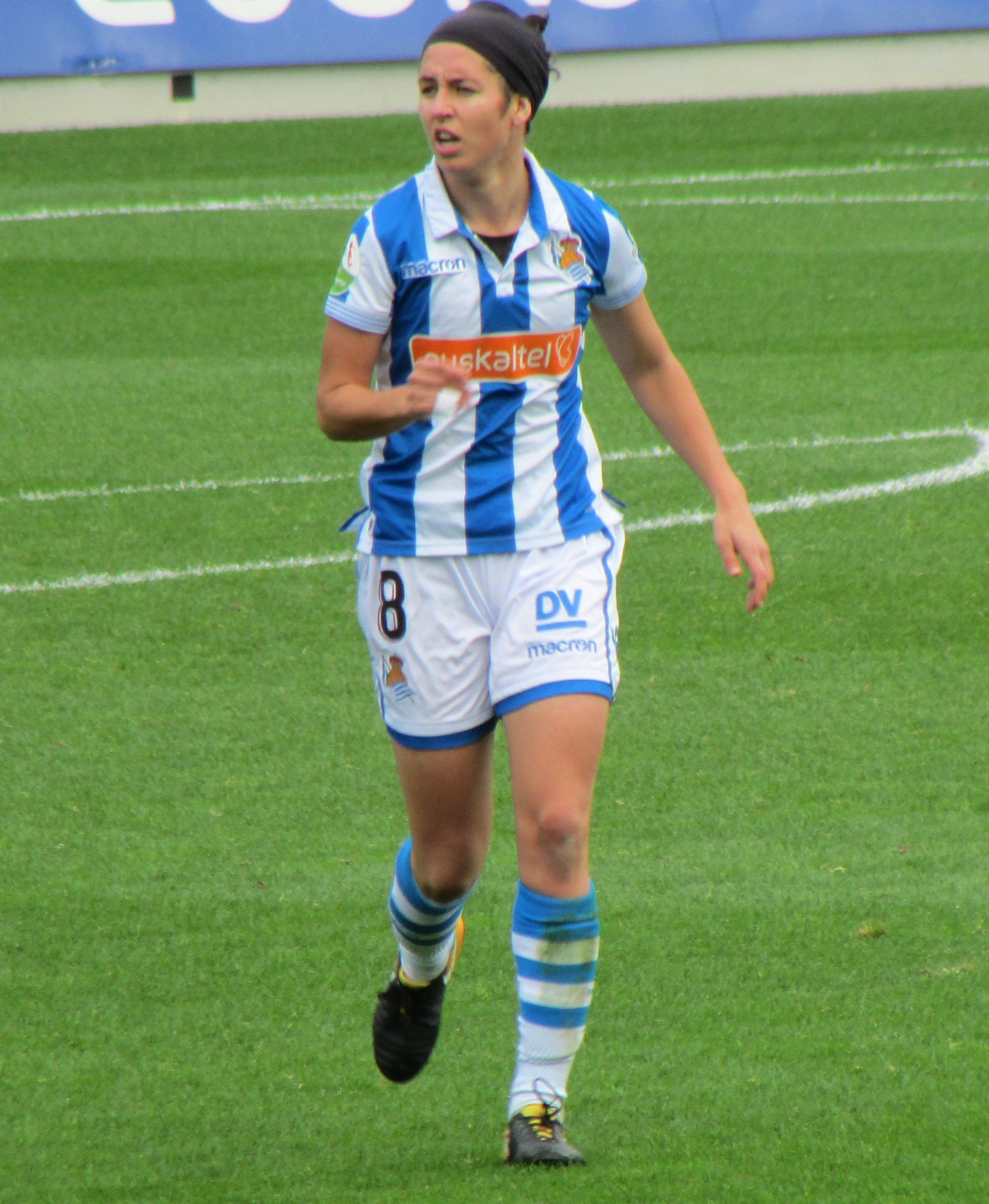
- Uriarte with Real Sociedad

Personal information
- Full name: Itxaso Uriarte Santamaría
- Date of birth: 1 September 1991 (age 35)
- Place of birth: Vitoria-Gasteiz, Spain
- Height: 1.68 m (5 ft 6 in)
- Position: Midfielder

Team information
- Current team: Athletic Club
- Number: 18

Senior career*
Years	Team	Apps	(Gls)
2009–2011	Aurrera Vitoria		
2011–2021	Real Sociedad	248	(18)
2021–2026	Athletic Club	71	(0)
- * Club domestic league appearances and goals as of 10 February 2026

Itxaso Uriarte Santamaría (born 1 September 1991) is a Spanish footballer who plays as a midfielder for Athletic Club.

== Career ==
Uriarte started her career at Aurrera Vitoria. Following ten seasons at Real Sociedad, she transferred to rivals Athletic Club on 2 July 2021. She debuted for Athletic in the opening game of the 2021–22 Primera División season, against Madrid CFF.

Having played in the first match of the 2024–25 Liga F season, Uriarte suffered a relapse of an injury to her right knee which had been causing her problems for two years; she underwent surgery in February 2025, and in July of that year reached an agreement with the club to extend her contract, which had been due to expire.

== Honours ==
Real Sociedad

- Copa de la Reina: 2018–19
