= Artigas Barrios =

Uruguayan politician (1937–2022)

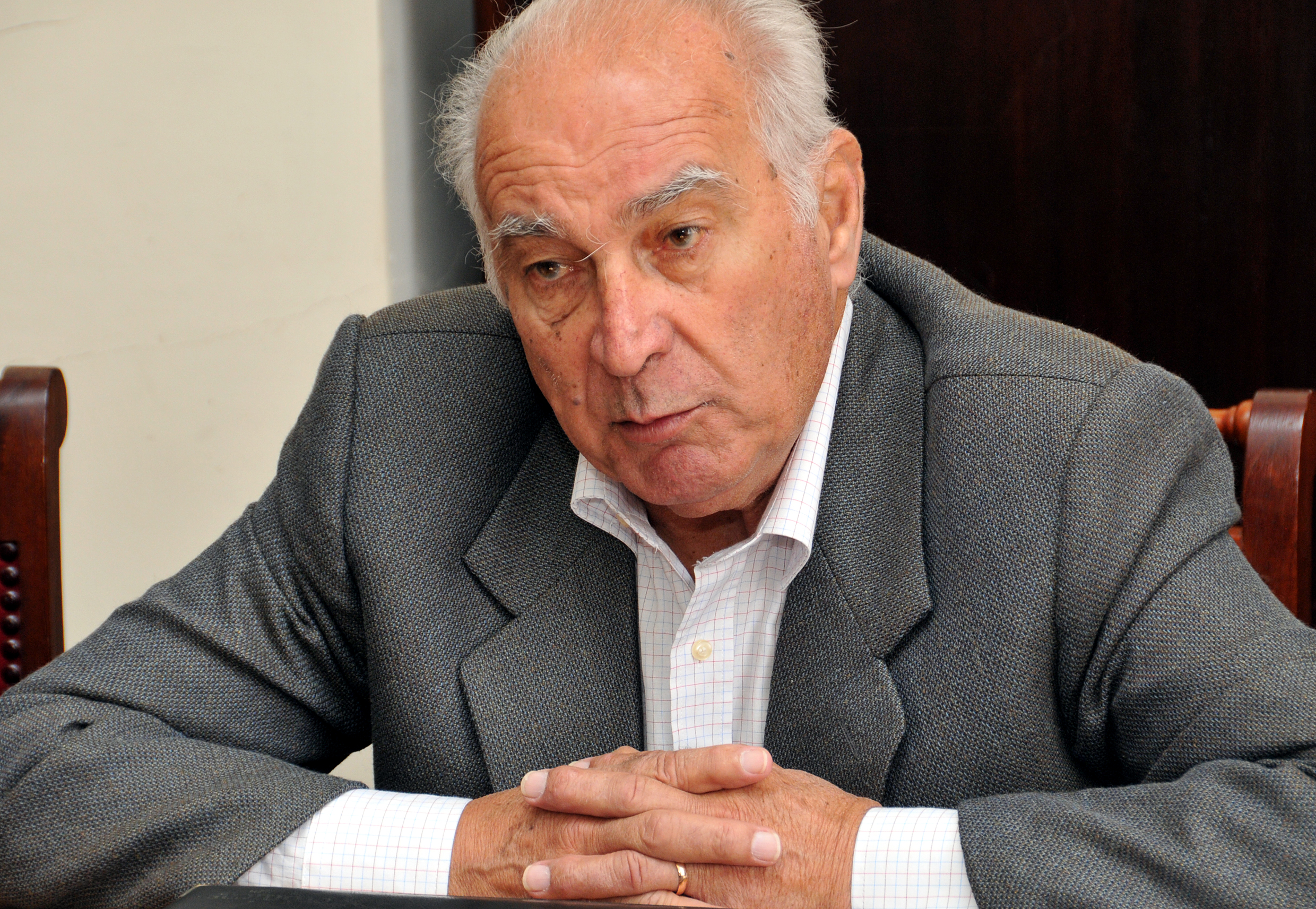
- Barrios in 2013

Intendant of Rocha Department
- In office 2005–2015
- Preceded by: Irineu Riet Correa
- Succeeded by: Aníbal Pereyra

Member of the Chamber of Representatives of Uruguay
- In office 2000–2005

Personal details
- Born: 7 July 1937 Lascano, Uruguay
- Died: 16 June 2022 (aged 84)
- Party: Socialist Party of Uruguay, FA

Artigas Alexis Barrios Fernández (7 July 1937 – 16 June 2022) was a Uruguayan politician.

A member of the Socialist Party of Uruguay and of the Broad Front, he served in the Chamber of Representatives from 2000 to 2005 and was intendant of the Rocha Department from 2005 to 2015.

Barrios died of pneumonia on 16 June 2022, at the age of 84.
