= Luis Miguel Silveira =

Luis Miguel Silveira from the Technical University of Lisbon was named Fellow of the Institute of Electrical and Electronics Engineers (IEEE) in 2012 for contributions to analysis and modeling of VLSI interconnects.
