= Christian Di Candia =

Uruguayan politician

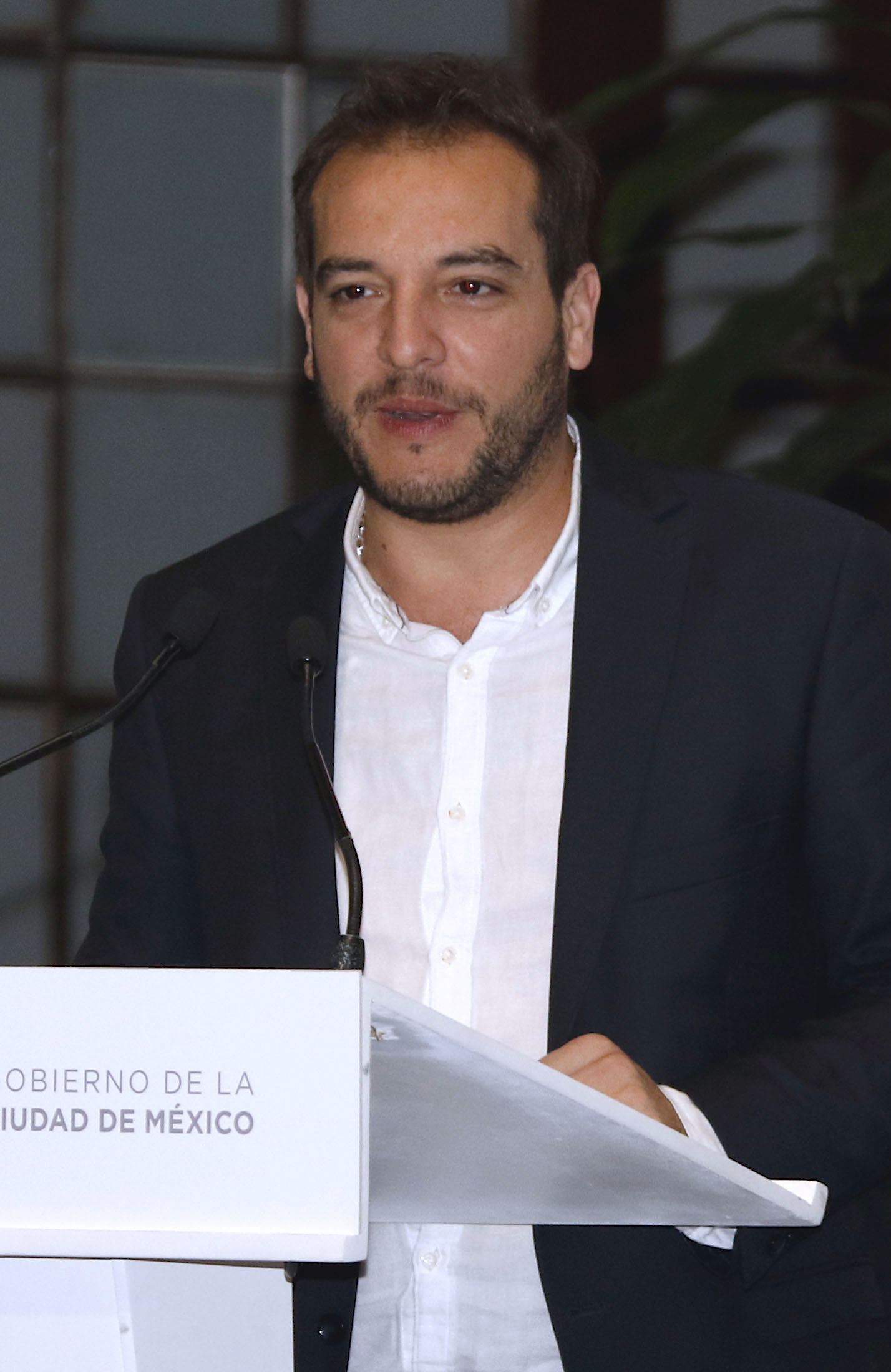
Christian Di Candia on a visit to Mexico City in 2019.

Christian Di Candia Cuña (born 1981 in Montevideo) is a Uruguayan politician, belonging to the Broad Front and Uruguay Assembly.

In 2005, he became secretary of Jota 21, the youth wing of Uruguay Assembly, and a member of the Broad Front's national youth commission. He left Jota 21 in 2007 with a few other activists to form the Magnolia group, which was critical of the Broad Front and Uruguay Assembly.

From April 2019 till November 2020 he was the Intendant of Montevideo, after succeeding Daniel Martínez.
