= Maria Uriarte =

American ecologist

María Uriarte is an ecologist who specializes in the processes that drive tropical forest dynamics, especially after extreme weather events. She is currently a professor in the Department of Ecology, Evolution, and Environmental Science at Columbia University and serves as adjunct faculty in the Department of Ecology at the University of São Paulo, Brazil. She conducts research primarily in Puerto Rico and Brazil and is associated with the Next Generation Ecosystem Experiments (NGEE) tropics and ForestGeo research groups.

== Education and career ==
Uriarte joined the Peace Corps in The Gambia, West Africa in 1989, where she worked with women's agricultural cooperatives in vegetation production improvement. She earned her M.S. in Environmental Studies from Yale School of Forestry and her Ph.D. in Ecology from Cornell University. She did her postdoctoral work at the Cary Institute of Ecosystem Studies, where she studied how forest recover from hurricane disturbances by developing different statistical tools.

== Research ==
Several of Uriarte's projects have been featured in population media outlets, such as The New York Times, PBS and CNN. Much of the covered work on these and other media outlets surrounds the effects of Hurricane Maria on Puerto Rican forest dynamics, and highlights the potential for stronger hurricanes to have adverse effects on forests and accelerate climate change. Other highlighted work included projects that use Artificial Intelligence to identify tropical tree species using aerial photos collected by NASA in El Yunque National Forest, Puerto Rico.

== Honors and awards ==
María Uriarte received the Leopold Leadership Fellowship from the Woods Institute for the Environment, Stanford University and a Science without Borders Fellowship from the Brazilian government.
