= Jorge Pacheco Klein =

Uruguayan political figure and lawyer (born 1964)

Jorge Pacheco Klein (born 1964 in Montevideo) is a Uruguayan political figure and lawyer.

== Background ==
Pacheco Klein is a member of the Uruguayan Colorado Party. His father, Jorge Pacheco Areco, was President of Uruguay 1967–1972.

He is a lawyer by profession and has worked extensively in both Uruguayan and American law.

== Deputy; and subsequent career ==
He was elected in 1994 to serve as a representative, in the House of Representatives of the Congress of Uruguay, for the Colorado Party. Following the death of his father, Jorge Pacheco Areco, in 1998, he resigned his seat as a representative to concentrate on his legal career.

Pacheco Klein emigrated to the United States, where he continued his legal career. Jorge Pacheco Klein's career may be seen as contrary to the longstanding tradition of political families in Uruguay (see links, below); for some Uruguayan politicians with family links in politics take advantage from such links, whereas Jorge Pacheco Klein decided not to.

== See also ==
- Jorge Pacheco Areco § Family background
- Colorado Party (Uruguay)
- List of political families § Uruguay
- Juan Domínguez (Uruguay)#Controversies
