= Jorge Lepra =

Uruguayan diplomat and politician

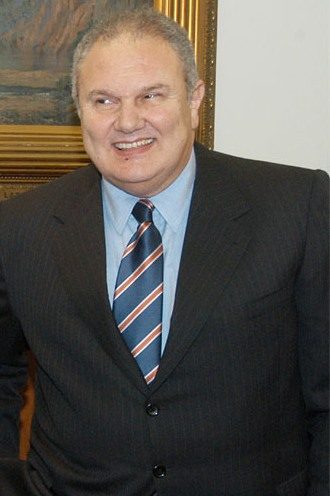
Lepra in August 2005.

Jorge Alberto Lepra Loiodice (4 September 1942 – 4 January 2016) was a Uruguayan diplomat and politician.

== Background ==
Lepra was born in Montevideo. He pursued a business career prior to entering politics. In the early 1990s, he was the general manager of U.S. oil giant Texaco’s operations in Uruguay and served as vice president of the company in Argentina and Uruguay. He was politically independent.

Lepra died from heart failure on 4 January 2016 in Montevideo. He was 73.

== Public offices ==
=== Ministerial rôle ===
Lepra served as Uruguayan Minister of Industry from March 2005 until March 2008, in the government of President of Uruguay Tabaré Vázquez. He resigned from that post to take up a diplomatic appointment, and was succeeded by Daniel Martínez.

=== Ambassador to France ===
From March 2008 to 2010, Lepra served as Uruguayan Ambassador to France.

== See also ==
- Politics of Uruguay
