= Juan Domínguez (politician) =

Uruguayan politician

Juan Domínguez is a Uruguayan political figure.

== Political role ==
He is a deputy in the Chamber of Deputies of Uruguay and belongs to the Movement of Popular Participation, led by José Mujica. This forms part of the Frente Amplio political grouping supporting President of Uruguay Tabaré Vázquez, who took office in 2005.

== Controversies ==
=== Re. parentage of Luis Alberto Lacalle Pou ===
In November 2007 Domínguez was involved in a televised incident in the Chamber of Deputies of Uruguay resulting in a fight with an opposition deputy, Luis Alberto Lacalle Pou. This arose following discussion of ideas about Tupamaros and following unparliamentary language used by Domínguez, widely acknowledged to be derogatory, about the family background of Lacalle Pou, and, more generally, about the existence of political families in Uruguayan politics. (See: List of political families#Uruguay)

==== Disavowal by Frente Amplio and Opposition ====
In the controversy which ensued, spokesmen for the Frente Amplio government and opposition parties disavowed the behaviour among the deputies in connection with the incident.

(See link to article of November 6, 2007, in 'Espectador', below.)

===== Addendum =====
Mr. Lacalle Pou was subsequently elected President of Uruguay in November 2019.

=== Re. the Nin brothers and defence procurement ===
Domínguez has also involved himself in controversies surrounding the Nin brothers (Vice President of Uruguay Rodolfo Nin Novoa and his chief of staff Gonzalo Nin Novoa) and matters relating to defence procurement, notwithstanding their theoretical status as colleagues within the ruling Frente Amplio coalition.

== See also ==
- Politics of Uruguay
- Daisy Tourné#Resignation from Frente Amplio government
