= Santa Clara de Olimar =

- Town
- Location in Uruguay
- Coordinates: 32°55′S 54°57′W
- Country: Uruguay
- Department: Treinta y Tres Department
- Founded: 1878
- Elevation: 320 m (1,050 ft)

Population (2011)
  - Total: 2,341
- Time zone: UTC -3
- Postal code: 37007
- Dial plan: +598 4464 (+4 digits)

Santa Clara de Olimar is a small town in Treinta y Tres Department in eastern Uruguay.

== Geography ==
The town is located on the border with Cerro Largo Department, on Km. 282 of Route 7, about 34 kilometres (21 mi) northeast of Cerro Chato and 20 kilometres (12 mi) southwest of Tupambaé.

== History ==
It was founded as "Olimar" by Decree of 7 March 1878. On 12 June 1911, it was declared a "Pueblo" (village) by the Act of Ley Nº 3.776. It was renamed to "Santa Clara de Olimar" and its status was elevated to "Villa" (town) on 21 August 1962 by the Act of Ley Nº 13.083.

== Population ==
In 2011, Santa Clara de Olimar had a population of 2,341.

| Year | Population |
|---|---|
| 1963 | 2,732 |
| 1975 | 2,829 |
| 1985 | 2,423 |
| 1996 | 2,459 |
| 2004 | 2,305 |
| 2011 | 2,341 |

Source: Instituto Nacional de Estadística de Uruguay

== Places of worship ==
- St. Clare of Assisi Parish Church (Roman Catholic)
