= Uruguay Tourné =

Uruguayan politician (1929–2022)

Uruguay Tourné del Campo (13 May 1929 – 30 November 2022) was a Uruguayan politician.

== Background and early career ==
In his youth, Tourné was an activist for the National Party (Uruguay).

Tourné was an uncle to Daisy Tourné who served as Interior Minister (whom she predeceased).

== Deputy and Senator ==
Tourné was repeatedly elected as Deputy for Montevideo for the years 1963 to 1977, although was obliged to step down prior to the completion of his mandate.

Tourné later served as a Senator from 1985 to 1989.

=== Later political activity ===
In later years he identified with the National Party (Uruguay)'s Herrerismo grouping. He was a supporter of Jorge Larrañaga.

== Personal life and death ==
Tourné died on 30 November 2022, at the age of 93.

== See also ==
- Politics of Uruguay
- List of political families#Uruguay
