= Glenda Rondán =

Uruguayan politician and professor (born 1946)

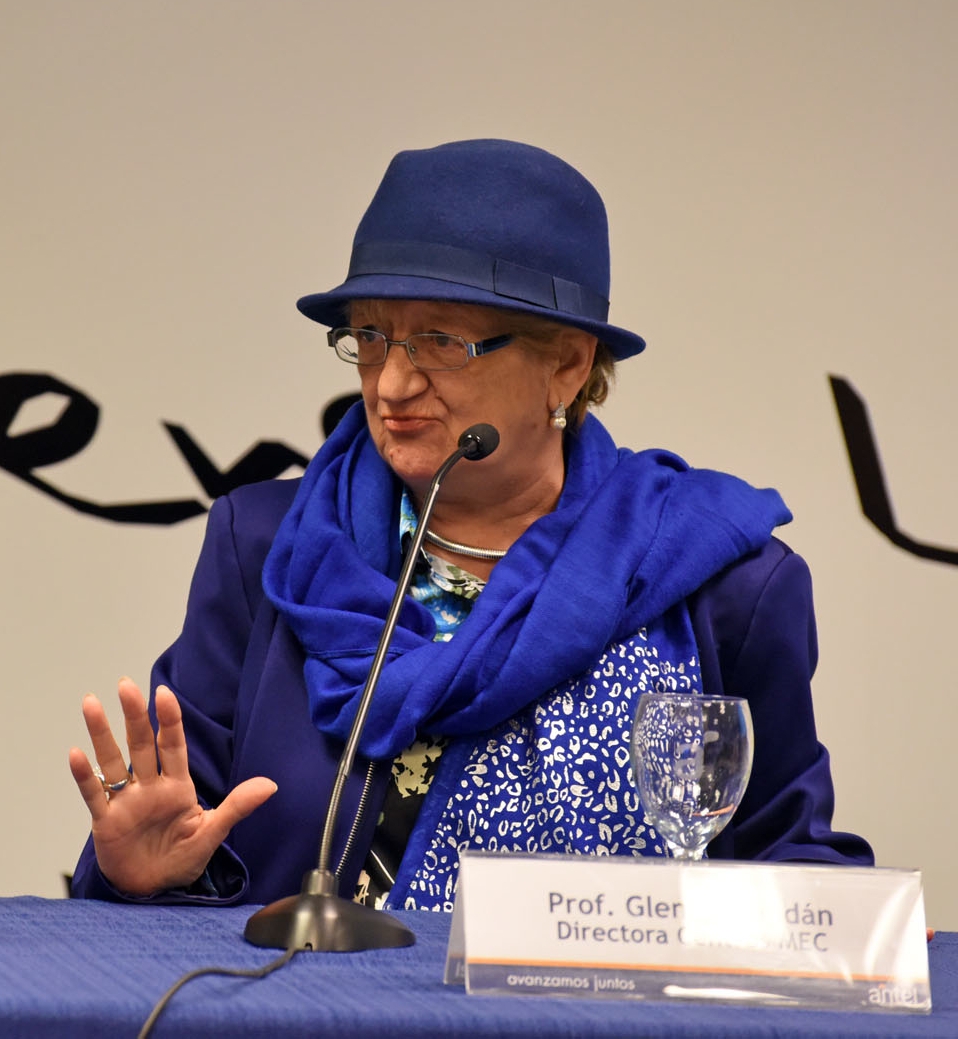
- Rondán in 2016
- Born: Glenda Eulalia del Rosario Rondán Freira; 3 February 1946 (age 80); Melo, Uruguay
- Education: Instituto de Profesores Artigas
- Political party: Colorado Party; Broad Front (2010–present)
- Spouse: Washington Romeo
- Children: Gabriel, Alejandra, Washington Hugo

Glenda Eulalia del Rosario Rondán Freira (born 3 February 1946) is a Uruguayan professor and politician, currently a member of the Broad Front.

== Biography ==
Married to Washington Romeo, Rondán had three children: Gabriel, Alejandra, and Washington Hugo (died 2005). She has two grandchildren, Mathías and Micaela.

She graduated as a Professor of Literature from the Instituto de Profesores Artigas (IPA).

== Political activity ==
Rondán served in the Colorado Party beginning in adolescence. During the 1960s she was the secretary of the deputies Luis Bernardo Pozzolo and Julio María Sanguinetti (who was later twice president of the Republic). During the civic-military dictatorship, she was kidnapped and detained in a military unit.

She was elected as an alternate official on several occasions, first in 1984, for the department of Montevideo. In the 1999 elections in which Jorge Batlle captured the Presidency of the Republic, Rondán was elected deputy for Lista 15, holding the position of vice president of the Chamber of Deputies for the term 2000–2005, and coming to occupy the ownership of the presidency of the Chamber. She has always stood out as a fighter for women's rights; along with fellow deputies Beatriz Argimón, Lucía Topolansky, and Margarita Percovich, she constituted the so-called "Women's Bank", composed of women from all parties. She was part of the Equity and Gender Commission, which she chaired in 2001.

In the 2005 municipal elections she headed the list of candidates of Lista 15 to the departmental board of Montevideo, being comfortably elected. That year she was elected to the national executive committee of the Colorado Party (CEN).

In 2009 she supported the presidential candidacy of José Amorín Batlle in the sector Batllismo Siglo XXI with the group "Contra viento & marea", obtaining a place in the National Convention of the Party. For the second round, Rondán said that, against her party's recommendion, she would not vote for candidate Luis Alberto Lacalle of the National Party, but she would for the Broad Front candidate, José Mujica.

She did not support any candidate in the municipal elections of May 2010.

On 20 June 2010, Rondán announced her move to the Broad Front, along with a Batllist column led by her.

Rondán worked as an advisor on gender and equity issues, and is currently director of the centers of the country's Ministry of Education and Culture.

== Other activities ==
In 2007, together with National Party deputy Beatriz Argimón and various Uruguayan actresses and women public figures, Rondán appeared in the play The Vagina Monologues for the benefit of the Casa de la Mujer and for the cause of denouncing violence against women.
