= Daoiz Uriarte =

Uruguayan lawyer, professor, and politician (born 1956)

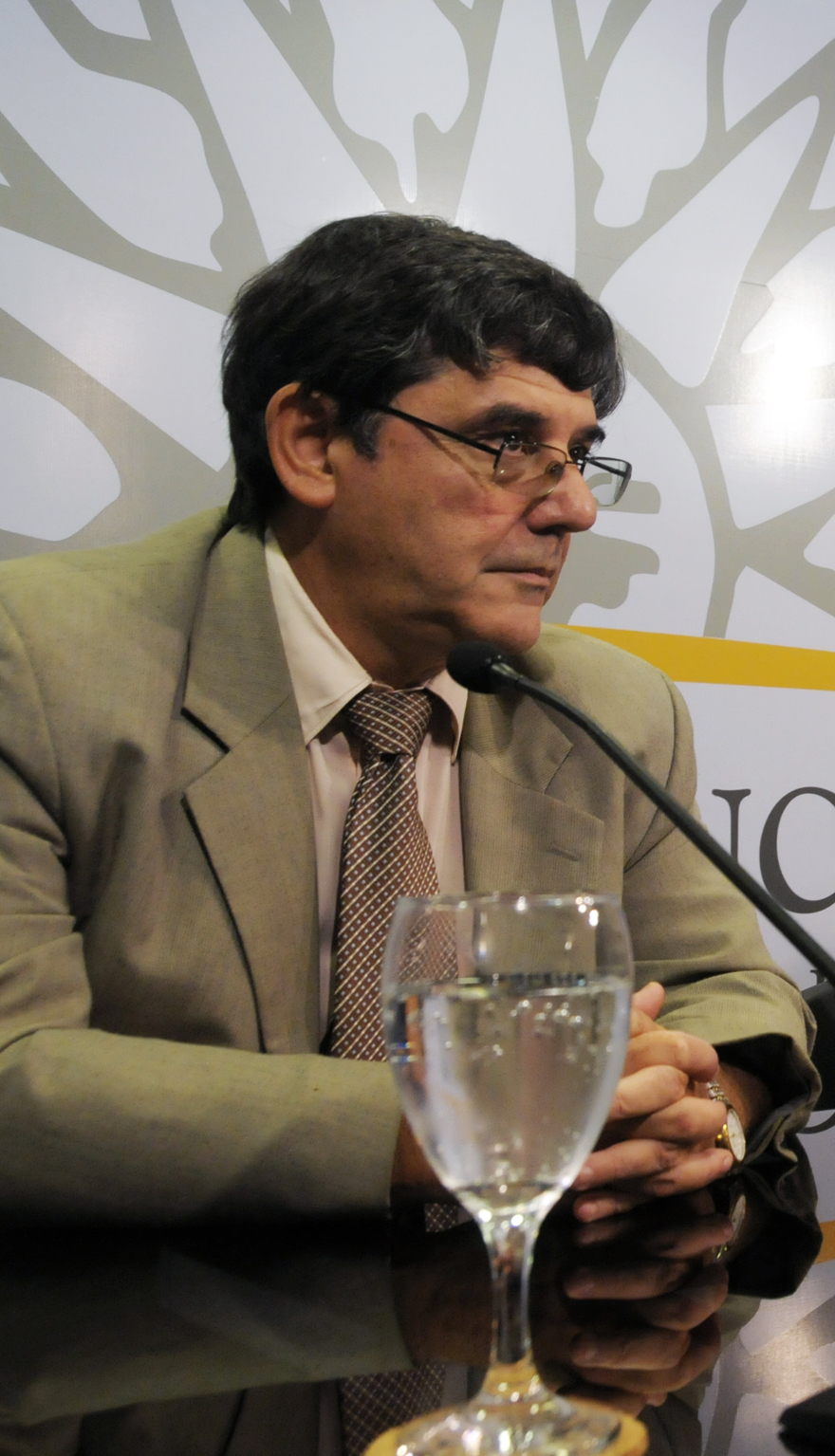
Dr. Daoiz Uriarte in 2011

Daoiz Gerardo Uriarte Araújo (born September 24, 1956, Montevideo, Uruguay) is a lawyer, professor and Uruguayan politician member of the moderate sector Vertiente Artiguista, Frente Amplio coalition, the party which ruled Uruguay from 2005 to 2019.

== Life and career ==
After the coup d'état took place in Uruguay on 27 June 1973, Daoiz Uriarte (then 19 years old), was, like many others left-wingers, tortured and imprisoned for more than 2 years. After his liberation he went on to "University of the Republic" and became a lawyer in 1987. He has advised some of the most important public unions in Uruguay, and national and international human rights organisations. It is also known for being the lawyer of former Mayor of Montevideo, Arq. Mariano Arana. He actually serves as Vice President of Obras Sanitarias del Estado (Uruguay's state-owned water utility). He also teaches Human Rights Law at the Uruguayan public university "University of the Republic" (Spanish: Universidad de la República, sometimes UdelaR).

== Bibliography ==
- Los derechos humanos y el gobierno municipal, (Junta Departamental de Montevideo, 2009)
- Curso de Derechos Humanos y sus garantías, (Fundación de Cultura Universitaria, 2013)
