= Claudio Williman =

Uruguayan political figure

Claudio Wílliman
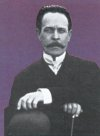
- Claudio Wílliman

20th President of Uruguay
- In office 1 March 1907 – 1 March 1911
- Preceded by: José Batlle y Ordóñez
- Succeeded by: José Batlle y Ordóñez

Personal details
- Born: October 10, 1861 Montevideo, Uruguay
- Died: February 9, 1934 (aged 72) Montevideo, Uruguay
- Party: Colorado Party
- Profession: Lawyer

Claudio Wílliman Gonzalez (10 October 1861 in Montevideo – 9 February 1934 in Montevideo) was a Uruguayan political figure.

== Background ==
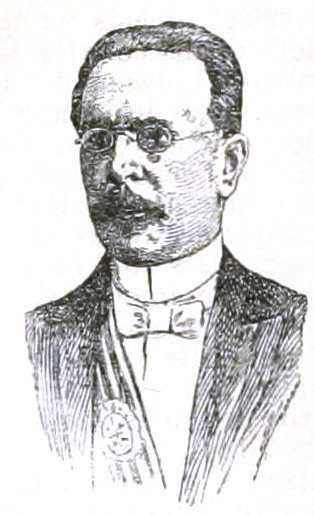

Claudio Wílliman's parents, José Williman and Antonia González, were immigrants from Galicia, Spain. José Wílliman's parents himself came from Savoy, France, with Alsatian roots.

Williman studied at the University of Montevideo and graduated with a Doctorate in Law and Social Sciences in 1887. From his adolescence he devoted his intellectual activity to teaching. In 1885 he was appointed professor of Physics at the University, and two years later was entrusted with the chair of the same subject at the Military School. Williman also taught classes in Cosmography and Physical Geography at the Military School, during the first years of its operation, and also taught at various private institutes. He was also, as noted by one study, “one of the initiators of the foundation of the Faculty of Mathematics and was part of its faculty from the first days of its installation, being entrusted with the chair of Industrial Physics that he held for many years.” In 1913, the Council of that Faculty granted Williman the title of "ad-honorem" Professor, without a fixed subject, a distinction that ratified by decree of the P.E. Earlier, in 1890, Williman was appointed Dean of the Faculty of Secondary and Preparatory Education. His performance earned him the Chamber of Doctors including him up to three times in the shortlist of candidates for the Rectorate of the University, and In 1902 he was appointed Rector of the University, a position he resigned two years later to occupy the position of Minister of Government. Eight years later, he returned in 1912 to be appointed Rector of the University, a position he resigned in 1915 when he was appointed President of the Board of Directors of the Bank of the Republic. Following his assumption of the Rectorate Williman proposed to provide the University with the necessary buildings to house its different departments. According to one study, “the construction of the current University buildings was due to his management, which Dr. Williman himself inaugurated in 1911, when he was President of the Republic.” In 1903, Williman began the founding of the School of Commerce and also laid the foundations of the School of Veterinary Medicine that same year. While these works of progress were carried out “the University reorganized all its services, reviewed the study plans, improved the teaching material and disciplined the teaching staff, a work that culminated in the university law of 1908, prepared and promulgated during his Presidency.”

Wílliman was a member of the Uruguayan Colorado Party and was closely identified with the liberal José Batlle y Ordóñez. His political actions dated back to the days preceding the Quebracho revolution. Williman was an incorporated into a group that maintained the resistance against the Government of General Santos, taking an active part in the journalistic campaigns of the time. When the 1886 revolution was organized he went to join its ranks. Williman invaded with the expeditionary army and fought in the action of Palmares de Soto, later, according to one study, “falling prisoner with the best of the revolutionary youth.” On returning home he closed the first cycle of his political activity and for many years devoted himself exclusively to the activity of the professor, to the management of the university institution and to the work of his law firm. In the 1898 elections Williman was elected member of the J.E.A. of Montevideo and in that corporation acted as Director of the Treasury. He was also elected member of the Electoral Board. Williman was serving his elective position as councilor when President Cuestas offered him the Ministry of Public Works, but he declined this offer. When the 1904 revolution broke out Williman was entrusted with the 4th of G. G. N. N. In April 1904 Williman took charge of the Ministry of the Interior, and some months later, since the titular Minister of War and Navy, General Vázquez, had gone out on campaign, that Portfolio was also entrusted to Williman, at whose head he found the peace of September 1904.

His grandson José Claudio Wílliman served in the Uruguayan Senate 1985–1990.

== President of Uruguay ==
Williman was chosen by Batlle to succeed him as Uruguayan presidents were constitutionally barred from serving consecutive terms. Batlle’s naming of Williman as his preferred successor came in late 1905. On October the 15th 1905 the newspaper “El Siglio” stated “The President of the Republic has told his friends among the legislators that the candidacy of Doctor Claudio Williman for future President of the Republic is the one which he prefers.” As noted by one study, “Visitors to Batlle’s house in Montevideo were much in evidence. Within 3 days, more than enough vote pledges were secured from the Colorado legislators to assure Williman’s election as the next President.” On October the 30th, the formal proclamation of Williman signed by 53 Colorado legislators, which was more than the constitutional majority, was published. A campaign was launched to popularize Williman’s candidacy, with biographies circulated and committees formed to explain his virtues. In addition to local newspapers in the interior coming out for Williman, all the new Colorado departmental organizations formally announced their support for him, with this Trienta y Tres statement, as noted by one study, being typical: “The Departmental Committee believes itself to be interpreting the will of the coreligionaries of the department who see in Dr. Williman the surest guarantee that his government will carry on in the progressive currents ably sown by the present administration.”

In 1907 Williman was elected President of the Republic for the period 1907-1911 by the General Assembly.

His policies generally followed those of Batlle. Williman had indicated that he would continue Batlle’s policies in a speech he made to the legislature after taking the oath of office. In his speech, he praised the outgoing government for “its noble and just preoccupation with the betterment of the humble” and called for measures such as a new Ministry of Public Education, a government labor office, reorganisation of public charity, and regulation of corporations. He also stated the need “to resolve the problem of populating the interior, which in the midst of great prosperity remains half deserted, since it is not the existence of a handful of great fortunes which constitutes the wealth of a nation.” As noted by one study, “This last sentence got a great round of applause, and the whole speech sat well with the Colorado legislators.”

A number of projects were approved during Williman’s presidency, including Credits from the Banco de la República for farmers and Reorganization and modernization of the Department of Livestock and Agriculture. A 1908 law provided for the safeguarding of pensions and wages against garnishment. A number of laws were passed concerning commercial, criminal and civil matters, including ones related to the conditional release of convicts, absolute divorce, marks of factory and trade, the legitimacy of natural children, abolition of the death penalty, and the abolition of the third instance in criminal matters. Propaganda against occupational diseases was carried out, and posters containing prophylactic measures against carbuncle or bad grain and other diseases were distributed throughout the country. Departmental Hygiene Inspections were also established to replace Councils which had been in operation since 1895. A Labor Office was also installed. Williman had called for the establishment of a Labor Office or institute, “destined to study everything that is related to the progress of the industries and the aspirations of the workers, in order to cooperate in the solution of the questions and conflicts and, prepare the most opportune legislation in this matter.” Through Law 3,147 of 1907 the Ministry of Industry, Labor and Public Instruction was established. In 1911 a military pension fund was established “to administer survivors’ pensions for all military officers.” Many new public schools were also built, and in 1908 the Executive Power requested and obtained sanction of a law authorizing the creation of the National Institute for the Deaf. Money was also spent on public improvements, such as transit and sanitary works. Many public works were carried out. In the capital this included the extension and completion of Boulevard Artigas al Sud, completion of Avenida Brasil, completion of Rambla Pocitos, construction of the Agricultural Market, construction of the Military and Naval School building, construction of the Blandengues Regiment barracks, police buildings, and groups of school buildings. According to one study “In the departments there were innumerable road works, construction of bridges, sanitation, municipal services, canalizations, dredging, authorization of ports, layout and extension of railways, carried out by the same administration, whose intense work was translated in the economic and financial order in the constantly reproduced fact of the "surplus" in the annual exercises.” 392 schools were also built, almost all of which rural. A law of February the 24th 1911, “completely regulated the loss and restitution of parental authority, guardianship of minors and the creation of the Council for the Protection of Minors,” and a law of 1908 “recognized the right of all mothers to proper maternity care,” although in the absence of any machinery this was “a counsel of perfection” until Montevideo in 1915 opened its maternity hospital with 150 beds. In 1909, the Executive Power requested and obtained the abolition of a 5% discount on salaries that public employees had been subject to since 1893. The School Medical Corps was created by law of the Nation and regulated in 1908, entrusting it with “the mission of hygienic surveillance of school buildings, teaching staff, school materials, furniture, programs, prophylaxis of infectious-contagious diseases, study of school retarded, etc., designating 4 members to perform these tasks.” Developments in public assistance took place, with one presidential message from 1910 noting "Equally worthy of mention, under another concept, are the results obtained by the change of regime in the Maternal and Foundling Homes, with the operation of the " Gota de Leche " clinic, whose benefits have been completed with the holding of popular conferences on childcare, dedicated to mothers, and the creation of the Vacation Colony, which has just been joined by children belonging to Public Schools and poor parents, protected by the "Uruguayan League against Tuberculosis." In addition, the Montevideo Electric Power Station and the state-owned Bank of the Republic also expanded under Williman’s administration.

In 1910, public assistance was reorganized by a law "voted unanimously by both chambers" that established in Montevideo a general directorate and a Public Assistance council and in the departments “delegated doctors in charge of the functions local.” According to the law, every individual indigent or deprived of resources had “the right to free public assistance at the expense of the State.” This included services such as child protection, assistance and protection of pregnant women and women in labor, assistance and guardianship of homeless children, assistance and protection of homeless, invalid and chronic elderly, and sick care. Following the passage of this law 5 new pavilions were built in the House of Isolation, the Germán Segura pavilion was enlarged; and a laboratory was set up in the Psychiatric Clinic of the Insane Asylum along with an external office in the Asylum for Foundlings and Orphans. In addition various establishments "have received aid and subsidies, including the Hospital Galán y Rocha, in Paysandú, and the one in Colonia are nearing completion; the one in Rosario has been inaugurated, and first aid rooms have been set up in Colonia, Rivera and Treinta y Tres."

Not all reform measures proposed by William and others, however, were approved during his presidency. In 1908, the head of the Labor Office Dr. Juan José Amézaga presented a bill on workplace accidents which was passed immediately by the Executive Branch passed to the Assembly. As established by this project, employers or entrepreneurs who are in charge of exploiting an industry or carrying out work included in this law (such as mines, quarries, factories, metallurgical workshops, mines, quarries and factories) “were civilly liable for all accidents that occur to their workers or employees due to their work or due to it.” Pensions would be provided in cases of absolute or permanent incapacity, partial and permanent disability, temporary disability, and death. The Work Commission of the Chamber of Deputies, accepted the general lines of the project in an important study, which led “to the rapid sanction of the law in that branch of the Legislative Body.” However, a different environment prevailed in the Chamber of Senators, and the project remained there until it was sanctioned in 1920. As noted by one observer, “The Chamber approved a project to regulate work accidents on September 28, 1909. The Senate Legislation Committee came here, studied it, and modified a large part of the project, expanding and correcting it.” Williman himself was a supporter of accident insurance, having advocated this himself during his presidency.

In regards to agriculture, as noted by one historian, Williman considered “the development of agriculture, which brings with it the increase of population and production…the greatest problem of national economic life.” On December the 11th 1909, he sent a bill to the legislature which provided for the land tax to be doubled on nay property over 100 hectares “which did not devote at least 5 percent of its land area to agriculture.” Ranchers, however, petitioned the legislature via a powerful organization known as the Rural Association to reject the bill as a denial of property rights, and Williman, as noted by one study, didn’t propose to fight the ranchers, who were organized, prosperous and strong, contenting himself by noting “Whatever the outcome of discussion this Government will always have the satisfaction of having valiantly pointed out the evil and having proposed an energetic remedy to combat it.” As noted by one study, “The Bill never came out of committee.”

In 1910, the Executive Power offered a pension scheme for agricultural and industrial workers whose annual wage didn’t exceed $300. A plan was also devised by the Insurance Bank “but the lack of satisfactory statistics, the unwillingness of business to submit to the mounting expense of social legislation, and the absence of any wide margin in the wage scale that might be used for employee contributions to a pension fund, checked the acceptance of these plans.” The extension of the retirement pension system to private industry later began with the passage of a law of the 6th of October 1919 that provided for the pensioning of employees in the water, telephone, tramway, telegraph, railway and gas distributing services.

In addition, while a measure for progressive inheritance taxes encouraged by Batlle also became law under Williman, but as noted by one historian “the bill was so amended that in its first year the progressive tax yielded only 29,278 pesos more than the previous inheritance tax had.” In addition, the bill Batlle submitted to provide for an eight-hour workday was, as noted by one study, “transformed in committee to what amounted to an eleven-hour day.” While in Europe, Batlle advised Domingo Arena, a close ally of his, to keep the bill from being debated until his return “and get a real eight-hour day enacted.”

Also, compared with his predecessor Batlle, Williman took a less friendly approach to labor unions. This was demonstrated in February 1908 when a workers on the Midland line struck over the dismissal of four workers. As one historian has noted of the event:

“Workers on the connecting and major Central line to Montevideo refused to handle Midland cars. The Central brought railroad men from Buenos Aires, and at its request received 2,500 Uruguayan soldiers to guard the trains. Strikers attempted to stop the trains by weakening rails and putting oil and soap in locomotive boilers. William responded by closing down union halls, prohibiting strike meetings, and forbidding strikers from going near the railroad.”

The strike eventually collapsed, and the Central only took back those who they didn’t consider union activists. In addition, previous concessions were revoked, while from now on management would exclusively set working conditions. The Central’s manager and its attorney praised William “for the measures adopted by the government during the emergency” and the railroad union, the Ferrocarrilera, dissolved.

== Post Presidency ==
He was succeeded by Batlle who was re-elected in 1911. He returned to the Senate of Uruguay but then left it to become president of the Banco de la República Oriental del Uruguay in 1916. He held that position until 1928.

When his presidential term ended, Williman resigned authority into the hands of his successor and left shortly after for Europe on a rest trip. The whole of 1911 and part of 1912 was dedicated to touring European countries and when Williman returned to the country it was to occupy the position of Rector of the University. Williman at the head of the Rectorate when in 1913 he was elected Senator for the department of Río Negro, a position he inevitably resigned.

Wílliman lived to see much of his and Battle y Ordóñez's democratic legacy destroyed — at least temporarily — by President Gabriel Terra, who reinforced his presidential rule in a coup d'état in 1933.

=== Death and legacy ===
Williman was seen as the de facto caretaker president of Uruguay chosen by José Batlle y Ordóñez to succeed him after his first term in office. Williman, however, disliked the idea of being seen as a stand-in for Batlle, telling an historian in 1905 that “Neither by temperament, by education, nor by the principles I have always maintained would I have agreed to a merely inert and purely decorative retention of the government. And if I am not a man capable of accepting such a situation, neither was my predecessor a man capable of making such a demand, be it said in his honor.”

In later years, William expressed criticism towards a view that his government had been conservative, telling an Argentine historian that “in the area of economic, social, and labor reforms, my government differed so fundamentally from that of señor Batlle y Ordoñez, that my government was considered, not entirely justly, conservative.”

Wílliman died in 1934.

A road in Punta del Este and one in Punta Carretas are named after him.

== See also ==
- Politics of Uruguay
- List of political families#Uruguay

Political offices
Preceded by José Batlle y Ordóñez	President of Uruguay; 1907–1911	Succeeded by José Batlle y Ordóñez
