= Eudoro Melo =

Uruguayan poet, politician, and journalist (1889–1975)

Eudoro Melo (1889–1975) was an Uruguayan poet, politician, and journalist.

== Works ==
=== Literary production ===
- Soul Hits (1926)
- Elite Which Prose (1930)
- Nomad (1931)
- Prometheus (1965)

=== Hymns ===
- "Ode to Coast" (music by Bernardo Martinez Irigaray (1930)
- "Ode to the Red Cross' (music by Vincent Ascone)
- "Hymn to the National Flag"
- "Hymn to the Tree" (music by Victor Gamba)
- "Ode to the Industrial School" (music by Alfredo Zipitria Frioni)
- "Ode to La Paz" (music by Victor Gamba)
