= Rómulo Rossi =

Uruguayan politician

Rómulo Rossi (1879–1945) was a Uruguayan politician, journalist and writer. He was born in Canelones on January 29, 1879.

== Works ==
- Tasty old Montevideo Chronicles (1897)
- Municipal Administration
- Old memories and chronic (1922)
- Historical episodes (Imp Peña Bros. 1923)
- Memories and old chronicles vol. II (Imp Peña Bros. 1924 )
- Memories and old chronicles vol. III (published in daily chronic Morning. Imp Peña Bros. 1928 )
- Men and anecdotes (Imp Pena Brothers Bound in Col. Median Lafinur. 1928)
- Revolution or Mutiny? Slopes and July 4, 1898. (Imp Commercial Gazette. 1932)
- Tupambaé! The reconquest of the corpse of Colonel Knight (1935)
- Old and new-style
- Episodes Trojans
- The story of the day
- Santos and his times
- From the heroic
