= Diana Saravia Olmos =

Uruguayan notary and political figure

Diana Saravia Olmos is a Uruguayan notary and political figure.

== Background and previous political alliances ==
While the National Party's Aparicio Saravia was a collateral family forebear, she is a former Deputy, and former supporter of 'Pachequismo' and subsequently the Ballistas within the Colorado Party (Uruguay). She was formerly seen as politically close to Jorge Pacheco Klein, who, however, left the country in 1998.

== Current political alignment with Pedro Bordaberry Herrán ==
In 2008 Saravia adhered to Pedro Bordaberry Herrán's 'Vamos Uruguay' grouping within the Colorado Party. Partly given her family background and her past association with 'Pachequismo', she is thus thought to add to the potential of 'Vamos Uruguay' to attract support beyond the Colorado Party's traditional electoral backers.

== See also ==
- Politics of Uruguay
- Colorado Party (Uruguay)#Post 2004: defeat at polls and rise of Pedro Bordaberry
- Pedro Bordaberry#Bordaberry and Riversita resurgence
