= José Claudio Wílliman =

Uruguayan lawyer and political figure

José Claudio Wílliman (1925–2006) was a Uruguayan lawyer and political figure.

== Background ==
Wílliman was born in Montevideo. A Doctor of Laws, he was a university teacher for many years. His grandfather, Claudio Wílliman was a Colorado Party President of Uruguay 1907–1911.

== Political activities and office ==
José Claudio Wílliman was a prominent member of the Uruguayan National (Blanco) Party. As a younger man, he was involved with Ruralist activism.

He served in the Uruguayan Senate 1985–1990.

== Death ==
He died in 2006.

== See also ==
- Politics of Uruguay
- List of political families § Uruguay
