= Julio Silveira =

Uruguayan politician

Executive Mayor of the National Party
- In office 1984–2000

Member of the Chamber of Representatives of Uruguay
- In office 2000–2005

Intendant of the Artigas Department
- In office 2005–2009
- Preceded by: Carlos Signorelli
- Succeeded by: Patricia Ayala

Personal details
- Born: 27 June 1953 (age 71); Artigas, Uruguay
- Political party: National Party

Julio Silveira (born 27 June 1953) is a Uruguayan politician. He served as a member of the Chamber of Representatives of Uruguay from 2000 to 2005.

Silveira served as the executive mayor of the major political party National Party of Uruguay from 1984 to 2000. He was elected to serve as a member of the Chamber of Representatives of Uruguay in 1999. Silveira assumed his office in 2000, serving until 2005. He also served as the intendant of the northernmost department Artigas Department from 2005 to 2009. The following year, Silveira became director of the national postal service Correo Uruguayo. He served until 2013.

Silveira currently serves as the vice president of the Correo Uruguayo since 22 June 2020.
