= Washington García Rijo =

Uruguayan politician (1921–2010)

Washington García Rijo (12 February 1921 – 22 September 2010) was a Uruguayan political figure.

== Background ==
His political base was in Rocha Department. He formerly served as a senior police officer. He was a member of the Colorado Party.

== Political career ==
He served for many years as an elected Deputy of the Republic from 1967 to 1972 and from 1985 to 1990, representing Rocha Department. He was at the time associated with the 'Lista 15' grouping within the Colorado Party. In his late political life he endorsed Pedro Bordaberry Herrán's 'Vamos Uruguay' grouping within the Colorado Party (Uruguay).

== See also ==
- Politics of Uruguay
- Colorado Party (Uruguay)#Post 2004: defeat at polls and rise of Pedro Bordaberry Herrán
