= Ariel Riani =

Uruguayan politician (1926–2019)

Ariel Riani (12 October 1926 – 30 March 2019) was a Uruguayan politician and business figure.

== Career ==
He served as police chief of Artigas during the presidency of Jorge Pacheco Areco. This period attracted international comment for the stringent law enforcement methods adopted by Pacheco's government. Riani also served as 'Intendente' (political head) of Artigas Department.

He was a member of Uruguay's Colorado Party, and was, for many years, identified with the country's mining interests. In 2008 Riani campaigned on behalf of the 'Vamos Uruguay' grouping led by Pedro Bordaberry Herrán, within the Colorado Party. He died in March 2019 in Artigas at the age of 92.

== See also ==
- Politics of Uruguay
- Colorado Party (Uruguay)#Pedro Bordaberry and Riverista resurgence
- Fructuoso Rivera#Later legacy
