= Margarita Percovich =

Uruguayan politician

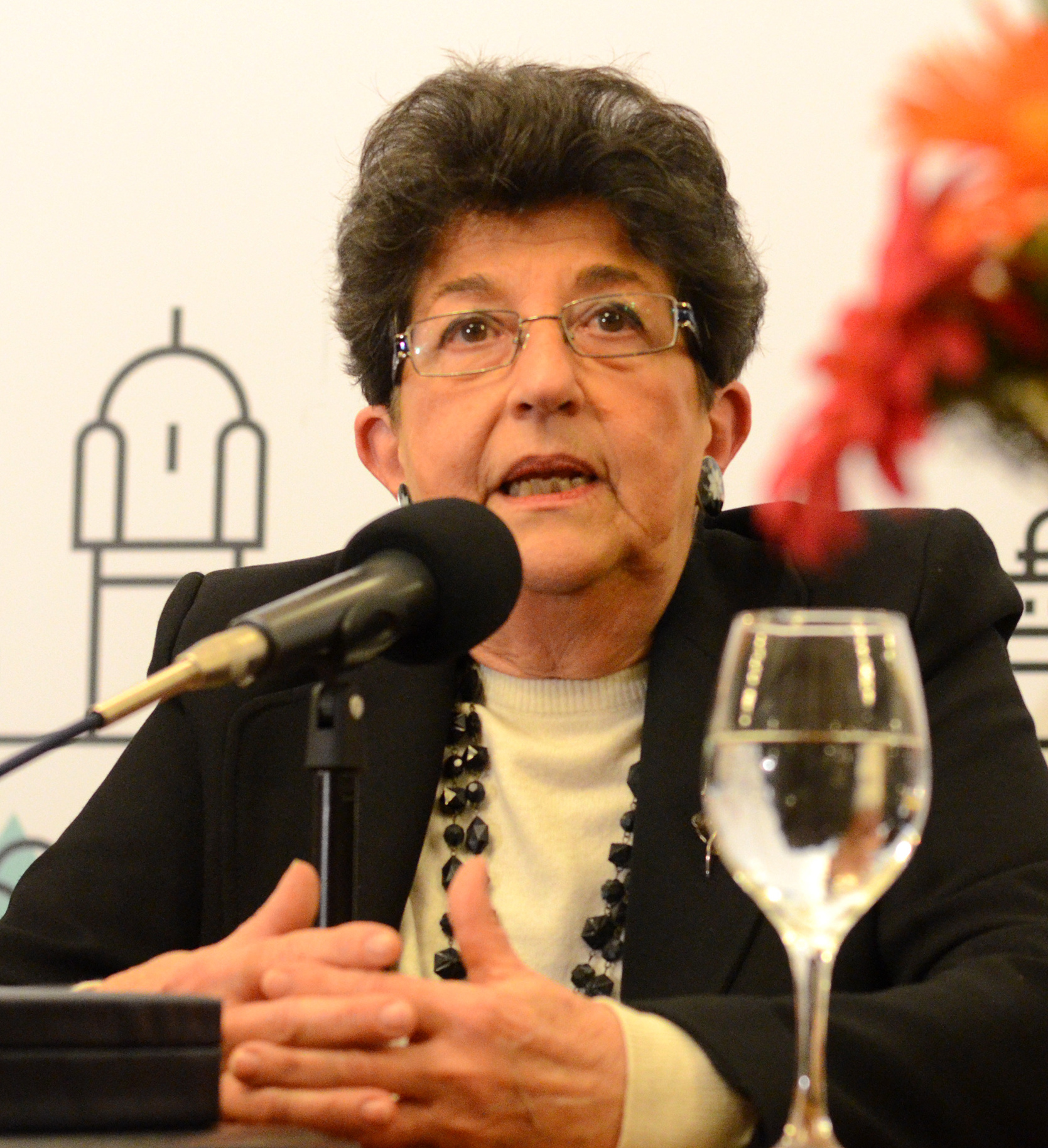
- Born: María Margarita Percovich Aldabe; 21 January 1941 (age 85); Montevideo, Uruguay
- Education: Universidad de la República
- Occupation: politician
- Title: Senator
- Political party: Broad Front

María Margarita Percovich Aldabe (born 21 January 1941) is an Uruguayan former politician and activist. A member of the Broad Front, she served as Senator of the Republic from 2005 to 2010 and as National Representative from 2000 to 2005. She was one of the drafters of the 2007 Sexual and Reproductive Health bill that sought to legalize abortion, but which, after being approved in parliament, was vetoed by President Tabaré Vázquez.

== Early life ==
She was born in Montevideo in 1941, into a Croatian-Uruguayan family. She attended Santo Domingo School of the Dominican Order and Sacré Cœur School.
