= Daisy Tourné =

Uruguayan politician (1951–2022)

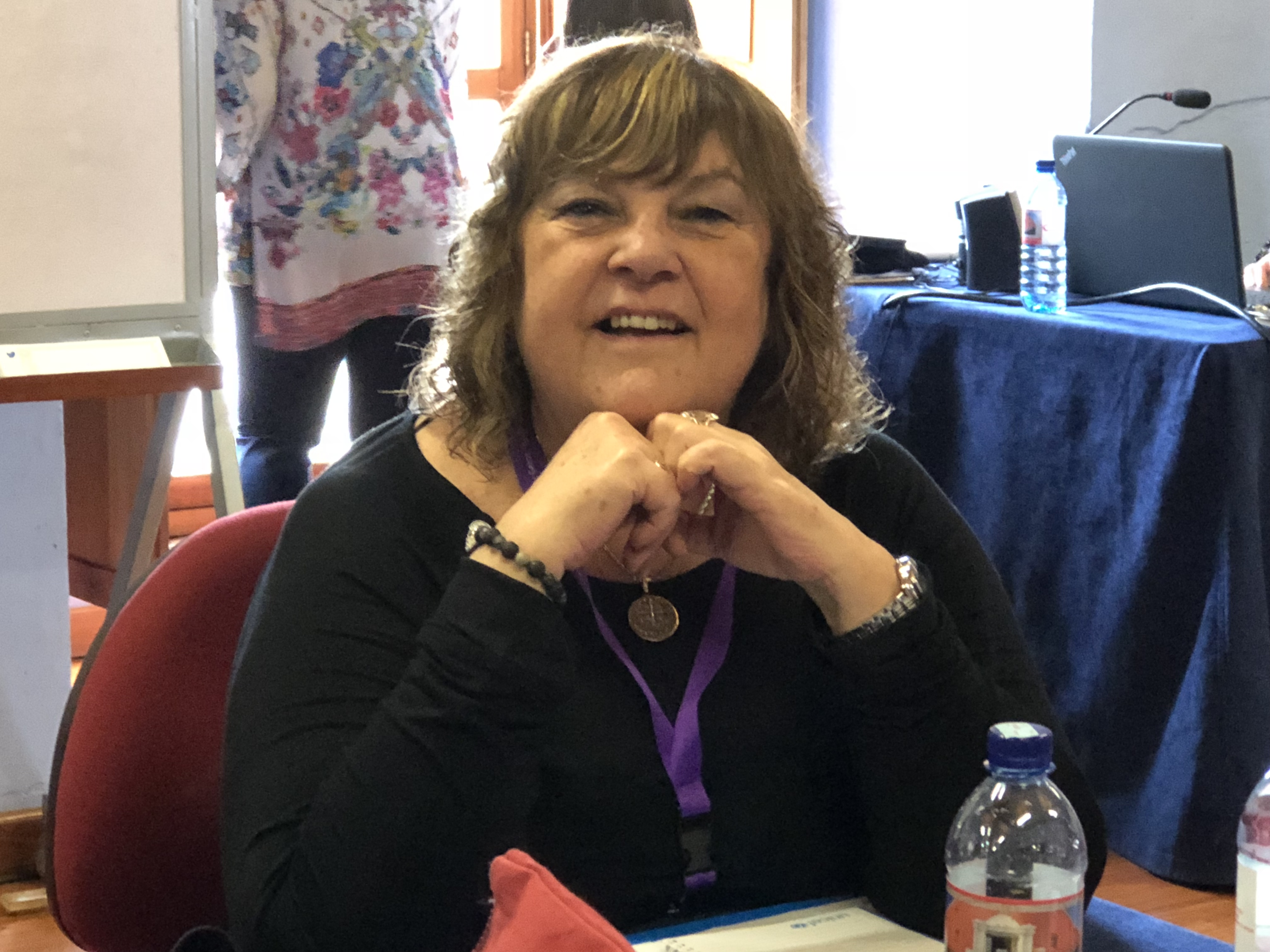
- Tourné in 2018
- Born: Daisy Tourné Valdez; 17 March 1951; Montevideo, Uruguay
- Died: 19 November 2022 (aged 71)
- Occupations: Politician, teacher, syndicalist
- Political party: Broad Front
- Parent(s): María Obdulia Valdez; Pedro César Tourné

Daisy Tourné (17 March 1951 – 19 November 2022) was a Uruguayan politician, teacher, and syndicalist.

== Early life and career ==
Daisy Tourné was the daughter of María Obdulia Valdez and Pedro César Tourné, she was a niece to former Senator Uruguay Tourné, of the conservative National Party.

Tourné was an elementary school teacher and a social psychologist by profession.

Tourné aligned politically with the Frente Amplio movement, which was in government office between 2005 and 2020. Between 1995 and 2007 Tourné served as a deputy for Montevideo, prior to taking up ministerial office.

== Ministerial office ==
Between 2007 and June 2009 she served as Interior Minister in the government of President Tabaré Vázquez, the first woman to have been appointed to that post.

Tourné succeeded José Díaz in the post in 2007.

Tourné was herself succeeded in her post in 2009 firstly as a temporary measure by Víctor Rossi, and then by Jorge Bruni as a permanent appointment.

== Controversies ==
In 2007, as Interior Minister, Tourné oversaw security for the visit to Uruguay of US President George W. Bush, to whom a significant hostility among many of Tourné's Frente Amplio colleagues, raised in a tradition which magnifies Che Guevara and his Cuban fellow revolutionaries, was widely noted. This event occurred very shortly after her appointment to office.

In 2008 the opposition Colorado Party Presidential front runner Pedro Bordaberry Herrán called on Tourné to resign. Bordaberry's call followed his publicly expressed doubts about what he claimed was Tourné's lack of commitment to her ministerial responsibility for public safety issues. The criticism, which highlighted likely discourse during the 2009 Presidential elections, was rejected by Tourné.

=== Resignation from Frente Amplio government ===
However, Tourné eventually did resign on 4 June 2009. According to some reports, the President himself asked Tourné to resign from the Ministry following the incident, while these reports were contradicted by others.

The resignation occurred following some public gaffes, which included comments widely deemed indiscreet about former President Luis Alberto Lacalle. She also made a widely noted personal comment regarding former Vice President Luis Antonio Hierro López. This event came about 18 months after the Frente Amplio had disavowed another prominent member within its ranks for comparable comments made regarding the son of former President Lacalle.

==== Tourné and public debate on alleged 'crudeness' in political discourse ====
There followed a public debate on the supposed significance of 'crudeness', with some observers having regarded Ms. Tourné as having been unacceptably 'crude'.

In turn, the Uruguayan Socialist Party spokesman on the contrary accused the Opposition of 'crude machismo'. The party also offered an alternative version of the reason for Tourné's resignation, namely, that she had voluntarily left President Vázquez's government, countering suggestions that she had been dismissed.

== Personal life and death ==
Tourné died on 19 November 2022, at the age of 71.

== See also ==
- Politics of Uruguay
