= First Lady of Uruguay =

First Lady of the Oriental Republic of Uruguay
- Primera dama de la República Oriental del Uruguay
- Coat of arms of Uruguay
- Incumbent; Laura Alonsopérez since 1 March 2025
- Residence: Residencia de Suárez
- Inaugural holder: Bernardina Fragoso de Rivera
- Formation: November 6, 1830

First Lady of Uruguay (Spanish: Primera Dama de Uruguay) is the unofficial and protocol title of the wife of the president of Uruguay, and hostess of Suarez Residence. The first lady is not an elected position, carries no official duties and brings no salary, but is traditionally responsible for directing and coordinating activities in the social field of the presidency and also accompany the president in ceremonies or official activities.

The role is currently held by Laura Alonso Pérez, who is the spouse of president Yamandú Orsi.

== List of the first ladies of Uruguay ==
Portrait	Name	Tenure	President (Spouse)
	Bernardina Fragoso Laredo	1830-1834	Fructuoso Rivera; 1^{er} Constitutional President
	Juana Francisca Núñez Benites	1834-1835	Carlos Anaya
	Agustina Contucci Oribe	1835-1838	Manuel Oribe; 2^{do} Constitutional President
	Bernardina Fragoso Laredo	1838–1843	Fructuoso Rivera; 3^{er} Constitutional President
	María Josefa Álamo González	1843-1852	Joaquín Suárez
	María Dolores Maturana y Durán	1852-1853	Juan Francisco Giró; 4º Constitutional President
	Ana Micaela Monterroso y Bermúdez	1853-1854	Juan Antonio Lavalleja
	María García Zamora	1854-1855	Venancio Flores; 5º Constitutional President
	Luisa Carlota Bustamante del Puerto	1855-1856	Manuel Basilio Bustamante
	Francisca Javiera Pareja Beade	1856	José María Plá
	Dolores Vidal Villagrán	1856-1860	Gabriel Antonio Pereira; 6º Constitutional President
	Práxedes Rosa Bustamante del Puerto	1860-1864	Bernardo Prudencio Berro; 7º Constitutional President
	Rosario Carrasco Martínez	1864-1865	Atanasio Aguirre
		1865	Tomás Villalba
	María García Zamora	1865-1868	Venancio Flores
	Amalia Ordóñez Duval	1868-1872	Lorenzo Batlle; 8º Constitutional President
	Anastasia Villegas Castro	1872-1873	Tomás Gomensoro
		1873-1875	José Eugenio Ellauri; 9º Constitutional President
	Antonia Sayago Ribero	1875-1876	Pedro Varela; 10º Constitutional President
	Valentina Gómez de Aragón	1879-1880	Lorenzo Latorre; 11º Constitutional President
	Clemencia Estévez Elzaurdi	1880-1882	Francisco Antonino Vidal; 12° Constitutional President
	Teresa Mascaró y Sosa	1882-1886	Máximo Santos; 13° Constitutional President
	Clemencia Estévez Elzaurdi	1886	Francisco Antonino Vidal; 14° Constitutional President
	Ascensión Sáenz de la Peña Márquez	1886-1890	Máximo Tajes; 15º Constitutional President
	Elvira Reyes del Villar	1890-1894	Julio Herrera y Obes; 16° Constitutional President
	Delfina García Wich Vargas	1894	Duncan Stewart
	Matilde Baños Sánchez	1894–1897	Juan Idiarte Borda; 17° Constitutional President
	Ángela Fernández González	1899-1903	Juan Lindolfo Cuestas; 18º Constitutional President
	Matilde Irene Pacheco Stewart	1903–1907	José Batlle y Ordóñez; 19º Constitutional President
	Carmen Pastora Martínez Santos	1907–1911	Claudio Williman; 20° Constitutional President
	Matilde Irene Pacheco Stewart	1911-1915	José Batlle y Ordóñez; 21º Constitutional President
	María del Carmen Garino Sapello	1915-1919	Feliciano Viera; 22º Constitutional President
	Sara Narbondo	1919-1923	Baltasar Brum; 23º Constitutional President
	Josefina Perey Álvarez	1923-1927	José Serrato; 24º Constitutional President
	Aurelia Macció	1927-1931	Juan Campisteguy; 25º Constitutional President
	María Marcelina Ilarraz Miranda	1931-1938	Gabriel Terra; 26º Constitutional President
	Sara Terra Leivas	1938-1943	Alfredo Baldomir; 27º Constitutional President
	Celia Álvarez Mouliá	1943-1947	Juan José de Amézaga; 28° Constitutional President
	Juanita Etchemendy	1947	Tomás Berreta; 29º Constitutional President
	Matilde Ibáñez Tálice	1947-1951	Luis Batlle Berres; 30º Constitutional President
	María Aída Serra Serra	1951-1952	Andrés Martínez Trueba; 31º Constitutional President
	Elisa de los Campos	1967	Óscar Diego Gestido; 32° Constitutional President
	María Angélica Klein	1967-1972	Jorge Pacheco Areco; 33° Constitutional President
	Josefina Herrán Puig	1972-1976	Juan María Bordaberry; 34° Constitutional President
	Marta Canessa	1985-1990	Julio María Sanguinetti; 35° Constitutional President
	Julia Pou Brito del Pino	1990-1995	Luis Alberto Lacalle; 36° Constitutional President
	Marta Canessa Albareda	1995-2000	Julio María Sanguinetti; 37° Constitutional President
	Mercedes Menafra Rodríguez	2000-2005	Jorge Batlle; 38° Constitutional President
	María Auxiliadora Delgado	2005-2010	Tabaré Vázquez; 39° Constitutional President
	Lucía Topolansky Saavedra	2010-2015	José Mujica; 40° Constitutional President
	María Auxiliadora Delgado	2015–2019	Tabaré Vázquez; 41° Constitutional President
Vacant (2019–2020)			Tabaré Vázquez; 41° Constitutional President
	Lorena Ponce de León	2020-2024	Luis Alberto Lacalle Pou; 42° Constitutional President
Vacant (2024–2025)			Luis Alberto Lacalle Pou; 42° Constitutional President
	Laura Alonsopérez	2025-present	Yamandú Orsi; 43° Constitutional President

== Living former first ladies ==
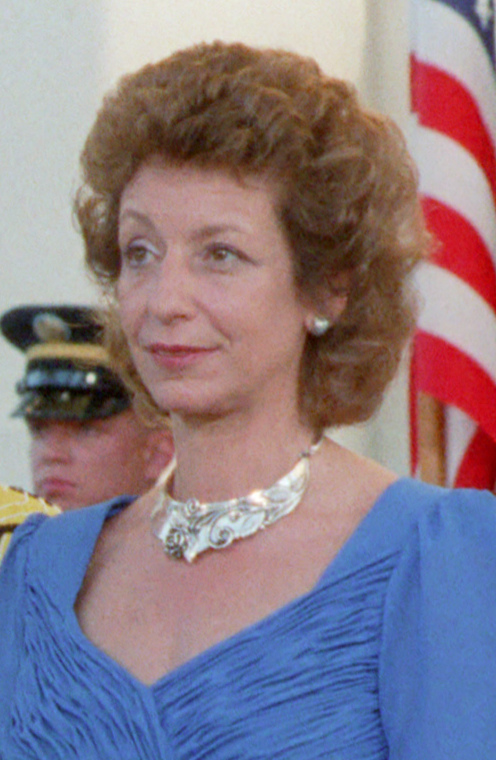
Marta Canessa,
served 1985–1990 & 1995–2000
December 16, 1936 (age 89)

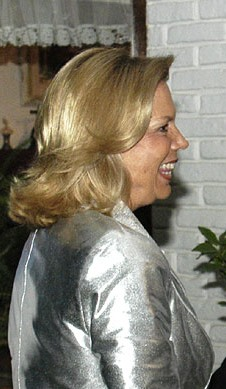
Julia Pou,
served 1990–1995
June 10, 1947 (age 79)

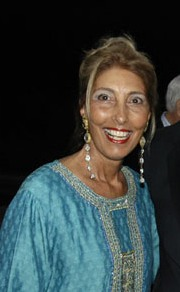
Mercedes Menafra,
served 2000–2005
June 20, 1943 (age 83)

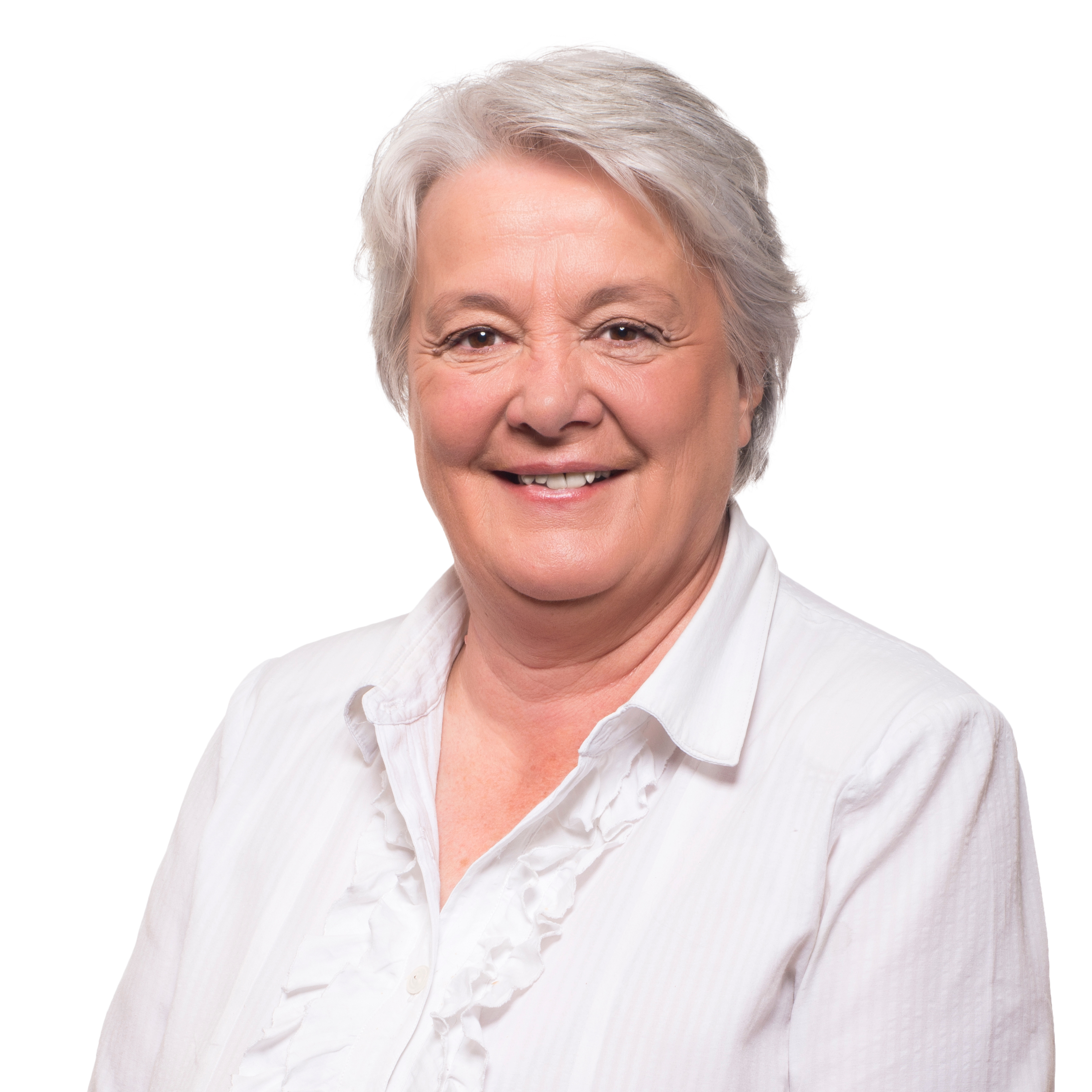
Lucía Topolansky,
served 2010–2015
September 25, 1944 (age 82)

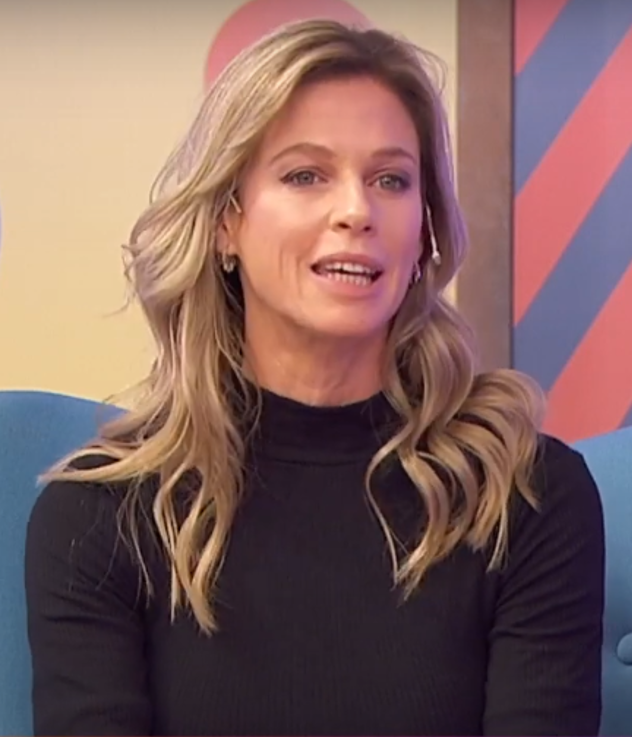
Lorena Ponce de León,
served 2020–2024
October 6, 1976 (age 50)
