= List of presidents of Uruguay =

Uruguay is a presidential republic in which the president is both the head of state and head of government. The following is a list of all the people who have held the office of President of Uruguay since 6 November 1830 (when the first constitution was adopted), with the exception of those who held the office of "President" under the National Council of Government, which served as the country's executive directory from 1955 to 1967. The first president of this list is Fructuoso Rivera, who held the office twice and once as part of the Triumvirate that ruled the country from 1853 to 1854.

Most of the presidents of Uruguay have belonged to the Colorado Party, a traditionally conservative party founded by Rivera in 1836, although there has not been a Colorado president since Jorge Batlle left office in 2005. The first free democratic elections for president were held in 1922. The current president is Yamandú Orsi of the Broad Front, who was elected in the 2024 presidential election.

== Governors of Uruguay as a province ==
=== Oriental Province (1814–1817) ===
The Province was a part of the United Provinces of the Río de la Plata, it was under the control of governors appointed by the government in Buenos Aires.

| No. | Portrait | Name (Birth–Death) | Took office | Left office | Duration | Notes |
|---|---|---|---|---|---|---|
| 1 | | Nicolás Rodríguez Peña (1775–1853) | 9 July 1814 | 25 August 1814 | 47 days | Appointed by Gervasio Antonio de Posadas, Supreme Director of the United Provinces of the Río de la Plata. |
| 2 | | Miguel Estanislao Soler (1783–1849) | 25 August 1814 | 10 January 1815 | 138 days | |
| 3 | | José Gervasio Artigas (1764–1850) | 10 January 1815 | 26 February 1815 | 47 days | Protector of the Federal League. |
| 4 | | Fernando Otorgués (1774–1831) | 26 February 1815 | July 1815 | 125 days | Appointed by José Gervasio Artigas. |
| 5 | | Miguel Barreiro (1789–1848) | July 1815 | 20 January 1817 | 1 year, 203 days | Appointed by José Gervasio Artigas. |

=== Cisplatine Province (1817–1828) ===
After the Portuguese conquest of the Banda Oriental, the Oriental Province became a province of the United Kingdom of Portugal, Brazil and the Algarves and a province of the Empire of Brazil after 1822.

| No. | Portrait | Name (Birth–Death) | Took office | Left office | Duration | Notes |
|---|---|---|---|---|---|---|
| 1 | | Carlos Frederico Lecor (1764–1836) | 20 January 1817 | 3 February 1826 | 9 years, 14 days | |
| 2 | | Francisco de Paula Maggessi (1769–1847) | 3 February 1826 | 27 August 1828 | 2 years, 206 days | |

=== Oriental Province (1825–1828) ===
In 1825, a group known as the Treinta y Tres Orientales began an insurrection against the Empire of Brazil. These revolutionaries assembled at the Congress of Florida in August 1825 and declared independence from the Empire of Brazil and reunited with the United Provinces of the Río de la Plata.

| No. | Portrait | Name (Birth–Death) | Took office | Left office | Duration | Notes |
|---|---|---|---|---|---|---|
| 1 | | Juan Antonio Lavalleja (1784–1853) | 19 September 1825 | 5 July 1826 | 289 days | Appointed by the Congress of Florida. |
| 2 | | Joaquín Suárez (1781–1868) | 5 July 1826 | 12 October 1827 | 1 year, 99 days | |
| 3 | | Luis Eduardo Pérez (1774–1841) | 12 October 1827 | 27 August 1828 | 320 days | Appointed by Juan Antonio Lavalleja. |

== Heads of state of Uruguay as an independent country ==
=== Government and Provisional General Captaincy of the Oriental State of Uruguay (1828–1830) ===
After the Preliminary Peace Convention the Oriental Province gained effective independence from the Empire of Brazil and the United Provinces of the Río de la Plata.

| No. | Portrait | Name (Birth–Death) | Took office | Left office | Duration | Notes |
|---|---|---|---|---|---|---|
| 1 | | Luis Eduardo Pérez (1774–1841) | 27 August 1828 | 1 December 1828 | 96 days | Governor and Provisional Captain General. Appointed by Juan Antonio Lavalleja. |
| 2 | | Joaquín Suárez (1781–1868) | 2 December 1828 | 22 December 1828 | 20 days | Governor and Provisional Captain General. Appointed by the General Constituent Assembly. |
| 3 | | José Rondeau (1775–1844) | 22 December 1828 | 17 April 1830 (Note: Resigned.) | 1 year, 116 days | Governor and Provisional Captain General. Appointed by the General Constituent Assembly. |
| 4 | | Juan Antonio Lavalleja (1784–1853) | 17 April 1830 | 28 June 1830 | 72 days | Governor and Provisional Captain General. Appointed by the General Constituent Assembly. |

=== Oriental State of Uruguay (1830–1919) ===
The Constitution of 1830 comes into force. The president was elected by the legislature for a four-year term.

| No. | Portrait | Name (Birth–Death) | Took office | Left office | Duration | Party | Elected | Notes |
|---|---|---|---|---|---|---|---|---|
| – | | Juan Antonio Lavalleja (1784–1853) | 28 June 1830 | 24 October 1830 | 118 days | — | — | Governor and Provisional Captain General. Appointed by the General Constituent Assembly. |
| – | | Luis Eduardo Pérez (1774–1841) | 24 October 1830 | 6 November 1830 | 13 days | — | — | President of the Senate exercising the Executive Power. |
| 1 | | Fructuoso Rivera (1784–1854) | 6 November 1830 | 24 October 1834 | 3 years, 352 days | — | 1830 | |
| – | | Carlos Anaya (1777–1862) | 24 October 1834 | 1 March 1835 | 128 days | Colorado | — | President of the Senate exercising the Executive Power. |
| 2 | | Manuel Oribe (1792–1857) | 1 March 1835 | 24 October 1838 | 3 years, 237 days | National | 1835 | |
| – | | Gabriel Antonio Pereira (1794–1861) | 24 October 1838 | 1 March 1839 | 128 days | Colorado | — | President of the Senate exercising the Executive Power. |
| 3 | | Fructuoso Rivera (1784–1854) | 1 March 1839 | 1 March 1843 | 4 years, 0 days | Colorado | 1839 | Second term. |
| – | | Manuel Oribe (1792–1857) | 16 February 1843 | 8 October 1851 | 8 years, 234 days | National | — | Second term. Self-proclaimed president of the Gobierno del Cerrito, during the Uruguayan Civil War. |
| – | | Joaquín Suárez (1781–1868) | 1 March 1843 | 15 February 1852 | 8 years, 351 days | Colorado | — | President of the Senate exercising the Executive Power. President of the Gobierno de la Defensa, during the Uruguayan Civil War. |
| – | | Bernardo Prudencio Berro (1803–1868) | 15 February 1852 | 1 March 1852 | 15 days | National | — | President of the Senate exercising the Executive Power. |
| 4 | | Juan Francisco Giró (1791–1863) | 1 March 1852 | 25 September 1853 (Note: Removed from Office.) | 1 year, 208 days | National | 1852 | Ousted from office by a coup d'état. |
| – | | Venancio Flores (1808–1868) | 25 September 1853 | 12 March 1854 | 168 days | Colorado | — | Triumvirate. |
| – | | Fructuoso Rivera (1784–1854) | 25 September 1853 | 13 January 1854 (Note: Died in office.) | 110 days | Colorado | — | Triumvirate. |
| – | | Juan Antonio Lavalleja (1784–1853) | 25 September 1853 | 22 October 1853 | 27 days | — | — | Triumvirate. |
| 5 | | Venancio Flores (1808–1868) | 12 March 1854 | 10 September 1855 | 1 year, 182 days | Colorado | 1854 | |
| – | | Luis María Lamas (1793–1864) | 29 August 1855 | 10 September 1855 | 12 days | Conservative | — | Self-proclaimed president after the Rebellion of the Conservatives. |
| – | | Manuel Basilio Bustamante (1785–1863) | 10 September 1855 | 15 February 1856 | 158 days | Colorado | — | President of the Senate exercising the Executive Power. |
| – | | José María Plá (1794–1869) | 15 February 1856 | 1 March 1856 | 15 days | Colorado | — | President of the Senate exercising the Executive Power. |
| 6 | | Gabriel Antonio Pereira (1794–1861) | 1 March 1856 | 1 March 1860 | 4 years, 0 days | Colorado | 1856 | |
| 7 | | Bernardo Prudencio Berro (1803–1868) | 1 March 1860 | 1 March 1864 | 4 years, 0 days | National | 1860 | |
| – | | Atanasio Cruz Aguirre (1801–1875) | 1 March 1864 | 15 February 1865 | 351 days | National | — | President of the Senate exercising the Executive Power. Resigned after the Brazilian invasion. |
| – | | Tomás Villalba (1805–1886) | 15 February 1865 | 20 February 1865 | 5 days | National | — | President of the Senate exercising the Executive Power. Resigned after the Brazilian invasion. |
| – | | Venancio Flores (1808–1868) | 20 February 1865 | 15 February 1868 | 2 years, 360 days | Colorado | — | De facto president after the Brazilian invasion. Assumed power as Provisional Governor. |
| – | | Pedro Varela (1837–1906) | 15 February 1868 | 1 March 1868 | 15 days | Colorado | — | President of the Senate exercising the Executive Power. |
| 8 | | Lorenzo Batlle (1810–1887) | 1 March 1868 | 1 March 1872 | 4 years, 0 days | Colorado | 1868 | |
| – | | Tomás Gomensoro Albín (1810–1900) | 1 March 1872 | 1 March 1873 | 1 year, 0 days | Colorado | — | President of the Senate exercising the Executive Power. |
| 9 | | José Eugenio Ellauri (1834–1894) | 1 March 1873 | 22 January 1875 | 1 year, 327 days | Colorado | 1873 | |
| 10 | | Pedro Varela (1837–1906) | 22 January 1875 | 10 March 1876 | 1 year, 48 days | Colorado | — | Ousted by a coup d'état. |
| – | | Lorenzo Latorre (1844–1916) | 10 March 1876 | 1 March 1879 | 4 years, 5 days | Colorado | — | Assumed power as Provisional Governor. |
| 11 | | Lorenzo Latorre (1844–1916) | 1 March 1879 | 15 March 1880 | 4 years, 5 days | Colorado | 1879 | |
| 12 | | Francisco Antonino Vidal (1825–1889) | 15 March 1880 | 1 March 1882 | 1 year, 351 days | Colorado | — | |
| 13 | | Máximo Santos (1847–1889) | 1 March 1882 | 1 March 1886 | 4 years, 0 days | Colorado | — | |
| 14 | | Francisco Antonino Vidal (1825–1889) | 1 March 1886 | 24 May 1886 | 84 days | Colorado | 1886 | |
| – | | Máximo Santos (1847–1889) | 24 May 1886 | 18 November 1886 | 178 days | Colorado | — | President of the Senate exercising the Executive Power. |
| 15 | | Máximo Tajes (1852–1912) | 18 November 1886 | 1 March 1890 | 3 years, 103 days | Colorado | — | |
| 16 | | Julio Herrera y Obes (1841–1912) | 1 March 1890 | 1 March 1894 | 4 years, 0 days | Colorado | 1890 | |
| – | | Duncan Stewart (1833–1923) | 1 March 1894 | 21 March 1894 | 20 days | Colorado | — | President of the Senate exercising the Executive Power. |
| 17 | | Juan Idiarte Borda (1844–1897) | 21 March 1894 | 25 August 1897 | 3 years, 157 days | Colorado | 1894 | Assassinated. |
| – | | Juan Lindolfo Cuestas (1837–1905) | 25 August 1897 | 10 February 1898 | 1 year, 174 days | Colorado | — | President of the Senate exercising the Executive Power. |
| – | | Juan Lindolfo Cuestas (1837–1905) | 10 February 1898 | 15 February 1899 | 1 year, 174 days | Colorado | — | De facto president following a self-coup. |
| – | | José Batlle y Ordóñez (1856–1929) | 15 February 1899 | 1 March 1899 | 14 days | Colorado | — | President of the Senate exercising the Executive Power. |
| 18 | | Juan Lindolfo Cuestas (1837–1905) | 1 March 1899 | 1 March 1903 | 4 years, 0 days | Colorado | 1899 | |
| 19 | | José Batlle y Ordóñez (1856–1929) | 1 March 1903 | 1 March 1907 | 4 years, 0 days | Colorado | 1903 | |
| 20 | | Claudio Williman (1861–1934) | 1 March 1907 | 1 March 1911 | 4 years, 0 days | Colorado | 1907 | |
| 21 | | José Batlle y Ordóñez (1856–1929) | 1 March 1911 | 1 March 1915 | 4 years, 0 days | Colorado | 1911 | Second term. |
| 22 | | Feliciano Viera (1872–1927) | 1 March 1915 | 1 March 1919 | 4 years, 0 days | Colorado | 1915 | |

=== Oriental Republic of Uruguay (1919–present) ===
==== National Council of Administration (1919–1933) ====
During his second term in office, President José Batlle y Ordóñez proposed constitutional changes to alter the structure of the executive branch to remove powers from an individual presidential figure in order to reduce the risk of that individual seeking dictatorial powers. While his initial proposals were not successful, a compromise resulted in the implementation of the Constitution of 1918. Under this colegiado system, the President shared powers with a bipartisan National Council of Administration who oversaw various bureaucratic organizations. The council was made up of nine members and was headed by its own president which was elected by the legislature in a role similar to that of a prime minister.

| No. | Portrait | Name (Birth–Death) | Took office | Left office | Duration | Party | Elected | Notes |
1918 Constitution (1918–1933)
| 23 | | Baltasar Brum (1883–1933) | 1 March 1919 | 1 March 1923 | 4 years, 0 days | Colorado | 1919 | Appointed by congress. The President served as part of the executive alongside the National Council of Administration, headed by a President: 1 March 1919 – 1 March 1921: Feliciano Viera; 1 March 1921 – 1 March 1923: José Batlle y Ordóñez |
| 24 | | José Serrato (1868–1960) | 1 March 1923 | 1 March 1927 | 4 years, 0 days | Colorado | 1922 | First popularly elected president. The President served as part of the executive alongside the National Council of Administration, headed by a President: 1 March 1923 – 1 March 1925: Julio María Sosa; 1 March 1925 – 1 March 1927: Luis Alberto de Herrera |
| 25 | | Juan Campisteguy (1859–1937) | 1 March 1927 | 1 March 1931 | 4 years, 0 days | Colorado | 1926 | The President served as part of the executive alongside the National Council of Administration, headed by a President: 1 March 1927 – 16 February 1928: José Batlle y Ordóñez; 6 February 1928 – 1 March 1929: Luis Caviglia; 1 March 1929 – 1 March 1931: Baltasar Brum |
| 26 | | Gabriel Terra (1873–1942) | 1 March 1931 | 31 March 1933 | 2 years, 30 days | Colorado | 1930 | The President served as part of the executive alongside the National Council of Administration, headed by a President: 1 March 1931 – 1 March 1933: Juan Pedro Fabini; 1 March 1933 – 31 March 1933: Antonio Rubio Pérez |

==== Unitary Executive (1933–1952) ====
During the Great Depression the colegiado system came under criticism for mishandling the economic situation in Uruguay. On 31 March 1933, President Gabriel Terra initiated a self-coup, dissolving the parliament and National Council of Administration, and began ruling by decree. There was widespread support for the coup amongst the political establishment and on 1 April a "March on Montevideo", inspired by Benito Mussolini and his March on Rome, was organized to give a show of popular support. Terra's Marzist government promulgated the 1934 Constitution, which replaced the colegiado system with a Council of Ministers (Consejo de Ministros) composed of the President and cabinet ministers which were jointly appointed by the President and the General Assembly. In 1942, Terra's successor Alfredo Baldomir was nearing the end of his term and initiated a military coup. He declared a national emergency and implemented a new constitution. The primary change of this constitution was the restructuring of the legislature.

| No. | Portrait | Name (Birth–Death) | Took office | Left office | Duration | Party | Election | Vice President | Notes |
Terrist Regime (1933–1942)
| – | | Gabriel Terra (1873–1942) | 31 March 1933 | 18 May 1934 | 5 years, 80 days | Colorado | — | — | De facto president following a self-coup. |
| – | | Gabriel Terra (1873–1942) | 18 May 1934 | 19 June 1938 | 5 years, 80 days | Colorado | — | Alfredo Navarro | Provisional president elected by the 3rd National Constituent Convention. |
| 27 | | Alfredo Baldomir (1884–1948) | 19 June 1938 | 21 February 1942 | 4 years, 255 days | Colorado | 1938 | César Charlone | |
| – | | Alfredo Baldomir (1884–1948) | 21 February 1942 | 1 March 1943 | 4 years, 255 days | Colorado | — | César Charlone | De facto president following a self-coup. |
1942 Constitution (1943–1952)
| 28 | | Juan José de Amézaga (1881–1956) | 1 March 1943 | 1 March 1947 | 4 years, 0 days | Colorado | 1942 | Alberto Guani | |
| 29 | | Tomás Berreta (1875–1947) | 1 March 1947 | 2 August 1947 | 154 days | Colorado | 1946 | Luis Batlle Berres | |
| 30 | | Luis Batlle Berres (1897–1964) | 2 August 1947 | 1 March 1951 | 3 years, 211 days | Colorado | — | Alfeo Brum | Vice-president under Berreta, assumed the presidency after his death. |
| 31 | | Andrés Martínez Trueba (1884–1959) | 1 March 1951 | 1 March 1952 | 1 year, 0 days | Colorado | 1950 | Alfeo Brum | The post of President was replaced by the National Council of Government. |

==== National Council of Government (1952–1967) ====
Beginning in 1951, a pact between the major political parties called for a referendum to replace the current constitution and return to a colegiado system. The reform was approved by referendum and in 1952 a new constituion was drafted which created the National Council of Government. This council, unlike the previous plural executive had no separately elected President, but instead consisted solely of nine-member council with six members from the largest political party and three from the second largest. The presidency of the council would rotate on an annual basis between the members of the majority party.

| No. | Government | Took office | Left office | Duration | Party | Election | Notes |
1952 Constitution (1952–1967)
| 1 | National Council of Government 1952–1955 | 1 March 1952 | 1 March 1955 | 3 years, 0 days | Colorado | — | The National Council of Government was headed by a President for the remaining of the 1951–1955 period: 1 March 1952 – 1 March 1955: Andrés Martínez Trueba |
| 2 | National Council of Government 1955–1959 | 1 March 1955 | 1 March 1959 | 4 years, 0 days | Colorado | 1954 | The National Council of Government was headed by a President rotating every year: 1 March 1955 – 1 March 1956: Luis Batlle Berres; 1 March 1956 – 1 March 1957: Alberto Fermín Zubiría; 1 March 1957 – 1 March 1958: Arturo Lezama; 1 March 1958 – 1 March 1959: Carlos Fischer |
| 3 | National Council of Government 1959–1963 | 1 March 1959 | 1 March 1963 | 4 years, 0 days | National | 1958 | The National Council of Government was headed by a President rotating every year: 1 March 1959 – 1 March 1960: Martín Echegoyen; 1 March 1960 – 1 March 1961: Benito Nardone; 1 March 1961 – 1 March 1962: Eduardo Víctor Haedo; 1 March 1962 – 1 March 1963: Faustino Harrison |
| 4 | National Council of Government 1963–67 | 1 March 1963 | 1 March 1967 | 4 years, 0 days | National | 1962 | The National Council of Government was headed by a President rotating every year: 1 March 1963 – 1 March 1964: Daniel Fernández Crespo; 1 March 1964 – 7 February 1965: Luis Giannattasio; 7 February 1965 – 1 March 1966: Washington Beltrán; 1 March 1966 – 1 March 1967: Alberto Héber Usher |

==== 1967 Constitution ====
The National Council of Government soon lost popular support due to its ineffective control over governmental ministers and lack of unity. A 1966 plebiscite supported the return to a Presidential system. The Constitution of 1967 provided for a strong one-person President who served for 5 years and is bared from immediate reelection.

Starting under the presidency of Jorge Pacheco Areco, the implementation of prompt security measures (medidas prontas de seguridad) led to an effectively permanent state of emergency which in 1973 ultimately resulted in the military staging a coup d'état. While the President remained in power, Uruguay's democratically elected Parliament was dismissed on 27 June 1973 for resisting the junta. A new military-controlled National Security Council (COSENA), which was inspired by the Brazilian military dictatorship, came into force and effectively suspended the constitution as overtime the military took control of more aspects of the state. The gradual shift from civilian to military control has led to this period being called the Civic-military dictatorship of Uruguay.

In 1984, a series of general strikes led to the return of democracy in Uruguay. The Naval Club Pact provided for the restoration of the 1967 constitution and the calling of new elections in exchange for blanket amnesty of military officials for the human rights violations which occurred during the dictatorship. On November 25, 1984, elections were held, and following the brief presidency of Rafael Addiego Bruno, on March 1, 1985, Colorado Party candidate Julio María Sanguinetti became the new president. The 1967 constitution has since been significantly amended numerous times, particularly regarding the process of conducting presidential elections, but the General Assembly officially still considers itself to be operating under the 1967 document.

| No. | Portrait | Name (Birth–Death) | Took office | Left office | Duration | Party | Election | Vice President | Notes |
1967 Constitution First period in force (1967–1973)
| 32 | | Óscar Diego Gestido (1901–1967) | 1 March 1967 | 6 December 1967 | 280 days | Colorado | 1966 | Jorge Pacheco Areco | |
| 33 | | Jorge Pacheco Areco (1920–1998) | 6 December 1967 | 1 March 1972 | 4 years, 86 days | Colorado | — | Alberto Abdala | Vice-president under Gestido, assumed the presidency after his death. |
| 34 | | Juan María Bordaberry (1928–2011) | 1 March 1972 | 27 June 1973 | 1 year, 118 days | Colorado | 1971 | Jorge Sapelli | |
Civic-military dictatorship (1973–1985)
| — | | Juan María Bordaberry (1928–2011) | 27 June 1973 | 12 June 1976 | 2 years, 351 days | Colorado | — | Vacant | 1973 coup d'état, start of the dictatorship between 1973 and 1985. Ousted from office. |
| — | | Alberto Demicheli (1896–1980) | 12 June 1976 | 1 September 1976 | 81 days | Colorado | — | Vacant | Appointed by the military. Ousted from office. |
| — | | Aparicio Méndez (1904–1988) | 1 September 1976 | 1 September 1981 | 5 years, 0 days | National | — | Vacant | Appointed by the military for a term of 5 years. |
| — | | Gregorio Álvarez (1925–2016) | 1 September 1981 | 12 February 1985 | 3 years, 164 days | Military | — | Vacant | Appointed by the military. |
| — | | Rafael Addiego (1923–2014) | 12 February 1985 | 1 March 1985 | 17 days | Civic Union | — | Vacant | President of the Supreme Court, appointed by the military. |
Democratic Restoration (1985–present)
| 35 | | Julio María Sanguinetti (born 1936) | 1 March 1985 | 1 March 1990 | 5 years, 0 days | Colorado | 1984 | Enrique Tarigo | First democratic President after the 1973–1985 dictatorship. |
| 36 | | Luis Alberto Lacalle (born 1941) | 1 March 1990 | 1 March 1995 | 5 years, 0 days | National | 1989 | Gonzalo Aguirre Ramírez | |
| 37 | | Julio María Sanguinetti (born 1936) | 1 March 1995 | 1 March 2000 | 5 years, 0 days | Colorado | 1994 | Hugo Batalla | Second term. |
| 37 | | Julio María Sanguinetti (born 1936) | 1 March 1995 | 1 March 2000 | 5 years, 0 days | Colorado | 1994 | Hugo Fernández Faingold | Second term. |
| 38 | | Jorge Batlle (1927–2016) | 1 March 2000 | 1 March 2005 | 5 years, 0 days | Colorado | 1999 | Luis Antonio Hierro López | |
| 39 | | Tabaré Vázquez (1940–2020) | 1 March 2005 | 1 March 2010 | 5 years, 0 days | Broad Front | 2004 | Rodolfo Nin Novoa | |
| 40 | | José Mujica (1935–2025) | 1 March 2010 | 1 March 2015 | 5 years, 0 days | Broad Front | 2009 | Danilo Astori | |
| 41 | | Tabaré Vázquez (1940–2020) | 1 March 2015 | 1 March 2020 | 5 years, 0 days | Broad Front | 2014 | Raúl Sendic Rodríguez | Second term. |
| 41 | | Tabaré Vázquez (1940–2020) | 1 March 2015 | 1 March 2020 | 5 years, 0 days | Broad Front | 2014 | Lucía Topolansky | Second term. |
| 42 | | Luis Lacalle Pou (born 1973) | 1 March 2020 | 1 March 2025 | 5 years, 0 days | National | 2019 | Beatriz Argimón | |
| 43 | | Yamandú Orsi (born 1967) | 1 March 2025 | Incumbent (Term ends on 1 March 2030) | 1 year, 253 days | Broad Front | 2024 | Carolina Cosse | |

== See also ==
- History of Uruguay
- Politics of Uruguay

== Bibliography ==
- Reyes Abadie, Washington; Vázquez Romero, Andrés (1986). Crónica general del Uruguay (in Spanish). Vol. 2. Montevideo: Ediciones de la Banda Oriental.
