= List of presidents of the Senate of Uruguay =

List of presidents of the Senate of Uruguay.

Below is a list of office-holders from 1830. From March 1, 1967 it is the Vice President of Uruguay who is the President of the Senate of Uruguay — although the office of Vice President of Uruguay was in abeyance from 1973 until 1985.

Name	Entered office	Left office	Party
Luis Eduardo Pérez	1830	1833	
Gabriel Antonio Pereira	1833	1834	
Carlos Anaya	1834	1835	
Gabriel Antonio Pereira	1836	1836	Colorado
Carlos Anaya	1837	1838	Colorado
Gabriel Antonio Pereira	1839	1839	Colorado
Luis Eduardo Pérez	1840	1840	Colorado
Joaquín Suárez	1841	1845	Colorado
Vacant (Guerra Grande)	1845	1851	
Bernardo Prudencio Berro	1852	1852	Blanco
Francisco Solano Antuña	1853	1853	Colorado
Alejandro Chucarro	1854	1854	Colorado
Manuel Basilio Bustamante	1855	1855	Colorado
José María Plá	1856	1856	Colorado
Florentino Castellanos	1857	1857	Colorado
Bernardo Prudencio Berro	1858	1859	Blanco
Florentino Castellanos	1860	1862	Colorado
Eduardo Acevedo Maturana	1863	1863	Blanco
Atanasio Cruz Aguirre	1864	1864	Blanco
Tomás Villalba	1865	1865	Blanco
Vacant	1866	1867	
Pedro Varela	1868	1868	Colorado
Alejandro Chucarro	1869	1869	Colorado
Francisco Antonino Vidal	1870	1870	Colorado
Tomás Gomensoro	1871	1872	Colorado
Pedro Varela	1873	1873	Colorado
Juan Domingo Piñeiro	1874	1874	Colorado
Pedro Carve	1875	1875	Colorado
Juan Margariños Cervantes	1876	1876	Colorado
-	1877	1878	
Francisco Antonino Vidal	1879	1879	Colorado
Alejandro Chucarro	1880	1881	Colorado
Alberto Flangini	1882	1882	Colorado
Miguel González Rodríguez	1883	1884	Colorado
Pedro Carve	1885	1885	Colorado
Javier Laviña	1886	1886	Colorado
Máximo Santos	1886	1886	Colorado
Fernando Torres	1887	1889	Colorado
Agustín de Castro	1890	1890	Colorado
Duncan Stewart	1891	1891	Colorado
Tomás Gomensoro	1892	1893	Colorado
Duncan Stewart	1894	1894	Colorado
Eduardo Chucarro	1895	1896	Colorado
Juan Lindolfo Cuestas	1897	1897	Colorado
Carlos de Castro	1898	1898	Colorado
José Batlle y Ordóñez	1899	1900	Colorado
Juan Carlos Blanco Fernández	1901	1902	Colorado
José Batlle y Ordóñez	1903	1903	Colorado
Juan P. Castro	1904	1904	Colorado
Juan Campisteguy	1905	1905	Colorado
Francisco Soca	1906	1906	Colorado
Feliciano Viera	1907	1912	Colorado
Manuel Otero	1913	1913	Colorado
Blas Vidal (hijo)	1914	1914	Colorado
Ricardo Areco	1915	1918	Colorado
José Espalter	1919	1924	Colorado
Duvimioso Terra	1925	1928	Colorado
Ismael Cortinas	1929	1929	Blanco
Carlos María Morales	1929	1929	Blanco
Juan Bautista Morelli	1930	1931	Blanco
Juan Andrés Ramírez Chain	1932	1932	Blanco
Salvador Estradé	1933	1933	Colorado
Alfredo Navarro	1934	1937	Colorado
Augusto C. Bado	1938	1941	Colorado
Tomás Berreta	1943	1943	Colorado
Alberto Guani	1943	1947	Colorado
Alfeo Brum	1947	1947	Colorado
Luis Batlle Berres	1947	1947	Colorado
César Charlone	1947	1948	Colorado
César Mayo Gutiérrez	1948	1950	Colorado
Eduardo Blanco Acevedo	1950	1950	Colorado
Antonio Rubio	1951	1951	Colorado
Alfeo Brum	1951	1952	Colorado
Juan Francisco Guichón	1952	1952	Colorado
Alfeo Brum	1952	1955	Colorado
Ledo Arroyo Torres	March 1, 1955	March 1, 1959	Colorado
Juan Carlos Raffo Frávega	March 1, 1959	March 1, 1963	Blanco
Martín R. Echegoyen	March 1, 1963	March 1, 1967	Blanco
Jorge Pacheco Areco	March 1, 1967	December 6, 1967	Colorado
Alberto Abdala	December 6, 1967	March 1, 1972	Colorado
Jorge Sapelli	March 1, 1972	June 27, 1973	Colorado
Enrique Tarigo	March 1, 1985	March 1, 1990	Colorado
Gonzalo Aguirre Ramírez	March 1, 1990	March 1, 1995	Blanco
Hugo Batalla	March 1, 1995	October 3, 1998	Colorado
Hugo Fernández Faingold	October 1998	March 1, 2000	Colorado
Luis Antonio Hierro López	March 1, 2000	March 1, 2005	Colorado
Rodolfo Nin Novoa	March 1, 2005	March 1, 2010	Frente Amplio
Danilo Astori	March 1, 2010	March 1, 2015	Frente Amplio
Raúl Fernando Sendic	March 1, 2015	September 13, 2017	Frente Amplio
Lucía Topolansky	September 13, 2017	March 1, 2020	Frente Amplio
Beatriz Argimón	March 1, 2020	March 1, 2025	Blanco
Carolina Cosse	March 1, 2025	Incumbent	Broad Front
