= Batlle family =

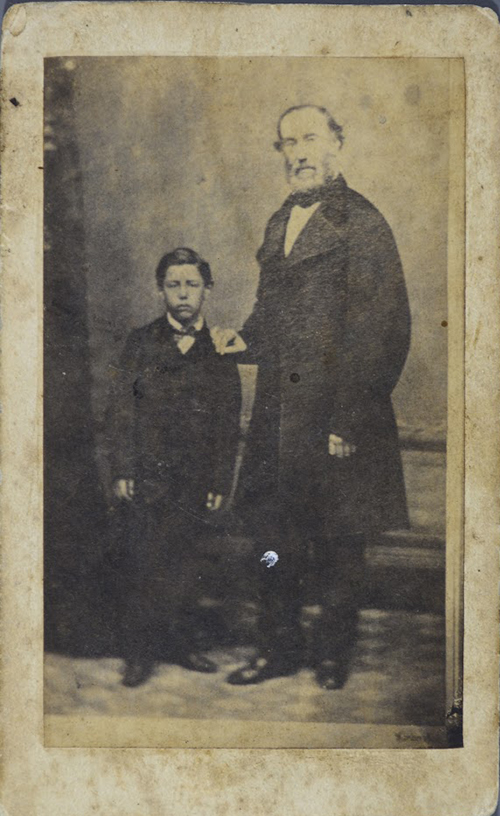
- Lorenzo Batlle y Grau and his son, José Batlle y Ordóñez in the 1860s.
- Current region: Montevideo, Uruguay
- Origin: Sitges, Catalonia, Spain
- Founded: 1800, Montevideo; 226 years ago
- Founder: Josep Batlle i Carreó
- Titles: List: President of Uruguay; Vice President of Uruguay; Senator of the Republic; National Representative; National Government Councilor

The Batlle family is a prominent Uruguayan political family. In addition to different government positions, four members of the family have served as President of Uruguay between the 19th and 21st centuries. The family is associated with the Colorado Party, giving its name to one of its main factions, Batllism.

== History ==
The Batlle family originated in the town of Sitges, Catalonia, Spain. The Uruguayan family branch is descended from Josep Batlle i Carreó, who migrated from Sitges to Montevideo in 1800. In Uruguay he set up a mill and became a flour and wheat merchant, and during the emancipation struggles of the Viceroyalty of the Río de la Plata, he participated in the defense of Montevideo from the English invasion, in support of the metropolis.

Batlle i Carréo had three wives and nine children throughout his life. In 1814, he went into exile with his children, when the Spanish withdrew from Montevideo and his property was confiscated. They settled in Barcelona but in 1833 the family returned to Montevideo, capital of Uruguay, which had been proclaimed an independent state three years earlier.

Lorenzo Batlle y Grau —son of Josep Batlle i Carréo and his wife Gertrudis Grau i Font— studied in Spain and France during his family's exile, and upon his return to Uruguay he joined the Colorado Party and served in the Gobierno de la Defensa during the Uruguayan Civil War under the command of Giuseppe Garibaldi. After the war he entered politics, holding different government positions. In 1868 he took office as president, being the first member of the family to do so.

Lorenzo Batlle y Grau and his wife Amalia Ordóñez Duval had two sons, José Batlle y Ordóñez and Luis Batlle y Ordóñez. The eldest of the brothers, José was a journalist and politician who served as president in two terms, carrying out important social and labor reforms, such as the separation of Church and State, the introduction of universal suffrage and the eight-hour workday, as well as free high school education, and divorce. He developed Batllism, an ideology that defends state control of the basic aspects of the economy through monopoly, in addition to the sanction of social laws.

José Batlle y Ordóñez was married to Matilde Pacheco, with whom he had five children: César (1885–1966), Rafael (1887–1960), Amalia Ana (1892–?), Ana Amalia (1894–?) and Lorenzo (1897–1954). They held different positions such as Senators and National Representatives or as journalists in the family newspaper, El Día. His nephew, Luis Batlle Berres —son of Luis Batlle y Ordóñez and his wife Petrona Berres y Mc Intyre, of Irish descent—, whom he raised since the death of his brother, had a more successful political career, since in the 1946 elections he was elected Vice President and in August 1947 he took office as president after the death of Tomás Berreta.

Luis Batlle Berres had three children with Matilde Ibáñez Tálice: Jorge Luis (1927–2016), Luis César (1930–2016) and Matilde Linda (born 1932). Jorge Luis served as president from 2000 to 2005, being the fourth member of the family to hold the position, descending in a direct line from Josep Batlle y Carrió.

== Members ==
- Josep Batlle i Carreó (1773–1854), father of Lorenzo Batlle y Grau
  - Lorenzo Batlle y Grau (1810–1887), son of Josep Batlle i Carreó; 8th president of Uruguay
    - José Batlle y Ordoñez (1856–1929), Lorenzo Batlle y Grau's eldest son; 19th and 21st president of Uruguay; married to Matilde Pacheco
      - César Batlle Pacheco (1885–1966),
      - Rafael Batlle Pacheco (1887–1960)
      - Amalia Ana Batlle Pacheco (1892–1894)
      - Ana Amalia Batlle Pacheco (1894–1913)
      - Lorenzo Batlle Pacheco (1897–1954).
    - Luis Batlle y Ordóñez (1861–1908), married to Petrona Berres y Mc Intyre
      - Luis Batlle Berres (1897–1964), 30th president of Uruguay and (earlier) 4th Vice President; married to Matilde Ibáñez Tálice
        - Jorge Batlle Ibáñez (1927–2016), 38th president of Uruguay and (earlier) Senator of the Republic and National Representative
          - Raúl Lorenzo Batlle Lamuraglia, son of Jorge Batlle Ibáñez and his first wife, Noemí Lamuraglia, financier and Senator of the Republic since 2021; married to Helena Morador
            - Lorenzo Batlle Morador
            - Gerónimo Batlle Morador
          - Beatriz Batlle Lamuraglia, daughter of Jorge Batlle Ibáñez, psychologist
            - Nicolás (born 1992)
            - María Paz (born 2001)
        - Luis César Batlle Ibáñez, pianist, professor of music (1930–2016)
        - Matilde Linda (born 1932)
