= Duncan Stewart (Uruguayan politician) =

Uruguayan politician (1833–1923)

Duncan Antonio Stewart Agell
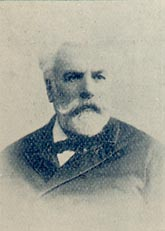

President of Uruguay
- Interim
- In office March 1, 1894 – March 21, 1894
- Preceded by: Julio Herrera y Obes
- Succeeded by: Juan Idiarte Borda

37th President of the Senate
- In office 1891–1891
- Preceded by: Agustín de Castro
- Succeeded by: Tomás Gomensoro Albín

Personal details
- Born: January 2, 1833 Buenos Aires, Argentine Confederation
- Died: October 13, 1923 (aged 90) Montevideo, Uruguay
- Party: Colorado
- Spouse: Delfina García Vargas
- Children: 8

Duncan Antonio Stewart Agell (2 January 1833 – 13 October 1923), was a Uruguayan president of Scottish Argentine origin. He served as interim President of Uruguay for a brief time in 1894.

== Family background ==
He was the son of a marriage between Scotsman Duncan Stewart (of Acharn) and Uruguayan Dorotea Agell. Little is known about his life, but it is known he was born in Buenos Aires, Argentina in 1833. His niece Matilde Pacheco married José Batlle y Ordóñez, who was later to become a long-serving Uruguayan President. His grand-nephews César Batlle Pacheco and Lorenzo Batlle Pacheco each served as a Deputy and Senator, and Rafael Batlle Pacheco was a notable journalist.

== Early political career ==
Later he moved to Uruguay, where he worked as a civil servant and later as a politician. He served as the Minister of Finance in the administration of Lorenzo Batlle from 1869 to 1872. In 1890 he was elected Senator. He served as the President of the Senate of Uruguay in 1891 and 1894.

He was a member of the Colorado Party (Uruguay).

== President of Uruguay (interim) ==
The presidential election of 1894 resulted in a political crisis. For twenty-one days (between March 1 and March 21) none of the candidates received the necessary 45 votes to become president. During this time, Stewart, president of the Senate, exercised power as President of Uruguay.

Finally, Stewart ceded the office to Juan Idiarte Borda who won the presidency with 47 votes, but who was to be assassinated while President.

== Post-Presidency ==
He served as the President of the Chamber of Deputies of Uruguay in 1896. Later, Stewart opposed the grab of power by Juan Lindolfo Cuestas and was not active in politics from that time.

He married Delfina García Vargas and had eight children with her. Duncan Stewart died in 1923, having lived through practically all of Uruguay's post-independence history.

== See also ==
- Politics of Uruguay
- List of political families#Uruguay
- Colorado Party (Uruguay)#Earlier History

Political offices
Preceded by Julio Herrera y Obes	President of Uruguay; Acting; 1894	Succeeded by Juan Idiarte Borda
