= Lorena Ponce de León =

Uruguayan landscape architect (born 1976)

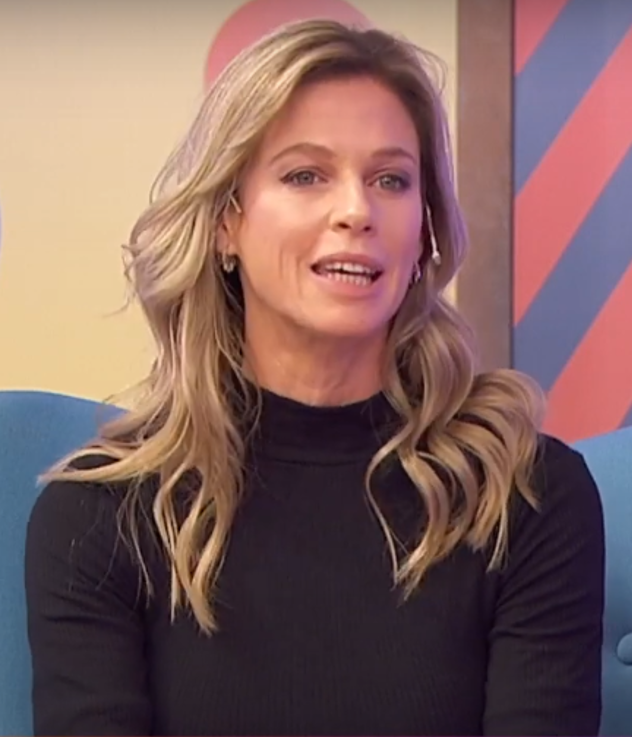
- Ponce de León in 2021

First Lady of Uruguay
- In role 1 March 2020 – 17 June 2024; Suspended: 22 May 2022 – 17 June 2024
- President: Luis Lacalle Pou
- Preceded by: María Auxiliadora Delgado (2019)
- Succeeded by: Laura Alonso Pérez (2025)

Personal details
- Born: Lorena Ponce de León Núñez; 6 October 1976 (age 49) Montevideo, Uruguay
- Party: National Party
- Spouse: Luis Lacalle Pou (m. 2000; div. 2024)
- Children: 3

Lorena Ponce de León Núñez (born 6 October 1976). She was the wife of Luis Lacalle Pou, who served as the 42nd president of Uruguay.

== Early life and education ==
She was born on 6 October 1976 in Montevideo, as the daughter of a Batllist mother and a father with little connection to politics. She was raised in La Blanqueada, Montevideo, where she lived until being 9 years old, and then she moved with her parents to Carrasco. She attended the German School and the Scuola Italiana.

She graduated from Faculty of Agricultural Sciences of the Universidad de la Empresa with a Forest Technician degree. She also studied at the Professor Julio Muñoz School of Gardening. She graduated from the Faculty of Agricultural Sciences of the Universidad de la Empresa as a Forestry Technician and studied at the School of Gardening Prof. Julio E. Muñoz.

== Jobs in Uruguay ==
=== Sembrando Program ===
In March 2020, she launched Sembrando, a program that aims to support entrepreneurs after the health crisis caused by the coronavirus pandemic. The program makes it possible to consult with experts in the area and helps to connect entrepreneurs with institutions related to the topic of their entrepreneurship. She herself reported on April 7 that 1,460 people had signed up.

== Personal life ==
Ponce de León is a hockey player. In November 1989, Ponce de León met with Luis Lacalle Pou at a youth gathering to celebrate the victory of Lacalle Pou's father Luis Lacalle Herrera as President of Uruguay. Ten years later, they met again and began dating. They were married in 2000, in a service conducted by Daniel Sturla in the Montevideo Metropolitan Cathedral. Together, they have three children: Luis Alberto, Violeta and Manuel. Luis and Violeta are the first twins born by IVF in Uruguay.

On 6 May 2022, she announced the separation from her husband. The couple divorced in June 2024.
