= Luis Lacalle =

Luis Lacalle may refer to:

- Luis Alberto Lacalle, president of Uruguay 1990–1995
- Luis Lacalle Pou, president of Uruguay 2020–2025
