= Pedro Carve =

Uruguayan politician

Head of State of Uruguay
- In office January 22, 1875 – January 22, 1875
- Preceded by: Pedro Varela
- Succeeded by: Pedro Varela

Personal details
- Party: Colorado Party

Pedro Esteban Carve Pérez was a Uruguayan politician who served as the President of the Senate and who became the head of state of Uruguay for one single day on January 22, 1875. He served as the President of the Senate of Uruguay in 1875 and in 1885. He served as the President of the Chamber of Deputies in 1876.

Political offices
Preceded by Pedro Varela	President of Uruguay; 1875	Succeeded by Pedro Varela
