= Gabriel Antonio Pereira =

Uruguayan politician

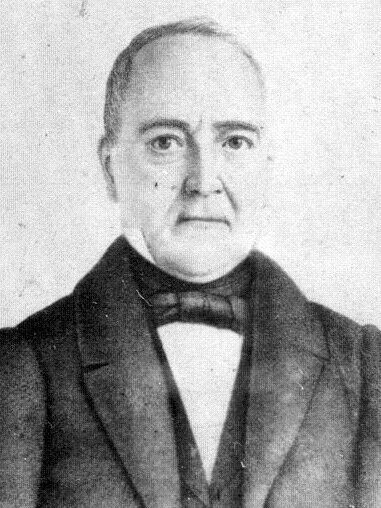

President of Uruguay
- In office 24 October 1838 – 1 March 1839
- Preceded by: Manuel Oribe
- Succeeded by: Fructuoso Rivera
- In office 1 March 1856 – 1 March 1860
- Preceded by: Manuel Basilio Bustamante
- Succeeded by: Bernardo Berro

Personal details
- Born: 17 March 1794 Montevideo, Uruguay
- Died: 14 April 1861 (aged 67) Montevideo, Uruguay
- Political party: Colorado Party

Gabriel Antonio José Pereira Villagrán (Montevideo, 17 March 1794 – 14 April 1861) was a Uruguayan politician who served as president first from 1838 to 1839, and again from 1856 to 1860.

He was Minister of Finance from 1830 to 1831. He served as the President of the Senate of Uruguay 1833–1834, 1836 and 1839.

Political offices
Preceded by Manuel Oribe	President of Uruguay; 1838–1839	Succeeded by Fructuoso Rivera
Preceded by José María Plá	President of Uruguay; 1856–1860	Succeeded by Bernardo Berro
