= María de Montserrat =

Uruguayan writer who was a member of Generación del 45

- Born: August 4, 1913; Camagüey, Cuba
- Died: August 23, 1995 (aged 82); Montevideo, Uruguay
- Occupation: writer
- Children: Marta Canessa

María de Montserrat Albareda (August 4, 1913 – August 23, 1995) was a Uruguayan writer who was a member of Generación del 45.

== Biography ==
Together with Paulina Medeiros, Armonía Somers, Clara Silva and Selva Márquez, Montserrat was one of the most important female voices of what Emir Rodríguez Monegal called Narrativa Uruguaya of the Middle Century.

She was born in Camagüey, Cuba, but her parents settled in Uruguay two years later. At age 17, she published Arriates en flor, a book of poems where some influence of Juana de Ibarbourou can be discovered but where most shone was in the very short story. Among this production is the story "Portrait in pencil" that the critic Ruben Cotelo selected for his anthology "Uruguayan Narrators". There, Cotelo says: "she has tried to pick up a Montevideo that is leaving and some Montevidean that disappear" in reference to the sensitivity of the author to unravel "the thick tangle of relationships that binds the family group within the upper middle class, some in decadence".

In 1951 a theatrical her work, Intermitencias, directed by Margarita Xirgu was released.

Between February 24, 1976 and until the date of her death, she occupied the chair "Bartolomé Hidalgo" at the Academia Nacional de Letras.

In 1999, in Volume No. 174 of his "Collection of Uruguayan Classics", the Biblioteca Artigas has published El País Secreto, written in 1977. Montserrat was awarded the Candelabro Gold Award by the B'nai B'rith Uruguay. She was the mother of the historian Marta Canessa, the former First Lady of Uruguay and wife of the Uruguayan former president Julio María Sanguinetti.

== Works ==
=== Poem ===
- Arriates en flor (1932)

=== Short stories ===
- Tres relatos (1942)
- Cuentos mínimos (1953)
- Con motivo de vivir (Editorial Alfa, Montevideo, 1962)
- Los lugares (Editorial Alfa, 1965)
- El sonido blanco y otros cuentos (Ediciones del Aleph, 1979)
- Los juegos (Ediciones de la Banda Oriental, Montevideo, 1993)

=== Novels ===
- Los habitantes (Editorial Alfa, 1968)
- La casa quinta (Ediciones de la Banda Oriental)
- El País Secreto (Colección de Clásicos Uruguayos, Biblioteca Artigas, Montevideo, 1999)

=== Theatre ===
- Intermitencias (1951)
