= César Batlle Pacheco =

Uruguayan politician

César Batlle Pacheco (30 August 1885 – 5 June 1966) was a Uruguayan journalist and political figure.

== Biography ==
Batlle was born in Montevideo into the distinguished Batlle family, the eldest son of Matilde Pacheco and José Batlle y Ordóñez, the three-time President of Uruguay (1899, 1903–07 and 1911–15). His brothers were Rafael and Lorenzo Batlle Pacheco. He was of Catalan descent. He and his brothers grew up with his orphaned cousin, future Uruguayan president Luis Batlle Berres, on the Piedras Blancas estate outside Montevideo.

He was a journalist by profession and a prominent member of the Uruguayan Colorado Party, closely associated with El Día, the newspaper founded by his father.

In 1919, he served as president of Club Atlético Peñarol. In 1931, and between 1943 and 1952, he served as president of the Uruguayan Football Association

== Political elections ==
He was elected a Deputy in 1951. From 1959 till 1963, he served as a minority member in the National Council of Government (Uruguay). He became a Senator in 1964. He died in Montevideo in 1966.

== See also ==
- Politics of Uruguay
- List of political families#Uruguay

Preceded by Raúl Jude	Uruguayan Football Association; 1931	Succeeded by Mario Ponce De León
Preceded by Cyro Geanbruno	Uruguayan Football Association; 1943–1952	Succeeded by Miguel Ángel Cattaneo
