= Julia Pou =

Uruguayan politician

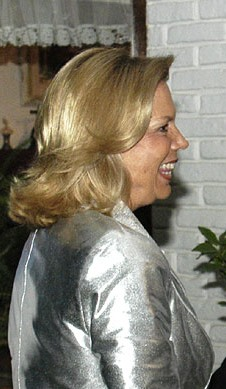
- Pou in 2008

Senator of Uruguay
- In office 2000–2005

First Lady of Uruguay
- In office March 1, 1990 – March 1, 1995
- President: Luis Alberto Lacalle
- Preceded by: Marta Canessa
- Succeeded by: Marta Canessa

Personal details
- Born: María Julia Pou Brito del Pino; 10 June 1947 (age 78) Montevideo, Uruguay
- Party: National Party
- Spouse: Luis Alberto Lacalle (m. 1970)
- Children: 4, including Luis Lacalle Pou

María Julia Pou Brito del Pino (born June 10, 1947), popularly known as Julita, is a Uruguayan politician and member of the National Party (Uruguay) (PN). Pou served in the Senate of Uruguay 2000 to 2005, as well as First Lady of Uruguay from 1990 until 1995. She is the wife of former President Luis Alberto Lacalle and the mother of President Luis Alberto Lacalle Pou, who took office on 1 March 2020.

== Biography ==
Pou was born in Montevideo to Alejandro Pou de Santiago, a physician, and María Eloísa Julia Brito del Pino Bordoni. She has two brothers, Gonzalo and Alejandro. She studied at the University of Paris, but did not graduate. Pou married Luis Alberto Lacalle in 1970. The couple have three children - Pilar, Luis Alberto, Juan José Manuel.

During her tenure as first lady, Pou founded Acción Solidaria, a charitable non-governmental organization, which she headed until 1997.

Together with Beatriz Argimón, Pou founded the Acción Comunitaria group (Lista 400) and was elected to the Senate of Uruguay in the 1999 general election. She served as a Senator from 2000 until 2005.

== Bibliography ==
- Vierci, Pablo (2015). Ellas 5. Montevideo: Aguaclara. ISBN 9789974994232.
