= Juan Idiarte Borda =

Uruguayan politician

Juan Bautista Idiarte Borda y Soumastre
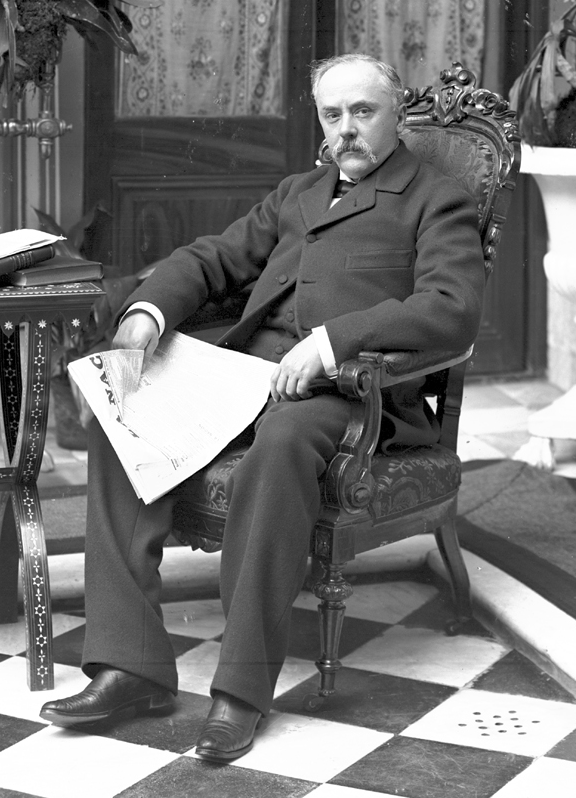

17th President of Uruguay
- In office March 21, 1894 – August 25, 1897
- Preceded by: Duncan Stewart
- Succeeded by: Juan Lindolfo Cuestas

Personal details
- Born: April 20, 1844
- Died: August 25, 1897 (aged 53)
- Party: Colorado Party
- Spouse: Matilde Baños
- Children: Celia, María Esther

Juan Bautista Idiarte Borda y Soumastre (April 20, 1844 – August 25, 1897) was the 17th President of Uruguay. He is the only Uruguayan president to be assassinated in office.

== Background ==
Originating from the Uruguayan department of Soriano, which he was to represent in Uruguay's chamber of deputies, Idiarte was a member of the Colorado Party, which dominated the country's politics for many years.

== President of Uruguay ==
On March 21, 1894 Duncan Stewart, interim President of Uruguay stepped down, and Idiarte replaced him in that office.

=== Strife on various fronts ===
Idiarte's presidency was beset by a number of severe difficulties which found their origins in a host of commercial, ideological and personality issues, in the background of Uruguay's intermittent Civil War. In addition, the nature of the ruling Colorado Party of the period was seen as particularly fractious.

=== Public works ===
Idiarte's term of office, however, was also characterized by a program of public works. This included the development of the Port of Montevideo and the establishment of a national Bank.

=== Social welfare ===
Law 2408 of 1895, for instance, established the National Hygiene Council, also dependent on the Ministry of Government, with fundamentally regulatory and control functions. Additionally, it was responsible for 18 Departmental Councils, which took the presence of the health authority to every corner of the country.

In 1896, social security protection for teachers was introduced, with the establishment of a teachers’ pension and retirement fund.

== Assassination ==
On August 25, 1897, Idiarte was assassinated by Avelino Arredondo with a revolver, who had been erroneously identified several months earlier (in El Día, edited by José Batlle y Ordóñez) as a would-be assassin during a previous incident. While Idiarte's family warned him of an assassination plot on the part of his party enemies, and although the assassin was a known strong supporter of Batlle, the latter successfully maintained a plausible deniability in connection with the crime, the only instance to date of a presidential assassination in the history of Uruguay.

Subsequently, the reputation of Idiarte was greatly overshadowed by that of José Batlle y Ordóñez, who later became a long-serving President.

== See also ==
- Politics of Uruguay

Political offices
Preceded by Duncan Stewart	President of Uruguay; 1894–1897	Succeeded by Juan Lindolfo Cuestas
