= Marta Canessa =

Uruguayan historian (born 1936)

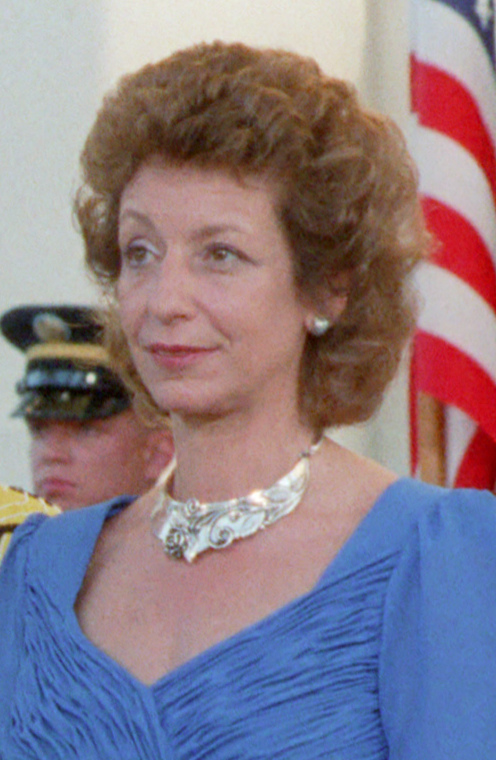
- Canessa in 1986

First Lady of Uruguay
- In office March 1, 1995 – March 1, 2000
- President: Julio María Sanguinetti
- Preceded by: Julia Pou
- Succeeded by: Mercedes Menafra
- In office March 1, 1985 – March 1, 1990
- President: Julio María Sanguinetti
- Preceded by: Alicia Rey Nebril
- Succeeded by: Julia Pou

Personal details
- Born: December 16, 1936 (age 89) Montevideo, Uruguay
- Spouse: Julio María Sanguinetti
- Children: Julio Luis; Emma
- Parent: María de Montserrat (mother)
- Occupation: Historian; Academic; Journalist; Writer

Marta Canessa de Monserrat (born December 16, 1936 Montevideo) is a Uruguayan historian, academic and writer. Canessa, the wife of former President Julio María Sanguinetti, served as the First Lady of Uruguay for two non-consecutive terms - 1985 to 1990 and 1995 until 2000.

== Biography ==
Canessa was member of the Commission special permanent of the old city in Montevideo during 15 years. Also was member of the Council honorary of the works of preservation and reconstruction of Colonia del Sacramento, which was later declared heritage of the humanity by Unesco.

== Personal life ==
She is the daughter of María de Montserrat, a writer.

== Selected works ==
- Rivera: un Oriental Liso y Llano (Ediciones de la Banda Oriental, Montevideo. 1976)
- Ciudad Vieja de Montevideo
- El Bien Nacer. Limpieza de Oficios y Limpieza de Sangre. Raíces Ibéricas de un Mal Latinoamericano. Montevideo, Alfaguara, 2000.

== Bibliography ==
- Vierci, Pablo (2015). Ellas 5. Montevideo: Aguaclara. ISBN 9789974994232.
