= Mercedes Menafra =

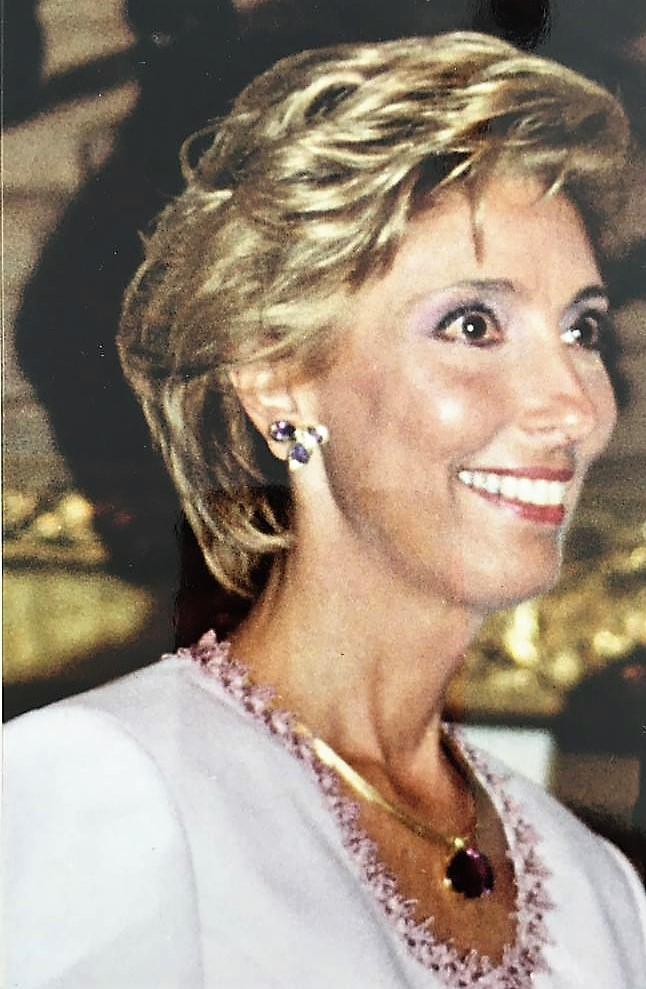

First Lady of Uruguay
- In office March 1, 2000 – March 1, 2005
- President: Jorge Batlle
- Preceded by: Marta Canessa
- Succeeded by: María Auxiliadora Delgado

Personal details
- Born: María de las Mercedes Menafra Rodríguez; 20 June 1943 (age 83) Montevideo, Uruguay
- Spouse: Jorge Batlle (1989–2016)
- Children: María Paula
- Education: University of the Republic
- Occupation: Politician, entrepreneur

María de las Mercedes Menafra Rodríguez (born 20 June 1943) is a Uruguayan entrepreneur, who served as the First Lady of Uruguay from 2000 to 2005, as the wife of President Jorge Batlle. She is the president of the organization Todos por Uruguay.

== Biography ==
Mercedes Menafra's father was a pharmaceutical chemist, in charge of the Menafra pharmacy chain in Punta del Este, which is currently owned by the family. Her mother Mercedes was also a pharmaceutical chemist, and worked as an academic of the University of the Republic's Faculty of Chemistry.

Mercedes attended the Colegio Nacional José Pedro Varela for elementary and secondary school. She graduated with a bachelor's degree in law and entered the Faculty of Law and Social Sciences at the University of the Republic. She speaks English, French, and Italian. Her daughter María Paula was born out of her first marriage.

In 1977 she founded her own export company in the hand-woven industry, and in 1989 she married Jorge Batlle.

At that time Batlle was a Senator of the Republic, and ten years later would become President of the same. In 1995 Menafra was elected president of the Casa de Gardel center for rehabilitation and recreation of people with disabilities, where she worked until 2000.

Menafra meeting with Miami-Dade County Mayor Alex Penelas while on a September 2000 visit to the United States

In 1999, she received the Artigas Award for Uruguayan Women for her work in pursuit of the recognition of women. In 2000, the Award for Women Entrepreneurs was presented to her by the Ibero-American Association of Women Entrepreneurs.

In 2001, Menafra was recognized by the country's journalists who awarded her the Woman of the Year Prize, with the 2001 Honorable Mention, for her work on behalf of Uruguayan women. She also received, in Japan, the Women´s College Award of Highest Honor from the Soka Gakkai International.

On 5 December 2001, she was distinguished with the Woman Social Volunteer award, as part of the International Year of Volunteers, from the organization Voces Solidarias.

Mercedes Menafra conceived of and founded Todos por Uruguay, a non-profit association which leads and develops in the following areas: Made Here, Scholastic Smiles, The Creole Table, Musical Journey, Different Capacities, United Hands, and Computers for More Schools.

On 1 March 2005 her term as First Lady ended. She continued as president of Todos por Uruguay.

On 8 March 2006, on the occasion of International Women's Day, at the Hotel Jean Clevers in Punta del Este, the organization Zonta Punta del Este-Maldonado, a member of Zonta International, gave Mercedes Menafra the distinction Woman of the Year 2005.

Her husband, former President Jorge Batlle, died on 24 October 2016.

== Bibliography ==
- Vierci, Pablo (2015). Ellas 5. Montevideo: Aguaclara. ISBN 9789974994232.
