= Matilde Pacheco =

First Lady of Uruguay (1854–1926)

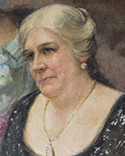
Matilde Pacheco

Matilde Irene Pacheco Stewart (September 20, 1854 – February 13, 1926) was the First Lady of Uruguay at the beginning of the 20th century.

== Biography ==
Stewart was born in Buenos Aires, Argentina, daughter of Manuel Pacheco y Obes (1813–1869), a brother of Melchor Pacheco y Obes; her mother, Anne Stewart Agell, was a sister of Duncan Stewart. As a young child, she was orphaned and immigrated to Uruguay.

Matilde Pacheco married Ruperto Michaelsson Batlle (a nephew of Lorenzo Batlle y Grau) in 1872, with whom she had five children: Matilde, Ruperto, Juan Luis, Guillermo, and Carlos Michaelsson Pacheco. Afterwards she married in 1894 with a cousin of her first husband, José Batlle y Ordóñez, with whom she also had five children: César (1885); Rafael (1887); Amalia Ana (1892); Ana Amalia (1894); and Lorenzo (1897).
