= María Auxiliadora Delgado =

Uruguayan civil servant (1937–2019)

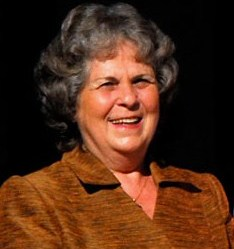
- Auxiliadora in 2007

First Lady of Uruguay
- In role 1 March 2015 – 31 July 2019
- President: Tabaré Vázquez
- Preceded by: Lucía Topolansky
- Succeeded by: Lorena Ponce de León (2020)
- In role 1 March 2005 – 1 March 2010
- President: Tabaré Vázquez
- Preceded by: Mercedes Menafra
- Succeeded by: Lucía Topolansky

Personal details
- Born: María Auxiliadora Delgado San Martín; 11 March 1937 Montevideo, Uruguay
- Died: 31 July 2019 (aged 82) Montevideo, Uruguay
- Spouse: Tabaré Vázquez (m. 1964)
- Children: Álvaro, Fabián, Ignacio, Javier

María Auxiliadora Delgado San Martín (11 March 1937 – 31 July 2019) was an Uruguayan civil servant, health advocate, and wife of President Tabaré Vázquez. She served as First Lady of Uruguay from 2005 to 2010 and from 2015 up to her death in 2019.

== Early life ==
Auxiliadora met her husband, Tabaré Vázquez, when he was just 16 years old, and she was 19 years old. She worked for the Caja de Jubilaciones y Pensiones (Pension Fund) for 32 years before her retirement.

== First Lady ==
Auxiliadora's signature initiative as First Lady was a national program to improve dental health and oral hygiene. She oversaw the national campaign, with an emphasis on students from rural schools and communities. Her program, Plan Bucal, which was launched in 2005, has provided dental services to more than 100,000 children across Uruguay, as of 2015. In December 2015, the General Assembly of Uruguay honored her with an award for her work.

The First Lady rarely granted interviews during her tenures.

== Death ==
She died of a heart attack on 31 July 2019. Her husband survived her by 16 months, dying of cancer in December 2020. She was buried alongside him at Cementerio de La Teja, Montevideo.

== Bibliography ==
- Vierci, Pablo (2015). Ellas 5. Montevideo: Aguaclara. ISBN 9789974994232.
