= Juan Carlos Raffo Frávega =

Uruguayan politician (1894–1967)

Undated portrait of Raffo Frávega

Juan Carlos Raffo Frávega (30 July 1894 – 20 July 1967) was a Uruguayan politician who was President of the Senate of Uruguay from 1 March 1959 to 1 March 1963. He was a member of the National Party.

== See also ==
- List of presidents of the Senate of Uruguay
