= Rodolfo M. Fattoruso =

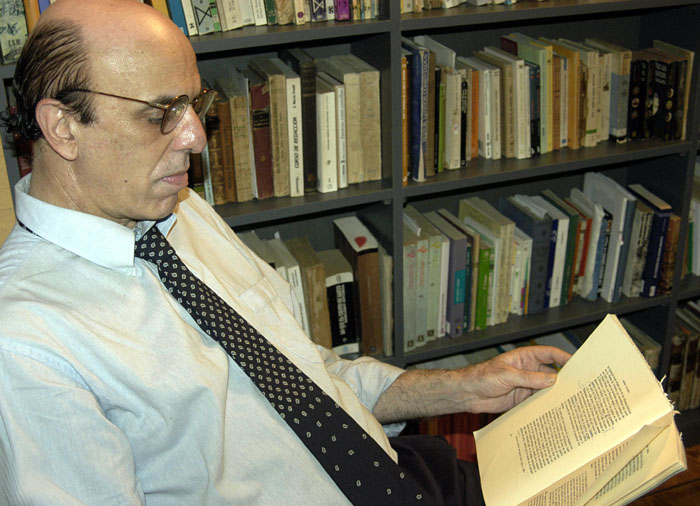
Rodolfo Fattoruso

Rodolfo Macías Fattoruso (born in 1953 in Montevideo, Uruguay) is a literary critic and editor. He has worked as a literary critic since 1976.

He writes in Búsqueda, a Montevidean weekly newspaper and teaches classic literature and philosophy in his Cultural Workshop. He specialized in philosophic aspects of Jorge Luis Borges’s works.

He has been an advisor to Presidents Julio María Sanguinetti and Jorge Batlle. In 2006-2007 he was spokesperson of the Uruguayan Military Circle. He is a full member of the Historical and Geographical Institute of Uruguay and a member of the Colonel Rolando Laguarda Trías Institute of Military Culture and History, which is part of the Historical Studies Department of the Army General Staff.

He founded a publishing company called Artemisa Editores.

== Books ==
- Francia-Uruguay. Historia de sus Confluencias (1988)
- Los Seres Queridos (Editorial Fin de Siglo, 1998).
- De William Shakespeare No Se Puede Hablar. Meditaciones Sobre el Poder (Artemisa Editores, 2008).
