= Atanasio Aguirre =

President of Uruguay (1801–1875)

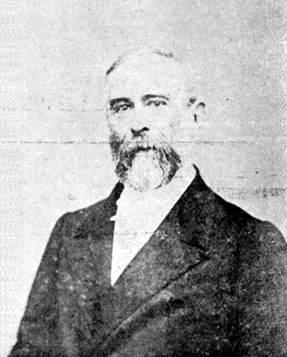

Acting President of Uruguay
- In office 1 March 1864 – February 1865
- Preceded by: Bernardo Berro
- Succeeded by: Tomás Villalba

President of the Senate of Uruguay
- In office 1864–1865

President of the Chamber of Deputies of Uruguay
- In office 1853

Personal details
- Born: 2 June 1801
- Died: 28 September 1875 (aged 74)
- Party: National

Atanasio de la Cruz Aguirre (2 June 1801 – 28 September 1875) was acting President of Uruguay from 1864 to 1865.

== Background ==
Aguirre was a member of the National Party. He served as the President of the Chamber of Deputies of Uruguay in 1853. He was a Senator from 1861.

On March 1, 1864, Bernardo Berro stepped down from the Presidency.

== President of Uruguay ==
He assumed the Presidency of Uruguay as next-in-line, in his capacity of President of the Senate of Uruguay. This lasted until February 1865.

During the Paraguayan War, Francisco Solano López had sought to send an army to aid Aguirre against Venancio Flores, who was supported by Brazilian troops.

With Montevideo under siege, Atanasio de la Cruz Aguirre stepped down from the Presidency in favour of Senator Tomás Villalba, who soon made peace with the Colorado Party besiegers, allied with Brazil.

This transition of power marked the coming to Presidential office of heads of state of the Colorado Party, which then remained in office for nearly a century.

== See also ==
- Politics of Uruguay

Political offices
Preceded by Bernardo Berro	President of Uruguay; Acting; 1864-1865	Succeeded by Tomás Villalba
