= Beatriz Argimón =

Uruguayan politician (born 1961)

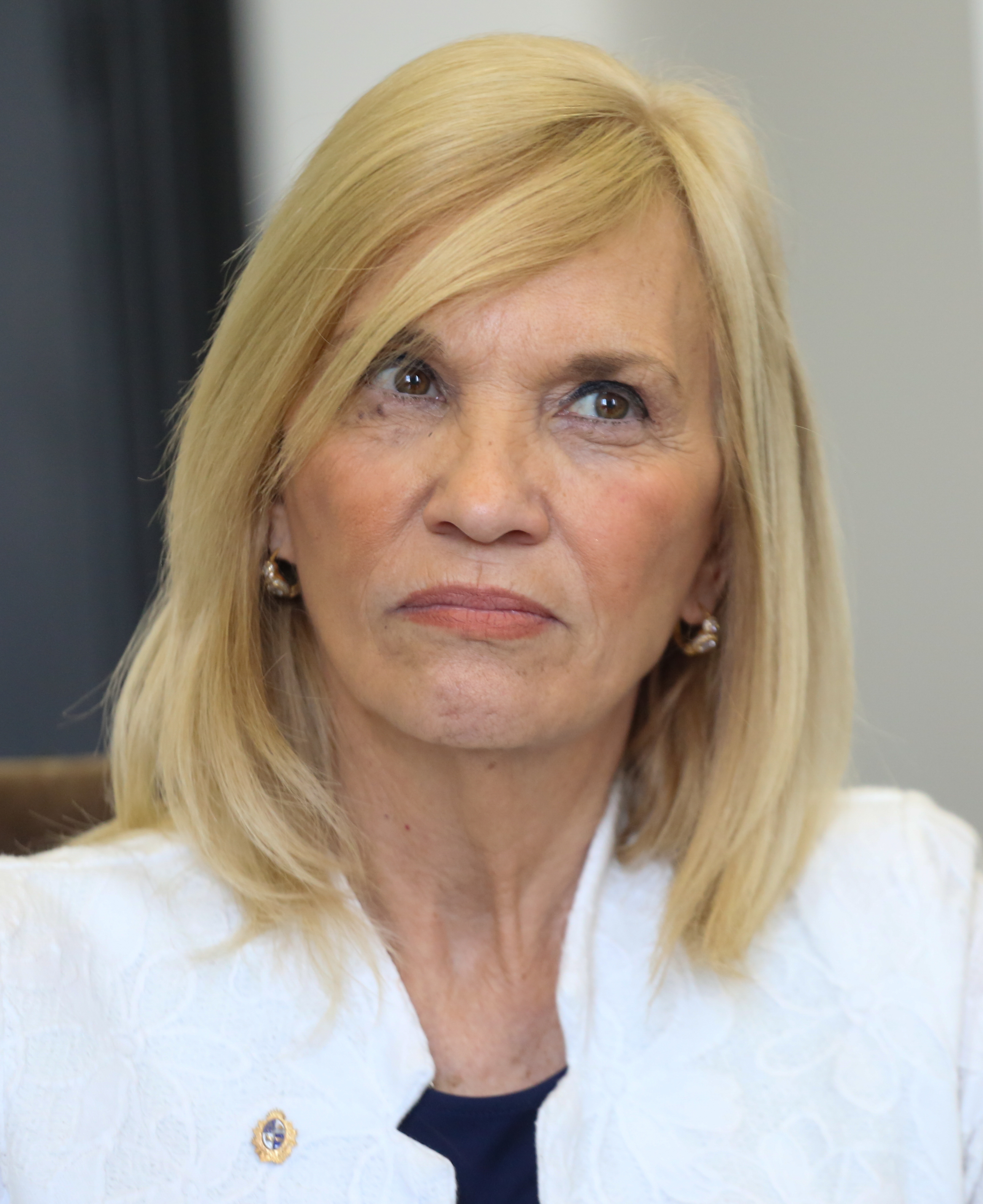
- Argimón in 2024

18th Vice President of Uruguay
- In office 1 March 2020 – 1 March 2025
- President: Luis Lacalle Pou
- Preceded by: Lucía Topolansky
- Succeeded by: Carolina Cosse

President of the National Party
- In office 16 April 2018 – 9 March 2020
- Preceded by: Luis Alberto Héber
- Succeeded by: Pablo Abdala

Representative of Uruguay
- In office 15 February 2000 – 15 February 2010
- Constituency: Montevideo

Personal details
- Born: Beatriz Argimón Cedeira; 14 August 1961 (age 65) Montevideo, Uruguay
- Party: National Party
- Spouse: Jorge Fernández Reyes (m. 2009)
- Children: María Belén; Juan Santiago
- Education: University of the Republic

Beatriz Argimón Cedeira (born 14 August 1961) is a Uruguayan politician and notary of the National Party who served as the 18th vice president of Uruguay from 2020 to 2025, being the first woman to be elected in that position.

After graduating from the University of the Republic in 1989 with a degree in notarization, she also studied human rights, family law, and juvenile law. She served as a National Representative for the Montevideo Department between 2000 and 2010, and has been a member of the National Party Board since 2009. She is also a member of the executive committee of the Inter-Parliamentary Union since November 2020. She is an activist for women's rights, and was one of the founders of the "Network of Political Women" and of the "Bicameral Female Caucus" of the General Assembly.

== Early life and education ==
Beatriz Argimón Cedeira was born in Montevideo on 14 August 1961 to Juan Carlos Argimón, a civil servant for the Herrerism political faction of the National Party, and María Esther Cedeira, a housewife. Her paternal grandmother had brothers who fought in battles alongside Aparicio Saravia, and her grandfather was a member of the National Movement of Rocha. The oldest child in a Catholic family of Catalan and Galician descent, she has one sister, Estela. She attended Primary School No. 8 República de Haití in Montevideo, and later high school at the José Pedro Varela National School.

When Argimón was in high school, her father, who worked as manager of the fishing terminal of Industrias Loberas y Pesqueras del Estado, was dismissed by the civic-military dictatorship, but was reinstated in the position once the regime ended. In 1989, Argimón graduated from the University of the Republic as a notary public, working in the field for ten years. She also studied human rights and family law. While she was studying, she began to work as an administrator for the National Administration of State Sanitary Works, a position to which she agreed after winning a public competition.

Argimón has also been active as a television personality. In 2007, she acted, together with Glenda Rondán and several Uruguayan actresses and public women, in the play Los monologues de la vagina, to benefit the Casa de la Mujer, a women's rights organization, in order to denounce gender violence against women. From 2008 to 2011, she served as a panelist on the Teledoce weekday program, Esta boca es mía. In addition, from 2015 to 2017, Argimón was the president of the Josefa Oribe Study and Training Center. She currently hosts a cable program called Diseñarte, along with María Noel Álvarez and Claudia Calace on Canal 5, which aims to promote nationally manufactured products.

Argimón is a founding member of the Álvarez Caldeyro Barcia Foundation, which helps the needs of premature children.

== Political career ==
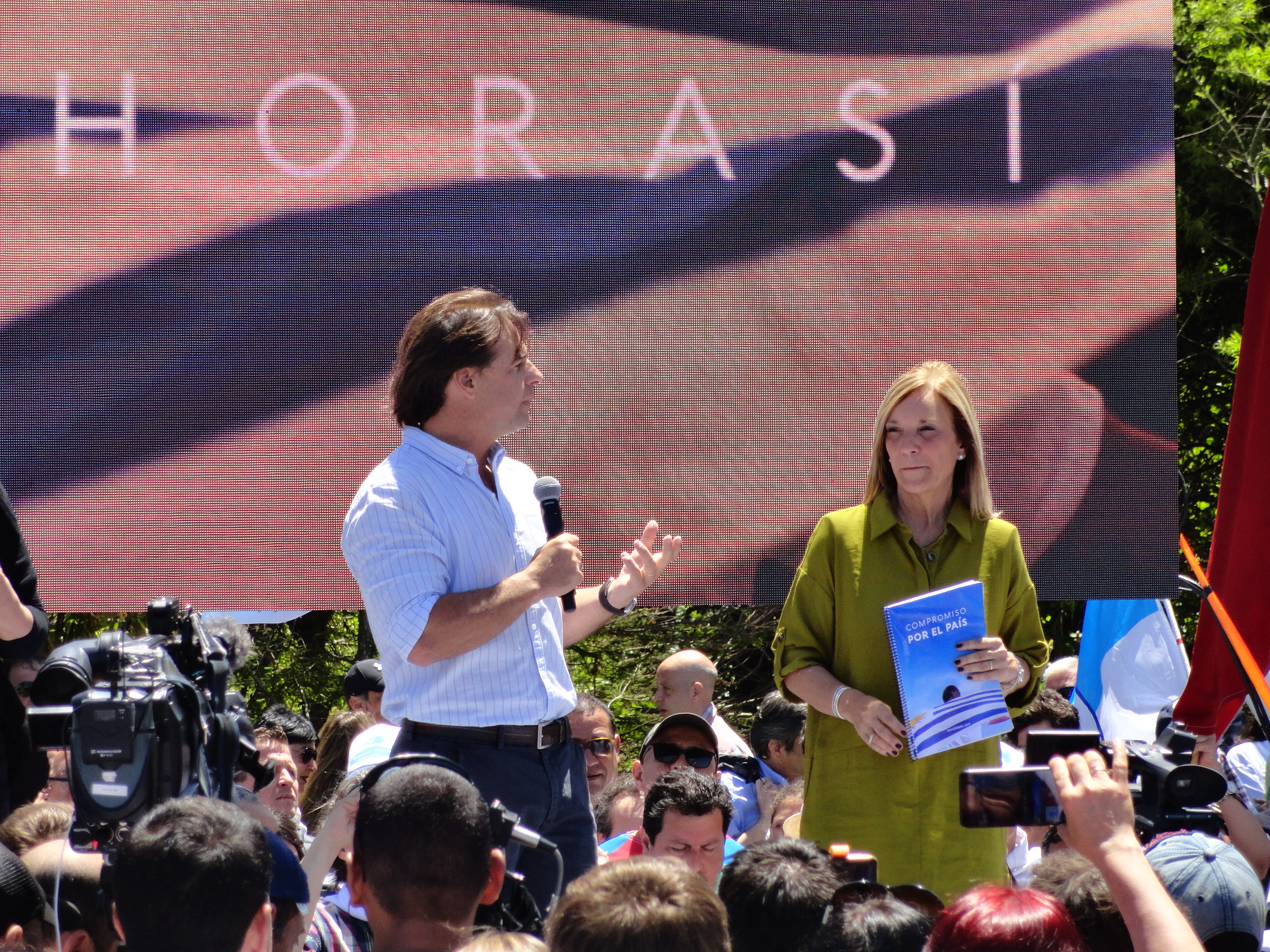
Luis Lacalle Pou (left) and Beatriz Argimón (right) during a rally.

Beatriz Argimón began her political activism at the age of 17 during the dictatorship. Four months after graduating from college, she was a candidate for Edila de Montevideo (member of the legislature of the capital) in the 1989 election. During Luis Alberto Lacalle's administration, she served as head of the National Institute of Minors. Together with the then first lady Julia Pou, Argimón founded the group "Acción Comunitaria", and was elected National Representative for Montevideo for the 45th Legislature (2000–2005) in the 1999 election. Later she joined the Wilsonist Current, being reelected to the position of the 46th Legislature (2005–2010). She became the first woman reelected consecutively in the history of the National Party.

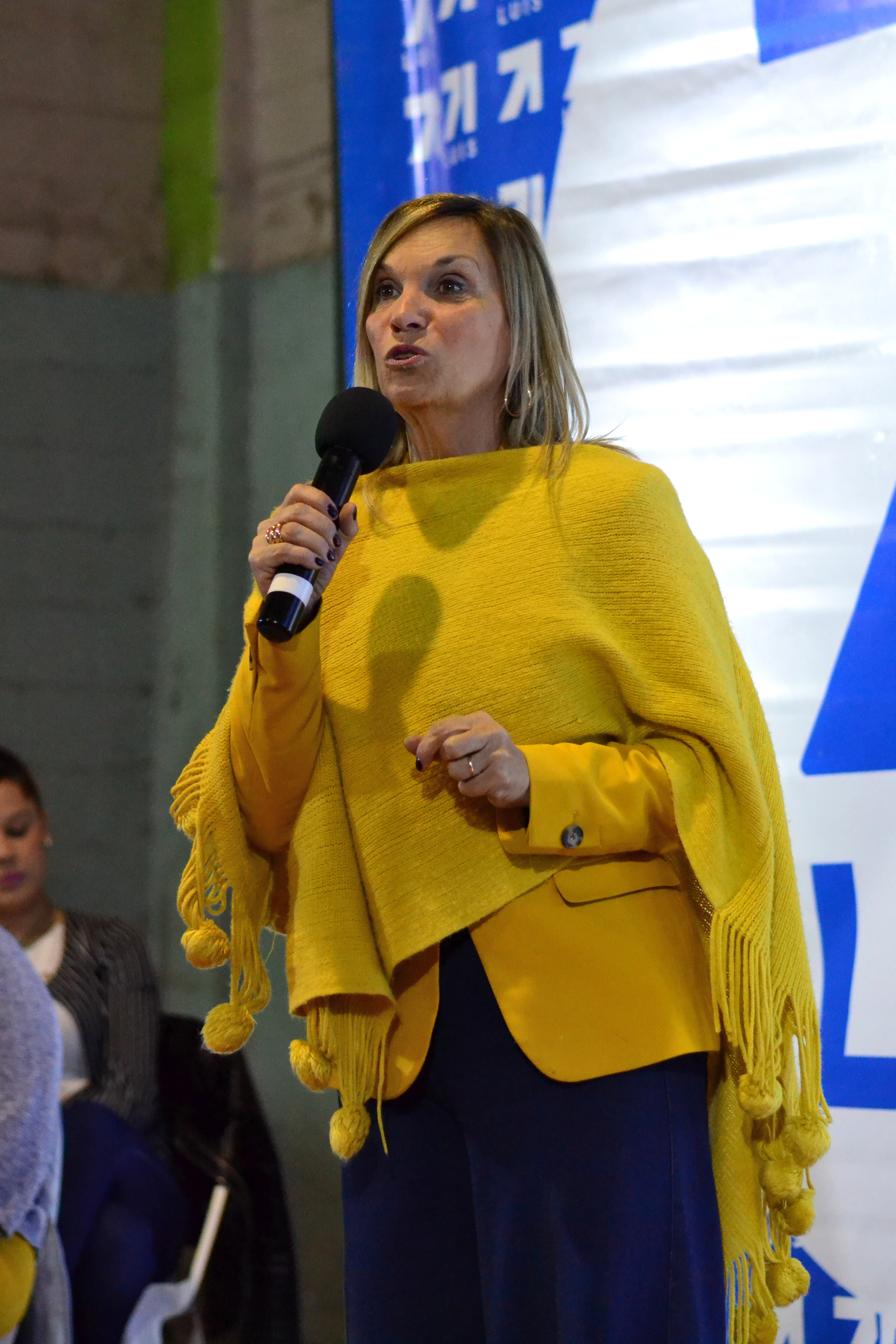
Argimón in 2019

In the course of 2007, Argimón declared herself independent within the PN. In the 2009 presidential primaries, she presented her own ballot (list 2018) and endorsed Jorge Larrañaga for president. In the 2014 primaries, she endorsed Luis Lacalle Pou for president, having served as one of his alternates in the Senate.

On April 16, 2018, she took office as President of the National Party, being the first woman to hold the position in the 182-year history of the party. She succeeded Luis Alberto Héber and stated, "We must respect the times that each institution and each party have to make decisions of these characteristics." She remained in office until March 2020 because at that time she assumed the vice-presidency of the Republic.

== Vice presidency ==
In the 2019 presidential primaries, Luis Lacalle Pou won by 53% of the votes, and named Argimón as his vice presidential running mate for the October general election.

Following the election of Lacalle Pou as President of Uruguay in the 2019 election, Argimón assumed office as vice president of Uruguay on 1 March 2020, becoming the first female vice president to be elected. On November 30, in her first speech as vice president-elect, Argimón reaffirmed her commitment to the fight for gender equality. She was sworn in before the General Assembly on March 1, 2020.

== Personal life ==
Argimón married Jorge Fernández Reyes on 14 December 2009. She has two children from previous marriages, María Belén and Juan Santiago.
