= Juan Lindolfo Cuestas =

Uruguayan politician (1837–1905)

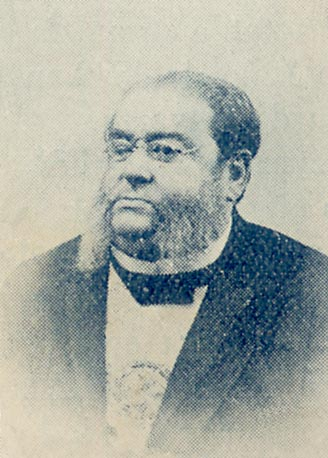

18th President of Uruguay
- In office March 1, 1899 – March 1, 1903
- Preceded by: José Batlle y Ordóñez (Acting)
- Succeeded by: José Batlle y Ordóñez

President of Uruguay
- In office August 25, 1897 – February 5, 1899; Acting: August 25, 1897 – February 10, 1898
- Preceded by: Juan Idiarte Borda
- Succeeded by: José Batlle y Ordóñez (Acting)

1st Minister of Justice, Worship and Public Instruction
- In office 1884–1886
- President: Máximo Santos
- Succeeded by: Aureliano Rodríguez Larreta

34th and 38th Minister of Finance
- In office 1880–1882
- President: Francisco Antonino Vidal
- Preceded by: Juan Peñalva
- Succeeded by: José Ladislao Terra
- In office 1875–1876
- President: Pedro Varela
- Preceded by: José Cándido Bustamante
- Succeeded by: Juan Andrés Vázquez

Personal details
- Born: 6 January 1837 Paysandú, Uruguay
- Died: 21 June 1905 (aged 68) Paris, France
- Party: Colorado Party
- Spouse: Ángela Fernández González

Juan Lindolfo de los Reyes Cuestas (6 January 1837 – 21 June 1905) was a Uruguayan politician who served as the 18th President of Uruguay from 1897 until 1899 and for a second term from 1899 to 1903.

== Background ==
Juan Lindolfo Cuestas was a prominent member of the Uruguayan Colorado Party, which dominated the country's politics for over a century. He was Minister of Finance from 1875 to 1876 and from 1880 to 1882. He served as Minister of Justice and Education from 1884 to 1886.

His son, Juan Cuestas, was a diplomat.

== President of Uruguay ==
=== First term ===
Lindolfo Cuestas first assumed the Presidency in crisis circumstances . On August 25, 1897 the sitting President of Uruguay, Juan Idiarte Borda was assassinated by a gunman, Avelino Arredondo. Lindolfo Cuestas as the President of the Senate of Uruguay became president.

Within two years Lindolfo Cuestas had ceded the Presidency to José Batlle y Ordóñez on an interim basis.

=== Second term ===
He soon reassumed the office, however, and served until 1903, when he again stepped down in favour of José Batlle y Ordóñez.

=== Political background ===
Lindolfo Cuestas's periods of Presidential office were characterized by crises, not only originating from the assassination of Idiarte, but also by internal dissension within the Colorado Party and by strife with the Opposition Blanco Party, which continued to propel the country into outbreaks of the intermittent Civil War which beset Uruguay throughout the mid- to late- 19th century.

In 1898, as noted by one study, Cuestas "dissolved the chambers that had been elected with notorious vices of fraud. By dissolving the chambers, he convenes a state council with legislative powers and with representatives of the three parties that were active at that time: Colorado, national and constitutional. This state council approved an electoral reform that gave representation to minorities and mandated the formation of the permanent Civic Registry."

== Post presidency ==
After relinquishing the Presidency for the second time, in 1903, the country soon slipped into civil war, the decisive battle of which was the Battle of Masoller in 1904. Lindolfo Cuestas died in 1905.

== See also ==
- Colorado Party (Uruguay)#Earlier History
- Politics of Uruguay
- List of political families#Uruguay

Political offices
Preceded by Juan Idiarte Borda	President of Uruguay; 1897–1899	Succeeded by José Batlle y Ordóñez
Preceded by José Batlle y Ordóñez	President of Uruguay; 1899–1903	Succeeded by José Batlle y Ordóñez
