= Interim governorship of Joaquín Suárez =

Interim governorship of Uruguay

- Interim governorship of Joaquín Suárez; 2 December – 22 December 1828
- Governor: Joaquín Suárez
- Party: None
- Appointed by: Constitutional Assembly

The interim governorship of Joaquín Suárez was the pre-Constitution government period of Uruguay which began after his appointment by the Constitutional Assembly as the interim substitute Governor and Captain General from 2 December until 22 December 1828 when the elected Governor and Captain General José Rondeau assumed his charge. During the twenty days of this brief period the cessation of all foreign authorities on the territory was ordered and several national symbols were established.

== Background ==
In order to put an end to the Cisplatine War that disputed the sovereignty of the Oriental Province and the Oriental Missions territories, the United Provinces of the River Plate and the Empire of Brazil signed in August 1828 a Preliminar Peace Convention, agreeing to resign from their claims to the State of Montevideo and to declare it as an independent country.

Once the convention was ratified by each of the contracting parties, by Brazil on 30 August, signed by Lavalleja on 20 September, and by the United Provinces on 29 September, with the exchange of letters on 4 October 1828 the treaty came into force and according to its provisions the newly created state had to call for elections for representatives, to establish a government and to draft the new Constitution. During this same month the elections were performed and on 22 November the new Assembly was formed, and on 24 November this legislative body declared itself as a Constitutional Assembly.

On 1 December 1828 the Constitutional Assembly in a vote decided to appoint José Rondeau as the future Provisional Governor of Uruguay, but because he was still in Argentina running an official seat, until he could come to Uruguay to pledge his oath, Joaquín Suárez was designated as substitute Governor and assumed his charge on 2 December. He had already led the nation when it was the Provincia Oriental, between 1826 and 1827.

== Domestic policy ==
During the first days of December the sessions of the Assembly and the Governor were suspended as meanwhile the authorities' seats were transferred to Canelones. This period of Joaquín Suárez as a substitute governor showed Suárez maintaining a «low profile» pace regarding reforms without making anything important, with the exception of the following policies.

First National Flag.

First National Cockade.

In this term several featured regulations were approved. One of them was regarding the symbols of the country, being that the law of 6 December 1828 to create the original version of the National Flag of Uruguay, from a request of governor Suárez. The number of blued stripes was the same of the number of existing departments at that time. The only article in this law said:

The State flag shall be white with nine horizontal sky blue colored stripes and alternated, leaving at the upper angle next to the flagpole side a white square where a Sun shall be placed.

On 13 December governor Suárez made a decree where it was declared the cessation of all foreign authorities on the territory, that because it gained its full independence and sovereignty, the jurisdiction of everything there had to belong to the local government. It also forbade courts, public officials and citizens in general to obey or fulfill orders from foreign powers. Besides that rules it also make a government promise to respect the people, the properties, the freedom of speech and freedom of press. According to Francisco Berra, this decree expressed the wishes of his creator, but also from its contents it looked like something typical of a dictator who has all the power of the State in his hands and to make Legislative and Judicial powers being subject to the Executive.

Another relevant law was the one approved on 19 December and coming into force on 22 December, to establish the first National Cockade. The text of the article said:

The National cockade shall be sky blue colored.

== See also ==
- José Rondeau

== Bibliography ==
- Acevedo, Eduardo (1919). Historia del Uruguay (in Spanish). Vol. II: abarca los gobiernos de Lavalleja, Rondeau, Rivera y Oribe, desde 1825 hasta 1838. Montevideo: Imprenta Nacional.
- Compilación de Leyes y Decretos 1825-1930 (in Spanish). Vol. I (1825-1834). Montevideo: IMPO. 1930.
- Castellanos, Alfredo (2011). Historia Uruguaya (in Spanish). Vol. 5: La Cisplatina, la independencia y la República Caudillesca. Montevideo: Ediciones de la Banda Oriental. ISBN 978-9974-1-0454-9.
