= Rafael Batlle Pacheco =

Uruguayan journalist

Rafael Batlle Pacheco (1888, Montevideo – 1960) was a Uruguayan journalist.

== Background ==
He was a journalist on the newspaper El Día and a prominent member of the Uruguayan Colorado Party. Although he was never elected to office, his political positions were very influential.

He was a son of Matilde Pacheco and long-serving President of Uruguay José Batlle y Ordóñez. He was a brother of Lorenzo and César Batlle Pacheco.

== See also ==
- Politics of Uruguay
- List of political families#Uruguay
