= Luis Eduardo Pérez =

1st Interim President of Uruguay

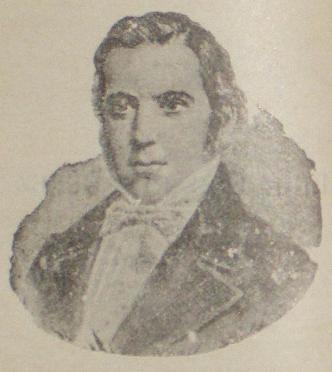

Interim President of Uruguay
- In office October 24, 1830 – November 6, 1830
- Succeeded by: Fructuoso Rivera

Personal details
- Born: 12 October 1774 Montevideo
- Died: 30 August 1841, 1841 (aged 66–67) Uruguay
- Party: Colorado Party

Luis Eduardo Pérez (1774 – August 30, 1841) was the first interim president of Uruguay.

== President of the Senate ==
Pérez was President of the Senate of Uruguay 1830-1833 and 1840, and it was in that capacity that he acted as interim Head of State in 1830.

=== First interim President of Uruguay in 1830 ===
He was President of Uruguay as an interim measure from October 24, 1830 to November 6 of the same year.

== Death ==
He died in 1841.

== See also ==
- History of Uruguay
