= Tomás Villalba =

Uruguayan politician (1805–1886)

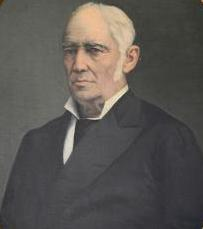

20th President of Uruguay
- In office 15 February 1865 – 20 February 1865
- Preceded by: Atanasio Aguirre
- Succeeded by: Venancio Flores

Personal details
- Born: Tomás Villalba y Albin; 9 December 1805
- Died: 12 July 1886 (aged 80)
- Party: Blanco Party

Tomás Villalba y Albin (9 December 1805 – 12 July 1886) was a Uruguayan politician who served as interim President for five days (15 to 20 February 1865), at the end of the Uruguayan War, which had begun on 10 August 1864. The war was fought between the governing Blanco Party and the Colorado Party, with the latter supported openly by the Empire of Brazil and covertly by the Argentine president, Bartolomé Mitre. The Uruguayan War was part an almost continuous struggle between the Blanco and Colorado factions since Uruguayan independence in 1828, and was closely linked to a wider regional conflict involving Argentina, Brazil, Paraguay and Uruguay which culminated in the Paraguayan War (also known as the War of the Triple Alliance). The Colorado leader Venancio Flores started a rebellion in 1863 to overthrow Blanco President Bernardo Berro, who led a coalition Colorado–Blanco government. After a series of battles, the Colorados and the Brazilian army controlled most of the country, with the Blancos left in control of just the capital, Montevideo. On March 1, 1864, President Berro stepped down and was replaced by a hard-line senator, Atanasio Aguirre.

On 2 February 1865, the Brazilian navy began a blockade of Montevideo, but temporarily relaxed it to allow foreigners to be evacuated to Buenos Aires. The relaxation of the blockade was extended to the middle of February to allow the Uruguayan Senate to elect a new President of the Senate. Anastasio Aquirre's term ended on 15 February, whereupon the Senate elected the moderate Tomás Villalba to replace him. Villalba immediately asked for a contingent of foreign troops, from Britain, France, Italy and Spain, to land in Montevideo as a means of preventing the more radical members of the Blanco Party from attempting to overthrow Villalba. The new president reached an agreement with Flores and a peace accord was signed on 20 February, which included a general amnesty for Blancos and Colorados. Villalba stepped down to allow Flores to become interim president, prior to new elections.

Before assuming the national presidency, Villalba had been the President of the Senate of Uruguay from 24 April 1863 until 15 February 1865. Previously, Villalba had also served as the Minister of Finance from 29 March 1860 to 22 June 1861, in the second government of President Berro, prior to which he appears to have served as Accountant General in 1858. After stepping down from the presidency, Villalba published a report on 18 March 1865, about the Uruguayan banking industry, followed by a decree on 23 March 1865, which created banking regulations for the first time in Uruguayan history.

Political offices
Preceded by Atanasio Aguirre	President of Uruguay; 1865	Succeeded by Venancio Flores
