= Lucía Topolansky =

Uruguayan politician (born 1944)

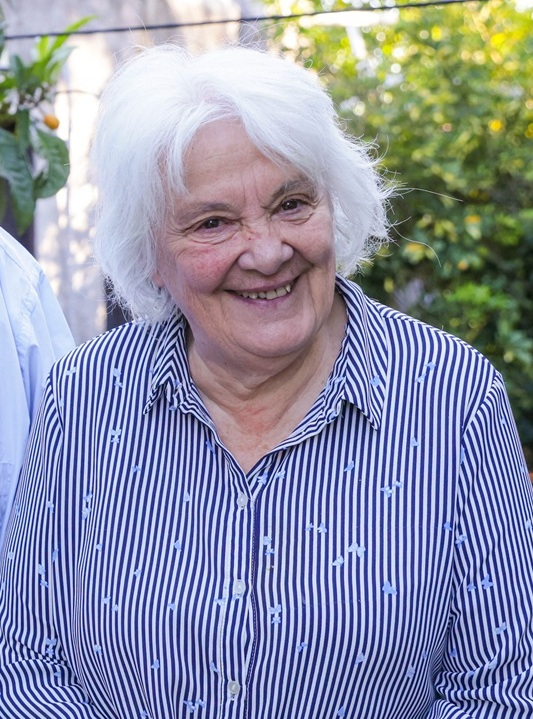
- Topolansky in 2023

17th Vice President of Uruguay
- In office 13 September 2017 – 1 March 2020
- President: Tabaré Vázquez
- Preceded by: Raúl Sendic
- Succeeded by: Beatriz Argimón

First Lady of Uruguay
- In role 1 March 2010 – 1 March 2015
- President: José Mujica
- Preceded by: María Auxiliadora Delgado
- Succeeded by: María Auxiliadora Delgado

Senator of Uruguay
- In office 15 February 2005 – 12 September 2017
- Constituency: At-large

Representative of Uruguay
- In office 15 February 2000 – 14 February 2005
- Constituency: Montevideo

Personal details
- Born: Lucía Topolansky Saavedra; 25 September 1944 (age 81) Montevideo, Uruguay
- Party: Movement of Popular Participation
- Other political affiliations: Broad Front
- Spouse: José Mujica (m. 2005; died 2025)
- Parent(s): Luis Topolansky; María Elia Saavedra

Lucía Topolansky Saavedra (born 25 September 1944) is a Uruguayan politician and former revolutionary who served as the 17th vice president of Uruguay from September 2017 to March 2020. A member of the Movement of Popular Participation (MPP) — Broad Front, she also served as Senator of the Republic from 2020 to 2022 and from 2005 to 2017, as National Representative from 2000 to 2005 and as First Lady of Uruguay as the wife of president José Mujica from 2010 to 2015.

Raised in an upper-class family, in 1969 Topolansky joined the far-left guerrilla group Tupamaros and went underground. In 1985, due to the amnesty law, she was released and participated in the founding of the MPP, starting her political career. In 1995 she was elected as a member of the Montevideo legislature, and in 2004 she was elected as a substitute National Representative, assuming the seat after the death of the incumbent Jorge Quartino. However, she took over as Senator of the Republic, as she was the first substitute for her husband José Mujica who left the seat to take office as Minister of Livestock, Agriculture and Fisheries in 2005. She was a candidate for Intendant of Montevideo in the 2015 municipal elections, being defeated by Daniel Martínez Villamil.

In September 2017, she took office as Vice President of Uruguay after the resignation of Raúl Sendic Rodríguez, becoming the first woman to hold the position.

== Early life ==
Lucía Topolansky Saavedra was born on 25 September 1944 in the capital city of Montevideo, the youngest of seven children along with her twin sister, María Elia. Her father, Luis Topolansky Müller, was a civil engineer and construction businessman, who was married to María Elia Saavedra Rodríguez. Topolansky is of paternal Polish noble ancestry from Kraków. Luis was born in Budapest and studied in Vienna, and eventually moved to Uruguay for work. On her mother's side, the Saavedras were an upper-class family of Spanish descent, tracing their heritage to the community of Galicia.

Topolansky grew up in the neighbourhoods of Prado, where she lived at her grandparents' house, and Pocitos. After her father became an associate for a construction company, the family moved to Punta del Este, but returned to Montevideo shortly thereafter when the Uruguayan government opposed the government of then-Argentine president Juan Perón, causing him to prohibit Argentine citizens from spending their summers in Uruguay, resulting in her father's company going bankrupt. Upon returning to Montevideo, her father became ill with cancer, leaving the family in a critical economic situation and becoming dependent on her grandfather, then-Justice of the Peace Enrique Saavedra Barrozo, who supported the family's educational expenses.

During her childhood, she studied at the College Sacré Cœur de las Hermanas Dominicas in Montevideo with her twin sister. She then entered the Alfredo Vásquez Acevedo Institute where she was part of the students' guild, and eventually studied at the University of the Republic in architecture. She abandoned her studies in 1969.

== Guerrilla ==
In 1967, after years of political activity, she joined the left-wing organization Tupamaros, waging guerrilla fights against the authorities in Uruguay. After the coup d'état in 1973, which resulted in the beginning of the civic-military dictatorship under Juan María Bordaberry, Topolansky was arrested and imprisoned in a military prison where she endured physical and psychological torture. During her tenure with the organization, she met her future husband José Mujica, who would eventually become the President of Uruguay from 2010 to 2015. She eventually would be associated with the Movement of Popular Participation (MPP).

== Political offices ==
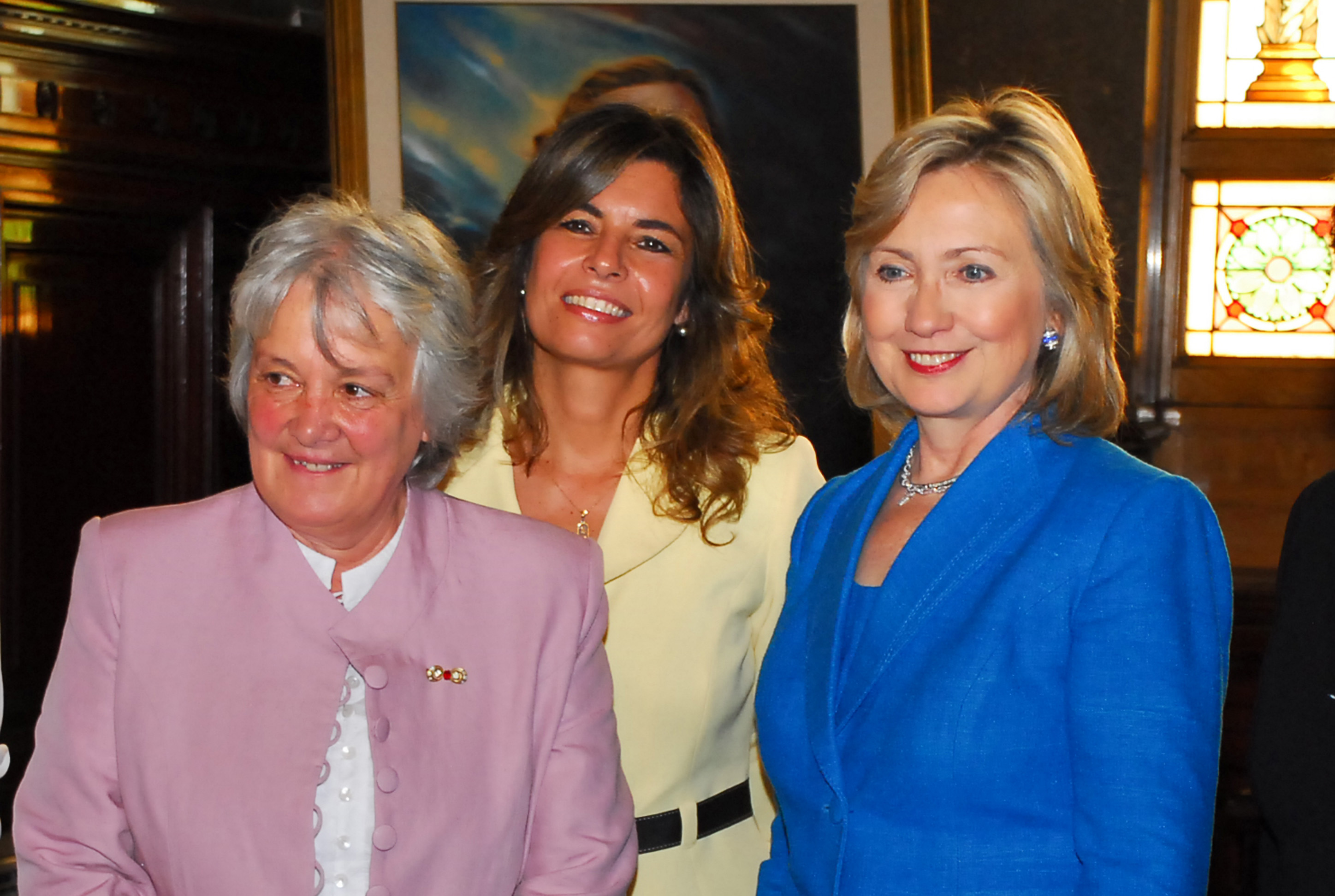
Topolansky alongside Hillary Clinton during the latter's visit to Montevideo in 2010

She served as a Representative for Montevideo from 2000 to 2005 and she subsequently became a Senator. In the 2009 election, she received the highest number of votes for Senator as the leader of the 609 electoral list.

She was considered as a possible running mate for Tabaré Vázquez, the presidential candidate of the ruling coalition, in the 2014 elections.

=== Acting President of Uruguay ===
On 26 November 2010, due to the absence of both President Mujica and Vice-President Danilo Astori, she became acting President, as she was the senator who received the most personal votes in the 2009 election. This made her the first woman to assume the Uruguay presidential powers and duties. This brief tenure as acting president lasted until 28 November 2010, when Vice President Astori returned to Uruguay.

This state of affairs came about because of a clause in the Uruguayan Constitution, which stipulates that the Presidential powers & duties passes temporarily to the leader of the largest elected grouping in the Upper House, if both the President and the Vice President are absent from the territory of the Republic.

=== Vice President of Uruguay ===
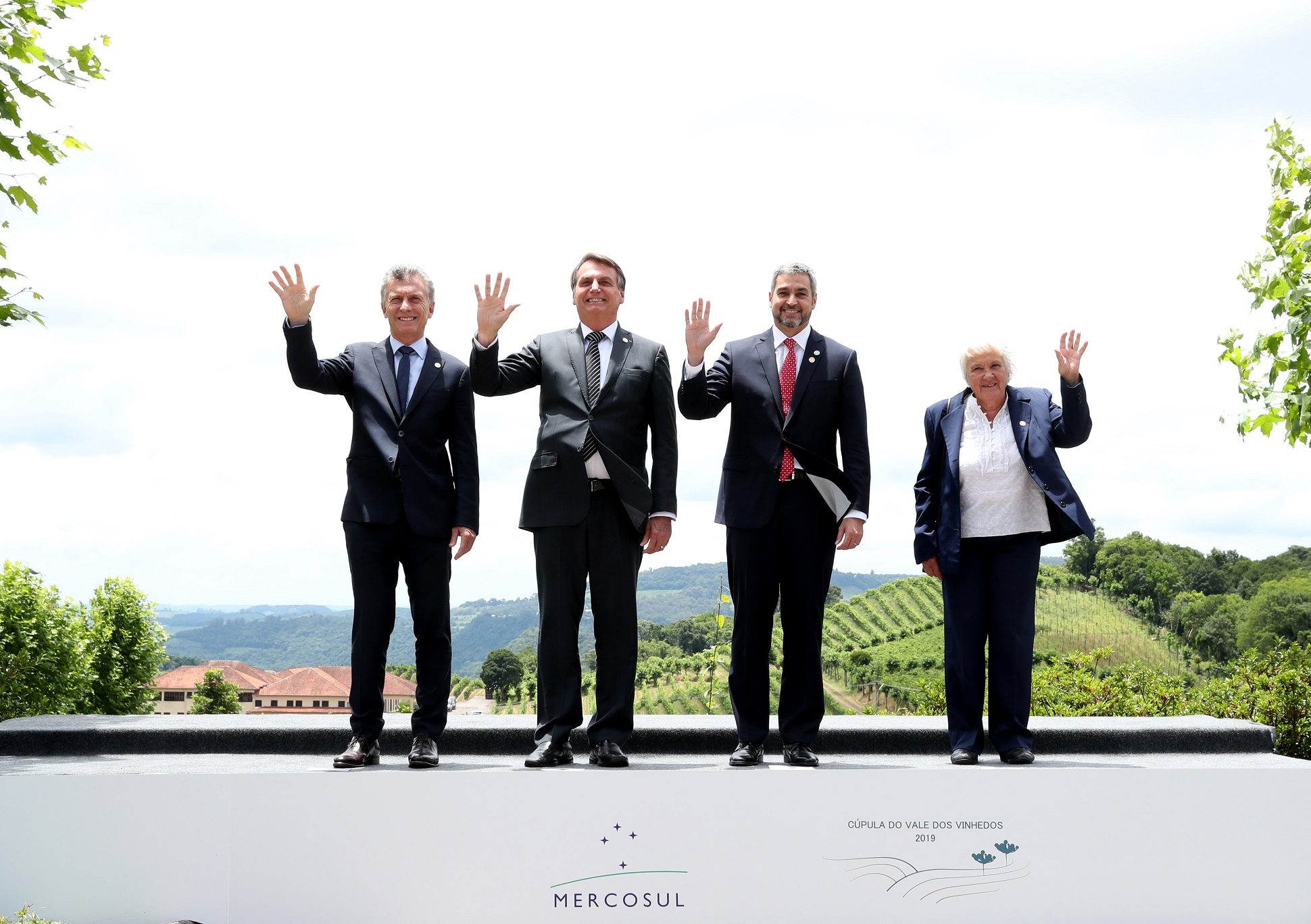
Topolansky (right) during the Southern Common Market summit in Bento Goncalves, 2019

Following the resignation of Raúl Fernando Sendic, after a protracted series of controversies, she was appointed Vice President of Uruguay in Sendic's place on 13 September 2017. This occurred since she was the second most voted Senator on the most voted ballot of the party by which the president and vice president were elected. The Senator with the most votes, Mujica, could not assume the position since he had served as President of the Republic in the previous term.

== See also ==
- Politics of Uruguay
- List of political families#Uruguay

== Bibliography ==
- Cohen, Pablo (2024). Los indomables (in Spanish). Montevideo: Planeta. ISBN 978-9915-692-33-3.
- Vierci, Pablo (2015). Ellas 5 (in Spanish). Montevideo: Aguaclara. ISBN 9789974994232.
