= Pedro Varela =

Uruguayan politician (1837–1906)

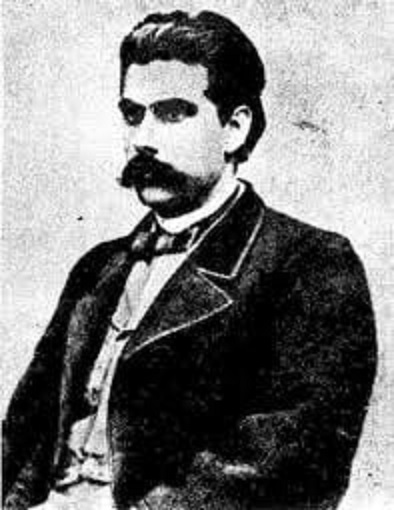
- Varela in 1868

10th President of Uruguay
- In office 22 January 1875 – 10 March 1876
- Preceded by: José Eugenio Ellauri
- Succeeded by: Lorenzo Latorre

Personal details
- Born: 22 February 1837 Florida, Uruguay
- Died: 1906 (aged 68–69) Montevideo, Uruguay
- Party: Colorado Party

Pedro José Varela Olivera (Note: In this name that follows Hispanic American naming customs, the first or paternal surname is Varela and the second or maternal family name is Olivera.) (22 February 1837 – 1906) was a Uruguayan politician and member of the Colorado Party. He served as the President of Uruguay from January 1875 to March 1876, when he resigned under pressure from his minister of war. He was replaced by defense minister Lorenzo Latorre.

He served as the President of the Senate of Uruguay in 1868 and 1873.

== Notes ==
Political offices
Preceded by Venancio Flores	President of Uruguay; Acting; 1868	Succeeded by Lorenzo Batlle y Grau
Preceded by José Eugenio Ellauri	President of Uruguay; Acting; 1875	Succeeded by Pedro Carve
Preceded by Pedro Carve	President of Uruguay; 1875-1876	Succeeded by Lorenzo Latorre
