= Lorenzo Batlle Pacheco =

Uruguayan politician and journalist

Lorenzo Batlle Pacheco (4 March 1897 – 3 December 1954) was a Uruguayan political figure and journalist.

== Background ==
Pacheco was born in Montevideo. He was a journalist on the newspaper El Día and a prominent member of the Uruguayan Colorado Party. He was a son of Matilde Pacheco and long-serving President of Uruguay José Batlle y Ordóñez. Brother of Rafael and César Batlle Pacheco.

== Deputy; Senator ==
Batlle Pacheco was elected as a Deputy in 1927. In 1931 he was elected as a Senator, and was subsequently re-elected to the Senate in 1947.

In 1950, Batlle Pacheco also stood for the nomination of the vice-presidency under César Mayo Gutiérrez, a Batllista who put himself forward as a presidential candidate that year and who promised to (as noted by one journal) “continue the work of social justice that has been the clear heritage of Batllismo” if elected president.

Batlle Pacheco died in 1954, while serving as a Senator.

He also founded the Sunday supplement of "El Dia."

== See also ==
- Politics of Uruguay
- List of political families#Uruguay
