= El Día (Uruguay) =

Uruguayan daily newspaper

- Type: Daily newspaper
- Founded: June 16, 1886, December 10, 2020 (as digital media)
- Ceased publication: 1993 (as printed media)
- Political alignment: Batllism
- Headquarters: Montevideo, Uruguay
- Website: www.eldia.uy

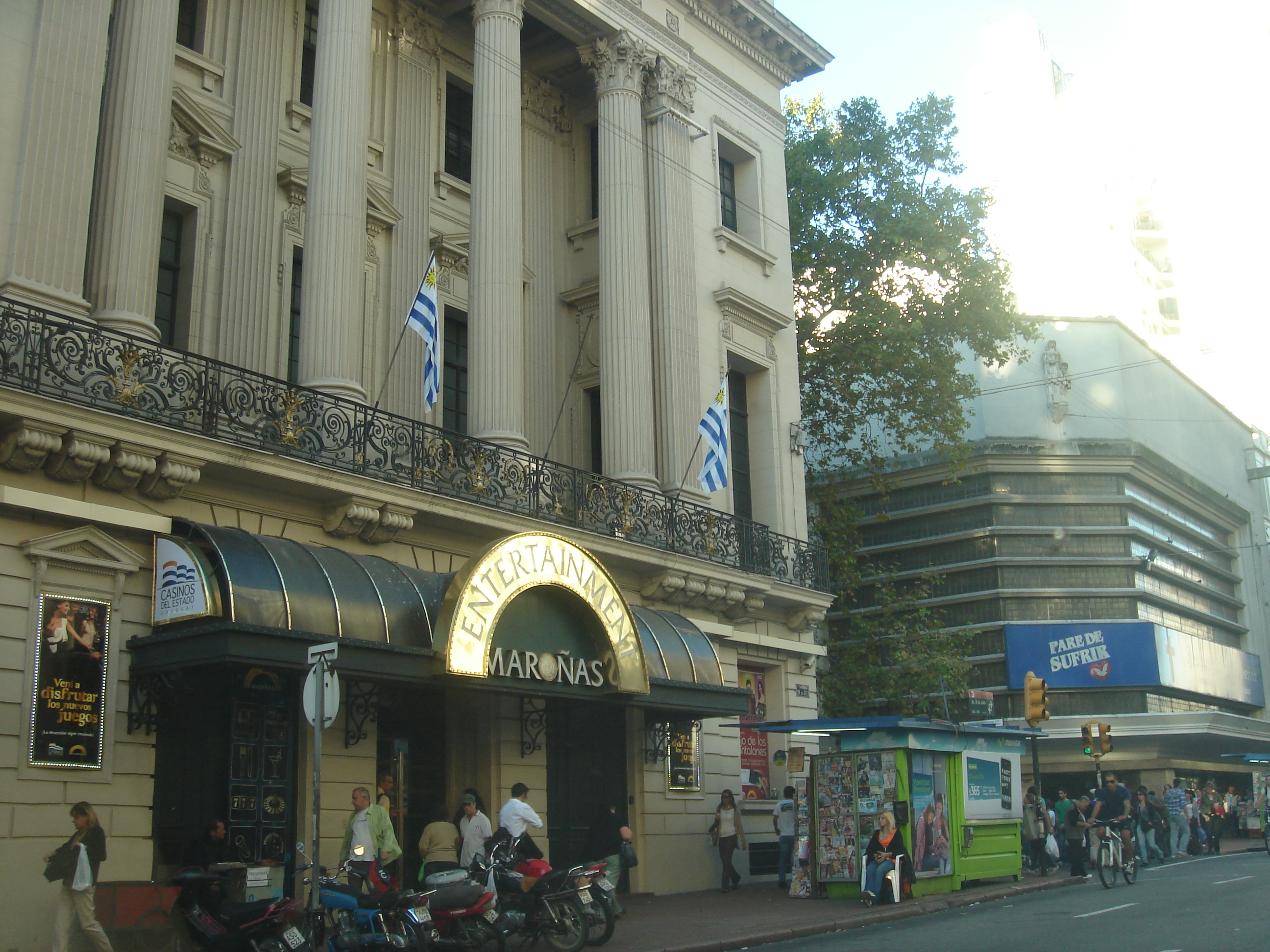
Former building of El Día in downtown Montevideo.

El Día is a Uruguayan daily newspaper.

It was established in 1886 by the prominent Colorado politician José Batlle y Ordóñez. Many of the most important Uruguayan politicians and journalists wrote in its pages: Luis Batlle Berres, Lorenzo Batlle Pacheco, Manuel Flores Mora, Manuel Flores Silva, Jorge Pacheco Areco, Julio María Sanguinetti, Enrique Tarigo, Rodolfo Fattoruso, Alberto Scavarelli, Dora Isella Russell, Rafael Franzini-Batlle, Miguel A. Semino, Mario C. Fernández, Adolfo Castells Mendívil, Daniel Orzuj, Leonardo Guzmán, Horacio Ferrer, Pablo Vierci, etc., as well as the exiled Galician writer Lois Tobío Fernández.

A Sunday supplement was also established by Lorenzo Batlle Pacheco.

At the beginning of the 1990s, this newspaper was experiencing serious financial troubles and ceased to exist. Its neoclassical headquarters was converted into an entertainment venue in the 2000s.

In late 2020, the newspaper was refounded as a digital journal. It still operates to this day. The editor is Rafael Franzini Batlle, great-grandson of José Batlle y Ordoñez.
