= Lorenzo Batlle y Grau =

President of Uruguay

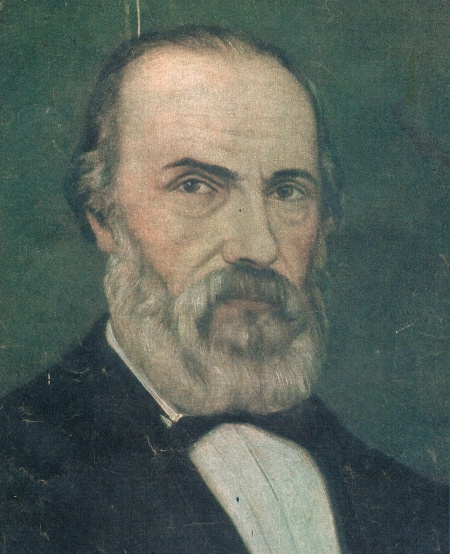

President of Uruguay
- In office 1 March 1868 – 1 March 1872
- Preceded by: Pedro Varela
- Succeeded by: Tomás Gomensoro Albín

Personal details
- Born: 10 August 1810 Montevideo, Viceroyalty of the Río de la Plata
- Died: 8 May 1887 (aged 76) Montevideo, Uruguay
- Party: Colorado Party
- Relatives: Batlle family

Lorenzo Cristóbal Manuel Batlle y Grau (10 August 1810 in Montevideo – 8 May 1887 in Montevideo) was the president of Uruguay from 1868 to 1872.

Hos son José Batlle y Ordóñez, nephew Luis Batlle Berres and great-nephew Jorge Batlle Ibáñez also were presidents of Uruguay.

He was a member of the Colorado Party and was Minister of War three times (1847–1851, 1853-1854 and 1865–1868) and Minister of Finance (1856 to 1857).

In March 1868 interim President Pedro Varela left the presidency and Batlle was elected. He was president from 1868-1872.

== See also ==
- List of political families#Uruguay
- Colorado Party (Uruguay)

Political offices
| Preceded by Pedro Varela | President of Uruguay; 1868–1872 | Succeeded by Tomás Gomensoro Albín |
