= Manuel Basilio Bustamante =

Uruguan politician (1785–1863)

Manuel Basilio Bustamante Piris (20 June 1785 – 11 November 1863) was an Uruguayan politician who served as President of Uruguay from 10 September 1855 to 15 February 1856.

== Life ==
Manuel Basilio Bustamante was born in San Carlos, a city in southern Uruguay. Between 1830 and 1834, he served as the representative for the Colonia Department. He later also served as the representative for the Soriano Department and the Maldonado Department. He became president after Venancio Flores resigned on 10 September 1855. His term lasted for five months, before he was replaced by José María Plá on 15 February 1856.
