= Luis Alberto Lacalle =

36th President of Uruguay (1990–1995)

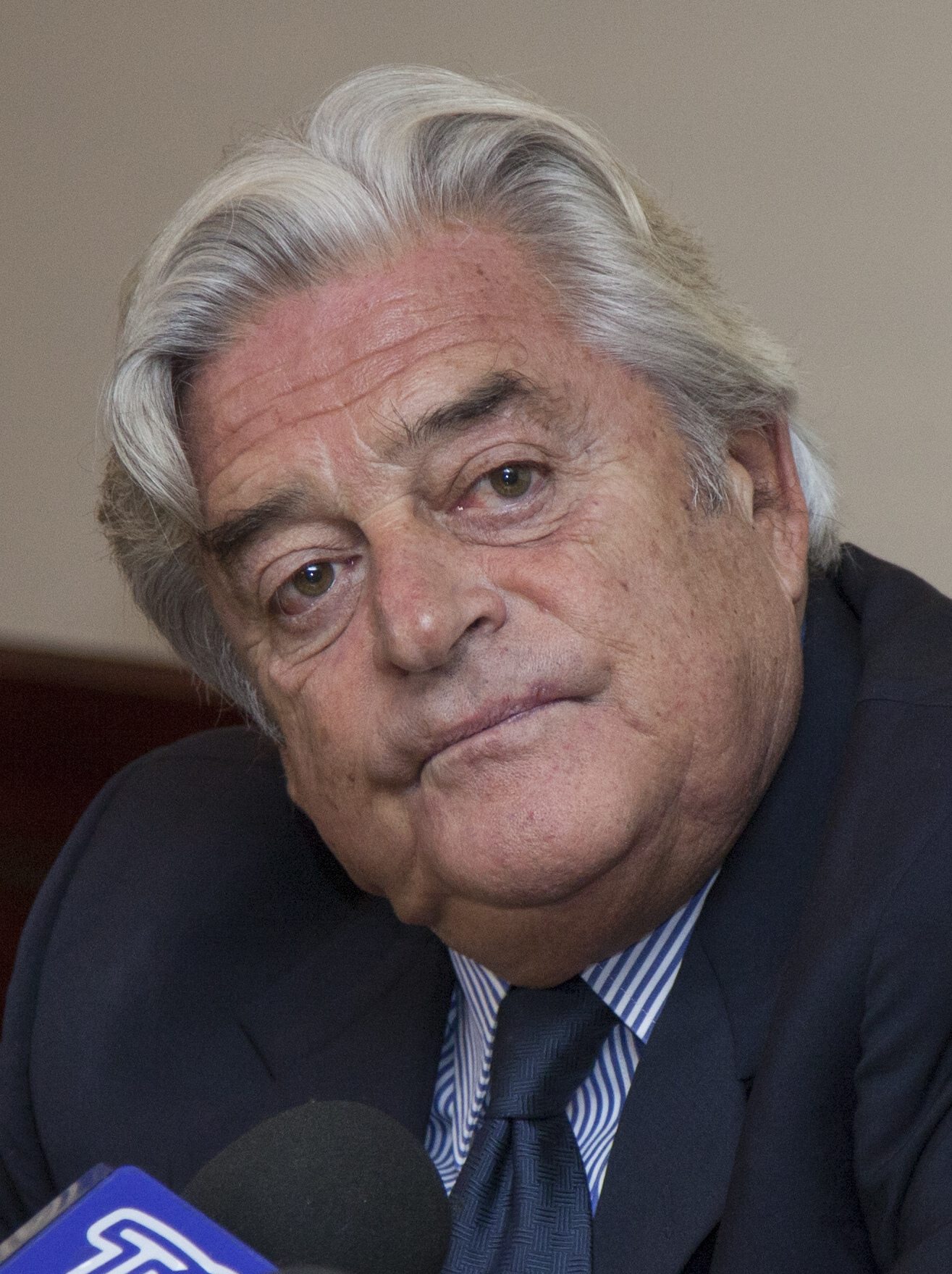
- Lacalle in 2014

36th President of Uruguay
- In office 1 March 1990 – 1 March 1995
- Vice President: Gonzalo Aguirre
- Preceded by: Julio María Sanguinetti
- Succeeded by: Julio María Sanguinetti

Senator of Uruguay
- In office 15 February 2010 – 15 February 2015
- Constituency: At-large
- In office 15 February 1985 – 15 February 1990
- Constituency: At-large

Chair of the National Party
- In office 17 August 2009 – 8 January 2011
- Preceded by: Carlos Julio Pereyra
- Succeeded by: Luis Alberto Heber
- In office 11 April 1999 – 13 July 2004
- Preceded by: Alberto Volonté
- Succeeded by: Jorge Larrañaga

Representative of Uruguay
- In office 15 February 1972 – 27 June 1973
- Constituency: Montevideo

Personal details
- Born: Luis Alberto Lacalle de Herrera; 13 July 1941 (age 85) Montevideo, Uruguay
- Party: National Party
- Spouse: Julia Pou (m. 1970)
- Relations: Luis Alberto de Herrera (Maternal Grandfather); Margarita Uriarte (Maternal Grandmother)
- Children: 4, including Luis Lacalle
- Parents: Carlos Pedro Lacalle Nuñez (Father); Maria Hortensia de Herrera Uriarte (Mother)
- Education: University of the Republic
- Occupation: Politician
- Profession: Lawyer

Luis Alberto Lacalle de Herrera (Spanish pronunciation: [ˈlwis alˈβeɾto laˈkaʝe ðe eˈreɾa]; Lacalle locally [laˈkaʒe] or [laˈkaʃe]; born 13 July 1941) is a Uruguayan politician and lawyer who served as the 36th president of Uruguay from 1990 to 1995. A member of the National Party, he previously served as National Representative from 1972 to 1973, and as Senator of the Republic from 1985 to 1990.

Lacalle was born and raised in Montevideo. He is the grandson of Luis Alberto de Herrera who led the National Party and founded one of its most prominent sectors. He attended the Jesuit Colegio Seminario and graduated from the University of the Republic in 1964 with a law degree. In his youth he worked as a journalist in some media outlets. From 1972 to 1973 he served as National Representative for the Montevideo Department, but lost his seat after the dissolution of parliament with the coup d'état carried out by President Juan María Bordaberry.

Lacalle was elected president in the 1989 election, which marked only the third time since 1860 that his party had won a national election. It had last led the government when it formed a majority on the National Council of Government from 1959 to 1967, and last held the presidency via Bernardo Prudencio Berro from 1860 to 1865. His presidency was characterized by a liberal economic policy in line with the Washington Consensus. He carried out a fiscal adjustment and a reform to state-owned companies to deregulate them. This earned him opposition from the left and the union movement. In foreign policy, the Lacalle government signed the Treaty of Asunción that established the Southern Common Market (MERCOSUR).

After leaving office in 1995, Lacalle continued in active politics. In 1999 he ran for president again, finishing in third place. In 2004 he ran in the National Party presidential primaries, but was defeated by Jorge Larrañaga, who was the party's candidate in the general election. In 2009 he was a presidential candidate again but was defeated in the second round by the Broad Front nominee, José Mujica, who was elected president. With the victory of his son, Luis Lacalle Pou, in the 2019 general election, the two became the third father–son pair to serve as the nation's president.

== Early life and education ==
Lacalle in was born in Montevideo on 13 July 1941, the son of Carlos Pedro Lacalle Nuñez and María Hortensia de Herrera de Lacalle. He is of Basque and Spanish descent. His mother was the daughter of Luis Alberto de Herrera, a prominent politician of the National Party.

He attended Colegio Seminario and joined the National Party at the age of 17. He graduated from the University of the Republic's law school in 1964.

== Early political career (1958–1972) ==
Lacalle endorsed his grandfather Luis Alberto de Herrera in the 1958 election, in which the National Party obtained a historic victory after 93 years in the opposition and became the ruling political group in the National Council of Government.

In 1961 he started working as a journalist for Clarín, writing articles and columns. In the 1971 election, he was elected National Representative for the Montevideo Department and kept his seat until the 1973 coup, when President Juan María Bordaberry dissolved parliament.

== Opposition to the dictatorship (1973–1985) ==
Lacalle was an opponent of the civil-military dictatorship and was imprisoned for several weeks. When he was released he was part of the clandestine opposition to the regime.

In August 1978, Lacalle was sent three bottles of wine tainted with poison addressed to himself and two fellow National Party members (Mario Heber and Carlos Julio Pereyra) who had been trying to negotiate a way out of the military regime. Lacalle's wife warned him against the suspicious gift, but Heber's wife drank a glass, dying immediately. The case remains unsolved.

He campaigned for the "NO" option in the 1980 constitutional referendum. In 1981, within the framework of the campaign for the 1982 primary elections in which there was a greater democratic opening, Lacalle founded the Congreso Nacional Herrerista (lit. 'National Herrerista Council'), a sector within the National Party. In the 1984 general election that ended the dictatorship, he endorsed Alberto Zumarán for president, who was defeated by Julio María Sanguinetti. However, Lacalle was elected Senator of the Republic.

== National leadership (1985–1990) ==
Following the 1984 election, Lacalle served as Senator of the Republic in the 42nd Legislature. In 1987 he was appointed vice president of the Senate. In this period he increased his political profile and began to be compared to John F. Kennedy.

== Presidency (1990–1995) ==
=== 1989 election ===
In 1989 he ran for the presidency for his faction, Herrerismo, with Gonzalo Aguirre as his running-mate. In the 1989 general election, governed by the Ley de Lemas system, Lacalle received the most votes of any presidential candidate, while his party was the most voted political group. Under the Ley de Lemas system, the highest finishing candidate of the most-voted party was elected president.

He took office on 1 March 1990 for a five-year term. He formed a coalition with some factions of the Colorado Party, called Coincidencia Nacional (lit. 'National Coincidence').

=== Tenure ===
Upon taking office, Lacalle sent parliament a tax reform bill which was immediately passed with the support of the Colorado Party. Sales tax were increased from 21% to 22% income tax was increased and a few other taxes were created. During his rule, he encouraged a free market program, participated in the Brady bonds plan to alleviate foreign debt obligations, and was a co-founder of the Mercosur, along with the presidents of Paraguay, Brazil, and Argentina, which came into effect with the Treaty of Asunción in 1991.

In 1992, support for his economic reforms suffered a heavy blow when one of his most significant initiatives, a plan to privatize Uruguay's state-owned companies, was rejected by referendum.

In the 1994 national elections, he selected his Interior Minister, Juan Andrés Ramírez to be the presidential candidate of the Herrerismo faction. The National Party narrowly lost the elections to the Colorado Party.

Among several prominent politicians who took part in his government are Héctor Gros Espiell, Sergio Abreu, Juan Andrés Ramírez, Carlos Cat and Ignacio de Posadas.

== Later runs for the presidency ==
In 1999, he won his party's primary elections against Juan Andrés Ramírez (who had split from the Herrerismo) and several other candidates, and was a candidate for presidency again. However, a string of accusations about corruption in his government damaged his chances. Ramírez's departure from active politics after losing the primary was the final blow, and Lacalle came in third place with 22.3% of the votes in the general elections.

Lacalle ran again for president in the 2004 elections, but the other party leaders had gathered around a single opposing candidate, Jorge Larrañaga, who defeated him in the primaries by a 2-to-1 margin. In 2009, he ran for the presidency again, this time defeating Jorge Larrañaga in the June primaries. By winning the primary election, he became head of the governing board of the party. He lost the presidential elections to José Mujica in a run-off election in November.

Lacalle is a member of the Club de Madrid. and he is member of the board of the Public Affairs Committee of the Jerusalem Summit.

== Personal life ==
Lacalle is married to María Julia Pou Brito del Pino (born 1946); they have four children, Pilar Lacalle Pou, President Luis Lacalle Pou, economist Juan José Lacalle Pou and Manuel Lacalle Pou. Luis Alberto Lacalle Pou was the 2014 presidential candidate of the National Party and once again in 2019. On both occasions, he entered the second round but in 2019 he won, and became president elect of Uruguay, for the 2020–2025 term.

== Honors ==
- Israel: Honorary degree, Hebrew University of Jerusalem
- Mexico: Honorary degree, Autonomous University of Guadalajara
- Paraguay: Honorary degree, National University of Asunción
- Spain: Honorary degree, Complutense University of Madrid

=== Foreign honors ===
- Spain: Collars of the Order of Isabella the Catholic

== See also ==
- Politics of Uruguay
- List of political families#Uruguay

Political offices
Preceded by Julio María Sanguinetti	President of Uruguay; 1990–1995	Succeeded by Julio María Sanguinetti
