= José María Plá =

Uruguayan politician (1794-1869)

José María Plá Machado (Maldonado Department, 15 October 1794 - Montevideo, 23 April 1869) was a Uruguayan politician who briefly served as interim President of Uruguay in 1856.
