= Isabelino Canaveris =

Uruguayan patriot, military revolutionary and politician

Comandante Isabelino Canaveris
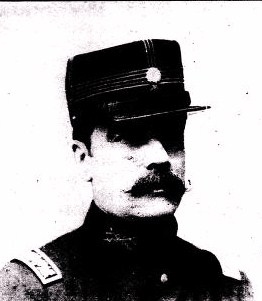
- Lt. Colonel. Isabelino Canaveris

Personal details
- Born: Isabelino Canaveris Farias; July 8, 1852 Montevideo, Uruguay
- Died: c.1915 (aged 62–63) Buenos Aires, Argentina
- Party: Partido Nacional
- Spouse: Enriqueta Trillo
- Relatives: Francisco Farías (grandfather); Guillermo Brown Blanco (cousin)
- Occupation: army politician revolutionary caudillo
- Profession: military man
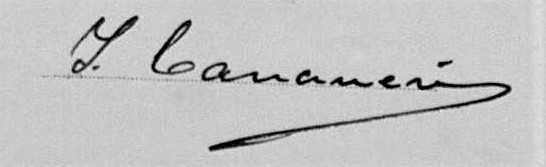
- Signature

Military service
- Allegiance: Blancos; Federales
- Branch/service: Ejército Blanco
- Years of service: 1865-1897
- Rank: Lieutenant colonel
- Battles/wars: Asalto al Fuerte de San José; Batalla de Paso Severino; Rebelión Jordanista; Toma de Mercedes; Batalla de la Unión; Batalla de Sauce; Batalla de Corralito; Batalla de Manantiales; Batalla de Guayabos; Batalla del Quebracho; Batalla de los Tres Árboles

Isabelino Canaveris (1852 – c. 1915) was an Uruguayan patriot, military, revolutionary and politician, who served as president of the National Party in the Argentine Republic. He participated in most of the armed confrontations between the Blancos and Colorados.

He served under the command of Generals Timoteo Aparicio and Aparicio Saravia, taking an active part during the actions produced during the Revolución de 1870 and Revolución de 1897 against the governments of Lorenzo Batlle and Juan Idiarte Borda. He also served in the Orientals forces that supported the cause of Ricardo López Jordán in the Entre Ríos Province, participating in the Battle of Sauce, against the National troops under the command of General Emilio Conesa.

== Military career ==
Shield of the National Party

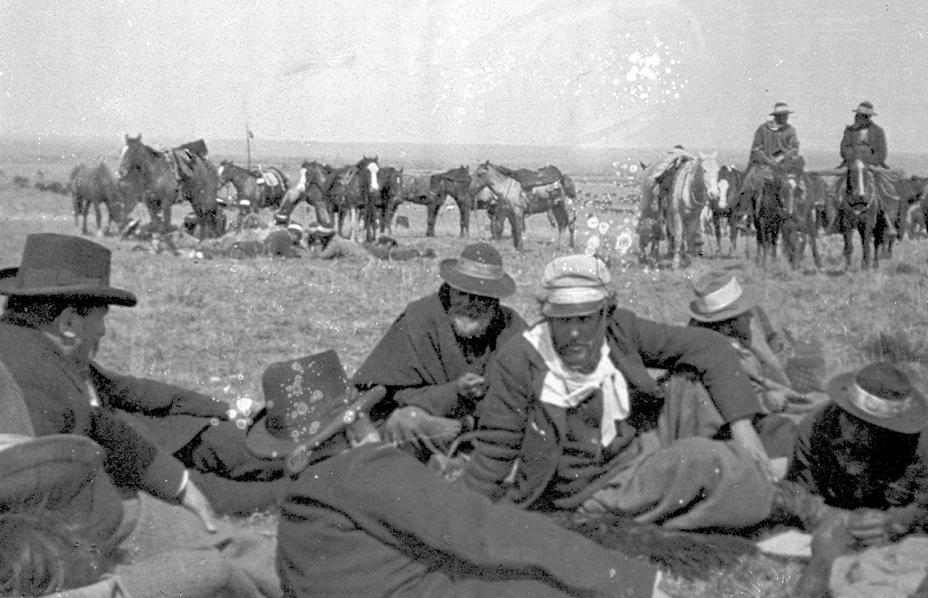
Revolutionary leaders of the White Party, during the conflict of 1897

Canaveris was born on July 8, 1852, in Montevideo, son of Sinforoso Camilo Canaveris and Rosa Farias Zubillaga, belonging to a family from Buenos Aires and Montevideo, related to the Federal and National Party. He began his career in 1865 as a volunteer soldier, in the Batallón de Infantería de Guardias Nacionales de Extramuros. Three years later, he was promoted to Sub-Lieutenant, taking active participation in the revolution of Bernardo Berro, occurred on February 19, 1868.

In 1870, Canaveris joined the oriental forces that took part in the Jordanist Rebellion, the last conflict between Unitarians and Federals, occurred in the provinces of Entre Ríos and Corrientes. He served in support of the López Jordán troops under the command of Anacleto Medina against the National Government forces commanded by Emilio Mitre. That same year he served under Timoteo Aparicio in the Revolution of the Lances against the government of Lorenzo Batlle.

In August 1871, Canaveris was promoted to the rank of captain, later promoted as sergeant major in 1875, and March 20, 1886, he reached the rank of lieutenant colonel, during the Revolución del Quebracho.

Canaveris took part in most civil clashes between Blancos and Colorados, including the Revolución tricolor, Batalla de Paso Severino, Batalla de Corralito, Batalla de Sauce, Batalla de Manantiales and Batalla de los tres Árboles, conflict where served as escort of Colonel Diego Lamas.

Like many of his comrades he was persecuted by his opponents, having to go into exile in Buenos Aires towards the end of 1880. He did not take part in the last Uruguayan civil conflict (Revolución de 1904), due to disagreements with the leader of the Blanco party José María Pampillón. He had established about thirteen political clubs in the city of Buenos Aires, with more than 5,000 affiliate partners.

Retired from political life he was dedicated to the management of the Sociedad Territorial La Plata, a company dedicated to selling land in monthly installments, through public auctions. He wrote some articles about of the exhibition of woolly animals of the Argentine Rural Society, and also served as a commission agent. His office was located on Calle Esmeralda No. 173 in front of the Congregación Evangélica Alemana, a Lutheran temple located in the San Nicolás neighborhood.

Isabelino Canaveris officiated at the funeral ceremonies of distinguished co-religionists of the National Party, including Tomás Butler, a relative of Carlos Butler, who was killed for political issues in Montevideo. In 1909, he participated in the senses tributes to General Guillermo García, a distinguished politician of the National Party.

He also took part in the tributes made in Buenos Aires for the death of former President Carlos Pellegrini (July 17, 1906).

== Ancestors and family ==
Isabelino Canaveris belonged to a family of military traditions, separated by political disputes between Federales Loyalists to Rosas, Federales supporters of Balcarce, and Unitarians exiled in Montevideo. His father was a former federal military who participated in the Siege of Montevideo, under the command of General Antonio F. Díaz and Colonel Joaquín Ramiro. His father made his military career in the Batallón de Voluntarios Rebajados of Buenos Aires, a military unit at the service of Rosas, formed with veterans of the War of Brazil and the Campaigns to the Desert of 1830s.

It is possible the paternal ancestors of Isabelino Canaveris have served in the regiments of Savoy or Hibernia. He was the grandson of Manuel Canaveris, a lieutenant of the Regimiento N° 4 de Infantería and Regimiento de Patricios, who participated as a volunteer of the militias in the defense and reconquest of Buenos Aires during the English Invasions of 1806 and 1807.

In 1903, he was honored by a group of co-religionists in the Società Unione Operai Italiani, the main club of the Italian community in Buenos Aires.

Isabelino Canaveris was married to Enriqueta Trillo, born in Entre Ríos, daughter of Dionisio Trillo and Carmen Aguiar, belonging to a distinguished family. He and his wife were the parents of María Esther, Isabelino Manuel, Ernesto Pablo, Julio, Enriqueta, Alfredo and Bernardo Sixto Canaveris. In Buenos Aires, Canaveris and his family lived for several years in a house located in the neighborhood of San Telmo. His property, a luxurious house located on calle Chile No. 767 had been leased by Isabelino Canaveris to the English Alejandro Witcomb.

His son, Julio D. Canaveris did his elementary studies in the Colegio del Salvador, and obtained a doctorate in the Faculty of Medicine of the University of Buenos Aires in 1907. His thesis "Coqueluche" was sponsored by Patricio Fleming, a well-known Argentine pediatrician. His work is mentioned in the Index-catalogue of the Library of the Surgeon General's Office of the United States National Library of Medicine of 1959.

Isabelino Canaveris was nephew of José Brito del Pino, a distinguished military and politician who participated in the founding of the White Party in the Banda Oriental. He is also directly or indirectly linked to the families of Bernardo Berro, President of Uruguay between 1860 and 1864. His granddaughter Blanca Canaveris, was married to Saturnino Soriano, directly related to families of Benito Nazar, Francisco Reynolds and Richard Blake Newton. His other granddaughter María Laura Canaveris, was the wife of Luis Teodoro Serantes, a descendant of Ambrosio de Lezica. His descendants also are directly linked to the families Bradley, Basavilbaso-Ross and Zavaleta-Riglos.

His wife was the goddaughter of Mercedes Delgado and Diego Eugenio Lamas, a distinguished military and politician from the Partido Nacional who participated in the Guerra Grande.
