= Battle of Sauce (1870) =

Battle in the Revolution of the Lances

- Part of Revolution of the Lances
Date	December 25, 1870
Location	Uruguay
Result	Victory of Government troops

Belligerents
Partido Nacional	Gobierno Colorado

Commanders and leaders
Timoteo Aparicio; Anacleto Medina; Agustín Urtubey; Benjamín Villasboas; Belisario Estomba; Rafael Lasala; Isabelino Canaveris	Lorenzo Batlle y Grau; José Gregorio Suárez; Francisco Caraballo; Máximo Santos; Máximo Pérez; Simón Martinez

Units involved
Ejército Blanco	Ejército Gubernamental

Strength
5,000	5,000

Battle of Sauce was a Uruguayan battle between the Blancos army under the command of Timoteo Aparicio, and the Colorado government troops, under Colonel José Gregorio Suárez. It occurred on the banks of the Arroyo del Sauce, Canelones Department, during the Revolution of the Lances.

== History ==
This bloody battle fought on May 25, 1870 concluded with a victory for the government army of General Suárez, who ordered to mercilessly execute a large number of prisoners of the White Army. Among the government troops was Máximo Santos, future Uruguayan president for the Colorado party.

In the ranks of Timoteo Aparicio, took part prestigious revolutionaries of the Uruguayan National Party, including the veteran Anacleto Medina, and the young man Isabelino Canaveris, a patriot who also participated in the Revolución of 1897.
