= Toma de Mercedes =

- Part of Uruguayan Civil War
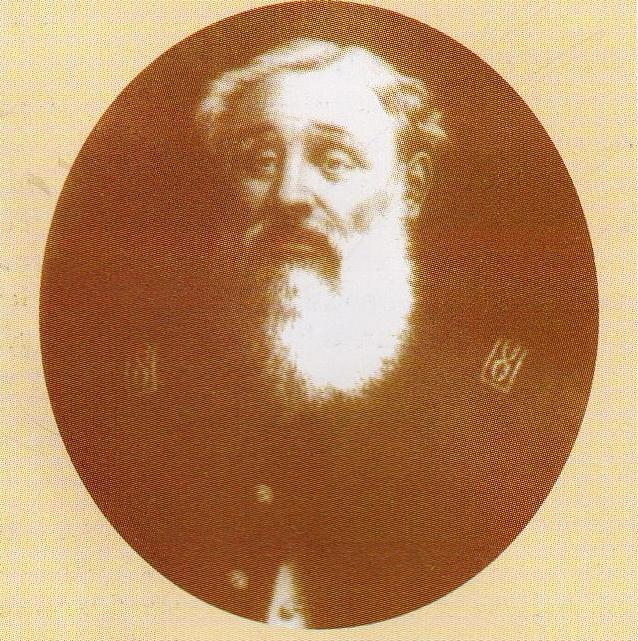
- Timoteo Aparicio
Date	August 25, 1870
Location	Mercedes, Uruguay

Belligerents
Partido Nacional	Gobierno Colorado

Commanders and leaders
Timoteo Aparicio; Anacleto Medina; Gerónimo Amilivia; Isabelino Canaveris	Lorenzo Batlle y Grau; Juan Idiarte Borda; Pablo Galarza; Carlos Gaudencio

Units involved
Ejército Blanco	Ejército Gubernamental

Toma de Mercedes was the takeover of the city of Mercedes, Uruguay by the Ejército Blanco under the command of Timoteo Aparicio on August 25, 1870, during the Revolution of the Lances in the Banda Oriental.

Prominent Blancos officers including Anacleto Medina and Gerónimo Amilivia served in the revolutionary army. Among the leaders of the Colorado party who took part in the defense of the city was Juan Idiarte Borda, future Uruguayan president.
