= Enrique Castro (general) =

Uruguayan general (1817–1888)

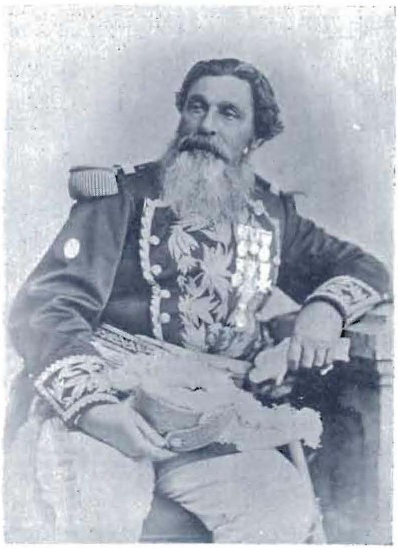
- Born: 1817; Pueblo Barceló, Florida, Río de la Plata
- Died: 1888 (aged 70–71); Montevideo, Montevideo Department, Uruguay
- Military career
- Allegiance: Colorados; Argentine Confederation; Uruguay; Blancos
- Branch: Argentine Army; National Army of Uruguay
- Service years: 1836 – 1888
- Rank: General
- Conflicts: Uruguayan Civil War; Argentine Civil Wars; Battle of Caseros; Battle of Cepeda; Battle of Pavón; Paraguayan War; Humaitá campaign; Battle of Yatay; Revolution of the Lances; Battle of Manantiales; Quebracho Revolution

Enrique Castro (c. 1817 – 1888) was an Uruguayan general who served the Colorados throughout the 19th century. He participated in the Argentine Civil Wars, the Uruguayan Civil War and the Paraguayan War and was known for organizing and starting the Quebracho Revolution.

== Biography ==
Castro was born about 1817 at the military camp of Pueblo Barceló as the son of Mateo Castro. He accompanied Fructuoso Rivera in his uprising of 1836 and participated in the fight against the invasion of Pascual Echagüe, in which he was seriously injured.

In 1846, Castro was pierced by a spear but Timoteo Aparicio managed to save his life due to their personal friendship. Castro remained a prisoner of the Blancos and was sent to Entre Ríos where he joined the ranks of Justo José de Urquiza.

He returned temporarily in 1851 during Urquiza's campaign against Manuel Oribe and participated in the Battle of Caseros and the battles of Cepeda and Pavón, reaching the rank of colonel in the Argentine Army.

When Venancio Flores began an uprising against President Bernardo Prudencio Berro on 1863, he invaded the country at the head of 250 men and was appointed Chief of Staff of the rebels. After the success of the rebellion, he was the political chief of Salto and later participated in the Paraguayan War, where he obtained the rank of general. Castro was made General Commander of the Campaign on 1870, replacing José Gregorio Suárez. He later had to fight the Revolution of the Lances led by Timoteo Aparicio and was victorious in the Battle of Manantiales.

He supported the election of Lorenzo Latorre and he was appointed commander of the troops located south of the Negro River but his discrepancies with the dictator Máximo Santos separated him and he marched to Buenos Aires where he collaborated with the preparations for the Quebracho Revolution. He was appointed general in chief, together with his Blanco colleague, José Miguel Arredondo and invaded the country on March 28, 1886. Defeated, he went into exile to Argentina but returned when the Reconciliation Cabinet was formed, and regained his position as general.
