= José Gregorio Suárez =

Uruguayan Colorado general (1813–1879)

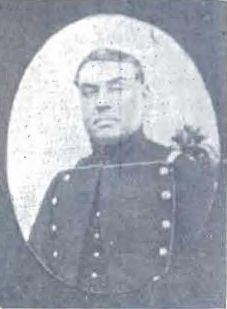
- Born: 1813; Tres Cruces, Montevideo Department, Río de la Plata
- Died: December 7, 1879 (aged 65–66); Montevideo, Montevideo Department, Uruguay
- Military career
- Allegiance: Colorados; Uruguay
- Branch: National Army of Uruguay
- Service years: 1839 – 1879
- Rank: Lieutenant Colonel
- Conflicts: Uruguayan Civil War; Battle of Arroyo Grande; Battle of India Muerta; Revolution of 1858; Liberation Crusade of 1863; Battle of Pedernal; Uruguayan War; Siege of Paysandú; Paraguayan War; Humaitá campaign; Battle of Estero Bellaco; Revolution of the Lances; Battle of Paso Severino; Battle of Sauce; Battle of Manantiales

José Gregorio Suárez Moreira (1813–1879) was a Uruguayan lieutenant colonel and politician who participated in the Uruguayan Civil War, the Paraguayan War and other conflicts throughout the 19th century. He was known for his service during the Battle of Pedernal and the Battle of Estero Bellaco.

== Youth and the Uruguayan Civil War ==
He was the son of Argentine parents José Suárez and Damasia Moreira and as a young man, he was a commercial employee. He later worked as a herdsman, raised capital and set up shop in the Tacuarembo Department. In 1839, his business was destroyed by the invading forces of Pascual Echagüe and he was taken prisoner, an incident that determined his strong allegiance to the Colorados and the hatred of him by the Blanco Party and the Federalist Party. During the Uruguayan Civil War, he joined the forces of Fructuoso Rivera. He fought in the battles of Arroyo Grande and India Muerta but had to take refuge in Brazil. During the conflict, his mother was locked up in her ranch by Blanco troops who then set it on fire however there is no other proof of this other than accounts from Suárez himself, who narrated it to Venancio Flores and the Marquis of Tamandaré after the executions that followed the Siege of Paysandú. He acquired prestige as a courageous and skillful leader and military man, and in 1847 he was Lieutenant Colonel of the National Army of Uruguay.

== Rise of his military career ==
After the Uruguayan Civil War, he returned to his business and on November 16, 1853, he founded the town of San Gregorio de Polanco. In 1854. Flores was appointed interim political chief of Tacuarembó but, in 1857, under the administration of Gabriel Antonio Pereira, he was accused of electoral fraud and had to take refuge in Brazil again. In 1858, he aligned with Trifón Ordóñez and Eufrasio Bálsamo and joined the Revolution of 1858 led by César Díaz although, after the Hecatombe de Quinteros, he had to return to exile.

Although he never forgave Flores for staying out of that attempt, he rose with him in the Liberation Crusade of 1863 against the government of Bernardo Berro. He collided with the Blanco leader Timoteo Aparicio in the Battle of Pedernal and famously held a personal spear encounter with him, in which he was seriously injured. He spent a few months in Brazil recovering, and rejoined the rebels shortly before the Siege of Paysandú, in which, by his own admission, he gave the order to shoot Leandro Gómez and his closest collaborators which angered Flores and the Marquis of Tamandaré. After the triumph of Flores, he was promoted to general on June 14, 1865. He then participated in the War of the Triple Alliance against Paraguay, standing out in the Battle of Estero Bellaco but ill with malaria, he returned to Uruguay in 1866.

== Political career ==
Turning into a character of political influence, he aspired to the President of Uruguau and became a fierce enemy of Flores. He was accused of being the mastermind behind the Conspiracy de la Mina which was an attempt to kill Flores and Suárez was arrested at Montevideo. According to Colorado historian José María Fernández Saldaña, he was preparing an armed movement against Flores when on February 19, 1868, an unsuccessful attempt by the Blancos to seize power occurred resulted in the deaths of Flores and Bernardo Berro. Although the prevailing opinion at the time was that Flores' murder was the work of the Blancos, the caudillo's family, and in particular his widow, attributed the crime to Suárez.

In 1868 he lost the Presidency of the Republic in parliament to Lorenzo Batlle by just one vote, and on March 2 he became Minister of War and Navy. He refused to repress the uprising of the Colorado caudillo Francisco Caraballo, with whom he came to fraternize, but instead he fought the Revolution of the Lances against his old enemy Timoteo Aparicio, as commander of the Army of the South. He fought in the Battle of Paso Severino and staged a spectacular retreat when he was surrounded by enemy forces at Maldonado on December 22, 1870. He triumphed in the Battle of Sauce culminating in the slaughter of the prisoners, a fact denounced by his own secretary, Carlos María Ramírez, who called him "Goyo Sangre". Afterwards, he persecuted the revolutionaries after their defeat in the Battle of Manantiales.

== Later years and death ==
He initially supported the coup of January 1875 but Lorenzo Latorre distrusted Suárez and isolated him completely, while at the same time he had his main collaborators meticulously assassinated such as Lucas Bergara, Fermín Bertrán, Felipe Fresnesdoso and others. He died abruptly on December 7, 1879, at his home and it was widely reported at the time that Latorre had him assassinated. Suárez was a man of strong complexion, with a wide and pockmarked face, with a large mouth and thick lips that generated his nickname "Goyo Jeta".

== See also ==
- Siege of Paysandú
- San Gregorio de Polanco
- Revolution of the Lances
- Timoteo Aparicio
