= Battle of Sauce (Entre Ríos) =

- Part of Argentine Civil War
| Date | May 20, 1870 |
| Location | Nogoyá, Entre Ríos, Argentina |
| Result | Argentine Army victory |

Belligerents
| (Argentina) Argentine Army | Federal Army; Blanco Army |

Commanders and leaders
| Emilio Conesa; Joaquín Viejobueno; Leopoldo Nelson; Nicolás Levalle | Ricardo López Jordán; Simón Luengo; Anacleto Medina; Isabelino Canaveris |

Strength
| 3,960 | 9,000 |

Casualties and losses
| 150 | ? |

Battle of Sauce (Combate del Sauce) was a battle between the troops of the Argentine National government, and the Federal rebels commanded by Ricardo López Jordán. It took place on May 20, 1870, in the Arroyo del Sauce, Entre Ríos.

== History ==
It took place during the Jordanian Rebellion against the National Government, being the first battle in which the Argentine army used machine guns. The revolutionary forces had the support of the Army of the Uruguayan National Party under Colonel Anacleto Medina.

The military actions took place on the morning of May 20, 1870 in the Arroyo del Sauce, when López Jordán's cavalry attacked the infantry under the command of General Emilio Canesa, causing hundreds of casualties in the ranks of the Argentine army. In the absence of weapons, and after three hours of combat, the Montoneras of López Jordán left the battlefield, causing a large number of deaths and injuries among Conesa's troops.

This battle counted with the participation of prominent caudillos and military, like Isabelino Canaveris, who served as a lieutenant in the ranks of López Jordan. Among the ranks of the Argentine army were Joaquín Viejobueno and Leopoldo Nelson, long-standing military in the service of the army.
