= Chilavert (disambiguation) =

Chilavert may refer to:

- Martiniano Chilavert (1798–1852), Argentine military officer
- José Luis Chilavert (born 1965), Paraguayan footballer
- Rolando Chilavert (born 1961), Paraguayan footballer
- Chilavert, Buenos Aires, neighborhood in Buenos Aires, Argentina
- Cooperativa Chilavert Artes Gráficas a prominent "recovered factory" in Buenos Aires, Argentina
