= José Brito =

José Brito may refer to:

- José Brito (Cape Verdean politician)
- José Brito (Venezuelan politician)
- José Brito del Pino, Uruguayan soldier and patriot
