= José Brito del Pino =

Uruguayan soldier and patriot (1797–1877)

General José Brito del Pino
- General José Brito del Pino

Personal details
- Born: José Esteban de los Reyes Brito del Pino y Ramery; 6 January 1797 Montevideo, Viceroyalty of the Río de la Plata, Spanish Empire
- Died: 27 April 1877 (aged 80) Montevideo, Uruguay
- Party: National Party (funsionist)
- Spouse: María Farías Zubillaga
- Relations: Joaquín del Pino (grandfather); Juana del Pino (aunt)
- Occupation: politician army
- Profession: Army officer

Military service
- Allegiance: (Argentina) United Provinces of South America; Blancos (until 1851); República Oriental del Uruguay
- Rank: General
- Battles/wars: Argentine War of Independence; Cisplatine War; Uruguayan Civil War

José Brito del Pino (6 January 1797 – 27 April 1877) was a Uruguayan soldier and patriot, who participated in the Argentine War of Independence, the Cisplatine War and the Uruguayan Civil War. He was one of the founding members of the Partido Nacional Uruguayo.

== Biography ==
He was born in Montevideo, Banda Oriental, the son of José Pérez Brito, born in Galicia, and Josefa del Pino, a noble woman, daughter of Viceroy Joaquín del Pino and Ignacia Ramery. After completing his elementary studies he enlisted in the army, serving since 1825 as an assistant in the Estado Mayor del Ejército, and taking part in the Cisplatine War against the troops of Brazilian emperor Pedro I.

He was promoted to colonel during the presidency of General Manuel Oribe, and also appointed to hold the position of Ministry of Government. He served as chief of the Ministry of War during the Gobierno del Cerrito. After the capitulation of Oribe to General Justo José de Urquiza, he was appointed by President Joaquín Suárez to hold the position of minister of War in 1852.

He participated in all the political events that occurred in Uruguay during and after the Guerra Grande, including serious events during the presidency of Gabriel Antonio Pereira. He was the author of Diario de la guerra del Brasil, a work about his experiences during the Cisplatine War.

José Brito del Pino belonged to a moderate sector of the Blanco Party, a supporter of the Union of that party with the Colorado Party. He served under General Fructuoso Rivera during the war against the Empire of Brazil, taking an active part in the Battle of Rincón against the troops of José Luís Mena Barreto's father.

== Family ==
José Brito del Pino was married to María Farías Zubillaga, daughter Francisco Higinio Farias and Josefa Juliana Zubillaga, belonging to a distinguished family. He and his wife were parents of four sons, Eduardo Brito del Pino (attorney), Josefa, Federico Brito del Pino, husband Amanda Berro, daughter of Bernardo Berro, and Darío Brito del Pino, politician, member of the Blanco Party.

His family was linked to the family of Isabelino Canaveris Farias, prominent Uruguayan patriot, who had an active participation in the civil wars.
