= Anacleto Medina =

General Anacleto Medina
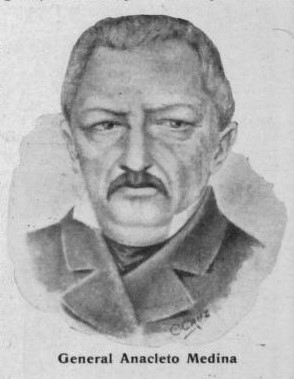

Personal details
- Born: 1788 Colonia, Uruguay
- Died: July 17, 1871 (aged 82–83) Manantiales de San Juan, Colonia, Uruguay
- Occupation: Army; Caudillo; Revolutionary; Politician
- Profession: Military man

Military service
- Allegiance: Ejército Federal; Unitarian Army; Ejército Colorado; Ejército Blanco
- Years of service: 1820–1871
- Rank: Brigadier General
- Battles/wars: Battle of Cepeda; Martín Rodríguez campaigns Battle of Camacuã; Battle of Ituzaingó; Battle of the Vizcacheras; Battle of Carpintería; Battle of Cagancha; Battle of Caaguazú; Battle of Arroyo Grande; Battle of Caseros; Battle of Sauce; Battle of Paso Severino; Battle of Manantiales

Anacleto Medina (1788 – July 17, 1871) was a Uruguayan soldier, politician and caudillo who participated in the Brazilian War, the Argentine Civil War and the Guerra Grande in the Banda Oriental. He served in the Federal Army in the Unitary Army, and also in the Colorados and Blancos armies, during the Uruguayan Civil War.

Born in Las Víboras, Colonia Department, Uruguay, he was the son of Luis Bernardo Medina, born in Santiago del Estero, Argentina, and Petrona Biera, belonging to a Creole family from the Banda Oriental.

During his military career he was under the command of the main military leaders, including Francisco Ramírez, Juan Lavalle, Fructuoso Rivera, Justo José de Urquiza and Ricardo López Jordán. He died assassinated after the defeat of Manantiales, event occurred on July 17, 1871.
