= Battle of Pehuajó =

- Part of the Corrientes campaign
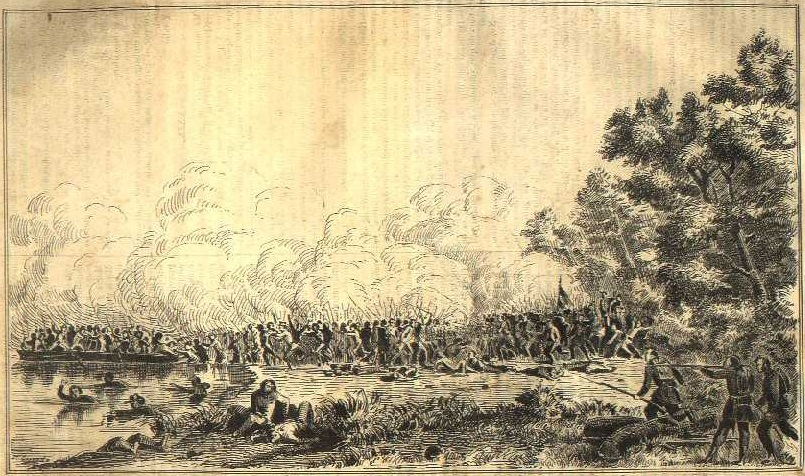
Date	31 January 1866
Location	Corrientes Province, Argentina.
Result	Paraguayan victory

Belligerents
Paraguay	Argentina; Uruguay

Commanders and leaders
Isidoro Resquín; Celestino Prieto	Emilio Conesa

Strength
1,500	2,000

Casualties and losses
609: 200 killed 400 wounded 9 captured	402: 88 killed 314 wounded

The Battle of Pehuajó, also known as Battle of Corrales or Battle of Itati, was fought during the Paraguayan War on 31 January 1866.

Around 1,500 Paraguayan troops commanded by general Francisco Isidoro Resquín and lieutenant Celestino Prieto engaged in a surprise attack against a couple of advanced Argentine and Uruguayan battalions with about 2,000 men led by general Emilio Conesa, under direct command of the president of Argentina, Bartolomé Mitre.

== Previous events ==
After the Brazilian siege and bombing of Paysandú (December 1864 - January 1865) Paraguay declared war on Brazil because of the Treaty both Brazil and Paraguay signed for "defending the Uruguayan independence" (though the validity of that treaty is still controversial) and for protecting the allied Uruguayan blanco government. After a victorious, but later abandoned campaign in Mato Grosso, the troops of Paraguayan president and field marshal Francisco Solano López were intending to reach Uruguay through the Entre Ríos province of Argentina. While president Mitre was secretly giving military support to the coup in Uruguay and allowing the Imperial Brazilian Navy and troops to pass through Argentine territory, he denied access to the Paraguayan Army, this led to the declaration of war from Paraguay to Argentina and the later Corrientes campaign.

After several defeats of the Paraguayan Army in Corrientes (where general Wenceslao Robles refused to accomplish López's orders and advanced until dangerous positions very far from supply lines) and in Uruguaiana (where general Antonio de la Cruz Estigarribia by his own will entered in a trap, surrendering with 10,000 men), the Paraguayans had to retreat from Argentina after fierce battles with general Wenceslao Paunero and his men.

Solano López declared Antonio de la Cruz Estigarribia a "traitor" and "spy of the enemies" (later, Estigarribia joined the infamous Paraguayan Legion) and replaced Wenceslao Robles for his well trusted general Resquín.

== The battle ==
Paraguayan troops retreated to their own territory, protected by the Fortress of Itapirú. General Conesa, leader of the advanced allied forces, tried to chase the fleeing soldiers, but the attempt was very risky and allowed the Paraguayans to have good counter-attacking possibilities. Solano López understood this and sent small raiding parties of 100-200 men across the river to attack allied posts. Most notable were raid on 13, 16, 17, 19 and 25 January. On 29 January 1866, 400 Paraguayans crossed the River Paraná and drove the Argentines from Corrales (in the Argentine town of Paso de la Patria).

President Mitre ordered Conesa to recapture Corrales. Yet, on the 31st, president López sent another force of 1,200 men under the overall command of lieutenant colonel Jose Eduvigis Diaz, but further organized into three units. The first, under the command of Celestino Prieto headed for Corrales, the second under lieutenant Saturnino Viveros headed for the fort of Itapirú, while the third was held in reserve.

General Conesa, with a very intrepid action, almost ambushed with full surprise a battalion led by lieutenant Celestino Prieto, with 250 men. But the noisy swamp and the Argentine troops singing wrecked the surprise and the Paraguayans fled under heavy fire. After this, general Resquin ordered commander Diaz, Viveros and Prieto to place their troops in strategic positions around the swamps for ambushing and launch counterattacks on the allied armies. 200 men under command of Diaz took the center, while 700 men of Viveros and Prieto were placed in the flanks.

By nightfall, Argentine troops tried to take the village by bayonet charges, having used up all their ammunition. By 18:30, Conesa ordered a withdrawal.

== Aftermath ==
Despite the victory obtained by the Paraguayans, Lopez's troops never again attempted a similar assault against the Allied Army. The Paraguayans embarked on their boats the night of 1 February, returning to Itapirú.

General Bartolomé Mitre praised the courage of the Argentine soldiers (included among the dead were Juan Serrano and Bernabé Márquez) but recommended his troops be "in future combats, less prodigious of their generous flame and fiery courage".

The Fortress of Itapirú eventually fell on 5 April 1866. The Argentine city of Pehuajó is named in honour of its founder, Dardo Rocha, a veteran who fought in this battle.
