= Battle of Camacuã =

- Part of the Cisplatine War
Date	23 April 1827
Location	North of Bagé, Rio Grande do Sul, Brazil
Result	United Provinces victory

Belligerents
Empire of Brazil	(Argentina) United Provinces

Commanders and leaders
Sebastião Barreto	Lucio Norberto Mansilla; José María Paz; Anacleto Medina

Strength
1,600 men	3,000 men

Casualties and losses
5 dead 8 wounded	1 dead 10 wounded

The Battle of Camacuã was fought in April 1827 by troops of the United Provinces and of the Empire of Brazil during the Cisplatine War. After their victory in the Battle of Ituzaingó, the Argentine army had left Brazil due to the lack of supplies and a bad state of their horses, but by April 13 had returned, retaken Bagé and marched towards the Brazilian army, which it made withdraw after this brief engagement.

== Engagement ==
The Brazilian cavalry approached the enemy camp and engaged their skirmishers; in this, they took the upper hand due to the superior state of their horses. Argentine commander Lucio Norberto Mansilla decided to attack them, trying to catch them unaware in order to disperse them and capture some horses. After a march during the night, aided by generals José María Paz e Anacleto Medina, on the morning of the 23rd of April they attacked the Brazilian positions, but a dense fog kept their victory from being complete. The Brazilians withdrew quickly, being harassed on their way to safety beyond the Camaquã River.

Mansilla, in his memoirs, reported the Brazilians suffered 50 killed, while Paz, on his, records a figure of "5 or 6 killed", though these could have been restricted to those engaged by his regiment in particular.
