= Emilio Conesa =

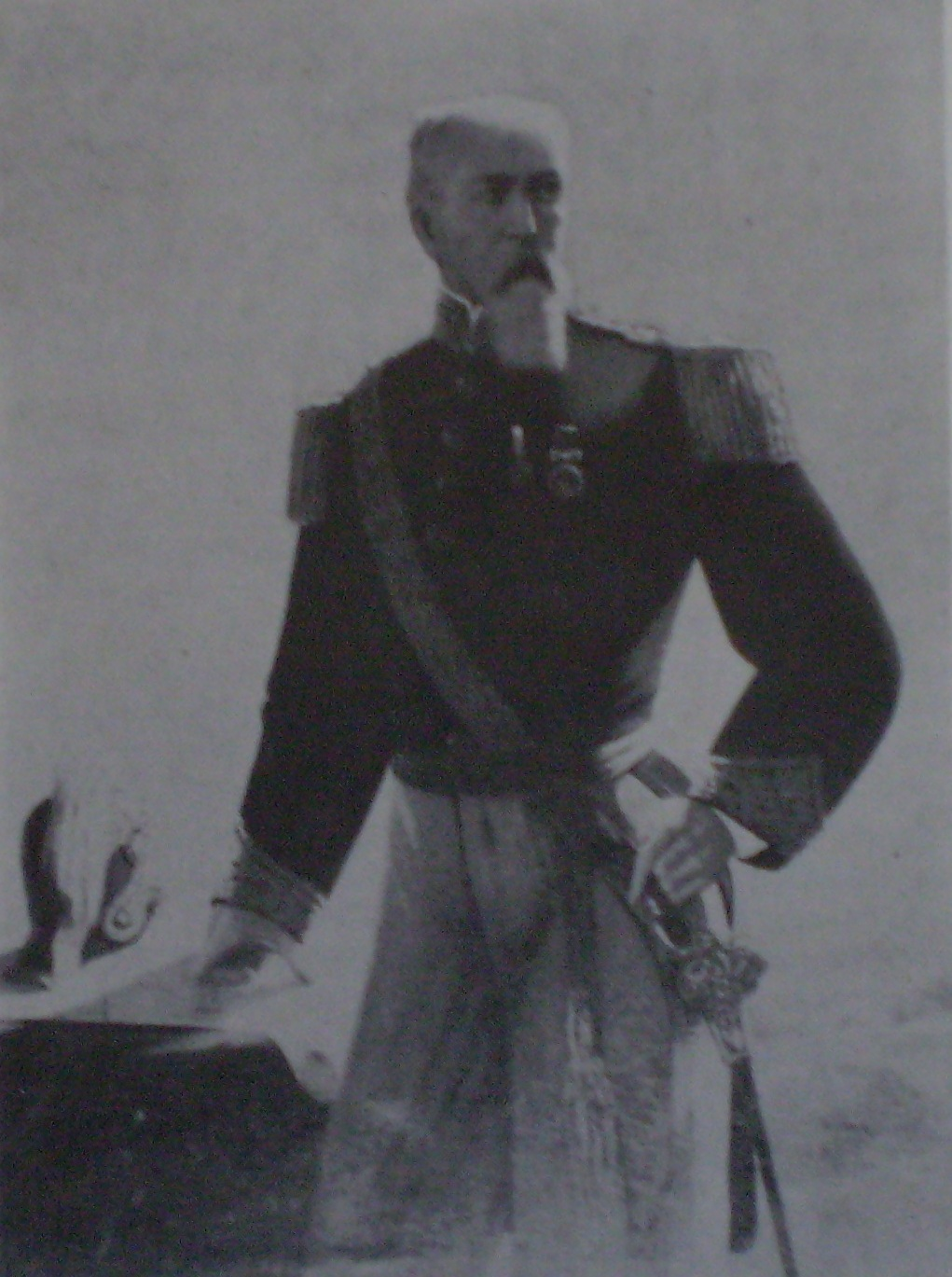
- Born: 1821; Buenos Aires, Buenos Aires Province, United Provinces of the Río de la Plata
- Died: 1873 (aged 52); Buenos Aires, Buenos Aires Province, Argentina
- Military career
- Allegiance: Argentina
- Branch: Argentine Army
- Rank: General
- Conflicts: Argentine Civil Wars; Uruguayan Civil War; Paraguayan War; Battle of Pehuajó

Emilio Conesa (1821-1873) was an Argentine military figure who was notable for his service being described as outstanding in the Argentine Civil Wars and in the Paraguayan War.

== Biography ==
Conesa was the son of José Antonio Conesa and Eustaquia de Casas, a couple that had recently arrived in Buenos Aires from Spain, fleeing the disorders of the Trienio Liberal.

He participated in the campaign of Juan Lavalle against Juan Manuel de Rosas in 1840 and made the campaign to the north of his country under his command, participating in the battles of Quebracho Herrado and Rodeo del Medio. After fleeing to Chile, he went into exile in Montevideo. He was an officer of the Argentine forces in the Uruguayan Civil War and for a short time he fought in Corrientes under General José María Paz.

He fought under the orders of Justo José de Urquiza in the Battle of Caseros. He supported the revolution of September 11, 1852 that separated the State of Buenos Aires from the Argentine Confederation. During the Siege of Buenos Aires that year and the next he commanded some battalions and briefly was commander of Martín García Island.

In 1856 he was commissioned to repel the federal invasion of Jerónimo Costa, who had been sentenced to death beforehand by a decree of the Governor Pastor Obligado. He defeated the Federalists in the Battle of Villamayor, and denied the surrender to the officers and soldiers who surrendered. The next day he shot the few prisoners he took, including General Costa himself, a hero of the defense of the island Martín García years ago.

He participated in an expedition to the southern borders in 1857, and participated in the battles of Sol de Mayo, Cristiano Muerto and Pigüé.

He was considered to be a hero during the Battle of Cepeda as he managed to successfully retreat to the front of the infantry and artillery after the defeat, saving the life and prestige of his boss, Bartolomé Mitre, which earned him promotion to the rank of colonel. He met with Urquiza preparing the future Pact of San José de Flores.

He was appointed controller of the San Juan Province along with General Juan Saá, dedicating himself to hinder their task; but he could not prevent it from invading the province. He was in charge of the army in the capital during the campaign of the Battle of Pavón and the following campaigns against the interior. Was devoted to the war against the Indian a few months, until he was elected national deputy in 1862.

He was promoted to general in 1863, and directed the installation of a line of forts in the Chaco Province, in the north of what is now the Santa Fe Province. At the beginning of the Paraguayan War, he was in charge of embarking the troops to Paraguayan territory. He played a prominent role in refusing to withdraw his troops at the Battle of Pehuajó, which did not prevent his defeat, and instead caused an excessive number of casualties among his own forces. In any case, he was charged with organizing the Army's crossing into Paraguayan territory through Paso de la Patria, an action that he successfully achieved. Conesa then participated in the Battle of Boquerón before requesting his release and returning to Buenos Aires for health reasons.

Partially recovered from his ailments, he took charge of the southern border of the Buenos Aires Province. He was in the south of the Córdoba Province, reorganizing the frontier against the natives, when the Revolution of the Colorados broke out in Cuyo at the end of 1866. Conesa then organized the formation of armies in the south of Córdoba, gathering successive contingents sent by Miter from Paraguay, and his second, General José Miguel Arredondo, defeated them in the decisive Battle of San Ignacio. Some time later he expelled the caudillo Simón Luengo from the city of Córdoba, who had overthrown federal governor Mateo Luque and reinstated him in government. But he limited his political action in every possible way, prevented him from making any decisions, and arrested several of his collaborators. His performance caused Luque to resign shortly after, and he lobbied for him to be replaced by a liberal governor, Félix de la Peña.

In 1868 he mobilized the Army from the interior to the province of Santa Fe, with the intention of replacing the overthrown Mitrista governor Nicasio Oroño, but the attempt failed. That same year he was elected national deputy for Buenos Aires.

When the Jordanian Rebellion broke out in Entre Ríos Province led by the federal leader Ricardo López Jordán, he was the head of one of the great columns mobilized against him, and achieved the first important victory against the federalists, in the Battle of Puntas del Sauce. But he soon returned to Buenos Aires, with his very poor health and visibly aged. In 1870 he was again elected national deputy and the following year he presided over the Argentine Committee, the basis of what would gradually become the National Autonomist Party.

He died in Buenos Aires on September 3, 1873.

=== Legacy ===
He has the curious privilege of having three towns with his name in Argentina: General Conesa, Buenos Aires, General Conesa, Río Negro, and Conesa, Buenos Aires. He has a street in Buenos Aires, along the Saavedra, Núñez, Belgrano and Colegiales neighborhoods. There are also streets with the name of Conesa in other localities, such as in the district of Lomas de Zamora, Province of Buenos Aires, Córdoba and Rosario.
