= Martiniano Chilavert =

Argentine military officer (1798–1852)

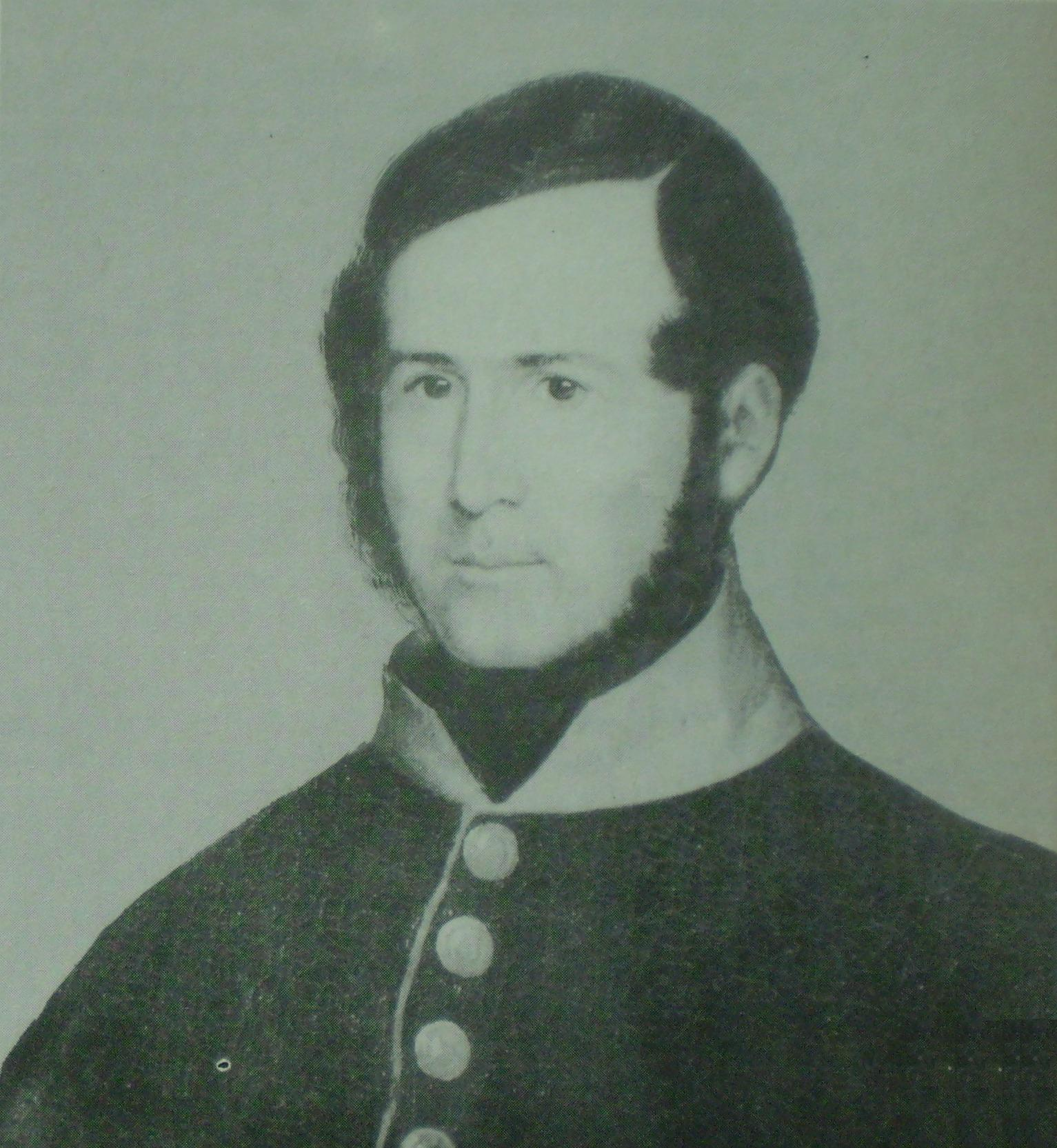
- Colonel Martiniano Chilavert
- Born: October 16, 1798 Buenos Aires, Viceroyalty of Rio de la Plata
- Died: February 4, 1852 (aged 53) Buenos Aires, Argentina
- Allegiance: (Argentina) Argentine Confederation
- Rank: Colonel
- Battles / wars: Cisplatine War; Argentine Civil Wars; Platine War; Battle of Caseros

Martiniano Chilavert (October 16, 1798 – February 4, 1852) was a 19th-century Argentine military officer who took part in the country's civil wars between the Unitarians and the Federales. Originally a Unitarian opponent of Federalist leader of Juan Manuel de Rosas, Chilavert turned to the Federalists after the Battle of Vuelta de Obligado. Chilavert was motivated by Rosas' resistance to the British and French and the other Unitarian leaders' alliance with foreign powers like the Empire of Brazil. The day after the Federalist defeat in the Battle of Caseros, which brought about the fall of Rosas regime, Chilavert was taken in custody. He was set for execution by shooting on the charge of treason upon direct orders of Unitarian leader Justo José de Urquiza. He was instead stabbed and killed with bayonets by the members of the firing squad after resisting to be shot in the back, a punishment commonly reserved for traitors.

== Bibliography ==
- Saldías, A. Historia de la Confederación Argentina. Buenos Aires: Eudeba, 1973.
- Palacio, E. Historia de la Argentina. Buenos Aires: Abeledo Perrot, 1986.
- Uzal, Francisco Hipólito (1974). El Fusilado de Caseros (La gloria trágica de Martiniano Chilavert). Ediciones La Bastilla Buenos Aires.
