= Presidency of Manuel Oribe =

Presidential term of Uruguay

- Presidency of Manuel Oribe; 1 March 1835 – 24 October 1838
- President: Manuel Oribe
- Cabinet: See list
- Party: National Party (since 1836)
- Election: 1835 presidential election
- Seat: Governor's House

The presidency of Manuel Oribe began on 1 March 1835 when he was inaugurated as the 2nd constitutional president of Uruguay. Oribe took office following his appointment by the General Assembly after he was unanimously voted in favour in the 1835 presidential election performed in the Parliament, while his presidency ended with his resignation on 24 October 1838 following the political pressures of that time.

This administration received the state treasury almost in bankruptcy, forcing the government to seek external financing. Among the outstanding policies of this period was the creation of Salto, Tacuarembó and Minas (currently named Lavalleja) Departments, the promotion of the tertiary education through the establishment of several degrees in the House of General Studies (that later would become the University of the Republic), amnesties to the 1832-1834 Lavalleja's uprisings followers and several pension laws. On the other hand, there were several armed uprisings encouraged by his new opponent, former president Fructuoso Rivera.

== Background ==
On 1 March 1835, Manuel Oribe was unanimously elected by the General Assembly as the second constitutional president of Uruguay, with the thirty-four legislators present voting for Oribe. This support reflected the reputation that Oribe was enjoying at that time, for "his moral, civic and military skills". The fact of being "Rivera's candidate" partly explained his triumph, but that did not mean that he had not had his own merits. His contribution to reach the peace was essential to definitively defeat the Lavalleja's rebellions, during which Oribe supported Rivera.

== Inauguration ==
Upon assuming his seat as the president of the republic, Manuel Oribe pronounced his speech:

Honorable Senators and Representatives of the Nation:

In presenting myself before you to take the oath of Law, my hearth is overwhelmed with a fear that I had not experienced even in front of the enemies.

So it is that when accepting the office that I have sworn, I will limit myself only to promise you that I will faithfully comply with and enforce the Constitution and the Laws.

— Manuel Oribe

== Cabinet ==
Office	Name	Term
President	Manuel Oribe	1835-1838
Government and Foreign Relations	Francisco Llambí	1835-1837
Juan Benito Blanco	1837-1838
Carlos Villademoros	1838
Finance	Juan María Pérez	1835-1836
Joaquín Muñoz	1836-1838
War and Navy	Pedro Lenguas	1835-1838

On 4 March 1835 Oribe announced his cabinet of government. Francisco Llambí was appointed as minister of Government and Foreign Relations, Juan María Pérez as minister of Finance, and general Pedro Lenguas as minister of War. Other appointments included those of Juan Benito Blanco as political chief of Montevideo, and José Rondeau as chief of the Army General Staff. The persons appointed came from different political postures and attempted to reconcile the different political movements of the country's political elite in previous periods.

Juan Benito Blanco took charge as political head of Montevideo Department on 1 April 1835. On 15 October 1836, he was appointed as General State Accountant by president Oribe, and on 6 August 1837 he replaced Francisco Llambí as the new minister of Government and Foreign Relations, until 1 September 1838 when he was replaced by Carlos Villademoros. On the other hand, before being designated as minister, Villademoros was a commercial attaché before imperial Brazil, until he was elected as a deputy for Montevideo in the third legislature of the House of Representatives.

Francisco Joaquín Muñoz took charge of the ministry of Finance on 21 October 1836, replacing Juan María Pérez because the latter was suffering an eyesight related health issue. Muñoz served as minister until August of the following year.

== Domestic policy ==
=== Public administration ===
A banner consisting of a white ribbon with the slogan "Defender of the laws" was created by decree of 10 August 1836. Its use was made mandatory for military officials, police officers and other public officials, who had to wear it on the hat or the eyelets of their uniforms. The purpose of this banner was to stand out those who were rebelling against the authorities, from which adhered to the legal authorities. Common citizens could also use this banner in the eyelets of their clothing as a sign of support for the authorities. This banner is considered the origin of the National Party's identity signature.

=== Defense ===
==== First rebellion of Rivera ====
The opposition to the ruling party, made up of politicians such as former ministers Lucas Obes and Santiago Vázquez, had the support of Rivera and him in turn acted as if it were acting as an autonomous government since the position created of General Commander of the Countryside, outside of the law. The political situation worsened after the beginning of the Ragamuffin War in 1835 in Rio Grande do Sul, because the revolutionaries had the sympathy of Lavalleja, opponent of Rivera. In a fear that a revolutionaries' success would boost his rival into a prevailing position in the government, Rivera decided to establish relations with the imperial commander of Rio Grande do Sul. However, Oribe, noticing this, decided to take over the seat of General Command of the Army, stationed on the border with Brazil, and suppressed the General Command of the Countryside, but trying not to break the relations with Rivera. But Rivera did not like this move.

The tensions between the administration and the opposition again appeared during the January 1836 elections of ordinary mayors, where the supporters of the executive and those of the general commander of the countryside performed a heated electoral campaign that at the end the supporters of the ruling party won. The opposition accused the government of having committed "an influence" on the elections and protests sparked in the opposition press. After these protests the closure of one of these newspaper was ordered, which the opposition described as "absolutist" and "anti-liberal".

Then, on 18 July, Rivera made a proclamation saying that he would rise against the government. The authorities ordered the use of a white banner (see above) to distinguish those who were supporting the official side from those supporting the rebels. On the other hand, Rivera's rebels initially adopted a light blue colored banner like the color of the national cockade, but it was gradually replaced by a red banner because the light blue banner would become white, the color of their rivals, due to rain or washing. Since a few months ago Rivera had sold his ranchs to finance his campaign, and obtained the support of militias from Paysandú, Durazno and Soriano, as well as the support of the forces led by general Lavalle, an Argentine unitarian. The legal forces consisted mostly of the National Guard led by general Ignacio Oribe, but also joined their side the forces led by Lavalleja. On 19 September 1836, the Battle of Carpintería took place, and the peoples with red and white banners fought each other. At the end, this battle was won by the government forces. The peace was restored and some high-profile supporters of Rivera were exiled, among them Obes and Vázquez, who refugeed in Rio de Janeiro, and they were banned from returning to Uruguay. Other Rivera supporters such as the unitarians Rivadavia, Agüero and Cruz were exiled to Santa Catarina. Regarding to the lieutenants who fought for Rivera, Oribe dediced in a conciliatorly way to agreed to their clemency request, what led him to win the respect of his adversaries.

==== Second rebellion of Rivera ====
The battle of Yucutujá was fought on 22 October 1837 at the lands of Yucutujá, located in the current department of Artigas, between the government troops of the president Manuel Oribe and the revolutionaries of Fructuoso Rivera, supported by the unitarian Juan Lavalle and the Riograndense Republic's troops from Piratini. In this battle fought about 800 men for each side. The result of this battle was a victory for Rivera.

==== Battle of Palmar ====
The battle of Palmar was an armed conflict fought on 15 June 1838 between the rebel forces led by Fructuoso Rivera, and the forces led by Ignacio Oribe and Juan Antonio Lavalleja, the latter supporters of the authorities under the presidency of Manuel Oribe. The battle site of Palmar was located in the department of Paysandú, between the cities of Guichón and Piñera. This battle also ended with a victory for Rivera.

=== Human rights ===
==== Amnesty for the Lavalleja revolutionaries ====
At the end of March 1835, Oribe appeared before the General Assembly to request authorization to pay a subsidy to the exiled military members due to the failed revolutions of 1832 to 1834, on the grounds that despite they had risen in arms against the constitutional authorities, before that they distinguishedly served during the Wars of Independence. This request was fulfilled with the approval of the law no. 96 of 16 June 1835, where the General Assembly authorized the Executive Power to proceed with this purpose in the way it deemed "compatible with the public tranquility and circumstances of the treasury".

Then, after being legally authorized, Oribe issued two decrees. The first granted a third of the salary to the exiled chiefs and officers, under the condition they stayed in Argentina and not elsewhere. According to Eduardo Acevedo, this condition was strange, if it was taken into account that the core of the Lavalleja revolutionary movement was settled in Buenos Aires, but in his opinion it was consistent with the new solidarity policy between the two countries that Rosas promoted and Oribe accepted. The second decree allowed them to return to all the emigrated people who would like to return.

Given these decrees, Juan Antonio Lavalleja requested from Buenos Aires to be returned his goods seized due to the armed uprisings during the presidency of Rivera he was part of, or a compensation for them. Oribe agreed to his request, and waived the existing hindrances, under the reasoning of "the respect that deserved the individual property". To this series of measures, which moved away from the policies of those of the presidency of Rivera, another one was added, that the law no. 126 of 21 June 1836 authorized the Executive Power to pay all the occupied properties due to political reasons of the 1832 and 1833 revolutions, prior legal justification and in a way the treasure was able to provide funds.

==== Freedom for the slaves introduced to the country ====
Since 1825, slave traffic was forbidden and was declared the freedom of wombs by a law of the Hall of Representatives of the Eastern Province. The slave traffic was again prohibited by the Constitution of 1830. However, the slave traffic in fact continued for several years. Because of that, the law no. 156 of 16 June 1837 was approved, by which all the black people that since then were being trafficked into the country would become automatically free. In addition to that, it established a system of protection to these peoples until the majority of age, or for three years for the individuals over twenty-five years of age, to "reconcile this freedom with their state of civilization".

=== Economy and finance ===
The national treasury was under a difficult situation and under the risk of bankruptcy at the end of the presidency of Rivera, and this was already known during the interim presidency of Carlos Anaya. During that period, Oribe, before being elected as the president of the republic, requested the adoption of measures to alleviate the situation, such as to sign a treaty of commerce with Great Britain in order to be able to obtain later a loan that it could save the country's funds. After the presidency of Oribe began, the minister of finance proposed a plan to get out of the crisis, consisting of addressing the commitments with immediate expiration dates through the conversion of the existing debt to short term and low interest policies, the organization of the public credit, the raise of the fiscal burden through the expansion of the taxation system, restriction on public spending to equally leveling the income and the expenditures, to strictly foresee the amortization and cancellation of public debt, to ask for a loan to convert the debt into a long term obligation, and the establishment of a book of public debts and incomes, among other measures.

Among the proposed measures was to give the public grazing lands under a emphyteusis contract. Until that time, only 1644 leagues were given under this system, but there were over 4000 leagues of public lands. The latter, if they were transferred each league at the price of one thousand pesos, the state would obtain four million pesos. Therefore, if an interest of 2.5% was established, the state would receive about one hundred thousand pesos. Another proposed measure was to sell the urban lots of the Ejido de Montevideo, that were not profitable enough and could be sold. Also it was proposed to create a tax to the livestock industry, proportional to the profits obtained in that market, calculated on the 33% of the capital, and that taxation base would double in peacetime. On the other hand, the minister proposed to establish taxes on the rents of urban real estate, considering the recent increase of the population.

The already difficult financial situation worsened when several creditors appeared before the General Assembly claiming that they were owed by the state large amounts of money paid in down payments of taxes, war expenses caused by the Lavalleja revolutions, public works and loans, all of them generated under the presidency of Rivera and by amounts between 300,000 and 600,000 pesos. In order to solve this issue, a proposal was submitted to negotiate a loan of two million pesos, guaranteed by public incomes and with a 6% interest rate, up to 60% of the nominal value, to be cancelled with retrievable policies with the help of the profits obtained from the loan. The negotiations of this proposal became the law no. 82 of 31 March 1835, that authorized the Executive Power to negotiate a loan, domestically or internationally, until the amount of pesos that were necessary to cover the capital and the interests of the enforceable debt, subject to that only the debts recognized by a law were to be covered, and that the loan would have to be made on the basis of another law. The second rule, the law no. 87 of 30 April 1835, authorized the Executive Power to issue policies of up to 700,000 pesos to cover up to 50% of the enforceable credits, guaranteed on customs additional taxes, sealed papers, patents tax and the "alcabala".

In mid 1835 a loan of three million pesos was authorized. In that act, the General Assembly approved a law that created a record of public debts and incomes, in addition to create an amortization account.

=== Education ===
==== Elementary and secondary ====
At the beginning of this administration there were 33 public boys' schools and 2 girls' schools in all the territory. They were in a precarious situation, with lack of teaching materials, and payment of teaching staff in arrears. In order to improve the conditions of the public education, the government approved a decree in 1835, that ordered to provide the schools of the interior of the country of instructional materials. Another measure was the creation of a school of girls that, unlike the school of colored girls created during the Rivera administration, this would be for all girls without ethnic distinction. However, in actuality the colored girls were left without basic education because they ceased to attend to the classrooms.

Regarding the secondary education schools, during this administration their number grew. Apart from the Commercial School managed by the Court of the consulate, that in 1835 was subject of praise among the intellectuals of that time, other institutions such as the College of the Father Escolapios and the Eastern College of Humanities were founded.

==== Higher education ====
The university plan of 1833, within the prefoundational stage of the University of the Republic, promoted by the then senator Dámaso Antonio Larrañaga further advanced as it was foreseen, with the establishment of the schools of mathematics, jurisprudence and theology in 1835 to the House of General Studies. The tertiary courses started on 1 March 1836, being present during the official opening ceremony the president of the republic and the ministers.

The law of 1833 provided that after most of the schools of the House of General Studies were in operation, the university had to be established by the president of the republic. But this presidential order was only performed on 27 May 1838, declaring the Major University of the Republic as founded. The next day, the Executive Power sent to the Parliament a bill regarding the legal organization of the university, but this bill drafted by Larrañaga could not be considered due to the civil war that have just arisen.

=== Territorial organization ===
The law no. 84 of 7 April 1835 modified the borders of Montevideo Department, in whose contents is said: "the borders of the department of Montevideo designated at the time of the creation of the departments are reinstated". The decree of 28 August 1835 pointed out where would them pass through: from the mouth of the Santa Lucía river in the River Plate to the mouth of the Las Piedras stream into this river (it is currently considered that Las Piedras stream flows into the Colorado stream, and the latter is the one flowing into the Santa Lucía river), and the border goes on through this stream until its source at the Pereira hills. At that point, the border pass through the turn of the hill range until the source of Toledo stream. The departmental limit continues through Toledo stream until it flows into the he confluence with the Carrasco shoal (passing across of the Carrasco wetlands) and from there going through the stream until its mouth to the River Plate.

The law no. 158 divided Paysandú Department (that until then it included the entire territory north of the Negro river) into three parts, creating Salto and Tacuarembó Departments. It also created Minas Department from parts of Maldonado and Cerro Largo Departments.

=== Population ===
In 1836 a population census for electoral purposes was ordered, to comply with an article of the Constitution that there had to be a representative in the Chamber of Representatives every each three thousand persons or for a fraction not less than two thousand people, starting from the third legislature. This census would be directed by the ordinary mayors of the departments with the assistance of the peace judges, lieutenant mayors and police officers to know the population of each territorial unit. At the end, this census could not be completed because the rebellion led by Fructuoso Rivera arose, leaving Cerro Largo, Colonia and Paysandú without being recorded.

The census held in Montevideo, between June and October, was organized in the constituencies of Montevideo within city walls, two constituencies outside city walls, and another constituency of Manga, probably corresponding to the police and judicial sections. The number of inhabitants registered in the department was 26,054 inhabitants in 1836.

=== Social welfare ===
The law no. 81 of 19 March 1835 granted pensions to the widows of deceased military chiefs and officers of the army, and if that was not possible, to their sons under 21 years of age or daughters while they would not marry. In order to receive this pension, the deceased must have served for at least eight years of service, as long as they were performed since 1 May 1825. This pension consisted of a payment of the third part of the salary if the duty time was not over twenty years, half of the salary if the deceased served from twenty to thirty years, or two thirds if worked for more than thirty years. The widows or children of the deceased with less than eight years of service would receive a single payment of four full salaries of the deceased.

On 3 June 1835 the law no. 91 of pensions for retirement of chiefs and officers of the army was approved, whereby all chiefs and officers who due to their duty would become out of commission and having at least ten years of service, would receive a pension during the same time they were on duty. The amount of this pension would be the third of their salary to officers with less than sixteen years of service, half of their salary worked from sixteen to thirty years of service, two thirds of the salary from thirty to forty years, and the full salary if they worked for more than forty years.

=== Land ownership ===
By law no. 122 of 3 June 1836, the General Assembly awarded to José Artigas, after a request by his son José María Artigas, the lands located between the Arerunguá, Cañas and Isla de Vera streams, covering an area of about fifteen and five sixths square leagues, in addition of granting him an exemption from any taxes on that estate. This law was relevant because it was the first time, and the only one with José Artigas still alive, where the Uruguayan state paid homage to him and recognized his services provided during the revolutionary era. It was also the first time he was officially described as General. By this law, his contemporaries sought to give him an early and definitive historical compensation, according to the opinions expressed during the law draft discussion as well as along the signatures that approved the law. This awarding of lands was also the first time of land tenure in the country that the Legislative Power directly awarded the ownership of a public land to an individual.

Artigas requested in 1805 before the General Commander of the Campaign, Francisco Javier de Viana, an estate from the public lands located between the Arapey Grande river and the Arerunguá and Valentín streams, under the jurisdiction of Belén. When he was about to take possession of the lands in 1811, he put aside his material interests to present himself before the First Junta, and that led him to lose his claim because of the patriotic cause. During the Luso-Brazilian occupation, Francisca Artigas de Villagrán and José María Artigas were not able to take possession of the estate, unlike the case of Artigas' partner Luis Sierra in 1824 that he could claim a land, because of not having economic resources to take their case to the court and also because the name of Artigas was proscribed during the imperial regime. José María Artigas tried again to submit a claiming action during the first presidency of Fructuoso Rivera, but asking for an exemption of the new rate established by the recently approved emphyteusis law because he was unable to pay that high. This request was just received favorably during the second legislature. In mid 1840, however, Artigas' son would have sold the estate in the name of his father, after judicial authorization.

== Foreign policy ==
=== Mission Giró before Spain and the United Kingdom ===
During the efforts to obtain a loan to cover the existing public debts (see above in "Economy and finance"), president Oribe took the opportunity to establish relations with Spain and the United Kingdom. In order to do that, Juan Francisco Giró was appointed as a minister plenipotentiary before the Court of Madrid and as a confidential agent before the British government in London, for the purpose of getting the recognition of independence by Spain and establishing with the United Kingdom a free trade agreement.

For the recognition of Uruguay's independence by Spain, in theory promising because of the previous recognitions of Mexico, Chile and Venezuela, Giró was ordered that he had to reject any proposal that did not recognize the independence, but he was allowed to accept a proposal that indirectly recognize it, such as with a free trade agreement, only if there were similar previous cases of other Latin American countries. He was also ordered to not accept any proposal by which Uruguay was required to pay compensations for its independence, and if it required to pay for the debts that came from the time of the end of the Spanish dominion of Montevideo in 1814, it should be accepted only under the least burdensome terms possible.

On the relationship with the United Kingdom, the precedents were not promising, because the negotiations started during the interim administration of Anaya by the minister Obes, the British representative Hamilton had proposed a trade treaty whose provisions were similar of those signed with other Latin American countries, that included issues such as privileges for English products, exemptions from customs rights and exceptions for British citizens regarding matters such as the freedom to profess their own religion; and these terms were evidently injuring the sovereignty and interests of Latin American countries in their respective cases. Except for the religious issue, because of the other matters that gave the English people a clause of the most favored nation, this proposal ended up being rejected by the Uruguayan authorities in January 1835. Taking into account this background, Giró presented a document describing the country, its economy and relations with other Latin American countries. But in London there was some mistrust towards the South American countries but specially towards Uruguay due to its unstable political and financial situation. And this mistrust was even used by the British press and other individuals who in bad faith accused Uruguay of promoting slave traffic (see above the measures took by the government to halt the slave traffic). At the end of 1836, Giró received a proposal from a financial house of Liverpool to obtain a loan equal to three million pesos, but under an exorbitant condition of transferring them from 200 to 300 square leagues of lands in lease where ten thousand white settlers would establish, but this proposal did not materialize after the treaty was rejected.

=== Treaty of commerce and navigation with France ===
In 1836, based on the negotiations promoted by the consul of France before Uruguay, Raymond Baradère, a preliminary agreement was signed to a treaty of commerce and navigation, that agreed to grant each signing nation the quality of "most favored nation" regarding diplomatic agents, persons, goods and ships, and also allowed consuls to demand the arrest of deserting sailors on board. This agreement, however, would just be ratified during the second presidency of Rivera in 1839.

== End of term ==
On 24 October 1838, Oribe appeared before the General Assembly to present his resignation, as it was agreed at the Peace Convention signed on 21 October 1838 in Miguelete after the several internal revolutions, where he argued he did because it was needed to reach the national convenience and tranquility, but under protest accusing the French, that recently was blockading the federalist government in Buenos Aires (allied of Oribe's government) with her navy, for having influenced his resignation. Oribe departed that same day and refuged in Buenos Aires, while Gabriel Pereira, at that time the current president of the Senate, took the charge of interim president.

== See also ==
- History of Uruguay
- Politics of Uruguay
- Uruguayan Civil War

== Bibliography ==
- Acevedo, Eduardo (1919). Historia del Uruguay. Vol. 2. Montevideo: Imprenta Nacional.
- Armand Ugon, E.; Cerdeiras Alonso, J. C.; Arcos Ferrand, L.; Goldaracena, C., eds. (1930). Compilación de Leyes y Decretos 1825-1930. Vol. II (1835-1843). Montevideo: IMPO.
- Castellanos, Alfredo (2011). Historia Uruguaya. Vol. 5. Montevideo: Ediciones de la Banda Oriental.
- Fernández Saldaña, José María (1945). Diccionario uruguayo de biografías 1810-1940. Montevideo: Amerindia.
- Reyes Abadie, Washington; Vázquez Romero, Andrés (1981). Crónica general del Uruguay. Vol. 3. Montevideo: Ediciones de la Banda Oriental.
