= Revolution of 1897 =

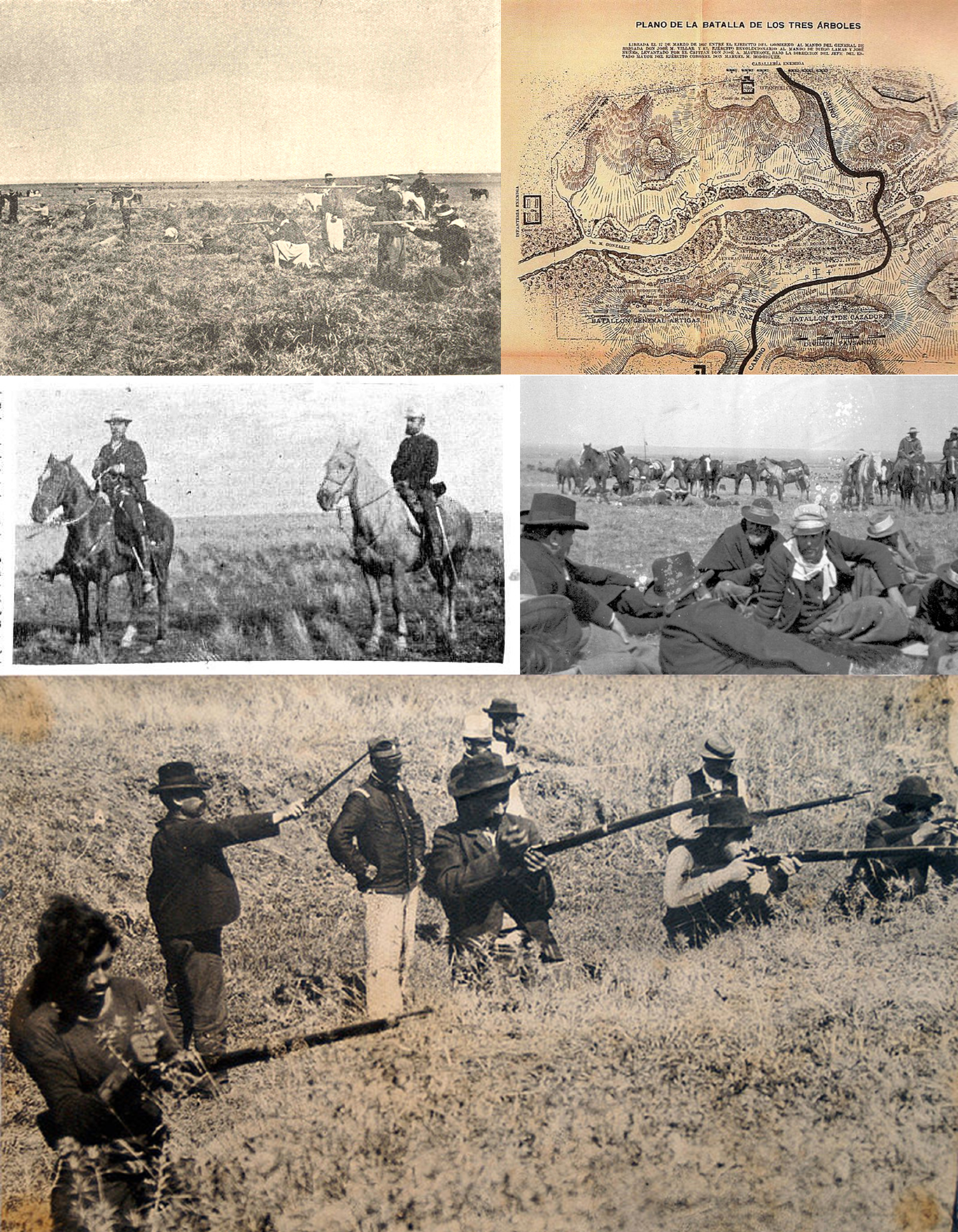
Date	1897
Location	Uruguay
Result	Agreement between the National Party and the Government

Belligerents
Blanco Revolutionary	Colorado Government

Commanders and leaders
Aparicio Saravia; Diego Lamas; Isabelino Canaveris; Luis Alberto de Herrera	Juan Idiarte Borda; Eduardo Vázquez; Justino Muniz; José Villar

Units involved
Blanco Army	Governmental Army

Strength
3,000	10,000

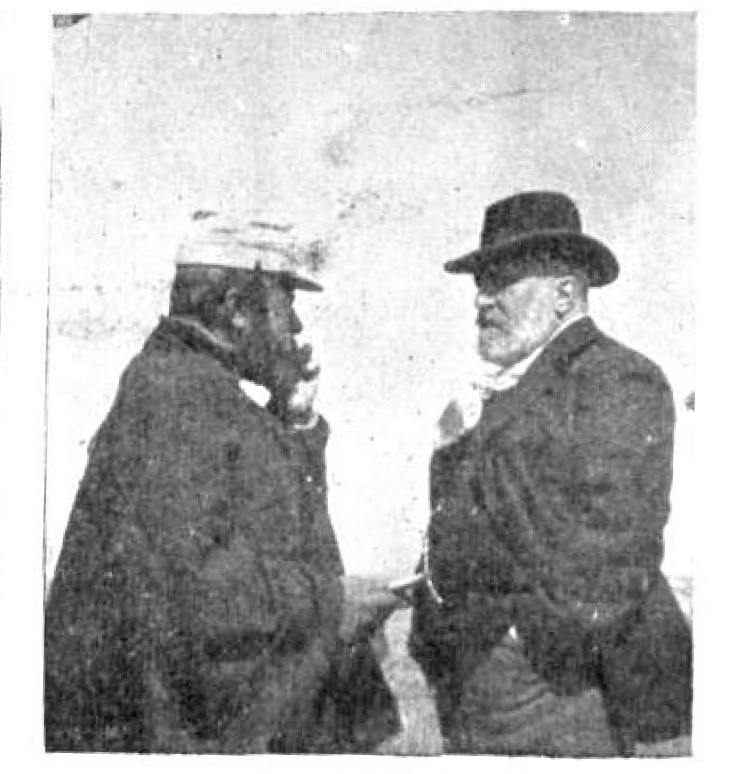
Diego Lamas and José Pedro Ramírez, during the peace agreement

The Revolution of 1897 was an uprising led by the army of the Uruguayan National Party against the government of President Juan Idiarte Borda. It took place in Uruguayan territory between March 5 and September 18, 1897.

== History ==
The revolutionary movement was led by the Caudillo Aparicio Saravia, and the General Diego Lamas, who arrived at the Banda Oriental from Buenos Aires, together with the so-called "22 de Lamas", among which was Lieutenant Colonel Isabelino Canaveris. On March 17, 1897, took place the Battle of the Tres Arboles (department Río Negro), where the forces of General Diego Lamas defeated the army of Colonel José Villar.

One of the causes of the conflict was electoral fraud denounced by leaders of the National Party, who demanded greater transparency in the elections. After several months of conflict, a peace agreement was signed on September 18, 1897.
