= Battle of Paso Severino =

Battle of the Revolution of the Lances

- Part of the Revolution of the Lances
Date	September 12, 1870
Location	Santa Lucia Chico River, Florida Department, Uruguay
Result	Colorado government victory

Belligerents
Colorado Party (Uruguay)	National Party (Uruguay)

Commanders and leaders
José Gregorio Suárez	Timoteo Aparicio

Strength
5,000	5,000

The Battle of Paso Severino was the first battle of the Revolution of the Lances, an attempt by the Blancos, under Timoteo Aparicio, to overthrow the Colorado-led Government of Uruguay. The government forces under José Gregorio Suárez were defeated and they retreated overnight with the Blancos in pursuit.
