= Battle of Manantiales =

Battle in Southwestern Uruguay

- Part of the Revolution of the Lances
Date	July 17, 1871
Location	Manantiales, Colonia Department, Uruguay
Result	decisive Colorado government victory

Belligerents
Colorado Party (Uruguay) government	National Party (Uruguay) rebels

Commanders and leaders
Enrique Castro	Timoteo Aparicio

Strength
2,000 – 4,000 soldiers, 8 artillery pieces	2,500 – 4,000 soldiers

The Battle of Manantiales was fought in southwestern Uruguay as part of the internal conflict between the Blancos and the Colorados that had been going on intermittently since the country's independence. The Blancos, led by Timoteo Aparicio, were leading a rebellion to overthrow the Government of Uruguay, controlled by the Colorados since the end of the Uruguayan War.

On 17 July 1871 government General Enrique Castro attacked Aparcio's force. The rebels were decisively defeated.

Rebel sources stated that Aparicio had 2,800 men, while government estimates were 3,600 men. The revels stated that the government had 3,500 men.
