= Revolution of the Lances =

Civil War in Uruguay (1870-1872)

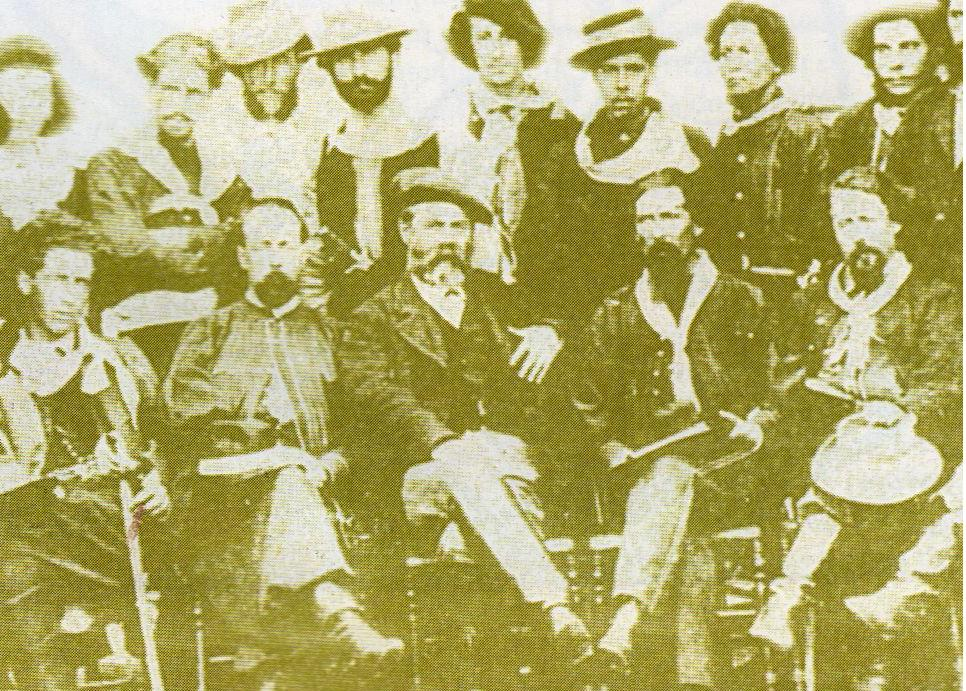
- Revolutionary officers and soldiers under Timoteo Aparicio, 1871.
Date	1870 – 1872
Location	Uruguay
Result	Power-sharing agreement reached.

Belligerents
Blanco Revolutionaries	Colorado Government

Commanders and leaders
Timoteo Aparicio; Anacleto Medina	Lorenzo Batlle; Enrique Castro

Units involved
Blanco Army	Governmental Army

The Revolution of the Lances (Revolución de las Lanzas) occurred in Uruguay from September 12, 1870 to April 6, 1872.

== Parties ==
Led by Timoteo Aparicio, leader of the National Party of Uruguay (the Blancos) and a former army officer. Begun two years earlier under the constitutional government of Lorenzo Batlle, it was named after the tacuara, an improvised weapon used by South American militias, consisting of a knife tied to a stalk of cane similar to bamboos, resulting in a rudimentary lance.

== Resolution ==
The series of events ended with a power-sharing agreement between the Blanco and the Colorado Parties.

The agreement in one form or another was to last until the early 20th century, when the Blanco forces were defeated at the Battle of Masoller in 1904.

== Battles ==
- Battle of Paso Severino
- Battle of Corralito
- Taking of the Fortaleza del Cerro (Toma de la Fortaleza del Cerro)
- Battle of Sauce (1870)
- Battle of Manantiales (July 17, 1871)
- Battle of Paso de los Loros de Arroyo Grande

== See also ==
- Uruguayan Civil War#Later conflicts
