= Ricardo López Jordán =

Argentine general (1822–1889)

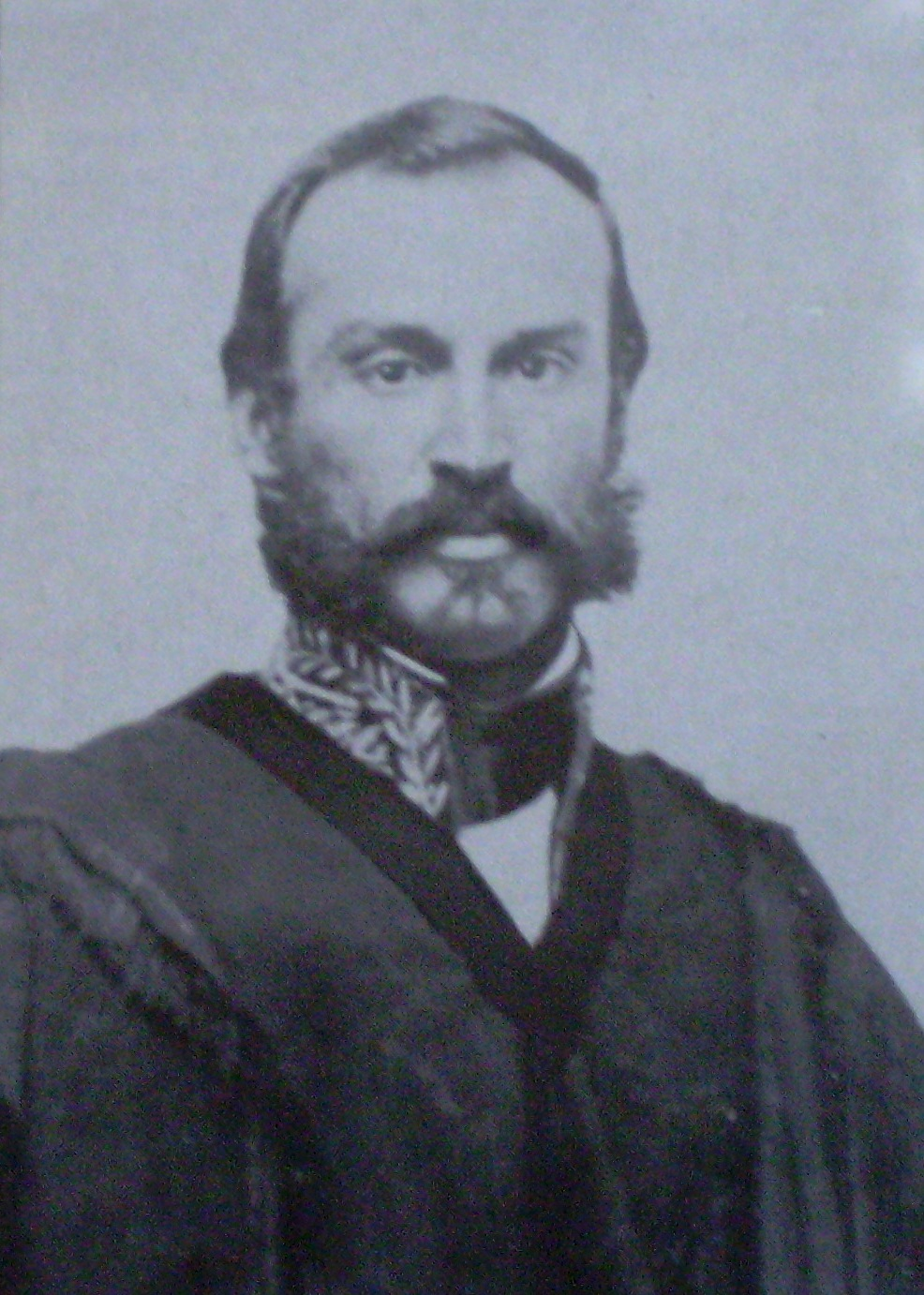
- Born: 1822; Paysandú, Uruguay
- Died: 1889 (aged 66–67); Buenos Aires, Argentina
- Military career
- Allegiance: Federalists
- Rank: Governor

Ricardo Ramón López Jordán (1822–1889) was an Argentine soldier and politician, one of the last influential "caudillos" (Spanish for "leaders", or military or political strongmen) in the history of Argentina. He thrice rebelled against the government of Buenos Aires and was defeated in each attempt.

== Beginnings ==
López Jordán was born in Paysandú, in present-day Uruguay, in August 1822, son of the Argentine general of the same name, a former governor of the Argentine province of Entre Ríos who found himself living in Paysandú as an exile. Young Ricardo Ramón López Jordán's uncle Francisco Ramírez, another political strongman, was also active in the life of the region. The father returned to Entre Ríos with his son in 1824 but in 1827 was again obliged to seek refuge in Uruguay. When, in 1830, the father tried (with the support of fellow strongman Juan Lavalle) again to recover power in the province, he sent Ricardo to study at the Colegio San Ignacio in Buenos Aires.

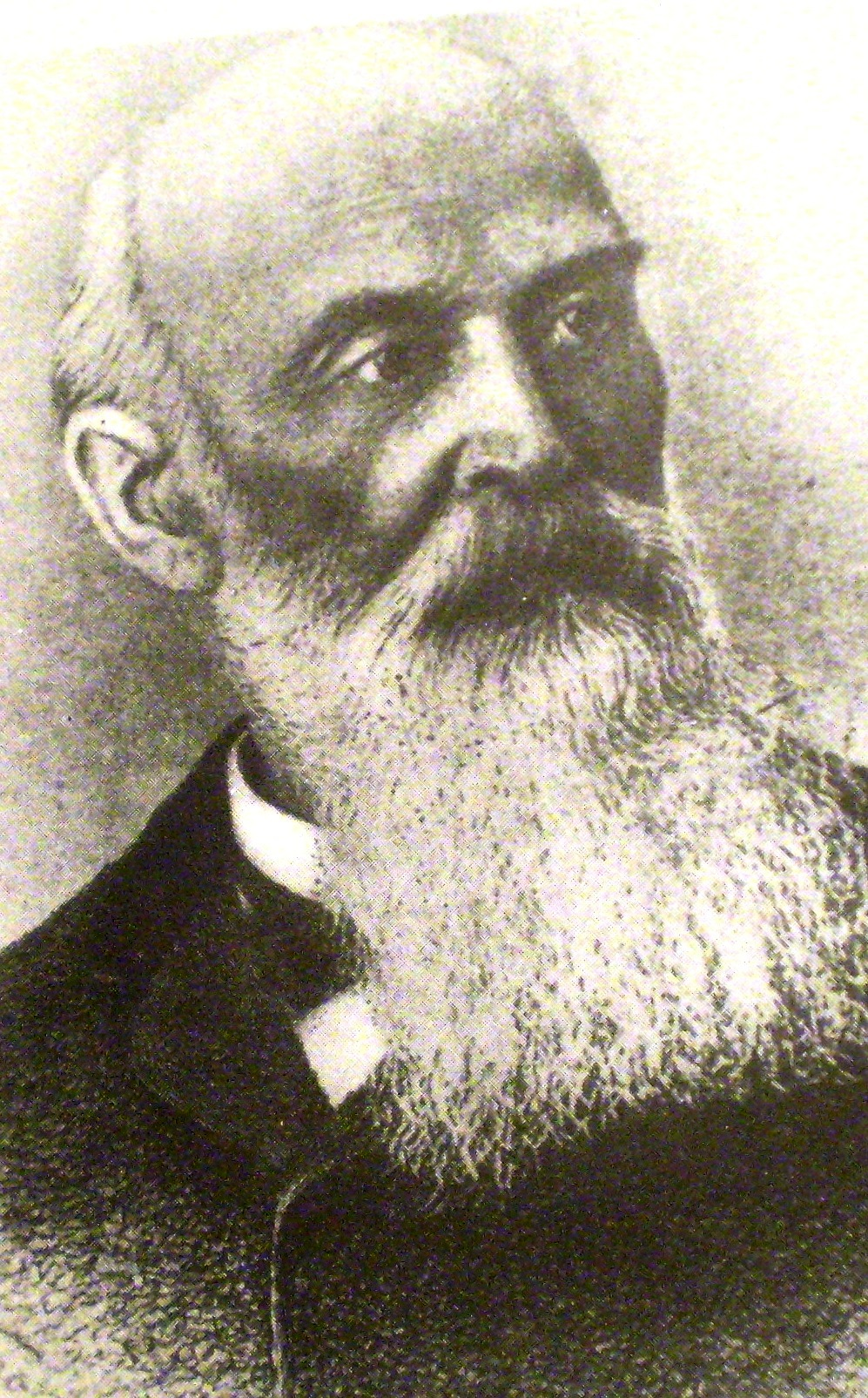
Ricardo López Jordán Sr., whose pro-autonomy sentiment led to his exile and was instilled in his son.

At the end of 1841, as part of the continuing Argentine civil wars, López Jordán was brought into the army of the governor Justo José de Urquiza in the defense of his province against an invasion from the Argentine province of Corrientes. On December 6, 1842, López Jordán fought in the battle of Arroyo Grande under the command of the Uruguayan general Manuel Oribe, against the forces of Fructuoso Rivera; he was sent to Buenos Aires with news of Oribe's victory. López Jordán spent the following months convincing Juan Manuel de Rosas to free his father, the erstwhile governor of Entre Rios, who complied with his son's promise to Rosas that he would not involve himself in politics again.

López Jordán accompanied Urquiza in his campaign in Uruguay (where he fought in the battle of India Muerta) and in the campaign in the Argentine province of Corrientes (fighting in the battles of Laguna Limpia, against José María Paz on February 14, 1846, and Vences). In 1849, López Jordán was named military commandant of Concepción del Uruguay, the home town of his family, of his uncle Francisco Ramírez, and of Urquiza.

After Urquiza's pronouncement against the Argentine dictator, Juan Manuel de Rosas, on May 1, 1851, and the invasion of Uruguay, Urquiza sent López Jordán, now a captain, to receive the surrender of Manuel Oribe, who with Rosas's support had for eight years besieged the Uruguayan capital, Montevideo (it was in this city that Amadeo Gras painted López Jordán's portrait in oils). As a soldier in the "Great Army" that Urquiza formed, López Jordán took part in the victorious campaign that ended with Rosas's overthrow at the Battle of Caseros, in which he fought as one of the commanders of the cavalry. He then returned to his post as commandant of Concepción del Uruguay.

On November 21, 1852, after the revolution of September 11, the province of Buenos Aires invaded Entre Rios from two directions. The column under command of General Manuel Hornos landed at the river town of Gualeguaychú and managed to defeat a Colonel Galarza of the army of Entre Rios. The invaders then reached the outskirts of Concepción del Uruguay, where they were defeated by López Jordán's forces, principally comprising students at the Colegio (secondary school) of the city.

In 1858, López Jordán made a brief incursion into Uruguay in order to protect the Uruguayan government from an invasion supported from Buenos Aires. That same year, he was elected deputy to the national legislature and moved to the city of Paraná. He again took up his post as commandant of Concepción del Uruguay at the end of 1859 and took no part in the Battle of Cepeda, having been left in charge of the defense of the border formed by the Uruguay River. After the battle, Urquiza advanced toward Buenos Aires and signed the Treaty of San José de Flores, in which the dissident province of Buenos Aires strongly conditioned its reluctant reincorporation into the Argentine republic. In this moment, López Jordán began to doubt the firmness of his chief; the situation led inevitably toward a new confrontation.

When Urquiza left the presidency of Argentina and resumed the governorship of Entre Ríos, he made López Jordán one of his ministers on May 1, 1860. During this time, López Jordán bought a ranch, Arroyo Grande, near the Uruguay River.

== Enmity toward Urquiza ==
In 1861, Argentine president Santiago Derqui named López Jordán chief of one of the two cavalry columns that fought in Battle of Pavón on September 17 of that year. In the battle, López Jordán, Juan Saá, and Benjamín Virasoro completely defeated the cavalry of the city of Buenos Aires, while the Federalist infantry was repulsed. But Urquiza, without putting his whole army into action, retired with all his infantry, artillery, and reserves. All the Federalists thought that Urquiza had passed to the side of Buenos Aires, which is fairly certain: he appears to have come to a tacit accord with Bartolomé Mitre, a future president of Argentina, to permit Urquiza to control his own province without interference while abandoning the Confederation to its fate.

Derqui promoted his two victorious military chiefs, Saá and López Jordán, to general on September 20, but the two generals were not able to defend him. López Jordán turned back to Entre Ríos, obeying Urquiza's order, and renounced his governmental and military duties. A little later, Derqui resigned his own office and the Argentine Confederation was dissolved. The following year, after nearly all the provincial governments had changed, Bartolomé Mitre was elected president.

López Jordán never forgave Urquiza for having retreated from Pavón and blamed Urquiza for the national government's remaining under the control of centralists from the city of Buenos Aires. But, for the moment, López Jordán did not make up his mind to take action: he still believed in Urquiza, even if less and less.

From his province in the years that followed, López Jordán observed how the Federalists in the western reaches of Argentina and in the province of Corrientes were destroyed without the leader of the Federalist party, Urquiza, doing a thing to aid them. He also saw how an invasion supported by the province of Buenos Aires and by Brazil overthrew the lawful president of Uruguay and how a Brazilian fleet destroyed his native city, Paysandú. Urquiza still did nothing.

In 1864, López Jordán stood as a candidate to succeed Urquiza as governor of Entre Ríos, but Urquiza declared himself to be in favor of the candidacy of his nephew José María Domínguez, a man completely subordinated to his political leader and who, in the end, was elected.

The war in Uruguay provoked a Paraguayan reaction which led to the Paraguayan War. Urquiza called the people of Entre Rios to the war against Paraguay; López Jordán accompanied him but later told Urquiza that

"You call us to war against Paraguay. Never, General: these people are our friends. Call us to struggle against the people of Buenos Aires and against the Brazilians. We're ready. Those are our enemies."

Urquiza ordered the mobilization of the forces of Entre Ríos at the encampment of Basualdo, in the northern part of the province. Eight thousand men presented themselves there, but nearly all believed that they were to unite with the Paraguayans against the Brazilians. When the citizens learnt on whose side they were to fight, they simply went home. López Jordán supported and cheered the desertions and was accused of having instigated it. When Urquiza again tried to gather his army, this time at the encampment of Toledo, the men again deserted. In the end, only eight hundred citizens of Entre Rios went to war; and very few returned from it.

In 1867, a revolution organized by Juan Saá, Juan de Dios Videla, and Felipe Varela broke out in the Argentine provinces of Mendoza and La Rioja. These leaders invoked the name of Urquiza and begged him to support the revolution. Urquiza did not move, and the revolution was quickly defeated. A powerful opposition censured Urquiza, but the power of the caudillo was greater, and there were many arrests.

In 1868, Urquiza lost the election for president of Argentina but chosen by the provincial legislature in April of that year, again became governor of Entre Ríos, in spite of the popular support for López Jordán's candidacy. On July 31 of that same year, López Jordán and Justo Carmelo Urquiza, son of the caudillo, defeated national forces invading in support of a revolution in Corrientes even while rumors were circulating that López Jordán might start a rebellion against Urquiza in Entre Ríos.

The war against Paraguay ended the following year; the cost to Argentina was more than ten thousand deaths. A few months later, at his lavish country seat, San José palace, Urquiza received the Argentine president, Domingo Faustino Sarmiento, whom the Federalists regarded as the chief of their enemies, the embodiment of all they opposed. López Jordán prepared himself for revolution.

That revolution erupted on April 11, 1870. As a first step, a party of 50 men under the command of Simón Luengo penetrated San José palace with the object of seizing Urquiza; but he defended himself by shooting and ended up dead. That same day, in the city of Concordia, Entre Ríos, Urquiza's sons Justo Carmelo and Waldino, both intimate friends of López Jordán, were killed too.

Three days later, the provincial legislature chose López Jordán as provisional governor of Entre Ríos, to complete Urquiza's term as governor. In his inaugural address, López Jordán supported the revolution and in passing scarcely mentioned that he had "deplored that . . . no other way might have been found than that the illustrious víctim sacrificed himself." Later, López Jordán was sought to head a rebellion against the national government. He did not rebel and, indeed, he lacked the time in which to do so.

== The Jordanist Rebellion ==
Sarmiento, the Argentine president, treated the revolution in Entre Ríos and the murder of Urquiza as provocative acts against himself and on April 19, 1870, sent an "Army of Observation" to Entre Ríos. This force, composed of veterans of the war against Paraguay, posted itself at Gualeguaychú. Sarmiento never declared that the national government would intervene in matters in Entre Ríos (an intervention the Argentine congress was opposing) but instead issued a presidential decree on April 25 in which he declared war, as against an enemy country, and declared that López Jordán and those who accompanied him were "accused of rebellion". Three generals attacked Entre Ríos at the same time: Emilio Mitre disembarked at Gualeguaychú; Emilio Conesa, at Paraná; and Juan Andrés Gelly y Obes entered from Corrientes.

A series of engagements followed, ending at last with the defeat of López Jordán in the Battle of Ñaembé in the province of Corrientes. He fled to Brazil with 1,500 supporters.

Elections were held in Entre Ríos in his absence, but without Federalist candidates, who were barred, and with very few voters. The new governor, Emilio Duportal, threw all Federalists out of office, even out of the governmental positions of priests (the Roman Catholic Church being the established church) and teachers. Public lands were sold at supposedly public auctions, but actually reserved for friends of the government; many settlers were ejected from their lands, and the police, recruited from outsiders, committed all manner of assaults and other crimes against the citizenry. Ashamed, Duportal resigned and the province fell into the hands of Leónidas Echagüe, son of the former governor Pascual Echagüe, who had none of the moral qualms of his predecessor.

López Jordán returned to Entre Ríos on May 1, 1873. On the 28th, Sarmiento sent proposed legislation to the lower house of the national congress, the Cámara de Diputados, offering a hundred thousand pesos for the head of López Jordán and ten thousand for that of Mariano Querencio, in addition to the sum of a thousand pesos for the head of each of the “authors of excesses committed for the revolution”.

On December 9, Generals Gainza and Vedia defeated López Jordán at the Battle of Don Gonzalo, in which Remington rifles made their first appearance among Argentine troops and ravaged the revolutionary ranks. On Christmas Day, December 25, 1873, López Jordán crossed the Uruguay River at the pass of Cupalén, exiling himself to Uruguay. The province of Entre Ríos was again subjected to rule by force, and the Federalist party was greatly weakened by hundreds of arrests.

López Jordán made new plans, which included a revolution in the entire country with the support of Brazil. He again returned to his province on November 25, 1876, but this time he had no support. On December 7, one of his detachments was annihilated by General Juan Ayala in combat at Alcaracito (in the Department of La Paz in Entre Ríos), after which many of López Jordán's partisans who had been taken prisoner (a colonel, the son of Genaro Berón de Astrada, a former governor of the Argentine province of Corrientes, among them) were shot. It was the end of the last Federalist adventure. On December 16, López Jordán fled toward Corrientes but, betrayed by a friend, he was subjected to governmental justice at Goya.

He was held at Curuzú Cuatiá, Goya, Paraná, and Rosario; during the course of three years, his trial was repeatedly postponed, until, disguised as a woman, he escaped from prison with the help of his wife, Dolores Puig, on August 12, 1879. On September 3, López Jordán sought asylum at Fray Bentos, Uruguay.

== Later life ==
López Jordán stayed in voluntary exile at Montevideo, Uruguay, until the end of 1888, when, thanks to an amnesty decreed by Argentine president Miguel Juárez Celman in August of that year, he returned to his country and settled at Buenos Aires, whence he sought recommissioning into the Argentine army. But on June 22, 1889, López Jordán was shot and killed in the street by the young Aurelio Casas, who had been told that López Jordán had ordered the murder of his father, Zenón Casas, a military captain (although the killing had actually been ordered by a Uruguayan military officer, Cornelio Oviedo, in May 1873). The Urquiza family then presented the sum of thirty-five thousand pesos to the wife of Aurelio Casas.

The remains of Ricardo Ramón López Jordán were brought back to Entre Ríos in 1989 and temporarily deposited in the pantheon of the Pérez Colman family, in Paraná. On November 29, 1995, the remains were transferred to a mausoleum erected in Carbó square in Paraná.

== Bibliography ==
- Bosch, Beatriz, Historia de Entre Ríos, Ed. Plus Ultra, Bs. As., 1991.(in Spanish)
- Bosch, Beatriz, Urquiza y su tiempo.(in Spanish)
- Chávez, Fermín, Vida y muerte de López Jordán, Inst. Urquiza de Estudios Históricos, Bs. As., 2000.(in Spanish)
- Newton, Jorge, Ricardo López Jordán, último caudillo en armas, Ed. Plus Ultra, Bs. As., 1972.(in Spanish)
