= Battle of Caseros =

1852 battle in Argentina

- Part of the Platine War, the Argentine Civil Wars and Uruguayan Civil War
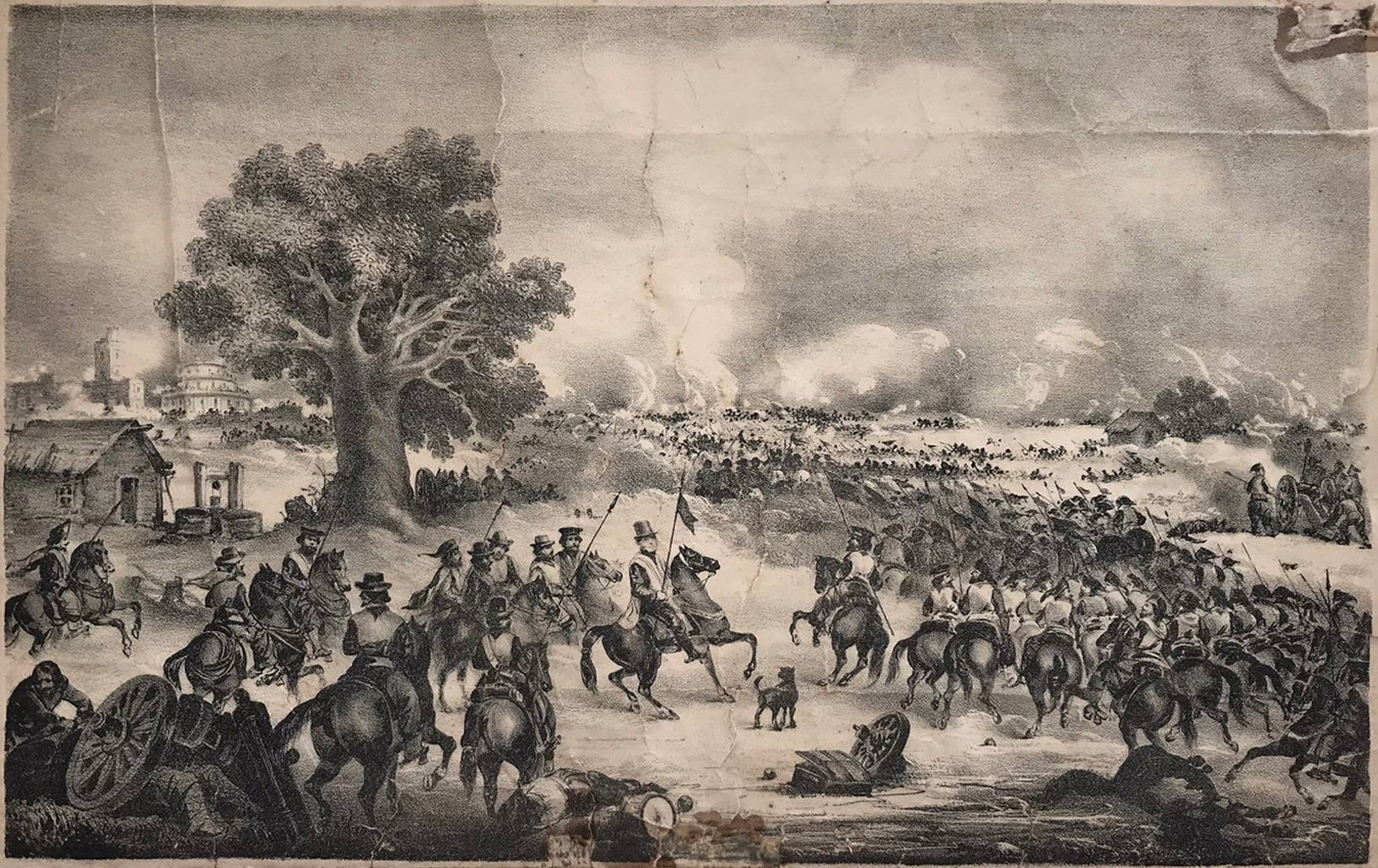
- Battle of Caseros, Lithograph by Carlo Penuti, ca. 1852.
Date	3 February 1852
Location	El Palomar, Argentina 34°36′07″S 58°35′52″W
Result	Allied victory: Colorados seize power in Uruguay; Rosas exiled to Southampton, England

Belligerents
Entre Ríos; Corrientes; Empire of Brazil; Uruguay	Argentine Confederation

Commanders and leaders
Justo J. de Urquiza; Marques de Sousa; Manuel Luís Osório	Juan M. de Rosas; Martiniano Chilavert; Jerónimo Costa; Hilario Lagos

Strength
24,206–28,000: 18,545 Argentines; 4,020 Brazilians; 1,641 Uruguayans; 50 guns 1–2 congreve batteries	22,000–26,000; 60 guns 1 congreve battery

Casualties and losses
600: 300 killed 300 wounded	8,500: 1,500 killed or wounded 7,000 captured

The Battle of Caseros (Spanish: Batalla de Caseros; Portuguese: Batalha de Caseros) was fought near the town of El Palomar, Argentina, on 3 February 1852, between forces of the Argentine Confederation, commanded by Juan Manuel de Rosas, and a coalition consisting of the Argentine provinces of Entre Ríos and Corrientes, the Empire of Brazil, and Uruguay.

The allied forces, known as the Grand Army (Ejército Grande), defeated Rosas, who fled to the United Kingdom. This defeat marked a sharp division in the history of Argentina. After the battle, Justo José de Urquiza, a caudillo and governor of Entre Ríos, became the provisional Director of the Argentine Confederation and sponsored the creation of the country's constitution in 1853, later becoming the first constitutional president of Argentina in 1854.

== Background ==
=== Argentine Civil War ===
From 1814 onwards, Argentina faced on serious internal challenges, resulting from disagreements over the proper form of government. This resulted in a series of civil wars that destabilized the young nation.

=== End of the Anglo-French blockade ===
A British-French alliance had stymied Argentine leader Juan Manuel de Rosas and his ally Manuel Oribe from taking the Uruguayan capital of Montevideo by blockading the Rio de la Plata. This began a long and arduous siege. However, as Rosas consolidated his position in the interior, the Europeans began to doubt the ability of the defenders of Montevideo to resist the siege, and thus began a series of agreements, culminating in the end of the blockade in the Arana–Southern Treaty. Emboldened, Rosas decided to tighten his grip on the city by outlawing any up to that point tolerated trade with the city, which angered those who relied on it, among them the governor of Entre Rios, Justo José de Urquiza.

=== Urquiza's pronunciamiento ===
The treaty came as a lucky break for Rosas as he began to face down a new threat: the Empire of Brazil, who felt threatened by the leverage Rosas might have over them with control over Montevideo and Uruguay in general. Rosas sent Urquiza to study the front and make preparations for a war with Brazil. Instead, Urquiza, suspicious that the warmongering was a ploy to delay the writing of an Argentine constitution, began to make plans of his own and negotiated loans from the Brazilians when he decided to rebel.

When he felt it was most opportune, he released a statement from Concepción del Uruguay known as his Pronunciamiento, calling for the resignation of Rosas. He began gathering troops, approximately 10,000 horsemen in total before making his next move.

=== The Uruguay Campaign ===
In a joint treaty with Brazil and the Montevideo government, Urquiza's Entre Rios government declared their intention to first expel Oribe from Uruguay and then establish free elections in Argentina. They also agreed to come to the others' defense if Rosas decided to declare war on them.

With his allies in Corrientes, Urquiza crossed into Uruguay while a Brazilian force invaded from north. Facing such overwhelming odds, Oribe did not put up a fight, and instead signed an agreement allowing him to extricate himself peacefully. The Brazilians imposed a harsh price on the Montevideo government for their help, annexing a northern strip of the nation and forcing them to declare Brazil the guarantor of Uruguayan independence.

=== The Grand Army's Campaign ===
Finally, the allies turned on Rosas, declaring war on his government. In compliance with the treaty, Urquiza led a joint army and crossed Morón creek, positioning his forces in Monte Caseros.

Rosas's response up to this point had been lethargic and overly cautious, and this time was no different. Leadership was confused as his appointed commander Angel Pacheco resigned due to contradictory micromanagement and incompetence on Rosas's part. In the end, Rosas, an aging politician more suited to administration than warfare, decided to take personal command of the battle. Because he was not an experienced or skilled commander, he made no effort to scout for a good battle position, and simply waited for the allies to come to him.

== The battle ==
=== The Defenders (Rosistas) ===
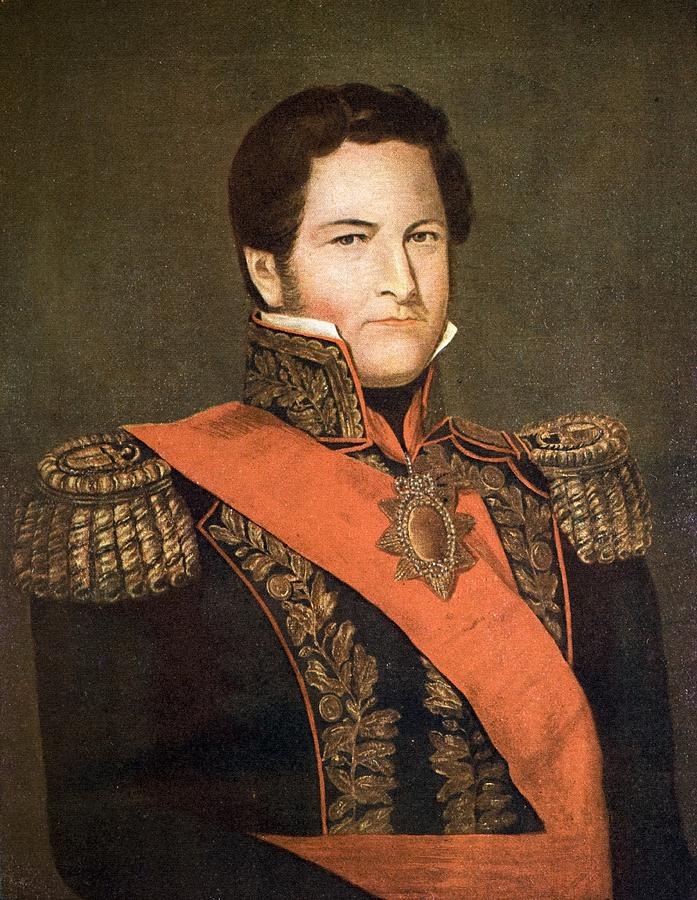
Juan Manuel de Rosas

Rosas' forces consisted of some 10,000 infantry troops, 12,000 cavalrymen and 60 guns. Among his captains were Jerónimo Costa, who defended Martín García island from the French in 1838; Martiniano Chilavert, a former opponent of Rosas who defected when his fellows allied themselves with foreigners; Hilario Lagos, veteran from the campaign against the Indians of 1833.

==== Desertions ====
Due to the poor morale and the desertion of commanders, most notably that of Ángel Pacheco, the Argentine army had already been thinned when the battle began. However, his opponent also suffered from desertions like that of the Regimiento Aquino, a regiment composed by soldiers loyal to Rosas, who murdered their captain Pedro León Aquino and joined the Rosista army.

=== The Attackers (Urquiza and the Allies) ===
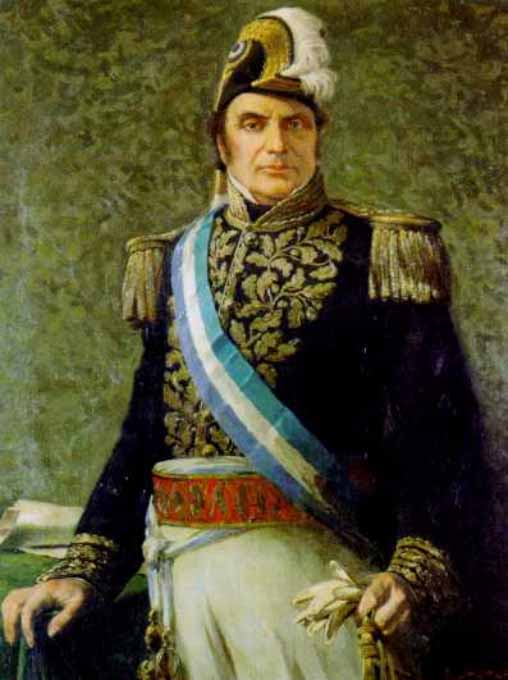
Justo José de Urquiza

Urquiza's army was 24,000-men strong, among them 3,500 Brazilians and 1,500 Uruguayans, and 50 guns. Among their ranks were people who would later become prominent figures, such as future presidents Bartolomé Mitre and Domingo Faustino Sarmiento. Most of the Argentine soldiers on this side were ill-disciplined, composed of gauchos rather than professional soldiers. Only the Brazilians were actually professional. Urquiza did not conduct the battle: each individual commander was free to fight as they saw fit.

=== Course of Battle ===
At the start of the battle, Urquiza read a proclamation to his troops:

Men! It has only been forty days since we crossed the rapids of the Paraná river on the Diamante, and we are already near the city of Buenos Aires, and facing our enemies, where we will now fight for freedom and glory!

Men! If a tyrant and his slaves await you, teach the world that you are invincible and that if the victory for a moment goes unrecognized by some of you, you will find your general on the battlefield, because it is on the battlefield that we will all meet as soldiers of an allied army, where we shall all prevail or die trying!

This is the duty that the name of our nation that we love has given to us.

Justo José de Urquiza.

The armies clashed in the proximities of the ranch of the Caseros family, in Buenos Aires province; the battlefield was located between the present-day railway stations of Caseros and Palomar. The area is now occupied by the Colegio Militar de la Nación (National Military College), a military academy.

Urquiza led a reckless charge against the Rosista left flank. Meanwhile, the Brazilian infantry, supported by a Uruguayan brigade and an Argentine cavalry squadron seized the Palomar, a circular building near the right of the Rosista line and used for pigeon breeding, still standing to this day. After both Rosista flanks collapsed only the center under Chilavert's command continued the fighting, reduced to an artillery duel. As the final hours of the battle became desperate, Chilavert ordered his men to collect ammunition dropped on the battlefield. Once they ran out of ammo, the Brazilian lines were free to advance on the hill, ending the battle.

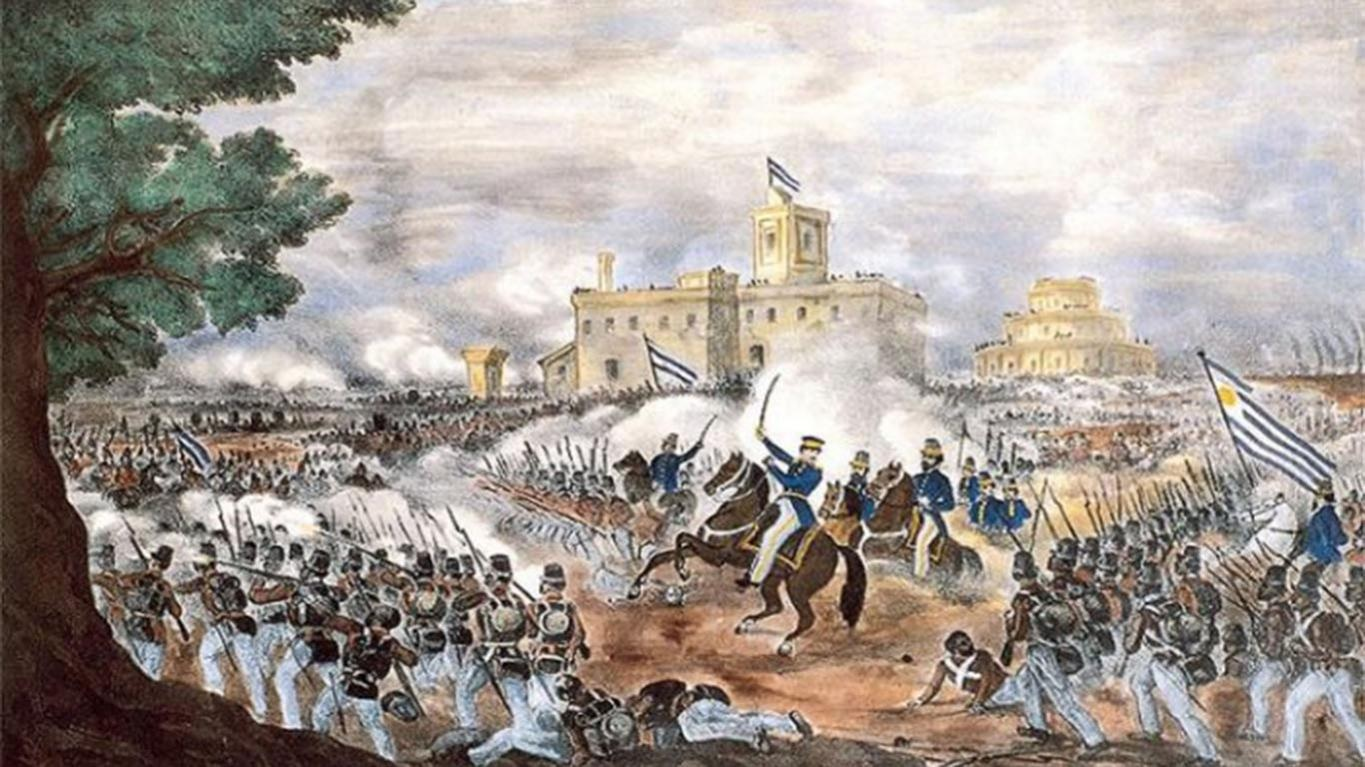
Battle of Caseros; in the background of the paintings is the Palomar, which still exists today.

In the end, the battle lasted for six hours and resulted in approximately 2,000 total casualties, 1,500 of which were Rosistas. On top of that, 7,000 more Rosista men were captured in combat. Remarkably, although this was a modern battle that lasted relatively long in a tight area, the casualties were relatively light for that era: only 4% of the troops who fought were killed or wounded in the fighting.

=== Death of Chilavert ===
As the battle concluded, despite being given several occasions to escape, Chilavert is said to have waited calmly by his cannon, awaiting the arrival of Urquiza. Upon his arrival, the two engaged in an argument: Urquiza recriminated him for his defection from the "anti-tyrannical" cause, while Chilavert retorted that the only traitor between them was Urquiza for requesting the help of Brazilians to attack his own country. Urquiza ordered that Chilavert be executed with his back facing a firing squad (a punishment reserved for traitors). However, when he was brought to the execution site, he began to fight his captors, demanding to be shot in the front and with an uncovered face. In the end, he was stabbed with bayonets and pummeled with rifle butts until he perished. His body went unburied for several days.

== Aftermath ==
Rosas, shot through the hand and left behind by his entourage, fled to Buenos Aires. In what is today the Plaza Garay, he wrote his resignation:

"I believe I have fulfilled my duty to my fellow citizens and friends. If we haven't been able to assert our independence, our identity, and our honor, it is because we hadn't been given the chance to do more."

A few hours later, protected by the British consul Robert Gore, Rosas boarded the British ship Centaur headed for exile in the United Kingdom.

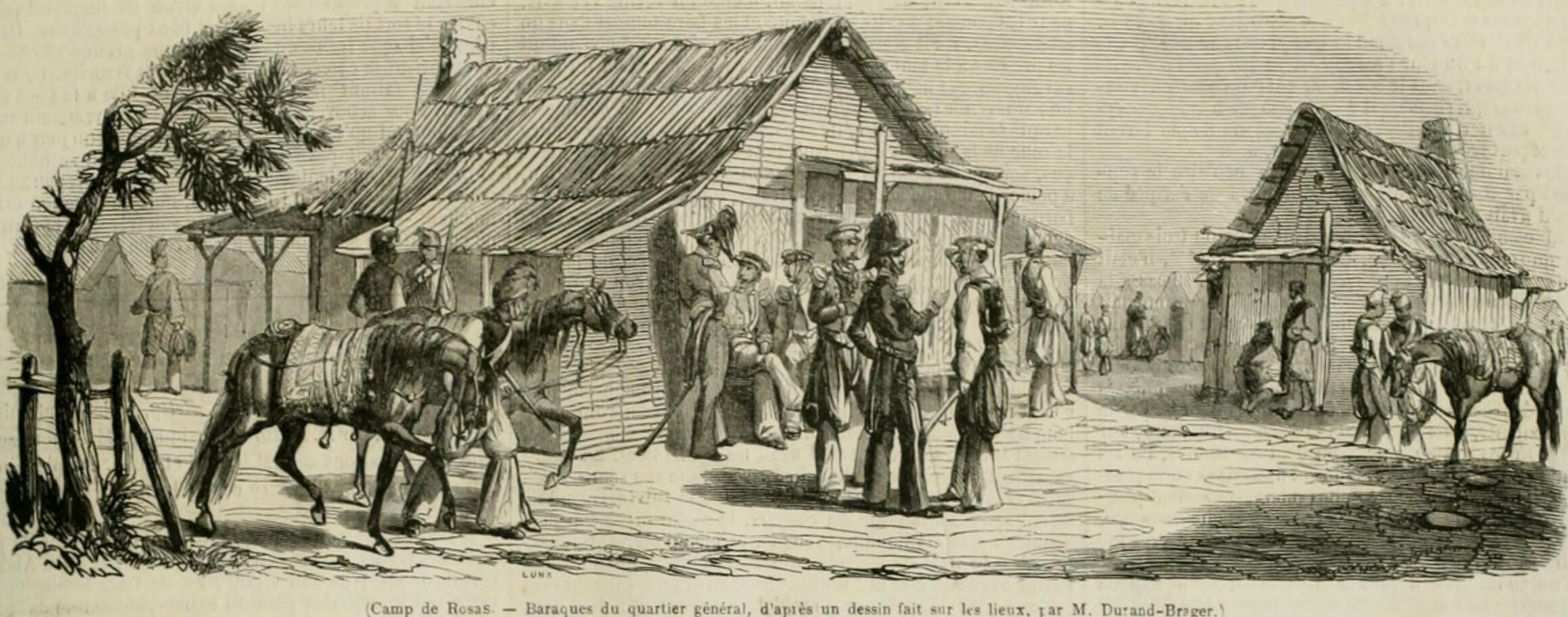
Inspection of one of the camps of Juan Manuel de Rosas' army, Jean-Baptiste Henri Durand-Brager, 1846

Survivors of the battle began to arrive at Buenos Aires at 11:00, announcing the devastating defeat. Immediately, the city had become leaderless, beginning a period of looting between different groups of vandals while the general Mansilla demonstrated his incapacity to contain them although he did allow troops from foreign fleets to enter the city in order to protect their own nations' citizens, diplomats, and properties. The looting continued until the day after the battle had already concluded. On the 5th of February, two days after the battle, at the request of foreign envoys, Urquiza ordered three battalions to establish order in the city.

15 days later, Urquiza arrived in the city, in a procession riding Rosas's own horse. Soon after, he was declared interim governor of Buenos Aires, by the position's previous holder, Vicente López y Planes.

On top of the execution of the colonel Martiniano Chilavert and various other Rosistas who perished on the battlefield, all the survivors of the Regimiento Aquino were executed by firing squad without trial, and their bodies dangled from trees of the Palermo de San Benito, the previous home of Rosas, now occupied by his enemies. Later on, many of the members of the Rosista repression squads known as the Mazorca were tried and executed, including Ciriaco Cuitiño and Leandro Antonio Alén. Alén was the father of Leandro N. Alem, later radical caudillo, and the grandfather of Hipólito Yrigoyen, later president of Argentina.

On top of forcing the resignation of Rosas, the battle placed the general Urquiza in a position of preeminence that had previously been held by Rosas. This allowed him to firmly reunite the disparate provinces under the central government and him as per the San Nicolás Agreement signed a few months after the battle, which called for a meeting of the General Constituent Assembly to write a new constitution the next year (the Argentine Constitution of 1853), the basis for the current constitution of Argentina. Nevertheless, the process of national unification would continue; civil wars would continue in the country until 1880.

Schenoni offers a different perspective on the battle's immediate consequences for state formation. He treats Caseros as a major international defeat of the Confederation, stressing the participation of Brazilian and Uruguayan forces alongside Urquiza. Although the battle opened the way for constitutional reorganization, its immediate aftermath also brought renewed political fragmentation. Buenos Aires separated from the Argentine Confederation, and national unity remained fragile into the following decade.

== Gallery ==
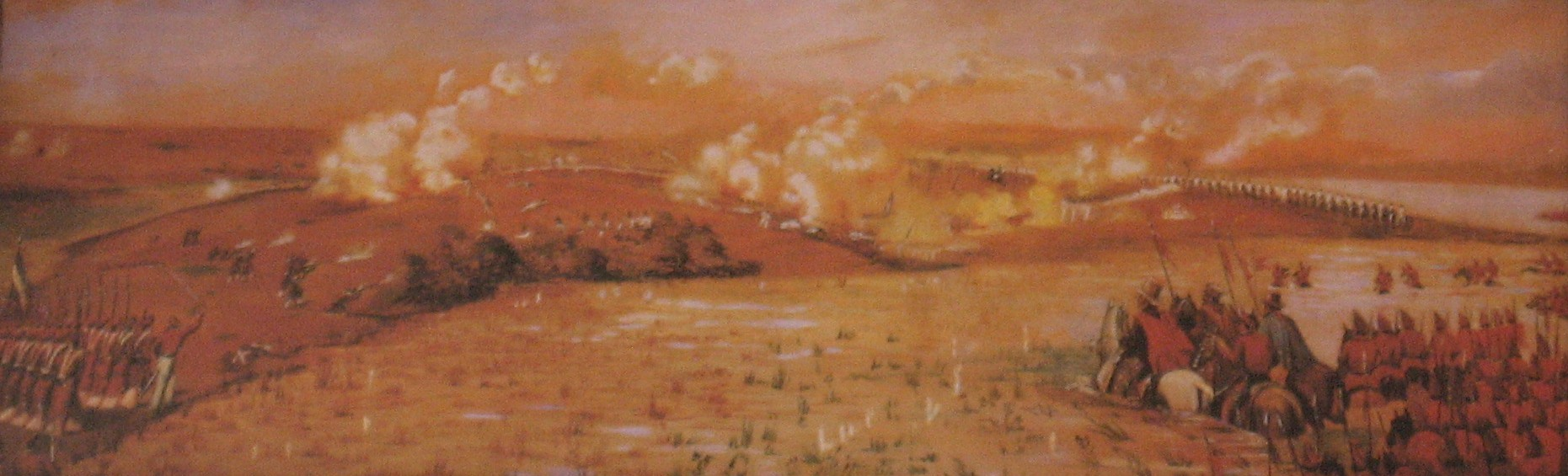

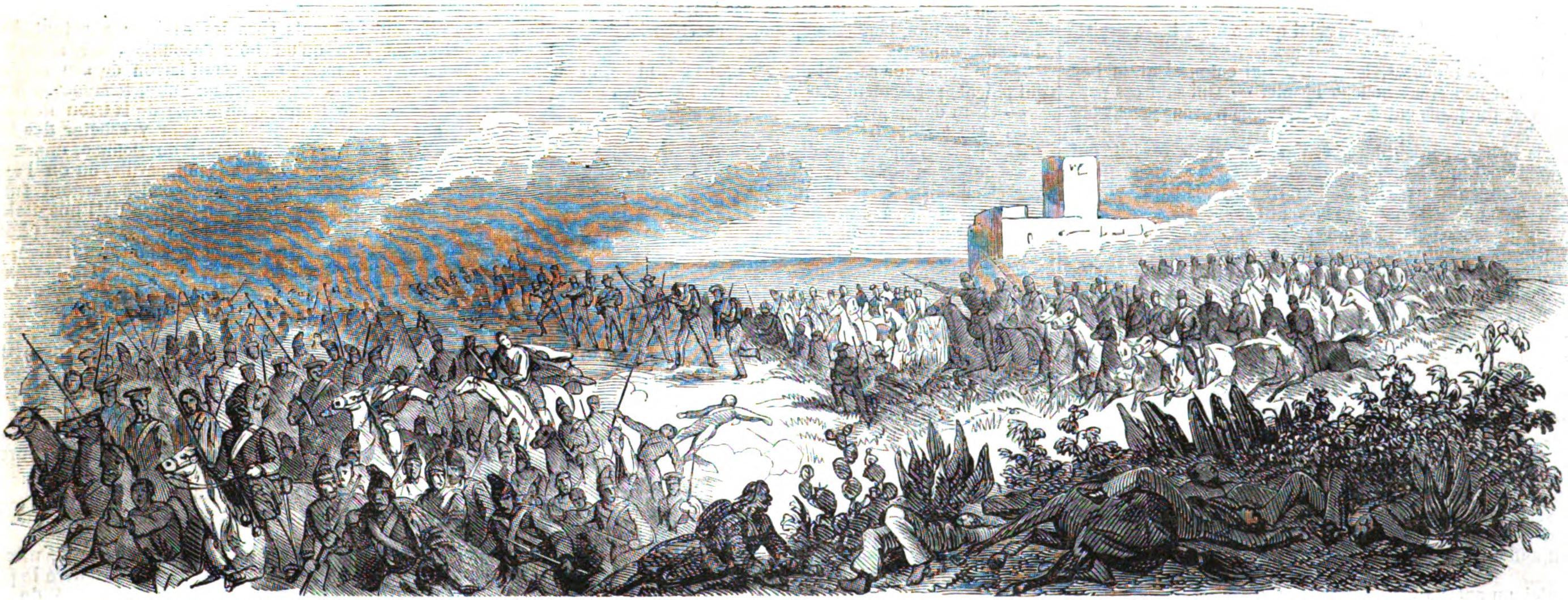

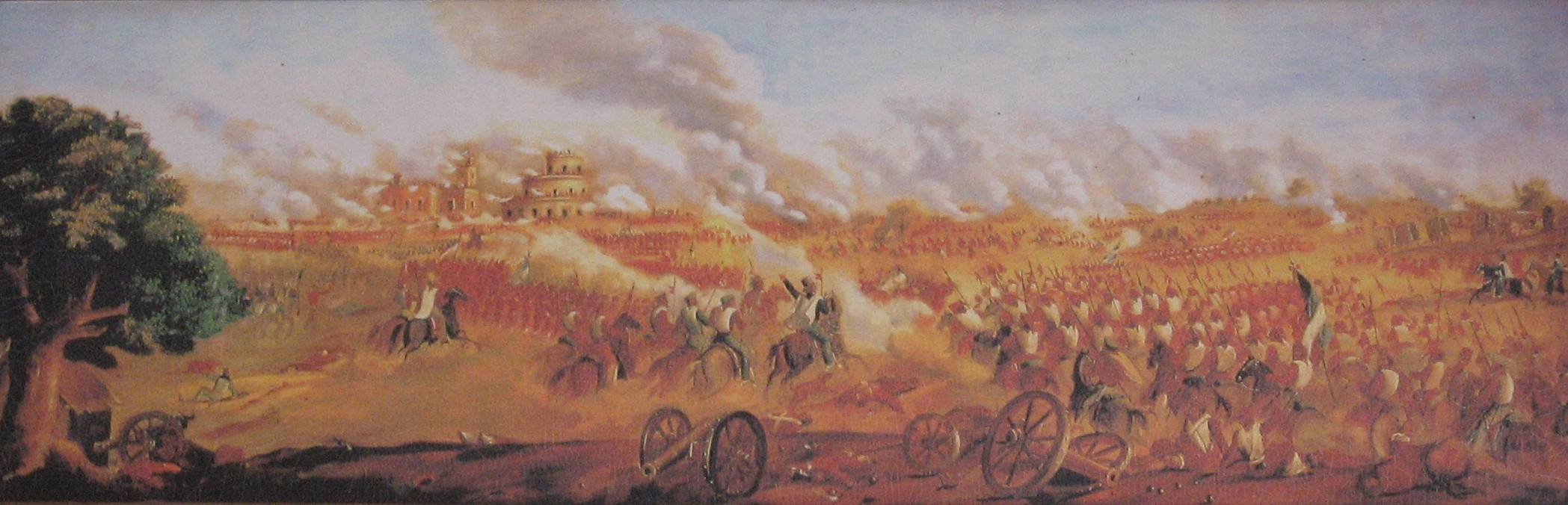

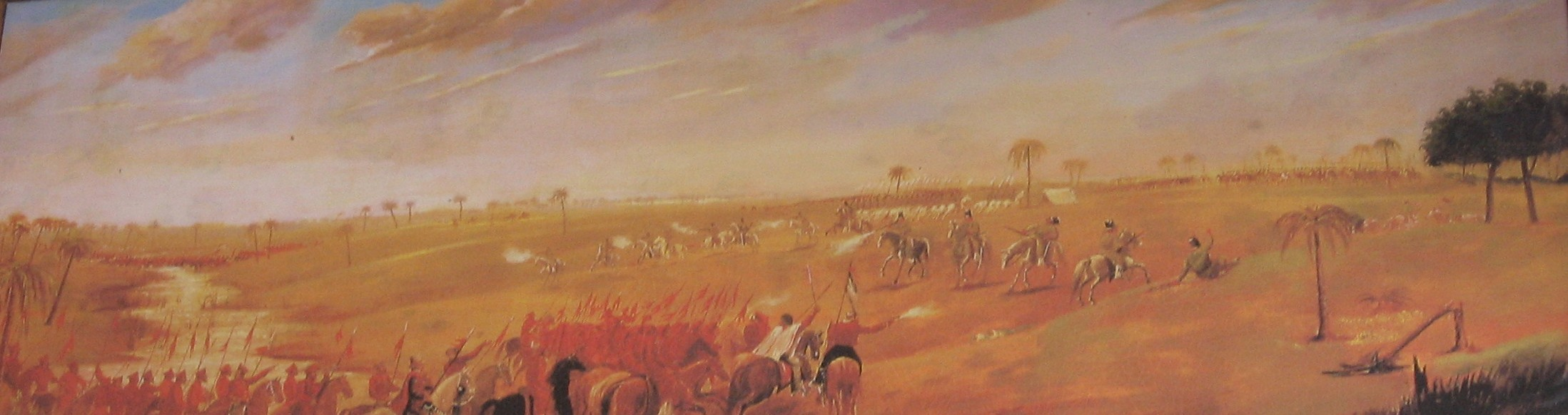

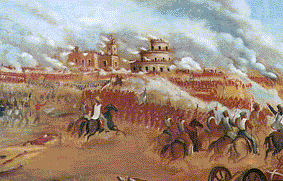

== Sources ==
- Gálvez, Manuel (1949). Vida de Juan Manuel de Rosas. Buenos Aires: Editorial Tor.
- Garcia, Rodolfo (2012). Obras do Barão do Rio Branco VI: efemérides brasileiras (in Portuguese). Brasília: Fundação Alexandre de Gusmão. ISBN 978-85-7631-357-1.
- De León, Pablo (2010). Historia de la Actividad Espacial en la Argentina (in Spanish). Buenos Aires: CPIAyE. ISBN 978-05-5701-782-9.
- Paredes, Daniel Alfredo (2010). Juan Bautista Alberdi y la unidad nacional: a 200 años de su nacimiento (in Spanish). Buenos Aires: Gobierno de la Ciudad de Buenos Aires. ISBN 978-98-7164-208-3.
- Díaz, Antonio (1878). Historia política y militar de las repúblicas del Plata desde el año de 1828 hasta el de 1866 (in Spanish). Montevideo: Imprenta de "El Siglo".
- Donato, Hernâni (1987). Dicionário das Batalhas Brasileiras (in Portuguese). São Paulo: Ibrasa.
- Academia Nacional de la Historia (2003). Nueva historia de la nación argentina. Tomo V. (in Spanish). Buenos Aires: Planeta. ISBN 97-8950-490-214-0.
- Acevedo, Pablo Blanco (1906). Historia de la República Oriental del Uruguay (in Spanish). Montevideo: Barreiro y Ramos.
- Cuestas, Juan Lindolfo (1898). Páginas sueltas. Tomo II (in Spanish). Montevideo: Dornaleche y Reyes.
- Best, Félix (1960). Historia de las guerras argentinas, de la independencia, internacionales, civiles y con el indio (in Spanish). Buenos Aires: Peuser.
