= Timoteo Aparicio =

Uruguayan Politician

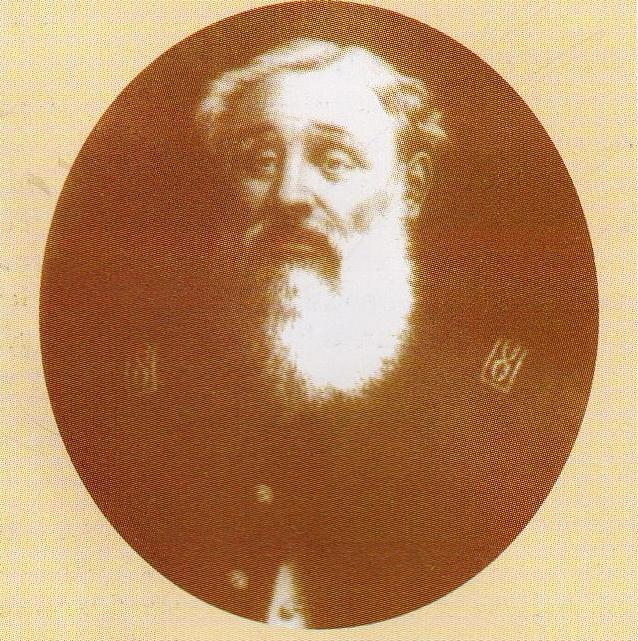
- Born: August 22, 1814; Canelón Grande, Viceroyalty of the Río de la Plata
- Died: September 9, 1882 (aged 68); Montevideo, Montevideo Department, Uruguay
- Military career
- Allegiance: Uruguay
- Branch: National Army of Uruguay
- Rank: General
- Conflicts: Uruguayan Civil War; Platine War; Uruguayan War: Battle of Jaguarão; Revolution of the Lances

Timoteo Aparicio (1814–1882) was a Uruguayan politician and military figure that was a member of the National Party, most notable for spearheading the Revolution of the Lances.

== Biography ==
He spent a good part of his life in the Florida Department and from there he defended the causes of the National Party, throughout the national territory. The Battle of Paso Severino was one of the most important events in his life as a revolutionary.

Their first confrontations took place with Manuel Oribe, in 1836 and later in the Great Siege of Montevideo, when the Great War and the Government of Cerrito .

During the presidency of Bernardo Prudencio Berro, he faced the forces of General Venancio Flores on several occasions. After the triumph of Flores in 1865, the white caudillo emigrated to Entre Ríos Province, Argentina. He returned in 1870, crossing the Uruguay River at the height of Gualeguaychú, to start the Revolution of the Lances, named after the weapon that he'd prefer using. In Paso Severino, between the current towns of Mendoza Chico and 25 de Mayo and on September 12 of that year, he faced forces loyal to President Lorenzo Batlle, who was defeated and successfully overthrown. The Convention of April 6, 1872 put an end to this armed struggle and led to cooperation between the Colorados and Nationals.

In January 1875, when the constitutional President José Eugenio Ellauri was overthrown, the National Party, headed by General Timoteo Aparicio, offered to restore it but was rejected.

The continuous armed struggles in which he participated forced him to abandon his job, in addition to having mortgaged his house and lands in favor of the revolutionary cause. In times of peace he was a very appreciated and supportive neighbor, dedicating himself to working the land with his own hands to survive; He ended his days in the midst of poverty, and after a painful ailment.

He was admired by co-religionists and political adversaries for his military achivements, which led to his promotion to the rank of General by a Colorado Party government, which he opposed.

In 2010, Aparicio's remains were moved from La Paz to the pantheon of the unknown soldier in the city of Florida.
