= Economy of Uruguay =

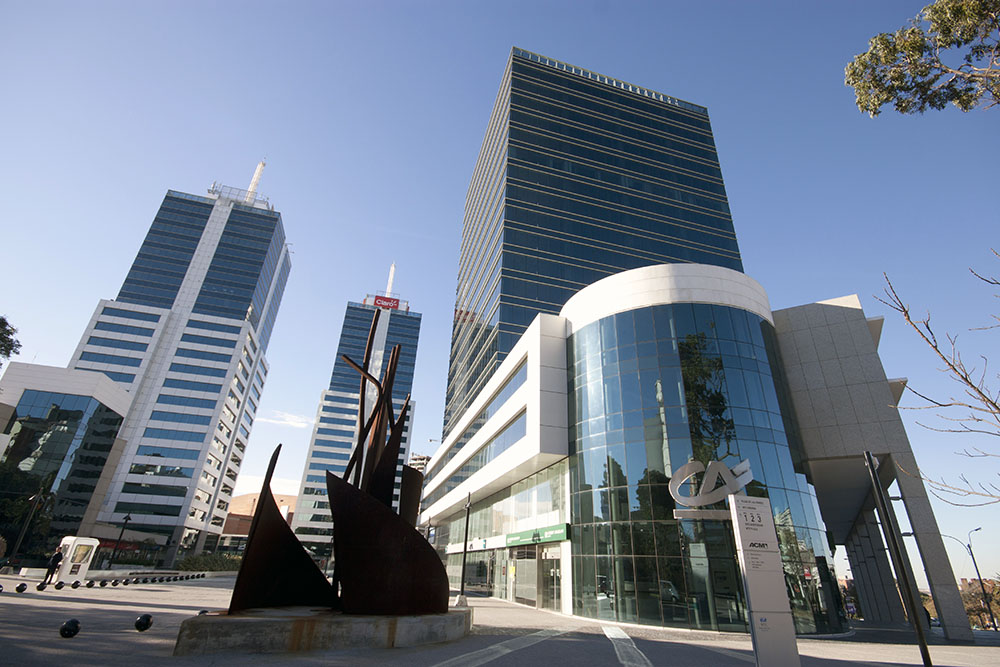
- World Trade Center Montevideo
- Currency: Uruguayan peso (UYU, $U)
- Fiscal year: Calendar year
- Trade organisations: WTO, ALADI, Mercosur, Andean Community (associate)
- Country group: Developing/Emerging; High-income economy; High-income industrial economy

Statistics
- Population: ▼3,444,263 (2023)
- GDP: ▲$96.1 billion (nominal; 2026); ▲$135.8 billion (PPP; 2026)
- GDP rank: 82nd (nominal; 2025); 95th (PPP; 2025)
- GDP growth: 1.8% (2025)
- GDP per capita: ▲$27,608 (nominal; 2026); ▲$39,030 (PPP; 2026)
- GDP per capita rank: 51st (nominal; 2026); 57th (PPP; 2026)
- GDP per capita growth: 3.2% (2024)
- GDP by sector: agriculture: 6.4%; industry: 16.8%; services: 65.3%; (2024 est.)
- Inflation (CPI): ▼3.96% (April 2024)
- Population below national poverty line: ▼9.1% (2022)
- Gini coefficient: ▼40 medium (2024, World Bank)
- Human Development Index: ▲0.862 very high (2023) (48th); ▲0.747 high (53rd) IHDI (2023)
- Labour force: ▼1,686,487 (2020); ▼54.9% employment rate (February 2021)
- Labour force by occupation: agriculture: 8%; industry: 18.8%; services: 73,2%; (2025 est.)
- Unemployment: ▼7.8% (July 2023)
- Main industries: food processing, electrical machinery, transportation equipment, petroleum products, textiles, chemicals, beverages

External
- Exports: ▲$12.845 billion (2024)
- Export goods: beef, soybeans, cellulose, rice, wheat, wood, dairy products, wool
- Main export partners: China 24%; Brazil 18%; European Union 14%; United States 9%; Argentina 5%; Turkey 4%; (2024)
- Imports: ▲$ 10.875 billion (2024)
- Import goods: refined oil, crude oil, passenger and other transportation vehicles, vehicle parts, cellular phones
- Main import partners: China 30%; Brazil 25%; European Union 13%; Argentina 12%; (2024)
- FDI stock: ▲$44.84 billion (31 December 2017 est.); ▲ Abroad: $19.97 billion (31 December 2017 est.)
- Current account: ▲$879 million (2017 est.)
- Gross external debt: ▲$28.37 billion (31 December 2017 est.)

Public finance
- Government debt: ▼57.4% of GDP (2022 est.) (Note: Data cover general government debt, and include debt instruments issued (or owned) by government entities other than the treasury; the data include treasury debt held by foreign entities; the data include debt issued by subnational entities, as well as intra-governmental debt; intra-governmental debt consists of treasury borrowings from surpluses in the social funds, such as for retirement, medical care, and unemployment; debt instruments for the social funds are not sold at public auctions.)
- Foreign reserves: ▲$15.96 billion (31 December 2017 est.)
- Budget balance: −3.5% (of GDP) (2017 est.)
- Revenue: 17.66 billion (2017 est.)
- Spending: 19.72 billion (2017 est.)
- Credit rating: Standard & Poor's: BB (Domestic); BB (Foreign); BBB+ (T&C Assessment); Outlook: Stable; Moody's: Ba1; Outlook: Stable; Fitch: BB; Outlook: Positive
- All values, unless otherwise stated, are in US dollars.

Historical GDP per capita development

The economy of Uruguay features an export-oriented agricultural sector and a well-educated workforce, along with high levels of social spending. Tourism and banking are also prominent sectors; Uruguay acts as a regional hub for international finance and tourism. The country also has a history and representation of advanced workers-rights protection, with unions and the eight-hour work-day protected at the beginning of the 20th century.

90% of the country's population is urbanized, while most of the industry and over half of the population is concentrated in the capital Montevideo.

After averaging growth of 5% annually during 1996–98, Uruguay's economy suffered a major downturn in 1999–2002, stemming largely from the spillover effects of the economic problems of its large neighbors; Argentina and Brazil. In 2001–02, Argentine citizens made massive withdrawals of dollars deposited in Uruguayan banks after bank deposits in Argentina were frozen, which led to a plunge in the Uruguayan peso, causing the 2002 Uruguay banking crisis.

== History ==
=== Pre-independence ===
In the decades leading up to Uruguay's independence (1825), there was a sustained rise in average wealth in Montevideo, wealth inequality declined, and the economy showed signs of growing more complex and urban-oriented.

=== 19th century ===
In the 19th century, the country had similar characteristics to other Latin American countries: caudillismo, civil wars and permanent instability (40 revolts between 1830 and 1903), foreign capitalism's control of important sectors of the economy, a high percentage of illiterate people (more than half the population in 1900). Among foreign investments, investors from Great Britain controlled 22% of the land and many majors parts of the industrial infrastructure, including meatpacking and leather industry, infrastructure for water and gas, and transport systems like trolley and 1100 miles of rail.

In 1857, the first nationally owned bank, Banco Comercial, was founded.

=== Reforms after Batlle ===
José Batlle y Ordóñez, President from 1903 to 1907 and again from 1911 to 1915, set the pattern for Uruguay's modern political development and dominated the political scene until he died in 1929. Batlle introduced widespread political, social, and economic reforms such as a welfare program, government participation in many facets of the economy, and a new constitution.

Batlle nationalized foreign-owned companies and created a modern social welfare system. Income tax for lower incomes was abolished in 1905, secondary schools established in every city (1906), telephone network nationalized, unemployment benefits were introduced (1914), eight-hour working day introduced (1915), etc. By 1929, 84% of manufacturing was concentrated in a handful of industries: meatpacking, leather and wool. Industrial policies further encouraging migration from rural to urban communities, as well as waves of immigrants from southern and eastern Europe. Investment in urban infrastructure in Montevideo and a growing economy, was capped by hosting the first 1930 FIFA World Cup.

Claudio Williman who served between Batlle's two terms was his supporter and continued all his reforms, as did the next President Baltasar Brum (1919–1923). Around 1900 infant mortality rates (IMR) in Uruguay were among the world's lowest, indicating a very healthy population.

The Great Depression ended an era of export-led economic growth in Uruguay.

=== Mid-20th century ===
The Uruguay economy shifted from an agriculture-dominated economy to an industrial economy from the period 1930 to 1955. This shift led to a sluggish economy, as Uruguay neglected its comparative advantage, diverting resources away from a productive agricultural sector to an inefficient, unproductive manufacturing sector. The government sought to bolster its manufacturing sector with import substitution industrialization, disincentivizing imports. From the 1950s onwards, the Uruguayan economy was in decline.

Anthropology professor Daniel Renfrew describes the 50s, 60s and dictatorship period (70s and 80s) as economic downturn periods, followed by further economic degradation caused by neoliberalism. Economist Jamie Mezzera disagrees with this interpretation, arguing that between 1968 and 1972, Uruguay was one of the most regulated capitalist economies in the world. In this period, the government massively increased import tariffs and had near-total wage and price controls. The government instituted these policies to avoid the political pressure that would come if they were to devalue their currency. Between 1955 and 1972, economic output in Uruguay stagnated. After the price and wage controls were largely removed in 1973, growth increased by 4.3% per year until 1979.

The policies of the Colorado Party under Julio María Sanguinetti and Jorge Batlle during the 90s and early 2000s, following global trends of neo-liberalization, facilitated a shift from manufacturing and small-scale agriculture, towards increasing monoculture agriculture and services like finance and tourism. However, these policies faded as the regional economic problems in Argentina and Brazil caused a downturn and unemployment from 1998 to 2003. The economic and social crises that followed allowed for the election of the Broad Front a leftist coalition against the neoliberal policies.

== Currency ==
Uruguay has a partially dollarized economy. As of August 2008 almost 60% of bank loans use United States dollars, but most transactions use the Uruguayan peso. Today, the Uruguayan peso is minted in coins of 1, 2, 5, 10, and 50 pesos and in banknotes of 20, 50, 100, 200, 500, 1000, and 2000 pesos.

== Sectors ==
=== Agriculture, livestock and forestry ===
Throughout Uruguay's history, their strongest exporting industries have been agricultural livestock products such as beef. In the case of beef exports, they have been boosted since Uruguay joined the Mercosur agreement in 1991 and the country has been able trade with more distant markets, such as Japan. In 2018, it produced 589 thousand tons of beef. Worldwide, livestock production is one of the fastest growing agricultural industries. Uruguay has a long history of livestock production, with 70-80% of the land being devoted to pastures, both natural and cultivated; and since 1960, the production has doubled. The works and yards at the Fray Bentos factory complex in Fray Bentos, Uruguay was ranked among the largest industrial complexes in South America and helped usher in the industrial revolution there, with the city of Fray Bentos grew simultaneously with the factory. The plant played a major role in the development of Uruguay's cattle sector, which is still one of the country's main sources of export products.

In 2018, the country produced 1.36 million tons of rice, 1.33 million tons of soy, 816 thousand tons of maize, 637 thousand tons of barley, 440 thousand tons of wheat, 350 thousand tons of sugar cane, 106 thousand tons of orange, 104 thousand tons of grape, 90 thousand tons of rapeseed, 87 thousand tons of potato, 76 thousand tons of sorghum, 71 thousand tons of tangerine, 52 thousand tons of oats, 48 thousand tons of apple, in addition to smaller yields of other agricultural products.

As timber refining is being kept within the country, forestry has become a growth industry in recent years, which has affected the fertility of Uruguayan meadows.

=== Energy ===
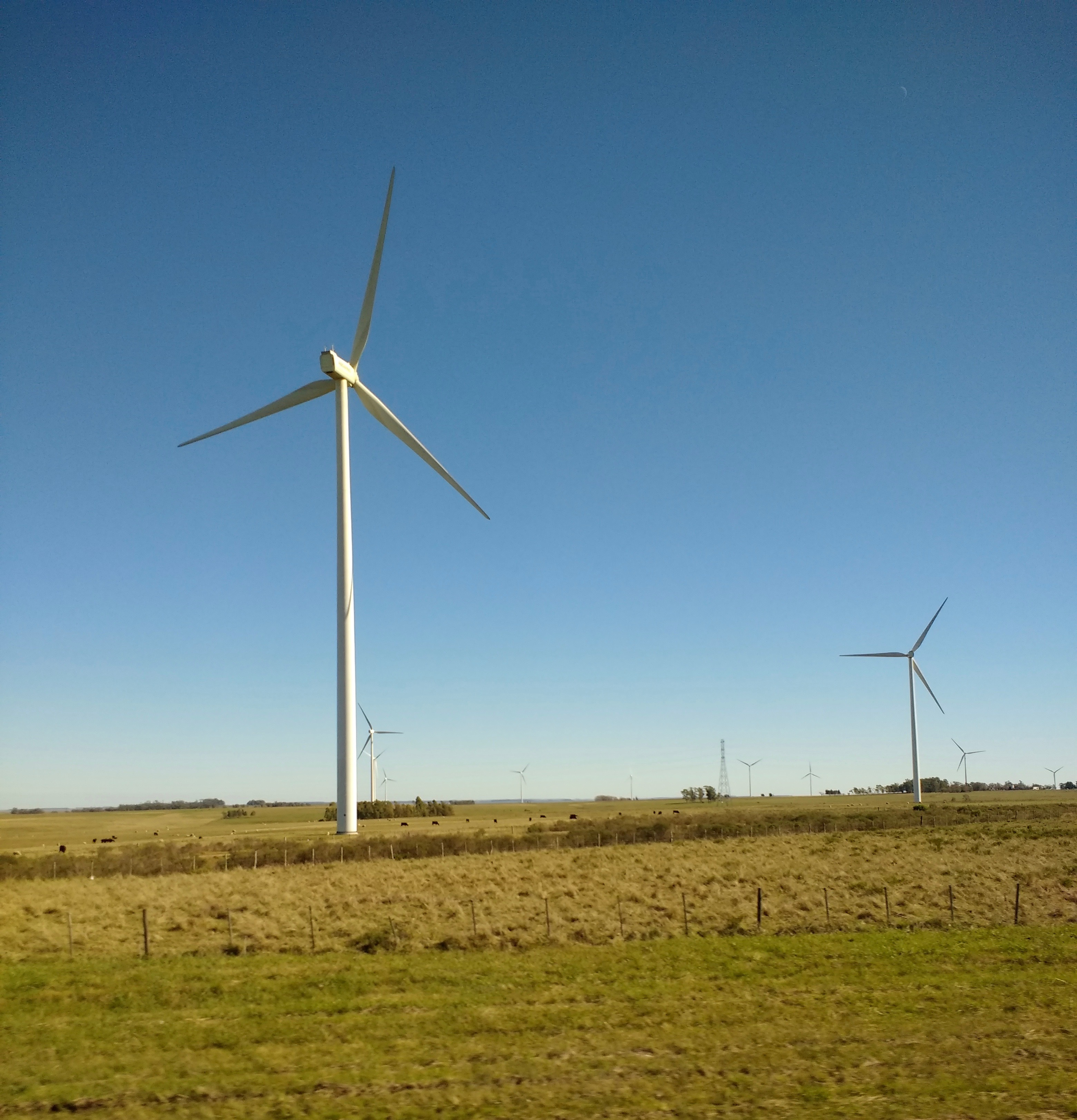
Wind turbines in Tacuarembó Department

Energy in Uruguay describes energy and electricity production, consumption and import in Uruguay. As part of climate mitigation measures and an energy transformation, Uruguay has converted over 98% of its electrical grid to sustainable energy sources (primarily solar, wind, and hydro). Fossil fuels are primarily imported into Uruguay for transportation, industrial uses and applications like domestic cooking. Four hydroelectric dams provide much of the country's energy supply.

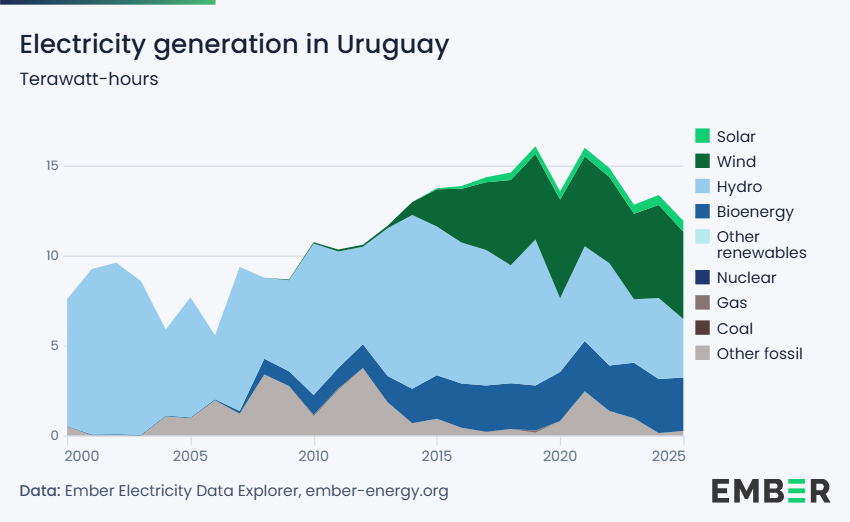

The electricity sector of Uruguay has traditionally been based on domestic hydropower along with thermal power plants, and reliant on imports from Argentina and Brazil at times of peak demand. Investments in renewable energy sources such as wind power and solar power over the preceding 10 years allowed the country to cover 98% of its electricity needs with renewable energy sources by 2025.

Hydropower provides a large percentage of installed production capacity in Uruguay, almost all of it produced by four hydroelectric facilities, three on the Rio Negro and one, the Salto Grande dam shared with Argentina, on the Uruguay River. The production from these hydropower sources is dependent on seasonal rainfall patterns, but under normal hydrological conditions, can supply off-peak domestic demand.

Thermal power from fossil fuel fired power plants, activated during peak demand, is used to provide the remaining installed production capacity. Generation from fossil fuel decreased substantially in recent years, with renewables accounting for 98% of electricity generation by 2025. Thermal power from biomass also provides additional power generation capacity.

A shift to renewable energy sources was achieved thanks to modernization efforts, based on legal and regulatory reforms in 1997, 2002, and 2006, which led to large new investments in electrical production capacity including from the private sector. Purchasing agreement offered by the government in the final reform in 2006 incentivized a rapid growth of sustainable energy capacity in the country. Wind power capacity has gone from negligible in 2012 to 10% of installed capacity by 2014. A new combined cycle power plant which can run on either gas or oil has been installed. A number of photovoltaic solar power plants have been built. Additionally, a new electrical grid interconnection has improved the ability to import or export electricity with Brazil.

=== Mining ===
The mining sector contributes only 0.1% to the GDP of Uruguay. Uruguay's mineral commodities include clays, semiprecious gemstones, gold, iron and steel, sand and gravel, and stone. Uruguay has no proven natural gas or oil reserves but it does have substantial hydroelectric capacity.

Artigas Department is well known for its amethyst and agate quartz varieties mining. During 2010s 20 thousand tons of minerals were extracted with a value of 9 million US dollars, exported to Germany, United States, Brazil and China.

Prospecting in the Atlantic coast of Uruguay for fossil fuels, however it has been a controversial practice sparking considerable environmental and social concerns.

=== Oil and gas ===
Uruguay is a petroleum importing country, and most of the industry is controlled by the state-owned company ANCAP. ANCAP operates both the only refinery in Uruguay, La Teja Refinery, and the distribution of gas within the country.

In 2025, the government authorised projects submitted by seismic exploration companies on Uruguay's offshore platform. Environmental NGOs oppose these projects and are taking legal action to prevent their implementation, considering them harmful to the environment.

=== Plastics ===
In 2011, plastics were the second-largest non-agricultural industrial export of the country.

=== Banking and finance ===
There are three stock exchanges in Uruguay. The oldest is the Montevideo Stock Exchange (BVM), founded in 1867 and seated in Montevideo. Its goals are, among others, to provide their members the means to trade securities through public auctions, promote the development of the finance market according to its role as a stock exchange, and to set up the self regulation and self discipline of the stock markets within the legal framework. On 15 January 1993 the Electronic Stock Exchange (BEVSA) was established with the purpose of having a more direct and agile area to trade compared with that of the BVM at that time. In 2012 the first futures exchange, UFEX was established and in 2014 was authorized to work as a exchange by the Central Bank of Uruguay, with the goal to provide instruments for price hedging trading futures and options.

=== Education ===
Education in Uruguay is mandatory for a total of fourteen years, which includes two years of pre-primary education, six years of primary education, and six years of secondary education. It begins at the preschool level and is provided free of charge from pre-primary through university. In 1996, Uruguay had a gross primary enrollment rate of 111.7% and a net primary enrollment rate of 92.9%. "Data on primary school attendance rates in Uruguay were not available as of 2001.

=== Healthcare ===
For the first half of the twentieth century Uruguay and Argentina had the most advanced standards of medical care in Latin America. Military rule from 1973 to 1985 adversely affected standards in Uruguay. More resources went to military hospitals, which were open only to relatives of the members of the armed forces. Total health care spending in 1984 was 8.1% of GDP, and this included about 7.5% of household spending but 400,000 people had neither state nor private health care coverage. In 1987 there were seven major public hospitals in Montevideo. About half the interior departments had a hospital; the others had a centro auxiliar. Altogether there were about 9,505 hospital beds in the public a monthly membership fee and a small co-payment payable to see a doctor or have a test. There may be age and pre-existing condition guidelines for accepting or not accepting non-employed members. 58.9% of the inhabitants of Montevideo were covered by mutualistas in 1971 and 11.8% had the official health card from the Ministry of Public Health which entitled them to free health care. 16.6% had no coverage of any kind.

The current Uruguayan healthcare system is the State Health Services Administration (ASSE) created in 1987. The National Healthcare Fund (FONASA) is the financial entity responsible for collecting, managing and distributing the money that the state has destined for health in the country. It was created in 2007 to entitle all employees and pensioners to health care outside of the public health system. Latest government figures state that there are 2.5 million people registered with Fonasa – out of a total population of just over 3 million. This would mean that 500,000 Uruguayans are left choosing between the public system or having to pay the full amount for private health care.

=== Software ===
During the last decades the software industry has developed considerably. Many start-ups have been very successful, such is the case of PedidosYa and DLocal. Uruguay also exports software; the similar geographic longitude to that of the United States makes it attractive for companies to outsource software development to Uruguayan companies. Other notable Uruguayan software enterprises are: Genexus, Códigos del Sur, Overactive. In 2026, an agreement was made for a 500 MW data center complex and 350 MW solar power.

=== Telecommunications ===
Despite having poor levels of investment in the fixed-line sector, the small size of Uruguay's population has enabled them to attain one of the highest telecommunication density levels in South America. The teledensity was already the second highest in the continent in the 1990s (after French Guiana) and the highest in 2001. Reaching a peak of 162.077 in 2014, the density declined in subsequent years, yet it was still 136.921 as of 2021. Mobile penetration was the second highest in Latin America (after Panama) as of 2022. Furthermore, the country already achieved a 100% digitalization of main lines by 1999.

The telecommunications sector is partially under a state monopoly through the public company ANTEL, including a monopoly on landline telephony. While this sector was privatized in many Latin American countries during the 1990s, Uruguay managed to keep telecommunications in public hands, partially under pressure from popular opinion through referendums. However, steps have been made to introduce liberalization and to allow for the entry of more private firms into the cellular sector. In 2022, under Luis Lacalle Pou, Uruguay authorized five cable companies into the fixed broadband internet sector.

=== Tourism ===
In 2013, travel and tourism accounted for 9.4% of the country's GDP. Their tourist industry is mainly characterized for attracting visitors from neighboring countries. Currently Uruguay's major attraction is the interior, particularly located in the region around Punta del Este.

=== Transport ===
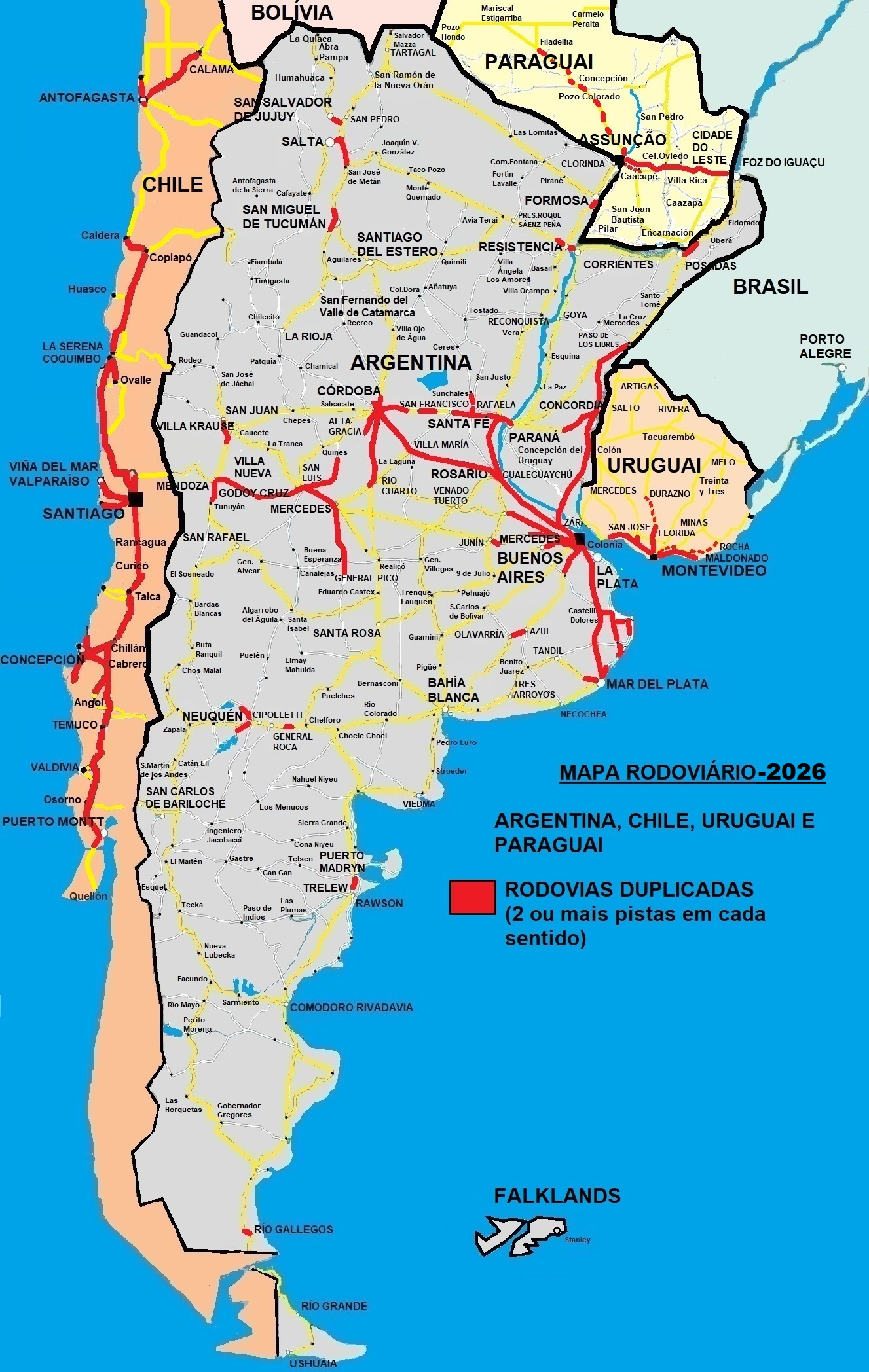
Road system in South America, with divided highways highlighted in red.

The transport network in Uruguay consists of 1,673 km of rail network, 7,743 km of paved roads, 1,600 km of navigable waterways, and 11 airports with paved roads.

=== Water supply and sanitation ===
Uruguay is the only country in Latin America that has achieved quasi-universal coverage of access to safe drinking water supply and adequate sanitation. Water service quality is considered good, with practically all localities in Uruguay receiving disinfected water on a continuous basis. 70% of wastewater collected by the national utility was treated. Given these achievements, the government's priority is to improve the efficiency of services and to expand access to sewerage, where appropriate, in areas where on-site sanitation is used.

The stability of the water supply in Uruguay was severely challenged by a three year drought culminating in a water crises in 2022-2023. The La Niña driven cycle of drought, amplified by increased heatwaves caused by climate change meant that overuse of water by consumers stressed capacity of the system, leading to use of saltwater in drinking water.

== Specialties ==
- Cattle were introduced to Uruguay before its independence by Hernando Arias de Saavedra, the Spanish Governor of Buenos Aires in 1603. Beef exports in 2006 amounted to around 37% of Uruguayan exports.
- Wool is a traditional product exported mainly to America, followed by the UK and India.
- Milk and dairy products. Conaprole, National Cooperative of Milk Producers is the main exporter of dairy products in Latin America (in 2006). The area of the country dedicated to dairy food is located mainly in the southwest.
- Rice. Fine varieties are produced in the lowlands in the east of the country close to Merin lake on the Uruguay-Brazil border. The national company Saman claims to be the main exporter in Latin America. Countries it exports to include Brazil, Iran, Peru, South Africa, Chile, Senegal, Argentina, Paraguay, Bolivia, Ecuador, USA, Canada and China.
- Tourism: Several seaside resorts, like Punta del Este or Punta del Diablo in the south-eastern departments of Maldonado and Rocha, regarded as a jet-set resort in South America, are main attractions of Uruguay. International cruises call at Montevideo from October to March every year. Also, Uruguay hosts many year-round international conferences. (The original GATT Uruguay Round concerning trade was, as its name suggests, hosted in Uruguay). Montevideo is home to the headquarters (secretariat) of [Mercosur], the Common Market of the South, whose full members are Uruguay, Argentina, Brazil, Paraguay and Venezuela, associate members Bolivia, Chile, Colombia, Ecuador and Peru.
- Software and consulting. Uruguay's well-educated workforce and lower-than-international wages have put Uruguay on the IT map. A product named GeneXus, originally created in Uruguay by a company called ArTech, is noteworthy. Other important developers and consultants include De Larrobla & Asociados, Greycon and Quanam. Tata Consultancy Services has its headquarters for the Spanish speaking world in Uruguay.

"With a population of only three million, Uruguay has rapidly become Latin America's outsourcing hub. In partnership with one of India's largest technology consulting firms, engineers in Montevideo work while their counterparts in Mumbai sleep." - The New York Times, September 22, 2006.

- Banking Services. Banking has traditionally been one of the strongest service export sectors in the country. Uruguay was once dubbed "the Switzerland of America", mainly for its banking sector and stability. The largest bank in Uruguay is Banco República, or BROU, which is state-owned; another important state bank is the BHU. Almost 20 private banks, most of the branches of international banks, operate in the country (Banco Santander, ABN AMRO, Citibank, among others). There is also a myriad of brokers and financial-services bureaus, among them Ficus Capital, Galvin Sociedad de Bolsa, Europa Sociedad de Bolsa, Darío Cukier, GBU, Hordeñana & Asociados Sociedad de Bolsa, etc. Uruguay has fully recovered from the financial crisis that caused a run on its banks.
- Public Sector: The state in Uruguay has an important role in the economy, Uruguay resisted the trend of privatization in Utilities and state-owned enterprises in the region. Several Referendums supported the state being in control of the most important utilities and energy companies. Some of the companies have a full monopoly warranted by law (like landline telephony, water), others compete freely with private operators (Insurance, mobile telephony, Banks). Most of them are dominant in the local market. There is strong debate in the Uruguayan society about their role and future. Some of them contributed to the Uruguay state treasury.
  - The most important state-owned companies are: Republica AFAP (Pension Fund), AFE (Railways), ANCAP (Energy), ANCO (Mail), Administracion Nacional de Puertos (Ports), ANTEL (Telecommunications: Telephony, Mobiles (ANCEL and Data ANTELDATA)), BHU (Mortgage Bank), BROU (Bank), BSE (Insurance), OSE (Water & Sewage), UTE (Electricity). These companies operate under public law, using a legal entity defined in the Uruguayan Constitution called 'Ente Autonomo' (Meaning Autonomic Entity). The government also owns parts of other companies operating under private law like the National Airline Carrier PLUNA and others owned totally or partially by the CND National Development Corporation.

== Poverty ==
By 2022, 9.1% of the population remains under the poverty line. Due to this, it is one of the South American countries with the lowest poverty rate.

Income poverty in Uruguay, historically low by regional standards, had increased substantially during that country's struggle with chronic stagflation from the 1960s until the mid-1980s; from 1986 to 1999, however, income poverty declined sharply, from 46% to 15%. Fallout from an earlier financial crisis in neighboring Argentina helped lead to a resurgence in poverty, to 27%, by 2006, though by 2008, a reduction of the rate to around 24% was measured, while 2.2% of the population remained in absolute poverty; as in many other nations, the poor in Uruguay suffer from far higher rates of unemployment than the population at large (27%, compared to an average of 7.5%). The rate of absolute poverty in Uruguay, measured as part of the UN Human Development Index, was 3.0% in 2009, and was the lowest in Latin America.

== Social security and welfare ==
Banco de Previsión Social (Spanish for 'Social Insurance Bank') is the state-owned Uruguayan social security institute. Institutionalized in the Constitution of 1967, it is in charge of coordinating, organizing and executing state social welfare and social security services.

== International trade ==
Exports of Uruguay by product category (2019) Chemical products Transportation Machines Mineral products Plastics and rubbers Metals Foodstuffs Precious metals Textiles Instruments Animal products Vegetable products Paper goods Footwear and headwear Miscellaneous Stone and glass Wood products Animal and vegetable bi-products Animal hides Arts and antiques Weapons

=== Trade agreements ===
Agreement	Partner(s)	Signed	Effective	Status
Mercosur	Argentina, Brazil, Paraguay, Uruguay	November 1991	November 1991	Currently in force (Free Trade Agreements / Economic Complementation Agreements)
ECA N.º 36 MERCOSUR	Bolivia	December 1996	February 1997	Currently in force (Free Trade Agreements / Economic Complementation Agreements)
FTA	Mexico	November 2003	July 2004	Currently in force (Free Trade Agreements / Economic Complementation Agreements)
ECA N.º 59	Ecuador	October 2004	April 2005	Currently in force (Free Trade Agreements / Economic Complementation Agreements)
ECA N.º 58 MERCOSUR	Peru	August 2005	December 2005	Currently in force (Free Trade Agreements / Economic Complementation Agreements)
ECA N.º 62 MERCOSUR	Cuba	July 2006	September 2008	Currently in force (Free Trade Agreements / Economic Complementation Agreements)
Commercial Preference Agreement MERCOSUR	India	January 2004	June 2009	Currently in force (Free Trade Agreements / Economic Complementation Agreements)
FTA MERCOSUR	Israel	December 2007	December 2009	Currently in force (Free Trade Agreements / Economic Complementation Agreements)
Partial Agreement N.º 63	Venezuela	December 2012	March 2013	Currently in force (Free Trade Agreements / Economic Complementation Agreements)
Commercial Preference Agreement MERCOSUR	SACU	September 2011	April 2016	Currently in force (Free Trade Agreements / Economic Complementation Agreements)
FTA MERCOSUR	Egypt	December 2015	September 2017	Currently in force (Free Trade Agreements / Economic Complementation Agreements)
ECA N.º 72 MERCOSUR	Colombia	July 2017	December 2017	Currently in force (Free Trade Agreements / Economic Complementation Agreements)
FTA	Chile	October 2016	December 2018	Currently in force (Free Trade Agreements / Economic Complementation Agreements)
FTA MERCOSUR	State of Palestine	December 2011	—	Concluded (not in force)

== Data ==
The following table shows the main economic indicators in 1980–2021 (with IMF staff estimates in 2022–2027). Inflation below 10% is in green.

Year	GDP (in Bil. US$PPP)	GDP per capita (in US$ PPP)	GDP (in Bil. US$nominal)	GDP per capita (in US$ nominal)	GDP growth (real)	Inflation rate (in Percent)	Unemployment (in Percent)	Government debt (in % of GDP)
1980	14.8	5,050.0	12.2	4,139.9	▲6.0%	▲63.5%	n/a	n/a
1981	▲16.6	▲5,594.3	▲13.6	▲4,589.0	▲1.9%	▲34.0%	n/a	n/a
1982	▼15.9	▼5,347.4	▼11.1	▼3,727.4	▼-9.4%	▲19.0%	n/a	n/a
1983	▼15.6	▼5,198.1	▼6.1	▼2,033.0	▼-5.9%	▲49.2%	14.5%	n/a
1984	▲15.9	▲5,273.5	▼5.8	▼1,920.9	▼-1.5%	▲55.3%	▼14.0%	n/a
1985	▲16.5	▲5,422.0	▼5.7	▼1,865.1	▲0.3%	▲72.2%	▼13.1%	n/a
1986	▲18.0	▲5,912.7	▲7.0	▲2,302.5	▲7.5%	▲76.4%	▼10.1%	n/a
1987	▲19.6	▲6,381.1	▲8.8	▲2,864.7	▲5.9%	▲63.6%	▼9.1%	n/a
1988	▲20.4	▲6,599.9	▲9.1	▲2,946.4	▲0.5%	▲62.2%	▼8.6%	n/a
1989	▲21.4	▲6,896.1	▲9.6	▲3,088.0	▲1.1%	▲80.4%	▼8.0%	n/a
1990	▲22.3	▲7,136.0	▲11.2	▲3,573.1	▲0.3%	▲112.5%	▲8.5%	n/a
1991	▲23.8	▲7,594.2	▲13.4	▲4,281.1	▲3.5%	▲102.0%	▲8.9%	n/a
1992	▲26.3	▲8,333.4	▲15.5	▲4,890.2	▲7.9%	▲68.5%	▲9.0%	n/a
1993	▲27.7	▲8,705.4	▲18.0	▲5,659.5	▲2.7%	▲54.1%	▼8.3%	n/a
1994	▲30.3	▲9,449.3	▲21.0	▲6,530.0	▲7.3%	▲44.7%	▲9.2%	n/a
1995	▲30.5	▼9,448.7	▲23.2	▲7,176.4	▼-1.4%	▲42.2%	▲10.3%	n/a
1996	▲32.8	▲10,095.7	▲24.6	▲7,580.6	▲5.6%	▲28.3%	▲11.9%	n/a
1997	▲35.0	▲10,665.0	▲26.0	▲7,925.9	▲5.0%	▲19.8%	▼11.6%	n/a
1998	▲37.0	▲11,183.4	▲27.6	▲8,329.1	▲4.5%	▲10.8%	▼10.1%	n/a
1999	▼36.8	▼11,042.6	▼26.1	▼7,814.5	▼-1.9%	▲5.7%	▲11.2%	n/a
2000	▲36.9	▼11,030.1	▼24.8	▼7,406.0	▼-1.9%	▲4.8%	▲13.4%	n/a
2001	▼36.3	▼10,837.5	▼22.7	▼6,776.8	▼-3.8%	▲4.4%	▲15.2%	n/a
2002	▼34.0	▼10,170.0	▼14.8	▼4,425.1	▼-7.7%	▲14.0%	▲16.8%	n/a
2003	▲35.0	▲10,480.1	▼13.1	▼3,926.7	▲0.8%	▲19.4%	▲17.2%	n/a
2004	▲37.7	▲11,289.8	▲14.9	▲4,456.8	▲5.0%	▲9.2%	▼13.3%	n/a
2005	▲41.8	▲12,471.6	▲18.9	▲5,638.0	▲7.5%	▲4.7%	▼12.1%	n/a
2006	▲44.9	▲13,360.9	▲21.3	▲6,347.3	▲4.1%	▲6.4%	▼10.8%	n/a
2007	▲49.1	▲14,616.2	▲25.5	▲7,587.9	▲6.5%	▲8.1%	▼9.4%	n/a
2008	▲53.6	▲15,945.2	▲33.0	▲9,808.9	▲7.2%	▲7.9%	▼7.9%	46.4%
2009	▲56.3	▲16,653.9	▲34.4	▲10,181.7	▲4.2%	▲7.1%	▼7.8%	▼46.4%
2010	▲61.4	▲18,069.7	▲43.8	▲12,899.7	▲7.8%	▲6.7%	▼7.0%	▼40.8%
2011	▲65.9	▲19,306.8	▲52.3	▲15,331.1	▲5.2%	▲8.1%	▼6.3%	▲41.6%
2012	▲66.8	▲19,489.1	▲55.6	▲16,213.8	▲3.5%	▲8.1%	6.3%	▲49.8%
2013	▲70.4	▲20,475.3	▲62.1	▲18,049.7	▲4.6%	▲8.6%	▲6.5%	▲50.1%
2014	▲74.2	▲21,491.9	▼61.9	▼17,908.8	▲3.2%	▲8.9%	▲6.6%	▲50.8%
2015	▲74.9	▲21,614.5	▼57.4	▼16,565.8	▲0.4%	▲8.7%	▲7.5%	▲57.8%
2016	▲76.9	▲22,092.5	▼57.2	▼16,448.8	▲1.7%	▲9.6%	▲7.9%	▼55.8%
2017	▲79.1	▲22,637.3	▲64.4	▲18,431.4	▲1.6%	▲6.2%	7.9%	▲56.7%
2018	▲81.4	▲23,204.0	▼64.3	▼18,338.8	▲0.5%	▲7.6%	▲8.4%	▲58.3%
2019	▲83.1	▲23,617.2	▼61.0	▼17,341.4	▲0.4%	▲7.9%	▲8.9%	▲61.0%
2020	▼79.0	▼22,361.7	▼53.7	▼15,208.0	▼-6.1%	▲9.8%	▲10.4%	▲68.3%
2021	▲85.9	▲24,233.1	▲59.3	▲16,735.3	▲4.4%	▲7.7%	▼9.4%	▼65.1%
2022	▲96.8	▲27,232.8	▲71.2	▲20,017.6	▲5.3%	▲9.1%	▼7.9%	▼61.2%
2023	▲103.8	▲29,109.3	▲73.0	▲20,463.9	▲3.6%	▲7.8%	7.9%	▲62.6%
2024	▲108.9	▲30,425.7	▲74.8	▲20,919.5	▲2.7%	▲6.4%	7.9%	▲63.9%
2025	▲113.7	▲31,668.3	▲77.6	▲21,620.1	▲2.5%	▲5.8%	7.9%	▲64.1%
2026	▲118.4	▲32,882.5	▲79.6	▲22,122.0	▲2.2%	▲4.5%	7.9%	▲64.9%
2027	▲123.3	▲34,153.7	▲82.0	▲22,710.1	▲2.2%	▲4.5%	7.9%	▼64.7%

- Industrial production growth rate: 12.6% (2006 est.)
- Electricity - production: 9,474 GWh (1998)
  - fossil fuel: 3.91%
  - hydro: 95.62%
  - nuclear: 0%
  - other: 0.47% (1998)
- Electricity - consumption: 6,526 GWh (1998)
- Electricity - exports: 2,363 GWh (1998)
- Electricity - imports: 78 GWh (1998)
- Agriculture - products: wheat, rice, barley, maize, sorghum; livestock; fish
- Exchange rates: Uruguayan pesos per US dollar - 24.048 (2006), 24.479 (2005), 28.704 (2004), 28.209 (2003), 21.257 (2002)

== Uruguay in the world ==
The following table shows the economic rankings of Uruguay compared to the world:

Index	Source	Rank	Published
Quality of Life Index	Numbeo	42°	2024
Human Development Index	UNDP	52°	2022
Democracy Index	Economist Intelligence Unit	11°	2022
Global Peace Index	Vision of Humanity	46°	2020-2022
Prosperity Index	Legatum	37°	2021
Corruption Perceptions Index	Transparency	14°	2023
Economic Freedom Index	Heritage	34°	2022
Global Competitiveness Report	World Economic Forum	54°	2019
Cost of Living Index	Expatistan	30°	2023
Debt Rating	Moodys	BAA2	2021
Debt Rating	S&P	BBB	2017
Debt Rating	Fitch	BBB-	2020
Developed Country Recognition	World Bank	High Income	2023
Developed Country Recognition	United Nations	Very High HDI	2021 (2022 report)
Index of Geopolitical Gains and Losses after Energy Transition (GeGaLo Index)	Overland et al.	6 out of 156	2019

== See also ==
- List of companies of Uruguay
- List of state-owned enterprises of Uruguay
- List of trade unions in Uruguay
- Central Bank of Uruguay
- Corruption in Uruguay
- Entes Autónomos y Servicios Descentralizados
- Ministry of Economy and Finance (Uruguay)
- Ministry of Labor and Social Welfare (Uruguay)
- Office of Planning and Budget
- Taxation in Uruguay
- Uruguay and the International Monetary Fund
- Uruguay and the World Bank
- Economy of South America
- List of Latin American and Caribbean countries by GDP growth
- List of Latin American and Caribbean countries by GDP (nominal)
- List of Latin American and Caribbean countries by GDP (PPP)
