= List of companies of Uruguay =

Location of Uruguay

Uruguay's economy is a high-income, export-oriented, South American economy; Brazil and Argentina are its main business partners. It is a key exporter of milk, beef, rice, and wool.

== Notable firms ==
This list includes notable companies with primary headquarters in their country. The industry and sector follow the Industry Classification Benchmark taxonomy. Organizations that have ceased operations are included and noted as defunct.

Notable companies Status: P=Private, S=State; A=Active, D=Defunct
Name	Industry	Sector	Headquarters	Founded	Notes	Status	
ANCAP	Oil & gas	Exploration & production	Montevideo	1931	State petroleum	S	A
ANTEL	Telecommunications	Fixed line telecommunications	Montevideo	1974	Local telecom	S	A
Banco de la República Oriental del Uruguay	Financials	Bank	Montevideo	1896	State-owned bank	S	A
Bolsa de Valores de Montevideo	Financials	Financial services	Montevideo	1921	Stock exchange	P	A
El País	Media	Mass media	Montevideo	1918	Newspaper	P	A
State Railways Administration of Uruguay	Industrials	Railroads	Montevideo	1952	Railway	S	A
UTE	Utilities	Electricity	Montevideo	1912	Electric power generation and transmission	P	A

== See also ==
- List of state-owned enterprises of Uruguay
- Economy of Uruguay
