= List of state-owned enterprises of Uruguay =

Uruguay had the first welfare state of Latin America under the presidency of José Batlle y Ordoñez in 1904. Government-owned corporations monopolize services such as electricity (UTE), land-line communications (Antel) and water (OSE). Antel competes with private corporations in the cell-phone lines and international telephony markets. In 1992, under the presidency of Luis Alberto Lacalle, the government attempted to privatize all its companies, following the neoliberal Washington Consensus. However, a referendum won by 75% of the population kept the companies in the hands of the government. By the end of his term, president Lacalle alleged that he had achieved a successful modernization of the companies, which had made them more efficient.

State-owned companies in Uruguay are generically known as Entes Autónomos y Servicios Descentralizados:

- ANCAP
- ANTEL
- Banco de la República Oriental del Uruguay
- Banco de Previsión Social
- Banco Hipotecario del Uruguay
- Banco de Seguros del Estado
- Central Bank of Uruguay
- Obras Sanitarias del Estado
- PLUNA
- SODRE
- State Railways Administration of Uruguay
- University of the Republic
- UTE
