= Uruguay and the International Monetary Fund =

Uruguay is a founding member of the International Monetary Fund (IMF), having joined the organization at its inception. The South American nation has periodically engaged with the Fund through various credit arrangements, primarily utilizing standby agreements to reinforce its economic stability during times of regional financial turbulence.

== Background ==
The International Monetary Fund (IMF), established in 1944 at the Bretton Woods Conference, is an international organization that works to ensure the stability of the international monetary system. It provides policy advice, financial assistance, and capacity development to its member countries. Uruguay, a South American nation with a diversified economy, has been a member since the Fund's inception. The Uruguayan economy is relatively balanced, with significant contributions from agriculture (7.5% of GDP), a robust tourism sector (10%), and a substantial industrial base (20.6%). As of 2017, Uruguay held the ninth-largest economy in South America and ranked 96th globally by GDP.

== Financial arrangements ==
Uruguay has periodically utilized the IMF's financial resources, primarily through Stand-By Arrangements (SBAs), which provide a line of credit for countries to draw upon to address balance of payments problems. Unlike many other Latin American nations, Uruguay's engagements with the Fund have not typically involved extensive packages of structural austerity measures.

The first such arrangement was established in 1996. These credit lines were often secured during periods of solid economic growth—at times exceeding 5% annually—but also amid high levels of dollarization, where the U.S. dollar circulates alongside the national currency. For context, as of 2008, approximately 60% of bank loans in Uruguay were denominated in U.S. dollars rather than the Uruguayan peso.

These SBAs have typically been approved for one-to-two-year terms, with credit amounts ranging from 150 to 2,000 million SDR (approximately US$108 million to US$1.5 billion). Between 2000 and 2006, the Uruguayan government drew upon 72% of the funds made available to it, with the last arrangement of this period expiring in December 2006. As of May 2017, Uruguay's outstanding debt to the IMF was a minimal 380,000 SDR (roughly US$274,500), a negligible amount representing less than 0.00001% of its US$53.44 billion GDP.

== Economic impact and performance ==
The use of IMF credit facilities has coincided with Uruguay's implementation of a gradualist "anti-inflation strategy" initiated in the 1990s. This policy has been largely successful; while inflation peaked at 140% in the past, it had been reduced to around 9% by 2017, though this still exceeded the government's target of 6%.

The IMF has noted that Uruguay maintains a high degree of financial liquidity, enhancing its resilience to external shocks. The country's economic growth has, at times, been tempered by downturns in its major trading partners, Argentina and Brazil, as well as by a broader global economic slowdown affecting demand from partners like China. Despite these regional headwinds, Uruguay's prudent fiscal management and strategic use of IMF support are widely seen as key factors in its enduring economic and political stability within a often volatile South American context. This stability has allowed Uruguay to keep pace with, and occasionally outperform, the GDP growth rates of its larger neighbours.

== See also ==
- Economy of Uruguay
- Dollarization
- Latin American debt crisis
