= Uruguay and the World Bank =

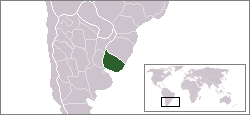
Uruguay's Location

Uruguay and the World Bank have been working together for a long time. This is because they both mutually benefit.

From the WBG, Uruguay asks for the development of finance services and innovative knowledge, the use of integrated services with the participation of the World Bank, the International Finance Corporation (IFC) and the Multilateral Investment Guarantee Agency (MIGA) and the publication of Uruguayan development experiences in web sites where the WBG can serve as a platform for the dissemination of successful reforms.

On the other hand, working with Uruguay is interesting for the world bank, because it is a country that is interested in increasing the productivity and insertion in the international sphere plus they are both interested in finding innovative development solution to assist the country and create positive externalities.

== Current state of Uruguay ==
Uruguay has had an annual growth rate of 4.54% between 2003 and 2016, it was reported a high income country by the WB in 2013, and by 2016 extreme poverty almost disappeared, it went from 2.5% of the population to .2%. As of 2017, Uruguay's GDP per capita is US$16,245.6.

== WBG projects in Uruguay ==
The WBG is formed by the IBRD, the IFC and MIGA. As of October 2017, the World bank has invested in 12 projects worth US$1.347 billion, these projects are in areas such as infrastructure, transport agriculture natural resources, education, sanitation and health.

=== IBRD projects ===
The IBRD has several different projects happening some of them are for road construction. There are also loans for policy development, which result in the improvement of the country's credit rating, which obtained the Investment grade in 2012.

=== IFC projects ===
Since October 2017, the IFC is focusing on infrastructure, the financial sector and the angro-industry, their projects are valued at US$101 million.

=== MIGA projects ===
In 2016, the Uruguayan Subsidiary of Banco Santander received a guarantee of US$439 million from the MIGA.

== Specific projects ==
=== FMD Emergency Recovery Project ===
In May 2001, Uruguay suffered from a major crisis, that was caused the Foot and Mouth disease (FMD) which affected about 8.3% of the cattle. The livestock sector makes up 6% of the total GDP therefore this affected the economy drastically. The IBRD contributed with the FMD Emergency Recovery Project with US$18.5 Million. The project consisted of treating the livestock with vaccines and training workers and having awareness campaigns, this resulted in the improvement of the sanitary status and the FDM was eradicated from the country. Furthermore, the country's economy was reactivated and it is globally recognized for effective food safety and surveillance. Since 1996 livestock production has grown 124% which proves the success of the project.

=== Uruguay Water ===
Although Uruguay's economy is one of the largest in Latin America, it is also pretty small (3 million people), meaning all public utilities are monopolies because once someone is in charge no one wants to be the competition, which would push for reform. Although the country has tried to make progress concerning infrastructure the pipe sewerage is still relatively low compared to Chile, Colombia, and Mexico. This problem has been addressed by the IBRD for the past 2 decades with 3 infrastructure investment loans and it extended one of the Uruguay a Technical Assistance Loan. Thanks to this Uruguay's OSE (the country's public & sanitation utility) has slowly evolved, water treatment supplies have increased from 440,000$m^3$per day in 1988 to 630,000$m^3$per day in 2006. Moreover, the IBRD has financed 12300 sewerage connections in 12 cities that cover 60,000 people. And thanks to the IBRD OSE now is part of a system that includes an autonomous water and electricity regulator and a separate policy-making agency.

=== Energy efficiency ===
Two decades ago Uruguayans did not care for energy efficiency but in 2004 the Project Energy Efficiency Uruguay promoted using energy in a more efficient way. The WB loaned US$6,8 million for this project. This project changed the way Uruguayans use energy, since part of the project was to educate about energy efficiency.

== Results ==
Uruguay suffered from a crisis in 2001 and 2002 with the contribution of the World Bank Uruguay got out of this crisis. The bank did this by providing Uruguay with lending and non lending services that included measures in areas of tax reform, financial sector and capital market development. The bank made these lendings easier by providing part of this aid in Uruguayan pesos in 2007. Thanks to the collaboration of the bank Uruguay overcame its crisis and achieved macroeconomic stability. Poverty was reduced by nearly 39% between 2003–09 and of the 3% of the population that lived in extreme poverty went down to 1.3%.
