= List of companies listed on the Montevideo Stock Exchange =

The following is a list of companies listed on the Montevideo Stock Exchange.

== Upcoming companies listings ==
On 9 and 10 December 2026 the retail pharmacy chain Farmashop is going to be listed on the Electronic Stock Exchange (BEVSA) and the Montevideo Stock Exchange.

== Currently listed companies ==
Symbol	ISIN	Company name	Industry	Listed on
ALUMINIO URUG.	ISIN: UYAAAL089UY2	Aluminios del Uruguay S.A.	Aluminum	2 June 1950
ACVALENTINES	ISIN: UYAAAF076UY7	Areaflin S.A.- Parque Eólico Valentines	Wind farms	30 November 2016
ACMODELO; ACMODELOESC	ISIN: UYAA02001UY2; ISIN: UY6454A1A3T8	Frigorífico Modelo S.A.	Meat	5 October 1939
ACGRALADO; ACGRALADOESC	ISIN: UYAA01001UY3; ISIN: UYAAGR118UY7	Gralado S.A. de Beneficio e Interés Colectivo	Retail and transport	
ACISUSA	ISIN: UYAA01002UY1	Industria Sulfúrica S.A.	Chemical	
PAP. MERCEDES	ISIN: UYAAPA090UY6	Pamer S.A.	Paper	23 September 1943
ACZORZAL	ISIN: UYAAZO190UY6	Zorzal Inversiones Tecnológicas S.A.	Technology	28 June 2024

== Formerly listed companies ==
Symbol	ISIN	Company name	Industry	Listed on	Delisted	Reason
B.COMERC.PREFS.	Unknown	Banco Comercial S.A.	Banking	26 October 1994		
C.Y M. PAYSANDU	Unknown	Cervecería y Maltería Paysandú S.A.	Beverage	29 August 1955	14 September 2005	The company went private.
C.NAL.CEMENTOS	Unknown	Compañía Nacional de Cementos S.A.		11 April 1946	2 July 2007	The company went private.
CIA. SALUS	Unknown	Companía Salus S.A.	Beverage	28 September 1910	16 July 2008	The company went private.
CRISTALERIAS	Unknown	Cristalerías del Uruguay S.A.	Glass and plastic	23 May 1929	8 June 2007	The company went private. In 1999 it closed its glass factory and left the glass industry.
ETERNIT URUGUAY	Unknown	Eternit Uruguaya S.A.		13 July 1967		
ACFANAPEL	ISIN: UYAAFA088UY2	Fábrica Nacional de Papel	Paper	1 January 1994	29 June 2018	The company went private after the closure of their factory on 13 February 2017.
FAB.NAL.CERVEZA	Unknown	Fábricas Nacionales de Cerveza	Beverage	20 August 1955		
FUNSA	Unknown	Fábrica Uruguaya de Neumáticos S.A.		17 April 1941		
MALT.ORIENTAL	Unknown	Maltería Oriental S.A.	Beverage	22 March 1993		
MONT. REFRESCOS	Unknown	Montevideo Refrescos S.A.	Beverage	18 December 1952	12 December 2005	The company went private.
ACUAG	ISIN: UYAA00002UY2	Union Agriculture Group S.A.	Agriculture	22 March 2013	1 June 2019	The company went private.
