= Legarra =

Legarra is a surname in the Basque language. Notable people with the surname include:

- Diego Labat (born 1969), full name Diego Labat Legarra, Uruguayan economist
- Miguel González de Legarra (born 1962), Spanish politician
- María Urquides (1908–1994), full name María Luisa Legarra Urquides, American educator
