= Ramón Díaz (economist) =

Uruguayan economist (1926–2017)

Ramón Tomás Díaz Gaspar, CBE (Montevideo, 30 May 1926 – 7 January 2017) was an influential Uruguayan journalist, lawyer and economist.

He presided over the Central Bank of Uruguay (1990–1993).

An advocate of the liberal thought in Uruguay, he was a member of the Mont Pelerin Society, which he presided in 1998.
