= Revenue stamps of Uruguay =

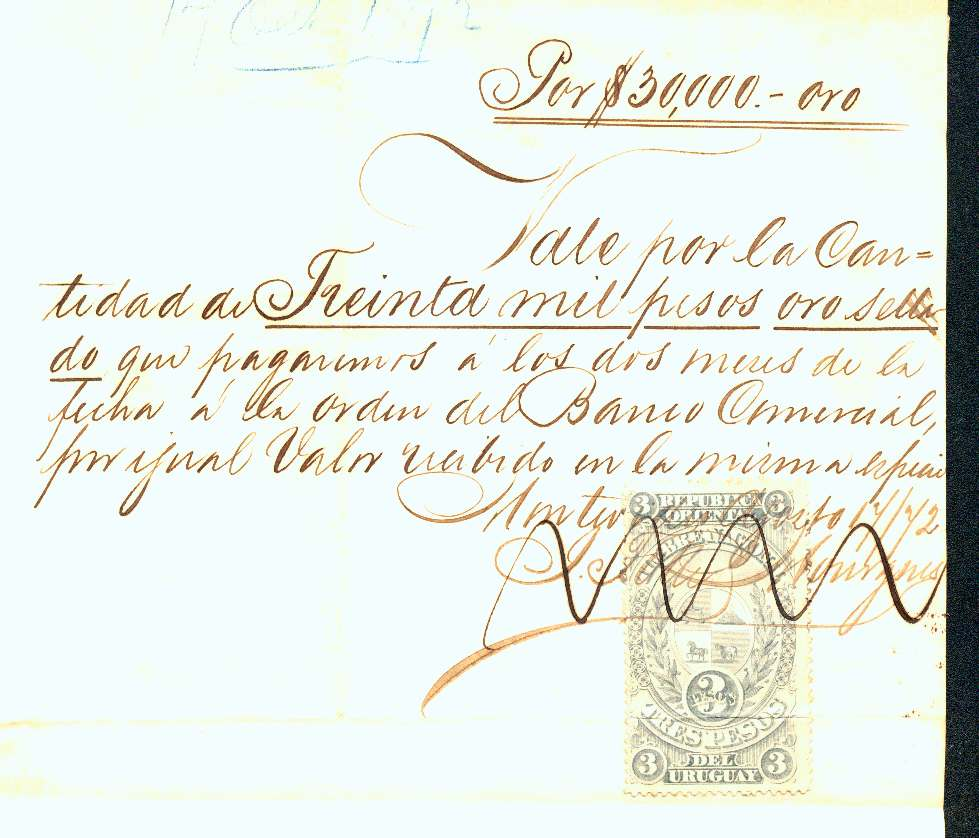
The first revenue stamp of Uruguay (1871) used on an 1872 document (image cropped).

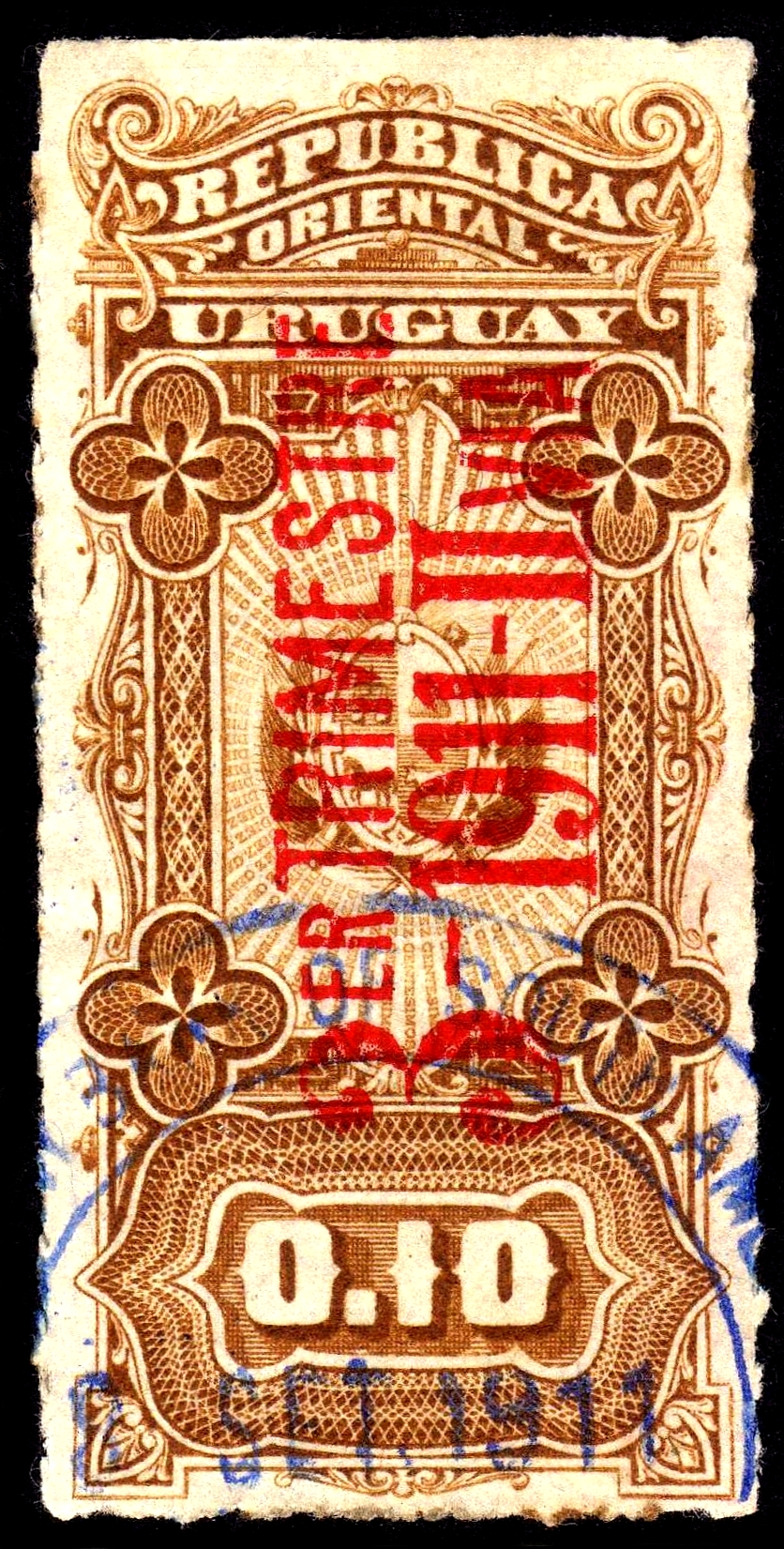
A 1911 revenue stamp of Uruguay.

Uruguay has issued revenue stamps since 1871. Uses have included documentary taxes, consular services, and tobacco and alcohol duties.

== First revenues ==
The first revenue stamps issued by Uruguay were the 1871 documentary series showing the national arms. Five values were issued from 20c to 3p.

== See also ==
- Postage stamps and postal history of Uruguay
- Taxation in Uruguay
