= Union Agriculture Group =

Union Agriculture Group S.A. (UAG)
- Company type: Private
- Industry: Agribusiness
- Founded: 2008
- Headquarters: Montevideo, Uruguay
- Area served: Uruguay
- Key people: Ricardo Lopes (President of the Board of Directors); Ignacio Rubio (CEO); Juan Pablo Roldán (Director); Braulio Píriz (Director);
- Revenue: $ 394,23 millions (2022) $ 511,91 millions (2023)
- Total assets: $ 3,8 billion (2023)
- Owner: ZMF Inc. (BVI) currently controls (Agriculture Investment Group Corp) 86.77% | China Investment Corporation (Chengdong Investment Corp.) 10,00%.
- Members: 1200+
- Subsidiaries: Granosur Holdings Limited
- Website: unionagrogroup.com

Union Agriculture Group S.A. (UAG), is one of the largest Uruguayan agricultural producers and was founded in 2008 for production of rice, soybeans and wheat, as well as in the breeding of sheep and cattle. It was the first company in its sector (agribusiness) with shares traded on the Montevideo Stock Exchange (BVM). The company operates more than 100 farms, totaling about 516,000 hectares.

The company's headquarters is in Montevideo, Uruguay.

== History ==
It was founded in 2008 by Uruguayan businessman Juan Sartori with foreign capital, to be a blueberry cultivation company, but it quickly diversified its agricultural operations in the production of rice, soybeans and wheat, as well as in raising sheep and cattle. Through its subsidiaries, UAG owns the company Granosur, thereby generating an agricultural value chain, from production, marketing, and logistics to processing and export facilities.

== Stock Exchange ==
In May 2013, UAG listed on the Montevideo Stock Exchange (BVM), the first IPO in Uruguay since 2007. The company became the largest company listed on the stock exchange and accounted for approximately 70 percent of the capitalization stock market.

In April 2019, its shareholders decided to take the company from open market to private.

== Acquisitions ==
In February 2014, UAG acquired 100 percent of Uruguayan assets in El Tejar for $170 million, as part of its plan to build its main properties in the country and consolidate its position as one of the largest agribusinesses in Latin America.

Granosur is a wholly owned subsidiary of UAG since 2015, focused on physical grain trading, storage and logistics. It has more than 81,000 tonnes of grain storage capacity across five different locations in Uruguay.

== Withdrawal from Union Group ==
UAG was part of the Union Group, where Juan Sartori also developed business in the areas of electricity and real estate. In 2018, with his departure from the direction of the UAG company, business was also disrupted, leaving only the agricultural business for UAG.

Sartori's departure from the company cost UAG an amount of $3 million. Currently, UAG's operations have no connection with Juan Sartori's Union Acquisition Corp

Currently the company is controlled (86.77% of shares) by a Spanish-Brazilian businessman, who holds the position of Chairman of the company's Board of Directors. Information was requested about the sale process, but details were denied by the company's investor relations department.

== Worldwide Operations ==
Until 2018 UAG belonged to Chinese investors, who also made investments in Oceania, in countries such as Australia and New Zealand. The company currently owns three properties in Australia totaling more than 50,000 hectares of arable land, with Angus, Waygu and sheep operations. In 2019, UAG sold its 2,800-hectare Mount Falcon property for $8.9 million.
