= Mario Bergara (politician) =

Uruguayan economist

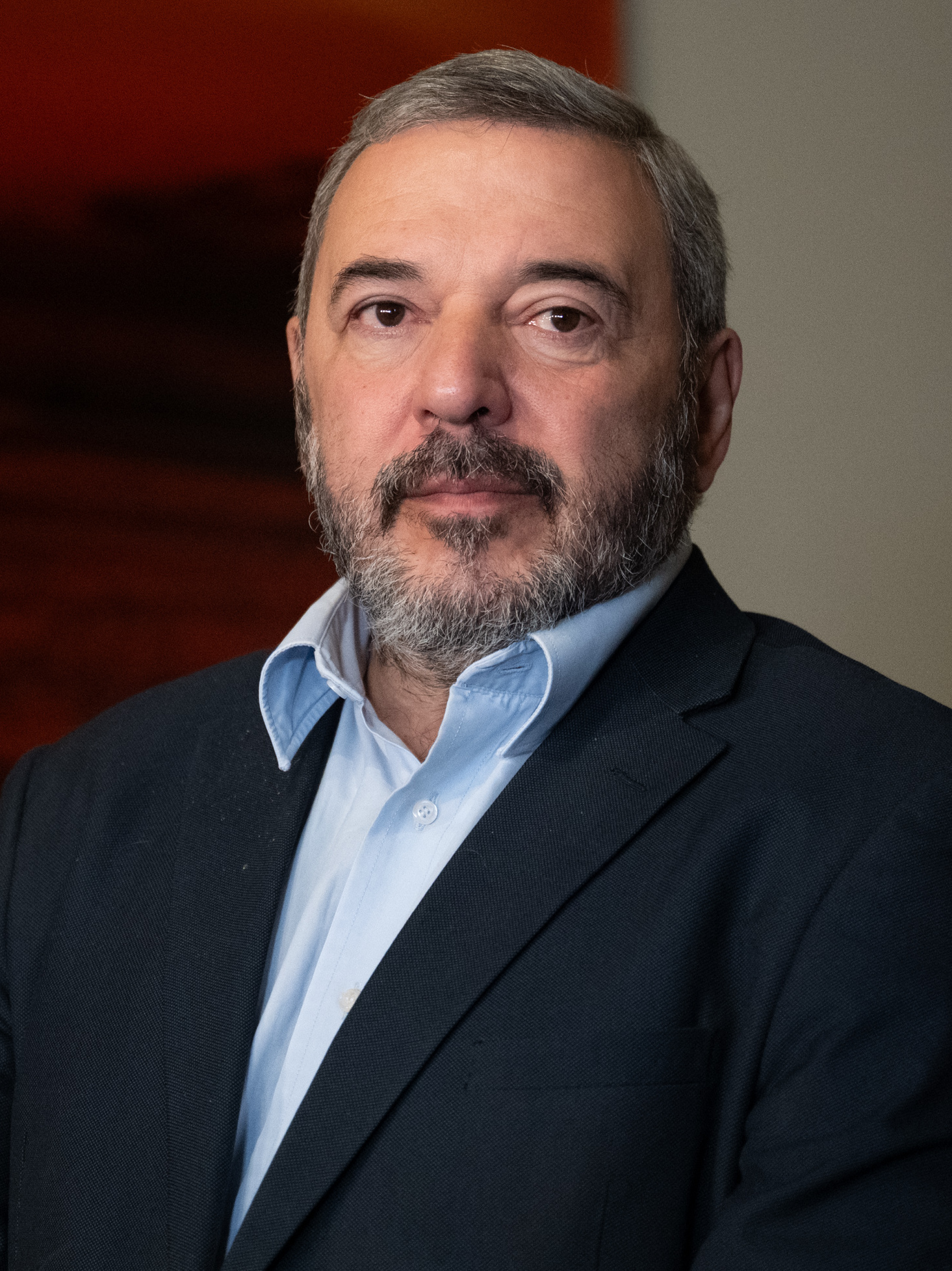
- Mario Bergara in 2025

Intendant of Montevideo
- Incumbent
- Assumed office 10 July 2025
- Preceded by: Carolina Cosse; Marcelo Zunino (acting)

Senator of Uruguay
- In office 15 February 2020 – 8 July 2025

President of the Central Bank of Uruguay
- In office 21 April 2015 – 11 October 2018
- Preceded by: Alberto Graña
- Succeeded by: Alberto Graña
- In office 11 November 2008 – 26 December 2013
- Preceded by: Walter Cancela
- Succeeded by: Alberto Graña

Minister of Economy and Finance of Uruguay
- In office 26 December 2013 – 1 March 2015
- Preceded by: Fernando Lorenzo
- Succeeded by: Danilo Astori

Deputy Minister of Economy and Finance of Uruguay
- In office 1 March 2005 – 18 September 2008
- Preceded by: Álvaro Rossa
- Succeeded by: Pedro Buonomo

Personal details
- Born: Mario Esteban Bergara Duque; 4 May 1965 (age 61) Montevideo, Uruguay
- Party: Broad Front
- Education: University of the Republic; University of California, Berkeley
- Occupation: Politician
- Profession: Accountant; Economist

Mario Esteban Bergara Duque (Spanish pronunciation: [ˈmaɾjo esˈteβan berɣaɾa ˈduke]; born 4 May 1965) is a Uruguayan economist, accountant and politician serving as Intendant of Montevideo since 2025. A member of the Broad Front, he previously served as Senator of the Republic in the 49th Legislature, as president of the Central Bank of Uruguay between 2008–2013 and again from 2015 to 2018, and as minister of Economy and Finance from 2013 to 2015.

== Early life ==
Bergara, along with his twin brother, was born on 4 May 1965 in Montevideo to a family of Spanish descent. His parents were members of the Colorado Party. He attended primary school at Escuela N° 137 María Noya and secondary school at Liceo Nº 26 Líber Falco. Bergara attended the University of the Republic for his undergraduate studies, graduating as an economist and public accountant in 1987 and 1990. In 1998, he obtained his doctorate in economics from the University of California, Berkeley after completing his master's degree in economics a year earlier, also at Berkeley. In 2008, Bergara was awarded the Elise and Walter A. Haas International Award from Berkeley.

Bergara started to revolt against the civic-military dictatorship of Uruguay as early as sixteen years old, starting off by collecting signatures and distributing flyers. In 1983, Bergara joined the Communist Youth Union.

== Political career ==
Bergara has worked at the Banco de la República and at the Banco Central. He was head of the Department of Economic Studies of the Central Bank from 2001 to 2005. He was also the director of the Communications Services Regulatory Unit.

Although originally a member of the Communist Party, Bergara eventually aligned himself with the Broad Front after his departure from the Communist Party in 1989 and upon returning from his graduate studies in the U.S. Upon his return, he frequently collaborated with Líber Seregni, one of the founding members of the Broad Front, especially during Seregni's later years. After the electoral victory of Tabaré Vázquez in the 2004 general election, he was appointed Deputy Minister of Economy and Finance, accompanying Minister Danilo Astori.

He resigned from his position in the ministry at the same time that Astori did. On 11 November 2008, he assumed the role of President of the Central Bank of Uruguay, a position he held until 26 December 2013. At that moment, he was appointed Minister of Economy and Finance, replacing Fernando Lorenzo. He returned to the post of president of the Central Bank in April 2015.

In 2019, Bergara was a candidate in the Broad Front primary election. However, he was defeated by Daniel Martínez, who represented the party in the general election the same year. After the primary result of the elections, Bergara obtained a total vote count of 23,688, corresponding to 9.28% of the total votes received by the Broad Front.

In the 2019 general election, he was elected Senator of the Republic for the 49th Legislature, taking office on 15 February 2020. In August 2023, he launched his candidacy for the Broad Front's 2024 presidential primary. However, he withdrew it in April 2024 and announced his endorsement of Yamandú Orsi. In the general election he was reelected as a senator for the 50th Legislature.

Starting in December 2024, speculation began to grow about a possible candidacy for Intendant of Montevideo in the 2025 municipal elections. In March, he officially launched his campaign. Bergara won the municipal election as the most voted candidate of the Broad Front, which emerged as the most supported party under the Ley de Lemas system. He resigned his Senate seat on July 8, 2025, and took office as Intendant on the 10th.

== Personal life ==
Bergara was married to journalist and anchorperson Blanca Rodríguez. He had a son, Diego, who died in 2013 from an undisclosed illness.

== Bibliography ==
- Bergara, Mario; Pereyra, Andrés; Tansini, Ruben; Garce, Adolfo; Chasquetti, Daniel; Buquet, Daniel; Moraes, Juan Andrés (2006). "Political Institutions, Policymaking Processes, and Policy Outcomes: The Case of Uruguay". SSRN Electronic Journal. doi:10.2139/ssrn.1814759. ISSN 1556-5068. S2CID 15825644.
