= Zhang Guangdou =

Chinese hydraulic engineer

- Born: 1 May 1912; Changshu, Jiangsu, China
- Died: 21 June 2013 (aged 101); Beijing
- Citizenship: Chinese
- Education: Shanghai Jiao Tong University; University of California, Berkeley; Harvard University
- Scientific career
- Fields: Civil Engineering
- Workplaces: Tsinghua University

Chinese name
- Traditional Chinese: 張光斗
- Simplified Chinese: 张光斗
Transcriptions
Standard Mandarin
- Hanyu Pinyin: Zhāng Guāngdǒu
- Wade–Giles: Chang Kuang-tou

Zhang Guangdou (Chinese: 张光斗; Wade–Giles: Chang Kuang-tou; 1 May 1912 – 21 June 2013) was a Chinese hydraulic engineer. He was a specialist in hydraulic engineering, professor and vice president of Tsinghua University, and a member of the Chinese Academy of Sciences and Chinese Academy of Engineering.

== Biography ==
Zhang graduated from National Chiao Tung University (predecessor of now Shanghai Jiao Tong University) in 1934, obtained his master's degree in Civil Engineering from University of California, Berkeley in 1936, and a master's degree in engineering mechanics from Harvard University in 1937.

Zhang was the chief designer of the Miyun Reservoir and Yuzixi powerplant. He was also involved in the design of many major hydraulic and hydropower projects, including Sanmenxia, Danjiangkou, Gezhouba, Ertan, Geheyan, Xiaolangdi, and the Three Gorges Dam.

Zhang received numerous awards, including the Haas International Award from UC Berkeley (1981), the National Award for Technology Advancement (2nd Prize, 1985), the Ho Leung Ho Lee Technology Advancement Award (1995), and the Technology Achievement Award from the Chinese Academy of Engineering (1996). He was elected to the Chinese Academy of Sciences in 1955, and the Chinese Academy of Engineering in 1994. He was also elected as a foreign member of Mexico National Academy of Engineering in 1981.

== Bibliography ==
- Zhang, Guangdou, ed. (2000). CFRD 2000 : proceedings : International Symposium on Concrete Faced Rockfill Dams : 18 September, 2000, Beijing, China. et al. Beijing: Organizing Committee of 20th Congress ICOLD. OCLC 660241666.
- Clough, Ray W; Zhang, Guangdou, eds. (June 1987). Earthquake behavior of arch dams : proceedings of the China-US workshop, Beijing, China, June 1987 (1st ed.). Beijing: International Academic Publishers. ISBN 978-0-08-037042-2. OCLC 555740856.
- Zhang, Guangdou; et al. (April 1986). "Dynamic field measurement and analysis of Quanshui Arch Dam" (PDF). Scientia Sinica. Series B, Chemical, Biological, Agricultural, Medical & Earth Sciences. 29 (4). Beijing, China: Science Press: 423–438. ISSN 0253-5823. OCLC 25834959.
- Zhang, Guangdou (April 1973). Construction of dams for water conservancy in the People's Republic of China. et al. Beijing. OCLC 57717690.
