= Daniel Chasquetti =

Uruguayan political scientist

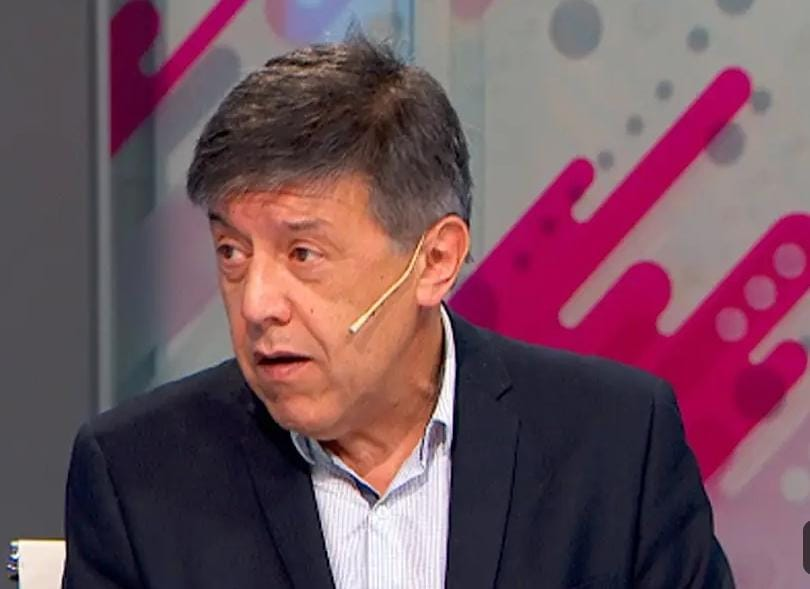
Daniel Chasquetti in 2024.

Daniel Chasquetti Pérez (born 27 May 1964 in Montevideo) is a Uruguayan political scientist and author.

In 1997, he obtained his degree in political science from the University of the Republic. Subsequently, in 2001, he obtained his master's degree in political science with a thesis on Multi-party Systems and Coalitions in Latin America. In 2010, he obtained his doctorate in social sciences with a thesis on Legislative Careers in Uruguay.

He is a full professor in the Department of Political Science at the University of the Republic. He has published several articles on political and electoral analysis, some of them jointly with economist Mario Bergara.

== Selected works ==
- Parlamento y Carreras Legislativas en Uruguay: un estudio sobre reglas, partidos y legisladores en las Cámaras. Montevideo: UdelaR. 2014. p. 330.
- Democracia, presidencialismo y partidos políticos en América Latina: evaluando la “difícil combinación”. Montevideo: Cauce. 2008. p. 180.
- Fragmentación política y gobierno en Uruguay: ¿un enfermo imaginario?. Montevideo: Instituto de Ciencia Política, FCS-UdelaR. 1999. p. 130. (with Daniel Buquet and Juan Andrés Moraes)
