= Taxation in Uruguay =

Taxes collected in Uruguay

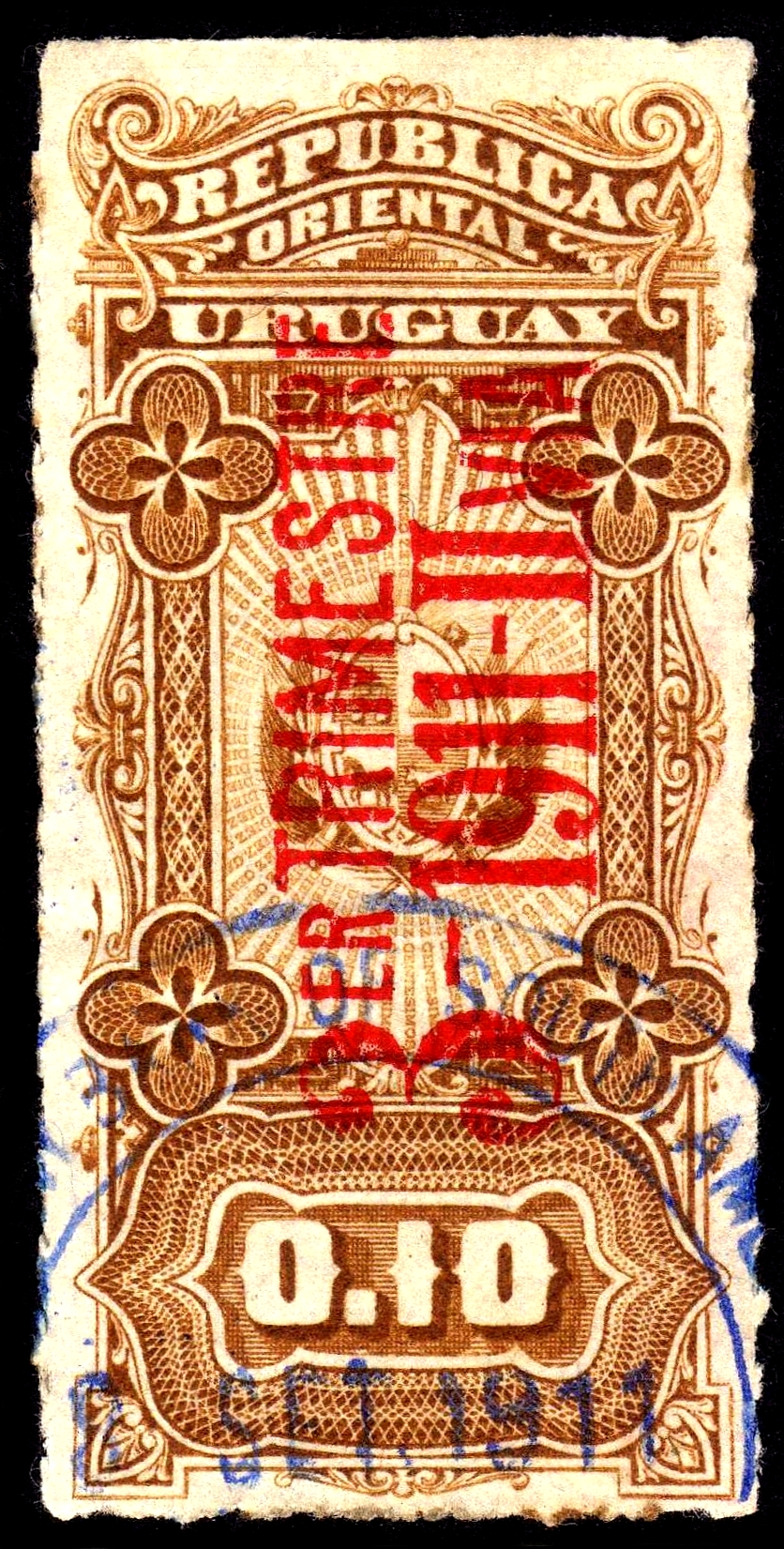
1911 revenue stamp of Uruguay.

Taxes in Uruguay are taxes collected mainly by the General Taxation Directorate (Spanish: Dirección General Impositiva, DGI) in Uruguay.

A major tax reform bill came into force on 1 July 2007 with the number 18083. Nevertheless, something important remained: Uruguay applies the source principle, with investments located and activities performed outside Uruguay remaining untouched.

== Tax rates ==
- Value added taxes (VAT): basically 22%, but some goods (pharmaceutical, etc.) are taxed with 10%, and fruits and vegetables are not taxed. As of August 2014, the Financial Inclusion Law (Spanish: Ley de Inclusión Financiera) established a 4% tax deduction for sales with debit cards and 2% for credit cards.
- Corporate tax: it used to be 30%, since 2007 it was lowered to 25%, but special dispositions can bring this to 33%.
- Individual income tax: Since 2007 there is a progressive scale of taxation, with a non-taxable minimum. The payroll tax is part of the same tax scheme.
- Wealth tax: There is a non-taxable minimum which leaves the big majority of Uruguayans out of this duty. A progressive scale of taxation ranges from 0.7% to 2.75%.

== Other taxes ==
- The Schools Tax (Spanish: Impuesto de Enseñanza Primaria) taxing urban rural estate was collected by the National Administration of Public Education and, since 2018, is collected direct by DGI.
- Regional administrations in the country can establish, collect and control certain taxes through their respective Departmental Councils. The most significant local taxes include the Real Estate Tax, Vehicle Registration Fee and the Food Analysis Tax.

== See also ==
- Economy of Uruguay
- Revenue stamps of Uruguay
