= Entes Autónomos y Servicios Descentralizados =

Legal form in Uruguay

The Autonomous State Entities and Decentralized Services (Spanish: Entes Autónomos y Servicios Descentralizados) are two types of government-owned corporations typical of the Uruguayan state.

According to Section XI of the Constitution of Uruguay, their legal personality is subject to public law.

== Autonomous State Entities ==
- Administración Nacional de Usinas y Trasmisiones Eléctricas (UTE)
- Administración Nacional de Combustibles, Alcohol y Portland (ANCAP)
- State Railways Administration of Uruguay (AFE)
- Instituto Nacional de Colonización (INC)
- Banco de la República Oriental del Uruguay (BROU)
- Banco Hipotecario del Uruguay (BHU)
- Central Bank of Uruguay (BCU)
- Banco de Seguros del Estado (BSE)
- Banco de Previsión Social (BPS)
- University of the Republic (UdelaR)
- Administración Nacional de Educación Pública (ANEP)

== Decentralized Services ==
- Attorney General's Office of Uruguay (FGN)
- Administración Nacional de Puertos (ANP)
- Administración Nacional de Telecomunicaciones (ANTEL)
- Administración de los Servicios de Salud del Estado (ASSE)
- Instituto del Niño y el Adolescente del Uruguay (INAU)
- Administración Nacional de Correos (ANC)
- Obras Sanitarias del Estado (OSE)
- Agencia Nacional de Vivienda (ANV)
