= The Elise and Walter A. Haas International Award =

Also called “Haas Award” is an award from the University of California at Berkeley established in 1964 by Walter A. Haas Jr., Peter E. Haas and Richard Goldman. It recognizes students or alumni of the university who are from a different country to the United States who have made significant contributions to their country.

The award winners have been:

Year	Winner	Country	Accomplishments
1966	Abdul Majid	Afghanistan	
1967	Galo Plaza	Ecuador	president of Ecuador and secretary general of OAS
1968	Kiyoshi “George” Togasaki	Japan	
1969	Mario Báncora	Argentina	
1970	Sun Fo	China	premier of China
1971	John J. Akar	Sierra Leone	ambassador to US; composed national anthem
1972	Garegin Saroukhanian	Iran	
1973	Zulfikar Ali Bhutto	Pakistan	prime minister and president of Pakistan
1974	Li Choh-ming	China-Hong Kong	founding vice chancellor of the Chinese University of Hong Kong
1975	Håkon Wexelsen	Norway	rector of the Norwegian College of Agriculture
1976	Haraldur Kröyer	Iceland	
1977	Menahem Rebhun	Israel	
1978	Sadako Ogata	Japan	president of UNICEF and later UN High Commissioner for Refugees
1979	João Baptista Pinheiro	Brazil	
1980	Kenneth D. Taylor	Canada	as ambassador to Iran, assisted escape of Americans from Iran
1981	Kuang Tou Chang	China	vice president of Tsinghua University
1982	Choong Kung Cho	South Korea	
1983	Yoash Vaadia	Israel	
1984	Widjojo Nitisastro	Indonesia	economist
1985	Allan Gotlieb	Canada	ambassador to US
1986	Joon Lew	South Korea	
1987	Not given		
1988	Hans Hollein	Austria	architect
1989	Julius Gikonyo Kiano	Kenya	
1990	Not given		
1991	Not given		
1992	Mohammed Al-Shaikh	Saudi Arabia	
1993	Hans-Peter Dürr	Germany	physicist and peace activist
1994	Han Sung-Joo	South Korea	
1994	James C. Y. Soong	China	governor of Taiwan
1996	Venkataram Ramakrishna	India	
1997	Laura Castillo de Gurfinkel	Venezuela	
1998	Ahmed Ahmed Goueli	Egypt	
1999	Urvashi Malhotra Sahni	India	feminist education activist
2000	Živorad I. Kovačević	Yugoslavia	politician, ambassador to US
2001	Miguel Ángel Rodríguez Echeverría	Costa Rica	president of Costa Rica
2002	Dorodjatun Kuntjoro-Jakti	Indonesia	ambassador to US
2003	Norman Myers	United Kingdom	environmentalist
2004	David Harrison	South Africa	
2005	Juree Vichit-Vadakan	Thailand	
2006	Mu Sochua	Cambodia	politician and human rights activist
2007	Marcos Espinal	Dominican Republic	physician in Pan American Health Organization
2008	Mario Bergara	Uruguay	economist, presided over Central Bank of Uruguay
2009	Reynato S. Puno	Philippines	Chief Justice of the Supreme Court of the Philippines
2010	Josephine Namboze	Uganda	
2011	Yuan Tseh “Y.T.” Lee	Taiwan	Nobel Prize in Chemistry
2012	Xiulan Zhang	China	
2013	Andrés Roemer	Mexico	public intellectual
