= Republica AFAP =

Uruguayan state-owned pension fund company

Republica AFAP is a Uruguayan state-owned pension fund company, based in Montevideo. It has a 38% share in the market as of 2010 and has some 20 different branches throughout Uruguay.
