= Banco Hipotecario del Uruguay =

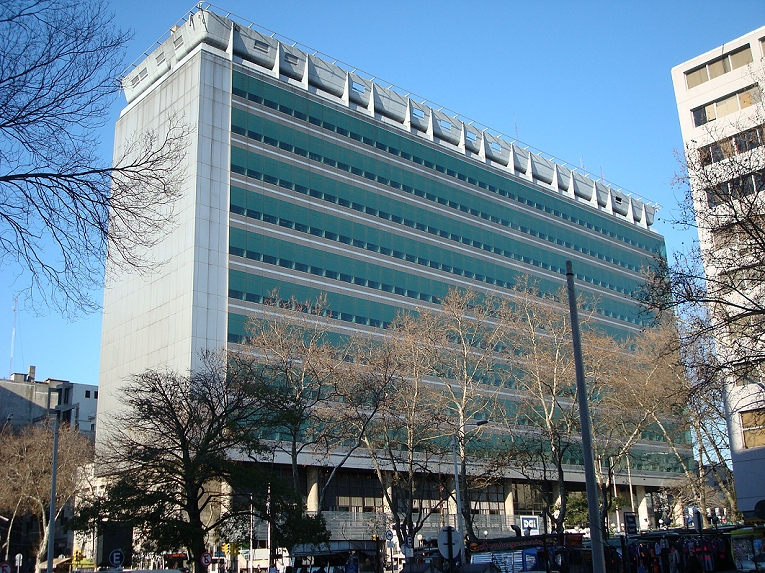
- Company type: State-owned
- Industry: Banking; Financial services
- Founded: March 24, 1892
- Headquarters: Uruguay
- Area served: Uruguay
- Website: www.bhu.net

The Mortgage Bank of Uruguay (Spanish: Banco Hipotecario del Uruguay) a state-owned bank in Uruguay.

== History ==
Established on March 24, 1892 by President Julio Herrera y Obes as an autonomous state entity (Spanish: Ente Autónomo).

It plays an important role in the local mortgage market. It is listed at the BVM.
