= Central Bank of Uruguay =

Monetary authority of Uruguay

Coordinates: 34.9032°S 56.2°W

Central Bank of Uruguay Banco Central del Uruguay

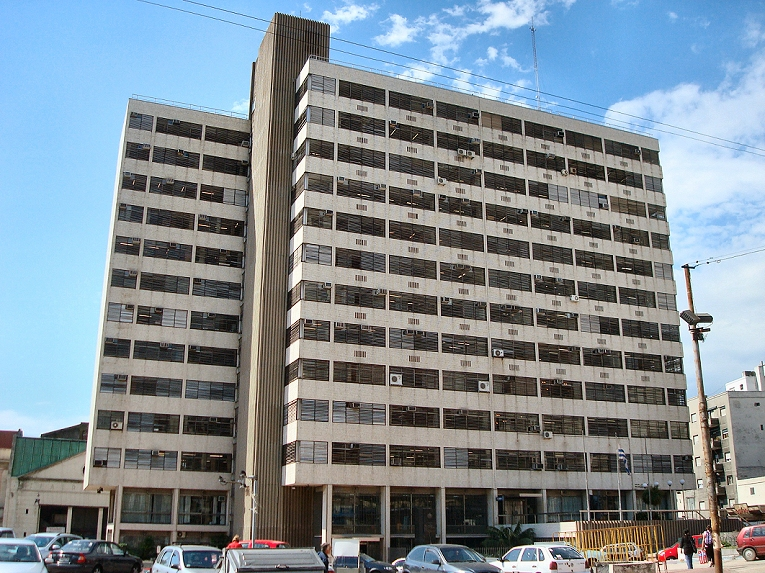
- Central bank of: Uruguay
- Headquarters: Montevideo
- Established: July 6, 1967
- Ownership: 100% state ownership
- President: Guillermo Tolosa
- Currency: Uruguayan peso UYU (ISO 4217)
- Reserves: 15,160 million USD
- Website: bcu.gub.uy

The Central Bank of Uruguay (Spanish: Banco Central del Uruguay, BCU) is the central bank of Uruguay.

== History ==
The Central Bank of Uruguay was established on July 6, 1967 as an autonomous state entity (Spanish: Ente Autónomo), with the passing of the 196th article of the Constitution of 1967. Prior to the creation of the BCU, the issuing of currency and managing and supervising of the banking system was handled by the department of the Banco de la República Oriental del Uruguay.

On March 30, 1995 a bank charter was passed (Law 16,696), which expanded the BCUs responsibilities and set out the management structure as well as the functions and responsibilities of the bank.

The headquarters of the Central Bank in Ciudad Vieja, Montevideo houses the numismatic museum, in which both Uruguayan coins and banknotes from the Banco de la República and the Central Bank, as well as foreign ones, are exhibited.

== Functions ==
According to the 7th article of the BCU's Charter, its responsibilities are;

- Issuer of money notes and coins, as well as their withdrawal throughout the republic
- Manage monetary, credit and currency exchanging as set out by law
- Act as economic advisor, banker and financial agent of the Government
- Administer the international reserves of the State
- Be the banker of all government institutions
- Represent the Uruguayan government at international financial organisations
- Regulate and supervise all financial institutions

== List of presidents ==
List of the presidents of Central Bank of Uruguay.

#	Name	Term of office		Tenure length	Notes
#	Name	Start of term	End of term	Tenure length	Notes
1	Enrique V. Iglesias	May 16, 1967	January 9, 1969	1 year, 238 days	
2	Carlos Sanguinetti	January 10, 1969	October 27, 1970	1 year, 290 days	
3	Armando Malet	October 27, 1970	November 21, 1970	25 days	
4	Nilo Márquez	December 14, 1970	August 12, 1971	241 days	
5	Jorge Echeverría	August 12, 1971	March 1, 1972	201 days	
6	Juan Pedro Amestoy	March 1, 1972	June 4, 1973	1 year, 95 days	
7	Carlos Ricchi	June 4, 1973	December 23, 1974	1 year, 202 days	
8	José Gil Díaz	December 23, 1974	July 5, 1982	7 years, 194 days	
9	José María Puppo	July 5, 1982	February 24, 1984	1 year, 234 days	
10	Juan Carlos Protasi	February 24, 1984	April 15, 1985	1 year, 50 days	
11	Ricardo Pascale	April 16, 1985	April 9, 1990	4 years, 358 days	
12	Ramón Díaz	April 9, 1990	October 18, 1993	3 years, 192 days	
13	Enrique Braga	October 18, 1993	April 7, 1995	1 year, 171 days	
14	Ricardo Pascale	April 7, 1995	April 18, 1996	1 year, 11 days	
15	Humberto Capote	April 18, 1996	April 12, 2000	3 years, 360 days	
16	César Rodríguez Batlle	April 13, 2000	July 24, 2002	2 years, 102 days	
17	Julio de Brun	July 25, 2002	March 10, 2005	2 years, 228 days	
18	Walter Cancela	March 10, 2005	October 24, 2008	3 years, 228 days	
19	Mario Bergara	November 11, 2008	December 26, 2013	5 years, 45 days	
20	Alberto Graña	January 10, 2014	April 20, 2015	1 year, 100 days	
21	Mario Bergara	April 20, 2015	October 11, 2018	3 years, 173 days	
22	Alberto Graña	October 11, 2018	March 4, 2020	1 year, 145 days	
23	Diego Labat	March 20, 2020	July 25, 2024	4 years, 127 days	
24	Washington Ribeiro	July 26, 2024	March 24, 2025	2 years, 23 days	
25	Guillermo Tolosa	March 24, 2025	Incumbent	1 year, 147 days	

== See also ==
- Bolsa de Valores de Montevideo
- Economy of Uruguay
- Uruguayan peso
- List of central banks
- Americas Central Securities Depositories Association
- List of financial supervisory authorities by country
