= 2002 Uruguay banking crisis =

The 2002 Uruguay banking crisis was a major banking crisis that hit Uruguay in July 2002. The crisis unfolded after years of heavy dollarization since the 1950s when chronic inflation and weak confidence in the peso led Uruguayans to prefer U.S. dollars. This left the economy highly exposed to external shocks. The crisis was caused by a considerable contraction in Uruguay's economy and by over-dependence on Argentina (tourism, and construction boom), which experienced a strong phase of an economic meltdown itself in late 2001. In total, approximately 1/3 of the country's deposits were withdrawn and five financial institutions were left insolvent. The value of the Uruguayan peso fell, losing nearly half of its value against the U.S. dollar in 2002.

Amid the crisis, the government's initial reliance on international banks to self-regulate delayed intervention, but political management eventually shifted.

== Events Leading to the Crisis ==
=== Dollarization ===
Dollarization has been a longstanding characteristic of the Uruguayan economy, rooted in chronic inflation and declining confidence in the domestic currency beginning in the 1950s. Dollar deposits were authorised in 1962 and became the preferred store of value during inflationary episodes. Researchers attribute Uruguay's high degree of dollarization to "incomplete markets", including the "absence of effective hedging instruments against alternatives to dollar inflation" and the "lack of peso dominated alternatives". Additionally, private risk assessments failed to account for the systemic impact of dollarization. By the mid-1970s, Uruguayan public debt was fully dollarized, and by 1982, its debt-to-GDP ratio nearly doubled. Dollarization created a vulnerability to external shocks which triggered a loss of confidence in the banking system due to its heavy exposure to foreign currency.

The high degree of dollarization of the exposed Uruguay to "sudden reversals of capital flows", leaving the economy vulnerable to external shocks, such as the Argentine crisis. Researchers have identified these dollarization patterns and the resulting "currency mismatches" as key structural weaknesses of the Uruguayan economy leading up to the 2002 crisis, where "financial dollarization reached its peak" and created a sustained reliance on foreign-currency assets. Due to dollarization, Uruguay's mostly dollar-dominated debt added up to more than 60 percent on the GDP in 2002.

=== Argentina ===
Uruguay's economy had become heavily reliant on its larger neighbour, Argentina. In December 2001, the Argentine government imposed "capital controls and deposit freezes to Argentina's nations" during its own financial crisis. Two of Uruguay's largest private banks, Banco Galicia Uruguay and Banco Commercial, faced "liquidity problems" due to their ownership by Argentine financial groups, making them "susceptible to Argentina's economic turmoil".

Following these capital controls, Argentines depositors began withdrawing their savings from Uruguay's overexposed financial system. As a result, Uruguay lost approximately 12 percent of its bank deposits by March 2002.

== Bank-Specific Vulnerabilities ==
=== Condition of the Banking Sector ===
Banco Central del Uruguay lost 70% of international reserves since January 2002.

==== Banco Comercial del Uruguay ====
In 1990, Chemical Overseas Holdings, Inc. (a subsidiary of JPMorgan Chase) together with Dresdner Bank Latinamerika and Credit Suisse First Boston acquired the Banco Comercial del Uruguay (BCU), one of that country's oldest and largest national banks. Over time, Uruguay developed into a large offshore banking center for Argentina and Brazil, largely as a result of its lax banking laws and the predominant view among Argentines that Uruguay was a stable place for their savings.

During the first two months of the crisis, some US$400 million in deposits went missing from the BCU alone, meaning 22 percent of its deposit base. The bank received limited liquidity support of US$50 million from the government. In the end, five financial institutions failed and hundreds of thousands of depositors in Uruguay, Argentina, and Brazil were left in dire economic straits after seeing their bank accounts literally disappear.

In January 2005, the Paris-based International Chamber of Commerce ruled that the Uruguayan government would have to pay US$120 million to JPMorgan Chase & Co., Dresdner Bank AG, and Credit Suisse First Boston for failing to maintain the solvency of the BCU.

The crisis underscores the three banks’ difficulty in managing risk in developing countries and dealing with local partners during a time of financial crisis. As a result, a class of BC's former depositors is suing the three international banks and the individual directors they appointed to BC's board to recover the losses suffered as a result of the banks collapse.

== Political crisis management ==
President Jorge Batlle appointed one of his most respected politicians, Alejandro Atchugarry, as Minister of Economics and Finance, a decision which proved vital in the reestablishment of fundamentals for economic recovery. Under Atchugarry, Uruguayan officials began negotiations with the International Monetary Fund to receive payouts from a total of US$3 billion. The role of the economist and academic Carlos Steneri was also considered fundamental to the way out of the crisis.

== Documentary ==
- Jorge Batlle: entre el cielo y el infierno. A 2024 documentary directed by Federico Lemos.

== See also ==
- South American economic crisis of 2002
- 1998–2002 Argentine great depression
- Latin American debt crisis
