= Corruption in Uruguay =

Corruption in Uruguay is low by regional standards. It has generally outperformed other Latin American countries frequently in corruption-related international indexes.

On Transparency International's 2025 Corruption Perceptions Index, Uruguay scored 73 on a scale from 0 ("highly corrupt") to 100 ("very clean"). When ranked by score, Uruguay ranked 17th among the 182 countries in the Index, where the country ranked first is perceived to have the most honest public sector. For comparison with regional scores, the best score among the countries of the Americas (Note: Argentina, Bahamas, Barbados, Belize, Bolivia, Brazil, Canada, Chile, Colombia, Costa Rica, Cuba, Dominica, Dominican Republic, Ecuador, El Salvador, Grenada, Guatemala, Guyana, Haiti, Honduras, Jamaica, Mexico, Nicaragua, Panama, Paraguay, Peru, Saint Lucia, Saint Vincent and the Grenadines, Suriname, Trinidad and Tobago, United States of America, Uruguay, Venezuela) was Canada's 75, with Uruguay the next-highest score; the average score was 42 and the worst score was 10. For comparison with worldwide scores, the best score was 89 (ranked 1), the average score was 42, and the worst score was 9 (ranked 181, in a two-way tie).

== Reasons for low corruption ==
Analysts have cited several factors that contribute to the low corruption level in Uruguay. First of all, it generally enjoys higher income levels than the Latin American average, although when GDP per capita or purchasing power parity is taken into account, it is on par with Chile and Argentina

In addition, Uruguay is a small, homogenous country where 40% of the population resides in the capital Montevideo. Combatting corruption is typically easier in large urban centers rather than in federal or continental democracies. Furthermore, Uruguay has successfully established a vibrant democratic system which has ensured strong institutional frameworks, though some issues with campaign financing make political parties vulnerable to corrupt influences.

Social inclusionary policies such as introducing pensions which reach 87% of the people as well as a lower level of unemployment also have played a significant role in cutting down corruption.

Uruguayan political parties have avoided clientelism, which has assuaged concerns of corruption. Besides, the expenditure in a public project is generally fixed, so the opportunity for discretionary politics is very limited.

== Instances of corruption ==
Despite the low corruption prevalent in the country, there have been accusations of corruption against government officials, including ex-president Jose Mujica who was being investigated in a corruption case involving a gas company.

Uruguay's historical record of financial secrecy has also exacerbated the risks of corruption. It is difficult for foreign countries to obtain records of their residents' undisclosed assets in Uruguay. This secrecy has created fertile ground for individuals to evade taxes in their respective countries of residence. For example, Spanish authorities investigated Argentine football superstar Lionel Messi for allegedly avoiding £4.2 million in taxes by taking the opportunity of Uruguayan regulations.

The main anti-corruption body in the country has also faced a lack of resources in its pursuit to tackle corruption.In recent years, the chronic underfunding of the anti-corruption body as well as several high profile scandals rocked Uruguay and damaged its reputation as a country with robust measures against corruption. First of all, the President's former head of security Alejandro Astesiano was arrested and sentenced to four years in prison for allegedly participating in a scheme to allow Russian citizens to obtain Uruguayan citizenship using false data. Well-known Uruguayan drug trafficker Sebastián Marset was also released from prison in UAE after getting a Uruguayan passport while in jail. The matter is still being investigated.

== Legal framework ==
Uruguay has been a party to the United Nations Convention against Corruption (UNCAC) since 2007 and the Inter-American Convention against Corruption since 1998. Its anti-corruption bodies and the judiciary are generally deemed to be independent.

The country has an anti-bribery law that prohibits government officials from taking or soliciting bribes. Anyone offering such a bribe will be imprisoned for six years. The law for control and prevention of money laundering stipulates prison sentences of up to ten years for such crimes.

Uruguay obliges political parties to declare their campaign financing and expenditures. Access to freedom of information is also generally upheld. However, there is no limit on how much a party can receive in contributions. Although important state officials submit asset declarations to the anti-corruption bodies, they are not made public. Whistleblower protection is also limited and revolving door practices remain unregulated.
