= Diego Labat =

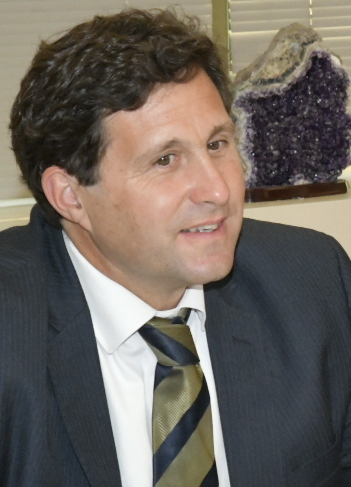

23rd President of the Central Bank of Uruguay
- In office March 20, 2020 – July 25, 2024
- President: Luis Lacalle Pou
- Preceded by: Alberto Graña
- Succeeded by: Washington Ribeiro

Personal details
- Born: Diego Labat Legarra; December 19, 1969 (age 56) Montevideo, Uruguay
- Children: 4
- Education: University of the Republic

Diego Labat Legarra (born 19 December 1969) is an Uruguayan economist and accountant who served as the 23rd president of the Central Bank of Uruguay from 2020 to 2024.

After earning a degree in economics in 1993 and in accounting in 1996 from the University of the Republic, he began working at several financial institutions. Before entering public activity, he worked as a professor at different universities. Linked to the National Party, he served as its representative on the board of the National Administration of Fuels, Alcohols and Portland between 2015 and 2020. Close to Luis Lacalle Pou, he was part of his economic team during the presidential campaign and once in government he was appointed president of the Central Bank of Uruguay. On January 3, 2023, Labat was distinguished as Banker of the Year for the Americas by the British publication The Banker.

== Early life and education ==
Labat was born on December 19, 1969. He attended Primary School No. 23 in Los Cerrillos, Canelones Department and Liceo No. 28 in Montevideo. Graduated from the University of the Republic as an economist in 1993 and as an accountant in 1996, he obtained a master's degree in international economics in 2005.

In 2011 he completed a Corporate Development Program (CDP) at the IESE Business School of the University of Navarra, and in 2014 a Senior Management Program (PAD) at the Institute of Business Studies of Montevideo.

== Career ==
In 1993 he began working at ABN AMRO Uruguay as an accountant and auditor. In 2001 he was promoted to the position of General Accountant but left in 2008. That year he was appointed General Accountant of the Uruguayan branch of the Spanish multinational financial services company Banco Santander, and in 2012 he assumed the position of chief financial officer, holding it until 2015.

Labat worked as a professor at the Faculty of Economic Sciences of the University of the Republic between 1996 and 2013, at the University of Montevideo twice, from 1998 to 2004 and from 2008 to 2011, and also at the Catholic University of Uruguay on as of 2006.

Labat entered politics in 2015 as a board member of the National Administration of Fuels, Alcohols and Portland (ANCAP) representing the National Party. He served in the position until 2020.

== President of the Central Bank ==
In 2019 he was part of the economic team of the presidential campaign of Luis Lacalle Pou. On March 4, 2020, President Luis Lacalle Pou appointed him interim president of the Central Bank of Uruguay pending the approval of the Senate, which was given on the 17th. On March 20, he assumed the position of president of the institution.

On July 25, 2024, he resigned from office to join the economic team of the presidential campaign of the National Party candidate, Álvaro Delgado Ceretta. He was succeeded by economist Washington Ribeiro.
