= Uruguayan peso =

Currency of Uruguay

Peso Uruguayo (Spanish)
- Uruguayan coins and bills.

ISO 4217
- Code: UYU (numeric: 858) before 1993: UYN, UYP
- Subunit: 0.01

Units of account
- Symbol: $ (Ur$)
- Subunit
- 1/100: centésimo

Denominations
- Banknotes: $20, $50, $100, $200, $500, $1000, $2000
- Coins
- Freq. used: $1, $2, $5, $10
- Rarely used: $50 (commemorative)

Demographics
- Date of introduction: March 1, 1993; 33 years ago
- Replaced: Uruguayan nuevo peso
- User(s): Uruguay

Issuance
- Central bank: Central Bank of Uruguay
- Website: www.bcu.gub.uy

Valuation
- Inflation: 4.96%
- Source: National Statistics Institute, July 2024.

Uruguayan peso (Spanish: peso uruguayo) has been a name of the Uruguayan currency since Uruguay's settlement by Europeans. The present currency, the peso uruguayo (ISO 4217 code: UYU) was adopted in 1993 and is subdivided into 100 centésimos, although centésimos are not currently in use.

== Introduction ==
Uruguay obtained monetary stability in 1896, based on the gold standard. This favorable state of affairs ended after World War I. An unsettled period followed. Economic difficulties after World War II produced inflation, which became serious after 1964 and continued into the 1970s.

The peso moneda nacional was replaced on 1 July 1975 by the nuevo peso (new peso; ISO 4217 code UYP) at a rate of 1 new peso for 1000 old pesos. The nuevo peso was also subdivided into 100 centésimos.

After further inflation, the peso uruguayo (ISO 4217 code UYU) replaced the nuevo peso on March 1, 1993, again at a rate of 1 new for 1000 old.

== Inflation ==
Uruguayans became accustomed to the constant devaluation of their currency. Uruguayans refer to periods of real appreciation of the currency as atraso cambiario, which literally means that "the exchange rate is running late" towards future devaluement. As a consequence of the instability of the local currency, prices for most big-ticket items (real estate, cars and even executives' salaries) are denominated in U.S. dollars.

During the military rule, the peso was on a crawling peg to the dollar. A table of the future value of the dollar was published daily by the government (called the tablita). In 1982, the currency was abruptly devalued ("the tablita was broken"), throwing thousands of companies and individuals into bankruptcy. In the 1990s, a new mechanism to provide predictability was introduced, this time in the form of a sliding range, with top and bottom margins, at which the government would intervene. In 2002, after a banking crisis and amid a huge budget deficit, the currency was again allowed to float, losing almost 50% of its value in a couple of weeks, and, again, throwing into bankruptcy thousands of companies and individuals who held debts denominated in US dollars.

In 2004 a phenomenon completely new to most Uruguayans developed: the currency appreciated in nominal terms against the US dollar, going from 30 to 24 pesos to the dollar. By 2008 the peso reached 19 to the US dollar, recovering more than half of its loss during the crisis. This revaluation hurt exporters and brought protests from the industrial sector, which felt that it lost competitiveness, but by July 2020, the peso had depreciated to over 40 to the dollar. The government hopes that a floating currency will "de-dollarize" the economy. Uruguay does not seem to have found a mechanism that provides the exchange rate some level of predictability, while at the same time allowing the country to adapt its prices so that its exports remain competitive.

== Coins ==
In 1994, stainless-steel 10, 20 and 50 centésimos and brass 1 and 2 pesos uruguayos were introduced. 5 and 10 pesos uruguayos were introduced in 2003 and 2004, respectively. The coins replaced same value notes.

The 10 and 20 cent coins were withdrawn from circulation in 2005, and the 50 cent coin in 2010.

New 1, 2, 5, and 10 pesos coins were introduced in January 2011 with native animal designs. Also a new 50 peso coin was launched.

Coins in circulation are:

| Value | Image | Obverse | Reverse | Weight | Diameter | Thickness | Material | Edge | Issued |
|---|---|---|---|---|---|---|---|---|---|
| 1 U$ | | José Artigas | Un Peso Uruguayo | 3.5 g | 20 mm | 1.5 mm | Aluminium-bronze | Smooth | 1994 |
| 1 U$ | | Uruguayan coat of arms | Armadillo | 3.5 g | 20 mm | 1.5 mm | Brass plated Steel | Smooth | 2011 |
| 2 U$ | | José Artigas | Dos Pesos Uruguayos | 4.5 g | 23 mm | 1.6 mm | Aluminium-bronze | Smooth | 1994 |
| 2 U$ | | Uruguayan coat of arms | Capybara | 4.5 g | 23 mm | 1.6 mm | Brass plated Steel | Smooth | 2011 |
| 5 U$ | | José Artigas | Cinco Pesos Uruguayos | 6.3 g | 26 mm | 1.7 mm | Aluminium-bronze | Smooth | 2003 |
| 5 U$ | | Uruguayan coat of arms | Greater Rhea | 6.3 g | 26 mm | 1.7 mm | Brass | Smooth | 2011 |
| 10 U$ | | José Artigas with the dates of his birth and death | "SEAN LOS ORIENTALES TAN ILUSTRADOS COMO VALIENTES", Signature of José Artigas | 10.4 g | 28 mm | 2.45 mm | Bimetallic: aluminium-bronze center in stainless steel ring | Smooth | 2000 |
| 10 U$ | | Uruguayan coat of arms | Puma in front of rising sun with 19 rays | 10.4 g | 28 mm | 2.45 mm | Bimetallic | Smooth | 2011 |
| 50 U$ | | Radiant sun with face, "BICENTENARIO DE LOS HECHOS HISTORICOS" • 1811-2011 • | José Artigas | 10.4 g | 28 mm | 2.45 mm | Copper plated steel | Reeded | 2011 |

== Banknotes ==
In 1995–1996, banknotes in denominations of 5, 10, 20, 50, 100, 200, 500 (all modified versions of 5,000, 10,000, 20,000, 50,000, 100,000, 200,000 and 500,000 nuevo peso banknotes respectively) and 1000 pesos uruguayos were introduced, followed by new models of 5 and 10 pesos uruguayos notes in 1999. In 2003, 5 and 10 pesos uruguayos notes have been replaced by coins and 2000 pesos uruguayos were introduced. A new series of banknotes was introduced in 2014–2015, the same as the previous issue without the vertical word "URUGUAY" on the left side. In 2020 and 2021, polymer banknotes in denominations of 20 and 50 pesos uruguayos began being issued. Banknotes in circulation are:

| Images | | Value | Description | | | Years of issue |
| Obverse | Reverse | Value | Obverse | Reverse | Watermark | Years of issue |
|---|---|---|---|---|---|---|
| | | $20 | Juan Zorrilla de San Martín | La leyenda patria | 20 and electrotype 20, Veinte | 2015; 2018; 2020 (polymer, series A); 2021 (polymer, series B) |
| | | $50 | José Pedro Varela | Monumento a José Pedro Varela | 50 and electrotype 50, Cincuenta | 2015; 2020 (polymer, series A); 2021 (polymer, series B) |
| | | $100 | Eduardo Fabini | God Pan | 100 and electrotype 100, Cien | 2015; 2019 |
| | | $200 | Pedro Figari | "Baile Antiguo" (Old Dance) | 200 and electrotype 200, Doscientos | 2015; 2019; 2025 |
| | | $500 | Alfredo Vásquez Acevedo | University of the Republic, Montevideo | 500 and electrotype 500, Quinientos | 2014; 2015; 2020 |
| | | $1000 | Juana de Ibarbourou | Ibarbourou Square, books | 1000 and electrotype 1000, Mil | 2014; 2020; 2021 |
| | | $2000 | Dámaso Antonio Larrañaga | National Library, Montevideo | 2000 and electrotype 2000, Dos Mil | 2015; 2020; 2021 |

=== Commemorative banknote ===
In 2018, the Central Bank of Uruguay issued banknotes of 50 pesos uruguayos to commemorate its 50th anniversary. It is Uruguay's first banknote to be printed in plastic (polymer) material.

Current UYU exchange rates
| From Google Finance: | AUD CAD CHF CNY EUR GBP HKD JPY USD ARS BRL |
| From Yahoo! Finance: | AUD CAD CHF CNY EUR GBP HKD JPY USD ARS BRL |
| From XE.com: | AUD CAD CHF CNY EUR GBP HKD JPY USD ARS BRL |
| From OANDA: | AUD CAD CHF CNY EUR GBP HKD JPY USD ARS BRL |

== Central Bank Digital Currency (CBDC) ==
Although in many parts of the world, the amount of cash in circulation has risen over the last decade, there are some countries that buck the trend. In this small club of jurisdictions, a few have considered general purpose CBDCs that would be a complement to cash. Sweden and Uruguay are notable not just for the advanced stage of their work but the amount of information their central banks have made publicly available about their respective projects.

== Unidad Previsional (UP) ==
Uruguay maintains a currency account unit named Unidad Previsional (UP), ISO 4217 code UYW.

== Unidad Indexada (UI) ==
The Unidad Indexada (UI), ISO 4217 code UYI, is a consumer price indicator for Uruguay. When it was introduced on June 1, 2002, it had a value of exactly one peso uruguayo.

== See also ==
- Economy of Uruguay
- Argentine peso
- Chilean peso
- Classical Monetary System of the Oriental Republic of Uruguay
