= Bolsa de Valores de Montevideo =

Coordinates: 34°54′25.73″S 56°12′22.06″W

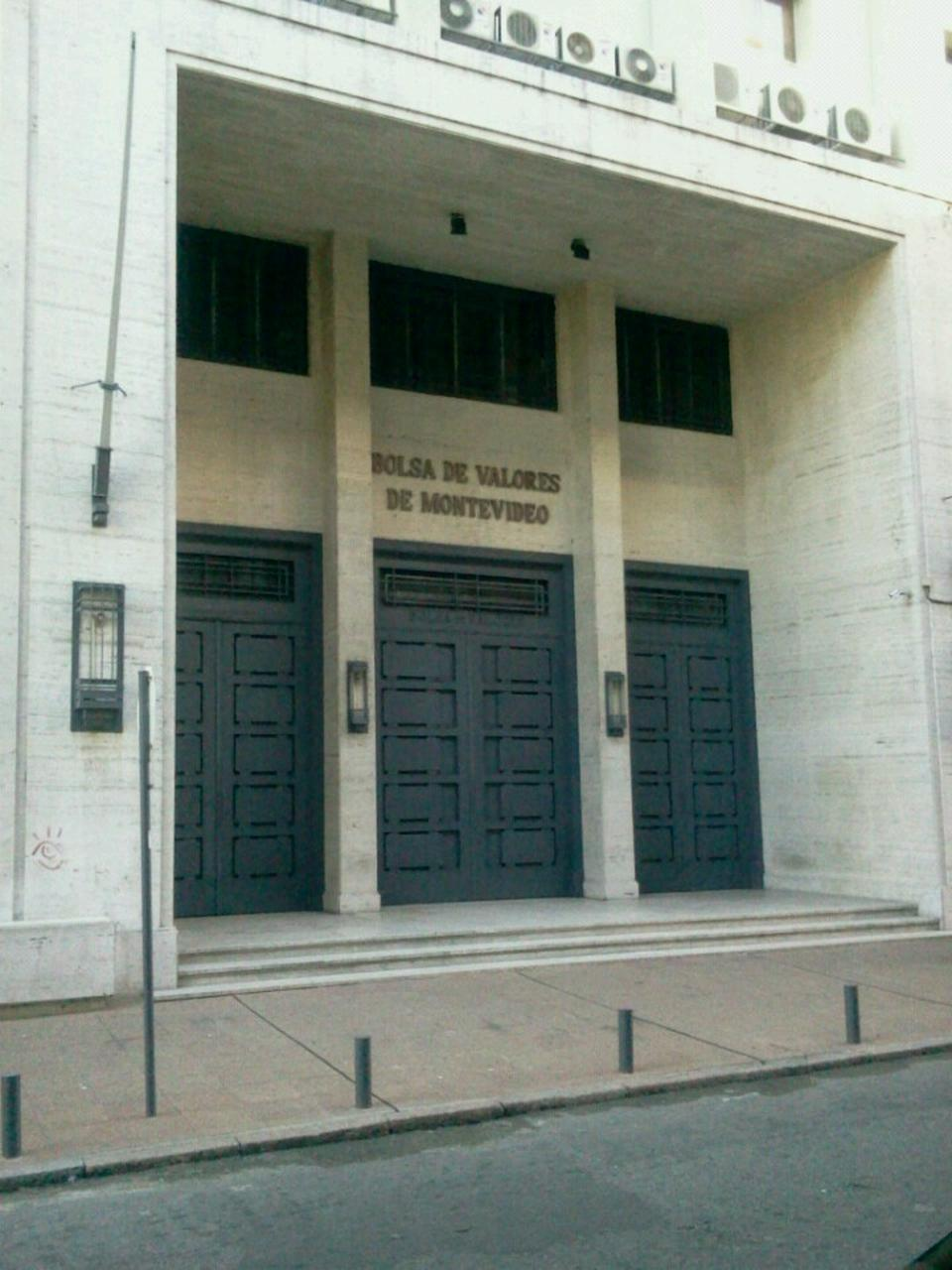
- Location: Montevideo, Uruguay
- Founded: 1867

The Montevideo Stock Exchange or Bolsa de Valores de Montevideo (BVM), also known as the Bolsa de Montevideo, is the principal stock exchange of Uruguay. It is based in Montevideo and was founded in 1867. The institution's primary function is to provide a platform for the realization of laying operations, trading and safekeeping of public and private securities.

Trading involves the buying and selling of existing securities in the secondary market. Securities custody is a service that provides support and security to investors, reducing the risk of loss, theft or forgery.

In addition to providing services to its members, the BVM also provides services to the issuers of securities and to society as a whole.

The exchange's transactions total almost 3 billion annually.

BVM can hold operations for stockbrokers and special partners. Stockbrokers must be members of the BVM and meet the requirements determined by the Uruguayan laws and regulations of the Central Bank of Uruguay. Special partners are institutions authorized to operate that do not have quality partnership from BVM. Special Members may be banks, fund managers, pensions, social security institutions or insurance companies.

The BVM is administered by a committee composed of seven members. In addition the Board has a BVM Fiscal Commission and a Court of Ethics, composed of stockbrokers.

== History ==
The Montevideo Stock Exchange has its origins in the nineteenth century, when the "Montevideo Bag Society" was created in 1867. Its main aim was to provide trade of the square of a meeting point at a fixed time, to treat the business of the day.

Simultaneously, two business bodies were created: The Chambre Syndicale, representing the interests of commerce, and the Intern Brokers Commission, which regulated the activity of both.

In 1921 the Commission became a civil non-profitable association, which worked as a field of stock trading and brokers guild. In 1952 this committee was renamed the "Stock Exchange". In 1997 the stock market was separated from the Stock Exchange and in 2004 adopted its current name "Montevideo Stock Exchange."

During the first decade of the twentieth century stock market operations grew strongly. Between 1929 and 1933 there was a period of decline in market activity due to the crisis of 1929. From 1934 to 1947 growth came back being more involved with the growth of private equity. Between 1950 and 1970 activity shrank, persisting a shift towards short-term bank loans and the purchase of government securities.

The return to growth occurred between 1970 and 1985 but, after that last year, the share of private equity shrank. In 1995 it was decided to incorporate financial institutions as special partners. In 1996 the trading activity was favored with the appearance of the Savings Fund Administrators (AFAP) and the Securities Market Act and Notes. The following year, the BVM developed its System Clearing, Settlement and Custody. In 2008 it began operating with the electronic Spanish Stock Market Integrated System (SIBE).

In Uruguay in the late nineteenth century and early twentieth century, many enterprises began life taking capital from the market's risk. At the time nearly 50 national companies came to list its shares on the stock.

== Regulation ==
The BVM is regulated and supervised by the Central Bank of Uruguay in accordance with Law No. 18,627 (2 December 2009), amending Law No. 16,749 (Law on the Stock and Negotiable Obligations Market, 30 May 1996).

In accordance with the law, stock exchanges "are understood to have as their objective the provision to their members of the necessary means to effectively carry out securities transactions via public auction, and other activities of securities mediation, in accordance with the law and with the regulations imposed by the Financial Services Administration" of the Central Bank of Uruguay.

Article 90 of the regulation establishes that stock exchanges require "prior authorization from the Financial Services Administration" to operate. Stock exchanges should "regulate their activity, ensuring strict compliance with the aforementioned regulations, in order to safeguard the existence of a competitive, organized, and transparent market, regardless of the regulatory powers of the Financial Services Administration". In addition, they must "ensure strict compliance on the part of their members with the highest ethical principles and all applicable legal and regulatory orders".

Law No. 18,627 was put into regulation by Decree No. 322/011 (16 September 2011) and by Memorandum No. 2,056 of the Central Bank of Uruguay (26 February 2010).

== International ties ==
The Montevideo Stock Exchange is a member of the Federación Iberoamericana de Bolsas (FIAB), an organization of stock exchanges in Latin America, Spain, and Portugal. The FIAB's mission consists of encouraging collaboration among its members, with the aim of promoting the development and improvement of their respective stock markets and financial instruments, in the best interest of all participants. The FIAB held its General Assembly in Uruguay twice, in 1988 and 2008.

It is also a member of the Americas Central Securities Depositories Association, a non-profit organization based in Lima, Peru, consisting of securities depositories and clearing houses in the Americas. Its by-laws were agreed to at the first General Assembly in the city of Lima on 10 August 1999. In October 2005 the ACSDA Executive Committee met in Punta del Este.

== See also ==
- List of companies listed on the Montevideo Stock Exchange
- Economy of Uruguay
- List of stock exchanges
- List of American stock exchanges
- Americas Central Securities Depositories Association
- Mercosur
