= Banco de Previsión Social =

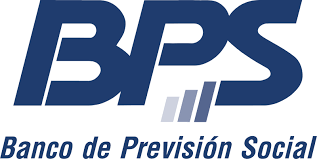

Agency overview
- Formed: 1967
- Jurisdiction: Uruguay
- Headquarters: Montevideo
- Employees: 3859 (2023)
- Annual budget: $14,67 billion USD(2024)
- Agency executive: Jimena Pardo, President
- Website: https://www.bps.gub.uy/

Banco de Previsión Social (Spanish for 'Social Insurance Bank') is the state-owned Uruguayan social security institute. Institutionalized in the Constitution of 1967, it is in charge of coordinating, organizing and executing state social welfare and social security services.

== History ==
Uruguay was one of the first countries in Latin America to have a social security system. However, in its origins, it was a set of various retirement funds created between the end of the 19th century and the beginning of the 20th century: Caja Escolar (1896-1934), Caja Civil (1904-1934, 1948-1967), Caja Military (1911), Public Services Employees Fund (1919), Jockey Club Employees Fund (1923), Bank Employees Fund (1925), Industry and Commerce Fund (1928-1934, 1948-1967), and the Industry, Commerce and Public Services Fund (1934-1948). In 1919 an old age pension law was passed. Finally, the 1967 Constitution institutionalized the Banco de Previsión Social, which unified the most numerous savings banks in number of affiliates: Civil, Industry and Commerce, and Rural.

During the civil-military dictatorship, the body was replaced by the General Directorate of Social Security through Institutional Act No. 9, of October 23, 1979. However, the institution would recover its previous name after the approval of Law N° 15,800, of January 17, 1989.

== Activities ==
According to the Law, BPS is responsible for the coordination of the state social welfare services and organisation of social security. It grants services, loans and benefits such as pensions, non-contributive old age allowances, family subsidies, disability and care allowances, housing allowances, unemployment and sickness insurance. It collects and handle tributes such as the employee and business contributions to the social security system and the National Health Fund (FONASA).

It keeps the work history registry and other records of its passive, active and contributing members, such as the active business registry jointly with the General Tax Directorate. It has the responsibility to propose laws relating to social security. It also has the attribution of being consulted regarding any project or initiative relating to social security.
