= State Railways Administration of Uruguay =

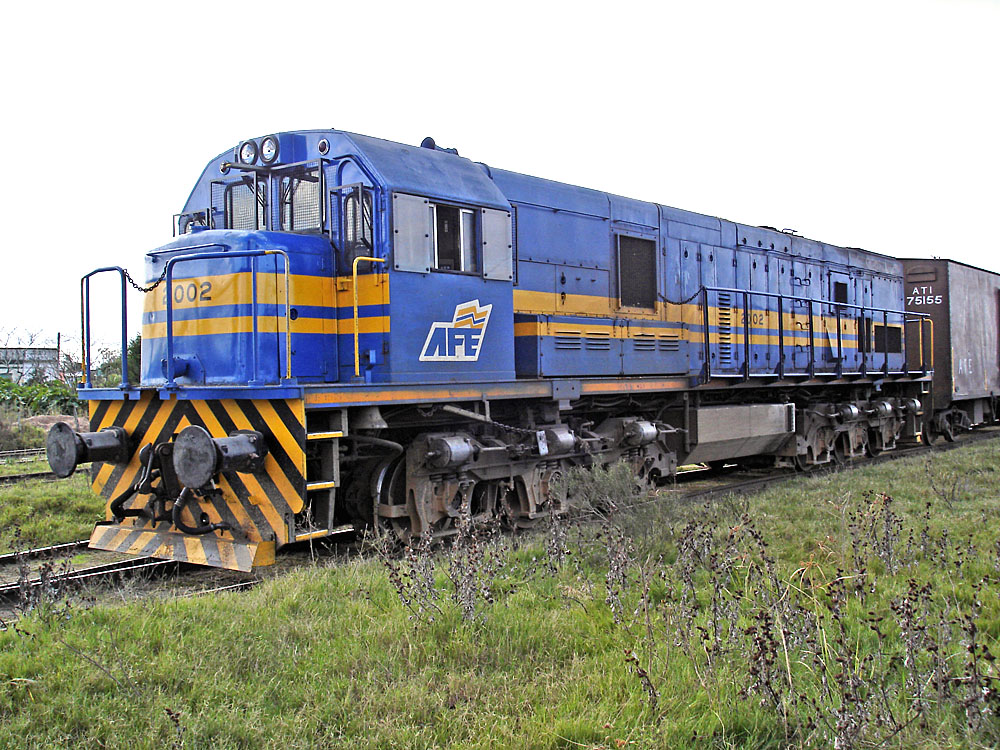
- GE C18-7i diesel locomotive
- Native name: Administración de Ferrocarriles del Estado
- Company type: State-owned
- Industry: Rail transport
- Predecessor: Central UR (CUR); Midland UR; North Western UR; Northern UR
- Founded: 1952; 74 years ago
- Headquarters: Montevideo, Uruguay
- Services: Public transport
- Owner: Government of Uruguay
- Website: afe.com.uy

The State Railways Administration of Uruguay (Spanish: Administración de Ferrocarriles del Estado), or AFE, is the autonomous agency of the Oriental Republic of Uruguay charged with rail transport and the maintenance of Uruguayan railways.

== History ==
On 31 December 1948, Parliament approved projects for acquiring foreign railroads, discharging part of the £17 million which was owed to Uruguay by the United Kingdom because of purchases made during World War II. On 31 January 1949, the railroads were nationalized. That August, the executive branch of government proposed to the General Assembly the creation of a body known as the Land Transport Management of the State (ATTE), charged with the following:

- Manage passenger and freight transport by road
- Operate and maintain the rail network
- Provide services on roads built and maintained by the Ministry of Transportation

The monopoly would gradually prepare to take over private enterprises, and the proposal was based on the need to avoid ruinous competition. Having difficulty obtaining approval, the Executive decided not to pursue the proposal and allow the new entity to limit its function to the operation of rail transport. Meanwhile, between 31 January 1949 and 19 September 1952 the country held two state railways: the Ferrocarril Central del Uruguay (for nationalized companies) and the state railway and tram network, which remained at the forefront of its former operations. The two companies were merged with the creation of the State Railways Administration (AFE) on 19 September 1952.

== Recent developments ==
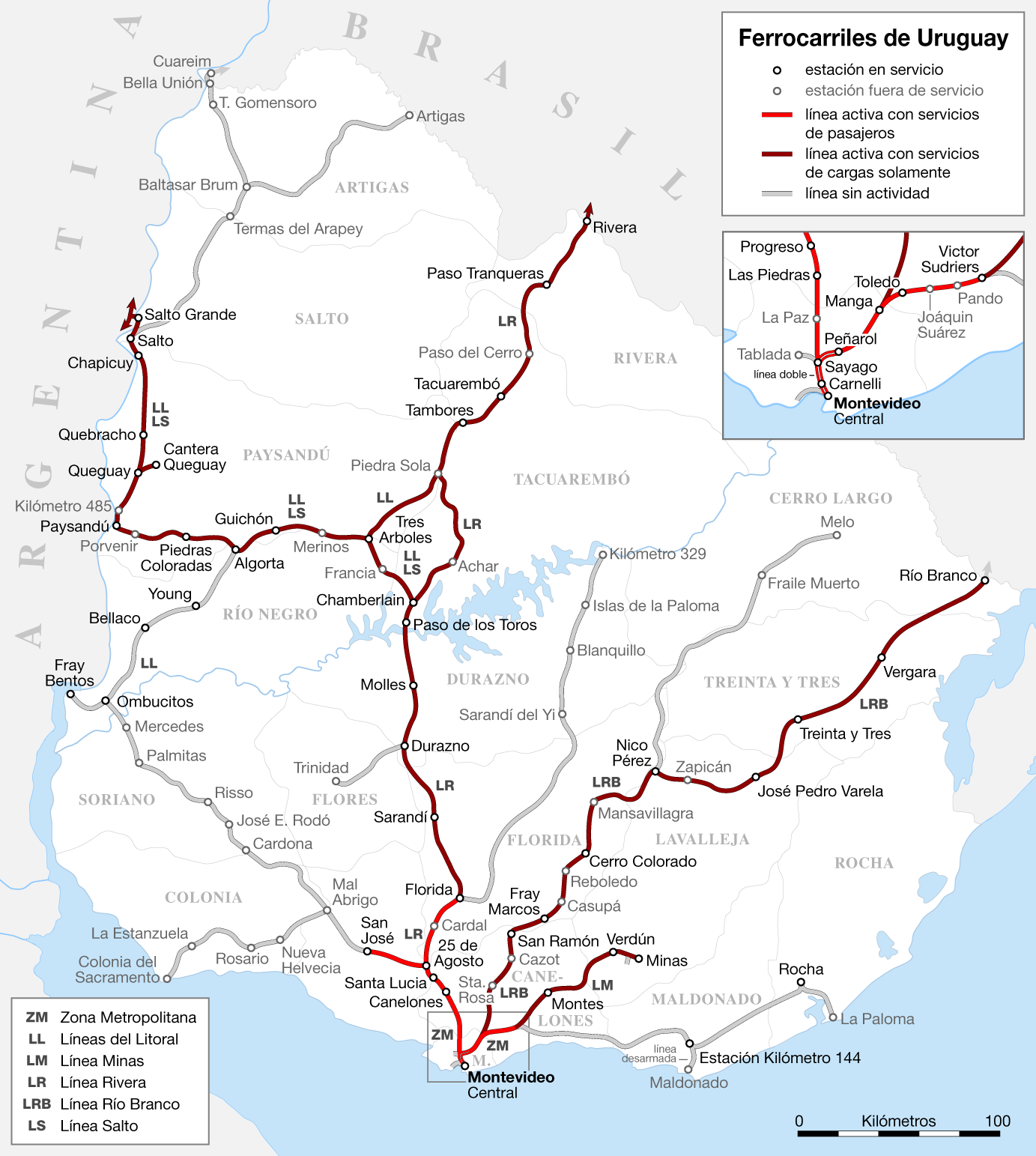
Uruguayan railway network map

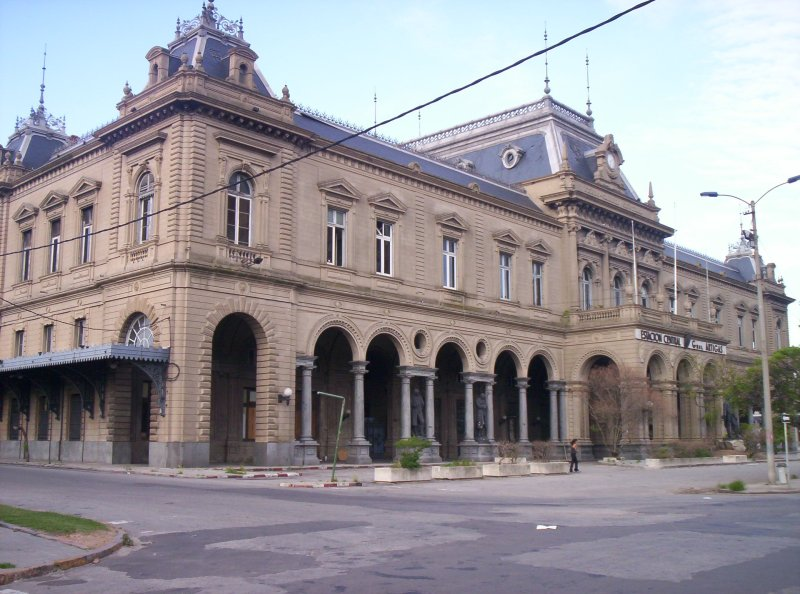
Facade of Central Station Gral. Artigas, closed in 2003

Uruguayan railways have approximately 2,900 kilometres (1,800 mi) of track, all 1,435 mm (4 ft 8 1/2 in) standard gauge, diesel traction and with only 11 kilometres (6.8 mi) of double track. Half of the network is closed, with freight trains circulating branches from Montevideo – Rivera – Livramento; Piedra Sola – Three Trees; Sayago – Minas; Verdum – Plant ANCAP; Carnelli – La Teja; Chamberlain – Paysandú – Salto – Concordia and Algorta – Fray Bentos. The branch from 25 de Agosto – San Jose – Ombucitos is under renovation, and the stretch to San Jose was reopened for passenger service in December 2006.

Passenger service is provided by three suburban lines, starting from Montevideo to the north (to Florida, 109 km), the west (San Jose, 96 km sharing Line 63 to August 25) and the northeast (Mr. Victor Sudriers, 44 km, sharing the first 8 km with the other two). Since 1 March 2003, passenger trains depart and arrive at a new terminal 500 meters north of the Central Station in Montevideo (which has been closed); this entailed a loss of more than 100,000 passengers. The State Railways Administration is the administrator of the rail network. It permits movement of rolling stock from other companies and institutions, and several have their own cars and locomotives (ANCAP, AUAR, CEFU, CUCP).

=== Ferrocarril Central Project ===
In 2019 the Finnish forest industry company UPM Kymmene started the construction of a pulp mill in Pueblo Centenario, near Tacuarembo's Paso de Los Toros. Pulp for paper production is to be transported from the plant to Montevideo's Harbor and chemicals in the opposite direction by rail. The rebuilding project "Ferrocarril Central" (en:Central Railway) named after the previous owner of the line was put out to tender. The winner was "Grupo Via Central" (en: Central Track Group) formed by Uruguayan engineering companies "Saceem" and "Berkes" alongside the Spanish company Sacyr and French Groupe NGE. On Friday June 14 of 2019 the last Montevideo to 25 de Agosto service left the New Terminal station in Montevideo. Rebuilding was intended to be finished within 3 years.

The project sparked controversy regarding environment and politics, opponents naming it "UPM's train". Amongst others requirements they asked for passenger services. The MTOP (Ministry of Transport and Public Infrastructure works) stated that rebuilding could only be viable with freight traffic generating income to maintain the line for both freight and passenger traffic. About the same time the railways administration AFE as the state owned owner of the railway infrastructure allowed open access to any train operator paying fees for use of tracks.

After the last train had run in 2019, dismantling tracks of the central line between Montevideo and Pueblo Centenario started. Bolts and plates were removed, keeping track segments together allowing the posterior installation of the old tracks in other branches of the rail network with heavily degraded tracks. Acquisition of ground near the line, including expropriation, was done to allow widening the alignment. In the following years ground movement included the construction of two trenches, one in the Capirro Neighborhood of Montevideo with a length of 800m and another one in Las Piedras city with 1200m of length (including the historic station that was conserved while a new subway-like station was built underground). A bridge was built for road Route 102 to cross level free, also allowing the road to bypass Cesar Mayo Gutierrez street. The access Viaduct at Canelones and multiple additional bypasses in many other streets and cities was built. The government also greenlighted the construction of a Harbor access viaduct in the Rambla separating high-speed transit ingression and leaving Montevideo from the low-speed freight transit in the Harbor and the future rail transport. Track installation began in late 2022 with new continuously welded rail on Uruguayan sleepers (made by the Spanish company Sateba's engineering and local materials) and Vossloh fastenings. Revenga RailRox level crossing equipment and European Train Control System compatible system were used. Double track was laid between Montevideo (Nova Central Station and Harbor's branch) and Villa Felicidad neighborhood in Progreso, Canelones. Work was completed Monday November 20 of 2023, followed by testing.

UPM choose freight operator Portren, a joint venture consisting of Deutsche Bahn from Germany, CHR Group and Cointer Concessions, the contract allowing Portren to use 45% of the line capacity, the remaining 55% being reserved for other open access operators. Protren's rolling stock is composed of 7 Stadler Euro 4001 (the first of their class in the continent) built in Valencia, Spain, 120 wood pulp wagons and 20 sulfuric acid wagons made by Talleres Allecria in Spain. The first locomotive to leave the port was the Portren04 Locomotive, moved by truck because the tracks were not completed. Portren02 and Portren05 left on their own wheels in December (4th and 18th respectively), with Portren02 hauling three wood pulp wagons (103, 111 and 116) while Portren05 carried a longer train.

== Rolling stock ==
AFE rolling stock consists of:

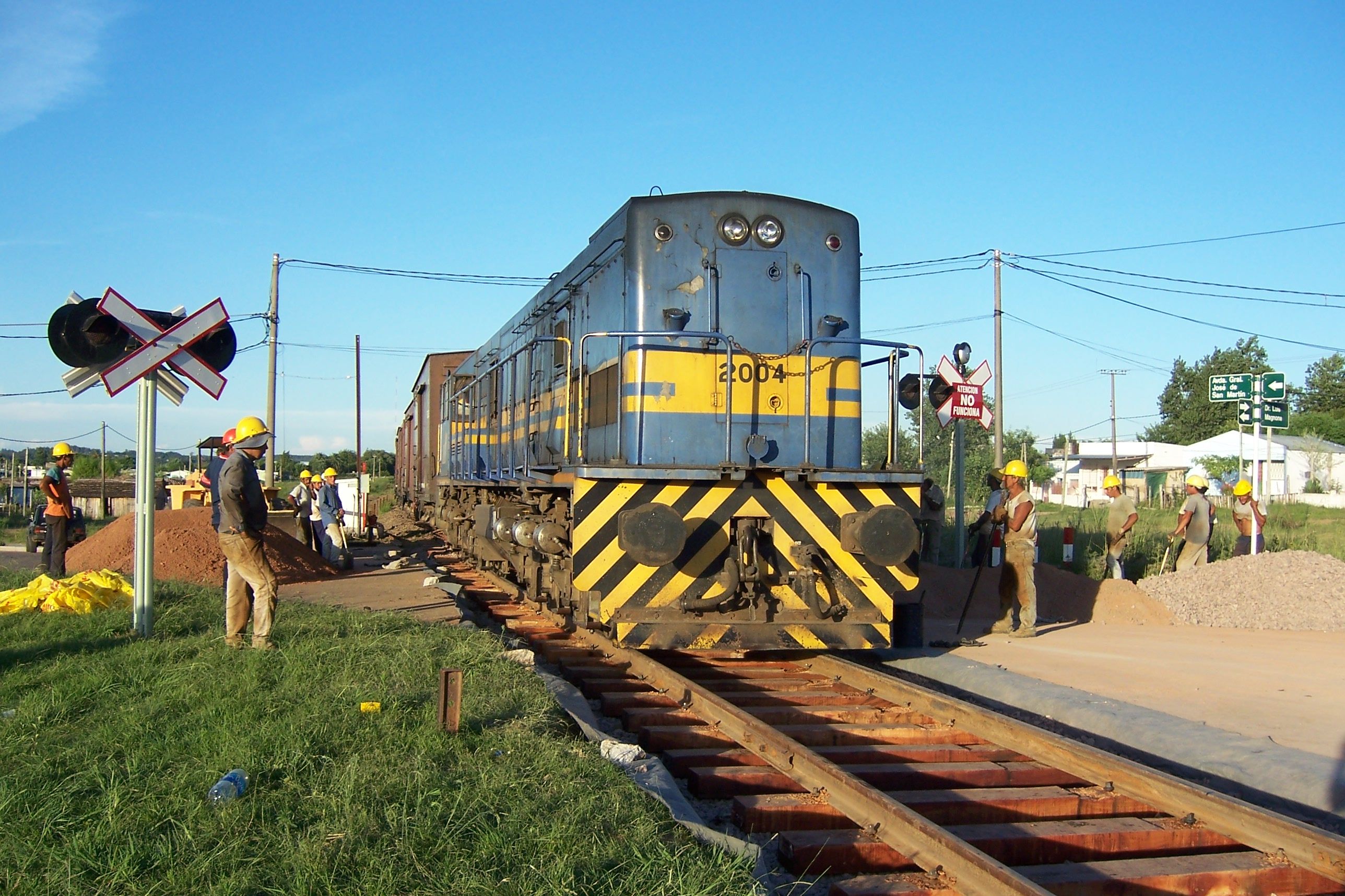
Canadian General Electric Locomotive C-18 during renovation of level crossing at San Martin Avenue in Tacuarembó

- 5 Italian-Swedish Kalmar Verkstad/Fiat Y1 railcars. They were acquired in agreement between UTE, ANTEL, ANCAP and Banco República in 2013. Manufactured between 1979 and 1981 and reconstructed in 2002 (including the replacement of the original FIAT engines for new Volvo D10H engines). They come from Sweden where they were in service., these motorcars came painted Grey with Yellow horizontal stripe, upper half of doors and oversides but many of them were plotted with marketing material for ANCAP, UTE and ANTEL; Their status is as follows:
  - In service: cars 1273, 1310, 1317, 1354
  - Out of service: cars 1333
- 10 Canadian General Electric Locomotives C-18-7i-1993, 1,800 hp (1,300 kW), numbered 2001 to 2010 (all in service) originally sky-blue with two light yellow stripes and a yellow and black striped (front and back), in 2013 with the creation of Freight Transport Servicios Logisticos Ferroviarios S.A (SELF S.A, esp:Rail Logistic Services Inc.) as a joint venture of AFE and the CND (Corporación Nacional para el Desarrollo, esp:National Corporstion for Development); the locomotives were transferred to the new operator that rebuilds and replaces many pieces before repainting the locomotives in a new yellow and black livery that draws inspiration from the historical association between Barrio Peñarol in Montrvideo (where the rebuilding process took part, and historical site of AFE and CUR workshop) and the homonymous Football Soccer club.
- 9 General Electric ALCO 1500 locomotives, a total of 47 locomotives which arrived in two shipments: 20 in 1952 (numbered 1501 to 1520) and 27 in 1954 (numbered from 1521 to 1547). Nine of them are still serviceable (1505, 1506, 1515, 1519, 1525, 1530, 1539, 1545, 1547) but they are in Peñarol workshops waiting to be repaired (their last livery before reconstruction was a dark green with horizontal yellow stripe and black and yellow striped front); The still working units also were transferred to SELF with the plan to rebuild them, the 1530 has been rebuilt and repainted in a similar livery.
- 19 Alsthom locomotives, out of 25 acquired in 1963 (originally in a white, red and blue livery; repainted in dark green with yellow stripe and finally in the same livery than the GE 1800 locomotives). Between 1988 and 1991, 15 were rebuilt with new engines at the Peñarol shop. Their status is as follows:
  - In service (rebuilt): 801, 803, 805 (Still in AFE, rebuilt in Pelarol and repainted in its original colors), 806, 809 (Now in SELF, rebuilt and repainted in black and yellow), 810, 811, 812, 813, 816, 817, 818, 819, 820 and 824
  - In service (original condition): 802, 814, 822 and 825
- 16 Diesel-hydraulic trains from the Hungarian manufacturer Ganz-MÁVAG. One locomotive is in service and two are undergoing repair; the trains consist of a locomotive and first- and second-class cars which arrived between 1977 and 1978 during the Civico-Military dictatorships with the purpose of modernizing the Montevideo-Punta del Este line competing with Uruguay's then main Coach company ONDA S.A.; this stock originally came with an orange and blue livery but was repainted in green with a horizontal yellow stripe and black and yellow striped front and back. The stock was neglected: vandalized, cannibalized for repairs, damaged by weather or used for commercial projects (such as a railway exhibition in 1993, when all 16 were cleared for commercial use by several companies). The status of the locomotives is:
  - In service: 916.
  - Undergoing repairs: 910 and 913.
  - Repairable: 901, 902, 903, 904, 907, 908, 909, 914 and 915.
  - In disrepair: 905, 906, 911 and 912.
- Four Brill model 60 motorcars (arriving between 1934 and 1937—numbers 121, 122, 123 and 127); the remainder were scrapped, Originally gasoline-powered their original engines were replaced with diesel-powered 6-cylinder 208HP Cummins NHHB-60 engines, motorcar 121 gearbox was replaced with Scania G770 six speed transmission, motorcar 122 Cummins engine was replaced by a Volvo TDH10 engine recovered from a scrapped Volvo B58E bus that operated in Montevideo main private urban bus lines operator, CUTCSA.
- Two German VT 795 railbuses, survivors of 28 cars and 28 trailers (of two different types) bought used from German railways between 1980 and 1983. This stock was bought during the last years of the Civico-Military dictatorships with the purpose of revitalizing passenger rail transport in the Montevideo-25 de Agosto and Montevideo-Pando lines competing with private owned bus companies and cooperatives, this stock was painted in a cream with blue lower sides and yellow and black striped front.
- Argentinian Fiat Concorde passenger cars, cream with blue undersides livery, green leather seats, some of them have a cargo room for bikes and similar size objects, all cars have luggage racks.
- Six locomotives from three different manufacturers: General Electric Model 25-ton (numbers 201–204); Nippon Sharyo 41-ton No. 205 (in service) and General Electric 44-ton No. 409.
- Out of service: ALCO 1953 MRS-1 locomotive (abandoned at Peñarol, acquired as donation/gift from the U.S. Army after its decommission, its last livery was the same dark green and yellow livery than the ALCO and Ganz-Mavag stock); GE 44-ton locomotive numbers 402, 408 and 410 (some of them were transferred to SELF S.A.).

== See also ==
- Rail transport in Uruguay
