= List of Uruguayan economists =

A list of notable Uruguayan economists:

- Isaac Alfie
- Azucena Arbeleche
- Danilo Astori
- Mario Bergara
- Alberto Couriel
- Ariel Davrieux
- Ramón Díaz
- Gaston Gelos
- Enrique V. Iglesias
- Fernando Lorenzo
- Daniel Olesker
- Ricardo Pascale
- Arturo C. Porzecanski
- Alejandro Végh Villegas
