= José Batlle y Ordóñez =

Uruguayan politician (1856–1929)

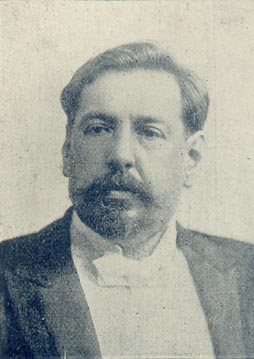
- José Batlle y Ordóñez

19th and 21st President of Uruguay
- In office 1 March 1911 – 1 March 1915
- Preceded by: Claudio Williman
- Succeeded by: Feliciano Viera
- In office 1 March 1903 – 1 March 1907
- Preceded by: Juan Lindolfo Cuestas
- Succeeded by: Claudio Williman
- In office 5 February 1899 – 1 March 1899; Acting
- Preceded by: Juan Lindolfo Cuestas
- Succeeded by: Juan Lindolfo Cuestas

2nd and 5th President of the National Council of Administration
- In office 1 March 1921 – 1 March 1923
- President: Baltasar Brum
- Preceded by: Feliciano Viera
- Succeeded by: Julio María Sosa
- In office 1 March 1927 – 16 February 1928
- President: Juan Campisteguy
- Preceded by: Luis Alberto de Herrera
- Succeeded by: Luis Caviglia

President of the Senate of Uruguay
- In office 1899–1900
- Preceded by: Carlos de Castro
- Succeeded by: Juan Carlos Blanco Fernández
- In office 1903–1903
- Preceded by: Juan Carlos Blanco Fernández
- Succeeded by: Juan P. Castro

Member of the Senate of Uruguay
- In office 9 February 1899 – 5 February 1902
- Constituency: Montevideo Department
- In office 8 February 1902 – 1 March 1903
- Constituency: Montevideo Department

Member of the Chamber of Representatives
- In office 15 February 1891 – 14 February 1894
- Constituency: Salto Department

Personal details
- Born: 21 May 1856 Montevideo, Uruguay
- Died: 20 October 1929 (aged 73) Montevideo, Uruguay
- Party: Colorado Party
- Spouse: Matilde Pacheco
- Relations: Duncan Stewart (uncle-in-law); Luis Batlle Berres (nephew); Matilde Ibáñez Tálice (niece-in-law); Jorge Batlle (grandnephew)
- Children: César; Rafael; Lorenzo; Amalia Ana; Ana Amalia
- Parent: Lorenzo Batlle y Grau (father)
- Occupation: Journalist
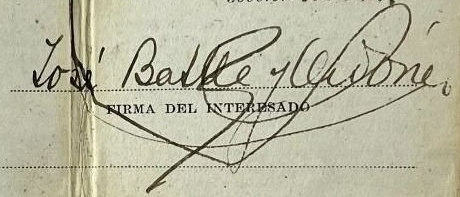
- Signature

José Pablo Torcuato Batlle y Ordóñez (Note: Batlle himself wrote the surname Ordóñez as Ordoñez without the accent on the second o. Official documents generally used the accent.) ([ˈbaʒe] or [ˈbaʃe] (Note: Catalan pronunciation: [ˈbaʎ.ʎə]); 23 May 1856 – 20 October 1929), nicknamed Don Pepe, was a prominent Uruguayan politician who served two terms as President of Uruguay for the Colorado Party. The son of a former president, he introduced his political system, Batllism, to South America and modernized Uruguay through his creation of extensive welfare state reforms.

In 1898, Batlle served as interim president for a few weeks. He was later elected to the presidency for two terms: from 1903 to 1907 and from 1911 to 1915. He remains one of the most popular Uruguayan presidents, mainly due to his role as a social reformer. Influenced by Krausist liberalism, he is known for influencing the introduction of universal suffrage and the eight-hour workday, as well as free high school education. He was one of the main promoters of Uruguayan secularization, which led to the separation of the state and the Catholic Church. Education started a process of great expansion from the mid-to-late 19th century onward. It became the key to success for the middle class community. The state established free high school education and created more high schools through the country. The University of the Republic was also opened to women, and educational enrollment increased throughout the country. Batlle also "revitalized the Colorado party and strengthened its liberal tradition, giving way to ideas of general and universal interest, and favoring the right of the working class to organize and put forward just demands."

Government intervention in the economy increased during Batlle's tenure. Batlle nationalized Montevideo's electric power plant, and BROU (a savings and loan institution that monopolized the printing of money). He established industrial institutes for geology and drilling (coal and hydrocarbon explorations), industrial chemistry, and fisheries. In 1914, the administration purchased the North Tramway and Railway Company, which later became the State Railways Administration of Uruguay. He implemented protectionist policies for industry. Indigenous companies also emerged, although foreign capital (especially from Britain and the United States), as noted by one study, "also took advantage of the legislation and came to control the meat industry. The growth of the frigorífico meat-processing industry also stimulated the interbreeding of livestock, Uruguay's main source of wealth." Batlle believed in government intervention in the economy, and criticized economic inequality.

== Early life and background ==
Batlle was born in Montevideo on 23 May 1856 to Lorenzo Batlle y Grau and Amalia Ordoñez. Batlle's grandfather, José Batlle y Carreó, had arrived in Montevideo on his own ship with Batlle's grandmother from Sitges, a town near Barcelona, and built a flour mill which won a contract to provision the Royal Spanish Navy in Montevideo. Batlle's grandfather was loyal to the Spanish crown through both the British invasions of the River Plate and the first and second attempts to secure Uruguayan independence from Spain led by José Gervasio Artigas, and subsequently returned to Spain in 1814, and the rest of the Batlle family followed in 1818. Batlle's grandmother died in Sitges in 1823, and his grandfather subsequently returned to Montevideo in 1833 to reopen the flour mill. Batlle's father Lorenzo had been born in Uruguay in 1810, and returned to Montevideo three years before the rest of the family in 1830, after an extensive education in France and Spain. Batlle's father quickly joined and became prominent within the Colorados, and was involved in the Uruguayan Civil War, notably personally escorting Fructuoso Rivera to exile in Brazil in 1847. Lorenzo Batlle married Batlle's mother, the daughter of another Colorado guerrilla, during the Uruguayan Civil War.

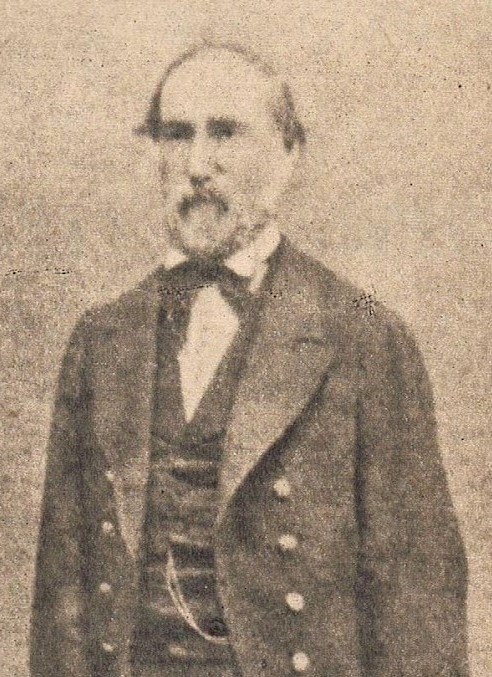
A photo of Batlle's father, Lorenzo Batlle y Grau, taken some time before 1888

The Batlle family were prohombres (prominent figures) within the Colorado Party, with five of Batlle's relatives serving as president. Batlle's father Lorenzo had served as Minister of War during the Great Siege of Montevideo, and was elected President of Uruguay in 1868 when Batlle was 12 years old. Batlle's children César, Rafael and Lorenzo were actively engaged in politics, with César and Lorenzo serving in. He was also the uncle of another Uruguayan president, Luis Batlle Berres, and the great-uncle of President Jorge Batlle, and his uncle-in-law Duncan Stewart served as acting president for three weeks in 1894.

After attending an English school in Montevideo, Batlle began studying at the University of the Republic. At university, he became involved in the discussions and debates between the 'idealists' and 'positivists'. Led by Prudencio Váquez y Vega, Batlle was a prominent member of the idealists. Batlle's political ideology was influenced by the work of philosopher Heinrich Ahrens, whose work was introduced to Batlle by Váquez y Vega. Ahrens 'Course of Natural Law,' as one study noted, "exalted the human personality and made proposals for the reform of society based on the innate dignity of man." Batlle acknowledged a great debt later in life to Váquez y Vega, writing in 1913 on the title page of a gift copy of Ahrens "in this great work I formed my criterion of the law and it has served me as a guide in my public life." Batlle left university in 1879 without completing his law degree, and the following year a 24-year-old Batlle convinced his father to let him study for a year in Paris, where he took a course in English and sat in on philosophy lectures at the Sorbonne and Collège de France before returning home when money ran out.

Batlle also became a prominent journalist. In 1878 Batlle and a friend founded a rationalist journal, 'El Espíritu Nuevo,' whose mission was "the total emancipation of the American spirit from the tutelage of the Old World." Batlle contributed scientific articles and poetry to the review, and later that year started contributing articles to a Montevideo newspaper. His first article, published 3 days before he turned 23, was an attack on the dictatorship of Colonel Lorenzo Latorre. In 1881 Batlle assumed the editorship of La Razon to oppose the government of General Santos. Batlle was exposed to all kinds of threats until one night his house was assaulted and an attempt made against the life of his father at whom shots were fired but which fortunately missed their mark.

In 1885, Batlle returned to the journalistic field in company with the famous journalist Dr. Teofilo D. Gil. He and Gil devoted themselves to preparing the public sentiment for a revolutionary outbreak. As noted by one study, however, "Hardly had the opportunity arrived when Batlle, who had started with Rufino T. Dominguez the organization of the first battalion of volunteers, abandoned the pen of the journalist, emigrated to Buenos Aires, and devoted himself exclusively to the work of a soldier, until the unfortunate issue of the struggle at Quebracho."

In 1886, Batlle founded the newspaper El Día, which he used as a political platform for criticizing his opponents and promoting his reformist agenda. That same year Batlle undertook a campaign in El Día on behalf of the children in an orphan asylum and of pauper maniacs in an insane asylum. This campaign, one study noted, "had the excellent result of depriving the City Council of Montevideo of the control of public charity and entrusting it to a commission of distinguished citizens." When a new revolutionary movement started at Buenos Aires, Batlle removed there to act as secretary to Colonel Galeano. However, the movement died in its inception, and returning to Montevideo Batlle again assumed the editorship of El Día. By March 1887 however, as noted by one study, "Batlle was ready to launch upon a new aspect of his life's work, that of reorganizing and revivifying the Colorado Party." Batlle's time in the journalistic battle had convinced him that the Colorado Party still had a "powerful vitality" but had been seriously discredited and comprised by several dictatorships carrying the Colorado label. As noted by one study, "Batlle was convinced that the Colorado Party "must recover its prestige" so that the country could enter an era that he characterized as "institutional truth, fruitful freedom, order and solid and enlightened progress." Faced with the lack of structure of the Colorado Party in 1903, the elected President of the Republic became its natural guide, since his influence was decisive for the appointments of candidates and Political Leaders; and Batlle used that power to promote numerous changes in the party organization."

== Political career ==
Batlle's political career began in 1887, when he was appointed as the jefe político of department of Minas. His appointment was short-lived, for he resigned after six months to seek election to the Chamber of Deputies as a candidate on the Colorado ticket. After a disagreement with then-president Máximo Tajes, however, Batlle lost his spot on the ticket. Following his departure to Minas, El Día stopped publishing, but Batlle reopened the paper in 1889 to support the campaign of Julio Herrera y Obes for the presidency, whose financial support helped Batlle reopen the paper. The new El Día sold at 2 cents a copy on the streets. As noted by one study, it was "the first street sale of newspapers in Uruguay, the first newspaper whose aim was mass readership." The presidency of Herrera y Obes disappointed Batlle however, with one study noting that

"Batlle had been working to reorganize the Colorado Party so that it could win real elections and name presidents. Herrera y Obes saw the party's role differently it should be the instrument of the president, not his superior; the power of the government, not the broad base of the party, would win the elections. When Herrera y Obes proceeded to name the Colorado candidates for the legislature, Batlle broke with the President. And when Idiarte Borda continued Herrera y Obes' political tactics and combined them with overt corruption, Batlle erupted in Colorado party meetings and in the press. The young grocery clerk who assassinated Borda in '97, during Saravia's revolution, had been inspired, he said, by the bitter articles against the President in opposition newspapers, but evil tongues insisted that Batlle's connection with the assassination was more direct than merely writing blistering press editorials."

Batlle turned his support to Juan Lindolfo Cuestas, whom Batlle saw as an opportunity to have free elections and remake the Colorado Party along the lines Batlle had long preached. Batlle would become President of the National executive Committee of the Colorado Party, or at least the pro-Cuestas faction of the party. He was eventually elected in 1891 as a deputy for the department of Salto, and quickly rose to further prominence within the Colorado party. Batlle started organizing Colorado party clubs based on "grass-roots" democratic assemblies, and towards the end of 1895 circumstances led to Batlle adopting a pro-labor attitude that he would hold for the rest of his life. Montevideo workers who sought to improve their wages and reduce their working hours (which were 15–19 hours daily) organized and went on strike. The government, made up of Batlle's own Colorado party, denounced the strikers as "rebellious workers" and brought all of its force to bear to break the strike The strikers were strongly supported by Batlle and El Día, where Batlle wrote "if this working day ought to be considered suicide for the workers, it is, on the part of the employer, an assassination." El Día started a permanent department called "The Working Man's Movement" as a forum for the employed classes. Batlle continued his ruminations through his years as a Colorado politician. On one occasion, while confiding some of his ruminations with Julio Herrera y Obes (while Batlle was still on good terms with him) the latter replied, astounded "Why, man, you're a socialist!" Similarly, Cuestas, who didn't trust Batlle entirely, described him as such "This citizen is a young man of 45, well educated, the son of the late President Batlle, a newspaperman by profession, a revolutionary political agitator, a very tall man with the muscles of a Roman gladiator. He is popular with the politically active elements of the younger generation. He is not accepted by conservative opinion."

Despite this, Cuestas did not veto Batlle's candidacy for the presidency as his government still needed the Colorado political support Batlle contributed. However, Cuestas had no intention of allowing Batlle to succeed him, instead wanting a successor who would continue his cardinal principles, strict economy and conciliation of the Nationalists. Cuestas had in mind his Minister of Government, Eduardo MacEachen, who was a substantial landowner and prominent member of the conservative classes. In the end, Batlle would go on to succeed Cuestas as president to put in place policies that tackled the numerous social issues facing Uruguay.

=== Senate ===
Batlle was elected as a senator for Montevideo Department in November 1898, and rapidly became President of the Senate of Uruguay. As the President of the Senate was (at the time) the first in line to the presidency, Batlle briefly served as the acting President of Uruguay while Juan Lindolfo Cuestas stepped aside to legitimate his de facto presidency in 1899. While President of the Senate Batlle was, according to one study, "second-ranking elective official in the country, until a coalition of conservative Colorados and Blancos expelled him from the post in 1900. He continued his organizational and ideological efforts within the party, with much success. In the 1903 election, he became the President of the Republic. The country's highest post allowed him nearly full control of public policy and the opportunity to forward his broad program of social and economic reform."

At elections in 1900, however, the Colorados performed poorly, and dissident Colorado senators elected Juan Carlos Blanco Fernández as President of the Senate by one vote. Batlle would later briefly regain the position of President of the Senate in February 1903 before becoming President of the Republic. The day before he was elected President of Uruguay, Batlle stated his program which, as noted by one observer, included “peaceful coexistence of for the two major political parties, social reforms for the average citizen, and modern public-administration methods for the government.”

=== First presidency (1903–07) ===
First Cabinet
Ministry	Officeholder	Duration
Minister of Government	Juan Campisteguy	1903–1904
Minister of Government	Claudio Williman	1904–1907
Minister of Foreign Relations	José Romeu	1903–1907
Minister of Finance	Martín C. Martínez	1903–1904
Minister of Finance	Eugenio J. Magdalena	1907
Minister of War	Eduardo Vázquez	1903–1907
Minister of Industry and Labour	Juan Alberto Capurro	1903–1907

==== Revolution of 1904 ====
In 1904 Batlle's government forces successfully ended the intermittent Uruguayan Civil War which had persisted for many years, when the opposing National Party leader Aparicio Saravia was killed at the battle of Masoller. Without their leader, Saravia's followers abandoned their fight, starting a period of relative peace.

After victory over the Blancos, Batlle introduced widespread political, social, and economic reforms, such as a welfare program, government participation in many facets of the economy, and a new constitution. Between 1904 and 1916, according one study, "the triumphant sector of the Colorado Party, Batllism, emphasized social programs and what the philosopher Carlos Vaz Ferreira (1915) denominated pobrismo (focus on poverty), constructing a state that was intended to be the "shield of the weak" (Perelli 1985)." According to one historian, Batlle ratified his war victory "with the electoral victory of 1905, which led his supporters to form a majority in the legislature and dominate the Colorado Party organization throughout the country. Once his position was secured, he was ready for reforms."

==== Social reforms ====
During Batlle y Ordóñez's term in office, secularization became a major political issue. Uruguay banned crucifixes in hospitals by 1906, and eliminated references to God and the Gospel in public oaths. Divorce laws were also established during this time. A number of other projects were approved during Batlle's first presidency, such as an increase in resources allocated to teaching, the contracting of a loan of for the construction and improvement of roads, free distribution of seeds and clothing to poor farmers, the permanent sale of seeds on behalf of the State, the creation of the Faculties of Veterinary Medicine and Agronomy, and the creation of colonies on expropriated estates in Paysandú. According to one study, the modifications introduced to the initial proposal made the expropriation impossible. In 1904 an Education Pension Fund established in 1896 was extended to include the administrative employees of the school system. That same year, a Civil Service Pension Fund was set up that was aimed at regularizing the civil-service pension system "while expanding both coverage and benefits." The Assembly modified the retirement and civil pension system in this way:

"Public employees who have more than 10 years of service and are unable to continue due to illness, disability or advanced age; employees who, after having served the same number of years, cease due to termination of employment or exoneration, not due to omission or crime; and those with more than 30 years of service and 60 years of age. The mother, the widow and the minor and unmarried children of public employees are entitled to a pension. The Fund is integrated with the help of a monthly fee of 6,000 pesos paid by the State, (doubled later), the monthly discount of one day's salary for employees (5% later) and other lesser taxes. The funds will be invested in public debt securities. Retirement will be as many thirty-thirds of the average salary that the employee has enjoyed in the last five years, as long as the years of service rendered. The pension in favor of the relatives of the employee, will be half of the retirement, Retirements and pensions can not be seized or disposed of."

In 1903, the executive branch had to "actively attend to the seed supply service in various agricultural regions of the country", which had punished by drought and the subsequent loss of crops. Stimulated by the first successes of the distribution, it authorized the Department of Livestock and Agriculture to establish a Seed Station on the fiscal lands of Toledo. A later year, the Assembly enacted a law "authorising the Executive Branch to allow the free importation of seeds for three years". The subsequent losses of agriculture gave rise "to the Public Powers intensifying their stimulating action" with a 1906 law authorizing the government to help abandoned farmers with food and seeds. A supplementary credit of 50,000 pesos was allocated for this purpose. In 1904, the Executive Power appointed a commission in charge of drawing up a protection plan for morally and materially destitute minors. In July 1903, a resolution was sent by Defense Minister Jose Serrato to the General directorate of Public Instruction, creating night courses for adults. In 1906, departmental high schools were created.

Batlle's time in office also saw the improvement of roads, the construction of bridges and ports, the navigation of some important interior rivers, the creation of the Veterinary and Agronomy Schools, the construction of school buildings worth $1,000, 000, the improvement of many services, the start of construction of the Pereira-Rossell Children's Hospital and the inauguration of the Military Hospital. In 1905, Batlle negotiated and obtained from the Assembly the abolition of 10% and 5% reductions on salaries of less than $360 a year. A decree established the Central Board of Aid, "under whose supervision the National Charity Commission acted, in the relief and hospitalization of the wounded and sick of the civil war of 1904." A law that authorized the introduction of electric traction in the trams of La Comercial had been vetoed by the Government of Battle's predecessor Cuestas in 1902 on the grounds that the traction systems were in their infancy and that the term of 75 years was excessively long. One of the first measures of Batlle's administration consisted in the withdrawal of that veto, and thanks to this the work began immediately. The Executive Power justified this decision by arguing that the change of traction was a progress that Montevideo demanded and that it would have "effective repercussions in the improvement of the housing of the working class, due to the ease with which he will be able to transpose daily the distances that separate the habitual center of occupations from the localities where land ownership can still be obtained relatively cheaply."

Sanitation works were also carried out, while yielding to the exhortation of the Executive Power, the Charity Commission granted the "Uruguayan League against Tuberculosis" a monthly subsidy of $2,000 which the same Executive Power obtained after it was raised to $3,000, invoking the importance of the work undertaken by the League. The Conversion and Public Works Loan Law passed in 1906 earmarked $1,000,000 for school construction. That amount was reinforced with $200,000 and later with $300,000 during Battle's second administration. The university curriculum was expanded, foreign professors and technicians were brought in, and scholarships for study in Europe and the United States were set up. University expansion also took place. A decree authorized a long-needed house-to-house property reassessment of Montevideo; "the decree required land to be evaluated separately from improvements." For the first time, army and police uniforms were required to be made from Uruguayan cloth, while the government also stipulated the piece rate paid the seamstresses who sewed the uniforms. Under a law of the 27th September 1906 the name of an enterprise was changed to Usina Eléctrica de Montevideo, "with exclusive privilege of selling electric light and power in Montevideo for twenty years." The Executive was given power to fix rates, while profits "after setting aside 15 per cent for reserves, were to go to the Junta Económico-Administrativa de Montevideo. The Act's original purpose had been to enable the Usina to meet power requirements, but the law was passed on the promise of lower lighting rates and better service on the insistence of the Cámara de Representantes."

Various developments in Public Assistance also took place during Batlle's first presidency. As noted by a 1905 presidential message

"In the past year, the National Charity Commission has had to attend, apart from the ordinary services entrusted to it by law, the numerous wounded and sick from the armed forces, and provide the mobilized corps and the organized expeditions with by the Central Aid Board, the healing elements and the necessary medicines. This extraordinary attention has not prevented, however, the continuation of the expansion and improvement plan begun in previous years, among them worthy of mention the completion and fitting out of the new women's department in the Asylum for Beggars and Chronic People; the expansion of the infirmary of the Asylum for Foundlings and Orphans; the inauguration of electric lighting in the Hospital; several sanitation works in the Isolation House and other works, although of less importance, all tending to improve the hygienic conditions of the Nursing Homes and Hospices. The National Commission has also cooperated with its revenues to support the Dispensaries of the Anti-Tuberculosis League and some departmental hospitals, and has contributed, by dispensing prescriptions free of charge, to the action of Home Public Assistance and various philanthropic societies."

In a 1906 presidential message, other developments in public charity, hygiene and health were noted:

"After having fulfilled the primary duty of rendering solicitous care to the sick wounded of the last conflict, the Government has devoted its attention to the improvement of this important branch, and hopes to obtain satisfactory results. During this period, the National Council of Hygiene sponsored the project of one of its members on the creation of establishments called 'Gota de Leche,' so beneficial to the health of children and to the education of mothers because it provides them with resources and knowledge to raise their children properly. This mission was entrusted to the National Commission of Charity and efforts will be made to complete it through a law that protects newborns and prevents their mothers from abandoning them when exercising the profession of wet nurses. By continuing to apply the current international sanitary agreement, said Council planned to establish a disinfection center in the port, and by accepting said project, the Government offered to provide a credit of $32,000 to be repaid. In addition, said Council was authorized to acquire a steamer equipped with the necessary apparatus for the maritime health service. It was proposed to create the post of terrestrial health inspector whose mission will be to travel to any point in the Republic where an epidemic develops in order to adopt the appropriate measures with due authority and competence. At present, a project to reform the organic law of the Council, the formation of the 'Codex medicamentarius' and several regulations that have to complete the health service are being studied. For the rest, the sanitary state of the Republic is excellent and the municipal authorities cooperate with the National Council of Hygiene to improve all this service and ensure that the ordinances are strictly applied and that a true zeal is shown in combating contagious diseases."

==== Proposals for labor reform ====
A progressive supporter of labor rights, Batlle also presided over a number of pro-labor policies. Batlle had identified his Colorado Party with labor, stating in April 1887, regarding a demonstration that was organized in Montevideo "It is true : in the Colorado Party, the element of the people predominates, the working classes." In a speech he made during his first presidency, Batlle described his Colorado Party as one that was concerned with peoples' well-being, stating that "I cannot accompany you in supporting the motto that you carry "Down with peace", because my duty as President of the Republic is to guarantee peace and harmony, because peace means advancement, progress, the well-being of the people, which is the true motto of the Colorado Party. I declare that if I had been brought to this position to provoke the war, I would not have accepted it; but I can guarantee that in this conflict, in which the Nation has been so unjustly involved, I will preserve by all legal means the Colorado Party's stay in power, which currently means the stability of the constitutional order, making an effort at the same time to avoid bloodshed, the ruin of national wealth and all the horrors that civil content brings, as an obligatory procession. It is not enough for the Party to have power, it is necessary to govern to do good, it is necessary to govern with honor for the same." One 1913 study reflected this view, stating that (in relation to the late Nineteenth Century) "In the proximity of the '73 elections, and as always, his first act was to formulate a concise exposition of ideas that honors our party annals. This was the obsessive concern of our party, to root more and more in the field of law, freedom and social justice."

During Batlle's first presidency regulations on police procedure during strikes were promulgated for the first time. Police had to remain neutral, protecting both the right to strike and the right to work. Also for the first time during Batlle's first presidency on May Day labor demonstrators were granted police permits to parade through the center of Montevideo. According to one study "They sang the Internationale and heard fiery speeches. One speaker exulted that Uruguay now led South America in modern ideas because of its President's liberalism." On another occasion during his first presidency, Batlle helped resolve a rail strike. This occurred after a union formed by railroad workers made a list of demands that the railroad rejected, including dismissal payments to men over 50 who were discharged, 2 days off with pay every month, wages of 80 pesos a month for locomotive engineers and 1 peso and 20 cents a day for manual laborers, and an 8-hour day 6 months a year and a 10-hour day the other 6 months. Claudio Williman, the railroad's former attorney, was sent by Batlle to offer himself as mediator. As noted by one study, the railroad "knew Batlle's pro-labor sympathies, verified by Williman's presence, and accepted most of the striker's demands, It drew a line at recognizing the union, but promised to take back the strike leaders in due time – a remarkable concession. The jubilant strikers returned to work."

Batlle also prepared a labor reform project aimed at improving working conditions, although legislative realities delayed the time in which he submitted this to the legislature for consideration. According to one study, "One reason why Chamber debate on divorce and kindred bills had been allowed to drag was the certainty that the Senate, as presently constituted, would not be disposed to their passage." Following senate elections in 1906, the Executive sent Batlle's labor project to the legislature. Explaining in a post-election interview why he had held the bill back for so long, Batlle stated that

"I have worked to prepare a plan of social reforms, all designed to look after and to liberate the working classes. But you must realize that up to now we have had a Senate composed of good patriots, but conservatives. The new Senate, on the other hand, will be entirely liberal and will not put obstacles in the way of the reforms. The workers already know that they will find protection in the government. I believe – in effect – that in countries like ours, where the problem of liberty is already resolved, it is necessary to begin to resolve social problems."

The project provided for an eight-hour limit "in the strenuous and intensive occupations and ten hours in the less exacting commercial occupations" while a one-year transition period was provided "during which an additional hour per day was permitted." It also provided for regulation of the labour of women and children, a weekly rest day, and prohibition of the labour of women for four weeks after child-birth "during which period the State would provide suitable financial support." The bill's main objective was the eight-hour day but despite having a workable majority in Congress "he was unable to persuade his party to accept this radical innovation." On 26 June 1911 a new labor bill was sent to Congress by Batlle which provided for an eight-hour day "without the intermediate period of one year established in his earlier bill and with broadened coverage," repeated provisions as to weekly rest and child labour, and increased the compulsory period of rest after child-birth to forty-five days. On 31 May 1913 the Chamber approved in general Batlle's project modified by its Labor Commission, with provisions on child labor and women's work left aside to include them in a separate project, as well as the day of rest. A Chamber Committee had left out these provisions to simplify passage and Batlle, according to one study, "to close off accusations of Godless crackpotism, acknowledged that the one-day-in-six provision was "an aspiration for the future," and agreed to the committee's procedures. The chamber leadership knew what Batlle wanted, and the Chamber voted down requests for delay for additional documentation." The Chamber voted 44 in favor and 8 against. As discussions in the House developed, several conservative Colorado legislators tried to reactivate a proposal to increase the working day by 3 hours through a contract, but that initiative was rejected. By voice vote, with the result being sufficiently close for Gregorio L. Rodríguez (the deputy who put forward the 3 hour overtime provision as an amendment) to call for a second vote, overtime was defeated. In the Senate, however, approval was hindered until the chambers were renewed on 17 November 1915, when the project was finally voted affirmatively.

==== New Colorado platforms ====
Various Colorado Party platforms were also drafted and/or adopted during Batlle's first presidency. In September 1905 the Colorado Executive Committee and the Colorado legislators entrusted Pedro Manini Rios (the leader of the young Colorados) to draft a pre-electoral manifesto that would serve as a party program. Manini summed up Colorado accomplishments in 40 years of power and outlined a 5-point program. This included constitutional reform, concern for labor, economic self-sufficiency, increase of rural population, and reduction of taxes on consumption. According to one study however, "None of the points proposed anything specific. For example, the labor plank invoked the standard consoling fiction "It is an exaggeration to present these problems in our society in the almost dreadful terms in which they are agitated ... in some European societies." In 1907 Jose Espalter was tasked with drawing up a party program that would include constitutional refor, separation of Church and State, municipal autonomy, and labor legislation. The program favored reduction of consumption taxes and the enacting of progressive taxation, not of the magnitude that would despoil private fortunes but rather "a limited and moderate progression, whose rate oscillates between certain limits." In addition, the State had a right to intervene in labor questions, but "It is a matter of elevated inspiration and exquisite tact." At the end of the Batlle's first government in February 1907, the National Convention of the Colorado Party met and formulated a declaration of principles. These were "Reform of the Constitution; universal suffrage, that is, authorization to vote in favor of all citizens; election of the President of the Republic directly by the people; proportional representation of the parties; autonomous municipalities; the rights of assembly and association are not expressly enshrined in the Constitution and that gap must be filled; separation: of Church and State; easy naturalization of foreigners; decrease in consumption taxes, establishing instead a progressive tax; solution of problems related to capital and labor, within the limits of justice, law and freedom."

==== Activities following the first presidency ====
Following the end of his first presidency, Batlle went on an extended tour of Europe and other foreign parts. One of Batlle's main purposes was to study Europe's political and economic problems. He also headed the Uruguayan delegation to the Second Hague Conference, where he proposed a plan for a society of nations to maintain peace. After the conference adjourned Batlle visited Switzerland; becoming familiar with the contributions that country made to the science of government. By December 1909, agitation was begun by the Colorado Party to make him their candidate in 1911. A small conservative anti-Batlle sentiment within the Colorado Party "was lost in a growing tide of enthusiasm for a renomination." On July the 3rd 1910 Batlle's candidacy was unanimously proclaimed by the party's national committee. Batlle stated in a letter to the party's committee while he was in Europe the kind of platform he could stand for. Apart from his reiterated advocacy of an eight-hour day, Batlle "took a stand for popular instead of legislative election of the national president; for proportional representation of parties in the congress; for assurance of such workers' rights as those to life, health, and culture; for full protection of children, women, the ill, and the aged; for free and assisted immigration; for free public instruction in all its levels and obligatory education at the elementary level; for assistance to stock raising and agriculture and the stimulation of national industry; for the organization by the state of all services social interest." According to one study, "Truly it was a broad platform, hewn to a political design far in advance of its time."

=== Second presidency (1911–15) ===
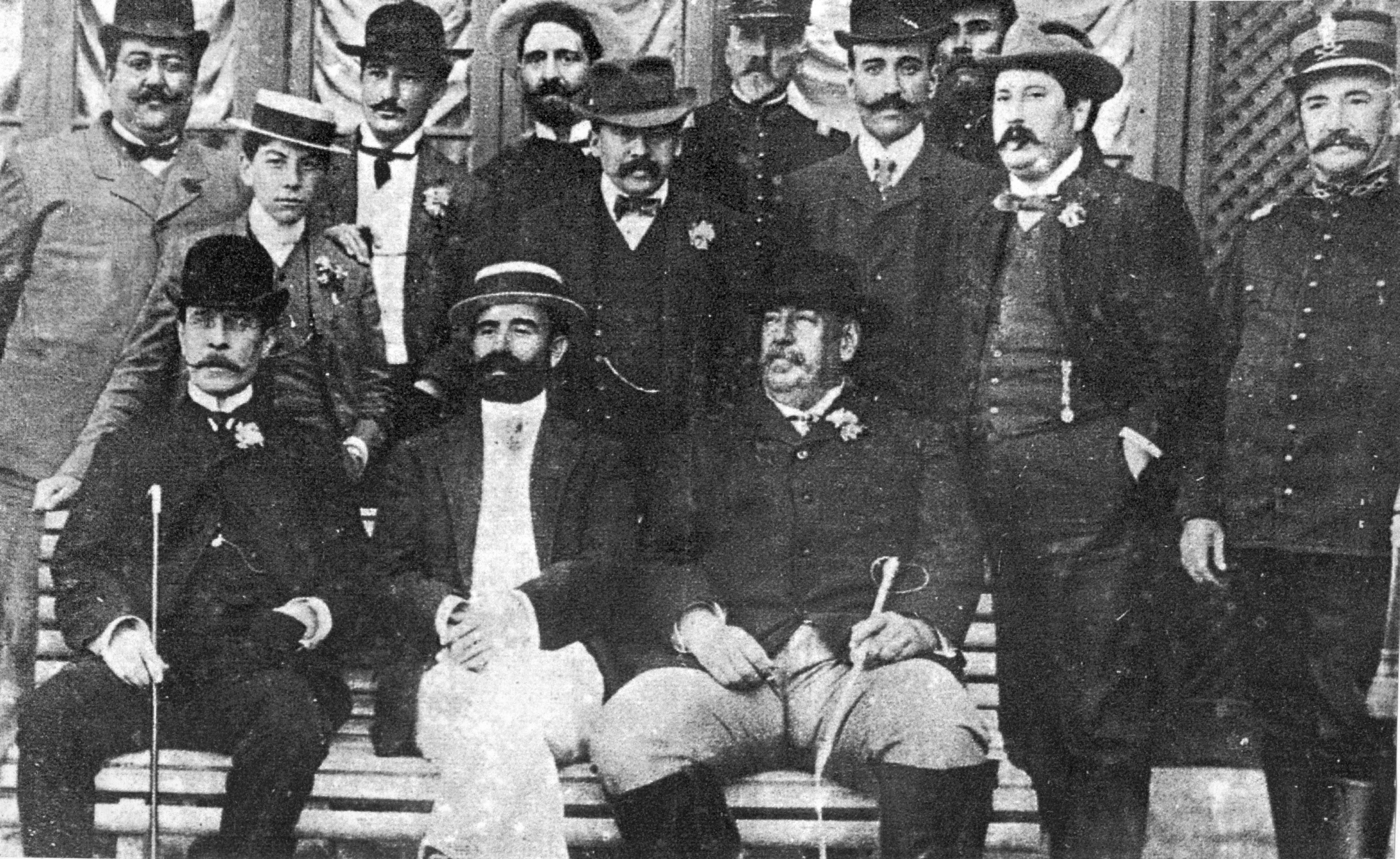
Batlle with other prominent politicians at the beginning of his second presidency in 1911. Standing (left to right): Feliciano Viera, Pedro Manini Ríos, Mateo Margariños Solsona, Antonio M. Rodríguez, Colonel Laborde, José Serrato y Domingo Arena. Seated: Claudio Williman, Diego Pons and José Batlle y Ordoñez

In 1913, influenced by visiting and studying French and Swiss politics between his first and second terms, Batlle proposed a reorganization of the government which would replace the presidency with a nine-member National Council of Administration, similar to the Swiss Federal Council. Batlle's proposal for a collective leadership body was defeated in 1916 referendum, but he managed to establish a model in which executive powers were split between the presidency and the National Council of Administration when a variant of his proposal was implemented with the Constitution of 1918.

Further reforms were carried out during Batlle's second presidency. As noted by one study, following the swearing in of Batlle's ministers, "that "rain" of projects which so disturbed conservative opinion during Batlle's first administration again began to fall." A few days after Batlle assumed the presidency, Ramón V. Benzano (the newly appointed Mayor of Montevideo) "ordered the Department of Public Health to inspect all the tenements, most of which, according to a 1906 survey, lacked light and air and space, and close those that were not improved within a year." A special labor division of the Montevideo police set up under Claudio Williman was abolished, and Batlle announced that he would reintroduce his bill providing for an 8-hour day. In order to prepare materials for the study of the labor problems, the Executive Power resolved in 1913 that the Labor Office would include a number of topics in its program such as Cost of living in relation to wages, Offer and job demand, Labor census, Situation of the worker element, Labor legislation, and Organization of employers and workers. On 17 May 1912 a law was approved providing for the creation of the Women's Section of Secondary Education. Expansion and dissemination of physical education also took place, with a National Commission of Physical Education set up and sports places in Montevideo and in the interior established. Industrial education was expanded while free secondary and university education was introduced and departmental high schools created in the interior while a female section of secondary education was established, which managed to get many girls to go to high school.

Under a law of 21 July 1914 industrial employers, including those in state and municipal establishments, "were required to install safety devices to prevent accidents in the use of machinery." The law required that "dangerous machinery should be inspected, if necessary; that steam engines, wheels, and turbines be accessible only to their operators; that women and children should not be employed in the cleaning or repair of machinery in motion; that gears be shielded; that masons and painters working at a height of more than 3 metres be protected by a rail 90 centimetres on each side, etc." A 1914 law on severance pay, which referred to commercial employees, introduced two months' notice before dismissal together with compensation proportional to the years of work that the worker had in his job.

Foreign professors were hired to establish new university schools such as agronomy and veterinary medicine, agricultural and home economics courses were established for rural youth, and study missions were sent abroad. In regards to salary discounts, The Executive Branch addressed the Assembly requesting that the discount suffered by Passive Classes in general be reduced to 10%. The measure came to favor 3,739 people. The Assembly also completely abolished the 19% tax on assignments and salaries that did not exceed $660 per year and reduced that of the largest to 10%. Another law more effectively protected retirees and school pensioners. A network of popular libraries was set up, and the capital of the Bank of the Republic, which issued currency and directly loaned money to the public, was substantially increased, while a series of economic-development institutes in fishing, geological drilling, industrial chemistry, agriculture and ranching were set up. A bill that was converted into law and put into execution authorized an issue of Public Debt for the amount of $500,000 "for the purchase or expropriation of land that would be divided into farms and resold on the basis of combinations with the Mortgage Bank of Uruguay." These colonization centers would be set up "in the most appropriate places due to the unnatural nature of the land, its proximity to the roads of communication and transportation facilities to the centers of consumption, for which 'the necessary facilities of the railways would be opportunely managed, and around the Agronomic Stations, as a means of taking advantage of the progressive impulse of the high agricultural education and the suggestive example of the experimental farms." Under an Act of January the 19th 1912 a rural credit section was established within the Bank of the Republic and the formation of local rural credit banks was authorized. By the law of 11 January 1912 the effects of a provision of 1906 that authorized the Executive to import cereal seeds for resale at cost price, free of customs duties, were extended. The Bank of the Republic was also nationalized, with previous laws paving the way for this. As noted by one study "The laws of July 1907 and 17 November 1908 – sanctioned by Batllist chambers – prepared the nationalization of the Bank." Under the law of 17 July 1907, as noted by one study, "$1,000,000 was transferred from the national treasury surplus to increase the capital of the Bank and by the law of 17 November 1908 it was provided that whenever the public revenues exceeded expenditures the dividends on the Bank shares held by the government were to be utilized automatically to acquire the second series of shares originally destined for public distribution." Batlle also expropriated private lands adjacent to a beachfront called the Parque Urbano for a "great maritime promenade" that the poor could access easily, and received legislative approval for a substantial outlay of 3,000,000 pesos together with approval for expansion of Montevideo's traditional promenade, the Prado.

In 1912 the government purchased control of the National Mortgage Bank "and proceeded to liberalize the bank's loan policies. More attention was given to small loans and loans on rural property." Ownership of small farms was encouraged, with the bank purchasing large tracts of land and selling them to settlers in parcels usually 60 acres or less, and purchasers of such parcels were granted a tax exemption of 10 years. According to a 1956 study, since the time the Mortgage Bank was converted from a private to a government-owned and –operated status, "it has been active, though by no means monopolistic, in mortgage financing both in urban and rural areas." A State Insurance Bank was opened in 1912 which assumed a prominent role in the fields of fire and workmen's compensation. As noted by one study, Batlle sought to centralize insurance services "through a state monopoly to lower rates and increase public confidence." Under the State Insurance Bank, insurance was provided for risks such as death, labor accidents, fires, and hail. One defender of the state insurance bill, José Serrato, sought to educate public opinion (which Serrato described as "generally conservative in this country") by refuting ideas that this project marked the start of "communism or collectivism:"

"If by socialism one means the improvement of the working class, the raising of their culture, their means of existence and their human dignity, if one also means a more rational distribution of wealth, if by socialism one means the defense and well being of that great economic factor called man – without which there can be no progress – then this project is clearly socialist; but if by socialism, or immediate socialist goals, one means the disappearance of private property, if by socialism one means the appropriation of all the means of production, I say that this bill is not based on the ideas of that school."

The State Insurance Bank was established on 11 January 1912, and started operations in Fire insurance on 1 March, in workmen's compensation 15 March, and in hail, human life, pedigreed-animal life, marine, glass, and automobile civic responsibility insurance later that year. In 1914 it initiated a campaign to promote old age provision among the poorer classes. As noted by one study, this type of insurance, known as Seguro popular, "was offered without medical examination and without rigid requirements for payment of premium. The poor man was enabled 'to substitute an insurance policy for a savings bank account.' With an ordinary policy he might lose by being unable to continue paying premiums due to loss of his job, but with seguro popular he could deposit money whenever he wished; in the event of becoming incapacitated he withdrew the full amount of his contributions plus 6 percent interest; if he died before the date of policy payment his savings would go to his heirs; if he lived to old age he had a permanent income." A law of 10 November 1916 "provided that capital payments up to $5,000 and income up to $1,200 annually derived from seguro popular could not be attached." However, "Seguro popular (really a deferred annuity with special clauses) failed to gain favour with the public and in 1936 there were less than 200 policies of that type outstanding."

Commenting on the approval of the State Insurance Bank, one historian has noted that the "Senate, like the Chamber, was all-Colorado and a cozy Batllista club. In a single session the State Insurance Bank was approved in both readings."

Other highlights of Batlle's reform program in 1912 included the division of the country into new military zones, creation of an institute of industrial chemistry, the promulgation of a law making the supply of electric light and power a country-wide state monopoly, a bill for suppressing bullfights, decreeing of a law of literary and artistic copyright, approval of an urbanization plan for the city of Montevideo, and the issuance of regulations for a school of nursing. Under a law of 21 October 1912, the State was given, through the Usinas Eléctricas del Estado, "a monopoly of the supply of electric light and power throughout the country." Labour benefited from this decision, with the first budget of Usinas Eléctricas providing for a general increase in wages "which was intended to bring the wage scale up to that of other public utilities and to offset the rising cost of living."

A law of January 1913 authorized the issuance of a loan of 500,000 pesos destined for the purchase and division of land. With the promulgation of the law of 22 January 1913, the State began its direct action "which acquires or expropriates lands to sell them based on the mortgage credit to the settlers. In doing so, it seeks, undoubtedly, to eliminate by competition the colonizing companies that had little or no regard for the interests of the colonists, and that for the same reason — and especially due to the peremptory terms for repayment of the loan — led to failure to most colonizing attempts." The aforementioned law authorized the P.E. to issue a colonization loan worth 500,000 pesos, for "purchase and subdivision of land for agricultural colonization." (art.2) The lots "will be sold in cash or for a term of up to thirty years with a mortgage guarantee, which the P.E. can transfer to the Mortgage Bank by issuing bonds (art.3)." The same Power is also authorized to expropriate the necessary lands "for which purpose it is already declared of public utility" (art. 4), and said lands "shall be free from the payment of Real Estate Tax for a term of ten years and from executions and embargoes originating from debts contracted by the settlers before and during the first five years, except for mortgages." Also, to avoid the concentration of land, it is indicated that "no settler may buy more than one farm". On 6 February 1915, by decree of the P.E., "it was a matter of promoting colonization in a certain specialized sense; In effect, the Colonization Advisory Commission is authorized to buy land for forestry, granting properties with payment facilities to whoever commits to carry out forest plantations in a third of its surface."

Various improvements were carried out to a number of hospitals during Batlle's second presidency while a Permanent Assistance medical service was inaugurated on March the 1st 1913, with (as noted in a presidential message by Batlle) "its true importance could be appreciated, proving its undeniable usefulness, to the point that there has already been a need to expand the elements it has, in order to respond, if not in a complete way, at least very effective, to the needs of the population. The number of emergency assistance, 11,600, in just ten months of operation, is the most eloquent demonstration of the usefulness that the new service provides."

In 1913, in an attempt to prevent future Presidential dictatorships, Batlle proposed a collective Presidency (colegiado) based on the Swiss Federal Council model. This was offered as a way to prevent presidential dictatorship (in a nation where every person older than 13 had lived under a dictator) while also, as Batlle believed, as one study noted, assuring continuing reform "because the Colorado Party, with its ongoing action program, would control the Colegiado for some years, unlike the present arrangement in which every incoming president was free to reverse or ignore his predecessor's policies." The Colegiado proposal, however, was not welcomed by several politicians. Cabinet ministers resigned, and the majority of the Senate (despite consisting of men personally chosen by Batlle) announced that it would not bring up for debate the legislation that would enable a Constitutional Convention. An unforeseen gold crisis also struck Uruguay. As one study summed up this depressing situation: "Financing businesses became difficult; financing new government projects became impossible. The Bank of the Republic's gold holdings dropped below its charter requirements, and it stopped granting credit. Business was depressed, international trade decreased, government revenues dropped, and the budget surplus became a budget deficit. Workers' wages kept falling, and unemployment rose. Only ranchers, whose meat, wool, and hide exports were bringing first good, and then astronomical, prices were prospering, but they were holding on to their money in these troubled times." Nevertheless, Batlle resisted economic retrenchment and quickly responded to the political crisis. He chose a new cabinet from the young and obscure members of the Colorado Party, men who were committed Colegialists. In an election held on 30 November 1914, the mainstream of the Colorados, the Colegialists, gained 60% of the votes cast, and would have 68 seats in the Chamber of Deputies as opposed to the Nationalists' 21, while the Anticolegialists did not win a single seat.

However, the colegiado proposal was defeated in a 1916 referendum, but Batlle then managed to get support from the Blancos and the Second Constitution was approved by referendum on 25 November 1917.

Batlle kept a handwritten list of how the Senators stood on the linked issues of the eight-hour day and the Colegiado . On the eight – hour day there were "12 in favour, one doubtful and nothing beside the other five." Support for the Colegiado was less certain, with "7 in favour, 5 against, 6 blank."

According to one study, Batlle's fight for the collegiate executive "had overshadowed all else during the closing years of his greatest activity, but Batlle still found time to direct the negotiation of a number of arbitration treaties, to initiate a state-owned railway system, to sponsor a law providing equality of rights between legitimate and natural children, and to prepare a bill establishing pensions for the aged." In regards to the pensions proposal, El Día was confident of its passage, noting in an article dated 31 January 1916

"The discussion of the old-age pensions project, recommended by the P.E., will continue tomorrow in the Chamber of Deputies. The colorado majority is willing to sanction it as soon as possible, without admitting delays that would hurt too much those who have begun to base hopes for a better situation on the sanction of that project."

The same article also noted that

"The observation of the same Nationalist representative that they do not have the necessary data to sanction the project lacks solid foundation. It's true, the last census is from 1908. But that's enough. What you need to know is not precisely the number of elderly people and taxpayers in the country. It is the numerical relationship in which they are each other. And this relationship is given as well by the 1908 census as a new one could. On the other hand, if it were necessary to wait for another census to be taken to decree pensions, it can be assured that the project would be postponed for many years.

No! The Colorado majorities of the House and Senate allow these beneficent ideas to be carried out and there is no need to stop. All the men in the situation have made them, with beautiful unanimity, their program of principles, which they will not fail to carry out."

Batlle's constitutional reform proposals spilt the Colorado Party; a dissident wing called the Riverista Colorados (named after party founder Fructuoso Rivera), according one study, "went off the range on the issue of the collegiate or plural executive." They were led by Pedro Manini Rios, a Colorado who used to be close to Batlle; even drafting a law message of 8 hours and weekly rest in 1911, but broke with him. Manini asked rhetorically in 1913

"Are we socialists or are we Colorados? And let's give ourselves the clear, categorical and definitive answer. The Colorado Party in its capacity as liberal, advanced and evolutionary shares several points of the minimum socialist program, from all the secular solutions to almost all the postulates of legal improvement for the working class; but in its capacity as a party of government, order and institutional defense, it cannot share, it does not share, the purposes of social revolution that animate all socialists."

Manini even voted against the 8-hour law, despite the fact that the initial project for this measure bore his signature. However, although a more conservatively inclined group, the Riveristas called for a number of progressive policies similar to those proposed by Batlle. These included "political rights and civil equality for women; the status of the public official; the Labor Code, with regulations on the work of women and minors; workers' insurance for disability; hygiene and safety in workshops; work accident insurance; measures for forced unemployment; conciliation and arbitration, as a solution to the strike; economical and hygienic rooms for urban and rural workers; improvement and development of assistance; vocational technical schools; construction of urban and rural schools, improvement of salaries and guarantees in the appointments and promotions of teaching personnel; compulsory physical education, free vocational education courses, popular libraries; reform of the tax system, deducting essential items; promotion of industries derived from the use of the country's raw material, promotion of public works and improvement of means of transportation." On one occasion, as documented by one observer, Batlle himself said (according to La Mañana (Uruguay)) that "the Riverist Party had become imbibed with the spirit of Batllism, and stressed that Riverists and Batllists had the same party traditions, and that the Riverist Party was by no means as conservative as the traditional antagonists of the Colorados, the Nationalists."

Other Colorado factions emerged in later years, such as Vierismo and Sosismo, both of which presented themselves as politically progressive. Sosismo identified itself with the defense of workers' rights while "emphasizing the need for a Colorado agreement to overcome internal divisions and thus avoid the triumph of the Blancos." Vierismo characterized the National Party "as a conservative, retrograde, anti-democratic, anti-liberal group, and opposed to foreigners, to social-labour rights, to workers and to the humble classes." As a manifesto of Vierismo dated the 31 December 1919 declared, "No seromos conservadores, sino liberales, porque somos colorados, pero no somos tampoco socialistas (We will not be conservatives, but liberals, because we are colorados, but we are not socialists)."

Second Cabinet
Ministry	Officeholder	Duration
Minister for the Interior	Pedro Manini Ríos	1911–1912
Minister for the Interior	José Serrato	1912–1913
Minister for the Interior	Feliciano Viera	1913–1915
Minister of Foreign Relations	José Romeu	1911–1913
Minister of Foreign Relations	Emilio Barbaroux	1913–1915
Minister of Finance	José Serrato	1911–1913
Minister of Finance	Pedro Cosio	1913–1915
Minister of War and Navy	Juan Bernassa y Jerez	1911–1915
Minister for Public Education	Juan Blengio Rocca	1911–1913
Minister for Public Education	Baltasar Brum	1913–1915
Minister for Public Works	Víctor Sudriers	1911–1915
Minister of Industry and Labour	Eduardo Acevedo Vásquez	1911–1913
Minister of Industry and Labour	José Ramasso	1913–1915

=== First presidency of the National Council of Administration (1921–1923) ===
At the 1920 Uruguayan general election, Batlle was elected to his first term on the National Council of Administration. He subsequently served as its president for a two-year term from 1 March 1921 to 1 March 1923 alongside president Baltasar Brum.

During the presidency of Baltasar Brum, a project was presented by Batlle to the Batllista caucus and by it to the Legislative Body, which established that two-thirds of the profits of the State industrial companies, whose services were mainly provided by workers, would be used to raise the salaries and wages of workers and employees "up to double at least the average of private services." Although it triumphed in the Chamber of Deputies, it was rejected by the Senate.

=== Second presidency of the National Council of Administration (1927–1928) ===
At the 1926 Uruguayan general election, Batlle was elected to a new term on the National Council of Administration. He served again as its president from 1 March 1927 for just under one year, alongside new president Juan Campisteguy, until he was succeeded by Luis C. Caviglia on 16 February 1928.

=== Economic developments ===
The economy did well for much of Batlle's tenure. The peace following the end of the 1904 war, as noted by one study, "encouraged ranchers, who formed the base of the country's economy, to buy breeding stock to make up for their war losses and to buy or rent more land to pasture their livestock." The nation's businesses started to invest in foreign companies to build miles of new railroad lines and to electrify the trolley lines in Montevideo. In his last annual message Batlle argued that:

"It can be stated without hyperbole that our country has never enjoyed a prosperity superior to the present one or more complete civil and political liberty, from the time it was organized constitutionally. The national energies have been developing with increasing vigor in all economic fields, and for its part the Government has put all its zeal for the public interest into intelligently aiding the progress of the nation. Public works have received a considerable impulse; higher education is moving toward new and fruitful orientations which will widen our general culture and make our principle industries, ranching and agriculture, more scientific. Government income has increased in unprecedented fashion, permitting us to end the financial period with a budget surplus which by itself says more in honor of the Administration than any propaganda could."

Government intervention in the economy also increased during Batlle's time in office. Montevideo's electric power plant was nationalized, a move Batlle justified in the context of his "interest in the widest diffusion and distribution of all classes of services that are presently considered necessary for the general welfare, comfort, and hygiene." As one study noted, Batlle intended the power plant "to be only the first of a set of state enterprises that would provide low-cost services, simultaneously saving the public money and keeping Uruguayan capital from being shipped abroad as profits by foreign companies operating in the country." In 1911, the administration nationalized BROU, a savings and loan institution that monopolized the printing of money, while also establishing industrial institutes for geology and drilling (coal and hydrocarbon explorations), industrial chemistry, and fisheries. In 1914, the administration purchased the North Tramway and Railway Company, which later became the State Railways Administration of Uruguay. In agriculture, a number of government institutes were established "dedicated to technological research and development in the fields of livestock raising, dairying, horticulture, forestation, seeds, and fodder". A protectionist policy for industry was also pursued, with the government imposing, as noted by one study, "tariffs on foreign products, favoring machinery and raw materials imports, and granting exclusive licensing privileges to those who started a new industry". Indigenous companies also emerged, although foreign capital (especially from Britain and the United States), as noted by one study, "also took advantage of the legislation and came to control the meat industry. The growth of the frigorífico meat-processing industry also stimulated the interbreeding of livestock, Uruguay's main source of wealth."

These measures reflected Batlle's belief that the state had a part to play in economic affairs, as he noted in a 1911 when urging the legislature to create government monopolies: "Modern conditions have increased the number of industries that fall under the heading of public services ... competition has ceased to mean something invariably beneficial, monopoly is not necessarily condemnable ... The modern state unhesitatingly accepts its status as an economic organization. It will enter industry when competition is not practicable, when control by private interests vests in them authority inconsistent with the welfare of the State, when a fiscal monopoly may serve as a great source of income to meet urgent tax problems, when the continued export of national wealth is considered undesirable."

=== Electoral developments ===
Both the Batllista wing of the Colorado Party and the Colorado Party performed well during Batlle's presidencies, a trend that would continue in subsequent years. In the legislative election that Batlle called for in January 1905, his hand-picked candidates won the majority of seats. According to one study, "It was the first election in thirty years in which the outcome was not predetermined." In the 1905 elections for the House of Diputados, Batlle's sector the Batllistas won 57.7% of the vote. In subsequent elections for the House of Diputados and the Constituency Assembly the Batllistas continued to perform well, winning 64.2% of the vote in 1907, 79.9% of the vote in 1910, 60% of the vote in 1913, 45.2% of the vote in 1916, 49.3% of the vote in 1917, 29.5% of the vote in 1919, and 52.2% of the vote in 1920. Also, in the elections of 1905, 1907 and 1913, in nineteen departments Batllismo won in seventeen. According to one observer "Batllismo, from 1911 to 1915, was all-powerful, dominated absolutely in the Chamber of Deputies, it had some reservations in the Senate. There was not a single nationalist representative in the Senate at that time." As noted by one study, "Until 1917, Batllismo dominated the successive elections and obtained its best result in 1910 with 79.9% of the votes." As noted by another study, "The institutional difficulty resulting from the complex reading of the results was apparently not immediately perceived by contemporaries, but it came to the forefront when in January 1917 the legislative elections held according to the traditional rule of public vote gave Batlle back control of both chambers." One study has noted that 1917 "Batllismo had the majority in the chambers that it lacked in the Constituent Assembly."

== Later life ==
In early 1920 Batlle killed Washington Beltrán Barbat, a National Party deputy, in a formal duel that stemmed from vitriolic editorials published in Batlle's El Día newspaper and Beltrán's El País. His son Washington Beltrán would become President of Uruguay. He also served twice as Chairman of the National Council of Administration (1921–1923, 1927–1928).

After suffering abdominal pain for some time, Battle admitted himself to the Italian Hospital of Montevideo on 18 September 1929 for the first of two planned operations. While Batlle had made somewhat of a recovery a month later (with the second operation planned for another two or three months later), he had suffered some setbacks. Around midday on 20 October, Battle suffered the first of two thromboembolisms, with the second one later that afternoon proving fatal in Uruguay.

== Legacy ==
Probably in no other country in the world in the past two centuries has any one man so deeply left his imprint upon the life and character of a country as has José Batlle y Ordóñez upon Uruguay.

— Russell H. Fitzgibbon, Uruguay: Portrait of a Democracy, page 122

Batlle is commonly explained as being "ahead of his times." He was more than ahead of his times. Batlle created his times. His success reminds us that a man's ideals can lead other men.

— Milton I. Vanger, José Batlle y Ordoñez of Uruguay: The Creator of His Times 1902–1907, page 274

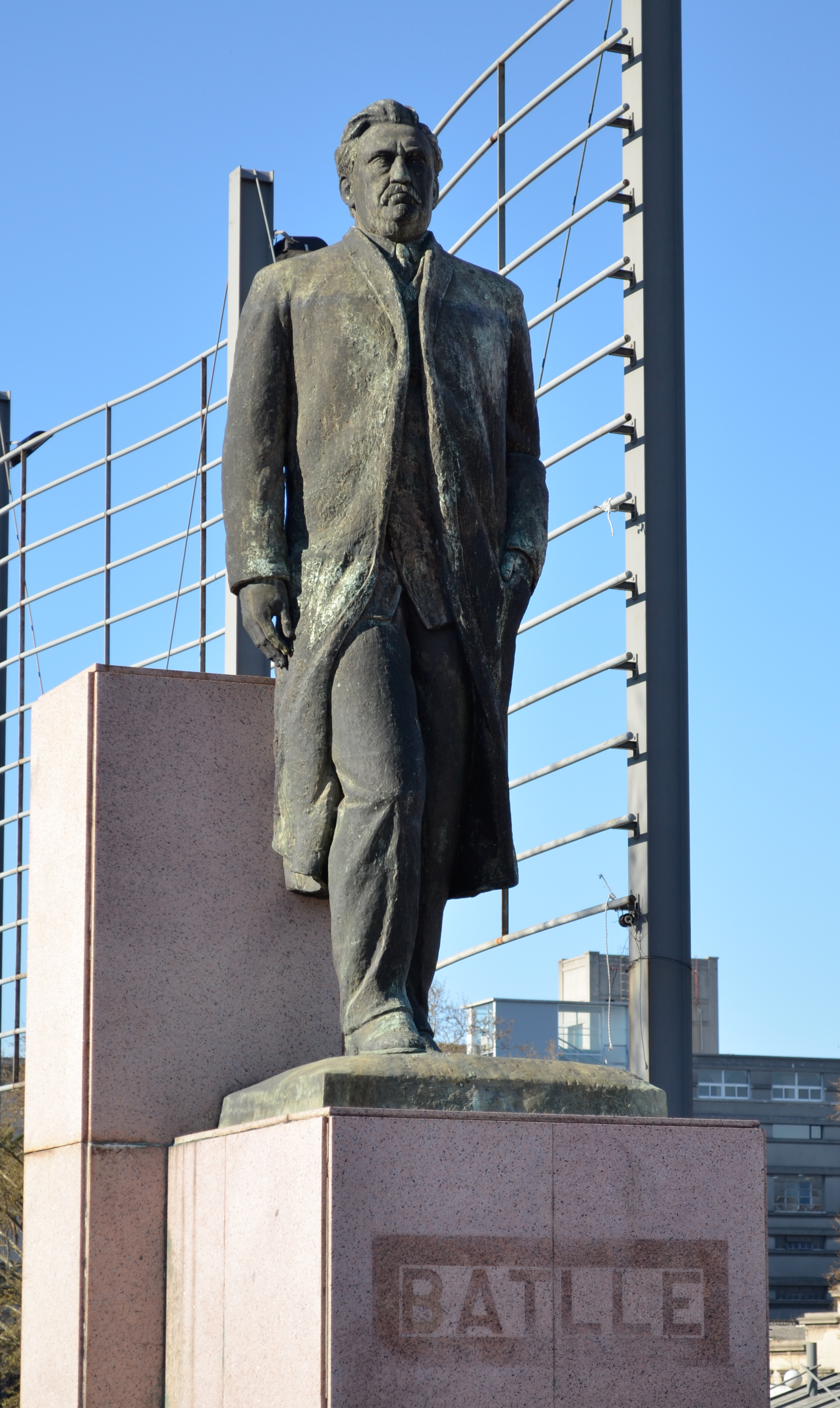
Monument of Batlle in Montevideo

The first implementation of the colegiado system which Batlle had championed, the National Council of Administration, was overthrown in a coup by president Gabriel Terra in 1933 and abolished by the third Constitution of Uruguay in 1934, a little over four years after Batlle's death. The idea of the colegiado system remained influential, however, and was reintroduced with the 1952 Constitution of Uruguay in the form of the National Council of Government. The National Council of Government fully abolished the presidency, making it closer to Batlle's desired system, but was itself abolished for a second time and the presidency re-established by the 1967 constitution.

In addition to his reforms, Batlle also succeeded in moving his Colorado Party in a more progressive direction, with one study arguing that

"The revitalization of the Colorado party was one of the early accomplishments of the great Batlle y Ordóñez. Sterility, a creeping cynicism, the incubus of the military dictatorships of recent years, all combined to put the Colorado party in almost as unenviable a position as that occupied by the Blancos. Batlle sold his party on its need for idealism and a program of reform, on the importance of intra-party democracy, discipline, and cohesiveness. The Colorado program, as Batlle thus evolved it, might have been a Latin archetype for the pattern of the New Deal in the United States a generation later."

According to one study,

"During the first quarter of the twentieth century mass democracy did not exist in Uruguay. The rise of José Batille y Ordoñez to the presidency in 1903 and 1911 was due largely to palace intrigue-similar to the political form Gino Germani typified as restricted democracy of notables. The parliament was made up of the old aristocracy, while during the first part of Batlle's second presidency, when the bulk of the interventionist social assistance state appeared, it was dominated by his friends."

According to one source, Batlle was responsible "for directing the liberal, democratic-independence institutional reform of the Eastern Republic of Uruguay, which placed her at the head of progressive and justice achievements; and gave him great fame in the American concert."

The reforms introduced under Batlle, and continued by several of his followers, would help make Uruguay a fairer society. Throughout his life, Batlle expressed his opposition to social injustices in society. On one occasion, he declared: "There is great injustice in the enormous gap between the rich and the poor." In 1917, he argued: "Our population may be divided into those who have received more than they deserve and those who have received less ... But this does not mean that a man is either exploited or an exploiter. The inequality is not deliberate on the part of the most fortunate." That same year, he argued: "The gap must be narrowed-and it is the duty of the State to attempt that task." Batlle believed in the power of the state to reduce inequalities, stating on another occasion: "Modern industry must not be allowed to destroy human beings. The State must regulate it to make more happy the life of the masses."

A public park and a neighborhood in Montevideo are named after him.

There is also a town in Lavalleja Department named after him.

== See also ==
- List of political families

== Bibliography ==
- Acevedo, Eduardo (1936). Anales de la Universidad Entrega N.° 138.
- Acevedo, Eduardo (1936). Anales históricos del uruguay tomo VI, Abarca los gobiernos de Viera, Brum, Serrato y Campisteguy, desde 1915 hasta 1930. Vol. VI. Montevideo: Casa A. Barreiro y Ramos.
- Alfaro, Milita; Bai, Carlos (19 November 1986). "5 Batlle, El Reformismo y sus limites (1903–1933)". Bases de la historia Uruguaya.
- Altman, David (2008). "Collegiate Executives and Direct Democracy in Switzerland and Uruguay: Similar Institutions, Opposite Political Goals, Distinct Results". Swiss Political Science Review. 14 (3): 483–520. doi:10.1002/j.1662-6370.2008.tb00110.x. hdl:10533/142630.
- Anales de la Universidad Entrega N.° 125. 1929.
- Angione, Ana María, ed. (1987). Dos décadas en la historia de la escuela uruguaya: el testimonio de los protagonistas.
- Ardao, Arturo (1951). Batlle y Ordóñez y el Positivismo Filosófico (PDF) (in Spanish). Montevideo: Número. OCLC 1025196424.
- Antuña, José Gervasio (1913). La junta de gobierno y el Partido Colorado. Montevideo Bertani.
- Barrán, José Pedro; Nahum, Benjamín (1983). Las primeras reformas, 1911–1913. Montevideo: Ediciones de la Banda Oriental.
- Barrán, José P.; Nahum, Benjamín (1979) [1979–1987]. Batlle, los Estancieros y el Imperio Británico (in Spanish). Vol. 3–6. Montevideo: Ediciones de la Banda Oriental.
- "Bases 10: Los partidos tradicionales en el siglo XX" [Background 10: The traditional parties of the 20th century]. Bases de la historia uruguaya. 6 May 1987.
- Batlle y Ordoñez, José (15 February 1914). Mensaje del presidente José Batlle y Ordoñez a la H. Asamblea General al inaugurarse el 1ª periodo de la XXV legislatura (Report).
- Batlle y Ordoñez, José (15 February 1905). Mensaje del presidente de la República ciudadano D. José Batlle y Ordoñez a la H. Asamblea General al inaugurarse el 1ª periodo de la XXII legislatura (Report).
- Batlle Beres, Luis (1931). Batllismo y el problems de los combustibles (in Spanish). Montevideo: Imprenta Nacional Colorada. OCLC 9542323.
- Caetano, Gerardo (1992). La república conservadora, 1916–1929: La "guerra de posiciones".
- Cassina de Nogara, Alba G. (1990). Hacia una democracia integral apuntes para una historia del feminismo en Uruguay. Consejo Nacional de Mujeres de Uruguay.
- Coletta, Michela (2018). Decadent Modernity: Civilisation and 'Latinidad' in Spanish America, 1880–1920. Liverpool Latin American Studies. Liverpool University Press. doi:10.3828/liverpool/9781786941312.001.0001. ISBN 9781786941312. JSTOR j.ctv8xnfs1.
- Da Silveira, Pablo; Monreal, Susana (2003). Liberalismo y jacobinismo en el Uruguay batllista: la polémica enter José E. Rodó y Pedro Díaz. Ciencas sociales (in Spanish). Montevideo: Taurus. ISBN 9789974671805.
- "En la convencion". El Día. 27 February 1907.
- "El Gobierno de un Periodista". El Día. 27 November 1906.
- "El Comite Ejecutivo Nacional Provisorio y Los Legisladores Colorados a sus Correlionarios". El Día. 23 September 1905.
- Demasi, Carlos (2004). La lucha por el pasado historia y nación en Uruguay (1920–1930).
- Dierksmeier, Claus (2019). Qualitative Freedom – Autonomy in Cosmopolitan Responsibility. Translated by Fincham, Richard. Springer, Cham. doi:10.1007/978-3-030-04723-8. ISBN 978-3-030-04723-8.
- Edelmann, Alexander T. (1969). "The Rise and Demise of Uruguay's Second Plural Executive". The Journal of Politics. 31 (1): 119–139. doi:10.2307/2128563. JSTOR 2128563. S2CID 153786895.
- Espinosa, José Manuel (1931). The role of José Batlle y Ordóñez in Uruguayan history (MA). Stanford University. OCLC 25415015.
- Farnworth, Constance Helen (1952). The Agriculture of Uruguay. Washington, DC: Office of Foreign Agricultural Relations, United States Department of Agriculture.
- Filgueira, Fernando (1995). A Century of Social Welfare in Uruguay: Growth to the Limit of the Batllista Social State. University of Notre Dame (Report).
- Fitzgibbon, Russell H. (1954). Uruguay: Portrait of a Democracy. New Brunswick, N. J.: Rutgers University Press.
- Garay, Mario (2017). La idea de nación en el relato político durante las fiestas patrias del centenario en Treinta y Tres: (1925 y 1930) (PDF) (Masters thesis).
- Giudici, Roberto B. (1947). Fundamentos del batllismo (in Spanish). OCLC 11755870.
- Giudici, Roberto B.; González Conzi, Efraín (1928). Batlle y el batllismo (in Spanish). Montevideo: Imprento Nacional Colorada. OCLC 645388467.
- Grompone, Antonio M. (1984). La Ideología de Batlle (in Spanish). Montevideo: Librosur.
- Hanson, Simon Gabriel (1938). Utopia in Uruguay: Chapters in the Economic History of Uruguay. Oxford University Press.
- Hayes, Robert C. (1972). Labor Law and Practice in Uruguay. U.S. Bureau of Labor Statistics.
- Henderson, James D.; Henderson, Alexander C.; Delpar, Helen; Brungardt, Maurice Philip; Weldon, Richard N. (2000). A Reference Guide to Latin American History. M.E. Sharpe. ISBN 9781563247446.
- Hoover, John (1963). "Jose Batlle y Ordonez of Uruguay, the Creator of His Times, 1902–1907". The Western Political Quarterly. 16 (4). doi:10.2307/445874. JSTOR 445874.
- Hudson, Rex A.; Meditz, Sandra W., eds. (1990). "Batlle y Ordóñez and the Modern State". A Country Study. Washington, D.C.: US Library of Congress.
- "A Basis for a League of Peace". The Independent. 20 July 1914.
- Knarr, James Charles (2009). Batllismo and the Yankees: The United States and Uruguay, 1903–1929 (PhD). Ann Arbor, United States. ProQuest 288388292.
- Knarr, James C. (2011). "Uruguay's José Batlle y Ordóñez: The Determined Visionary, 1915–1917". Book Review. The Hispanic American Historical Review. 91 (2): 365–367. doi:10.1215/00182168-1165406.
- Knarr, James C. (2012). Uruguay and the United States, 1903–1929: Diplomacy in the Progressive Era. Kent, Ohio: Kent State University Press. doi:10.21038/ksup.2012.0015. ISBN 978-1-60635-128-4.
- "En sus 105 años, La Mañana evoca a su fundador". La Mañana. 29 June 2022.
- "El Uruguay Social por Redacción". La Mañana. 15 January 2020.
- Lopez-Alves, Fernando (2002). "Chapter 4: State Reform and Welfare in Uruguay, 1890–1930". In Dunkerley, James (ed.). Studies in the Formation of the Nation-State in Latin America. "In Table 1 I have shown the popular vote to the Chamber of Representatives and the Constitutional Assembly, because I do not have figures showing votes for Batllismo alone – while, under the electoral system of the time, the Colorado electoral ticket included other factions as well as the Batllista group.""
- Mañé Garzón, Fernando (2009). "Última enfermedad y muerte de don José Batlle y Ordóñez: 18 setiembre – 20 octubre 1929". Revista Médica del Uruguay. 25 (1): 59–68. ISSN 1688-0390.
- Manini Ríos, Carlos (1970). Anoche me llamó Batlle.
- Martin, Percy Alvin (1930). "The Career of José Batlle y Ordóñez". The Hispanic American Historical Review. 10 (4): 413–428. doi:10.2307/2518448. JSTOR 2518448.
- Merquior, J. G. (1983). "Radical Reformism in the Pampas: the case of Batllismo". Review. Government and Opposition. 18 (1): 120–124. doi:10.1017/S0017257X00018170. JSTOR 44483474.
- Moron, Isaac (1946). Anales de la Universidad Entrega N.° 157.
- "Ex-President of Uruguay Kills Editor In Formal Duel Fought With Pistols". The New York Times. Associated Press. 3 April 1920. p. 15.
- "Formal and Fatal Duel". The New York Times. 16 May 1920. p. 117.
- Nin y Silva, Celedonio (1930). La república del Uruguay en su primer centenario (1830–1930). Montevideo: J. Sureda.
- Oddone, Juan Antonio (1990). Uruguay entre la depresión y la guerra, 1929–1945. Fundación de Cultura Universitaria.
- "Uruguay – Message of the President". Bulletin of the Pan American Union. 23 (1). 1906.
- Parker, David S. (2010). "Uruguay's José Batlle y Ordóñez: The Determined Visionary, 1915–1917 by Milton I. Vanger". Reviews: Politics & Governance. The Americas. 67 (2): 273–275. JSTOR 40929651.
- Parker, William Belmont (1921). Uruguyans on to-day. New York: Hispanic Society of America.
- "José Batlle y Ordoñez". Partido Colorado. 23 April 2016.
- Partido Colorado: organización anticolegialista. 1916. p. 27.
- "Batlle y Ordóñez Gobernate 1898 – 1929: Guía de contenidos" (PDF). Partido Colorado.
- Pendle, George (1963). "José Batlle y Ordóñez of Uruguay: The Creator of his Times. 1902–1907". Reviews. International Affairs. 39 (4): 654. doi:10.2307/2609295. JSTOR 2609295.
- Peterson, Lars Edward (2014). In the Shadow of Batlle: Workers, State Officials, and the Creation of the Welfare State in Uruguay, 1900–1916 (PDF) (PhD).
- Pintos, Francisco R.; Fernández Ríos, Ovidio (1938). Batlle y el proceso histórico del Uruguay. C. García & cía.
- Porzecanski, Arturo C. (1978). "3 The Case of Uruguay Prepared". In Mesa-Lago, Carmelo (ed.). Social Security in Latin America Pressure Groups, Stratification, and Inequality.
- Posada-Carbo, Eduardo, ed. (1995). Wars, Parties and Nationalism Essays on the Politics and Society of Nineteenth-century Latin America. University of London Press.
- Presidencia de la Asamblea General y del Sendado; Presidencia de la Camara de Representantes (29 October 2013). "Parlamentarios Uruguayos 1830–2005" (PDF). www.parlamento.gub.uy (in Spanish). Archived from the original (PDF) on 29 October 2013.
- Ramos de Segarra, Aurelia (1904). Memoria de la Cruz Roja Uruguaya. Cruz Roja Uruguaya.
- "Banco de Seguros del Estado". Riqueza. No. 2. 30 September 1912.
- Sanguinetti, Julio María (17 March 2023). "Baltasar, el estadista". Partido Colorado.
- Pujol, Miguel J. (1996). Batlle el estado de bienestar en el Río de la Plata.
- Street, John (1964). "M. I. Vanger, "José Batlle y Ordóñez of Uruguay. The creator of his times. 1902–1907"". Book Review. Bulletin of Hispanic Studies. 41 (3): 201. doi:10.3828/bhs.41.3.206.
- Taylor Jr., Philip B. (1963). "José Batlle y Ordóñez of Uruguay. The Creator of His Times, 1902–1907". Book Review. Hispanic American Historical Review. 43 (4): 577–579. doi:10.1215/00182168-43.4.577.
- Traversoni, Alfredo; Lastra, Lilian (1977). El Uruguay en las primeras décadas del siglo XX. Editorial Kapelusz.
- Taylor, Philip B. Jr. (1960). Tulane Studies in Political Science Volume VII, Government and Politics of Uruguay. Tulane University.
- Daily Consular and Trade Reports, Issues 154–230 (Report). United States Bureau of Foreign and Domestic Commerce. 1912. p. 300.
- Commerce Reports. Vol. 2. United States. Bureau of Foreign and Domestic Commerce. 1912. p. 484.
- El Uruguay y su desarrollo economico: algunos índices representativos. United Nations General Assembly Delegation from Uruguay. 1950. p. 53.
- Universindo Rodríguez Díaz (2006). El sindicalismo uruguayo a 40 años del congreso de unificación. Taurus.
- Diario de sesiones de la Cámara de Senadores de la República Oriental del Uruguay (Report). Vol. 259. Uruguay General Assembly, Chamber of Senators. 1967.
- Van Aken, Mark (1981). "The Model Country: José Batlle y Ordóñez of Uruguay, 1907–1915". Book Review. The Hispanic American Historical Review. 61 (4): 774–775. doi:10.1215/00182168-61.4.774.
- Vanger, Milton I. (1963). José Batlle y Ordoñez of Uruguay: The Creator of His Times 1902–1907. Cambridge, Massachusetts: Harvard University Press. LCCN 62-19225.
- Vanger, Milton I. (1980). The Model Country: José Batlle y Ordoñez of Uruguay, 1907–1915. Hanover, New Hampshire: Brandeis University Press. ISBN 0874511844.
- Vanger, Milton I. (2010). Uruguay's José Batlle y Ordóñez: The Determined Visionary, 1915–1917. Boulder, Colorado: Lynne Rienner Publishers. ISBN 9781588266941.
- Vasquez Franc, Guillermo (1971). El país Batlle heredó (in Spanish). Montevideo: Fundación de Cultura Universita.

Political offices
Preceded by Juan Lindolfo Cuestas	President of Uruguay; Acting; 1899	Succeeded by Juan Lindolfo Cuestas
Preceded by Juan Lindolfo Cuestas	President of Uruguay; 1903–1907	Succeeded by Claudio Wílliman
Preceded by Claudio Wílliman	President of Uruguay; 1911–1915	Succeeded by Feliciano Viera
Preceded by Feliciano Viera	President of the National Council of Administration of Uruguay; 1921–1923	Succeeded by Julio María Sosa
