= National Statistics Institute (Uruguay) =

Uruguay's principal government institution in charge of statistics and census data

- Instituto Nacional de Estadística

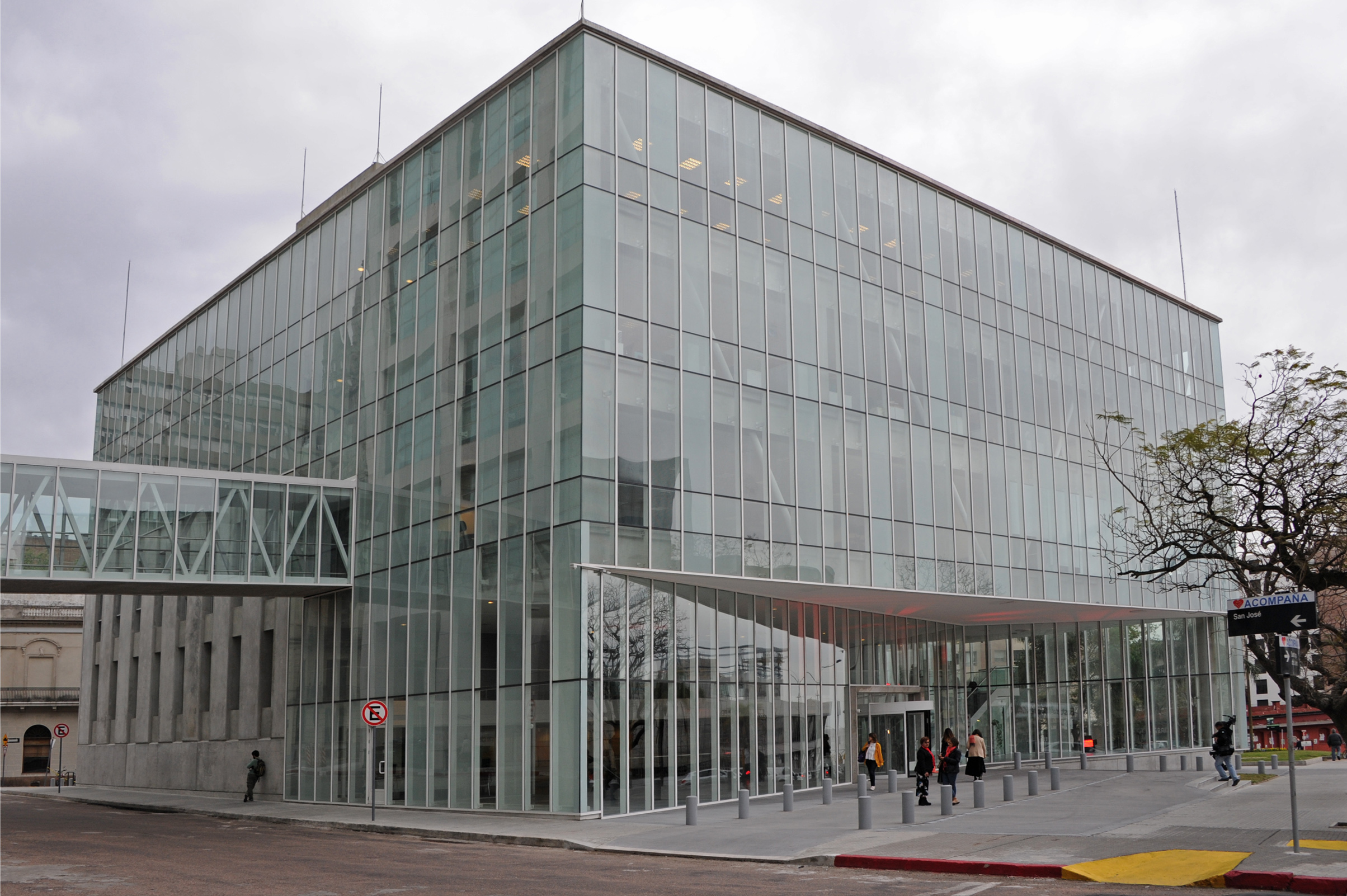
- INE headquarters, Montevideo.

Agency overview
- Formed: 25 November 1852 (173 years ago)
- Preceding agencies: Mesa Estadística; Dirección de Estadística General
- Jurisdiction: Presidency of Uruguay
- Headquarters: 1280 Liniers Street; Montevideo
- Agency executive: Marcelo Bisogno, Technical Director
- Website: ine.uy

The National Statistics Institute (Spanish: Instituto Nacional de Estadística, INE) is Uruguay’s government agency responsible for collecting, managing, and coordinating national statistical data. It operates under the Office of Planning and Budget, conducting surveys and censuses, as well as analyzing demographic, economic, and social information.

== History ==
Uruguay’s first governmental statistics agency was the Mesa Estadística (Spanish for 'Statistics Commission'), established on November 25, 1852, under the Ministry of Finance. Several years later, still within the 19th century, it was reorganized as the Dirección de Estadística General (Spanish for 'General Directorate of Statistics').

On March 27, 1953, Law No. 11,923 established the Junta Asesora de Estadística y Censos (Spanish for 'Advisory Board of Statistics and Censuses') to set regulations ensuring unified statistical activities nationwide. In turn, the newly created Dirección General de Estadística y Censos (Spanish for 'General Directorate of Statistics and Censuses') was appointed as its executive body. However, in 1981, the Advisory Board was dissolved and its functions transferred to the General Directorate, which in 1985 came under the authority of the Presidency of the Republic through the Office of Planning and Budget.

In 1993, the agency was given its current name. In 1994, the Statistics Law was approved, establishing the Sistema Estadístico Nacional (Spanish for 'National Statistical System') which is composed of the National Statistics Institute as its governing body, coordinating units, and statistical offices of the Executive, Legislative, and Judicial branches of Government, the Administrative Litigation Tribunal, the Electoral Court, the supreme audit institution, Autonomous State Entities and Decentralized Services, and Departmental Governments.
