= 1958 Uruguayan general election =

- 30 November 1958
- Registered: 1,410,105
- National Council of Government
Party	Vote %	Seats	+/–
National Party	49.68	6	+3
Colorado Party	37.70	3	−3
This lists parties that won seats. See the complete results below.
- Chamber of Deputies
Party	Vote %	Seats	+/–
National Party	49.68	51	+16
Colorado Party	37.70	38	−13
Civic Union	3.74	3	−2
Socialist	3.53	3	0
Communist	2.69	2	+2
URD	1.99	2	New
This lists parties that won seats. See the complete results below.
- Senate
Party	Vote %	Seats	+/–
National Party	49.68	17	+6
Colorado Party	37.70	12	−5
Civic Union	3.74	1	0
Socialist	3.53	1	0
This lists parties that won seats. See the complete results below.

General elections were held in Uruguay on 30 November 1958, alongside a constitutional referendum. Following the end of a schism between the National Party and the Independent National Party, the National Party received almost half the vote, winning a majority of seats in the National Council of Government, the Chamber of Deputies and the Senate, and allowing it to lead the government for the first time since 1865.

As per the electoral rule, all nominees (Martín Echegoyen, Benito Nardone, Eduardo Víctor Haedo, Faustino Harrison, Justo M. Alonso and Pedro Zalbalza) of the Herrerism group of the National Party, as the most-voted group of the most-voted party, were elected as members of the National Council of Government, with the first four as presidential members and the remaining as non-presidential members. The remaining seats were filled by the first two nominees of the most-voted group of the second-voted party, and the first nominee of the second-voted group of the same party, who were Manuel Rodríguez Correa and Ledo Arroyo Torres of the "Fifteenist" Batllism group and César Batlle Pacheco of the "Fourteenist" Batllism group.

== Results ==
Party	Votes	%	Seats				
Party	Votes	%	NCG	CoD	+/–	Sen	+/–
National Party	499,425	49.68	6	51	+16	17	+6
Colorado Party	379,062	37.70	3	38	–13	12	–5
Civic Union	37,625	3.74	0	3	–2	1	0
Socialist Party	35,478	3.53	0	3	0	1	0
Communist Party	27,080	2.69	0	2	0	0	0
Democratic Reformist Union	19,979	1.99	0	2	New	0	New
Renewal Movement	6,325	0.63	0	0	New	0	New
Passive Classes and Social Security Party	142	0.01	0	0	New	0	New
Revolutionary Workers' Party	142	0.01	0	0	New	0	New
Labour Party	52	0.01	0	0	New	0	New
Trade Union Workers' Front	52	0.01	0	0	New	0	New
**Total**	**1,005,362**	**100.00**	**9**	**99**	**0**	**31**	**0**
Registered voters/turnout	1,410,105	–					
Source: Electoral Court

=== Results of National Council of Government ===
Elected candidates are marked in bold.

Party	Group	Nominees	Votes
National Party	Dr. Luis Alberto de Herrera	**Martín Echegoyen**; **Benito Nardone**; **Eduardo Víctor Haedo**; **Faustino Harrison**; **Justo M. Alonso**; **Pedro Zabalza**	241,939
National Party	Democratic White Union	Salvador Ferrer Serra; Javier Barrios Amorín; Alberto Gallinal; Carlos M. Penadés; Gervasio A. de Posadas; Juan C. López	230,649
National Party	Intransigent Nationalism	Ángel M. Cusano; Amadeo J. Arosteguy; Francisco M. Ubillos; Antonio M. Fernández; Aparicio Méndez; Carlos A. Perera	26,522
Colorado Party	Batllism - For the Union of the Party	**Manuel Rodríguez Correa**; **Ledo Arroyo Torres**; Héctor Grauert; Amílcar Vasconcellos; Julio C. Estrella; Armando I. Barbieri	215,881
Colorado Party	Batllism - For the Ideals of Batlle	**César Batlle Pacheco**; Luis A. Brause; Juan P. Fabini; Orestes Lanza; Andrés Martínez Trueba; Armando R. Malet	154,110
Colorado Party	Batllism - Batllist Unity	Washington Fernández; Eduardo Jiménez de Aréchaga; Carlos Surraco; Juan Enrique Llovet; Ceibal Artigas; Felisindro Castro	8,514
Civic Union		Dardo Regules; Juan V. Chiarino; Julio C. García Otero; Tomás G. Brena; Horacio Terra Arocena; Miguel Saralegui	37,625
Socialist Party		Emilio Frugoni; Roberto Ibáñez; Aurelio V. Geronazzo; Adolfo M. Ballesteros; Leopoldo Agorio; Félix O. Barthagaray	35,478
Communist Party		Francisco R. Pintos; Bernabé Michelena; Julio Baccino	27,080
Democratic Reformist Union		Juan José Aguiar; José Martirene; Arsenio M. Bargo; José G. Antuña; León Peyrou; Alfredo Terra	19,979
Renewal Movement		Humberto May; Edgardo U. Genta; Enrique Buero Álvarez; Federico Sourmastre; Héctor Lagarmilla; Julio Badano Repetto	6,325
Revolutionary Workers' Party		Zulma Nogara; Luis E. Naguil; José Manginelli; Elena Amestoy; Luis A. Ponce; Tabaré García	142
Passive Classes and Social Security Party		Andrés Folle Illa; Julio P. Aicardi; Jorge P. Servetti Sosa; Fileno F. Sosa; Valentín Pena Barreto; Dionisio Ramis	142
Labour Party		Pedro Roirás; Héctor P. Rodríguez; Julio Díaz Peluffo; Elio G. Pereyra; José Vila; Paz Timoteo Carballo	52
Trade Union Workers' Front		Ricardo Volpe; Raúl Martín; Jorge Hernández	52
