= Azucena Arbeleche =

Uruguayan economist, professor, and civil servant

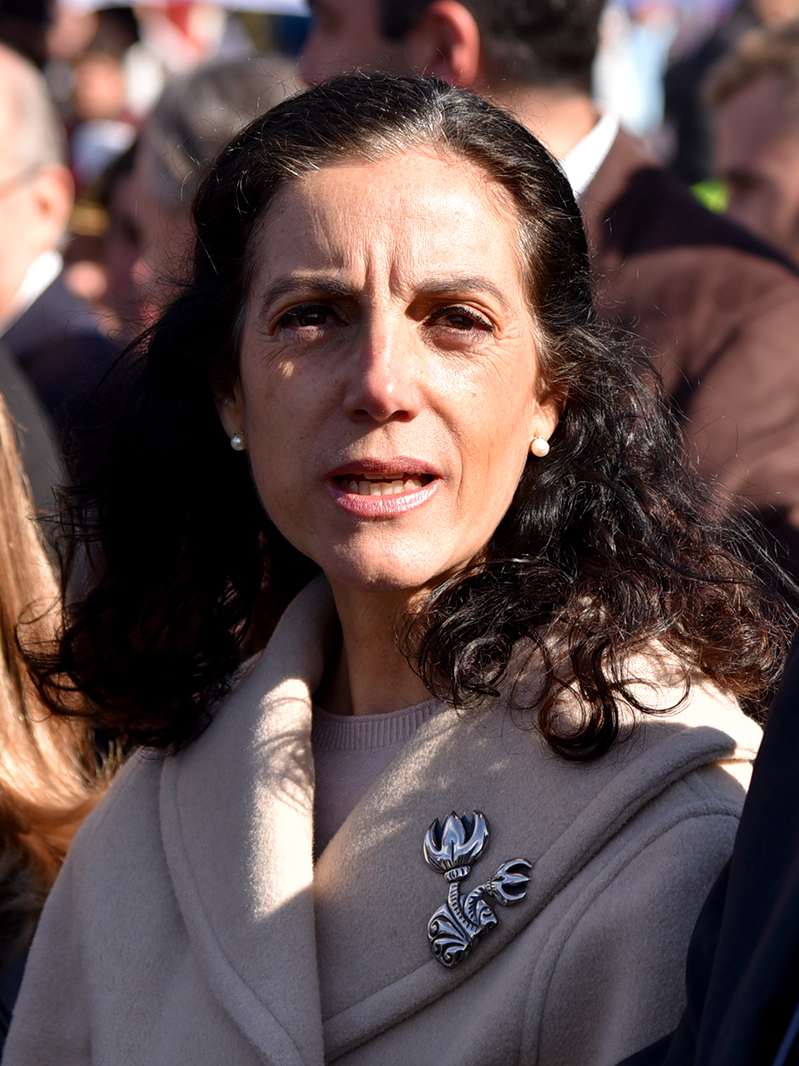
- Arbeleche in 2023

Minister of Economy and Finance of Uruguay
- In office 1 March 2020 – 28 February 2025
- President: Luis Alberto Lacalle Pou
- Preceded by: Danilo Astori
- Succeeded by: Gabriel Oddone

Personal details
- Born: Azucena María Arbeleche Perdomo; 29 September 1970 (age 55) Uruguay
- Party: National Party
- Spouse: Juan Alzugaray
- Children: 3
- Education: University of the Republic
- Occupation: Economist, professor, politician, civil servant

Azucena María Arbeleche Perdomo (born 29 September 1970) is a Uruguayan professor, economist and civil servant who served as Minister of Economy and Finance of Uruguay from 2020 to 2025 under president Luis Lacalle Pou, being the first woman to hold that office.

== Early life and education ==
Azucena María Arbeleche Perdomo was born in 1970, the daughter of Beltrán José Arbeleche and Theresita Perdomo. She attended The British Schools of Montevideo, and in 1996 graduated from the University of the Republic with a degree in economics. She also obtained a master's degree in applied macroeconomics from the Pontifical Catholic University of Chile.

== Career ==
While she was in her fourth year of college, she worked for the Office of Planning and Budget. From March 1995 to December 1996, she served as a collaborator at BGV Corredores de Bolsa, and from 1998 to 2000 at the Center for Economic and Financial Research in Santiago.

In 2001 she joined the Macroeconomic Advisory of the Ministry of Economy and Finance, at the request of her former professor ant then minister Isaac Alfie. In that position, she participated in the design and implementation of measures against the 2002 crisis, and in the restructuring process of the total government debt in May 2003. From 2005 to 2010, she served as an advisor to the Debt Management Unit of the Ministry of Economy and Finance, at the request of then-minister Danilo Astori. She was its head from 2011 to 2014, when she resigned to join the presidential campaign of Luis Lacalle Pou as economic adviser.

Between 2015 and 2019 she dedicated herself to carrying out independent consultancies in debt management abroad through the International Monetary Fund, the World Bank and the Plata Basin Financial Development Fund. She also held the position of director of the Center for Studies of the National Party. Arbeleche was a professor at institutions such as the University of the Republic, the Catholic University of Uruguay, Andrés Bello National University and the University of Montevideo.

A member of the National Party, Arbeleche was in charge of economic issues for the presidential campaigns of Luis Lacalle Pou in 2014 and 2019. On 16 December 2019, she was formally announced by the president-elect Lacalle Pou as head of the Ministry of Economy and Finance, becoming on 1 March 2020, the first woman to hold the position. During the process of reactivating the Uruguayan economy as a result of the COVID-19 pandemic, Arbeleche expressed her admiration for Keynesian economics.

== Other activities ==
- Inter-American Development Bank (IDB), Ex-Officio Member of the Board of Governors (since 2020)

== Personal life ==
With her husband Juan Alzugaray, Arbeleche has two sons born in Chile and a daughter born in Boston. She is a Roman Catholic and has done social work as a catechist and teacher in slums.

In 2014 she was featured on the cover of the magazine Seis Grados of the newspaper El Observador.
