= Masden =

Masden may refer to:

- Pedro Cosio Masden (1873–1943), Uruguayan politician
- Dr. Lawrence Masden, a fictional character from 2014 American science fiction film Earth to Echo
- Robert J. Masden, pseudonym of Herman Lamm (1890–1930), German-American bank robber
