= 1946 Uruguayan constitutional referendum =

A constitutional referendum was held in Uruguay on 24 November 1946, alongside general elections. Two options for amending the constitution were put to voters, but both were rejected.

== Proposals ==
Two proposals for amending the constitution were put to voters. Proposal 1 was put forward by the Battlismo faction of the Colorado Party and the Independent National Party, and would allow government initiatives to be approved by two-fifths of members of the Chamber of Deputies, would bring back the Colegiado system of government, and separate election dates. Proposal 2 was put forward by the Civic Union, and would allow referendums to be held on constitutional changes if 10% of registered voters signed a petition, would allow for the separate election of the President and Vice President, and also scrap the lema system.

== Results ==
Choice	Votes	%
Initiative 1	289,101	43.14
Initiative 2	252,353	37.65
Against both	128,775	19.21
Total	670,229	100
Registered voters/turnout	993,892	67.43
Source: Direct Democracy
