= Juan Carlos Blanco Acevedo =

Uruguayan politician

Juan Carlos Blanco Acevedo (6 December 1879 – 3 May 1952) was a Uruguayan politician.

== Background ==
A lawyer by profession, he was from a distinguished Uruguayan political family. His father Juan Carlos Blanco Fernández was Foreign Minister of Uruguay in the late 19th century. His brother Daniel Blanco Acevedo was a Deputy for Montevideo. His nephew Juan Carlos Blanco Estradé was to be Foreign Minister of Uruguay.

== Political role and office ==
Juan Carlos Blanco Acevedo was a prominent member of the Uruguayan Colorado Party.

He was Foreign Minister of Uruguay 1924-1926 under the Presidency of José Serrato.

== See also ==
- Politics of Uruguay
- List of political families
