= Juan Carlos Blanco Estradé =

Uruguayan lawyer (1934–2021)

Juan Carlos Blanco Estradé (19 June 1934, Montevideo – 22 August 2021) was a Uruguayan lawyer and political figure.

== Background ==
Blanco came from a distinguished Uruguayan political family. His father, Daniel Blanco Acevedo, was a Deputy representing Montevideo in the 1940s and 1950s. His grandfather, Juan Carlos Blanco Fernández, was himself Uruguayan Foreign Minister in the 19th century. His uncle, Juan Carlos Blanco Acevedo, was Foreign Minister in the 1920s.

He was a prominent member of the Colorado Party.

== Early career ==
Blanco qualified as a lawyer.

Subsequently, he worked for many years for the Organization of American States.

== Political offices ==
Blanco was Foreign Minister of Uruguay from 1972 to 1976. His name is closely associated with the civic-military dictatorship. In 2002 he received a sentence of imprisonment for the disappearance of activist Elena Quinteros in 1976, who had been kidnapped from the Venezuelan Embassy in Paraguay. As a civilian he was not protected by the Lay de Caducidad. Quinteros is considered one of the Disappeared. In 2005 he was also indicted for the murders of the reporter Zelmar Michelini and politician Héctor Gutiérrez Ruiz. He received a life sentence and died in prison.

He was Uruguayan Ambassador to the United Nations from 1982 to 1985.

Subsequently, he served in the Senate from 1990 to 1995 and was regarded as being close politically with Jorge Pacheco Areco, a former President of Uruguay.

== See also ==
- Politics of Uruguay
- List of political families
