= Daniel Blanco Acevedo =

Uruguayan lawyer and political figure

Daniel Blanco Acevedo (1879 in Montevideo – 1971) was a Uruguayan lawyer and political figure.

== Background ==
A member of the Uruguayan Colorado Party, Daniel Blanco Acevedo's father Juan Carlos Blanco Fernández was a Foreign Minister and Deputy in the 19th century. His son Juan Carlos Blanco Estradé was himself to be Foreign Minister in the 1970s. His brother Juan Carlos Blanco Acevedo was Foreign Minister in the 1920s.

== Political offices ==
He was Minister of Finance from 1927 to 1929. He served as a Deputy for Montevideo in the 1940s and 1950s.

He was appointed Deputy Speaker of the Uruguayan Chamber of Deputies in 1951.

== See also ==
- Politics of Uruguay
- List of political families
