= 1958 Uruguayan constitutional referendum =

A constitutional referendum was held in Uruguay on 30 November 1958 alongside general elections. Two proposals for amendments to the constitution were put to voters, but both were rejected.

== Proposals ==
Proposal 1 was put forward by the Ruralista/Herrerista faction of the National Party through the General Assembly, and proposed a presidential system of government, separating the presidential and parliamentary elections, and abolishing the lema system.

Proposal 2 was put forward by the Civic Union through a popular initiative, and proposed introducing a presidential system of government.

== Results ==
Choice	Votes	%
Proposal 1	235,941	23.04
Proposal 2	153,662	15.01
Against both	634,080	61.95
Total	429,760	100
Registered voters/turnout	1,158,939	37.08
Source: Direct Democracy
