= Pedro Cosio Masden =

Uruguayan politician and diplomat

Minister of Public Works of Uruguay
- In office 1913–1916
- President: José Batlle y Ordóñez

Uruguayan Ambassador to Spain
- In office October 18, 1916 – 1916
- President: Feliciano Viera
- Preceded by: Eduardo Vázquez
- Succeeded by: Benjamín Fernández y Medina

Uruguayan Ambassador to the United Kingdom
- In office 1917–1918
- President: Feliciano Viera
- Preceded by: Federico Vidiella
- Succeeded by: Antonio Bachini

Ambassador of Uruguay to the United States
- In office November 21, 1918 – February, 1919
- President: Feliciano Viera
- Preceded by: Hugo V. de Pena
- Succeeded by: Jacobo Varela

Uruguayan Ambassador to Germany
- In office 1927–1932
- President: Juan Campisteguy
- Preceded by: Antonio Bachini
- Succeeded by: Enrique Buero

Uruguayan Ambassador to the United Kingdom
- In office 1932–1933
- President: Gabriel Terra
- Preceded by: Federico Vidiella
- Succeeded by: Alberto Guani

Minister of Finance
- In office 1933–1934
- President: Gabriel Terra
- Preceded by: Pedro Manini Ríos
- Succeeded by: César Charlone

Personal details
- Born: October 3, 1873 Montevideo
- Died: August 25, 1943 (aged 69)
- Education: studied Accounting at the National Colegio of the Patriotic League of Instruction.

Pedro Cosio Masden was a Uruguayan politician and diplomat.

- In 1910 as Candidate of the Colorado Party (Uruguay) he was elected 24th legislative period as representative of the Department of Montevideo in the Chamber of Representatives of Uruguay from 15 February 1911 to 27 March 1913.
- From 1913 to 1916 he was Minister of Public Works.
- In 1916 he was Minister plenipotentiary in Madrid.
- From 1917 to June, 1918 and from 1932 to 1933 he was Minister plenipotentiary in London.
- From June, 1918 to February, 1919 he was Minister plenipotentiary in Washington, D.C.
- From 1927 to 1932 he was Minister plenipotentiary in Berlin.
- From 1933 to 1934 he was Minister of Finance of Uruguay.

== Biography ==
- He entered a career at the Customs service.
- He became Assistant in the Custom House Service, Inspector of Frontiers, and Sub-Treasurer General, commissioned especially by the Government to make studies on inland and river Custom Houses.
- From March, 1919 to 1923 he was elected National Counsellor in the Senate of Uruguay.
- In 1915 he presided over the Uruguayan delegation sent to the First Financial Conference at Washington.
- In April, 1916 he led the Uruguayan Commission to the first Commission meeting in Buenos Aires of the first Pan American Financial Conference in 1915 called to study the question of uniform legislation.
- From 1921 to 1923 he was editor of El Siglo (Uruguay) and collaborator on El Día, El Diario Nuevo, and La Mañana of Montevideo, and La Nación of Buenos Aires.

== Publications ==
- Two volumes of official reports dealing with Custom House questions;
- Tarifas de aduana y tratados de comercio, a pamphlet;
- Post-War Organisation of Labour in the United Kingdom, a pamphlet in English; * La conversion y los problemas del credito, a pamphlet.
- Regimen bancario; Ensayos Politicos, 1897.
- El doctor Rene, a novel, 1903.
- Accidentes del trabajo, 1908.
- La proteccion industrial y la Jornada de ocho horas, 1908.
- Tarifas de aduana, 1910.
- La ensenanza profesional, 1910.
- El poder ejecutivo colegiado, 1915.
