= Alejandro Atchugarry =

Uruguayan politician (1952–2017)

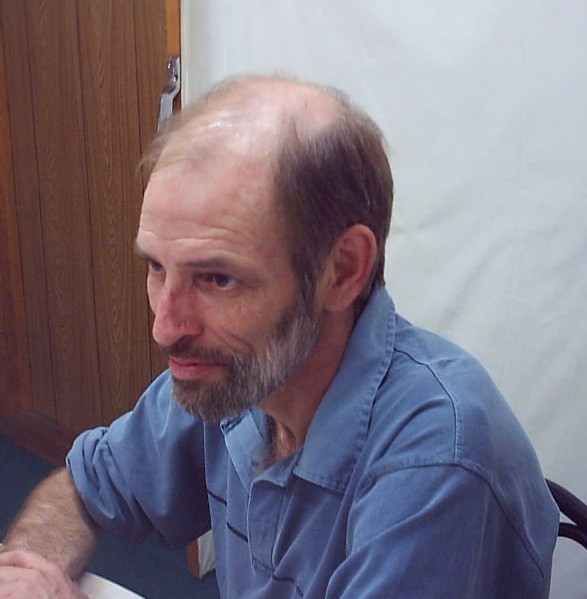

Minister of Economy and Finance of Uruguay
- In office 24 July 2002 – 19 August 2003
- President: Jorge Batlle
- Preceded by: Alberto Bensión
- Succeeded by: Isaac Alfie

Personal details
- Born: Alejandro Víctor Washington Atchugarry Bonomi; 31 July 1952 Montevideo, Uruguay
- Died: 19 February 2017 (aged 64) Montevideo, Uruguay
- Party: Colorado
- Education: University of the Republic
- Profession: lawyer

Alejandro Víctor Washington Atchugarry Bonomi (31 July 1952 in Montevideo – 19 February 2017 in Montevideo) was a Uruguayan lawyer and politician.

He was Minister of Economics and Finance during the most difficult period in Jorge Batlle's presidency, the 2002 Uruguay banking crisis, with a widely acknowledged role in the solution of Uruguay's worst economic moment in a century.

Atchugarry died of an aneurysm in Montevideo on 19 February 2017, aged 64.

== Bibliography ==
- Paolillo, Claudio (2004). Con los días contados. Editorial Fin de Siglo. p. 430. ISBN 9789974493209.

== Documentary ==
- Jorge Batlle: entre el cielo y el infierno. A 2024 documentary directed by Federico Lemos.

== See also ==
- South American economic crisis of 2002
- 1998–2002 Argentine great depression
- 2002 Uruguay banking crisis
- Latin American debt crisis
