= Álvaro García Rodríguez =

Uruguayan politician

Álvaro García
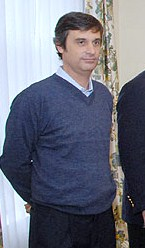

Minister of Economy and Finance of Uruguay
- In office 18 September 2008 – 1 March 2010
- Preceded by: Danilo Astori
- Succeeded by: Fernando Lorenzo

Personal details
- Born: 19 September 1961 (age 65) Montevideo, Uruguay
- Party: Broad Front
- Education: University of the Republic
- Profession: Accountant and economist

Álvaro García Rodríguez (born 19 September 1961) is a Uruguayan politician.

== Background ==
He has a professional background in both private and public sector appointments in finance and planning.

García also taught at two Uruguayan universities for a number of years.

He is a member of the Uruguayan Socialist Party.

== Political role ==
He was Minister of Economy and Finance in the Frente Amplio Government of President of Uruguay Tabaré Vázquez, having taken office on 18 September 2008.

When García came to office, it was thought likely that he would follow broadly the policies of his predecessor, Danilo Astori.

As of 1 March 2015, President Tabaré Vázquez appointed him as head of the Office of Planning and Budget.

== See also ==
- Politics of Uruguay
- Broad Front (Uruguay)

Political offices
Preceded by Danilo Astori	Minister of Economy and Finances; 2008 – 03/2010	Succeeded by Fernando Lorenzo
