= Isaac Alfie =

Uruguayan economist

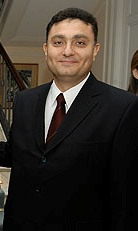

Director of the Office of Planning and Budget
- In office 1 March 2020 – 15 December 2023
- President: Luis Alberto Lacalle Pou
- Preceded by: Álvaro García Rodríguez
- Succeeded by: Fernando Blanco

Minister of Economy and Finance of Uruguay
- In office 19 August 2003 – 1 March 2005
- President: Jorge Batlle
- Preceded by: Alejandro Atchugarry
- Succeeded by: Danilo Astori

Personal details
- Born: April 27, 1962 (age 64) Montevideo, Uruguay
- Party: Colorado
- Education: University of the Republic
- Profession: accountant, economist

Isaac Alfie Stochek (born 27 April 1962) is a Uruguayan economist, accountant and politician of the Colorado Party. He served as head of the Office of Planning and Budget from 2020 to 2023. He previously served as Minister of Economy and Finance during the final years of Jorge Batlle's presidential term (2003–2005).

== Early life ==
Isaac Alfie Stochek was born in the barrio Palermo, Montevideo into a Jewish family. His father was a public employee and her mother a commercial employee. His paternal family was militant of the Colorado Party, while the maternal one was originally of the socialist Emilio Frugoni.

== Career ==
Alfie graduated from the University of the Republic in 1984 with a degree in public accounting and years later, he obtained a degree in economics from the same college.

In 1986 he joined the Office of Planning and Budget with the position of junior economist in the Department of Social Policies. In 1991 he joined the Ministry of Economy and Finance as an adviser in the area of Macroeconomic Advisory. He also represented Uruguay in several negotiations with international organizations, such as the one that resulted in the rescheduling of Uruguayan public debt in 2003. In addition, he was a consultant for the Inter-American Development Bank, the World Bank, the Pan American Health Organization, and the World Health Organization. In the private sector, he was a business consultant, especially in the areas of financial and cost analysis, and study of investment projects.

He also served as adjunct professor of the Department of Economics of the University of the Republic, where he taught basic macroeconomics. He also worked as a teacher at the University ORT Uruguay, and at the University of Belgrano in Argentina. He is currently a professor of Economics and public finance at the University of Montevideo.

== Political career ==
In August 2003, following the resignation of Alejandro Atchugarry, President Jorge Batlle appointed Alfie Minister of Economy and Finance. His period as head of the portfolio ended on March 1, 2005, when he was succeeded by Danilo Astori.

He also served as Senator of the Republic for List 15 of the Colorado Party in the XLVI Legislature (2005−10). In the 2019 presidential primaries, he supported the pre-candidacy of former President Julio María Sanguinetti. On December 16, when President-elect Luis Lacalle Pou announced his cabinet, Alfie was appointed Director of the Office of Planning and Budget (OPP) as a member of the Coalición Multicolor.

== Other activities ==
In the elections for the Board of Directors of Club Atlético Peñarol held in November 2008, Isaac Alfie accompanied the opposition list No. 2809, led by Daniel Benech, whose motto was "Peñarol is the people." This list would be in second place in number of votes, after the officialismo, headed by Juan Pedro Damiani.

Alfie writes in the economics supplement of the El País newspaper in Montevideo.
