= Gabriel Oddone =

Uruguayan economist

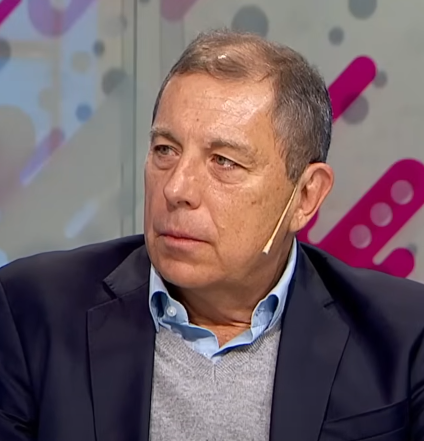
- Oddone in 2024

Minister of Economy and Finance of Uruguay
- Incumbent
- Assumed office 1 March 2025
- President: Yamandú Orsi
- Preceded by: Azucena Arbeleche

Personal details
- Born: Gabriel Oddone París; 5 September 1963 (age 63) Montevideo, Uruguay
- Party: Broad Front
- Education: University of the Republic
- Occupation: Economist

Gabriel Oddone París (born 5 September 1963) is a Uruguayan economist who serves as Minister of Economy and Finance of Uruguay since 2025 under president Yamandú Orsi.

== Biography ==
He is a son of the academic Blanca París de Oddone.

Oddone studied economics at the University of the Republic and later at the University of Barcelona. He has worked as a notable advisor in economics and finance, both in Uruguay and abroad.

Ideologically aligned with the Broad Front, he has worked as an advisor for that party. In 2024 he was announced as a future minister of economy and finance by president elect Yamandú Orsi. He will have to face a country which is stable and serious, but hard to change.

== Selected works ==
- 2024, El despegue: cómo crecer y distribuir en Uruguay, en la mirada de Gabriel Oddone (with Nicolás Batalla). Montevideo: Debate.
- 2017, Historia institucional del Banco Central del Uruguay (with Julio de Brun, Ariel Banda, and Juan Andrés Moraes). Ediciones de la Banda Oriental.
- 2010, El declive. Una mirada de la economía de Uruguay del siglo XX. Montevideo: Linardi y Risso.
