= Fernando Lorenzo =

Uruguayan economist and politician

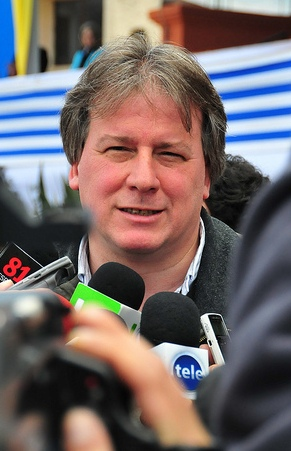

Minister of Economy and Finance of Uruguay
- In office March 1, 2010 – December 26, 2013
- Preceded by: Álvaro García
- Succeeded by: Mario Bergara

Personal details
- Born: January 31, 1960 (age 66) Montevideo, Uruguay
- Party: Broad Front
- Education: University of the Republic; Paris Dauphine University; Charles III University of Madrid
- Profession: economist

Fernando Lorenzo Estefan (born January 31, 1960, in Montevideo) is a Uruguayan economist and politician.

Lorenzo graduated in Economics at the University of the Republic in 1984. Afterwards he obtained a Diplome d'Etudes Approfondies en Economie et Finances Internationales at the Paris Dauphine University and a doctorate from the Charles III University of Madrid.

He was the principal of CINVE (1997–2004). He also delivers lectures at the ORT University and the University of the Republic.

He served as Minister of Economy and Finance (2010–2013).

== Bibliography ==
- Fernando Lorenzo; Diego Aboal (2006). Fundamentos para la cooperación macroeconómica en el MERCOSUR. Siglo Veintiuno. ISBN 978-987-1013-44-9.
