= Amílcar Vasconcellos =

Uruguayan politician

Senator of Uruguay Deputy of Uruguay Minister

Personal details
- Born: Amílcar Omar Vasconcellos; 22 September 1915 Artigas, Uruguay
- Died: 22 October 1999 (84 years old) Montevideo
- Political party: Colorado Party
- Education: University of the Republic

Amílcar Vasconcellos (Artigas, 22 September 1915 - Montevideo, 22 October. 1999) was a Uruguayan politician, lawyer, government minister and Senator. In 1967 he challenged Óscar Diego Gestido to a duel. He was Minister of Economy and Finance from 1957 to 1958 and in 1967.
