= Juan Carlos Blanco Fernández =

Uruguayan politician

Juan Carlos Blanco Fernández (15 September 1847 – 13 January 1910) was a Uruguayan political figure and education advocate.

== Background ==
He was closely identified with the Colorado and Constitutional Parties.

He married Luisa Acevedo Vásquez, daughter of the prominent jurist Eduardo Acevedo Maturana. His son Daniel Blanco Acevedo was to become a Deputy for Montevideo. His son Juan Carlos Blanco Acevedo was himself to become Foreign Minister of Uruguay. His grandson Juan Carlos Blanco Estradé was also to become Foreign Minister of Uruguay.

== Political offices ==
He was Foreign Minister of Uruguay in 1886. He served as the President of the Senate of Uruguay from 1901 to 1902.

He had been elected to serve as Deputy for Montevideo in 1873.

== Other notable activities ==
He was identified with the cause of education reform in Uruguay and was a close associate of Pedro Varela and others in this field.

He was President of the Bank of the Republic 1907–1910.

== Death ==
He died in 1910.

== See also ==
- Politics of Uruguay
- List of political families
