= Ledo Arroyo Torres =

Uruguayan notary and politician (1894–1975)

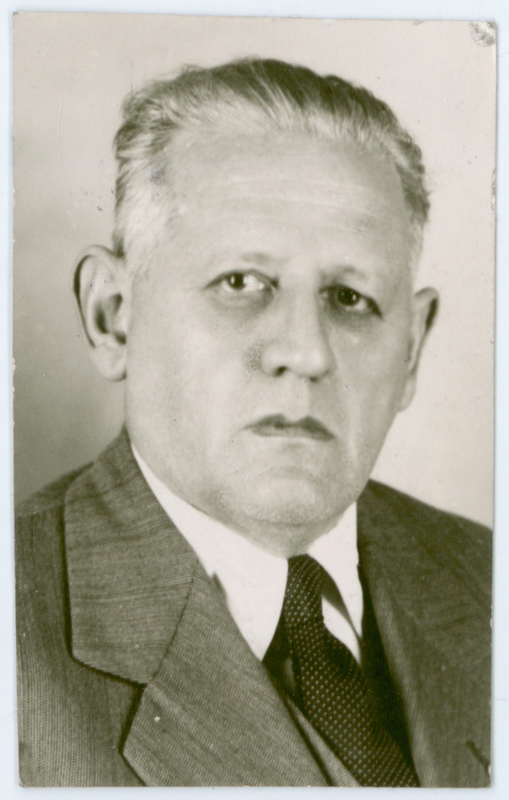
Image of Ledo Arroyo Torres

Ledo Arroyo Torres (1894–1975) was a Uruguayan notary and politician.

== Background and government roles ==
Arroyo was a member of the Uruguayan Colorado Party, which ruled the country for long periods. He was Minister of Economy and Finance from 1947 to 1949, and served as Minister of National Defence from 1952 to 1954.

== Later roles ==
He was President of the Senate of Uruguay from March 1, 1955 to March 1, 1959. He was Minister of Economy and Finance from 1956 to 1957. From 1959 until 1963, he served as minority member of the National Council of Government (Uruguay). He later served on Montevideo's City council. Arroyo also served on the board of the Bank of the Republic from 1965 to 1967.

== See also ==
- Politics of Uruguay
