= Independent National Party (Uruguay) =

- Founded: 1931
- Dissolved: 1958
- Split from: National Party
- Ideology: Uruguayan nationalism
- Political position: Right-wing

The Independent National Party (Spanish: Partido Nacional Independiente), also known locally as Independent Nationalism (Spanish: Nacionalismo Independiente), was a political party in Uruguay.

The party was founded as a rejection of the caudillo personalism represented in the National Party by the figure of Luis Alberto de Herrera, and had two important journalistic spokespersons: the morning newspaper El País and the evening newspaper El Plata, which, as noted by one study, “at a certain point expressed different and opposite nuances, even within Independent Nationalism.” The group was not perfectly homogeneous, with one observer at the time noting that “it is made up of small and great trends that vary from reactionism to those that support more radical ideas. (...) It's not possible to harmonize on the same tuning fork those who have been enemies of the minimum wage and those who have defended it as an essential necessity.” The Independent Nationalist Party maintained a firm opposition to the regime of Gabriel Terra, but after the Second World War, as noted by one study, “it was characterized by its growing identification with the politics of the United States, as well as its increasingly conservative positions on economic-social matters.”

The Independent National Party would eventually make up with the Herrerista National Party and return to Blanco unity, in the late 1950s. The union between Blancos was an important factor in the National Party's victory in the 1958 general elections, which broke with almost a century of Colorado rule in Uruguay. The Blanco factions that had made up the Independent National Party formed a new sector in the reunified National Party, called Unión Blanca Democrática (Blanco Democratic Union), which would become the most voted Blanco faction in the 1962 elections, elections in which the National Party repeated their victory over Colorados.

Among the most prominent members of the Independent National Party were: Martín C. Martínez, Washington Beltrán Mullin, and Juan A. Ramírez.

== Sources ==
- Uruguayan electoral system
