= Danilo Astori =

Uruguayan politician and economist (1940–2023)

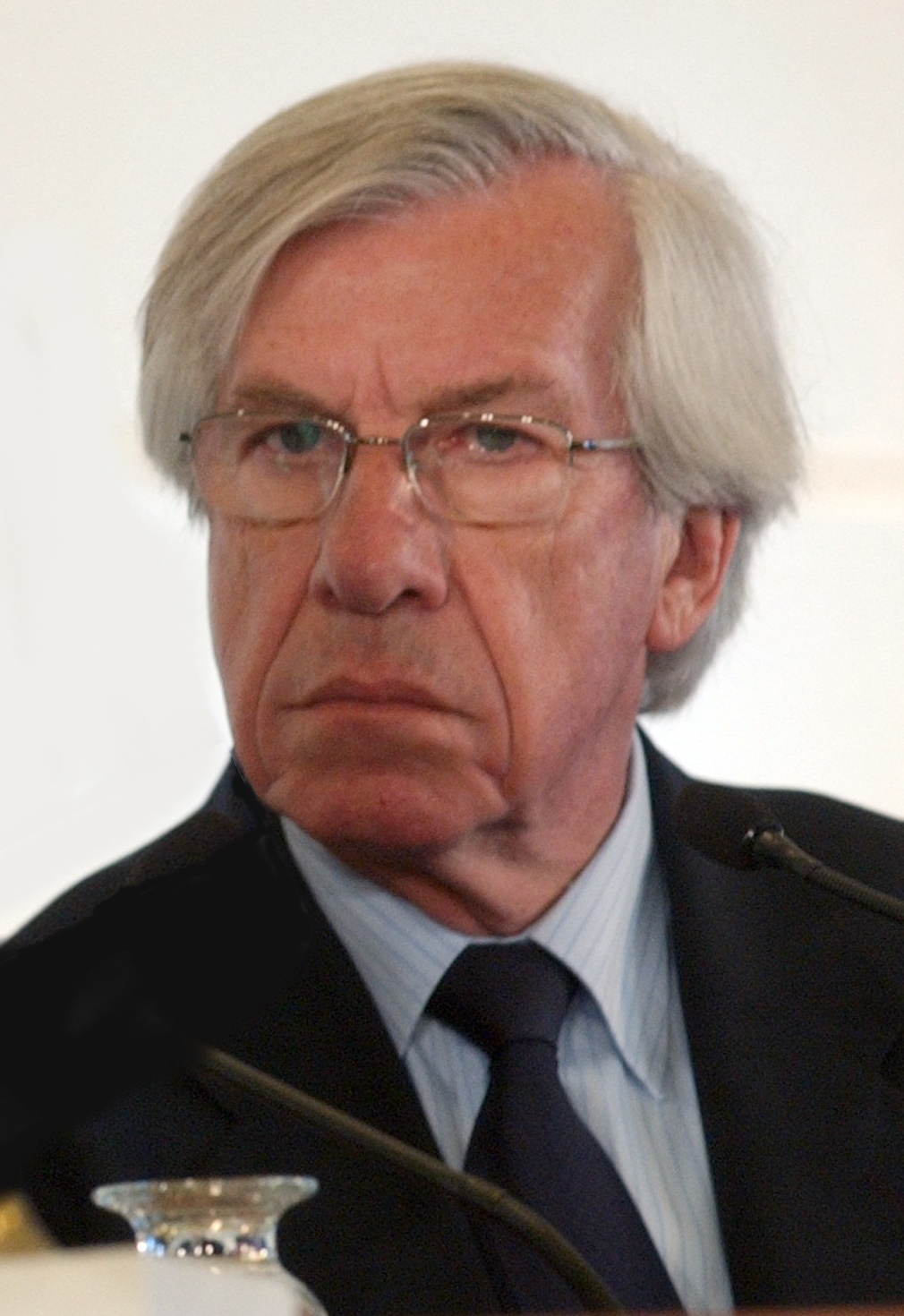
- Astori in 2007

15th Vice President of Uruguay
- In office 1 March 2010 – 1 March 2015
- President: José Mujica
- Preceded by: Rodolfo Nin Novoa
- Succeeded by: Raúl Sendic Rodríguez

Minister of Economy and Finance
- In office 4 March 2015 – 1 March 2020
- President: Tabaré Vázquez
- Preceded by: Mario Bergara
- Succeeded by: Azucena Arbeleche
- In office 1 March 2005 – 18 September 2008
- President: Tabaré Vázquez
- Preceded by: Isaac Alfie
- Succeeded by: Álvaro García

Senator of the Republic
- In office 1 March 2020 – 15 November 2022
- In office 15 February 1990 – 1 March 2005

Personal details
- Born: Danilo Ángel Astori Saragosa; 23 April 1940 Montevideo, Uruguay
- Died: 10 November 2023 (aged 83) Montevideo, Uruguay
- Party: Uruguay Assembly
- Other political affiliations: Broad Front
- Spouse: Claudia Hugo
- Education: University of the Republic
- Occupation: Accountant, economist, politician
- Website: www.2121.org.uy

Danilo Ángel Astori Saragosa (23 April 1940 – 10 November 2023) was a Uruguayan social democratic politician and economist who served as the 15th vice president of Uruguay from 2010 to 2015 under President José Mujica. A member of Uruguay Assembly–Broad Front, he also served as Minister of Economy and Finance from 2005 to 2008 and from 2015 to 2020, and as Senator of the Republic from 1990 to 2005.

== Early life ==
Danilo Astori was born on 23 April 1940, and was raised in the capital city of Montevideo. Astori was of Italian (Lombardy-Piedmont) descent; both grandparents of his paternal and maternal side were from the towns of Como and Novi Ligure. Astori completed his primary and secondary studies at the Liceo y Colegio Maturana in Bella Vista. In 1958, he enrolled in the Faculty of Economics of the University of the Republic, and in 1963 he graduated as a public accountant and economist. After graduating, he began working with the then deputy minister of livestock and leader of the National Party, Wilson Ferreira Aldunate. In 1965, Astori took a United Nations Development and Planning course in Santiago. Two years later, he participated in a seminar on statistical indicators of agricultural development organized by the Food and Agriculture Organization and the government of the Soviet Union in Moscow. He returned to the University of the Republic to serve as a professor at the Faculty of Economics of the University of the Republic, of which he was named dean in 1973, being the youngest person to hold the position. Since 1983, during the civic-military dictatorship, he conducted a radio audition entitled "Análisis Económicos". He also dabbled in written journalism, participating in the weeklies Aquí and Brecha.

== Political career ==
At the age of 23, he began working with Wilson Ferreira Aldunate, being in charge of the Office of Agricultural Policy and Programming (OPYPA), while Ferreira Aldunate was vice minister of the Ministry of Livestock and Agriculture. The founding of OPYPA was part of the establishment of the indicative planning process in Uruguay and, among other products, generated the first National Plan for Agricultural Development.

In 1989 he ran for Vice President of the Republic, as Líber Seregni's running mate, finishing in third place with 20.35%. He was also in the first place of all the ballots for the Senate, being elected Senator of the Republic for the 43rd Legislature. In 1994 he founded Uruguay Assembly, a faction within the Broad Front, for which he was re-elected senator in the 1994 and 1999 elections. In 2005, with the inauguration of Tabaré Vázquez, the first president of the Broad Front, Astori was appointed Minister of Economy and Finance. On 18 September 2008, he resigned from the Cabinet post and returned to his Senate seat, which he had re-won in the 2004 election.

In the 2009 presidential primaries, he was a pre-candidate for the Presidency of the Republic but was defeated by José Mujica. However, Mujica named him his running mate, and the presidential formula won the runoff of the October general election. In December 2014, after the election of Tabaré Vázquez again as president, Astori was appointed Minister of Economy and Finance.

In 2019 Astori was elected a senator for the 49th Legislature. The presidential candidate of the Broad Front Daniel Martínez proposed him as Minister of Foreign Relations in a possible government. In November 2022, he resigned from the Senate due to health problems.

== Policies ==
Astori followed a fiscal conservative policy, but allowing increases in welfare, education and health care spending. He was a supporter of trade pacts with the United States, the European Union, the People's Republic of China and India, with the Chilean "open regionalism" as a model.

== Death ==
In October 2023, Astori was hospitalised with a fractured hip; he subsequently died of respiratory failure on 10 November 2023, at the age of 83.

Political offices
Preceded by Isaac Alfie	Minister of Economy and Finances; 2005–2008	Succeeded by Álvaro García
Preceded by Rodolfo Nin Novoa	Vice President of Uruguay; 2010–2015	Succeeded by Raúl Fernando Sendic Rodríguez
Preceded by Mario Bergara	Minister of Economy and Finances; 2015–2020	Succeeded by Azucena Arbeleche
