= Martín C. Martínez =

Uruguayan lawyer and politician

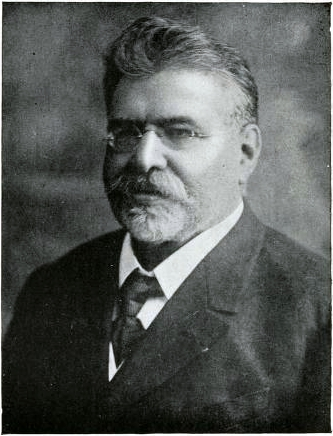
Martín C. Martínez

Martín Casimiro Martínez Fagalde, usually known as Martín C. Martínez (22 February 1859, Montevideo - 21 January 1946) was a Uruguayan lawyer and politician.

He was Minister of Finance from 1903 to 1904 and in 1916-1917. He took part in the Constituent Assembly that drafted the Uruguayan Constitution of 1918. Soon afterwards he was a member in the National Council of Administration (1919-1921).

He was successively member of three parties: Constitutional Party, National Party and Independent National Party.
