= 1920 Uruguayan general election =

General elections were held in Uruguay on 25 November 1920 to elect three members of the National Council of Administration and six of the 19 members of the Senate.

== Results ==
=== National Council of Administration ===
Party	Votes	%	Seats
Colorado Party	93,176	52.15	2
National Party	85,492	47.85	1
Total	178,668	100.00	3
Source: Bottinelli et al.

=== Senate ===
Party	Votes	%	Seats
Colorado Party	26,632	50.32	4
National Party	26,290	49.68	2
Total	52,922	100.00	6
Source: Bottinelli et al.
