= José Serrato =

President of Uruguay (1868–1960)

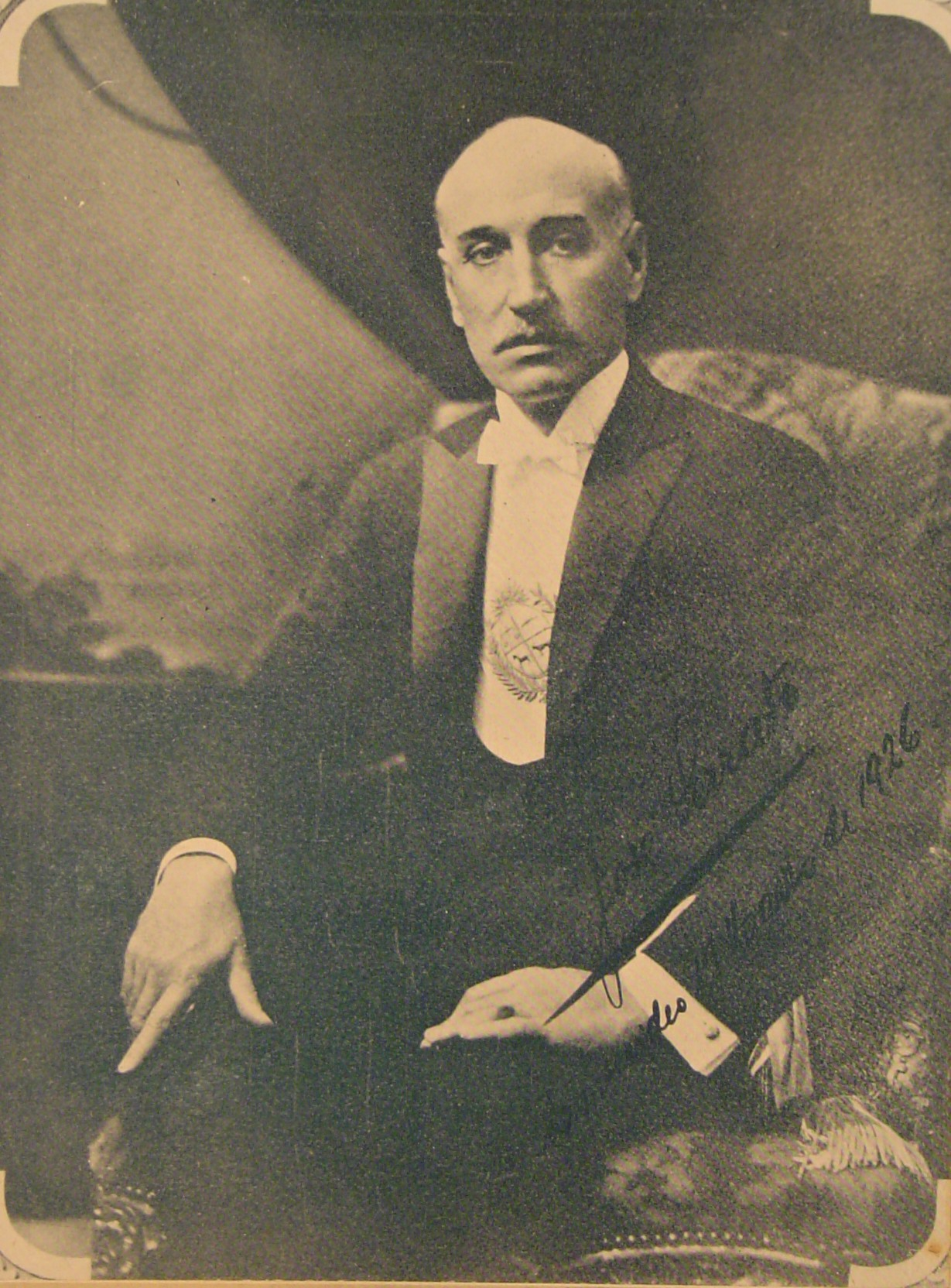

24th President of Uruguay
- In office March 1, 1923 – March 1, 1927
- Prime Minister: Julio María Sosa; Luis Alberto de Herrera
- Preceded by: Baltasar Brum
- Succeeded by: Juan Campisteguy

Personal details
- Born: September 30, 1868 Montevideo, Uruguay
- Died: September 7, 1960 (aged 91) Montevideo, Uruguay
- Party: Colorado Party
- Profession: Engineer, Economist

José Serrato (September 30, 1868 – September 7, 1960) was a politician who was elected President of Uruguay.

== Background ==
Serrato attended Elbio Fernández School. Serrato finished his studies as surveyor in Montevideo’s university in 1887, and later graduated as a civil engineer from that same university in 1892. Serrato went on to hold many important positions, both in the public service and in his profession. Amongst others, these included a member of the Administrative Board of the Capital, Secretary of the Harbour Commission of Montevideo, a member of the National Engineering Staff, Professor of Mathematics in the University, and Surveyor on the General Highway Board. He later became a prominent member of the Uruguayan Colorado Party which had long dominated the politics of the country. He was broadly identified with the policies of José Batlle y Ordóñez, but was regarded as not being strongly ideological, and thus able to work with others in the party with more polarized standpoints. He served as Minister of Finance from 1904 to 1907 and from 1911 to 1913. During Batlle’s second presidency, while serving as Minister of Finance, as noted by one study, “Among the questions which engaged his attention were the further improvement of the customs system, the revision of the real estate tax law, and the raising of funds for live-stock expositions, scholarships for students of agriculture, and the purchase of buildings for the legations of Uruguay in Argentina and Brazil.”

Serrato also served as Minister of the Department of Promotion during Batlle’s first presidency, during which time he promoted various improvements such as the erection of important public edifices, the building of highways, the sanitation of several cities including the port of Montevideo, the electrification of street railway systems, and the building of railways. He also served as President of the Uruguayan Mortgage Bank.

== President of Uruguay ==
Serrato served as President of Uruguay from 1923 to 1927, succeeding Baltasar Brum in that office. During his presidency, various reforms were carried out. In 1922, the National Council of Administration approved a regulation governing the importation, sale and manufacture of foodstuffs. A decree of March 1924 entitled, as noted by one study, “all employees of the police force and of the corps of firemen and detachments of firemen who have become incapacitated for further service from disability incident to their duties to a pension equal to two-thirds of their full active pay, available from the beginning of their incapacity incident to the service.” Provision was also made for dependents of those who had died. In December 1924, the National Council of Administration approved a regulation granting to sailors on national coastwise boats a 48-hour week, along with various rights to rest days and vacations.

In 1925, a minimum wage for public employees was sanctioned and a special social security system for political staff was introduced. That same year, a special social security programme was introduced for private and public sector bank clerks. In October 1925, a law laying down various conditions under which policemen were entitled to pensions was passed. New pension funds were also established, while the Public Utilities Pension Fund was extended to more people. In addition, a special lifetime pension was introduced in 1926 for all working women in commerce and industry who wished to leave their occupations to raise their children.

In 1925 he presided over the formal opening of the Palacio Legislativo, Montevideo.

He himself was succeeded by Juan Campisteguy.

== Post Presidency ==
Serrato was the president of Banco de la República Oriental del Uruguay from 1933 to 1934. He later served as Uruguayan Foreign Minister under President Juan José de Amézaga.

He died in 1960, more than 30 years after leaving the Presidency.

== See also ==
- Politics of Uruguay

== Notes ==
Political offices
Preceded by Baltasar Brum	President of Uruguay; 1923–1927	Succeeded by Juan Campisteguy
