= Juan Campisteguy =

Uruguayan soldier, lawyer and President of Uruguay

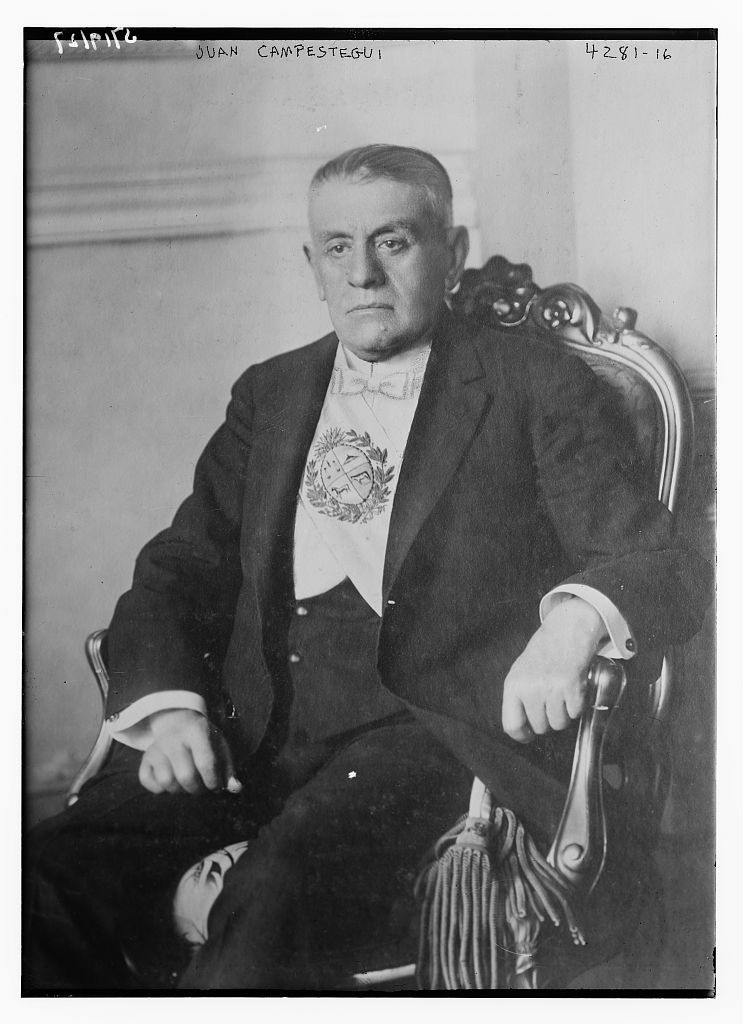
- Oxcoby in 1917

25th President of Uruguay
- In office 1 March 1927 – 1 March 1931
- Prime Minister: José Batlle y Ordóñez; Luis C. Caviglia; Baltasar Brum
- Preceded by: José Serrato
- Succeeded by: Gabriel Terra

Personal details
- Born: 7 September 1859 Montevideo, Uruguay
- Died: 4 September 1937 (aged 77) Montevideo, Uruguay
- Party: Colorado Party
- Occupation: Politician, lawyer, soldier

Juan Campisteguy Oxcoby (7 September 1859 – 4 September 1937) was a Uruguayan soldier, lawyer, and President of Uruguay (1927–1931).

== Biography ==
He was born in Montevideo.

Son of a soldier in the Great Siege of Montevideo, he participated in the Revolution of Quebracho.

Following his time in the army, entered the University in 1877; graduating as Bachelor of Science and Letters in 1881. During 1883 and later Campisteguy taught (without fees) classes in geography, mathematics, philosophy and history, while at the same time studying law at the University and graduating as Advocate in 1886. He later co-founded the newspaper El Día with José Batlle y Ordóñez. He was also elected deputy for Rio Negro during the administration of Tajes y Herro y Obes. Early in his parliamentary career, he served a member of the Financial Committee. In 1891, he inaugurated various projects connected with the currency, and in 1895 he fathered a plan for subsidizing a hospital in Rio Negro. He was re-elected member of the Financial Committee and in 1897 was appointed Secretary to the Treasury. A year later he was given the command of the Third Battalion of the National Guard, and in 1899 was nominated member of the Council of State and President of the Council of Administration of the Electric Light Company. This post was given to him due to the fact while serving as Secretary to the Treasury, he had purchased the entire stock of this company. This enabled the State to become its owner. In the same year he was again nominated deputy for Rio Negro. However, he was unable to accept this position as he was once again for the second time put in charge of the Treasury Department, but later resigned this office.

Campisteguy later served as Interior Minister from 1903 to 1904, and also as the President of the Senate of Uruguay in 1905.

Campisteguy was formerly a close political ally of the long-serving, liberal President of Uruguay José Batlle y Ordóñez, although he subsequently maintained a more independent political relationship within the Uruguayan Colorado Party.

He served as member of the National Council of Administration in 1921. He later served as President of Uruguay between 1927 and 1931. Ideologically, Campisteguy came to identify himself by the time of his presidency with Riverism; a conservative tendency of the Colorado Party. Despite his conservatism, a number of positive reforms were nevertheless carried out during Campestiguy’s presidency. In 1927, a law was approved by the National Administrative Council of Uruguay that provided for a minimum wage for those employed on public works. In 1928, a new public charity hospital was built by the government in the town of Lazcano, while the National Council of Administration authorized the Syphilis Prophylaxis Institute (as noted by one study) “to expend 18,000 pesos in the construction of a building in the city of Melo to house the dispensary for that locality.” An executive order made airplanes of the army medical corps available to the general public to use as ambulances in cases of extreme urgency.

In 1929, money was appropriated by the Government of Uruguay for the building of a hospital and two sanitariums for treating tuberculosis. According to one study, this represented “an important development of the extensive campaign now in progress for the prophylaxis and cure of this disease in Uruguay.” That same year, a law was passed that established Sunday as a day of mandatory rest for officials and owners of hairdressers and barbershops. Under a law of 25 June 1930, a minimum wage previously established on 18 November 1926 for port workers was extended to more people. Retirement benefits for women who had minor children and at least ten years of service were also extended to more people.

It was also while Campisteguy was president in 1927 that women first exercised the vote in a local election (The Plebiscite of Cerro Chato of 1927).

Campisteguy was succeeded as president by Gabriel Terra.

He died in Montevideo in 1937.

Political offices
Preceded by José Serrato	President of Uruguay; 1927–1931	Succeeded by Gabriel Terra
