= Ministry of Economy and Finance (Uruguay) =

Government ministry of Uruguay

- Ministerio de Economía y Finanzas

Ministry overview
- Formed: 8 March 1830
- Jurisdiction: Government of Uruguay
- Headquarters: Montevideo
- Minister responsible: Gabriel Oddone
- Website: Economics and Finance

The Ministry of Economy and Finance (Spanish: Ministerio de Economía y Finanzas) of Uruguay is a ministry of the Government of Uruguay that is responsible for administering, improving and strengthening the finance of Uruguay through certain competent bodies. This secretary of state is responsible for accounting for the profits of a country through imports and exports. It is also responsible for requesting and paying loans, and for administering the money that is spent on the different state distributions, for which the National Budget is presented to the Parliament.

== Creation ==
The Ministry of Economy and Finance (MEF) was originally established as the Ministry of Finance by Law of March 8, 1830, but on January 7, 1970 through Article 103, Law No. 13,835 the Ministry's name was changed to ministry of Economy and Finance by assigning it. In addition to the tasks of the previous one, all those who derive or serve as a means to carry out their main role of superior leadership of the national economic and financial policy.

== List of ministers of economy and finance of Uruguay ==
List of ministers of finance from 1830 to 1943:

Minister	Began	Ended
Gabriel Antonio Pereira	1830	1831
Román de Acha	1831	1831
Santiago Vázquez	1831	1833
Lucas José Obes	1833	1835
Juan María Pérez	1835	1838
Francisco Joaquín Muñoz	1838	1838
Santiago Vázquez	1838	1839
Francisco Joaquín Muñoz	1839	1839
Alejandro Chucarro	1839	1841
José de Béjar	1841	1843
Andrés Lamas	1843	1844
Santiago Sayago	1844	1847
José de Béjar	1847	1852
Manuel Herrera y Obes	1852	1853
Santiago Sayago	1853	1853
José Zubillaga	1853	1856
Lorenzo Batlle	1856	1857
Doroteo García	1857	1858
Francisco Lecocq	1858	1859
Cristóbal Salvañach	1859	1860
Tomás Villalba	1860	1861
Antonio Pérez	1861	1864
Eustaquio Tomé	1864	1865
Juan Ramón Gómez	1865	1866
Antonio María Márquez	1866	1868
Emeterio Regúnaga	1868	1868
Pedro Bustamante y García	1868	1868
Daniel Zorrilla	1868	1869
Alejandro Magariños Cervantes	1869	1869
Duncan Stewart	1869	1872
Ernesto Velazco	1872	1874
Pedro Bustamante y García	1874	1875
Cayetano Álvarez	1875	1875
José Cándido Bustamante	1875	1875
Juan Lindolfo Cuestas	1875	1876
Juan Andrés Vázquez	1876	1877
José María de Nava	1877	1879
Aurelio Berro	1879	1880
Juan Peñalva	1880	1880
Juan Lindolfo Cuestas	1880	1882
José Ladislao Terra	1882	1886
Antonio María Márquez	1886	1889
Jacobo Adrián Varela	1889	1889
Carlos María de Pena	1890	1891
Carlos María Ramírez	1891	1892
Alcides Montero	1892	1894
Federico Vidiella	1894	1899
Juan Campisteguy	1899	1899
Anacleto Dufort y Álvarez	1899	1901
Diego Pons	1901	1902
Martín C. Martínez	1903	1904
José Serrato	1904	1907
Eugenio Magdalena	1907	1907
Blas Vidal	1907	1911
José Serrato	1911	1913
Pedro Cosio	1913	1916
Martín C. Martínez	1916	1916
Federico Vidiella	1916	1919
Ricardo Vecino	1919	1923
Ricardo Cosio	1923	1927
Daniel Blanco Acevedo	1927	1927
Eduardo Acevedo Álvarez	1927	1927
Daniel Blanco Acevedo	1927	1929
Ricardo Vecino	1929	1931
Eduardo Acevedo Álvarez	1931	1933
Pedro Manini Ríos	1933	1933
Pedro Cosio	1933	1934
César Charlone	1934	1938
Ricardo Vecino	1938	1940
César Charlone	1940	1943

List of ministers of economy and finance since 1943:

Minister	Party	Began	Ended
Ricardo Cossio	Colorado Party	1943	1945
Héctor Álvarez Cina	Colorado Party	1946	1946
Ledo Arroyo Torres	Colorado Party	1947	1949
Nilo R. Berchesi	Colorado Party	1950	1950
Héctor Álvarez Cina	Colorado Party	1951	1951
Eduardo Acevedo Álvarez	Colorado Party	1952	1954
Armando Malet	Colorado Party	1955	1956
Ledo Arroyo Torres	Colorado Party	1956	1957
Amílcar Vasconcellos	Colorado Party	1957	1958
Juan Eduardo Azzini	National Party	1959	1962
Salvador Ferrer Serra	National Party	1963	1963
Raúl Ybarra San Martín	National Party	1964	1964
Daniel H. Martins	National Party	1965	1965
Dardo Ortiz	National Party	1966	1967
Amílcar Vasconcellos	Colorado Party	1967	1967
Carlos Végh Garzón	Colorado Party	1967	1967
César Charlone	Colorado Party	1967	1970
Armando Malet	Colorado Party	1970	1970
César Charlone	Colorado Party	1970	1971
Carlos M. Fleitas	Colorado Party	1971	1972
Francisco Forteza	Colorado Party	1972	1972
Moisés Cohen Berro	Colorado Party	1972	1973
Manuel Pazos¹	Colorado Party	1973	1974
Alejandro Végh Villegas¹	Colorado Party	1974	1976
Valentín Arismendi¹	Without known affiliation	1976	1982
Walter Lusiardo Aznárez¹	Without known affiliation	1982	1983
Alejandro Végh Villegas¹	Colorado Party	1983	1985
Ricardo Zerbino	Colorado Party	1985	1990
Enrique Braga	National Party	1990	1992
Ignacio de Posadas	National Party	1992	1995
Daniel H. Martins	National Party	1995	1995
Luis Mosca	Colorado Party	1995	2000
Alberto Bensión	Colorado Party	2000	2002
Alejandro Atchugarry	Colorado Party	2002	2003
Isaac Alfie	Colorado Party	2003	2005
Danilo Astori	Broad Front	2005	2008
Álvaro García Rodríguez	Broad Front	2008	2010
Fernando Lorenzo	Broad Front	2010	2013
Mario Bergara	Broad Front	2013	2015
Danilo Astori	Broad Front	2015	2020
Azucena Arbeleche	National Party	2020	2025
Gabriel Oddone	Broad Front	2025	present

¹ Ministers of the Military-Civic government (1973-1985).
