= Office of Planning and Budget =

Government agency in Uruguay

- Oficina de Planeamiento y Presupuesto
- Abbreviation: OPP
- Formation: 1 March 1967
- Type: Government agency
- Purpose: Advise the Executive Power of Uruguay in the formulation of plans, programs and policies, and define the government's economic and social strategy
- Headquarters: Executive Tower, Montevideo
- Region served: Uruguay
- Director: Rodrigo Arim
- Deputy Director: Fernando Polgar
- Website: opp.gub.uy

The Office of Planning and Budget (OPP) (Spanish: Oficina de Planeamiento y Presupuesto) is the agency responsible for advising the Government of Uruguay in the formulation of national and departmental plans, programs and policies as well as in the definition of the Government's economic and social strategy.

Headquartered in the Executive Tower, Montevideo, its head is appointed by the President of the Republic at the beginning of the mandate. The position has the same requirements as that of Cabinet Minister and, in practice, has a similar hierarchy. He usually participates in the meetings of the Council of Ministers. The current head is Rodrigo Arim, who was assigned into the position by Yamandú Orsi in March 1, 2025.

== History ==
=== 1960–1967 ===
By decree of the National Council of Government of January 27, 1960, the Investment and Economic Development Commission was created. This commission was chaired by the Minister of Finance and also made up of the Ministers of Public Works, Industry and Labor, Livestock and Agriculture, the General Accountant of the Nation, the Director of Public Credit and a Director of the Bank of the Oriental Republic of Uruguay.

Its functions were to formulate organic plans for economic development; project and seek its internal and external financing; coordinate all efforts to increase national productivity; and monitor the implementation of approved plans. It operated between January 27, 1960 and February 28, 1967, its Technical Secretary was the economist Enrique Iglesias.

=== 1967–1976 ===
In 1967, the constitutional reform approved in the plebiscite of November 27, 1966 came into effect. Article 230 of the new Constitution. This established: "There will be a Planning and Budget Office that will report directly to the Presidency of the Republic. It will be directed by a Commission made up of representatives of the Ministers related to development and by a Director appointed by the President of the Republic who will preside over it".

=== 1976–1985 ===
In the civic-military dictatorship, by the so-called Institutional Act No. 3 (articles 3 and 4), of September 1, 1976, the Planning, Coordination and Dissemination Secretariat was created, replacing the Office of Planning and Budget.

=== 1985–present ===
With the restoration of institutional normality, on March 1, 1985, the Planning Secretary was null and void. Decree No. 96/985 organized and established its tasks, objectives, and organizational structure.

== Functions ==
The Office of Planning and Budget advises the Executive Power on:

- The definition of the Government's economic and social strategy;
- The formulation of national and departmental plans, programs and policies consistent with it;
- The elaboration and evaluation based on performance indicators of the National Budget and Accountability projects;
- The analysis and evaluation of the budgets, investment plans and rates of the organizations of article 221 of the Constitution of the Republic;
- The conduction of the processes of modernization and reform of the State; and
- The planning of decentralization policies.
