= Colección de Clásicos Uruguayos =

Uruguayan book series

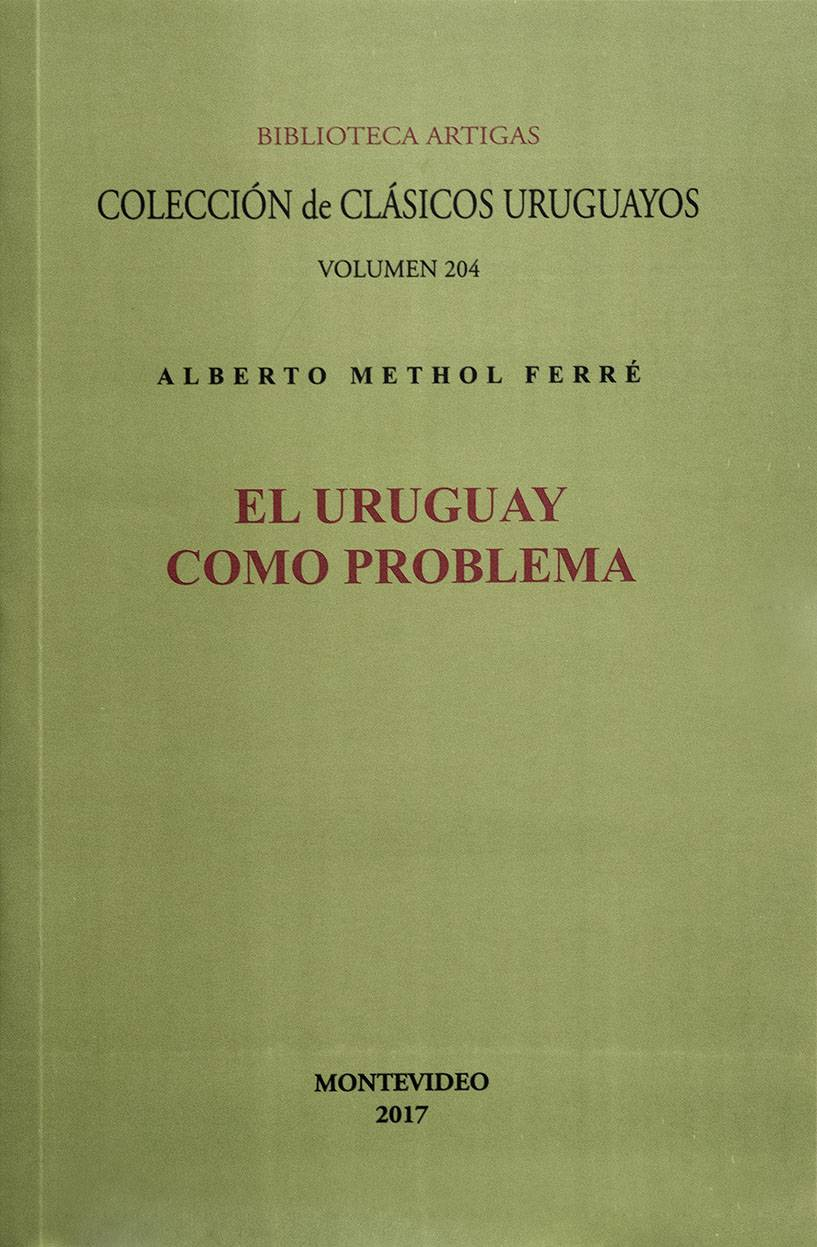
El Uruguay como problema (Biblioteca Artigas - Colección de Clásicos Uruguayos, vol. 204)

The Colección de Clásicos Uruguayos (“Collection of Uruguayan Classics”), also Biblioteca Artigas (“Artigas Library”) is a state-published series founded in 1950 to honor José Gervasio Artigas (1764-1850) on the centenary of his death, with publications beginning in 1953. It includes literary, historical, philosophical, and social works, each with an introductory study, and has shaped Uruguay’s national literary canon. Publication was irregular. The series is overseen by a commission composed of the Undersecretary of the Ministry of Education and Culture, and the directors of the National Library (Biblioteca Nacional), the National Historical Museum (Museo Histórico Nacional), and the National Archives of Uruguay (Archivo General de la Nación).

== Titles ==
Vol.	Title	Author	Year
1	Artigas	Carlos María Ramírez	1953
2	Fermentario	Carlos Vaz Ferreira	1953
3	El terruño y Primitivo	Carlos Reyles	1953
4	Ismael	Eduardo Acevedo Díaz	1953
5	Sobre los problemas sociales	Carlos Vaz Ferreira	1953
6	Sobre la propiedad de la tierra	Carlos Vaz Ferreira	1953
7	Descripción geográfica del territorio de la República Oriental del Uruguay. Tomo I. Acompañado de observaciones geológicas y cuadros estadísticos	José María Reyes	1953
8	Descripción geográfica del territorio de la República Oriental del Uruguay. Tomo II. Acompañado de observaciones geológicas y cuadros estadísticos	José María Reyes	1953
9	Estudios literarios	Francisco Bauzá	1953
10	Artículos	Sansón Carrasco	1953
11	Estudios constitucionales	Francisco Bauzá	1953
12	Estudios filosóficos	José Pedro Massera	1954
13	Paja brava	El Viejo Pancho	1954
14	Doñarramona	José Pedro Bellán	1954
15	Soledad y El combate de la tapera	Eduardo Acevedo Díaz	1954
16	Todos los cantos	Álvaro Armando Vasseur	1955
17	Narraciones	Manuel Bernárdez	1955
18	Tabaré	Juan Zorrilla de San Martín	1956
19	Gaucha	Javier de Viana	1956
20	La isla de los cánticos	María Eugenia Vaz Ferreira	1956
21	Motivos de Proteo. Tomo I	José Enrique Rodó	1957
22	Motivos de Proteo. Tomo II	José Enrique Rodó	1957
23	Montevideo antiguo. Tomo I. Tradiciones y recuerdos	Isidoro de María	1957
24	Montevideo antiguo. Tomo II. Tradiciones y recuerdos	Isidoro de María	1957
25	Vocabulario rioplatense razonado. Tomo I	Daniel Granada	1957
26	Vocabulario rioplatense razonado. Tomo II	Daniel Granada	1957
27	Diario de viaje. Tomo I	Francisco Javier de Viana	1957
28	Diario de viaje. Tomo II	Francisco Javier de Viana	1958
29	Diario de la campaña de las Fuerzas Aliadas contra el Paraguay. Tomo I	León de Palleja	1960
30	Diario de la campaña de las Fuerzas Aliadas contra el Paraguay. Tomo II	León de Palleja	1960
31	Arte, estética ideal. Tomo I	Pedro Figari	1960
32	Arte, estética ideal. Tomo II	Pedro Figari	1960
33	Arte, estética ideal. Tomo III	Pedro Figari	1960
34	Nativos	Santiago Maciel	1961
35	Estudios históricos, políticos y sociales sobre el Río de la Plata. Tomo I	Alejandro Magariños Cervantes	1963
36	Estudios históricos, políticos y sociales sobre el Río de la Plata. Tomo II	Alejandro Magariños Cervantes	1963
37	La epopeya de Artigas. Tomo I	Juan Zorrilla de San Martín	1963
38	La epopeya de Artigas. Tomo II	Juan Zorrilla de San Martín	1963
39	La epopeya de Artigas. Tomo III	Juan Zorrilla de San Martín	1963
40	La epopeya de Artigas. Tomo IV	Juan Zorrilla de San Martín	1963
41	La epopeya de Artigas. Tomo V	Juan Zorrilla de San Martín	1963
42	Las lenguas de diamante	Juana de Ibarbourou	1963
43	Teseo. Los problemas del arte	Eduardo Dieste	1964
44	Ariel. Liberalismo y jacobinismo	José Enrique Rodó	1964
45	Pasar…	Mateo Magariños Solsona	1964
46	Las Instrucciones del Año XIII. Tomo I	Héctor Miranda	1964
47	Las Instrucciones el Año XIII. Tomo II	Héctor Miranda	1964
48	Ante la nueva constitución	Martín C. Martínez	1964
49	Obras pedagógicas. Tomo I. La educación del pueblo	José Pedro Varela	1964
50	Obras pedagógicas. Tomo II. La educación del pueblo	José Pedro Varela	1964
51	Obras pedagógicas. Tomo I. La legislación escolar	José Pedro Varela	1964
52	Obras pedagógicas. Tomo II. La legislación escolar	José Pedro Varela	1964
53	Nativa	Eduardo Acevedo Díaz	1964
54	Grito de gloria	Eduardo Acevedo Díaz	1964
55	Selección de poesías	Carlos Roxlo	1964
56	Los tres gauchos orientales	Antonio Lussich	1964
57	Versos criollos	Elías Regules	1965
58	Motivos de crítica. Tomo I	Osvaldo Crispo Acosta "Lauxar"	1965
59	Motivos de crítica. Tomo II	Osvaldo Crispo Acosta "Lauxar"	1965
60	Motivos de crítica. Tomo III	Osvaldo Crispo Acosta "Lauxar"	1965
61	Motivos de crítica. Tomo IV	Osvaldo Crispo Acosta "Lauxar"	1965
62	Beba	Carlos Reyles	1965
63	Lanza y sable	Eduardo Acevedo Díaz	1965
64	Conferencias y discursos. Tomo I	Juan Zorrilla de San Martín	1965
65	Conferencias y discursos. Tomo II	Juan Zorrilla de San Martín	1965
66	Conferencias y discursos. Tomo III	Juan Zorrilla de San Martín	1965
67	El destino nacional y la universidad. Tomo I. Polémica	José Pedro Varela, Carlos María Ramírez	1965
68	El destino nacional y la universidad. Tomo II. Polémica	José Pedro Varela, Carlos María Ramírez	1965
69	Antología	Delmira Agustini	1965
70	Selección de cuentos. Tomo I	Javier de Viana	1965
71	Selección de cuentos. Tomo II	Javier de Viana	1965
72	Historia del territorio oriental del Uruguay. Tomo I	Juan M. de la Sota	1965
73	Historia del territorio oriental del Uruguay. Tomo II	Juan M. de la Sota	1965
74	Cuentos	Benjamín Fernández y Medina	1965
75	La recuperación del objeto. Tomo I	Joaquín Torres García	1965
76	La recuperación del objeto. Tomo II	Joaquín Torres García	1965
77	Deportación a La Habana en la barca «Puig». Historia de un atentado célebre	Agustín de Vedia	1965
78	Escritos sociológicos. 1881-1885	Martín C. Martínez	1965
79	El mirador de Próspero. Tomo I	José Enrique Rodó	1965
80	El mirador de Próspero. Tomo II	José Enrique Rodó	1965
81	Educación y arte	Pedro Figari	1965
82	Antología	Francisco Acuña de Figueroa	1965
83	Selección de poesías	Romildo Risso	1965
84	Ensayos. Tomo I	Carlos Reyles	1965
85	Ensayos. Tomo II	Carlos Reyles	1965
86	Ensayos. Tomo III	Carlos Reyles	1965
87	Teatro completo. Tomo I	Ernesto Herrera	1965
88	Teatro completo. Tomo II	Ernesto Herrera	1965
89	Los modernistas. Tomo I	Víctor Pérez Petit	1965
90	Los modernistas. Tomo II	Víctor Pérez Petit	1965
91	Las mujeres de Shakespeare	Luis Melián Lafinur	1965
92	Selección de escritos	Dámaso Antonio Larrañaga	1965
93	Escritos filosóficos	Prudencio Vázquez y Vega	1965
94	La raza de Caín	Carlos Reyles	1965
95	Historia de la dominación española en el Uruguay. Tomo I	Francisco Bauzá	1965
96	Historia de la dominación española en el Uruguay. Tomo II	Francisco Bauzá	1965
97	Historia de la dominación española en el Uruguay. Tomo III	Francisco Bauzá	1965
98	Historia de la dominación española en el Uruguay. Tomo IV	Francisco Bauzá	1965
99	Historia de la dominación española en el Uruguay. Tomo V	Francisco Bauzá	1965
100	Historia de la dominación española en el Uruguay. Tomo VI	Francisco Bauzá	1965
101	Selección de cuentos. Tomo I	Horacio Quiroga	1966
102	Selección de cuentos. Tomo II	Horacio Quiroga	1966
103	Conferencias de derecho constitucional	Carlos María Ramírez	1966
104	Antología	Fernán Silva Valdés	1966
105	Selección de cuentos. Tomo I	Yamandú Rodríguez	1966
106	Selección de cuentos. Tomo II	Yamandú Rodríguez	1966
107	Crónicas de un crimen	Justino Zavala Muniz	1966
108	Anecdotario del uruguayo Santiago Marcos	Ramón Píriz Coelho	1966
109	Lauracha	Otto Miguel Cione	1966
110	El caudillismo y la revolución americana. Polémica	Manuel Herrera y Obes y Bernardo Prudencio Berro	1966
111	Escritos selectos	Bernardo Prudencio Berro	1966
112	Estudios históricos	Lorenzo Barbagelata	1966
113	Obras poéticas	Julio Herrera y Reissig	1966
114	Conferencias sobre derecho natural. Como introducción al curso de Derecho de Gentes	Gregorio Pérez Gomar	1966
115	Curso elemental de Derecho de Gentes. Tomo I	Gregorio Pérez Gomar	1966
116	Curso elemental de Derecho de Gentes. Tomo II	Gregorio Pérez Gomar	1966
117	Raza ciega y otros cuentos	Francisco Espínola	1967
118	Dos ensayos constitucionales	Juan Andrés Ramírez	1967
119	Cartas íntimas	Rafael Barrett	1967
120	Praderas soleadas y otros poemas	Andrés Héctor Lerena Acevedo	1967
121	Teatro. Tomo I	Florencio Sánchez	1967
122	Teatro. Tomo II	Florencio Sánchez	1967
123	Antología	Juana de Ibarbourou	1967
124	Crítica y arte. Tierra española. Visiones de Italia	Gustavo Gallinal	1967
125	Letras uruguayas	Gustavo Gallinal	1967
126	Historia de un amor turbio	Horacio Quiroga	1968
127	Selección de prosas. Tomo I	Pedro Leandro Ipuche	1968
128	Selección de prosas. Tomo II	Pedro Leandro Ipuche	1968
129	Memorias	César Díaz	1968
130	Selección de escritos. Crónicas históricas: 1787-1814	José Manuel Pérez Castellano	1968
131	Selección de escritos. Tomo I. Observación sobre agricultura	José Manuel Pérez Castellano	1968
132	Selección de escritos. Tomo II. Observación sobre agricultura	José Manuel Pérez Castellano	1968
133	Paráfrasis	Roberto Sienra	1968
134	Poética y plástica. Tomo I	Emilio Oribe	1968
135	Poética y plástica. Tomo II	Emilio Oribe	1968
136	Un panorama del espíritu. Tomo I. El «Ariel» de Rodó	José G. Antuña	1969
137	Un panorama del espíritu. Tomo II. El «Ariel» de Rodó	José G. Antuña	1969
138	Selección de cuentos	Adolfo Montiel Ballesteros	1970
139	Antología de poetas modernistas menores		1971
140	Estudios sociales y económicos. Tomo I	Francisco Bauzá	1972
141	Estudios sociales y económicos. Tomo II	Francisco Bauzá	1972
142	Selección de discursos. Tomo I	Francisco Acuña de Figueroa	1972
143	Selección de discursos. Tomo II	Francisco Acuña de Figueroa	1972
144	Selección de discursos. Tomo III	Francisco Soca	1972
145	La independencia nacional. Tomo I	Francisco Bauzá y otros	1975
146	La independencia nacional. Tomo II	Pablo Blanco Acevedo	1975
147	Época colonial. La Compañía de Jesús en Montevideo	Carlos Ferrés	1975
148	La agricultura colonial	Mariano B. Berro	1975
149	El gobierno colonial en el Uruguay y los orígenes de la nacionalidad. Tomo I	Pablo Blanco Acevedo	1975
150	El gobierno colonial en el Uruguay y los orígenes de la nacionalidad. Tomo II	Pablo Blanco Acevedo	1975
151	La cruzada de los Treinta y Tres	Luis Arcos Ferrand	1976
152	Páginas de Historia	Carlos María Ramírez	1978
153	El narrador gaucho. Novela en cuentos. Selección de cuentos	Valentín García Saiz	1978
154	Ensayos. Tomo I. El sermón de la paz	Juan Zorrilla de San Martín	1978
155	Ensayos. Tomo II. El libro de Ruth	Juan Zorrilla de San Martín	1978
156	Ensayos. Tomo III. Huerto cerrado	Juan Zorrilla de San Martín	1978
157	Diario histórico del sitio de Montevideo en los años 1812-13-14. Tomo I	Francisco Acuña de Figueroa	1978
158	Diario histórico del sitio de Montevideo en los años 1812-13-14. Tomo II	Francisco Acuña de Figueroa	1978
159	El Parnaso oriental o guirnalda poética de la República Uruguaya. Tomo I	Luciano Lira	1981
160	El Parnaso oriental o guirnalda poética de la República Uruguaya. Tomo II	Luciano Lira	1981
161	El Parnaso oriental o guirnalda poética de la República Uruguaya. Tomo III	Luciano Lira	1981
162	El Uruguay entre dos siglos	Mario Falcao Espalter	1983
163	Purificación. Sede del Protectorado de los Pueblos Libres. 1815-1818	Juan Antonio Rebella	1981
164	La leyenda patria	Juan Zorrilla de San Martín	1979
165	Antología. Tomo I	Carlos Sabat Ercasty	1982
166	Antología. Tomo II	Carlos Sabat Ercasty	1982
167	Tacuruses	Serafín J. García	1985
168	Antología. Tomo I	Serafín J. García	1987
169	Antología. Tomo II	Serafín J. García	s/d
170	Obra completa	Bartolomé Hidalgo	1986
171	De la leyenda negra al culto artiguista	Juan E. Pivel Devoto	2004
172	La carreta	Enrique Amorim	2004
173	Cuentos selectos	Milton Stelardo	1999
174	El país secreto	María de Montserrat	1999
175	Sombras sobre la tierra	Francisco Espínola	2001
176	Espiritualismo y positivismo en el Uruguay	Arturo Ardao	2008
177	Aviso a la población	Clara Silva	2008
178	Los fuegos de San Telmo	José Pedro Díaz	2008
179	El impulso y su freno	Carlos Real de Azúa	2009
180	Escritos	Gervasio Guillot Muñoz	2009
181	Tierra en la boca	Carlos Martínez Moreno	2009
182	Un cuento con un pozo y otros escritos	Mario Arregui	2009
183	La vida breve	Juan Carlos Onetti	2009
184	Tres libros de poesía	Juan Cunha	2010
185	Prosa urgente	Florencio Sánchez	2011
186	Los Molles	Santiago Dossetti	2011
187	Felicidad y otras tristezas	María Inés Silva Vila	2011
188	El río y otros problemas	Amanda Berenguer	2011
189	Colección de poetas del Río de la Plata	Andrés Lamas y otros	2011
190	Prosa fundamental, prosa desconocida, discursos. Tomo I	Julio Herrera y Reissig	2011
191	Prosa fundamental, prosa desconocida, correspondencia. Tomo II	Julio Herrera y Reissig	2011
192	Crónicas de la naturaleza	Rafael Barrett	2012
193	Campo secreto	Carlos Rodríguez Pintos	2012
194	Polémicas	Joaquín Torres García	2014
195	Raíz al sol	Eliseo Salvador Porta	2014
196	Textos breves	Lauro Ayestarán	2014
197	Dialectología general e hispanoamericana	José Pedro Rona	2014
198	Las ínsulas extrañas. Canto desierto y antología poética	Esther de Cáceres	2015
199	El arreglo de los campos	María Inés Moraes	2015
200	Nadie encendía las lámparas	Felisberto Hernández	2016
201	En la sierra maestra y otros reportajes	Carlos María Gutiérrez	2017
202	Febrero amargo	Amílcar Vasconcellos	2017
203	Tierra y tiempo	Juan José Morosoli	2017
204	El Uruguay como problema	Alberto Methol Ferré	2017
205	Escritos europeos	José Enrique Rodó	2017
206	Pantheos	Carlos Sabat Ercasty	2017
207	Protestas armadas (Relatos y otras páginas, 1870-1904)	Eduardo Acevedo Díaz	2018
208	De la poesía y los poetas	Idea Vilariño	2018
209	Crítica activa	Rubén Cotelo	2018
210	El léxico de los uruguayos y otros estudios	Adolfo Berro García	2018
211	Ensayo y memoria	Emir Rodríguez Monegal	2019
212	Actuales narradores hispanoamericanos (Diálogos de los 60)	Domingo Luis Bordoli y Heber Raviolo	2019
213	Varias historias	José Monegal	2019
214	La libertad política	Justino Jiménez de Aréchaga	2020
215	Uruguay: ¿provincia o nación?	Roberto Ares Pons	2020
216	Trabajos filosóficos	Juan Llambías de Azevedo	2020
217	La tregua	Mario Benedetti	2020
218	Cuentos completos	Julio C. da Rosa	2021
219	Recorrido por un país devastado: Juan Francisco Giró (1852)	Florentino Castellanos	2023
220	La Guerra de los Charrúas en la Banda Oriental	Eduardo F. Acosta y Lara	2024
221	La Colina del Pájaro Rojo	Emilio Oribe	2024
Fuera de Serie I	Diario de Historia Natural (1808-1814)	Dámaso Antonio Larrañaga	2015
Fuera de Serie II	Diario de Historia Natural (1813-1824)	Dámaso Antonio Larrañaga	2017
Fuera de Serie III	Cajón de Sastre	José Manuel Pérez Castellano	2021

== See also ==
- Archivo Artigas (Spanish)
