= Orosmán Moratorio =

Uruguayan poet and writer

Orosmán Moratorio (1852–1898) was an Uruguayan poet and writer.

Moratorio was one of several Uruguayan authors who flourished in Buenos Aires during the period of realism in rioplatense theater at the turn of the 20th century, others being Ismael Cortinas (1884–1940), Edmundo Bianchi (1880–1965) and Otto Miguel Cione (1875–1945). A member of the Gaucho literature movement, in 1895 he helped Alcides de María establish "El Fogón", one of the most important regional literary magazines of their time. Several referents of the gauchesco style collaborated, among others: Elías Regules, Antonio Lussich, José Alonso y Trelles, Javier de Viana, Juan Escayola, Martiniano Leguizamón and Domingo Lombardi. Soon afterwards he established another similar magazine, "El Ombú", a short-lived experiment in 1896.

== Literary work ==
- Luisa, or, Village bells: one-act comedy written expressly for Talia DN Society (1878)
- Mary (1881)
- Patria and love (1885)
- Juan Soldao (1894)
- Great Expectations (1895)

== Sources ==
- Cortés, Eladio; Barrea-Marlys, Mirta (2003), Encyclopedia of Latin American Theater, Greenwood Publishing Group, ISBN 978-0-313-29041-1
