= Aurelio Lucchini =

Aurelio Lucchini (died 1989) was a Uruguayan architect and architectural historian.

From March 1983 till his death, he was a member of the Academia Nacional de Letras del Uruguay.

== Selected works ==
- Cronología comparada de la historia del Uruguay 1830-1945, with Blanca París de Oddone, Carlos Real de Azúa, Otilia Muras, Arturo Ardao, Washington Buño, Lauro Ayestarán, and Susana Salgado; Montevideo, 1966.
- Ideas y formas en la arquitectura nacional. Colección Nuestra Tierra, Vol. 6, Montevideo, 1969.
- Julio Vilamajó. Su arquitectura, with the collaboration of Mariano Arana; FArq, IHA, Montevideo, 1970.
- El Concepto de Arquitectura y su traducción a formas en el territorio que hoy pertenece a Uruguay. Universidad de la República, Montevideo, 1986.
