= Javier de Viana (disambiguation) =

Javier de Viana may refer to

- Javier de Viana, a populated centre in the Artigas Department of northern Uruguay
- Javier de Viana (author) (1868–1926), Uruguayan writer
- Francisco Javier de Viana (1764–1820), Argentine sailor, soldier, and political figure
