= Massimo Borghesi =

Massimo Borghesi (born 1951) is an Italian philosopher.

== Biography ==
Massimo Borghesi graduated from the University of Perugia in 1974. His dissertation focused on an aspect of Hegelian thought, specifically Hegel's understanding of the figure of Jesus Christ, particularly in his Theologische Jugendschriften, and the development of his thought in later years. His dissertation was supervised by the Italian thinker Armando Rigobello. After conducting research at the University of Tor Vergata, he was appointed associate professor of the History of Moral Philosophy at the University of Salento. He later taught at the Pontifical University of Saint Bonaventure, the Pontifical Urban University, and, until 2022, at the University of Perugia.

He is a member of the editorial board of several Italian philosophical journals, including Quaderni leif, Studium, Atlantide, and the Nuovo giornale di filosofia della religione.

In 2013, he was awarded the Capri-San Michele Prize, and in 2023, the Lucio Colletti Prize.

== Thought ==
The Catholic philosopher Massimo Borghesi focuses primarily on the rampant atheism of our time since the 20th century and the concept of secularization, which originated in the Enlightenment. He has analyzed and defended the pontificate of Pope Francis against attacks from those who deemed him unsuitable due to alleged ignorance and a lack of theological training, particularly in comparison to his predecessor, Pope Benedict XVI, who is considered one of the greatest theologians of our time.

He saw in the Argentinian Pope a profound and complex thought, based primarily on the concept of coincidentia oppositorum, a theory developed several centuries earlier by the German Cardinal Nicholas of Cusa; this polarity, according to Borghesi, represents the way in which the 266th Pope of the Catholic Church understands the Church itself, by placing it between two extreme poles reconciled by the intervention of divine providence, just as in Hegelian doctrine, the Aufhebung made it possible to overcome the dialectical moments of thesis and antithesis within the historical process and thus justify the rationality of reality, even the horrors of the Shoah and Action T4. According to Borghesi, the theory of polarity of Guardini’s origin, as well as the immaterial encounter with the writings of Alberto Methol Ferré, Ignatius of Loyola, Gaston Fessard, Henry-Marie de Lubac, Amelia Podetti, and other thinkers who engaged deeply with the work of the Church and Catholicism, were crucial for the spiritual development of Jorge Mario Bergoglio and for the elaboration of this doctrine.

== Works translated in English ==
- Massimo Borghesi (2018), The Mind of Pope Francis: Jorge Mario Bergoglio’s Intellectual Journey, translated by Barry Hudock, foreword by Guzmán Carriquiry Lecour, Liturgical Press, Collegeville, ISBN 978-0-8146-8790-1.
- Massimo Borghesi (2021), Catholic Discordance: Neoconservatism vs. the Field Hospital Church of Pope Francis, translated by Barry Hudock, Liturgical Press, Collegeville, ISBN 978-0-8146-6735-4.
