= Carlos Vaz Ferreira =

Uruguayan philosopher, lawyer, writer and academic

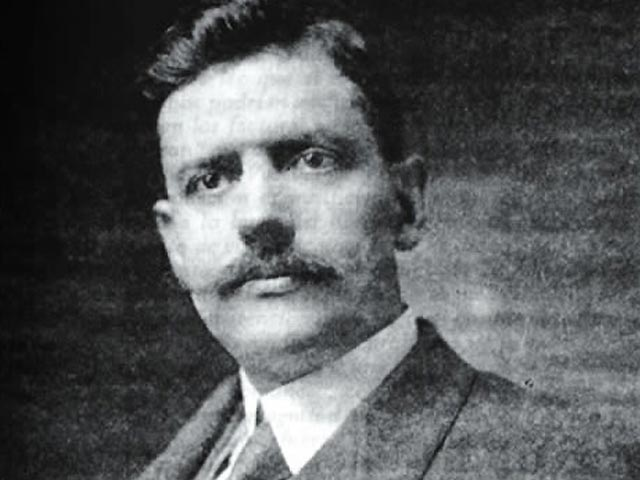
- Carlos Vaz Ferreira
- Born: Carlos Vaz Ferreira; October 15, 1872; Uruguay, Montevideo
- Died: January 3, 1958 (aged 85); Uruguay, Montevideo
- Occupations: Writer, philosopher

Carlos Vaz Ferreira (October 15, 1872 – January 3, 1958) was a Uruguayan philosopher, lawyer, writer, and academic. Influenced by John Stuart Mill and Herbert Spencer, he is notable for introducing liberal, pluralistic political values and pragmatic philosophical concepts to South American society.

== Life ==
Vaz Ferreira was born in Montevideo. His younger sister was the poet María Eugenia Vaz Ferreira. His first published work, in 1897, was "Curso expositivo de Psicología elemental" ("Lecture Course on Elemental Psychology"). The same year, he began lecturing in philosophy at the University of the Republic. His second work, published in 1898, was a book on formal logic.

In 1903 he was licensed as an attorney.

In 1905 he published "Ideas y Observaciones" ("Ideas and Observations"), a collection of both new and previously published works. The collection's length led the author to publish it in two separate volumes.

Vaz Ferreira's most important works were published between 1905 and 1910. In 1907 he published "Problemas de la Libertad" ("Problems of Liberty"), in 1908 "Conocimiento y Acción" ("Knowledge and Action") and "Moral para Intelectuales" ("Morals for Intellectuals"), in 1909 "El Pragmatismo" ("Pragmatism"), and in 1910 "Lógica Viva" ("Living Logic").

In 1913 he was named maestro de conferencias (a position somewhat analogous to associate professor) at the University of the Republic.

In 1918 he published "Lecciones sobre pedagogía" ("Readings on Pedagogy") and "Sobre la propiedad de la tierra" ("On the Ownership of land"), and in 1922 "Sobre los problemas sociales" ("On Social Problems"). "Sobre el feminismo" ("On Feminism"), one of the earliest treatments of feminism in Latin American academia, appeared in 1933. "Fermentario" ("Fermentative") appeared in 1938. In 1940 he edited "La actual crisis del mundo" ("The Current World Crisis").

Vaz Ferreira served as vice-chancellor of the University of the Republic between 1928 and 1931 and between 1935 and 1941. In 1931 he was forced to leave the position due to health problems, but was unanimously reelected in 1935. During this period, he was well known for his outspoken defense of academic autonomy against the dictatorship of Gabriel Terra.

One of Vaz Ferreira's long-standing academic goals was achieved in 1945 with the foundation of the Faculty of Humanities and Education Sciences. He served as its dean until 1958.

== Philosophy ==
=== Influences ===
Vaz Fererira's philosophical views were formed under the influence of positivism, which was dominant in Uruguay as well as in Europe during the Fin de siècle period. He was particularly influenced by the philosophy of Herbert Spencer and John Stuart Mill.

Vaz Ferreira transcended these early influences, integrating them with the work of other authors he encountered throughout his life, notably William James and especially Henri Bergson. Locally, he was to some extent influenced by José Enrique Rodó, although their philosophies are quite divergent.

=== Reality, science, and philosophy ===
Vaz Ferreira understood reality as something beyond us, but which we may contact in diverse ways. Logic serves to organize and make it manageable, while language allows it to be shared. From these elements we construct theories and systems, construct arguments and discourses, etc. Such tools allow us to interact with reality on a practical level, even if they deform and obscure it to a certain extent.

The disparity between reality – in all its completeness and vastness – and the intellectual tools used to simplify and reduce it into manageable terms led Vaz Ferreira to identify an incompatibility between language and thought when expressing reality. He thus became convinced that "systems" are insufficient to comprehend the world around us.

Systematization, according to Vaz Ferreira, is a natural and often fruitful tendency of the human spirit. Nevertheless, it often produces dogmas that conflict with reality.

He backed up these assertions with concrete examples, using these to reinforce the validity of classifications which, as abstract concepts, can only vainly resolve vague situations. In spite of this, he insisted such classifications could be useful, in the sense of pragmatic rather than abstract utility.

Vaz Ferreira conceived of language itself as a system of classification in which to speak of something is merely to establish its place in a simplified scheme, and therefore to detach it from the complexity of reality. This detachment allows a distinction to be made between reality and its expression, avoiding transcendentalization, shifting the burden of ontological concerns to the linguistic level, where they need not be contemplated.

For Vaz Ferreira, the difference between scientific inquiry and the world is revealed by the attribution to the former of an instrumental character, a distinction that runs against the positivism of the philosopher's formative years.

Whereas science is instrumental and limited, philosophy is a form of inclusive knowledge that recognizes the shortcomings of systematic thought; philosophy is that which establishes the limitations as well as the boldness of the sciences, and it is the role of philosophy to integrate all human knowledge.

The philosophical understanding of science corresponds not to a formal scheme but to a gradual process, in which the objects of scientific inquiry are assessed independently and inclusively. Philosophy thus parallels science in order to comprehend it. Vaz Ferreira used the sea as a metaphor for understanding and abstraction: as depth increases, there is less clarity. This deepening leads to a loss of precision, according to which science, although a form of knowledge that is distributed and shared, establishes itself as an imperious necessity, the same as philosophy. In this respect, philosophy and science exist in a fraternal relationship, not as discontinuous disciplines, but as components of the same phenomenon.

Vaz Ferreira recognized both good and bad forms of positivism, and saw similar dualities within skepticism and pragmatism. While bad positivism imposes scientific limitations on human understanding, good positivism encourages a love of science, which imparts numerous benefits, including to philosophy. Whereas bad skepticism presumes the impossibility of understanding, good skepticism encourages a healthy distrust of language and systematization. While bad pragmatism subjugates belief entirely to one's own will, good pragmatism regulates belief by acknowledging one's ignorance.

=== Living Logic or Psycho-Logic ===
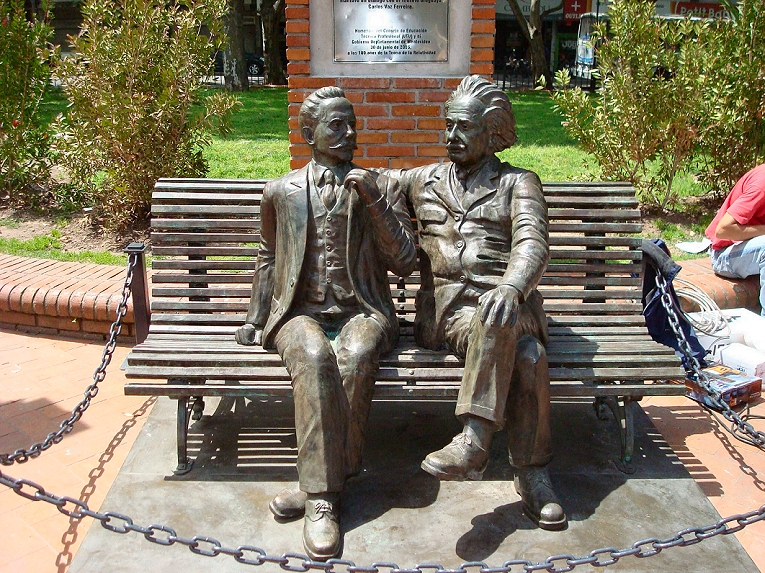
Monument to Albert Einstein discussing with Carlos Vaz Ferreira in 1925. Plaza de los Treinta y Tres Orientales, Cordón, Montevideo, Uruguay.

One of Vaz Ferreira's fundamental concepts is Living Logic (Lógica Viva) or Psycho-Logic (Psico-Lógica), which he began to develop after completing "The Problems of Liberty". The central idea of Living Logic is to uncover the way in which language and schematization not only depart from reality, but many times encounter problems that do not exist.

In Living Logic, one can detect the logicism of Stuart Mill on the one hand and the psychologicism of Bergson and William James on the other. The latter was a major feature of the spiritualist and idealist intellectual climate that predominated in Uruguay during the 1900s.

This exhibition of errors, fallacies, and paralogisms forms the basis of a new mode of thought, more comprehensive than the traditional variety, based on the living, concrete phenomena on which schemes are formulated.

Hence, Living Logic comprises an Ethic of Understanding, with implications relating to metaphysics, the philosophy of religion, and morality.

=== Morality ===
Vaz Ferreira conceived of morality as an intent to delineate reality according to the categories imposed by schemes and language, combined with the rejection of systematic and dogmatic solutions. On the contrary, he advocated a morality that acknowledged the unique problems of each person and place, and sought to solve them accordingly.

This morality, which emphasizes nothing as much as experience, attributes to metaphysics the role not of theories and definitions, but suggestions and a vision of immense possibilities.

Ideals, for Vaz Ferreira, interfere with practicality, since they admit choices which many times require needless sacrifices, both for oneself and for others. Conflict leads to conflict, and this culture of struggle gives rise to a conflictual morality that permeates and plagues the history of mankind.

=== Religion ===
Carlos Vaz Ferreira was a freethinking agnostic, like many cultured Uruguayans of the period. Although he often criticized Catholic and Protestant religious institutions, he was not particularly critical of religious sentiment in itself, which he considered an open and expectant spiritual attitude in the face of the transcendent unknown. Vaz Ferreira understood religiosity as a field of metaphysical questions and doubts which, through sincerity and open-mindedness, can be met as they truly are.

== Major works ==
=== Books ===
- Curso expositivo de Psicología elemental (1897)
- Ideas y Observaciones (1905)
- Los problemas de la libertad (1907)
- Conocimiento y acción (1908)
- Moral para los intelectuales (1908)
- El Pragmatismo (1909)
- Lógica viva (1910)
- Lecciones de pedagogía y cuestiones de enseñanza (1918)
- Sobre la propiedad de la tierra (1918)
- Sobre los problemas sociales (1922)
- Sobre feminismo (1933)
- Fermentario (1938)
- La actual crisis del mundo (1940)

=== Essays ===
- Ideas sobre la estética evolucionista (1896)
- Psicología (1897)
- Sobre la percepción métrica (1920)
- Estudios pedagógicos (1921)
- Trascendentalizaciones matemáticas ilegítimas y falacias correlacionadas (1963)
- Sobre enseñanza de la filosofía (1963)
- Enseñanza de las ciencias experimentales (1963)
- Tres filósofos de la vida (1965)

== Sources ==
- Ardao, Arturo. Introducción a Vaz Ferreira Montevideo, Barreiro y Ramos, (1961)
- Ardao, Arturo, Ciencia y metafísica en Vaz Ferreira, Revista de la Universidad de México, XXVII/4 (1972)
- Romero Baró, J. M. Filosofía y ciencia en Carlos Vaz Ferreira Barcelona: PPU, 1993.
