= Ariel Award =

Annual Mexican Academy of Film Award

Ariel Awards
- Current: 66th Ariel Awards
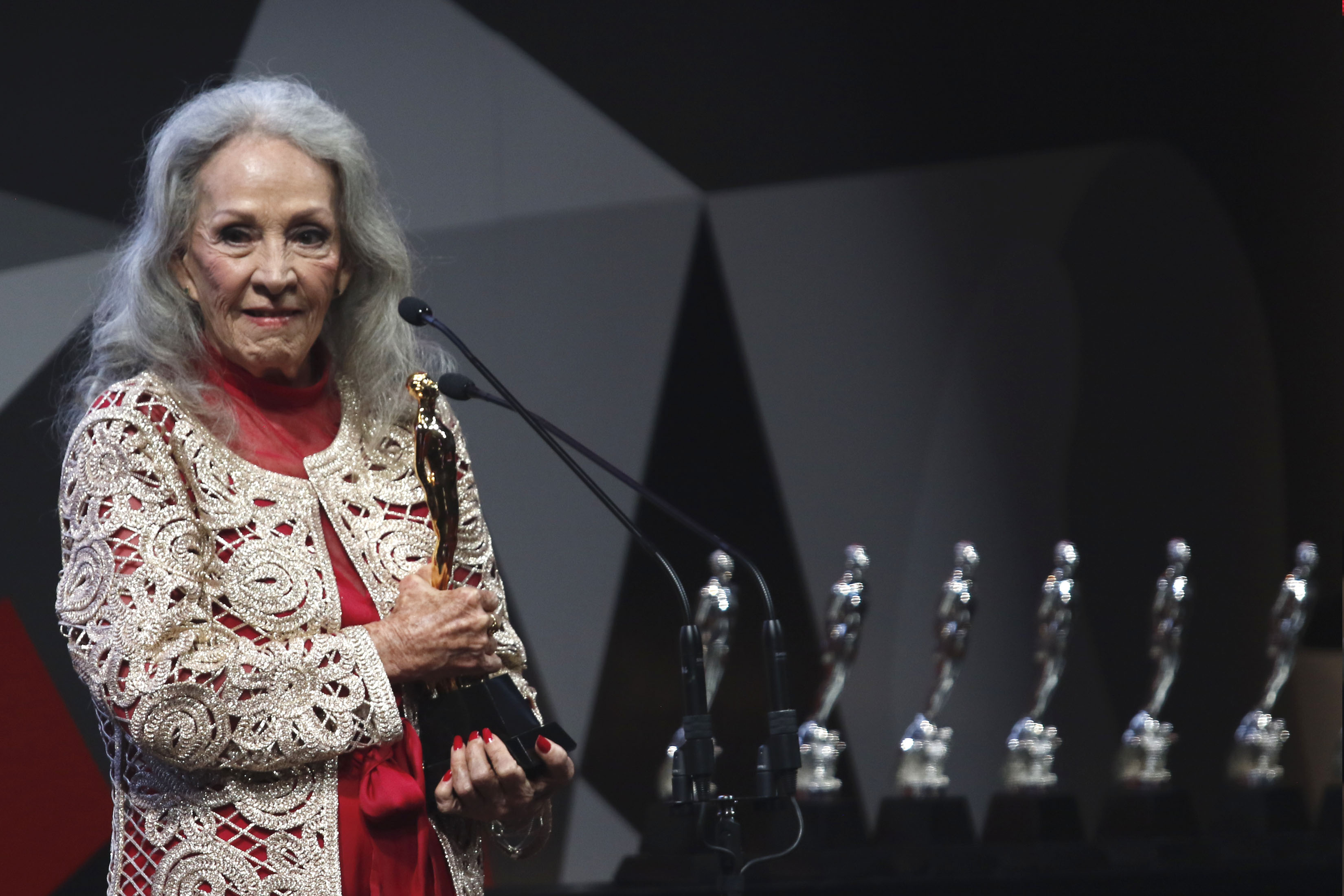
- Actress Isela Vega with an Ariel award (2017)
- Awarded for: Artistical and technical excellence in the Mexican film industry
- Country: Mexico
- Presented by: Mexican Academy of Cinematographic Arts and Sciences
- First award: May 15, 1947; 79 years ago

The Ariel Award (Spanish: Premio Ariel) is an award that recognizes the best of Mexican cinema. Given annually, since 1946, by the Mexican Academy of Cinematographic Arts and Sciences (AMACC), the award recognizes artistical and technical excellence in the Mexican film industry. The purpose of the Ariel recognition is to stimulate and increase the excellence of Mexican cinema, favor the growth of the industry, and promote the meeting and strengthening of the national film community. It is regarded as the most prestigious award in the Mexican film industry and considered Mexico's equivalent to the Oscars of the United States.

== History ==
The statuette is in the image of a man and it was designed by the sculptor Ignacio Asúnsolo. The original statuette is currently found inside Churubusco Studios in Mexico City. The name "Ariel" was inspired by a series of short writings called El Ariel by Uruguayan writer José Enrique Rodó that inspired generations of young Latin Americans in the first decades of the 20th century.

== Awards ==
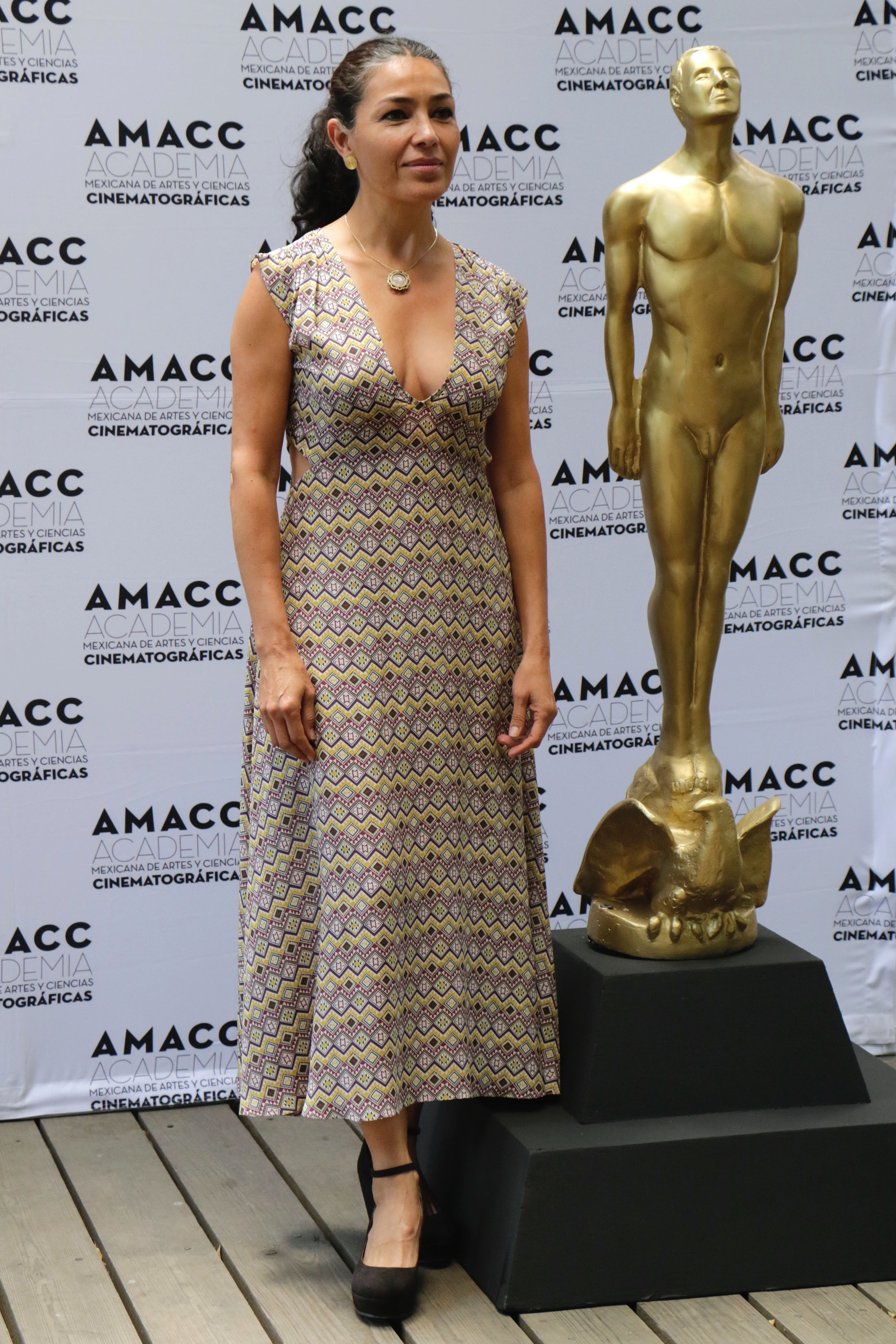
Actress Dolores Heredia next to the Ariel statuette (2017)

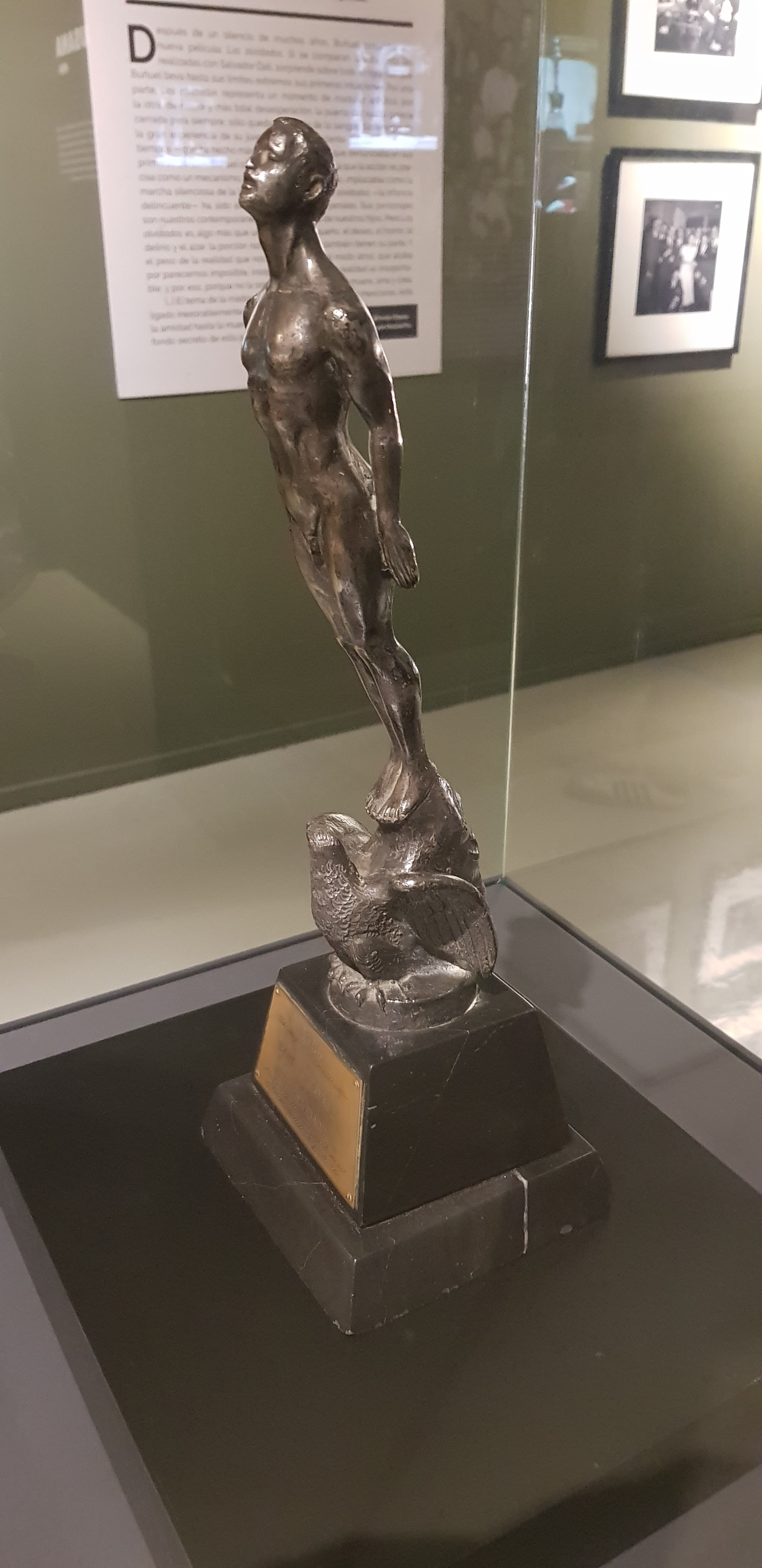
Awarded Ariel statuette given to the film Los Olvidados (1950) during the sixth ceremony of the awards

- Ariel de Oro (Golden Ariel)
- Ariel Award for Best Picture
- Ariel Award for Best Director
- Ariel Award for Best Actress
- Ariel Award for Best Actor
- Ariel Award for Best Supporting Actor
- Ariel Award for Best Supporting Actress
- Ariel Award for Best Breakthrough Performance
- Ariel Award for Best Original Screenplay
- Ariel Award for Best Cinematography
- Ariel Award for Best Editing
- Ariel Award for Best Original Score
- Ariel Award for Best Sound
- Ariel Award for Best Art Design
- Ariel Award for Best Costume Design
- Ariel Award for Best Makeup
- Ariel Award for Best Special Effects
- Ariel Award for Best First Work
- Ariel Award for Best Short Documentary
- Ariel Award for Best Documentary Feature
- Ariel Award for Best Animated Feature Film
- Ariel Award for Best Fiction Short
- Ariel Award for Best Animated Short
- Ariel Award for Best Ibero-American Film
- Ariel Award for Best Actor in a Minor Role
- Ariel Award for Best Actress in a Minor Role
- Ariel Award for Best Child Performance
- Ariel Award for Best Youth Performance
- Ariel a Mejor Ambientación
- Ariel a Mejor Argumento Original (Best Original Story)
- Ariel a Mejor Cortometraje Educativo, Científico o de Divulgación Artística (Best Educational, Scientific, or Artistic Short Film)
- Ariel a Mejor Escenografía (Best Production Design)
- Ariel a Mejor Guión Adaptado (Best Adapted Screenplay)
- Ariel a Mejor Guión Cinematográfico (Best Screenplay for Cinema)
- Ariel a Mejor Música de Fondo (Best Score)
- Ariel a Mejor Mediometraje Ficción (Best Medium-Length Fiction)
- Ariel a Mejor Mediometraje Documental (Best Medium-Length Documentary)
- Ariel a Mejor Tema Musical (Best Song)

=== Additional awards ===
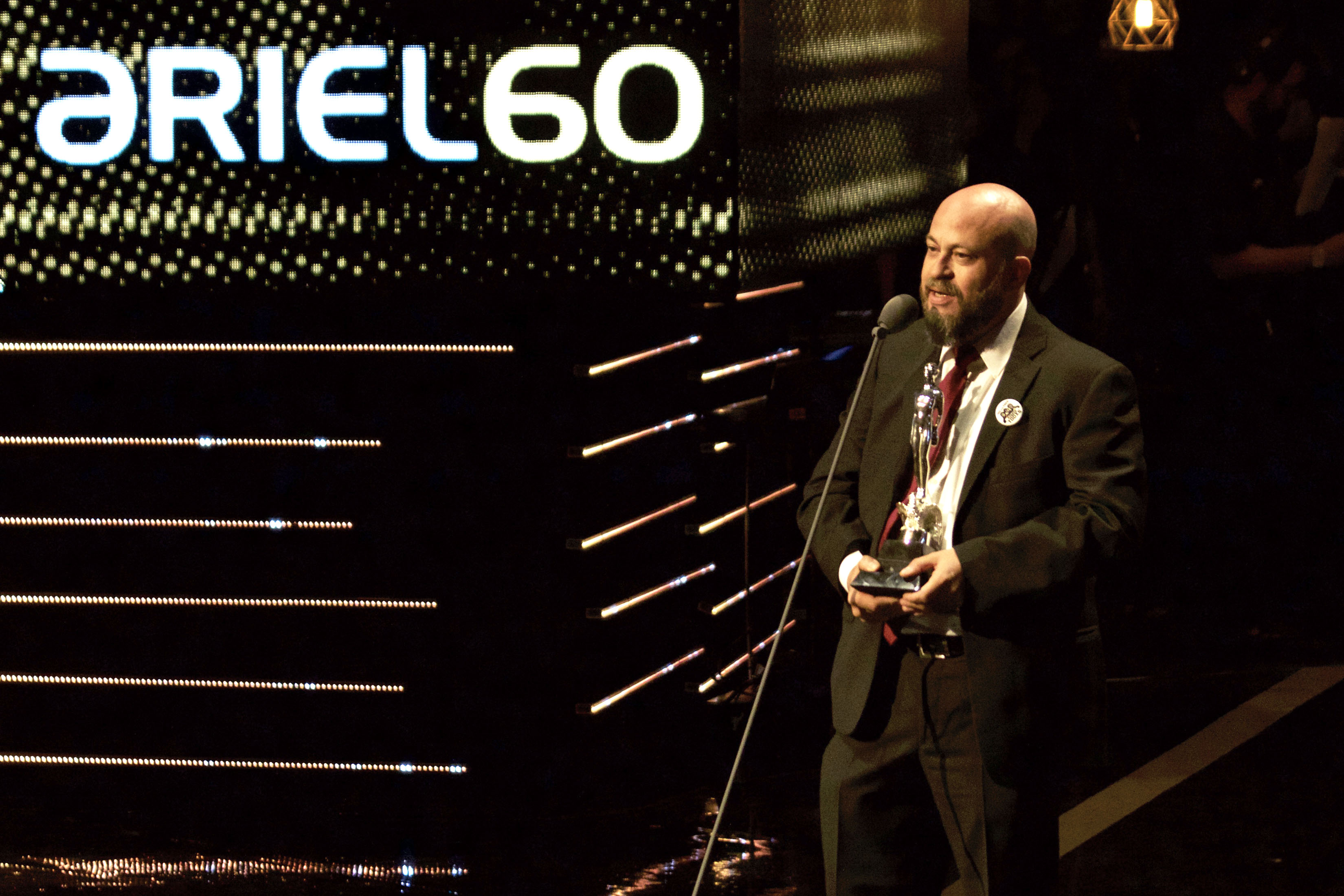
Everardo González (2018)

- Ariel Especial de Plata (Special Silver Ariel)
- Premio Especial (Special Ariel)
- Premio de Honor (Honorary Award)†
- Premio Medalla Salvador Toscano (Salvador Toscano Medal)
- Reconocimiento del Instituto Mexicano de Cinematografía (Special Recognition)
- Diploma de Honor (Honorary Diploma)

Key
†	Denotes awards that are irregularly given
