= Ariel (essay) =

Essay by José Enrique Rodó

Ariel is a 1900 essay by Uruguayan author José Enrique Rodó. Drawn from William Shakespeare's The Tempest, in which Ariel represents the positive, and Caliban represents the negative tendencies in human nature, this essay is a debate on the future course of history, in what Rodó intended to be a secular sermon to Latin American youth, championing the cause of the classical western tradition.

Ariel belongs to the movement known as modernismo, characterized by its elegance, artistic prose, and worldly references and allusions. Even though it is an essay, its ideas are expressed through Prospero's narrative voice. Prospero, the teacher, and Ariel are references to the characters in The Tempest, and the use of their names is an example of modernismo's desire for cosmopolitism. In Ariel, Prospero's seminar includes both famous and lesser-known European authors. He makes frequent reference to Goethe, Gaston Deschamps, St. Francis of Assisi, Schiller, and Guyau. Prospero also focuses on locations such as Ancient Greece, and he emphasizes Hellenic beauty as the only ideal worthy of imitation. Rodó uses Ariel as a metaphor that symbolizes beauty, the spirit, and that which is good. The opposite of Ariel is the utilitarian, symbolized by Caliban, and he cites positivismo and nordomanía as two reasons why this movement has gained popularity. Ariel is structurally based on binary opposition, and the figures of Ariel and Caliban are diametrically opposed.

In Ariel, Rodó surveys the situation Latin America was facing at the end of the 19th century. He points out that utilitarianism relies on specialization and materialism, and that consequently, the wealth of our minds is affected. Such practice can and will affect the spirit. In order for Latin America to revive its spirit, Rodó proposed strict adherence to the aesthetic ideals of the Ancient Greek and Roman cultures. He believed both of these embody a sense of beauty, and most important, both realms recognize the significance of devoting oneself to an activity of the mind. Art is then a form of learning that finds and enriches the spirit and negates utilitarianism.

== See also ==
- Ariel Award
