= Magariños =

Magariños is a surname of Galician origin.

Notable people with the surname include:

- Alejandro Magariños Cervantes (1825–1893), Uruguayan writer and lawyer
- Carlos Alfredo Magariños (born 1962), Argentine politician
- Germán Magariños (born 1978), Argentine film director and producer
