= Constitutional Party (Uruguay) =

Political party in Uruguay

The Constitutional Party (Spanish: Partido Constitucional) was a political movement in Uruguay. Although its existence was relatively brief, it played an important conceptual role in Uruguay at the end of the 19th century. It is considered one of the country's first ‘ideological parties’. Other similar parties that preceded it, short-lived, were the Liberal Union (1855) and the Radical Party (1873).

Among its most prominent members were: Martín C. Martínez, Carlos María Ramírez, Pablo de María, José Pedro Ramírez, Juan C. Blanco, Elías Regules, Luis Piñeyro del Campo and Domingo Aramburú.

== Sources ==
- Intellectuals and politics in Uruguay (in Spanish)
- Republican ideas in the origins of Uruguayan democracy (in Spanish)
