= Ismael Cortinas (politician) =

Uruguayan political figure, journalist and playwright

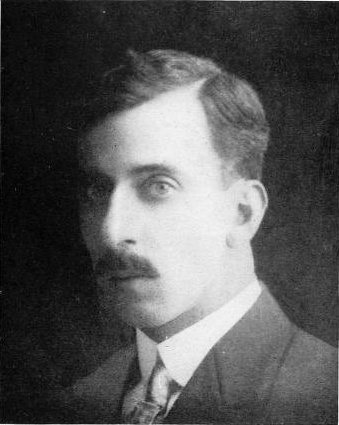
Ismael Cortinas

Ismael Cortinas (1884–1940) was a Uruguayan political figure, journalist and playwright.

== Background ==
Ismael Cortinas was born on 17 June 1884 in San José de Mayo, Uruguay, son of Miguel Cortinas and Laura Ventura Peláez Maciel. He went to Universidad de la República (University of the Republic of Uruguay) but never graduated. Writer, politician, activist and playwright Laura Cortinas was his sister, and Cesár Cortinas, a noted musician, was his brother.

Cortinas was a journalist by profession.

He also wrote plays, including the comedy 'La rosa natural'. He was one of several Uruguayan authors who flourished in Buenos Aires during the period of realism in rioplatense theater at the turn of the 20th century, others being Otto Miguel Cione (1875–1945), Edmundo Bianchi (1880–1965) and Orosmán Moratorio (1883–1929).

Cortinas died in Montevideo in 1940

== Political career ==
Cortinas served as a Deputy of the Republic from 1915 to 1925, as a member of the National Party (Uruguay).

He subsequently served as a Senator of the Republic from 1925 to 1929, and served as the President of the Senate in 1929.

He was a member of the National Council of Administration from 1929 to 1933. He was noted for his differences with President of Uruguay Gabriel Terra especially from 1933 onwards.

=== Legacy ===
The town of Ismael Cortinas, in Flores Department, was named after him in 1950.

== See also ==
- Politics of Uruguay
- List of Uruguayan writers

== Sources ==
- Cortés, Eladio; Barrea-Marlys, Mirta (2003), Encyclopedia of Latin American Theater, Greenwood Publishing Group, ISBN 978-0-313-29041-1
