= Lauro Ayestarán =

Uruguayan musicologist

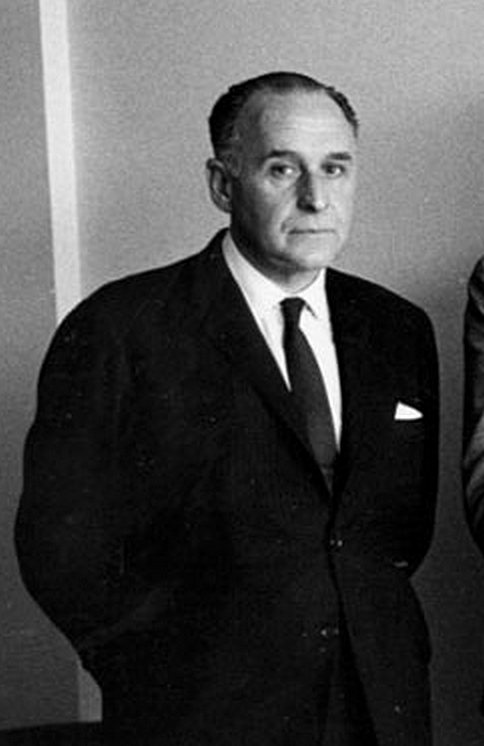
Lauro Ayestarán in 1962.

Lauro Costa (Montevideo, 9 July 1913 – 22 July 1966, Montevideo) was an Uruguayan musicologist.

== Selected works ==
- Doménico Zipoli. El gran compositor y organista romano del 1700 en el Río de la Plata. (Museo Histórico Nacional. 1941)
- Crónica de una temporada musical en el Montevideo de 1830 (Ediciones Ceibo. 1943)
- Fuentes para el estudio de la música colonial uruguaya (Universidad de la República. 1947)
- La música indígena en el Uruguay (Universidad de la República. 1949)
- La primitiva poesía gauchesca en el Uruguay. Tomo 1 (El Siglo Ilustrado. 1950)
- La misa para el día de difuntos de Fray Manuel Ubeda (Universidad de la República. 1952)
- La música en el Uruguay. Tomo I (SODRE. 1953)
- Virgilio Scarabelli (Monteverde. 1953)
- Luis Sambucetti. Vida y obra (Museo Histórico Nacional. 1956)
- El centenario del Teatro Solís (Comisión de Teatros Municipales. 1956)
- La primera edición uruguaya del "Fausto" de Estanislao del Campo (Universidad de la República. 1959)
- Presencia de la Música en Latinoamérica. La joven generación musical y sus problemas. (Universidad de la República. 1959)
- Doménico Zipoli. Vida y obra (Museo Histórico Nacional. 1962)
- El Minué Montonero (en colaboración con Flor de María Rodríguez. Ediciones de la Banda Oriental. 1965)
- Cronología comparada de la historia del Uruguay 1830-1945 (with Blanca París de Oddone, Aurelio Lucchini, Otilia Muras, Arturo Ardao, Washington Buño, Carlos Real de Azúa, and Susana Salgado. 1966)

=== Posthumous ===
- El folklore musical uruguayo (Arca. 1967)
- Teoría y práctica del Folklore (Arca. 1968)
- Cinco canciones folklóricas infantiles (Asociación de Educadores Musicales del Uruguay, 1969)
- El Himno Nacional (Arca. 1974)
- El candombe a través del tiempo (Fono-Música. 1983)
- El tamboril y la comparsa (recopilación de sus textos por Flor de María Rodríguez y Alejandro Ayestarán. Arca. 1990)
- Las músicas infantiles en el Uruguay (recopilación de sus textos por Flor de María Rodríguez y Alejandro Ayestarán. 1995)

== See also ==
- Flor de María Rodríguez (his wife and collaborator)
