= Otto Miguel Cione =

Uruguayan writer

Otto Miguel Cione Falcone
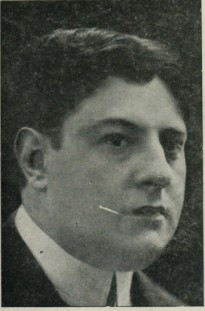
- Cione, from the cover of his Clavel del Aire (1913)
- Born: 15 August 1875; Asunción, Paraguay
- Died: 6 September 1945 (aged 70); Montevideo, Uruguay
- Other names: Martin Flores
- Known for: Writer, dramatist and essayist

Otto Miguel Cione Falcone (15 August 1875 – 6 September 1945) was a Uruguayan journalist (using the pseudonym Martin Flores), dramatist and writer. His most successful play was El arlequín (1902), which was performed throughout the Spanish-speaking world. His novel Lauracha (1911) ran through several editions and was made into a film.

== Life ==
Otto Miguel Cione was born in Asunción, Paraguay on 15 August 1875. His parents were Italian. His father was Pascual M. Cione and his mother was Angela Flacone. He moved to Uruguay at an early age, and became a citizen of that country. His father was a leading doctor, and insisted that he attend university, but he did not finish his studies. For some time he was Consul of Uruguay in Concordia, Entre Ríos, Argentina. Later he was Section Head of the National Labor Office, and then Librarian in the Secondary Education Section of the Universidad de Montevideo. In 1942 he was librarian of the "Alfredo Vázquez Acevedo" Institute, the university's section of secondary and higher education.

== Work ==
Cione began his career as a journalist with contributions to the Revista Nacional of Literature and Social Sciences, directed by José Enrique Rodó, Victor Pérez Petit and the Martínez Vigil brothers. Cione contributed to the main newspapers and magazines of the Río de la Plata, particularly the Sunday supplement of La Mañana, Montevideo. He published weekly articles in La Mañana in Montevideo under the pseudonym "Martín Flores". His short story La atrevida operación del Dr. Otis, published in the humorous magazine Caras y Caretas in 1901, describes a partial brain transplant where the blood of the evil recipient rejects the lobe of a good person's brain. He also wrote as a theatrical critic for the Argentine journals El Pais, El Diario, Critica, Ultima Hora, La Argentina and Idea Nacional and for the Montevideo journals Diario del Plata and El Censor.

Cione was the author of many successful theatrical plays. Most of his work was produced in Argentina. He was one of several Uruguayan authors who flourished in Buenos Aires during the period of realism in rioplatense theater at the turn of the 20th century, others being Ismael Cortinas (1884–1940), Edmundo Bianchi (1880–1965) and Orosmán Moratorio (1883–1929). The most famous interpreter of his works was the actor Pablo Podestá.

Cione's play El gringo (1904) was inspired by the play La gringa (1902) by Florencio Sánchez. El gringo tells of an artistocratic woman whose family has lost its money. She marries a rich gringo who was once a poor immigrant. They prove to have nothing in common, the marriage breaks down and eventually the gringo kills himself. His tragedy El Arlequín (1908) was performed in all the theaters of South America and in theaters in Mexico, Costa Rica, Spain and Italy. L'Arlequin, a tragedy in three acts concerning hereditary alcoholism, was inspired by Henrik Ibsen's Ghosts. Cione won first prize out of 47 entries in the Dramatic Works competition of the National Theater in Buenos Aires with his Presente Griego (1913).

Cione has been described as a vigorous humorist in the tradition of Jonathan Swift and Mark Twain, and one of the basic supports of South American literature. He wrote several novels. He won second prize out of 110 entries with his Maula (1902) in the "El Pais" novel contest in Buenos Aires. Cione's novel Lauracha was applauded by South American and Spanish critics and is considered one of the most important American novels of its genre. The 4th edition, published in Spain, ran to 60,000 copies. Lauracha was adapted for the screen by Hugo Mac Dougall. The 1946 Argentine drama film Lauracha was directed by Arturo García Buhr and starring Amelia Bence.

== Publications ==
Publications by Otto Miguel Cione include:

- Cione, Otto Miguel (1901), The Banfield Petroleo Co. o La fuente maravillosa : comedia en tres actos y en prosa, BNE MSS/23023/3
- Cione, Otto Miguel (1901), Novela o realidad : entremés en un acto, BNE MSS/23026/2
- Cione, Otto Miguel (1901), La eterna ciega : drama en tres actos, BNE MSS/23026/1
- Cione, Otto Miguel (1901), La rosa de Jericó : comedia en tres actos, BNE MSS/23026/7
- Cione, Otto Miguel (1902), Maula! (novel: 2nd prize at the "El País" Contest), BNE VC/1439/6
- Cione, Otto Miguel (1910), El arlequín, Montevideo, Uruguay: O. M. Bertani, BNE 1/237638(4) Reprinted 1912, 1913, 1920
- Cione, Otto Miguel (1911), Partenza : drama en tres actos, Montevideo, Uruguay: O. M. Bertani, BNE 1/237290
- Cione, Otto Miguel (1911), Lauracha, (la vida en la estancia) : novela americana 3ª ed. (Novel), Buenos Aires, Argentina: Tip. Ivaldi & Checchi, BNE HA/4925 5ª ed. 1933
- Cione, Otto Miguel (1913), Presente griego : fantasía trágica en dos actos, BNE 1/237639(6)
- Cione, Otto Miguel (1913), Clavel del aire : (comedia en dos actos), Montevideo, Uruguay: O. M. Bertani, BNE 1/237639(7)
- Cione, Otto Miguel (1920), Caraguatá! ... y otros cuentos cortos (collection of short stories), BNE HA/5147
- Cione, Otto Miguel (1920), Maula! : premiada en el concurso de "El País" (de Buenos Aires) y otras novelas, BNE HA/6167
- Cione, Otto Miguel (1920), La tragedia de Yolanda, BNE 1/232104
- Cione, Otto Miguel (1920), La única prueba--, BNE 1/231092
- Cione, Otto Miguel (1920), El corazón de la selva : tragedia bárbara en tres actos, BNE 1/237576(5)
- Cione, Otto Miguel (1920), El gringo : drama en tres actos, BNE 1/238947(21
- Cione, Otto Miguel (1920), Gallo ciego : drama en dos actos; Paja brava : comedia dramática en dos actos, BNE 1/238949(13)
- Cione, Otto Miguel (1921), ¡Maula! : comedia en tres actos, BNE 1/237969(9)
- Cione, Otto Miguel (1921), Flor de camalote : comedia dramática en tres actos, BNE 1/238957
- Cione, Otto Miguel (1921), La barca errante : drama en tres actos, BNE 1/237577(5)
- Cione, Otto Miguel (1921), Antes del drama : gran comedia en tres actos, BNE 1/237971(2)
- Cione, Otto Miguel (1924), Chola se casa; La generosidad de Cacho; Una piedrita en el camino; Misterio de la subconciencia (short novel and three short stories), BNE HA/5230
- Cione, Otto Miguel (1952), El otro : tragedia en dos actos : género gran guignol, BNE MSS/23008/3
- Cione, Otto Miguel (1953), La casa de vidrio : drama en tres actos, BNE MSS/23008/2

== Sources ==
- Christian, Orlando (1979), Costanzo Colonna: roman, Nouvelles Editions Latines, ISBN 978-2-7233-0084-1
- Cortés, Eladio; Barrea-Marlys, Mirta (2003), Encyclopedia of Latin American Theater, Greenwood Publishing Group, ISBN 978-0-313-29041-1
- Jones, Willis Knapp (2014-07-24), Behind Spanish American Footlights, University of Texas Press, ISBN 978-1-4773-0016-9
- "Lauracha (1946)", Cine Nacional, 12 August 2015
- Ludmer, Josefina (2004-06-01), The Corpus Delicti: A Manual of Argentine Fictions, University of Pittsburgh Pre, ISBN 978-0-8229-7082-8
- Nuestros escrítores - Otto Miguel Cione (in Spanish) – via Ibero-Amerikanisches Institut
- Resultados de la búsqueda (in Spanish), BNE: Biblioteca Nacional de España
- Scarone, A., "El arlequín", Uruguayos contemporaneos (in Spanish)
- Scarone, Arturo (1942), "563. – MARTIN FLORES", Diccionario de seudónimos del Uruguay (in Spanish), Montevideo: Claudio Garcia
- Scarone, Arturo (1937), "CIONE. (Otto Miguel)", Uruguayos Contemporaneos (in Spanish)
- Visca, Arturo Sergio (1975), Ensayos sobre literatura uruguaya (in Spanish), Comisión Nacional de Homenaje del Sesquicentenario de los Hechos Históricos de 1825
