= Laura Cortinas =

Uruguayan writer, politician, feminist, activist and playwright (1881-1969)

Laura Cortinas Ventura (1881-May 5, 1969) was an Uruguayan politician, writer and feminist activist. She was also a playwright.

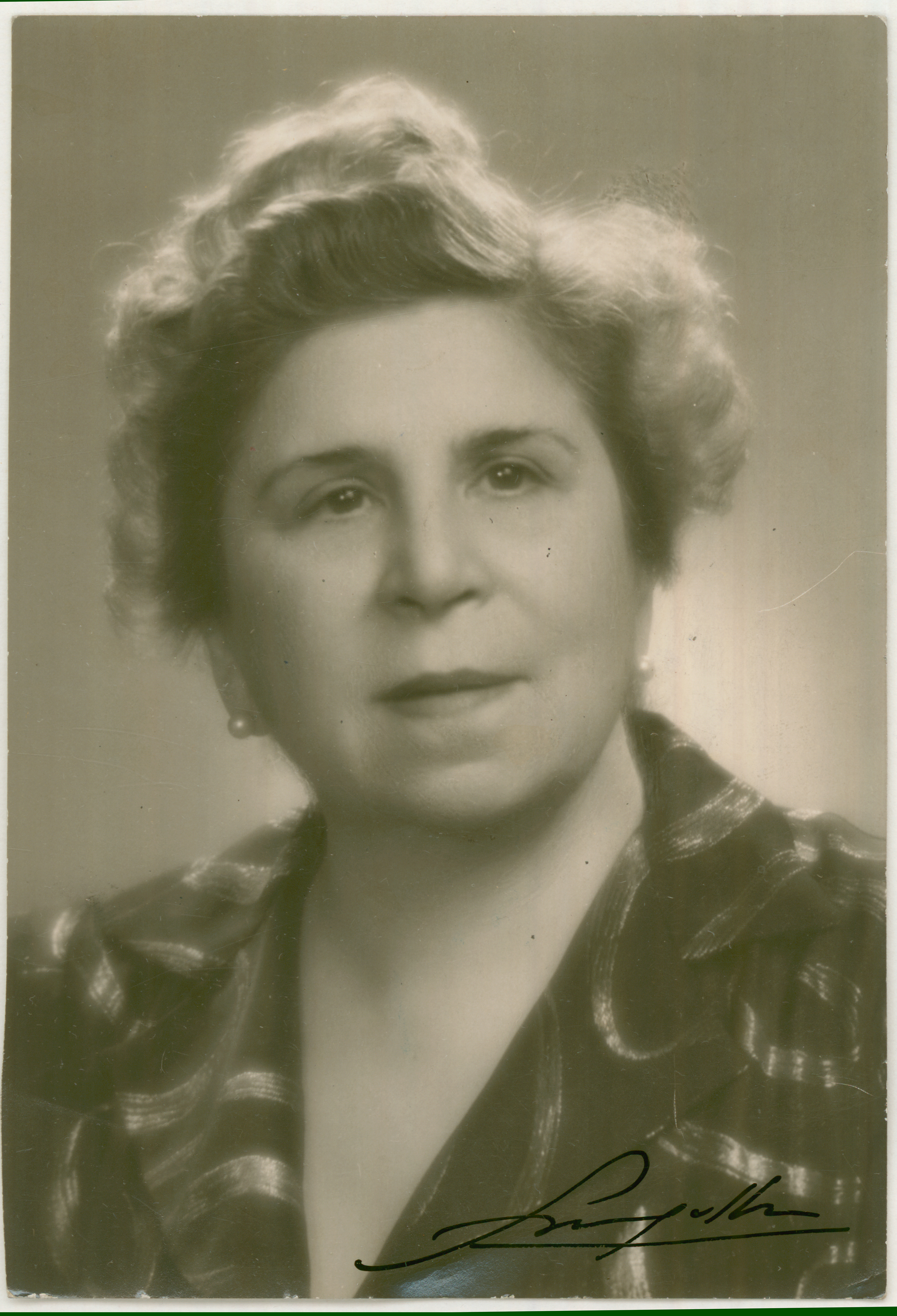
Laura Cortinas

== Early life ==
She was born in San José de Mayo, Uruguay, at an unspecified date in 1881. She was the daughter of wealthy hacienda owners, Miguel Cortinas and Laura Ventura Peláez. She was one of five children, which also included her brother, noted musician Cesár Cortinas. Another brother was politician Ismael Cortinas. In 1905, when she was 23 or 24, her father Miguel was elected as deputy for the city of San José de Mayo, thus she, along with the rest of her family, moved to Montevideo, to be near her dad, whose responsibilities now placed him as a politician in Uruguay's largest city.

Soon, after her brother Cesár contracted tuberculosis, she and her family moved to Paris, France, hoping to find a cure for her brother, but after World War I broke out, they relocated to Mendoza, Argentina, where her brother died.

== Career ==
After her brother Cesár died in 1918 (some say 1919 instead), Laura decided to dedicate part of her life to memorializing her brother's musical career.

Around that time, Cortinas became a politician and she began working at the legislative palace of Uruguay, becoming their library director. She and her brother Ismael were involved in some fights to overturn some of the Uruguayan laws of the time.

In addition to her feminist activism, Cortinas became a prolific book writer; some of her works were presented on Argentine theater with the help of playwright Gregorio Martinez Sierra. In addition, she presented her literary work, "El Buen Amor" ("Good Love") at Teatro Solis in Montevideo, beginning on August 31, 1929. Among other books she wrote are 1953's "El Ultimo Velo" ("The Last Veil") and 1954's "La Niña de las Trenzas Negras" ("The Black Braided Girl").

Later in life, she joined some Uruguayan feminist political groups.

== Death ==
She died on May 5, 1969.

== See also ==
- List of Uruguayans
