= Flor de María Rodríguez =

Uruguayan ballet dancer and choreographer

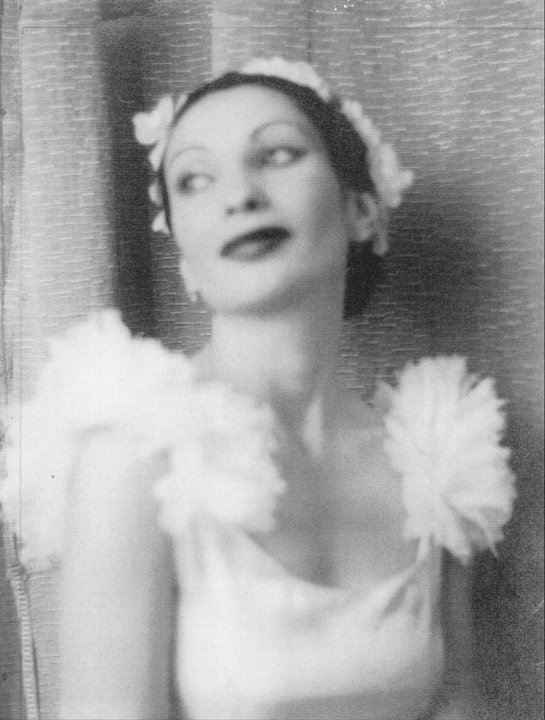
- Born: Flor de María Rodríguez; August 10, 1913; Uruguay
- Died: 24 October 2001 (aged 88)
- Occupations: ballet dancer, choreographer

Flor de María Rodríguez (10 August 1913 – 24 October 2001) was a Uruguayan ballet dancer and choreographer who, together with her husband, Lauro Ayestarán, researched and revived Uruguay's folk dances.

== Biography ==
Born in Las Piedras in the south of Uruguay, Rodríguez began her career as a ballet dancer. She was a founding member of Uruguayan National Ballet administered by SODRE, the country's broadcasting and cultural authority, where she became a prima ballerina. After a knee injury, she had to give up dancing but became a successful choreographer. She also took up acting under Carlos Brussa (1887–1952).

In 1940, she married the musicologist Lauro Ayestarán with whom she undertook research into Uruguayan dance. Thanks to the methodology she developed for reconstructing extinct dances, she and her husband revived over 20 folk dances from the colonial period, most of which had been completely forgotten. She became one of the most important researchers in the area, writing several books on the subject.

In 1975, after Margaret Graham (1931–2004) had founded the National Dance School (Escuela Nacional de Danza), Rodríguez became a co-founder of its Folklore Department where she taught dance theory and history of dance while giving practical training in ballet and dance. Additional support included theoretical subjects, such as theory of dance and folklore as well as musical literacy, didactic-pedagogical teacher training, and historical culture, including history of clothing. The division is named Flor de María Rodríguez de Ayestarán in her honor.

In 1977, she received the Gold Award at the National Folklore Festival for her extensive contributions. Flor de María Rodríguez died in Montevideo on 24 October 2001. She had six children.

== Literature ==
- Rodríguez de Ayestarán, Flor de María (1994). La danza popular en el Uruguay: Desde sus orígenes a 1900 (in Spanish). Cal y Canto.
- Rodríguez de Ayestarán, Flor de María (1993). Los que dicen las viejas tras el fuego: Refranero de la danza (in Spanish). Arca.
