= Javier de Viana (author) =

Uruguayan writer (1868–1926)

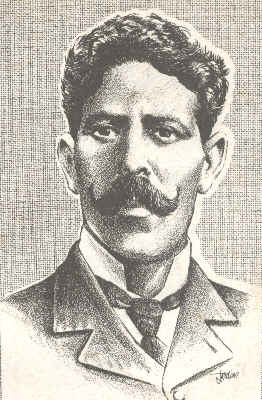
Javier de Viana.

Javier de Viana (5 August 1868 – 5 October 1926) was a Uruguayan writer.

== Background ==
He was identified with the strongly rurally based National Party (Uruguay), and, because of his involvement in the intermittent Civil War which ended only in 1904, de Viana was forced into exile in Argentina for a number of years.

== Writings ==
He wrote a number of works with rural life as theme. These works include: Gaucha (1899), Gurí (1901), and Yuyos (1912), in addition to short stories.

Among the international compilations in which his work has been included and become more widely known beyond his homeland is: José Sanz y Díaz ed., Antología de Cuentistas Hispanoamericanos, Madrid: Colección Crisol, 1945.

== Heritage ==
The northern Uruguayan town of Javier de Viana, situated in Artigas Department, is named after the writer.

== See also ==
- Javier de Viana (disambiguation)
