= El Diario (Argentina) =

- Type: Daily newspaper
- Publisher: Gerardo J. Rodríguez
- Founded: May 15, 1914
- Language: Spanish
- Headquarters: Paraná, Argentina
- Website: www.eldiario.com.ar

El Diario is an Argentine newspaper, and the primary newspaper for city of Paraná, which is the capital of Entre Ríos Province.

The newspaper was founded by Luis L. Etchevehere (who served as governor of the province from 1931–35) and first published on May 15, 1914. Enrique Pérez Colman, who later served as vice-governor for the province and finance minister for Argentina, served as editor of the paper from 1920–22. The Uruguayan novelist and playwright Otto Miguel Cione wrote theater reviews for the newspaper.

Etchevehere's grandson Luis F. Etchevehere (1934-2009) later ran the newspaper and was a leading figure in Argentine journalism.
