= María Eugenia Vaz Ferreira =

Uruguayan teacher and poet

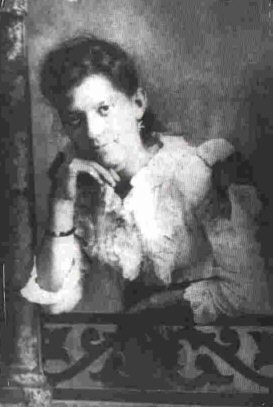
- María Eugenia Vaz Ferreira
- Born: María Eugenia Vaz Ferreira; 1875; Uruguay
- Died: 1924 (aged 48–49)
- Occupations: teacher, poet, writer

Signature
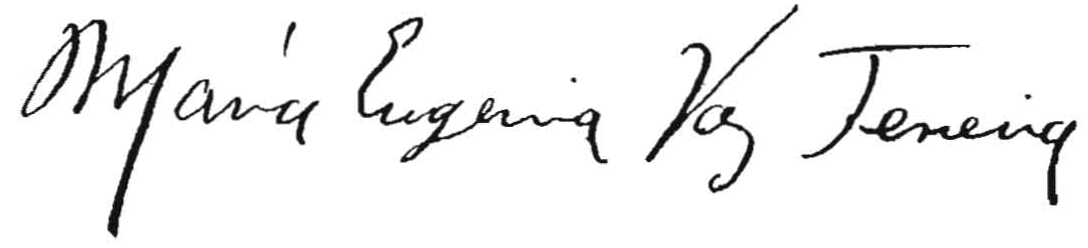

Maria Eugenia Vaz Ferreira (1875–1924) was an Uruguayan teacher and poet. She was the younger sister of philosopher Carlos Vaz Ferreira and a contemporary of Delmira Agustini and Julio Herrera y Reissig. She was born and lived in Montevideo, the capital of Uruguay.

She held a Chair in Literature at the Women's University. She suffered from mental illness and lost her reason some years before she died in 1924.

Her first volume is entitled La isla de los canticos and consists of forty selected poems (and a single poem Unico poema added at her brother's insistence) which he published shortly after her death. A second volume, entitled La otra isla de los canticos, with a prologue by Emilio Oribe and containing several poems taken from her unpublished manuscripts, appeared in 1959 shortly after her brother's death. The modern Poesías Completas contains 112 poems.

Vaz Ferreira is regarded as a metaphysical poet who wrote emotive poems that speak of passion, death, hope, and the mysteries of love and existence.

She was also a musician, and the Lauro Ayestarán collection contains one of her manuscript scores with verses and music.

Contrasting myths have been built around her life. She has been idealised as, on the one hand, a type of consumptive virgin but, on the other hand, a Sandesque cigar-smoking crossdresser notorious for practical jokes.

== Posthumous works ==
- La isla de los canticos, 1925
- La otra isla de los canticos, Impresora Uruguaya, Montevideo, 1959
- Poesías Completas, Hugo J. Verani, Ediciones de la Plaza, 1986, 292 pp

== Bibliography ==
- Antología de Poetisas Americanas, Parra del Riego, Juan, Montevideo, 1923, Pages 7–25.
- 100 autores del Uruguay, Paganini, Alberto, Paternain, Alejandro, Saad, Gabriel, Capítulo oriental, Montevideo.
- Parthenon West Review (Issue Four) eds Holler, David and Sweeney, Chad contains some translations by Liz Henry.
