= Enrique Pérez Colman =

Argentine writer and politician

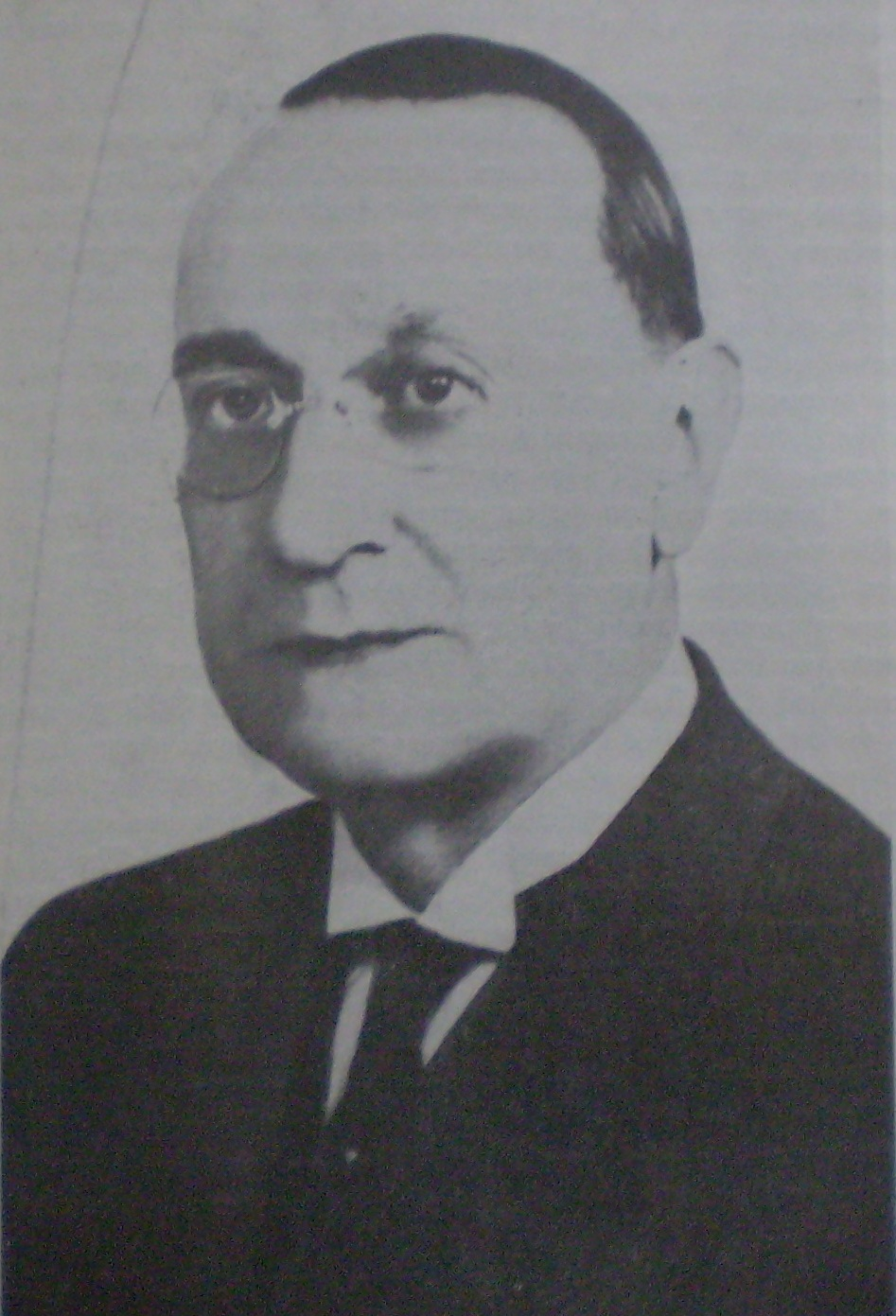

Enrique Perez Colman (Paraná, July 15, 1886, Buenos Aires, August 4, 1957) was a lawyer, journalist, writer, professor and Argentine politician, who served as Minister of the Treasury between 1928 and 1930, during the second presidency of Hipólito Yrigoyen.

== Biography ==
=== Work as a writer and journalist ===
Beside being an Yrigoyenist politician, Enrique Pérez Colman was also a writer and journalist. He is also a member of the respected Argentinian writer César Blas Pérez Colman's family.

In 1912, the Radical Civic Union newspaper La Libertad was founded, as a result of the enthusiasm of the young radicalist movement; its main editors were Enrique Pérez Colman and the Radical Civic Union Eduardo F. Lemos.

As a journalist, he was the Director of El Diario de Paraná (1920-1922), and the director of the University Magazine of the National University of the Litoral.

He also wrote several books:

| Book | Year |
|---|---|
| Sobre el gran sacerdocio y otras páginas | (1924) |
| El Syllabus | (1925) |
| Amores al terruño | (1926) |
| El Tinglado de la Farsa | (1929) |
| Historia De Entre Rios | |
