= Rufino Bauzá =

Uruguayan independence fighter

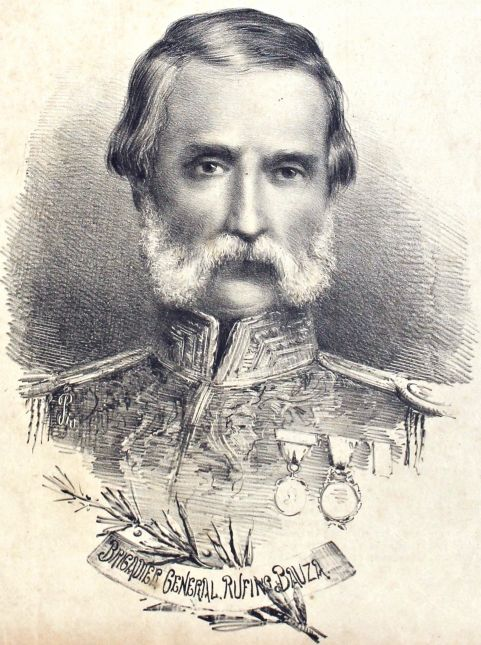
Rufino Bauzá in El lndiscreto

Rufino Bauzá (1791–1854) was a Uruguayan independence fighter and military and political figure.

== Earlier events in life; family background ==
He was involved many of the conflicts associated with the movement for Uruguayan independence, and subsequently in the early years of the intermittent Civil War which the country experienced throughout much of the 19th century. He was associated at various stages with noted figures such as José Artigas, Fructuoso Rivera and Manuel Oribe.

His son Francisco Bauzá was a political figure and noted historian.

== Minister of War ==
He served as Minister of War in 1844–1845. He identified with the emerging Colorado Party's outlook.

== See also ==
- List of political families#Uruguay
- History of Uruguay
