= Isidoro de María =

Uruguayan politician, writer & historian (1815–1906)

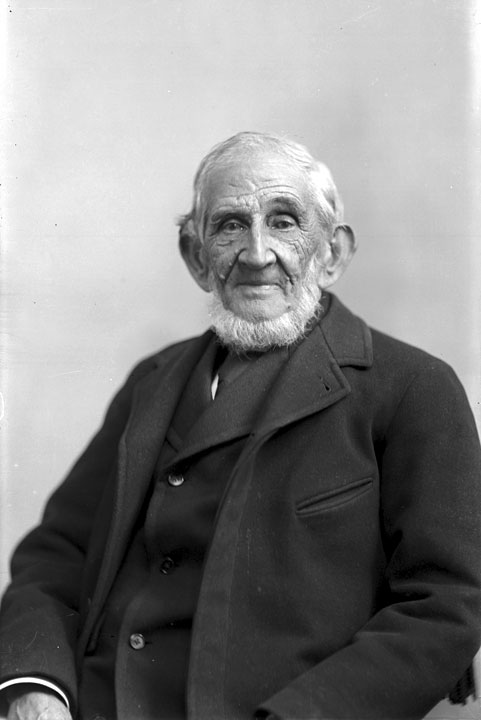
Isidoro de María Gomez

Isidoro de María (January 2, 1815 – August 16, 1906) was a Uruguayan writer, historian, journalist, politician and diplomat.

In 1833 he married Sinforosa Navarrete Artigas (a relative of José Gervasio Artigas) with whom he fathered several children, among others, writer and politician Pablo de María and folklorist poet Alcides de María.

Among other works he wrote:

- Vida del Brigadier General José Gervasio Artigas fundador de la Nacionalidad Oriental (1860)
- Tradiciones y recuerdos. Montevideo antiguo, four volumes published between 1887 and 1895
- Compendio de la Historia de la República Oriental del Uruguay (editor).
