= Carlos Reyles =

Uruguayan novelist (1868–1938)

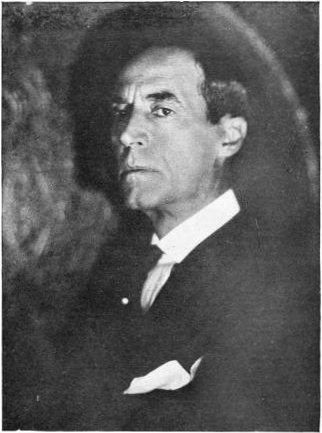
- Born: Carlos Claudio Reyles Gutiérrez; October 30, 1868; Montevideo, Uruguay
- Died: July 24, 1938 (aged 69); Montevideo, Uruguay
- Occupation: Writer

Carlos Claudio Reyles Gutiérrez (30 October 1868 – 24 July 1938) was a Uruguayan novelist and essayist known for his Naturalistic and Modernist works exploring Uruguayan rural life. He is best known for his novel El Embrujo de Sevilla (1922).
