= Emilio Oribe =

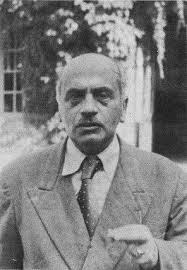
- Born: Emilio Nicolás Oribe; 13 April 1893; Melo, Uruguay
- Died: 24 May 1975 (aged 82); Montevideo, Uruguay

Emilio Nicolás Oribe (April 13, 1893 – May 24, 1975), was a Uruguayan poet and philosopher.

A professor at the University of the Republic, Uruguay, Oribe was dean of the university's Faculty of Humanities and Sciences and a member of the Uruguayan Academy of Letters.

As a poet, he developed an avant-garde style influenced by Ultraism.

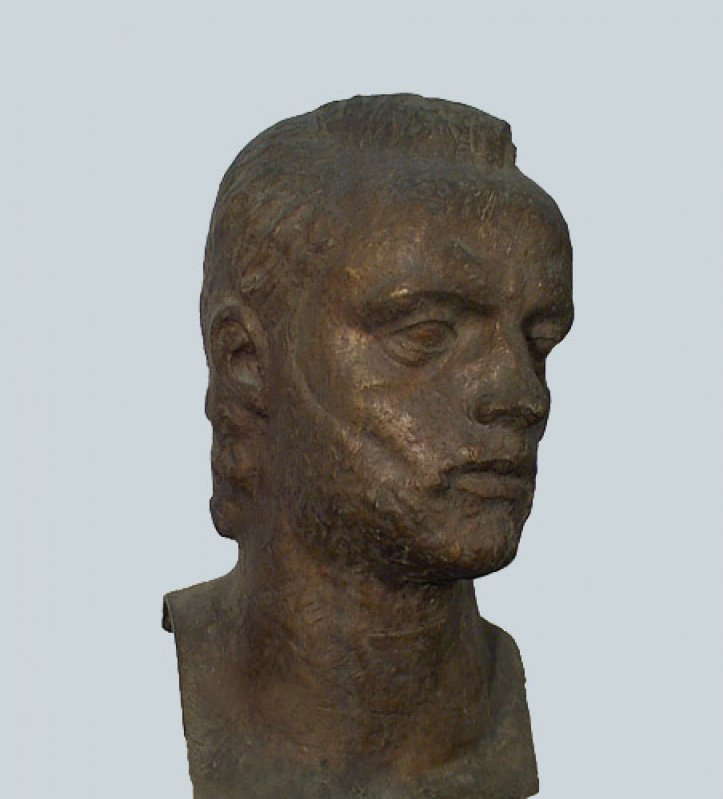
Bust of Emilio Oribe

As a philosopher, he was a strong idealist, and often expressed himself using aphorisms.

== Notable works ==
=== Poetry ===
- Alucinaciones de belleza (1912)
- El nardo del ánfora (1915)
- El castillo interior (1917)
- El halconero astral (1919)
- El nunca usado mar (1922)
- La colina del pájaro rojo (1925)

=== Essays ===
- Poética y plástica (1930)
- Teoría del «nous» (1934)
- El mito y el logos (1945)
- Ars magna (1960)
