= Ernesto Herrera (playwright) =

Uruguayan playwright and journalist

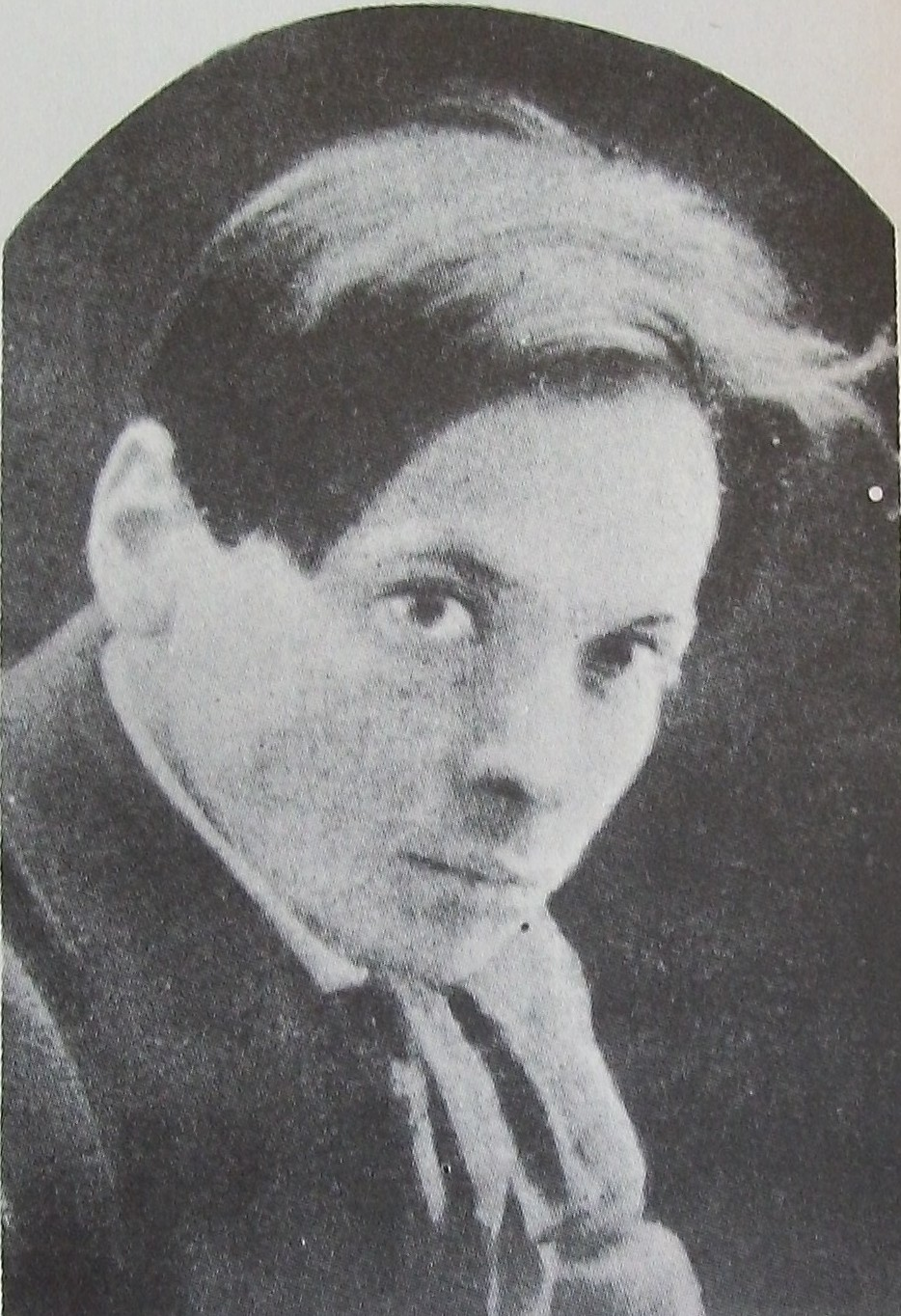
Ernesto Herrera

Ernesto Herrera (1889–1917) was a Uruguayan playwright, short story writer and journalist.

== Background ==
Herrera was a steadfast anarchist and a prolific writer of short stories and plays, featuring large on the Uruguayan literary scene from his late teens until his premature death at the age of twenty-seven. His first publication, Su Majestad el Hambre: Cuentos Brutales, was a collection short stories linked around the central themes of poverty and hunger, laying bare the author’s anger at the injustice and brutality he witnessed in contemporary Uruguayan society, and depicting a world in which desperation and violence go hand in hand. His most famous work for the stage was El león ciego (The Blind Lion), published in 1911.

He travelled to Europe on several occasions, mainly visiting Spain, Portugal and France.

== Principal works ==
=== Short stories ===
- Su majestad el hambre (cuentos brutales) (1910)

=== Plays ===
- El estanque (1910)
- Mala laya (1911)
- El león ciego (1911)
- La moral de Misia Paca (1911)
- El pan nuestro (1914)
- El caballo del comisario (1915)
- El Moulin Rouge (1915)
- La bella Pinguito (1916)
- La princesita Cenicienta (unfinished)

== Death and legacy ==
His early death in 1917 when he had not yet attained the age of 30 left his reputation as an accomplished playwright with a sense of unfulfilled potential.

== See also ==
- List of Uruguayan writers
