= Carlos María Ramírez =

Uruguayan politician (1848–1898)

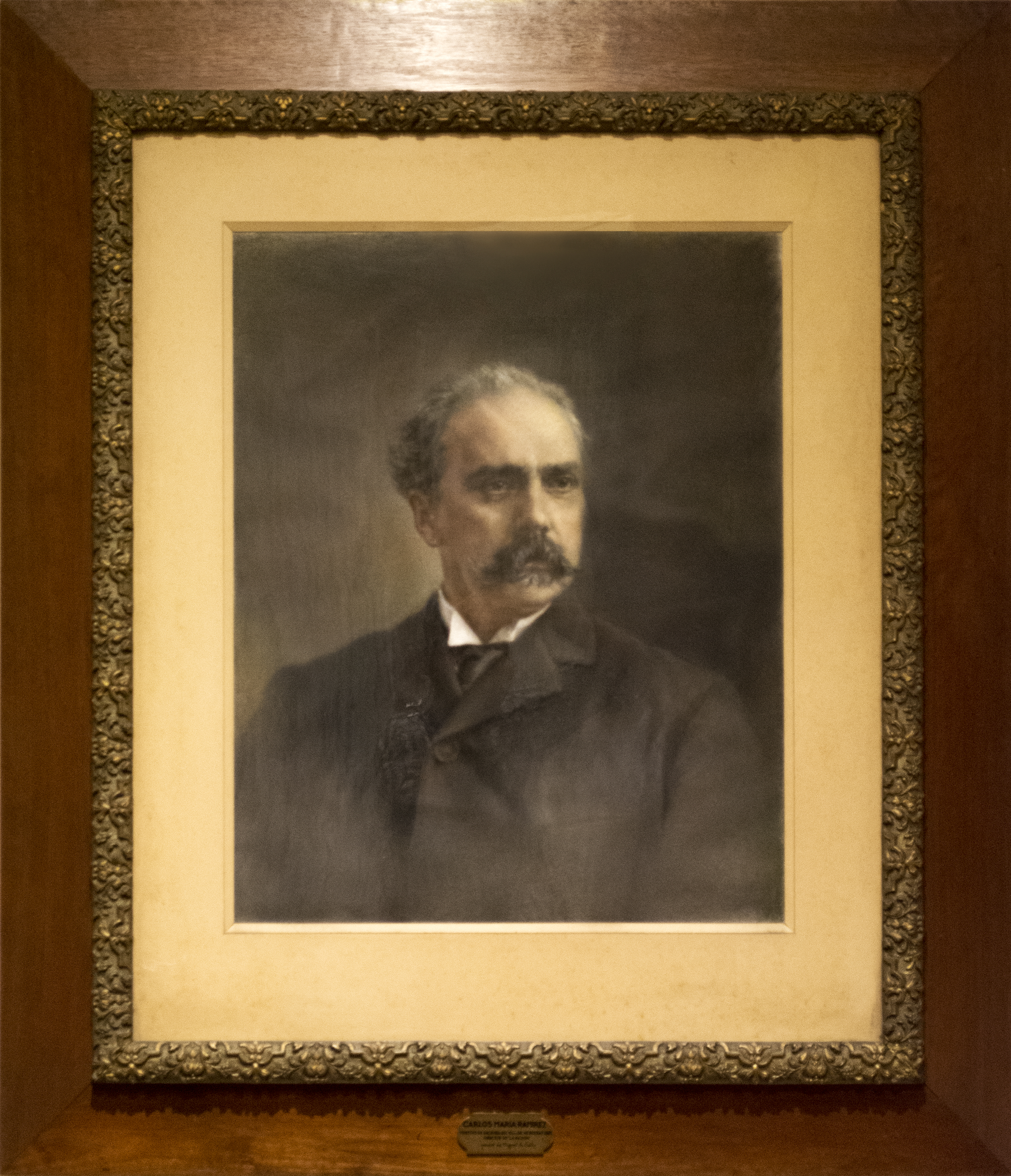
Carlos María Ramírez

Carlos María Ramírez (1847–1898) was a Uruguayan journalist, essayist and politician. He was Minister of Finance from 1891 to 1892.

Son of Juan Pedro Ramírez Carrasco and Consolación Álvarez y Obes; brother of José Pedro, Julio, Juan Augusto, Octavio, and Gonzalo Ramírez.

He was a member of the Constitutional Party.
