= Paolo De Maria =

Prefect of the Province of Frosinone
- In office 10 May 1944 – 30 May 1944
- Preceded by: Arturo Rocchi
- Succeeded by: Giovanni Battista Zanframundo

Prefect of the Province of Savona
- In office 8 January 1945 – 29 April 1945
- Preceded by: Filippo Mirabelli
- Succeeded by: Francesco Bruzzone

Personal details
- Born: 30 October 1891 Alessandria, Kingdom of Italy
- Died: 17 February 1968 (aged 76) Spoleto, Italy
- Party: National Fascist Party; Republican Fascist Party

Military service
- Allegiance: Kingdom of Italy; Nazi Germany; Italian Social Republic
- Branch/service: Royal Italian Army; MVSN; Schutzstaffel; Guardia Nazionale Repubblicana
- Rank: Brigadier General
- Battles/wars: World War I; Battles of the Isonzo; Second Italo-Ethiopian War; World War II; Italian occupation of Yugoslavia
- Awards: Bronze Medal of Military Valor

Paolo De Maria (30 October 1891 – 17 February 1968) was an Italian Fascist politician and soldier, prefect of the province of Frosinone and later of the province of Savona during the Italian Social Republic.

== Biography ==
Born in Piedmont, he took part in the First World War as an infantry officer. He was wounded three times, and while still a cadet officer he awarded the Bronze Medal of Military Valor for his role in the Sixth Battle of the Isonzo. After the war, in 1921 he founded the Cori section of the Italian Fasces of Combat and the following year he took part in the march on Rome. In 1923 he joined the Voluntary Militia for National Security, where he would rise to the rank of console generale (brigadier general).

In 1935-1936 he volunteered for the Second Italo-Ethiopian War. He was later transferred to the reserve, but appealed the decision and he was able to return to active service. On 14 June 1943 he assumed command of the 89th Assault Blackshirt Legion "Etrusca" of Volterra (consisting of 1,500 men), stationed in Drniš and attached to the 15th Infantry Division Bergamo. Between 25 and 27 June, following reports of sabotage attempts on telegraph poles, De Maria led the legion in two anti-partisan sweeps, without success.

After the Armistice of Cassibile in September 1943, De Maria persuaded his men to continue the war alongside Germany; following negotiations with the commander of the 114th Jäger Division, his Blackshirt legion joined the Wehrmacht, being renamed Polizei-Freiwilligen-Verbande and attached to the 114th Jäger Division. The Italian soldiers kept their uniform, with the addition of a white armband bearing the word "Ordnungspolizei". De Maria then started recruiting men from other Italian units that had disintegrated after the armistice, and quickly doubled the size of his unit, which grew to nearly three thousand men; he was granted the rank of Oberst and his unit was renamed Miliz Regiment De Maria. Throughout September, the regiment continued to carry out the same task that had been entrusted to the 89th Blckshirt Legion before the armistice, namely the surveillance along the railway section between Drniš and Šibenik. On 15 September De Maria founded the Drniš section of the Republican Fascist Party.

On 27 September the Miliz Regiment handed over all its heavy weapons to the 114th Jäger Division in Drniš, after which, as had been agreed between De Maria and the SS commands, it was sent to Germany for training, being joined on the way by the Italian garrison of Knin. Once in Salzburg, however, on 5 October the train carrying De Maria and his men was diverted to a concentration camp near Berlin, despite the protests of De Maria, who tried in vain to contact the embassy of Italy. Only on 12 October, after the misunderstanding was sorted out, the soldiers were able to continue the journey to the training camps of Münsingen, where soldiers considered suitable to join the Waffen-SS were gathered; in the meantime, however, about a thousand men had decided to abandon De Maria's unit. On 11 November 1943 the three battalions of Miliz Regiment De Maria swore allegiance to Adolf Hitler, and six days later they returned to Milan, where they formed the first cadre of the Italian SS. De Maria was given the SS rank of Standartenführer.

After joining the Italian Social Republic, De Maria was appointed head of the Province of Frosinone from 10 May 1944 until 30 May 1944. He left his post shortly before the city was liberated by the Allies and moved to northern Italy, where he was temporarily placed at disposal. On 8 January 1945 he was appointed head of the Province of Savona, taking office on the following 5 February and holding it until the end of the war.

After the war he was tried by the Extraordinary Assize Court of Savona for collaborationism and sentenced to one year and eight months in prison. He died in Spoleto in 1968.
