= Francisco Bauzá =

Uruguayan politician (1849–1899)

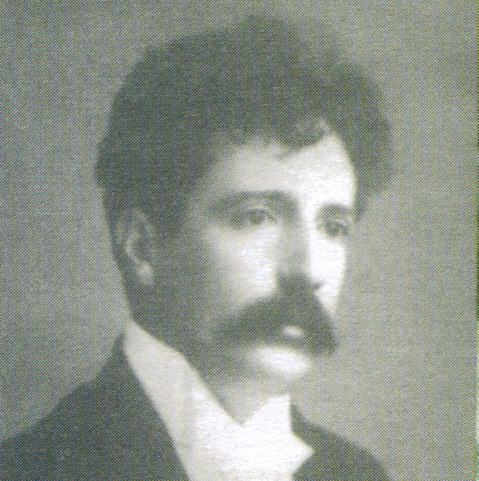
Francisco Bauzá

Francisco Bauzá (1849–1899) was a Uruguayan political figure and historian.

== Background ==
He was the son of Uruguayan independence fighter Rufino Bauzá. He was married with María Schiaffino. He was associated with the Uruguayan Colorado Party.

== Public offices ==
He served as a Deputy, Senator, and Government Minister. He also served as Uruguayan minister to Brazil.

A noted Roman Catholic in a party which was increasingly secularist, Bauzá opposed the Varela educational reforms which his own party backed. Furthermore, since the position of Catholic, he questioned the lay concept the same. In this spirit, prompted the Catholic Society Free Education; it was founded in 1882, and was presided over by Bishop Inocencio María Yéregui.

Toward the end of his life he accepted an appointment to President Juan Lindolfo Cuestas's Council of State.

== Historian ==
Bauzá was also a noted historian. His particular interest was pre-independence Uruguay, but seen from the perspective of a post-independence Uruguayan national.

== Death ==
He died in 1899.

== Bibliography ==
- Theoretical and practical studies on the institution of the National Bank (1874)
- Essays on the formation of a middle class (1876)
- History of Spanish rule in Uruguay (1880 - 1882)
- Literary Studies (1885)
- Constitutional Studies (1887)
- Poets of the revolution

== See also ==
- History of Uruguay
- Politics of Uruguay
- List of political families#Uruguay
