= Daniel Granada =

Spanish-Uruguayan philologist and writer

Vocabulario rioplatense razonado, 2nd ed. Montevideo 1890.

Daniel Granada (1847 in Vigo, Spain – 1929 in Madrid) was a Spanish-Uruguayan philologist and writer, based in Montevideo, Uruguay for much of his life, based there from the 1850s until 1904 when he returned to Spain. He was a member of the Club Universitario from its inception in 1868, under which he wrote about "Causas del movimiento intelectual en la República" ("Causes of the intellectual movement in the Republic"), examining the social and political conditions in the country. Granada is the author of Vocabulario Rioplatense Razonado, (first edition 1889, second 1890), which condenses his studies of philology, ethnography, geography and regional history. It is a widely used book in linguistic studies in Uruguay. Later works provided information on Uruguayan regional folklore and customs.
