= José Alonso y Trelles =

Uruguayan poet

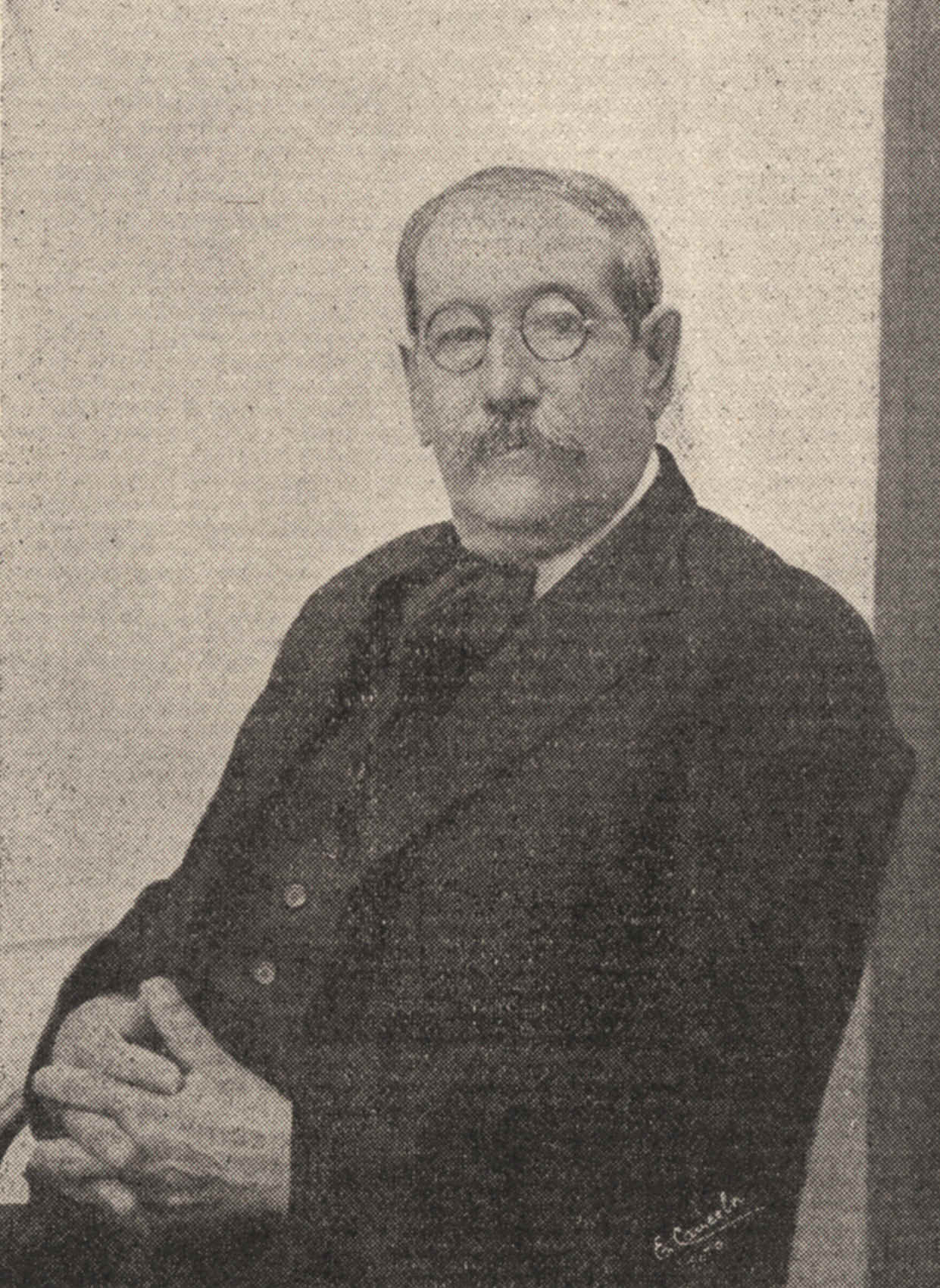
El viejo Pancho

José Alonso y Trelles (1857–1924) was a Uruguayan poet who wrote under the pseudonym El Viejo Pancho.

== Literary works ==
- John the madman (poem of two cantos. Foreword Orosmán Moratorium. Montevideo, 1867 )
- Guacha! (National drama in one act. Printing and publishing house "Renaissance" by Luis and Manuel Perez. Charter-prologue Monegal Casiano . Montevideo, 1913 )
- Paja brava (1st ed. Verses Creoles. Printing and publishing house "Renaissance" of Luis and Manuel Perez. Montevideo, 1915 )
- Paja brava (2nd ed. Verses Creoles. Augmented Edition. Printing and publishing house "Renaissance" of Luis and Manuel Perez. Montevideo, 1920 )
- Paja brava (3rd ed. Verses Creoles. Augmented Edition. A. Barreiro National Library and Ramos. Barreiro and Co.. Successors. Montevideo, 1923 )
- Paja brava (4th ed. Verses Creoles. Augmented Edition. Foreword by Justino Zavala Muniz . general Agency Bookseller & Publications. Montevideo - Buenos Aires, 1926 )
- Paja Brava El Viejo Pancho and outras works of Joseph A. and Trelles (in Galician, Ed Oriberthor, SL 1998 )
