= National Archives of Uruguay =

The National Archives of Uruguay also called Archivo General de la Nación is located in Montevideo, Uruguay. It was established in 1926.

== Directors ==
- Alicia Casas de Barran

== See also ==
- List of national archives
