= Francisco Javier de Viana =

Argentine sailor and soldier

- Born: 1764; Buenos Aires, Argentina, Viceroyalty of Peru, Spanish Empire
- Died: 1820 (aged 55–56); Buenos Aires, Argentina
- Military career
- Allegiance: Argentina, Federal Party
- Branch: Navy, Army
- Rank: General
- Conflicts: British invasions of the River Plate; Argentine Civil War

Francisco Javier de Viana (1764–1820) was an Argentine sailor and soldier who actively participated in the politics of his country as an ally of general Carlos María de Alvear.

== Career beginnings ==
He studied at the Colegio de San Carlos and later in Spain, possibly at the naval school in Cádiz, then served in the navy and in scientific commissions to establish and map borders of the era. He served as writer and reporter on the four-year voyage of the ships Descubierta and Atrevida, captained by Alejandro Malaspina.

After the British invasions of the Río de la Plata, the city of Montevideo had been left without a naval defense as the sailors had been taken prisoner to Great Britain. The authorities had to rebuild it anew and Viana was sent as part of the new naval forces.

In 1809 Viana was sent by governor Francisco Javier de Elío to rescue Martín de Álzaga, who had been exiled to Carmen de Patagones by order of viceroy Santiago de Liniers.

Upon the May Revolution he ended up in the royalist side, fighting against the revolutionaries of the Banda Oriental (present-day Uruguay). After the Battle of San José, colonel José Artigas attacked the town of Maldonado, defeating the defending commander, Viana. He was then sent as prisoner to Buenos Aires.

== Lautaro Lodge and Alvear's dictatorship ==
After being freed, he was incorporated to the Argentine Army with the rank of lieutenant colonel, in command of the navy. Until the end of 1811 he was the commander in chief of the comandante of the revolutionary navy, even though command of the squadron was under Juan Bautista Azopardo until his defeat at San Nicolás de los Arroyos.

He was made colonel in June 1813 and a member of the Lautaro Lodge, and was named governor of the Córdoba del Tucumán Intendancy, a post he occupied only for a short time. His opposition accused him of governing his province (which at the time included the Cuyo region and the La Rioja Province) as if it were enemy occupied territory, obtaining contributions by force, and punishing and rewarding the citizens for their adherence - or not - to the Buenos Aires government. In February 1814 he was replaced by Francisco Ortiz de Ocampo, a native of La Rioja who, even though born in the interior, could not control the tendency of the population to favor provincial autonomy, which would soon arrive in any case.

Returning to Buenos Aires, Viana became a member of the consulting council for the Supreme Director Gervasio Posadas, and accompanied general Carlos María de Alvear to finish the siege of Montevideo. He became good friends with Alvear; both were enemies of the Federal Party led by Artigas.

Back in Buenos Aires, he was promoted to general and name minister of war and navy, a post he maintained in the last few months of Posadas's government, and during the last three months of Alvear's government.

In March 1815 he organized and commanded an expedition against the federals of Santa Fe Province, but before he could depart in that direction, the commander of his advance forces, colonel Ignacio Álvarez Thomas, revolted at Fontezuelas. That sublevation started the revolution which would force Alvear to resign and go into exile. Viana went with his friend and boss to Río de Janeiro, and upon arriving found he had been deported for life.

== Last years ==
When the Portuguese took Montevideo, in 1818, Viana went there and explicitly accepted the foreign government. He returned to Buenos Aires during the anarchy of 1820 along with Alvear, to work on the revolution which would carry Alvear to a short-lived government in part of the province. Viana, ill at the time, remained in the city when Alvear joined the Santa Fe people under Estanislao López, and died in Buenos Aires in 1820.

== Bibliography ==
- Cutolo, Vicente (1968–1985). Nuevo diccionario biográfico argentino. Buenos Aires: Elche.
- Beruti, Juan Manuel (2001). Memorias curiosas. Buenos Aires: Emecé.
- Segreti, Carlos S. A. (1980). La aurora de la Independencia - Memorial de la Patria. Buenos Aires: La Bastilla.
- Busaniche, José Luis (2005). Historia argentina. Buenos Aires: Taurus. ISBN 987-04-0078-7.
