= Alejandro Magariños Cervantes =

Uruguayan writer and lawyer (1825–1893)

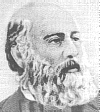
Alejandro Magariños Cervantes

Alejandro Magariños Cervantes (1825 – 1893) was an Uruguayan writer and lawyer. He was Minister of Finance in 1869.

== Biography ==
Cervantes was born in 1825, in Montevideo. He went to Spain, receiving his Juris Doctor, and returned to Uruguay in 1855. He worked as a journalist for El Mercurio de Valparaíso and The Constitutional. He died in 1893, in Montevideo.

== Bibliography ==
- Memories of a good man (1849)
- Caramurú. Life on a whim (1850)
- Columbus and the New World (1850)
- There is no evil that for good does not come (1852)
- Celiar (1852)
