= Elías Regules =

Uruguayan physician, teacher, writer and politician

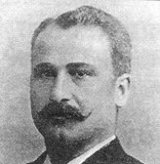
Elías Regules c.1895

Elías Regules (1861–1929) was a Uruguayan physician, teacher, writer and politician.

He was a member of the Constitutional Party.

== Works ==
=== Poetry ===
- Mi tapera (1894)
- Pasto de cuchilla (1904)
- Renglones sobre postales (1908)
- Veinte centésimos de versos (1911)
- Mi pago (1924)
- Versitos criollos (1924)

=== Theatre ===
- "Martín Fierro" (1890),
- "El entenao" (1892)
- "Los gauchitos" (1894)
