= Blanca París de Oddone =

Uruguayan historian and academic

- Born: María Blanca París Corcoll; 7 July 1925; Montevideo, Uruguay
- Died: 23 June 2008 (aged 82); Montevideo, Uruguay
- Occupation: historian
- Years active: 1960-2004
- Parent(s): Rosa Corcoll; Francisco París

Blanca París de Oddone (7 July 1925 – 23 June 2008) was a Uruguayan historian and academic, who published extensively on Uruguayan and South American history. She was the winner of a Ford Foundation Fellowship and a Guggenheim Fellowship to further her academic research.

== Early life ==
María Blanca París Corcoll was born on 7 July 1925 in Montevideo, Uruguay to Rosa Corcoll and Francisco París, to Catalan parents. She began her tertiary studies at the University of Buenos Aires in the philosophy and literature faculty in 1946. She continued her education at the University of Chile in 1948 and then transferred that same year to the University of the Republic in Montevideo. Finishing her studies in 1951, she completed her thesis research and graduated with a bachelor's degree in history in 1957. She went on to further her studies at the University of Buenos Aires in 1960.

Married to Juan Oddone, they had a son, Gabriel Oddone, an economist.

== Career ==
Beginning her career in 1960, París taught in the Humanities and Education Faculty at University of the Republic. In the early 1960s, she married fellow academic Juan Oddone. Between 1960 and 1968 she conducted research in archives of England, France, Italy and Spain on a Gallinal Scholarship, which focused on the immigration to the Río de la Plata. In 1974, she was dismissed from her post after the Uruguayan coup d'état. Taking advantage of a Ford Foundation Fellowship, she studied at the Consejo Latinoamericano de Ciencias Sociales between 1974 and 1975. De Oddone and her husband lived in Mexico during their exile, where de Oddone worked at the National Autonomous University of Mexico beginning in 1977. She was a collaborator for the journals Universidades from 1978 to 1981 and Nuestra América from 1980 to 1981. In 1981, de Oddone won a Guggenheim Fellowship. and began a research project at the Union of Latin American Universities (UDUAL), focused on the social history of education in Uruguay.

When the Uruguayan military dictatorship ended, de Oddone returned to Uruguay and was restored to her position at the University of the Republic. She was promoted to a full professor in 1991. She published extensively both independently and with others and was recognized as an expert on the historic period leading up to the 1973 coup. Some of her most noted works are Las relaciones entre Montevideo y Buenos aires en 1811 (The relationship between Montevideo and Buenos Aires in 1811, 1947–48); La Universidad de Montevideo en la formación de nuestra conciencia liberal, 1849-1885 (The University of Montevideo in the formation of our liberal conscience: 1849-1885, 1948); and Figuras e instituciones catalanas en Uruguay (Figures and Catalan institutions in Uruguay, 1960). In collaboration with her husband, she published Cronología comparada de la historia del Uruguay, 1830-1945 (Comparative chronology of the history of Uruguay: 1830-1945, 1966) and La universidad uruguaya desde el militarismo a la crisis, 1885-1985 (The Uruguayan university from militarism to crisis: 1885-1985, 1971). De Oddone retired in 2004. In 2007, de Oddone and her husband, as well as investigators Benjamín Nahum and José Pedro Barrán, were declared Illustrious Citizens of Montevideo by the City Council.

== Death and legacy ==
De Oddone died on 23 June 2008 in Montevideo and she was buried at the Cementerio del Norte the following day.
