= Alberto Methol Ferré =

Uruguayan historian and theologian (1929–2009)

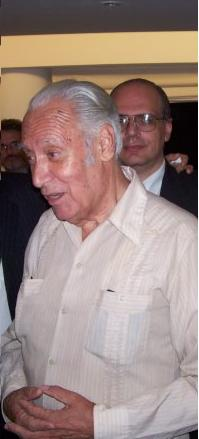
- Alberto Methol in 2009.
- Born: Alberto René Methol Ferré; 31 March 1929; Uruguay, Montevideo
- Died: 15 November 2009 (aged 80); Uruguay, Montevideo
- Education: Universidad de la República
- Occupations: writer, journalist, teacher, historian, theologian
- Spouse: Belén Sastre
- Children: Marcos, Lucas, Pedro

Alberto René Methol Ferré (Montevideo, 31 March 1929 – 15 November 2009) was a Uruguayan thinker, writer, journalist, teacher, historian and theologian. He has been described as one of Latin America's most fertile and original thinkers.

== Biography ==
Alberto Methol Ferré was born in Montevideo in 1929. He first studied in the Liceo Francés de Montevideo and then Law and Philosophy in the Universidad de la República.

He was professor of Latin American History, of Contemporary History and of Theory of History in the University of Montevideo and in the Instituto Artigas de Servicio Exterior. He founded and coordinated the magazine Nexo (1955–1958, 1983–1989), he also worked for the magazine Víspera between 1967 and 1975.

He was active in the political Uruguayan landscape. He collaborated with Luis Alberto de Herrera; he worked in the agrarian movement with Benito Nardone; In the sixties he was involved in the leftish political party Unión Popular led by Enrique Erro; he was also an assistant of Líber Seregni in the Broad Front.

He was a staunch supporter of Juan Domingo Perón and he considered himself more a rioplatense historian than a Uruguayan or an Argentinian one.

Between 1975 and 1992 he took part in a pastoral reflection team of the Latin American Episcopal Conference, he was secretary for the laypeople and created courses of the Catholic Church History in Latin America between 1977 and 1982 in Medellín and in Bogotá (Colombia). He was also member of the Pontificio Consejo para los Laicos between 1980 and 1984.

His father was an agnostic and Methol just converted to Catholicism when 19. When young he was heavily influenced by the Generation of '98.

He was awarded by Argentina with the Order of May.

In 2007 he published a book with an interview by Alver Metalli which was introduced by then Archbishop of Buenos Aires and later pope Jorge Mario Bergoglio. Bergoglio adhered to his idea of "libertine atheism".

He died in Montevideo in 2009.

According to one author, he was an influence in the thought of Pope Francis.

== Works ==
- La Crisis del Uruguay y el Imperio Británico (Editorial A. Peña Lillo, Buenos Aires, Argentina. 1959)
- El Uruguay como problema (Editorial Diálogo, Montevideo, Uruguay. 1967)
- La Conquista Espiritual (Enciclopedia Uruguaya, Nº 5, Editores Unidos y Arca, Montevideo, Uruguay. 1968)
- Las Corrientes Religiosas (Colección Nuestra Tierra, Nº 35, Nuestra Tierra, Montevideo, Uruguay. 1969)
- El Risorgimiento Católico Latinoamericano
- Perón y la alianza argentino-brasileña (2000)
- La América Latina del siglo XXI (Entrevista realizada por el periodista y escritor italiano Alver Metalli. Publicada por Edhasa, marzo. 2006)

== Links ==
- Sitio oficial de Alberto Methol Ferré
- De los estados-ciudad al Estado continental industrial
- "Obra de Methol Ferré en Internet". Archived from the original on 24 January 2009.
