= Gaston Deschamps =

French archaeologist and writer (1861–1931)

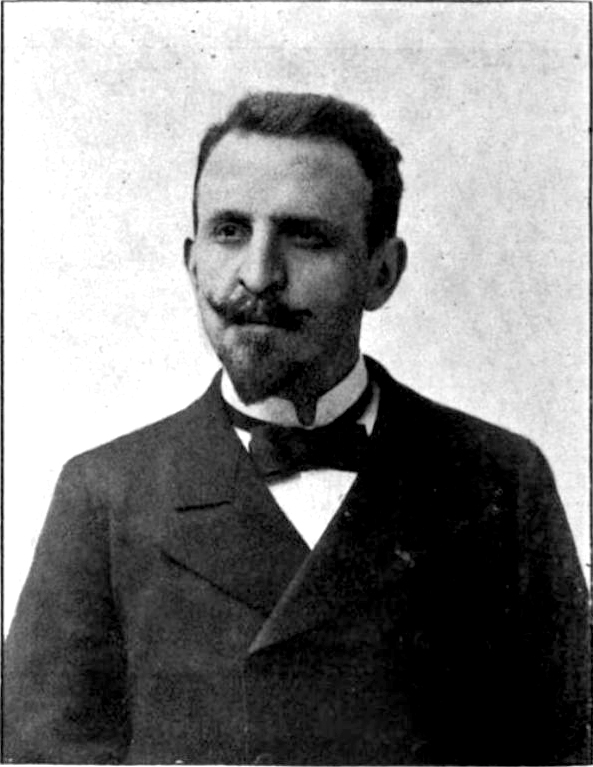
- Gaston Deschamps en 1901.
- Born: Charles Pierre Gaston Napoléon Deschamps; 5 January 1861; Melle
- Died: 15 May 1931 (aged 70); Paris
- Occupations: Archaeologist; Writer; Journalist

Charles Pierre Gaston Napoléon Deschamps (5 January 1861 – 15 May 1931) was a French archaeologist, writer and journalist.

After he joined the École normale supérieure in 1882, Deschamps was appointed a member of the French School at Athens in 1885. He conducted archaeologic excavations in Amorgos, Chios and in Anatolia.

== Selected publications ==
- 1896: Le Chemin fleuri, récit de voyages. Paris, Calmann-Lévy.
- 1892: La Grèce d’aujourd’hui, Paris, A. Colin, 1892. Work crowned by the Académie française.
- 1894: Sur les routes d’Asie, Paris, A. Colin.
- 1894–1900: La Vie et les livres, Paris, A. Colin et cie.
- 1899: Le Malaise de la démocratie, Paris, A. Colin.
- 1906: Le Rythme de la vie, Paris, A. Colin.

== Sources ==
- Henri Avenel, La Presse française au vingtième siècle, Paris, É. Flammarion, 1901, (p. 206).
