= Javier de Viana =

- Populated centre
- Location in Uruguay
- Coordinates: 30°25′58″S 56°47′14″W
- Country: Uruguay
- Department: Artigas Department

Population (2011)
  - Total: 140
- Time zone: UTC -3
- Postal code: 55005
- Dial plan: +598 477 (+5 digits)

Javier de Viana is a town in the Artigas Department of northern Uruguay. It was named after the Uruguayan writer Javier de Viana.

== Geography ==
The town is located on Route 30, about 33 kilometres (21 mi) west of the city of Artigas and 1.5 kilometres (0.93 mi) northeast of the stream Arroyo Tres Cruces.

== Population ==
In 2011 Javier de Viana had a population of 140.

Year	Population
1963	318
1975	283
1985	261
1996	225
2004	206
2011	140

Source: Instituto Nacional de Estadística de Uruguay
