= José Enrique Rodó =

Uruguayan writer (1871–1917)

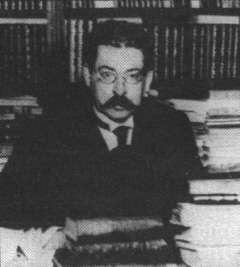
- Born: José Enrique Camilo Rodó Piñeyro; July 15, 1871; Montevideo, Uruguay
- Died: May 1, 1917 (aged 45); Palermo, Italy
- Occupation: essayist

José Enrique Camilo Rodó Piñeyro (15 July 1871 – 1 May 1917) was a Uruguayan essayist. He cultivated an epistolary relationship with important Hispanic thinkers of that time, Leopoldo Alas (Clarín) in Spain, José de la Riva-Agüero in Peru, and, most importantly, with Rubén Darío, the most influential Latin American poet to date, the founder of modernismo. As a result of his refined prose style and the modernista ideology he pushed, Rodó is today considered the preeminent theorist of the modernista school of literature.

Rodó is best known for his essay Ariel (1900), drawn from The Tempest, in which Ariel represents the positive, and Caliban represents the negative tendencies in human nature, and they debate the future course of history, in what Rodó intended to be a secular sermon to Latin American youth, championing the cause of the classical western tradition. What Rodó was afraid of was the debilitating effect of working individuals' limited existence doing the same work, over and over again, never having time to develop the spirit. Parque Rodó, one of the main parks in Montevideo, was named after him.

For more than a century now, Ariel has been an influential essay in Latin American letters and culture due to a combination of specific cultural, literary, and political circumstances, as well as for its adherence to Classical values and its denunciation of utilitarianism and what Rodó called "nordomanía" (explained below).

== Literary characteristics ==
Ariel belongs to the movement known as modernismo, characterized by its elegance, artistic prose, and worldly references and allusions. Even though it is an essay, its ideas are expressed through Prospero's narrative voice. Prospero, the teacher, and Ariel are references to the characters in William Shakespeare's The Tempest, and the use of their names is an example of modernismo's desire for cosmopolitism. In Ariel, Prospero's seminar includes both famous and lesser-known European authors. He makes frequent reference to Goethe, Gaston Deschamps, St. Francis of Assisi, Schiller, and Guyau. Prospero also focuses on locations such as Ancient Greece, and he emphasizes Hellenic beauty as the only ideal worthy of imitation. Rodó uses Ariel as a metaphor that symbolizes beauty, the spirit, and that which is good. The opposite of Ariel is the utilitarian, symbolized by Caliban, and he cites positivismo and nordomanía as two reasons why this movement has gained popularity. Ariel is structurally based on binary opposition, and the figures of Ariel and Caliban are diametrically opposed.

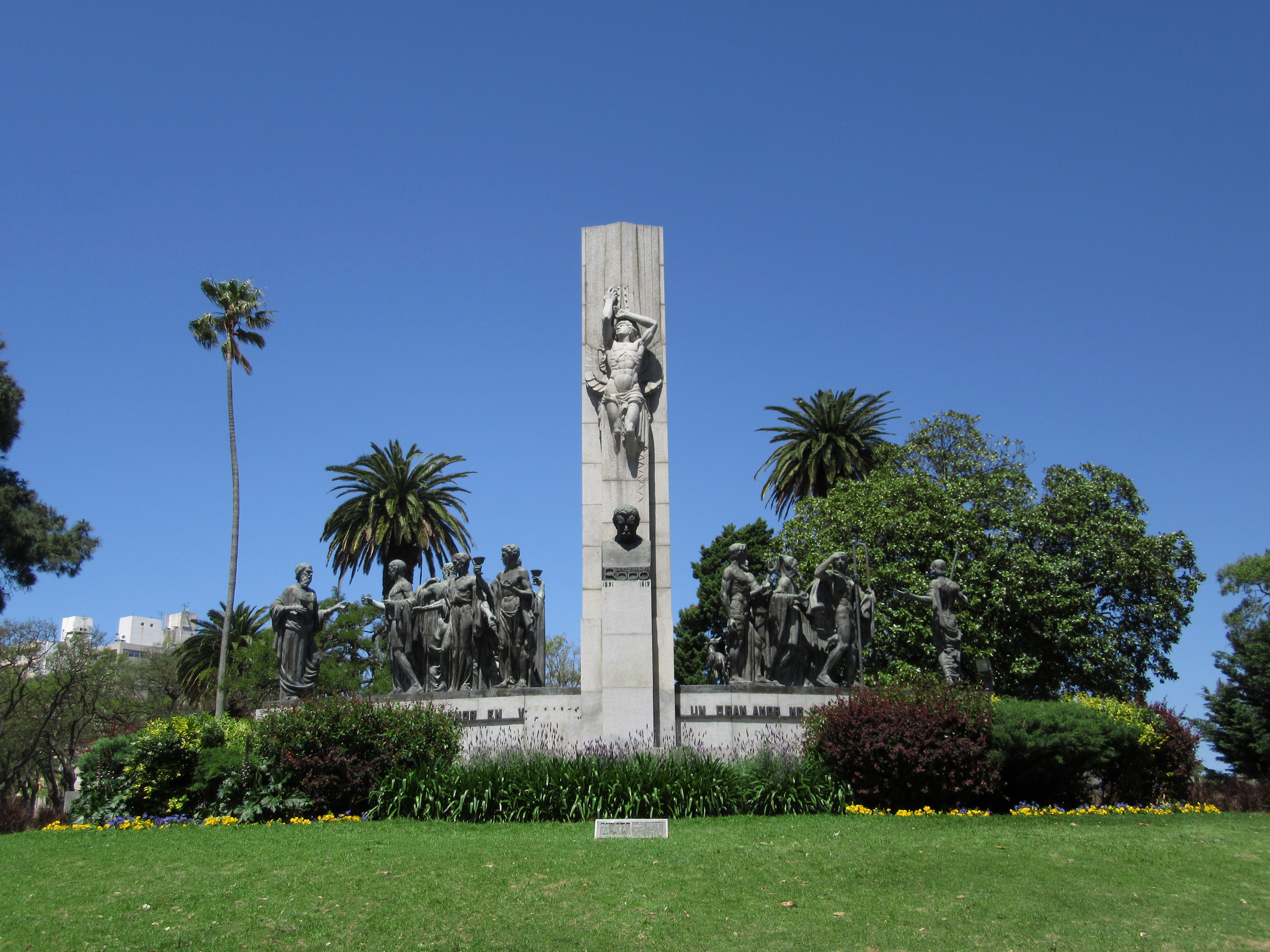
Monument to José Enrique Rodó in Parque Rodó

== Classical culture ==
In the foundational essay Ariel (1900), Rodó surveys the socio-political situation that Latin America faced at the end of the 19th century following the aftermath of the Spanish–American War. He posits that the rapid adoption of utilitarianism relies heavily on hyper-specialization and materialism, which consequently stunts and devalues the holistic "wealth of our minds." Rodó cautions that such purely economic and transactional societal practices will ultimately fracture and compromise the human spirit.

To revive this cultural spirit, Rodó proposes a strict adherence to the aesthetic and philosophical ideals of ancient Greek and Roman cultures. He asserts that both classical realms embody an essential, universal sense of transcendent beauty and, most importantly, collectively recognize the deep significance of dedicating oneself to disinterested intellectual and artistic pursuits. Within this framework, art becomes a vital form of lifelong learning that actively nurtures, balances, and enriches the spirit while directly counteracting the limitations of utilitarianism.

== Denunciation of utilitarianism ==
Rodó denounced pragmatic utilitarianism, i.e. the philosophical movement that considered utility as the way to bring the most happiness to all those affected by it: “the name Ariel means the affirming of an idealist sense of life against the limitations of utilitarianism”. He furthers his argument by stating that utilitarianism causes certain individuals to become specialized in very specific fields and as an effect of such specialization, they end up receiving an incomplete, deformed education. Rodó argues that due to specialization, an individual could be a genius in one aspect of life and completely inept in another. Rodó describes this as the mutilation of the person, because without a general understanding of life through knowledge, the person is no longer complete. The specialization of jobs causes societies to become underdeveloped as opposed to evolving towards maturity. It is this specialization that causes societies to arrive at mediocrity, and as Rodó informs us, another culprit of mediocrity is democracy as it is applied today. This is a strong statement, and Rodó justifies it by clarifying that because democratic societies give power to the masses, whom he deems less capable of making good decisions; but he is not against democracy but rather shows many ways in which its weak points can be strengthened, pointing for instance at the importance of the most capable educating the rest of society to pull the average upwards instead of letting the trend be the opposite.

== The concept of "nordomanía" ==
Rodó warns against "nordomanía," or the attraction of North America, and yankee materialism. However, this is only a hegemonical trend in the Nordamerica -compárese con nordomanía- because, as tell us Rodó, in his essay Rubén Darío. His literary personality. His last work, one of the manners to be with an original style, in agreement to the homeland, is the refractive from Whitman. The other is the reflex: the poet inspired by nature [Rodó, José Enrique. (1899). La Vida Nueva II. Rubén Darío. Su personalidad. Su última obra. Montevideo: Imprenta de Dornaleche y Reyes]. His thought reflects on history, when the United States was growing in the Western Hemisphere, especially in Latin America early in the 20th Century. Rodó echoes the importance of regional identity and how it should be rooted deeply into every country. However, to create and maintain regional identity proves difficult at times due to outside cultural and economic influence. There were many examples in Rodó's immediate past, mainly the Spanish–American War of 1898. Rodó posits that even though outside influence from other countries may be beneficial, it might destroy the principles on which that particular country or region were based from their origin. This is why Rodó argues that it is the responsibility of Spanish-American youth to help form and maintain regional and cultural identity to the best of its potential.

== Works ==
- La novela nueva (1897)
- El que vendrá (1897)
- Rubén Darío (1899)
- Ariel (1900)
- Liberalismo y jacobinismo (Montevideo, 1906)
- Motivos de Proteo (Montevideo, 1909)
- El mirador de Próspero (Montevideo, 1913)
- Cinco ensayos: Montalvo - Ariel - Bolívar - Rubén Darío - Liberalismo y Jacobinismo (Madrid: Editorial América, 1915)
- El camino de Paros (1918)
- Hombres de América: (Juan Montalvo - Simón Bolívar - Rubén Darío) (1920)
- Nuevos motivos de Proteo (1927)
- Últimos motivos de Proteo (1932)

== See also ==
- Alfred Fouillée
- Aneurin Bevan
- Caliban

== Secondary reading ==
- Antuña, José. "Rodó's Ariel". Américas 13.3 (March 1961): 32–34.
- Aronna, Michael. "José Enrique Rodó's 'Ariel': The Therapeutic Program for Pan American Recovery", in "Pueblos enfermos": The Discourse of Illness in the Turn-of-the-Century Spanish American Essay. Chapel Hill: North Carolina Studies in the Romance Languages and Literatures, 1999: 87–134.
- Bachellier, C. C. "An Introduction for Studies on Rodó". Hispania 46.4 (December 1963): 764–769.
- Brotherston, Gordon. "The Literary World of José Enrique Rodó (1871–1917)". En Homenaje a Luis Alberto Sánchez. Eds. Víctor Berger y Robert G. Mead, Jr. Madrid: Editorial Ínsula, 1983: 95–103.
- Earle, Peter G. "Utopía, Univerópolis, Macondo". Hispanic Review 50 (1982): 143–157.
- Earle, Peter G. "José Enrique Rodó". Latin American Writers. Vol. II. Ed. Solé/Abreu. NY: Charles Scribner's Sons, 1989: II: 447–455.
- González Echeverría, Roberto. "The Case of the Speaking Statue: Ariel and the Magisterial Rhetoric of the Latin American Essay". The Voice of the Masters: Writing and Authority in Modern Latin American Literature. Austin: University of Texas Press, 1985: 8–32.
- Jauregui, Carlos. "Los monstruos del latinoamericanismo arielista: variaciones del apetito en la periferia (neo)colonial" (capitulo 4) de "Canibalia." Madrid: Iberoamericana 2008. 311-391.
- Miller, Nicola. In the Shadow of the State: Intellectuals and the Quest for National Identity in Twentieth-Century Latin America. London: Verso, 1999: 96–114.
- Pereyra-Suárez, Esther. "José Enrique Rodó y la selección en la democracia". Hispania 58.2 (1975): 346–350.
- Rodríguez Monegal, Emir. "Sobre el Anti-imperialismo de Rodó". Revista Iberoamericana 80, Vol 38 (1972): 495–501.
- Rodríguez Monegal, Emir. "La utopía modernista: el mito del nuevo y el viejo mundo en Darío y Rodó". Revista Iberoamericana 46 (1980): 427–442.
- Sánchez, Luis Alberto. Escritores representativos de América. Primera serie. Segunda edición. 3 tomos. Madrid: Gredos, 1963: Tomo III, "José Enrique Rodó", 77–94.
- San Román, Gustavo. A Companion to José Enrique Rodó. Woodbridge: Tamesis, 2018.
- Symington, James W. "Echoes of Rodó". Américas 20.3 (March 1968): 8–13.
- Symington, James W. "Learn Latin America's Culture". New York Times (Friday, September 23, 1983): Editorial Page.
- Tiempo, César. "Vistazo a José Enrique Rodó". Hispania 39.3 (1956): 269–274.
- Ward, Thomas. "Rodó y las 'jerarquías imperativas". En La resistencia cultural: la nación en el ensayo de las Américas. Lima: Universidad Ricardo Palma, 2004: 72–85.
- Ward, Thomas. "El concepto krausista de la belleza en Rodó" y "La belleza como solución", En La teoría literaria: romanticismo, krausismo y modernismo ante la 'globalización' industrial. University, MS: University of Mississippi, "Romance Monographs", 2004: 70–82.
