= Arturo Ardao =

Uruguayan philosopher and historian of ideas (1912–2003)

- Born: 27 September 1912; Minas, Uruguay
- Died: 22 September 2003 (aged 90); Montevideo, Uruguay
- Education: Universidad de la República
- Occupations: philosopher, professor, historian
- Awards: Premio Bartolomé Hidalgo; Premios Morosoli

Arturo Ardao (27 September 1912 – 22 September 2003) was a Uruguayan philosopher and historian of ideas.

From 1968 to 1972 he was dean of the Faculty of Humanities. Before the Military Coup in 1973, he was forced into exile in Venezuela, where he continued his academic activity as professor at the Simón Bolívar University in Caracas. In addition, he participates as researcher at the Center for Latin American Studies Rómulo Gallegos.

He contributed to the weekly newspaper Marcha.

== Works ==
- 1937, Vida de Basilio Muñoz (with Julio Castro. Montevideo)
- 1945, Filosofía pre-universitaria en el Uruguay (Montevideo)
- Espiritualismo y positivismo (Mexico, 1950)
- 1951, Batlle y Ordóñez y el positivismo filosófico (Número, Montevideo)
- 1956, La filosofía del Uruguay del siglo XX (Mexico)
- 1962, Racionalismo y Liberalismo en el Uruguay (Montevideo)
- 1962, La filosofía polémica de Feijóo. (Buenos Aires)
- 1963, Filosofía en lengua española (Montevideo)
- 1971, Etapas de la inteligencia uruguaya (Montevideo)
- 1976, Espacio e Inteligencia (Caracas)
- 1980, Génesis de la idea y el nombre de América Latina (Caracas)
- 1991, La inteligencia latinoamericana (Montevideo)
- 1992, España en el origen del nombre América Latina (Montevideo)
- 1997, Lógica y metafísica en Feijóo (Montevideo)
- 2000, La lógica de la razón y la lógica de la inteligencia (Montevideo)
- Feijóo, Fundador de la Filosofía de lengua española.
