= List of ministers of foreign relations of Uruguay =

This article lists the ministers of foreign relations of Uruguay since 1828:

Minister	Term of office
Juan Francisco Giró	December 22, 1828 – August 27, 1829
Fructuoso Rivera	December 16, 1829 – January 18, 1830
Juan Antonio Lavalleja	January 18, 1830 – March 11, 1830
José Longinos Ellauri	March 11, 1830 – April 20, 1830
Juan Francisco Giró	April 20, 1830 – October 24, 1830
José Longinos Ellauri	November 11, 1830 – September 2, 1831
Joaquín Suárez	September 19, 1831 – November 7, 1831
Santiago Vázquez	November 7, 1831 – July 5, 1832
Francisco Joaquín Muñoz	July 5, 1832 – August 16, 1832
Santiago Vázquez	August 16, 1832 – October 9, 1833
Francisco Llambí	October 9, 1833 - December 20, 1833
Lucas J. Obes	December 20, 1833 – January 7, 1835
Francisco Llambí	March 4, 1835 – October 15, 1835
Francisco Llambí	November 16, 1835 – March 27, 1837
Juan Benito Blanco	August 6, 1837 – July 30, 1838
Carlos Jerónimo Villademoros	September 1, 1838 – October 24, 1838
Alejandro Chucarro	October 24, 1838 – November 11, 1838
Foreign Relations Ministers of the Gobierno de la Defensa
Santiago Vázquez	November 11, 1838 – February 6, 1839
José Longinos Ellauri	February 6, 1839 – October 19, 1839
Francisco Antonino Vidal	October 19, 1839 – February 3, 1843
Santiago Vázquez	February 3, 1843 – April 6, 1846
Francisco Magariños	April 6, 1846 – December 21, 1846
Alejandro Chucarro	February 6, 1847 – July 5, 1847
Miguel Barreiro	July 5, 1847 – August 11, 1847
Manuel Herrera y Obes	August 11, 1847 – February 16, 1852
Foreign Relations Ministers of the Gobierno del Cerrito
Carlos Villademoros	February 17, 1843 – April 14, 1843
Carlos Villademoros	May 12, 1843 – October, 1851
Post–War Foreign Relations Ministers
Florentino Castellanos	March 3, 1852 – July 4, 1853
Bernardo Prudencio Berro	July 4, 1853 – September 24, 1853
Juan Carlos Gómez	September 26, 1853 – November 9, 1853
Juan José Aguiar	November 9, 1853 – February 8, 1854
Mateo Magariños Cervantes	March 14, 1854 – November 20, 1854
Francisco Hordeñana	November 20, 1854 – February 17, 1855
Alejandro Chucarro	February 17, 1855 – May 30, 1855
Manuel Herrera y Obes	August 31, 1855 – September 12, 1855
Alfredo Rodríguez	September 28, 1855 – November 13, 1855
Antonio Rodríguez Caballero	December 3, 1855 – January 18, 1856
Alberto Flangini	January 24, 1856 – March 3, 1856
Joaquín Requena	March 20, 1856 – January 4, 1858
Antonio de las Carreras	January 4, 1858 – June 12, 1858
Antonio de las Carreras	July 24, 1859 – March 1, 1860
Eduardo Acevedo	March 8, 1860 – June 3, 1861
Enrique de Arrascaeta	June 20, 1861 – June 23, 1862
Jaime Estrázulas	September 18, 1862 – November 6, 1862
Juan José de Herrera	October 12, 1863 – September 7, 1864
Antonio de las Carreras	September 7, 1864 – February 15, 1865
Carlos de Castro	February 27, 1865 – April 27, 1865
Carlos de Castro	May 20, 1865 – May 15, 1866
José Eugenio Ellauri	March 1, 1868 – March 8, 1868
Alberto Flangini	May 15, 1866 – February 15, 1868
Manuel Herrera y Obes	August 31, 1868 – September 12, 1868
Alejandro Magariños Cervantes	January 14, 1869 – March 12, 1869
Alfredo Rodríguez	June 15, 1869 – August 11, 1870
Manuel Herrera y Obes	September 30, 1870 – February 28, 1872
Ernesto Velazco	February 28, 1872 – July 30, 1872
Julio Herrera y Obes	July 31, 1872 – September 8, 1872
Gregorio Pérez Gomar	March 1, 1873 – January 15, 1875
José Cándido Bustamante	January 15, 1875 – July 31, 1875
Mateo Magariños Cervantes	February 22, 1876 – March 10, 1876
Andrés Lamas	July 31, 1875 – February 22, 1876
Ambrosio Velazco	March 15, 1876 – September 24, 1877
Gualberto Méndez	September 24, 1877 – March 13, 1880
Joaquín Requena y García	March 20, 1880 – March 26, 1881
José Vázquez Sagastume	August 8, 1881 – February 28, 1882
Manuel Herrera y Obes	March 8, 1882 – October 11, 1882
Manuel Herrera y Obes	December 12, 1882 – March 1, 1886
Manuel Herrera y Obes	May 28, 1886 – October 30, 1886
Juan Carlos Blanco Fernández	November 3, 1886 – December 23, 1886
Domingo Mendilaharsu	December 31, 1886 – April 4, 1887
Ildefonso García Lagos	July 9, 1887 – November 21, 1889
Blas Vidal	March 11, 1890 – December 17, 1890
Manuel Herrero y Espinosa	March 2, 1891 – October 21, 1891
Manuel Herrero y Espinosa	February 22, 1892 – November 14, 1893
Luis Piñeyro del Campo	March 29, 1894 – August 3, 1894
Jaime Estrázulas	September 17, 1894 – September 26, 1896
Mariano Ferreira	August 28, 1897 – December 1, 1897
Joaquín de Salterain	December 1, 1897 – July 21, 1898
Domingo Mendilaharsu	August 3, 1898 - September 10, 1898
Manuel Herrero y Espinosa	March 4, 1899 – June 4, 1901
Germán Roosen	June 19, 1901 – February 25, 1903
José Romeu	March 5, 1903 – March 1, 1907
Jacobo Varela Acevedo	March 16, 1907 – November 14, 1907
Antonio Bachini	December 2, 1907 – October 18, 1910
José Romeu	March 4, 1911 – June 17, 1913
Emilio Barbaroux	June 17, 1913 – February 13, 1914
Manuel Buenaventura Otero	March 2, 1915 – August 14, 1916
Baltasar Brum	September 4, 1916 – February 19, 1919
Daniel Muñoz	February 19, 1919 – August 1, 1919
Juan Antonio Buero	March 1, 1919 – March 1, 1923
Pedro Manini Ríos	March 1, 1923 – December 19, 1924
Juan Carlos Blanco Acevedo	December 22, 1924 – July 2, 1926
Rufino T. Domínguez	March 1, 1927 – March 1, 1931
Juan Carlos Blanco Acevedo	March 1, 1931 – February 13, 1933
Alberto Mañé	February 13, 1933 – May 17, 1934
Juan José de Arteaga	May 18, 1934 – October 4, 1934
Juan José de Arteaga	November 6, 1934 – March 19, 1935
José Espalter	March 19, 1935 – June 1, 1938
Alberto Guani	June 19, 1938 – January 10, 1942
Alberto Guani	February 18, 1942 – January 16, 1943
Alberto Guani	February 25, 1943 – February 26, 1943
José Serrato	March 1, 1943 – October 4, 1945
Eduardo Rodríguez Larreta	October 4, 1945 – March 1, 1947
Mateo Marques Castro	March 1, 1947 – December 12, 1947
Daniel Castellanos	December 31, 1947 – August 12, 1949
César Charlone	August 12, 1949 – November 23, 1950
Alberto Domínguez Cámpora	November 23, 1950 – March 1, 1952
Daniel Castellanos	March 1, 1952 – April 22, 1952
Fructuoso Pittaluga	April 22, 1952 – February 23, 1955
Santiago Rompani	March 2, 1955 – May 16, 1956
Francisco Gamarra	May 16, 1956 – June 6, 1957
Óscar Secco Ellauri	June 6, 1957 – March 1, 1959
Homero Martínez Montero	March 1, 1959 – March 1, 1963
Alejandro Zorrilla de San Martín	March 1, 1963 – February 11, 1965
Luis Vidal Zaglio	February 11, 1965 – March 1, 1967
Héctor Luisi	March 1, 1967 – April 25, 1968
Venancio Flores	May 3, 1968 – April 1, 1970
Jorge Peirano Facio	April 1, 1970 – April 1, 1971
José Antonio Mora	April 1, 1971 – June 2, 1972
Juan Carlos Blanco Estradé	October 31, 1972 – December 23, 1976
Alejandro Rovira	December 23, 1976 – July 6, 1978
Adolfo Folle Martínez	July 6, 1978 – February 16, 1981
Estanislao Valdés Otero	February 17, 1981 – September 2, 1982
Carlos A. Maeso	September 2, 1982 – March 1, 1985
Enrique Iglesias	March 1, 1985 – February 22, 1988
Luis Barrios Tassano	February 22, 1988 – February 28, 1990
Héctor Gros Espiell	March 1, 1990 – April 4, 1993
Sergio Abreu Bonilla	April 4, 1993 – March 1, 1995
Álvaro Ramos Trigo	March 1, 1995 – February 1, 1998
Didier Opertti Badán	February 2, 1998 – March 1, 2005
Reinaldo Gargano	March 1, 2005 – March 3, 2008
Gonzalo Fernández	March 3, 2008 – August 31, 2009
Pedro Vaz	August 31, 2009 – March 1, 2010
Luis Almagro	March 1, 2010 – March 1, 2015
Rodolfo Nin Novoa	March 1, 2015 – March 1, 2020
Ernesto Talvi	March 1, 2020 – July 1, 2020
Francisco Bustillo	July 6, 2020 – November 1, 2023
Omar Paganini	November 6, 2023 – March 1, 2025
Mario Lubetkin	March 1, 2025 – present
