= List of ambassadors of Spain to Uruguay =

Ambassador of Spain to Uruguay
- Coat of arms of Spain
- Incumbent; Javier Salido Ortiz since 22 January 2025
- Ministry of Foreign Affairs; Secretariat of State for Ibero-America
- Style: The Most Excellent
- Residence: Montevideo
- Nominator: The Foreign Minister
- Appointer: The Monarch
- Term length: At the government's pleasure
- Inaugural holder: Pablo Soler y Guardiola
- Formation: 1953
- Website: Mission of Spain to Uruguay

The ambassador of Spain to Uruguay is the official representative of the Kingdom of Spain to the Oriental Republic of Uruguay. In addition to the Embassy, Spain has a Consulate General in Montevideo.

Spain recognized Uruguay as an independent state in 1845, supporting Manuel Oribe in the Uruguayan Civil War. A legation was established in Montevideo, arriving the first diplomats, led by Carlos Creus y Camps, consul general and chargé d'affaires, on 20 October 1845. The first peace and friendship treaty was signed in 1870 and, in 1953, the legation in the Uruguayan capital was elevated to the rank of Embassy.

== List of ambassadors ==
Ambassador	Rank	Term	Nominated by	Appointed by	Accredited to
Carlos Creus y Camps	Chargé d'affaires	1845–1851		Isabella II	Manuel Oribe
Jacinto Albístur	Chargé d'affaires	1851		Isabella II	Manuel Oribe
José María de Alós	Chargé d'affaires	1851–1854	The Marquess of Miraflores	Isabella II	Manuel Oribe
Antonio Cuyás y Sampere	Chargé d'affaires	1854–1855		Isabella II	
Jacinto Albístur (Note: Accredited to all the Río de la Plata states.)	Minister	1855–1859	Claudio Antón de Luzuriaga	Isabella II	Venancio Flores
Carlos Creus y Camps	Chargé d'affaires	1859–1861		Isabella II	
Carlos Creus y Camps	Minister	1861–1864		Isabella II	Bernardo Prudencio Berro
Juan Pío de Montúfar y García-Infante, Marquess of Selva Alegre	Minister	1864	Joaquín Francisco Pacheco	Isabella II	Venancio Flores
Carlos Creus y Camps	Minister	1864–1873	Alejandro Llorente y Lannas	Isabella II	Atanasio Aguirre
José Mellado	Minister	1873–1874	José Muro y López-Salgado	Francesc Pi i Margall	
Tiburcio Rodríguez y Muñoz	Minister	1874–1875	Augusto Ulloa y Castañón	The Duke of the Tower	José Eugenio Ellauri
Mariano Potestad	Chargé d'affaires	1875–1877	Alejandro de Castro y Casal	Alfonso XII	Pedro Varela
Lorenzo de Castellanos	Chargé d'affaires	1877–1879	Manuel Silvela y Le Vielleuze	Alfonso XII	Lorenzo Latorre
Manuel Llorente y Vázquez	Chargé d'affaires	1879–1883		Alfonso XII	Lorenzo Latorre
Emilio de Ojeda y Perpiñán	Minister	1883–1884		Alfonso XII	Máximo Santos
Manuel del Palacio	Minister	1884–1886	The Marquess of the Pazo de la Merced	Alfonso XII	Máximo Santos
Julio de Arellano y Arróspide	Minister	1886–1888	The Marquess of the Pazo de la Merced	Alfonso XII	Francisco Antonino Vidal
Enrique Dupuy de Lôme	Minister	1888–1890	The Marquess of Vega de Armijo	Alfonso XIII	Máximo Tajes
José Brunetti y Gayoso, Duke of Arcos	Minister	1890–1891	The Duke of Tetuán	Alfonso XIII	Julio Herrera y Obes
José Delavat y Áreas	Minister	1891		Alfonso XIII	Julio Herrera y Obes
José de la Rica y Calvo	Minister	1891–1894		Alfonso XIII	Julio Herrera y Obes
Ramiro Gil y Uribarri Ossorio	Minister	1894–1898	Segismundo Moret	Alfonso XIII	Juan Idiarte Borda
Juan Pérez-Caballero y Ferrer	Minister	1898–1900	The Duke of Almodóvar	Alfonso XIII	Juan Lindolfo Cuestas
Felipe García-Ontiveros y Serrano	Minister	1900–1905		Alfonso XIII	Juan Lindolfo Cuestas
Fernando Osorio y Elola	Minister	1905–1907		Alfonso XIII	José Batlle y Ordóñez
Germán María de Ory y Morey	Minister	1907–1910	Juan Pérez-Caballero y Ferrer	Alfonso XIII	Claudio Williman
Joaquín Gutiérrez Valcárcel, Marquess of Medina	Minister	1911–1914	The Marquess of Alhucemas	Alfonso XIII	Claudio Williman
Silvio Fernández-Vallín y Alfonso	Minister	1914–1919	The Duke of Ripalda	Alfonso XIII	José Batlle y Ordóñez
Tomás de Rueda y Osborne, Viscount of Fuente de Doña María	Minister	1919–1922	The Count of Romanones	Alfonso XIII	Baltasar Brum
Manuel García de Acilu y Benito	Minister	1922–1925	Joaquín Fernández Prida	Alfonso XIII	Baltasar Brum
Gonzalo del Río y García	Minister	1925–1926		Alfonso XIII	José Serrato
Alfonso Danvila	Minister	1926–1930	The Viscount of Santa Clara de Avedillo	Alfonso XIII	José Serrato
Antonio Pla y da Folgueira	Minister	1930–1933	The Duke of Alba	Alfonso XIII	Juan Campisteguy
Enrique Díez Canedo	Minister	1933–1934	Luis de Zulueta	Niceto Alcalá-Zamora	Gabriel Terra
Antonio de la Cruz Marín	Minister	1934	Juan José Rocha García	Niceto Alcalá-Zamora	Gabriel Terra
Carlos Malagarriga y Munué	Minister	1934–1935	Juan José Rocha García	Niceto Alcalá-Zamora	Gabriel Terra
Plácido Álvarez-Buylla	Minister	1935–1936	Juan José Rocha García	Niceto Alcalá-Zamora	Gabriel Terra
Augusto Barcia Trelles	Minister	1936–1939	Bernardo Giner de los Ríos	Manuel Azaña	Gabriel Terra
José María Doussinague	Minister	1939–1940	Francisco Gómez-Jordana Sousa	Francisco Franco	Alfredo Baldomir
Luis Martínez de Irujo y Caro	Minister	1940–1943	Juan Luis Beigbeder	Francisco Franco	Alfredo Baldomir
Teodomiro de Aguilar y Salas	Minister	1943–1944	Francisco Gómez-Jordana Sousa	Francisco Franco	Juan José de Amézaga
Juan Pablo de Lojendio e Irure	Minister	1944–1951	José Félix de Lequerica y Erquiza	Francisco Franco	Juan José de Amézaga
Carlos Cañal y Gómez-Imaz, Marquess of Saavedra	Minister	1951–1953	Alberto Martín-Artajo	Francisco Franco	Andrés Martínez Trueba
Carlos Cañal y Gómez-Imaz, Marquess of Saavedra	Ambassador	1953–1959	Alberto Martín-Artajo	Francisco Franco	Andrés Martínez Trueba
Francisco Javier Conde	Ambassador	1959–1964	Fernando María Castiella	Francisco Franco	Martín Echegoyen
Rafael Ferrer Sagreras	Ambassador	1964–1970	Fernando María Castiella	Francisco Franco	Luis Giannattasio
Juan Serrat y Valera	Ambassador	1970–1972	Gregorio López-Bravo	Francisco Franco	Jorge Pacheco Areco
Ramón Sáenz de Heredia y de Manzanos	Ambassador	1972–1976	Gregorio López-Bravo	Francisco Franco	Juan María Bordaberry
Román Oyarzun Marchesi	Ambassador	1976–1980	Adolfo Martín-Gamero (acting)	Juan Carlos I	Juan María Bordaberry
Rafael Gómez-Jordana y Prats	Ambassador	1980–1983	José Pedro Pérez-Llorca	Juan Carlos I	Aparicio Méndez
Félix Guillermo Fernández-Shaw Baldasano	Ambassador	1983–1987	Fernando Morán	Juan Carlos I	Gregorio Conrado Álvarez
Federico Garayalde Emparan	Ambassador	1988–1991	Francisco Fernández Ordóñez	Juan Carlos I	Julio María Sanguinetti
Salvador Bermúdez de Castro y Bernales, Marquess of Lema	Ambassador	1991–1995	Francisco Fernández Ordóñez	Juan Carlos I	Luis Alberto Lacalle
Ricardo Peidró	Ambassador	1995–1996	Javier Solana	Juan Carlos I	Julio María Sanguinetti
Joaquín María de Arístegui Laborde	Ambassador	1996–2001	Abel Matutes	Juan Carlos I	Julio María Sanguinetti
Fernando Martínez Westerhausen	Ambassador	2001–2004	Josep Piqué	Juan Carlos I	Jorge Batlle
Fernando Valderrama Pareja	Ambassador	2004–2008	Miguel Ángel Moratinos	Juan Carlos I	Jorge Batlle
Aurora Díaz-Rato Revuelta	Ambassador	2008–2012	Miguel Ángel Moratinos	Juan Carlos I	Tabaré Vázquez
Roberto Varela	Ambassador	2012–2017	José Manuel García-Margallo	Juan Carlos I	José Mujica
Javier Sangro	Ambassador	2017–2019	Alfonso Dastis	Felipe VI	Tabaré Vázquez
José Javier Gómez-Llera	Ambassador	2019–2022	Josep Borrell	Felipe VI	Tabaré Vázquez
Santiago Jiménez Martín	Ambassador	2022–2025	José Manuel Albares	Felipe VI	Luis Lacalle Pou
Javier Salido Ortiz	Ambassador	2025–pres.	José Manuel Albares	Felipe VI	Luis Lacalle Pou

== See also ==
- Spain–Uruguay relations
