= Ellauri =

Ellauri is a surname. Notable people with the surname include:

- José Eugenio Ellauri (1834–1894), Uruguayan politician, son of José
- José Longinos Ellauri (1789–1867), Uruguayan politician
- Oscar Secco Ellauri (1904–1990), Uruguayan politician and historian
