= Revolution of Quebracho =

- Part of Uruguayan Civil War
Date	March 30 and 31, 1886
Location	Quebracho, Uruguay
Result	Government troops victory

Belligerents
Partido Colorado; Partido Blanco; Partido Constitucional	Gobierno Uruguayo

Commanders and leaders
Lorenzo Batlle; Juan José de Herrera; Juan Campisteguy; José Miguel Arredondo; Claudio Williman	Máximo Santos; Máximo Tajes; Francisco Antonino Vidal

Units involved
Ejército Revolucionario	Ejército Uruguayo

Casualties and losses
800	?

Revolution of Quebracho was a civil-military uprising of the Colorado Party and the Blanco Party against the presidency of Máximo Santos. It took place in March 1886 in Quebracho, Paysandú Department, Banda Oriental del Uruguay.

Among the revolutionaries were Lorenzo Batlle, Juan Campisteguy and Claudio Williman, future presidents of Uruguay. The preparations for this revolution took place in Buenos Aires and Entre Ríos, when members of the Colorado Party, the Blanco Party, and the Constitutional party agreed to organize an armed uprising against the Santos presidency.

This conflict culminated after the Battle of Soto, in which government troops under the command of General Máximo Tajes, defeated the revolutionary coalition.
