= List of cemeteries in Uruguay =

List of cemeteries in Uruguay.

== Montevideo Department ==
- British Cemetery
- Buceo Cemetery
- Central Cemetery
- Cerro Cemetery
- Norte Cemetery
- Paso Molino Cemetery

== Artigas Department ==
- Bella Unión Cemetery
- Central Cemetery

== Canelones Department ==
- Atlántida Cemetery
- Jewish Cemetery
- Las Piedras Municipal Cemetery
- Los Fresnos de Carrasco
- Migues Cemetery
- Pando Cemetery
- Parque del Recuerdo
- Parque del Reencuentro
- Parque Martinelli de Carrasco
- San Antonio Cemetery
- San Jacinto Cemetery
- San Ramón Cemetery
- Santa Lucía Cemetery
- Santa Rosa Cemetery
- Sauce Cemetery
- Soca Cemetery
- Tala Cemetery

== Cerro Largo Department ==
- Aceguá Cemetery
- Fraile Muerto Cemetery
- Melo Cemetery

== Colonia Department ==
- Carmelo Cemetery
- Colonia del Sacramento Cemetery
- Colonia Suiza Cemetery
- Evangelical Cemetery
- Tarariras Cemetery

== Durazno Department ==
- Carlos Reyles Cemetery
- Durazno Cemetery
- La Paloma Cemetery
- Sarandí del Yi Cemetery
- Villa del Carmen Cemetery

== Flores Department ==
- Trinidad Cemetery

== Florida Department ==
- Capilla del Sauce Cemetery
- Casupá Cemetery
- Chamizo Cemetery
- Florida Cemetery

== Lavalleja Department ==
- Cementerio del Este, Minas
- Mariscala Cemetery
- Pirarajá Cemetery
- Solís de Mataojo Cemetery

== Maldonado Department ==
- Municipal Cemetery
- Pan de Azúcar Cemetery
- San Carlos Cemetery

== Paysandú Department ==
- Guichón Cemetery
- Paysandú Cemetery
- Perpetuidad Cemetery
- Quebracho Cemetery

== Río Negro Department ==
- Fray Bentos Cemetery
- Nuevo Berlín Cemetery
- San Javier Cemetery
- Young Local Cemetery

== Rivera Department ==
- Central Cemetery
- Lagunón Cemetery
- Parque Homero Pereira

== Rocha Department ==
- Castillos Cemetery
- Chuy Cemetery
- Lascano Cemetery
- Rocha Cemetery

== Salto Department ==
- Belén Cemetery
- Central Cemetery
- Los Azahares

== San José Department ==
- Municipal Cemetery
- Mater Terra

== Soriano Department ==
- Cardona Cemetery
- Juan Lacaze Cemetery
- Municipal Cemetery

== Tacuarembó Department ==
- Curtina Cemetery
- Municipal Cemetery
- San Gregorio de Polanco Cemetery
- Tambores Cemetery

== Treinta y Tres Department ==
- Parque Cemetery
- Santa Clara de Olimar Cemetery
- Treinta y Tres Cemetery
