= Parque del Recuerdo =

Parque del Recuerdo (Spanish for "Memory Park") may refer to:

- Parque del Recuerdo (Chile), a group of cemetery parks in Santiago
- Parque del Recuerdo (Uruguay), a private cemetery east of downtown Montevideo in Canelones Department

== See also ==
- Parque del Reencuentro, north of downtown Montevideo in Canelones Department, Uruguay
- Remembrance park, Buenos Aires, Argentina
