= 1908 Uruguayan Senate election =

Senate elections were held in Uruguay on 26 November 1908 to elect 6 of the 19 members of the Senate.

== Results ==
Party	Votes	%	Seats
Colorado Party	5,551	79.36	6
Autonomous List	1,370	19.59	0
Julio Herrera y Obes	74	1.06	0
Total	6,995	100.00	6
Source: Bottinelli et al.
