= Santos Palace =

- Palacio Santos
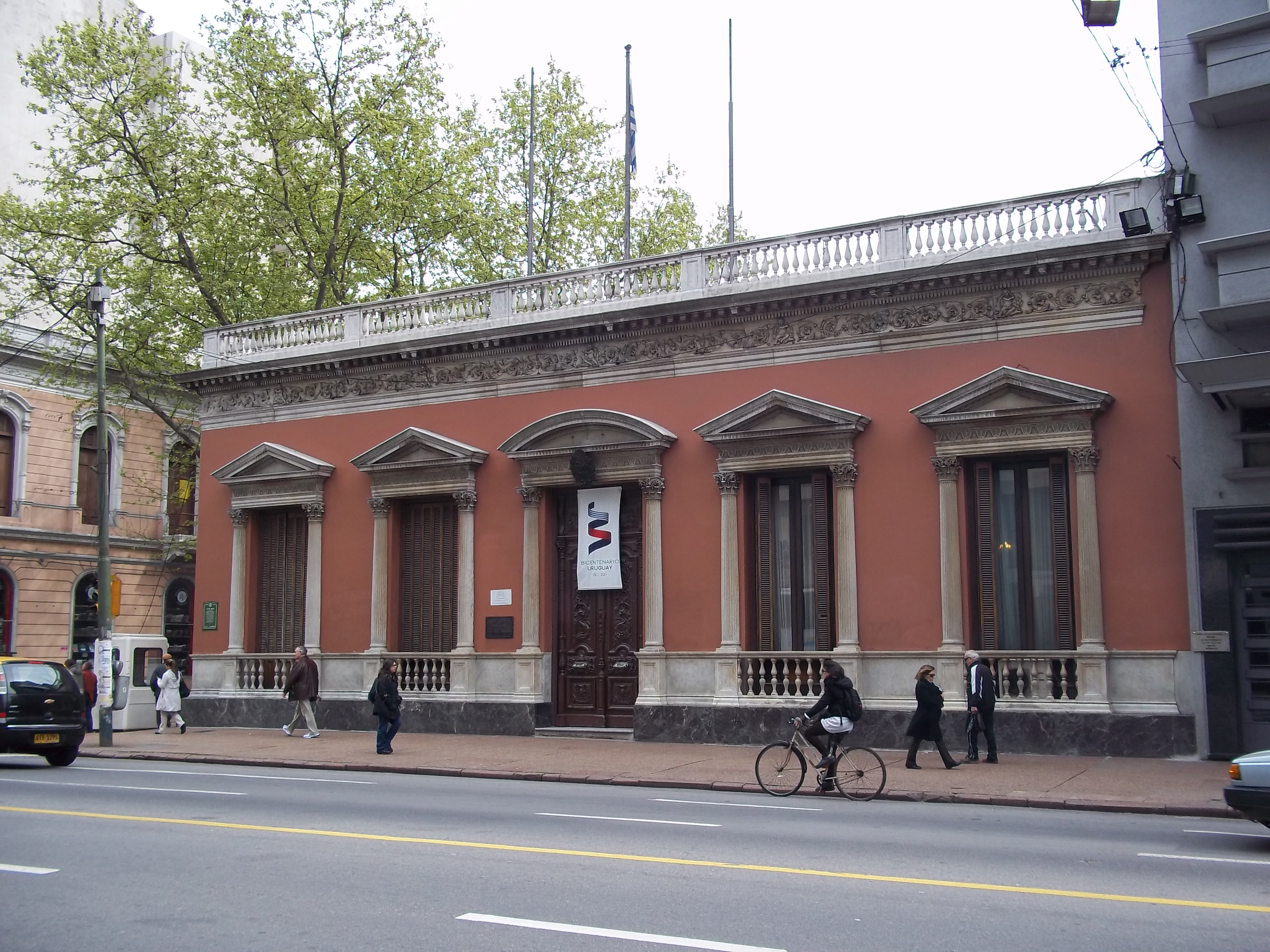
- Interactive map of the Santos Palace area

General information
- Status: Completed
- Architectural style: Neoclassical architecture
- Location: Montevideo, Uruguay
- Coordinates: 34°54′20″S 56°11′24″W
- Construction started: 1881
- Completed: 1886
- Opening: 1886

Design and construction
- Architect: Juan Capurro

The Santos Palace (Spanish: Palacio Santos) is a neoclassical building located in the Centro neighborhood of Montevideo, Uruguay. Built in the 1880s, it serves as the protocol headquarters of the country's Ministry of Foreign Relations.

Originally intended as the residence of President Máximo Santos, after whom it is named, the palace briefly served as the seat of the Uruguayan government from 1931 to 1934, including the period of Gabriel Terra’s rule.

== History ==
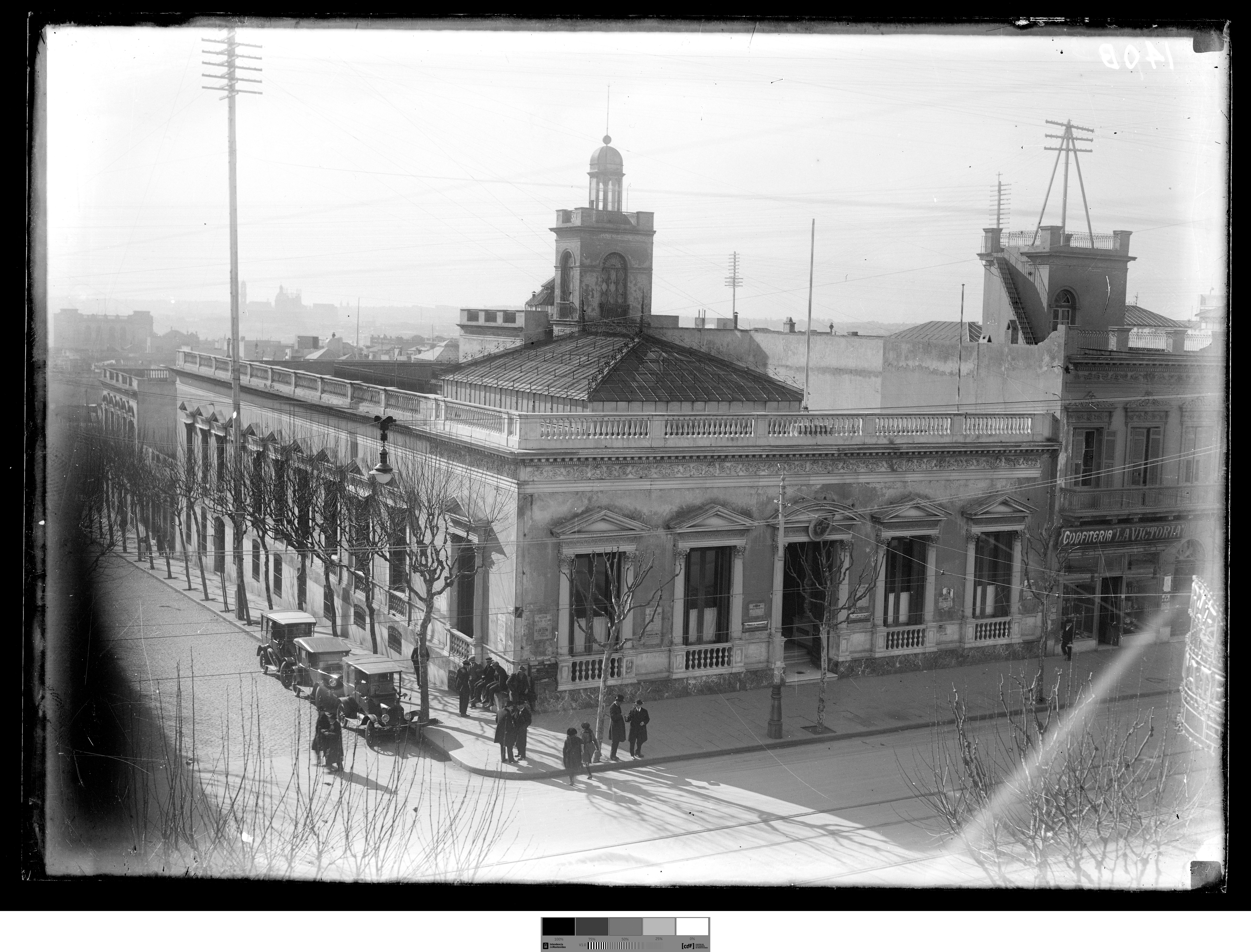
Santos Palace in 1920

The palace was built between 1881 and 1886 for the military officer and politician Máximo Santos, who served as President of Uruguay from 1882 to 1886, during the period of militarism. The architect in charge was Juan A. Capurro, who designed it in a neoclassical style with elements of Italian Renaissance.

The marble, wood, and plasterwork in the building’s interior were crafted by master artisans and students from the School of Arts and Crafts—now known as the University of Labor of Uruguay. Santos used it as a private residence with his wife, Teresa Mascaró Sosa, and their children until his death in 1889. The family alternated their stay between the palace and a country estate on the outskirts of the city, which today houses the Museo de la Memoria.

In 1920, the building was acquired by the Uruguayan state, and in the following years it housed several government offices, including the Ministry of the Interior and the Ministry of Finance. In 1931, President Gabriel Terra moved the presidential office and various departments of the Presidency of the Republic to the palace, where they remained until 1934. In 1955, the building became the headquarters of the Ministry of Foreign Relations, which until then had been located in the Montevideo Cabildo.

== Description ==
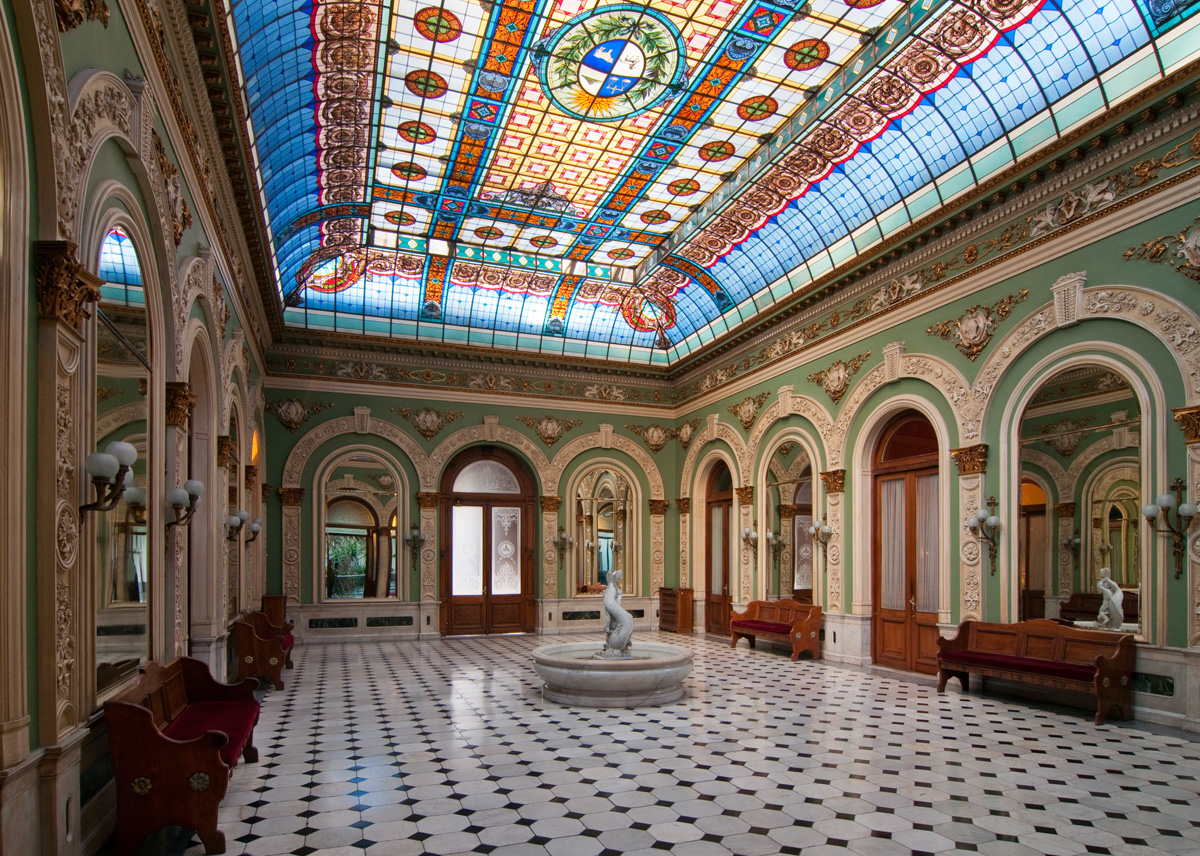
Fountain Courtyard

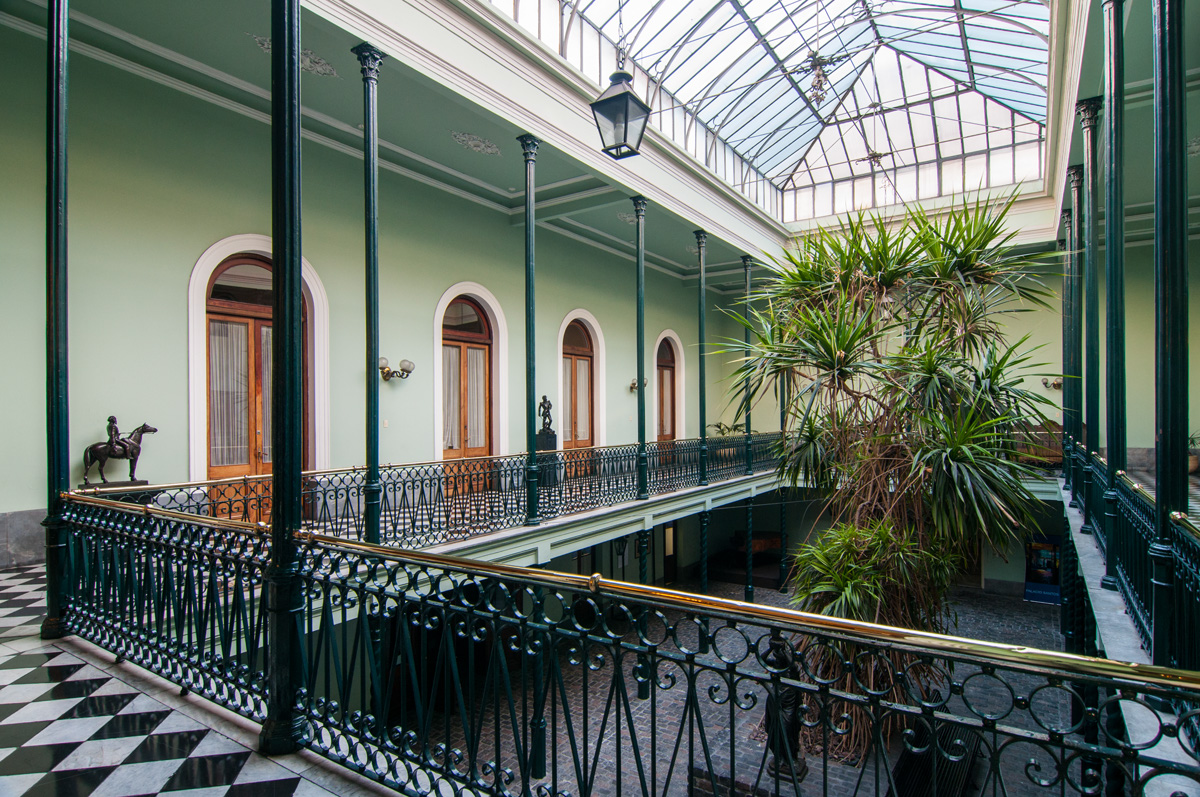
Colonial Courtyard

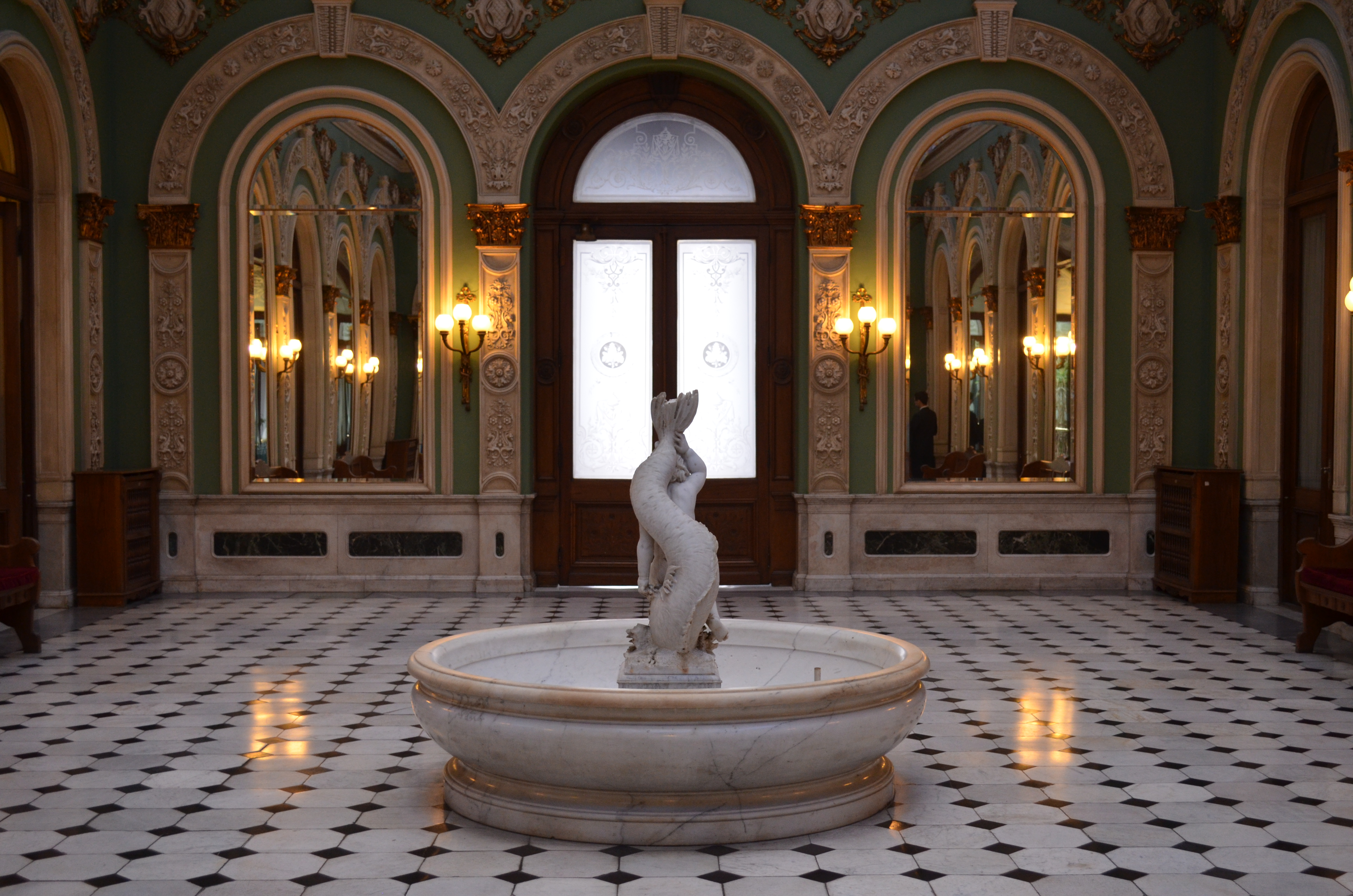
Fountain and statue

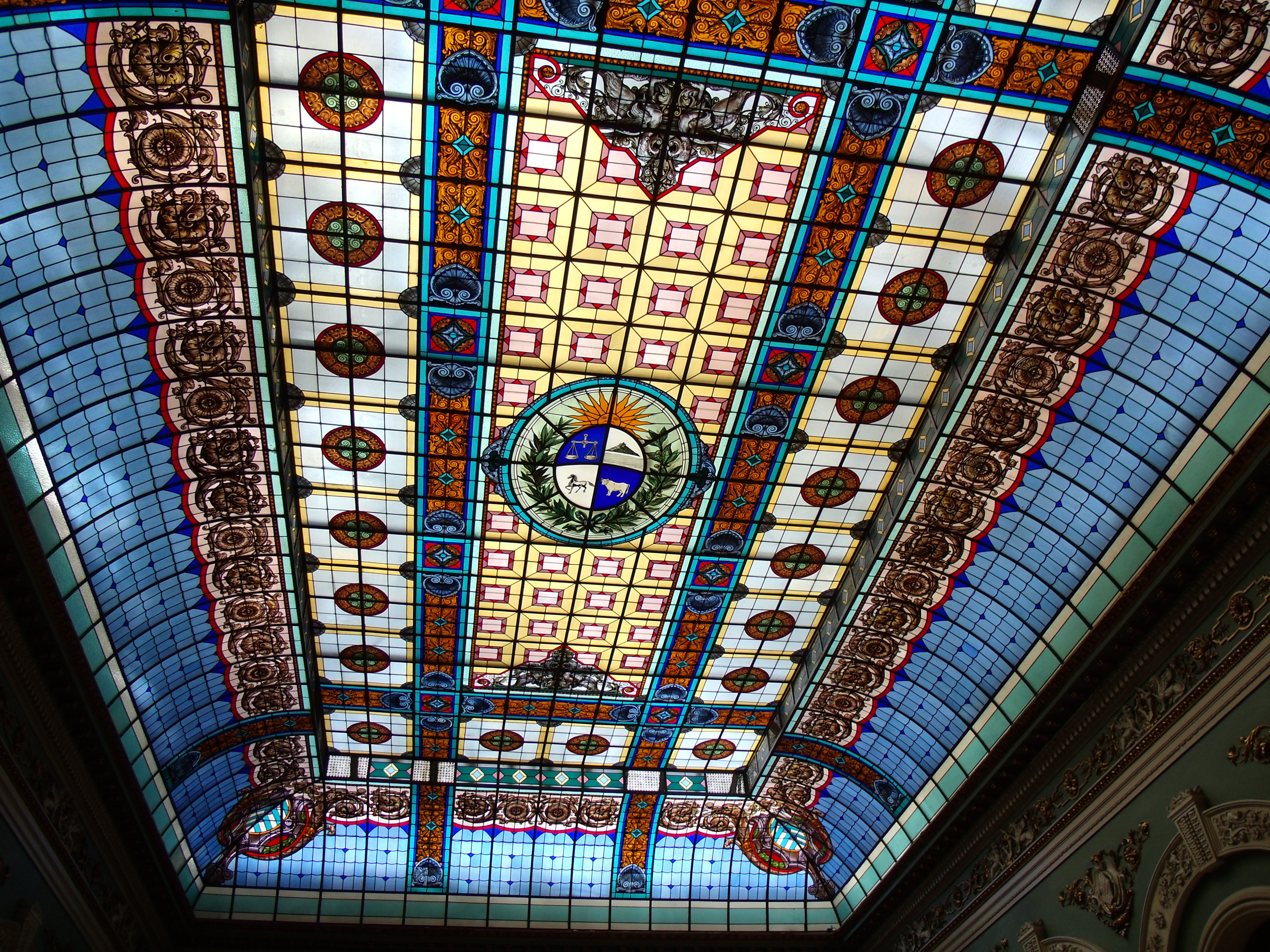
Skylight with the coat of arms of Uruguay

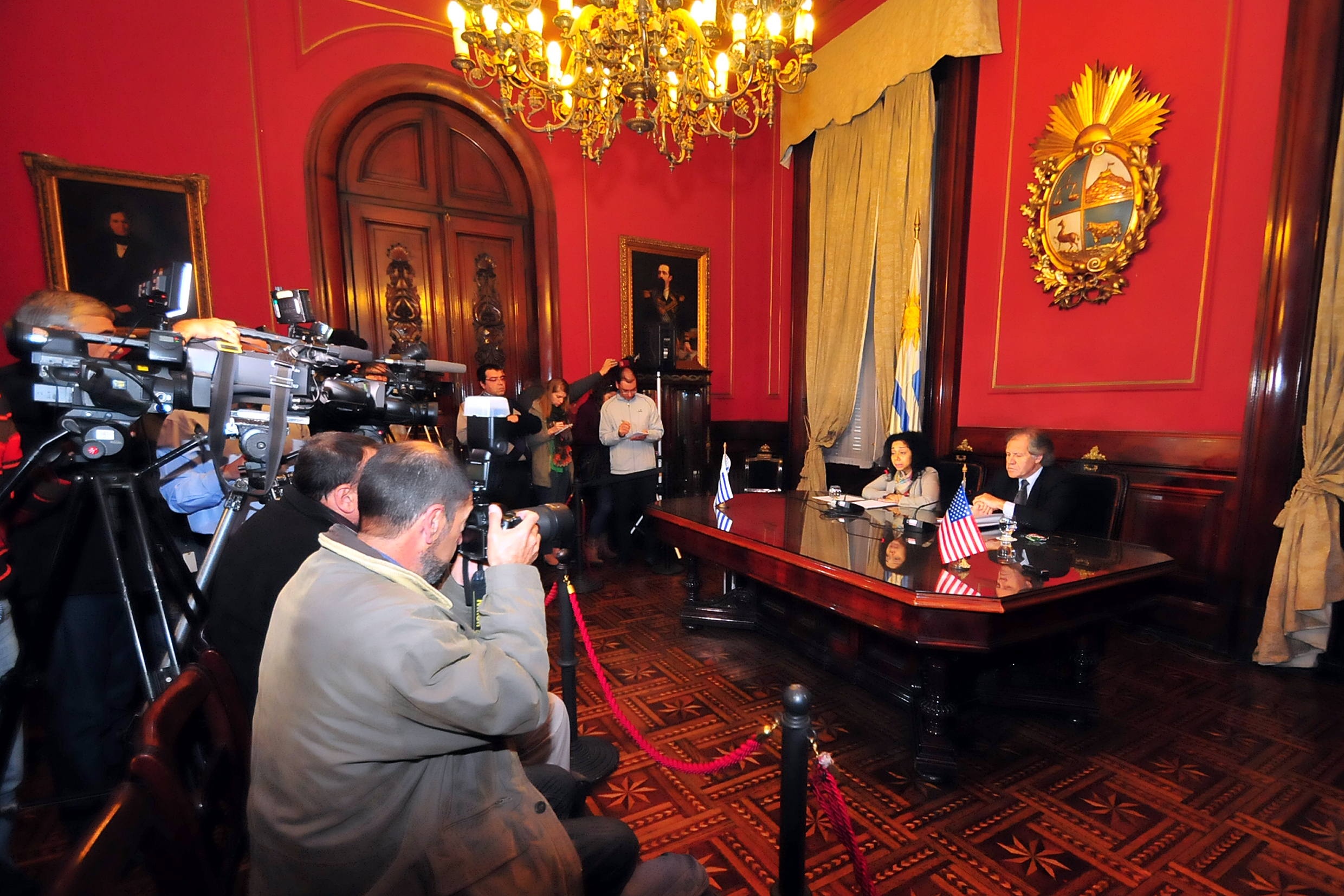
Press conference in the Red Room

The building's entrance hall is defined by eight Carrara marble columns and features a rectangular star design on the marble floor. The building follows the traditional layout of residences typical of its time, with its rooms and halls arranged around two large interior courtyards, both illuminated by skylights that allow natural light to filter through.

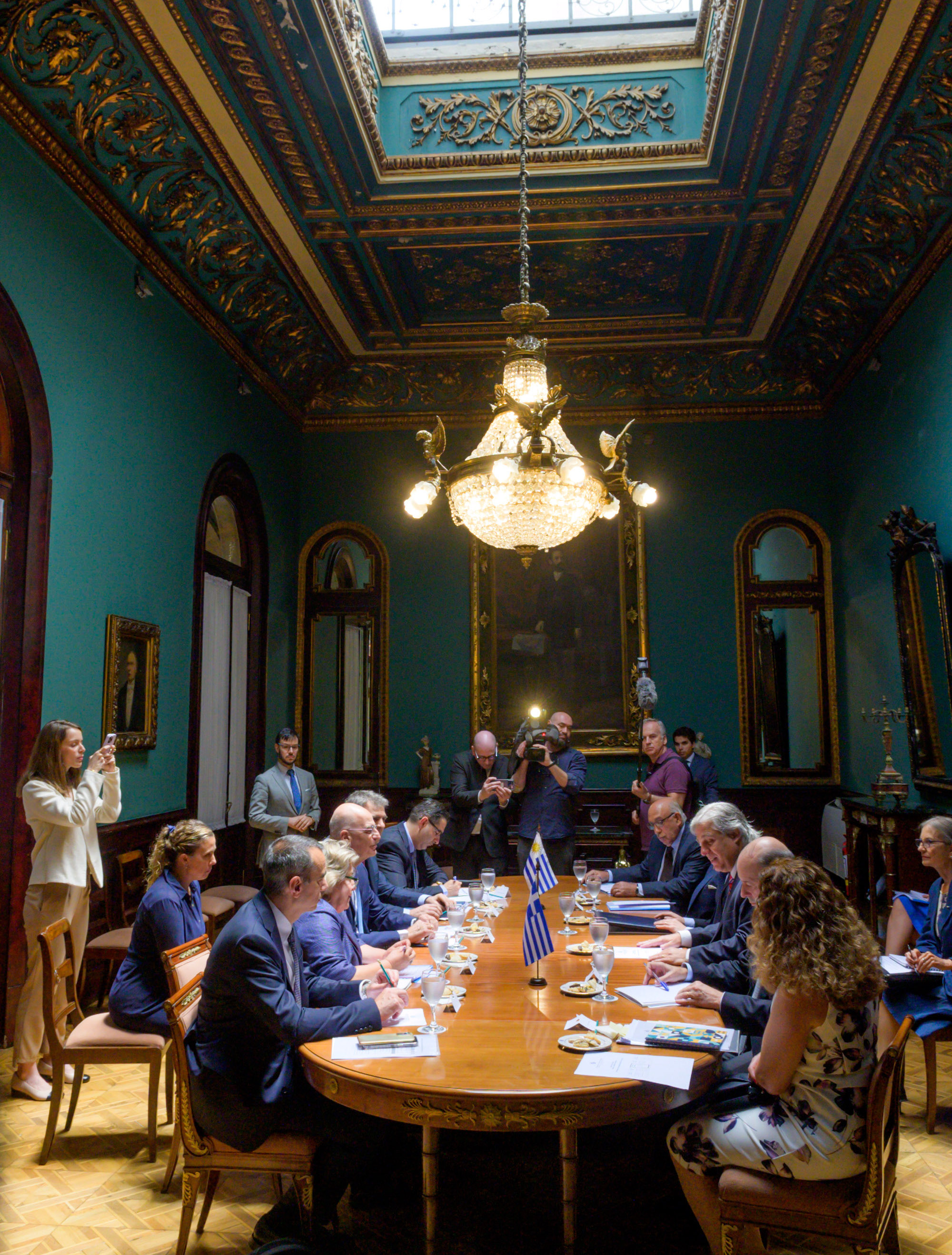
Chancellors’ Hall

The main courtyard, known as the Fountain Courtyard, features elaborate decoration on its walls and ceilings. At its center stands a single-piece marble fountain topped with a delicate Baroque sculpture of a child with a dolphin—a symbol of purity and abundance. In the 1930s, a stained-glass skylight depicting the coat of arms of Uruguay was added above the space. Meanwhile, the rear courtyard, referred to as the Colonial Courtyard, originally served as the entrance for carriages and possesses the only known specimen in Uruguay of pandanus tectorius. The Florentine Hall, which originally served as the summer dining room, connects both courtyards.

The Red Room, originally known as the "Left Hall," was used as the family's receiving room and features ornamented ceilings and chandeliers that illuminate the space. It is formally referred to as the "Ceremonial Hall" and is used for the signing of international treaties and for hosting press conferences. Located opposite this room and connected through the entrance hall is the space originally known as the "Right Hall", which once served as the office of Máximo Santos and currently houses the Protocol Director's office.

The Chancellors’ Hall, which originally served as the family's private museum, owes its name to the portraits of former foreign ministers displayed on its walls. (Note: In Uruguay, the term “Canciller” (Spanish for "Chancellor") is traditionally used to refer to the Minister of Foreign Affairs.) It is currently used for work meetings and negotiations with visiting foreign delegations. In turn, the residence's dining room, reserved for official lunches and dinners with high-ranking foreign authorities, features paintings by Uruguayan artists and a dome where musicians used to perform in the past.
