= Julio Herrera y Reissig =

Uruguayan poet, playwright and essayist (1875–1910)

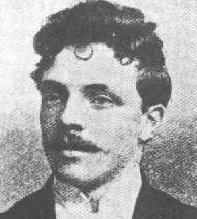
- Born: January 9, 1875; Montevideo, Uruguay
- Died: March 18, 1910 (aged 35); Montevideo, Uruguay
- Occupation: poet
- Writing career
- Movement: Modernism

Julio Herrera y Reissig (January 9, 1875 – March 18, 1910) was a Uruguayan poet, playwright and essayist, who began his career during the late Romanticist period and later became an early proponent of Modernism.

== Background ==
He was the son of Dr. Manuel Herrera y Obes and nephew of government minister Dr. Julio Herrera y Obes, who would go on to become president of Uruguay. Julio Herrera y Reissig was born in Montevideo into a wealthy patrician family with connections to the social and cultural scene.

== Health and travel ==
His only material limitation was his precarious health. In 1892, at age seventeen, a congenital heart defect, aggravated by typhoid fever, forced him to abandon his studies. Nor was he able to travel any great distance, and apart from a visit to Buenos Aires, he remained confined to Montevideo and the Uruguayan interior, including Castillo Piriá, near Piriápolis, where a plaque was unveiled in 1957 commemorating his residence there.

== Writings ==
He relieved his boredom by becoming an avid reader, and beginning in 1900, he began holding literary gatherings at his family mansion, in the penthouse nicknamed La Torre de los Panoramas for its spectacular views of the Río de la Plata.

There, he underwent a transformation from Romanticist to avant-garde Modernist and Surrealist, earning himself posthumous recognition as a major figure in the development of 20th-century Latin American poetry, alongside Leopoldo Lugones, Ricardo Jaimes Freyre, and Salvador Díaz Mirón.

== Death ==
He died in Montevideo at the age of 35, a few years before the publication of his works drew widespread praise from the literary community. The Uruguayan writer Ángel Rama marvelled at his achievement:

In just under ten years, despite wandering in the deafening and superficial bazaar of art nouveau, he created a poetry of subtle, modern sensibility, of impeccable linguistic precision.

== Works ==
Herrera y Reissig wrote fiction, political essays, and many other works, but his reputation rests on his poetry.

- Canto a Lamartine (1898)
- Epílogo wagneriano a "La política de fusión" con surtidos de psicología sobre el Imperio de Zapicán (1902)
- Las pascuas del tiempo (1902)
- Los maitines de la noche (1902)
- La vida (1903)
- Los parques abandonados (1902–1908)
- Los éxtasis de la montaña (1904–1907)
- Sonetos vascos (1908)
- Las clepsidras (1909)
- La torre de las esfinges (1909)
- Los peregrinos de piedra (1909)
- Tratado de la imbecilidad del país por el sistema de Herbert Spencer [Transcribed and published by Aldo Mazzucchelli] (2006)

== Bibliography ==
- Ibáñez, Suleika (1975). Herrera y Reissig, su vida y su obra (in Spanish). Montevideo: Salamandra.
- Mazzucchelli, Aldo (2010). La mejor de las fieras humanas. Vida de Julio Herrera y Reissig (in Spanish). Montevideo: Taurus.

== See also ==
- Piriápolis#Places of interest
