= Gonzalo Fernández (Uruguayan politician) =

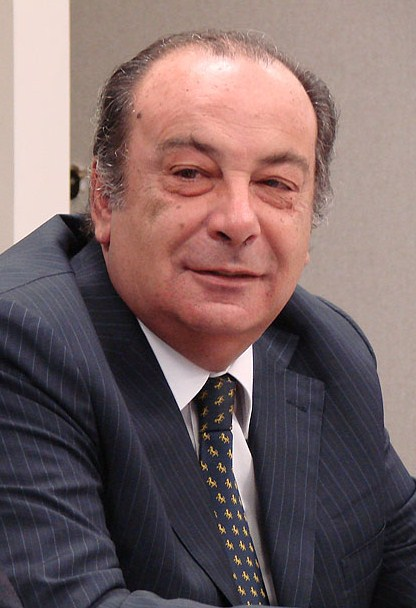
- Gonzalo Fernández un 2008.

Minister of Foreign Relations of Uruguay
- In office 3 March 2008 – 31 August 2009
- President: Tabaré Vázquez
- Preceded by: Reinaldo Gargano
- Succeeded by: Pedro Vaz

Personal details
- Born: Gonzalo Daniel Fernández Domínguez; 21 March 1952 (age 74) Montevideo, Uruguay
- Party: Broad Front
- Education: University of the Republic
- Occupation: politician, lawyer, diplomat

Gonzalo Daniel Fernández Domínguez (born 21 March 1952) is a Uruguayan lawyer, politician and former Foreign Minister of Uruguay, having been appointed in March 2008. Subsequently, he was Defense Minister until 1 March 2010.

== Background ==
Fernández was previously a senior aide to the President of Uruguay Tabaré Vázquez from 2005 to 2008.

His professional training was as a lawyer. Prior to working at the Secretariat of the Presidency, Fernández had worked as a lawyer for Vázquez when the latter was a practising medical doctor. A socialist, he was noted for his pragmatism and mastery of complex negotiations, and was seen as less ideological than his fellow-socialist predecessor as Foreign Minister, Reinaldo Gargano.

== Issues ==
A number of salient foreign affairs issues which Fernández inherited as Foreign Minister could be identified. These included:

=== Trade liberalization ===
Proposed moves for the liberalization of trade with the United States which he was thought to favour personally, but to which many of his left-wing party colleagues were viscerally opposed. A wider issue related to Uruguay's membership of, and hosting of the Secretariat of, Mercosur, the regional trade agreement. The challenge of Fernández was thus to pursue stable relations with Uruguay's regional trading partners with the goal of a climate favouring economic growth, while seeking not to disabuse openly the aspirations of the statist and protectionist Uruguayan Left, which supported the government in which he served.

=== Relations with Cuba and Venezuela ===
These were championed by his predecessor Reinaldo Gargano. Fernández's appointment came as Fidel Castro, long regarded as a mythical, cult figure by the Uruguayan Left, particularly after Castro's associate Che Guevara visited the Uruguayan city of Punta del Este, stepped down as President of Cuba. His appointment also coincided with the deterioration of relations between Venezuela and Colombia amidst threats of war, with Venezuela's sharp differences with the United States coming especially into focus. While Fernández's presumed less ideological approach to links with Venezuela and Cuba may not have been greatly significant at a personal level, it was thought that Fernández is likely to press hard for Uruguay to avoid becoming embroiled in anti-American political rhetoric. While in September 2008 Venezuela and Bolivia expelled their respective US Ambassadors, it was hard to envisage Uruguayan foreign policy under Fernández, though rhetorically very pro-Venezuela, taking such an anti-American line.

== See also ==
- Politics of Uruguay
