= Lorenzo Latorre =

Uruguayan officer and politician

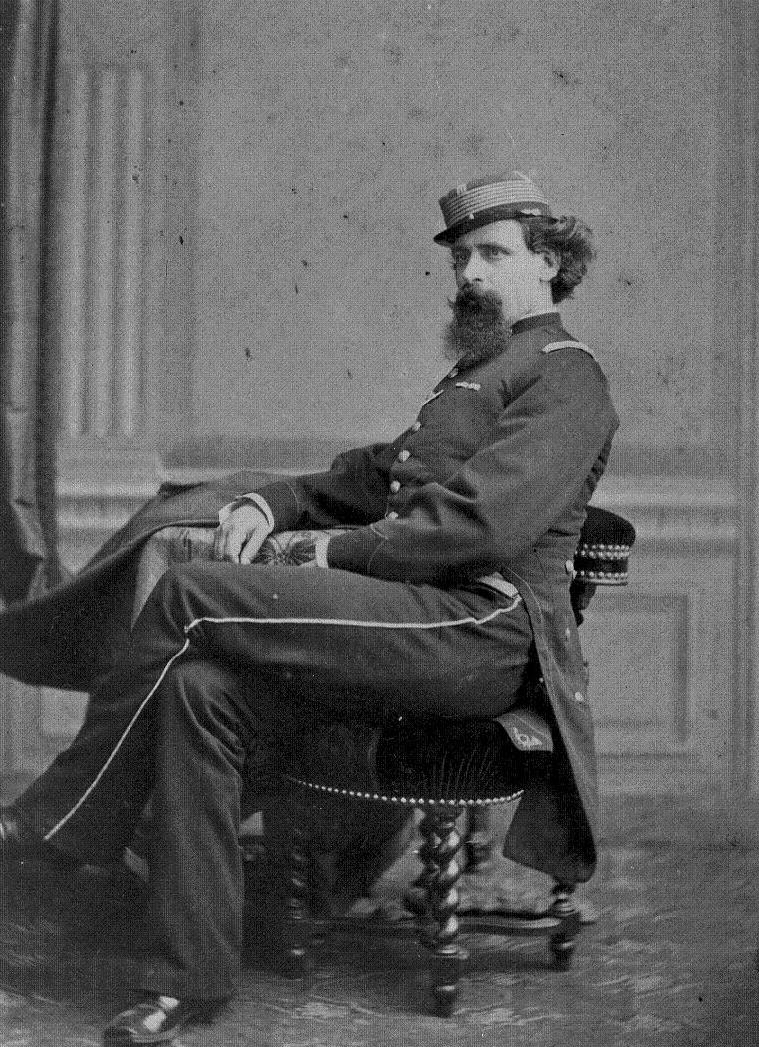
- Latorre, c. 1875

Provisional Governor of Uruguay
- In office 10 March 1876 – 1 March 1879
- Preceded by: Pedro Varela
- Succeeded by: Himself

President of Uruguay
- In office 1 March 1879 – 15 March 1880
- Preceded by: Himself
- Succeeded by: Francisco Antonino Vidal

Personal details
- Born: Lorenzo Antonio Inocencio Latorre Jampen; 8 July 1844 Montevideo, Uruguay
- Died: 18 January 1916 (aged 71) Buenos Aires, Argentina
- Party: Colorado Party
- Profession: Military, Politician

Lorenzo Latorre, full name Lorenzo Antonio Inocencio Latorre Jampen, (8 July 1844 – 18 January 1916) was a Uruguayan officer and politician, who was a dictator and President of Uruguay from 10 March 1876 until 15 March 1880. During his rule political opponents were oppressed, but at the same time, his reforms greatly improved the economy and state institutions.

== Early life ==
Latorre was son of an immigrant, born in Montevideo in 1844. He joined the army of Colorado Party during the civil war of 1863 and was promoted to ensign by 1865. On 2 May 1866 he was badly wounded at the Battle of Estero Bellaco during the Paraguayan War.

== Presidency ==
In January 1875, he was behind the coup which overthrew President José Eugenio Ellauri and started a period of military governments that lasted until 1890. In the government of Pedro Varela he was Minister of War and Navy. As a result of popular dissatisfaction with Valera's government, Latorre launched a new coup in March 1876 and assumed Presidency.

Latorre strengthened army against the constant threats of Blanco rebellions, by purchasing new weaponry from Remington and Mauser. He also abolished the rule that required colored people to serve in the army without choice. He saw this requirement as not only against the fundamental principles of equal rights but also against "the democratic principles to which we adhere."

With the help of British investments the railway and telegraph systems were expanded across the whole country.

During this time Uruguay became a large exporter of beef and merino wool, as sheep growing was encouraged and large pastures fenced in, to protect the herds. This also increased tax revenues, which others had found difficult to do, because of the logistics of taxing a rural population which moved around with its cattle. This semi-nomadic lifestyle was ended by enclosing and fencing pastures. European migrants were encouraged to move to countryside at the expense of traditional gauchos.

Latorre continued and expanded education reform which was started under José Pedro Varela. The 1877 "Law of Common Education" provided free, compulsory and non-religious co-education. His Minister of Education introduced reforms that would permanently improve literacy and allow women to join the leading professions. In 1870 literacy was 20%, but within forty years it had risen to 60% (This is particularly remarkable as the population tripled over this period).

Although he established a dictatorship, Latorre was initially popular because of the positive effect of his many reforms.

== Resignation and exile ==
On 1 March 1879, Latorre legitimized his presidency and was officially elected to the post of President. However, Latorre was accustomed to leading a military chain of command and he frequently clashed with others, who were more democratically inclined. Eventually he lost political and military support and on 13 March 1880 he resigned, announcing: "I am retiring to private life being discouraged to the point of believing that our country is an ungovernable country." Latorre then left for Argentina, where he spent the rest of his life. He died in 1916 in Buenos Aires. In 1975 Latorre's remains were returned to his country and buried in the National Cemetery.

== See also ==
- José Pedro Varela

== Bibliography ==
- Chagas, Jorge (2016). El sable roto. Montevideo: Fin de Siglo. p. 132. ISBN 9789974498310.

Political offices
Preceded by Pedro Varela	President of Uruguay; Provisional; 1876-1879	Succeeded by Francisco Antonino Vidal; Acting
Preceded by Francisco Antonino Vidal; Acting	President of Uruguay; 1879–1880	Succeeded by Francisco Antonino Vidal
