= List of ambassadors of Uruguay to Israel =

Coordinates: 32.160918°N 34.809800°E

Ambassador of Uruguay to Israel
- Incumbent; Manuel Etchevarren since May 23, 2023
- Inaugural holder: Juan Carlos Arizti
- Formation: May 27, 1998

The Uruguayan ambassador in Tel Aviv is the official representative of the Government in Montevideo to the Government of the Israel.

== List of representatives ==
Ambassador	Term start	Term end	Observations
Juan Carlos Arizti	1951	1954	Chargé d'affaires.
Pedro María Di Lorenzo	1956	1961	Minister
Víctor Mario Pomés	September 14, 1961	1968	
Augusto Heber Wild	1968		1968: Resolución por la que se le encomienda al actual Primer Secretario de la Embajada de la República en Israel, Señor Augusto Heber Wild, las funciones de Encargado de la Sección Consular de dicha Embajada. Resolución por la que pasa
Yamandú Laguarda Fernández	1969		(† July 12, 2011)
Alejandro Rovira	1976	1977	
Bautista Salvador Etcheverry Boggio	March 15, 1979	1984	
Yamandú Laguarda Fernández	1984	1985	NUEVO EMBAJADOR DE URUGUAY EN ISRAEL Montevideo (OJI) - Yamandú Laguarda fue designado por el gobierno uruguayo nuevo embajador en Israel. Con tal motivo lo recibió en su sede el Comité Central Israelita del Uruguay.
Juan Andrés Pacheco Ramírez	September 7, 1991	1993	(18 de agosto de 1939)
Anibal Díaz Mondino	September 13, 1990	1994	(† 1994: Falleció en España, donde atendía su quebrantada salud, don Aníbal Díaz Mondino, embajador del Uruguay en Israel.
Augusto Wild Aycaguer	1994	1996	Arturo Wild, NUEVO EMBAJADOR DEL URUGUAY EN ISRAEL Jerusalem (OJI) - Presentó sus cartas credenciales al presidente de Israel, Ezer Weizmann, el nuevo embajador del Uruguay, Dr. Augusto Wild, quien 25 años atrás desempeñó funciones
Alfredo José Platas	1996	1998	1991 fue embajador en Lisboa
José Luis Pombo Morales	May 27, 1998	2003	Nombramiento del Embajador José Luis Pombo como Decano del Cuerpo Diplomático en Israel.
Juan Carlos Ojeda Viglione	2003	2004	In 2011 he was ambassador in Theran.
Alfredo Eduardo Cazes Alvarez	2006		
Abram Bernardo Greiver del Hoyo	March 30, 2009	February 22, 2015	].
Néstor Alejandro Rosa Navarro	August 4, 2015		
Abram Bernardo Greiver del Hoyo	November 1, 2017	2022	
Manuel Etchevarren	May 23, 2023	present	
