= Reinaldo Gargano =

Uruguayan political figure (1934–2013)

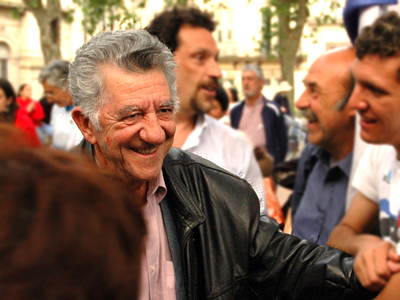

Senator
- In office March 11, 1985 – February 28, 2005

Minister of Foreign Relations
- In office March 1, 2005 – March 3, 2008

Senator
- In office March 3, 2008 – March 3, 2010

Personal details
- Born: July 26, 1934 Paysandú, Uruguay
- Died: February 5, 2013 (aged 78) Montevideo, Uruguay
- Party: Socialist Party
- Spouse: Judith Grauert
- Children: Two
- Occupation: Politician, journalist

Reinaldo Apolo Gargano Ostuni (July 26, 1934 – February 5, 2013) was a Uruguayan political figure.

== Exile ==
Born in Paysandú, Uruguay on July 26, 1934, Gargano went into exile in Spain in 1974 following a coup d'état. He returned to Uruguay several years later.

== Foreign Minister of Uruguay ==
He served as the Minister of Foreign Relations of Uruguay from March 2005 until March 2008, in the government of the President of Uruguay Tabaré Vázquez.

=== Relations with Cuba and Venezuela; trade issues ===
On 1 November 2004 Gargano said, "Our people will warmly welcome the reestablishment of diplomatic relations between Uruguay and Cuba."

As Foreign Affairs Minister in the first government of the Frente Amplio Gargano favored a stronger integration of Uruguay in the Mercosur, and opposed any free trade agreement with the US on ideological grounds. Gargano also promoted the close alignment of Uruguay with Venezuelan President Hugo Chávez and his anti-American "Movimiento Bolivariano" league of nations which include Venezuela, Cuba, Nicaragua, Bolivia and Ecuador.

=== Arms from Iran controversy ===
In 2007 a pressing issue arose for Gargano's Foreign Affairs Ministry, when the loading of Iranian arms onto a Uruguayan Navy vessel visiting Venezuela, in contravention of a UN-sponsored arms embargo provoked international comment.

=== Resignation ===
Gargano resigned from the Government of President Tabaré Vázquez in March 2008. He was succeeded as Foreign Minister by Gonzalo Fernández.

== Death ==
Gargano died on February 5, 2013, in Montevideo at the age of 79 after months of heart problems. He is buried at Parque del Recuerdo cemetery.

== See also ==
- Politics of Uruguay
- Tabaré Vázquez#Arms from Iran controversy
