= Miguel Alberto Flangini Ximénez =

President of Uruguay (1824–1900)

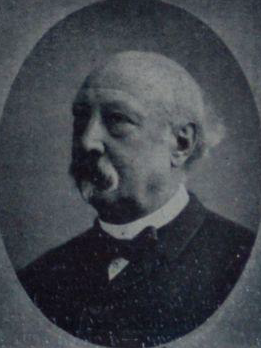

Interim President of Uruguay
- In office 28 February – 1 March 1882
- Preceded by: Francisco Antonino Vidal
- Succeeded by: Máximo Santos

Personal details
- Born: 1824
- Died: 1900 (aged 75–76)
- Party: Colorado Party

Miguel Alberto Flangini Ximénez (1824–1900) was a Uruguayan political figure.

== Background ==
Flangini was a member of the Colorado Party (Uruguay). This was during an era which was marked by considerable turmoil within the party.

== Interim President of Uruguay ==
He served briefly as President of Uruguay 28 February – 1 March 1882.

Flangini is seen as chiefly significant as a transitional figure between two Colorado Party (Uruguay) colleagues whose personal relations were sometimes fraught with difficulties: Francisco Antonino Vidal Silva, whom he succeeded as President, and Máximo Santos Barbosa, who in turn succeeded him.

== Death ==
He died in 1900.

== See also ==
- Colorado Party (Uruguay)#Earlier History
- Politics of Uruguay

Political offices
Preceded by Francisco Antonino Vidal	President of Uruguay; Acting; 1882	Succeeded by Máximo Santos
