= Óscar Secco Ellauri =

Uruguayan politician (1904–1990)

Óscar Secco Ellauri (6 August 1904 – 14 October 1990) was a Uruguayan politician, Education and Culture Minister from 1948 to 1951 during the government of Luis Batlle Berres and Foreign Affairs Minister from June 6, 1957, to February 28, 1959, during the administrations of Arturo Lezama (1957–1958) and Carlos Fischer (1958–1959). He was also deputy of the Representative Assembly of Montevideo, President of SODRE and Councilor of Secondary Education. Ellauri was a member of the United Nations Special Committee on Palestine (UNSCOP).

== Biography ==
He was the grandnephew of José Eugenio Ellauri y Obes, President of the Republic from 1873 to 1875 and great-grandson of José Longinos Ellauri Fernández, President of the Constituent Assembly of 1830 among other numerous political positions.

== See also ==
- List of political families#Uruguay
