= Alejandro Rovira =

Uruguayan politician and diplomat

Alejandro Luis Mariano Rovira de los Santos

Minister of the Interior of Uruguay
- In office 1972–1972
- President: Juan Maria Bordaberry
- Preceded by: Danilo Sena
- Succeeded by: Walter Ravenna

Uruguayan Ambassador to Israel of Uruguay to Israel
- In office 1975 – December 23, 1976
- President: Aparicio Méndez
- Preceded by: Yamandú Laguarda Fernández
- Succeeded by: Bautista Salvador Etcheverry Boggio

Minister of Foreign Relations of Uruguay
- In office December 23, 1976 – July 6, 1978
- Preceded by: Juan Carlos Blanco Estradé
- Succeeded by: Adolfo Folle Martínez

Personal details
- Born: April 30, 1917
- Died: 1991 (aged 73–74) Punta Ballena
- Spouse: Isabel de Rovira († 1976 in Jerusalem)
- Parents: José María Genaro Rovira Hernández (1882–1962), concejal departamental de Colonia por el Partido Colorado (father); Eva Isidora de los Santos (1881–1955) daughter of Emirene González Suárez (1863–1945) and Francisco Donato de los Santos Morales (1852–1911), Secretario de la Junta Departamental de Colonia, de filiación blanca. (mother)

Alejandro Luis Mariano Rovira de los Santos (1917 – 1991) was an Uruguayan politician and diplomat. He served as a Deputy Prosecutor of the Police, the Interventor of the Immigration Police, Deputy Undersecretary of the Interior, and as a Director of the National Civil Service Office.

== Career ==
From 1951 to 1967 he was "Director de la Oficina de Migraciones" (Immigration to Uruguay). In 1970 he was Representative for Montevideo, the Colorado Party (Uruguay) in the Chamber of Deputies of Uruguay. In 1972 he was President of the State Railways Administration of Uruguay and minister of the Interior of Uruguay. From 1975 to December 23, 1976 he was Ambassador in Jerusalem. From December 23, 1976 to July 6, 1978 he was foreign minister of Uruguay and represented the government of Aparicio Méndez at the United Nations General Assembly.

== Controversy and espionage during the Cold war ==
Mr. Rovira operated as an agent for the Czech intelligence agency (STB) under the codename "Veslar". Rovira was one of the 20 collaborators the agency had in Uruguay during the Coldwar and provided the agency with sensible material about the military, the police as well as facilitated visa arrangements for other collaborators while at the Ministry of the Interior. According to the files released by the Czech agency and discovered by researchers Vladimír Petrilák and Mauro Abranches Kraenski, Rovira was one of the most valuable contacts of the agency, as well as he was considered by agents as an "extreme right wing" character.

== Publications ==
- Subversion terrorism revolutionary war: the Uruguayan experience, Monte Video 1981, 29 pages.
