= Augusto Barcia Trelles =

Spanish politician (1881–1961)

The Most Excellent Augusto Barcia Trelles OIC
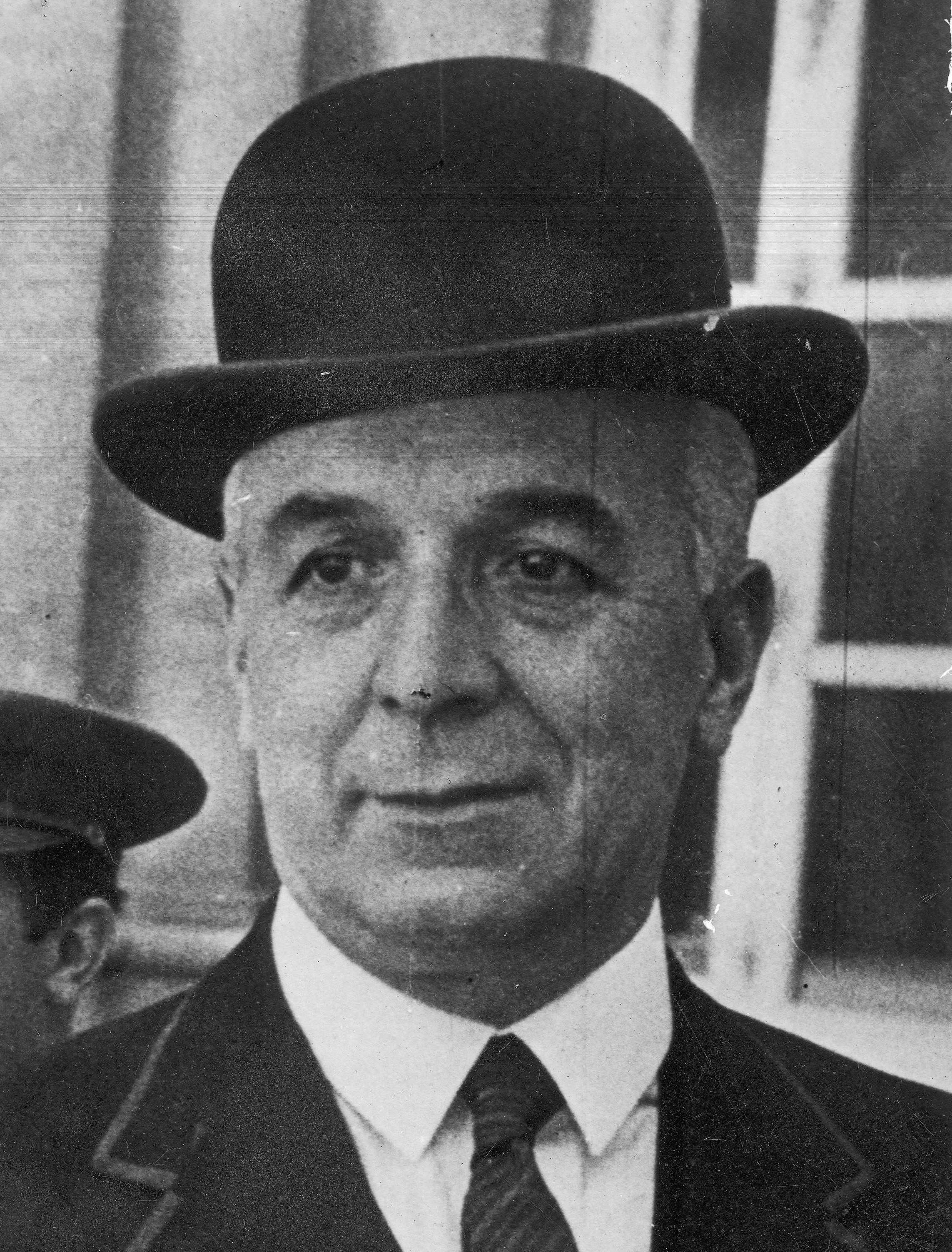

Prime Minister of Spain
- In office 10 May 1936 – 13 May 1936
- President: Manuel Azaña
- Preceded by: Manuel Azaña
- Succeeded by: Santiago Casares

Personal details
- Born: Augusto Barcia Trelles; 5 March 1881 Vegadeo, Asturias, Spain
- Died: 19 June 1961 (aged 80) Buenos Aires, Argentina

Augusto Barcia y Trelles (5 March 1881 – 19 June 1961) was a Spanish politician, several times member of the Congress of Deputies, who served as acting Prime Minister of Spain from 10 May 1936 to 13 May 1936 due to former PM Manuel Azaña being elected as President of the Republic. He was also a lawyer and a Freemason.

== Biography ==
=== Youth and formation ===
Born in Vegadeo, province of Oviedo, on March 5, 1881. Doctor in Law and lawyer, he was the brother of Camilo Barcia Trelles, professor of International Law, who had Adolfo Miaja de la Muela as a disciple.

From an early age he stood out in the journalistic field. Founder of the magazine La Joven España, he would collaborate with newspapers such as El Correo, El Liberal or La Libertad and also served as correspondent of several foreign newspapers in Spain. Barcia, of firm Europeanist convictions and favorable to the Allies in the course of the World War I, would publish during the conflict a good number of articles and chronicles in El Liberal, newspaper of which he would also become director in 1914.

=== Beginnings in politics ===
In his youth Barcia was a member of the circle of friends of the politician Segismundo Moret, a prominent member of the Liberal Party. Under the influence of Moret and Gumersindo de Azcárate, he ended up militating in the Reformist Party of Melquíades Álvarez. As a member of the Spanish Cortes he was firmly against the Antiterrorist Act pushed in 1908 by then-PM Antonio Maura.

For the elections of 1914 he presented his candidacy for deputy in Cortes for the Almería district of Vera; he did so presenting himself under the initials of the Reformist Party and with the clear support of some notables of this formation in Almería However, he was not elected deputy. In the elections of 1916 he would obtain a deputy seat for the district of Vera, and later he would revalidate the seat in the elections of 1918, 1919, 1920 and 1923.

During his time in the Cortes he would stand out especially for his interventions on foreign policy. After the establishment of the Dictatorship of Primo de Rivera he retired from active politics, devoting himself to his profession as a lawyer. The refusal of Melquíades Álvarez to criticize the dictatorship would lead Augusto Barcia to distance himself from his former political godfather.

=== Second Republic ===
In 1931, with the advent of the Second Republic, he returned to politics. In the elections to the Constituent Courts of that year he ran as a deputy for the Almería circumscription, but was not elected. Despite this failure, he played an important role at the national level during these years. In 1931 the government appointed him president of the Consejo Superior Bancario ("Higher Banking Council") and a year later he was appointed representative of Spain to the League of Nations in Geneva.

After a period of approximation, in 1933 he joined Republican Action (AR), the party of Manuel Azaña. Thanks to Barcia's influence, the Diario de Almería became the provincial organ of the Republican Action party.

With a view to the November 1933 elections, he forged an alliance between Republican Action and Lerroux's Radical Party in the province of Almería, managing to obtain a seat. Barcia was one of the few deputies that Republican Action obtained, which suffered a general defeat in the elections. Faced with this situation, AR would join with the Galician Republicans and the independent radical-socialists to form a new party, Republican Left (IR), a formation in which Augusto Barcia would also join. Within the Almeria provincial organization of IR he became its main leader.

He would defend Lluís Companys and other members of the Generalitat of Catalonia for their participation in the proclamation of the Catalan State in October 1934.

In the elections of February 1936 he was part of the Popular Front candidates for Almería, being the most voted candidate -with 68,175 votes- and managing to revalidate his deputy's seat. After the victory obtained by the Popular Front coalition, on February 19 he was appointed Minister of State in the cabinet presided over by Manuel Azaña. Between May 11 and 13 he would assume the post of President of the Council of Ministers, after the resignation of Azaña -who had been elected President of the Republic-. He would be succeeded at the head of the government by Santiago Casares Quiroga, maintaining, however, the post of Minister of State.

After the Civil War, in July 1936, he assumed the post of Minister of the Interior in the very brief government headed by Diego Martínez Barrio. He would again hold the portfolio of State in the cabinet presided over by José Giral, leaving in September 1936. He was appointed Spanish ambassador to Uruguay, although he would not assume the post due to the rupture of relations between the two countries. Although he remained in the background, he attended the meetings that the Republican Cortes held in October 1937 and August 1938. As the war progressed, he would serve as advisor to the Spanish Embassy in Paris and as Spanish ambassador to the Soviet Union.

=== Exile and last years ===
Seeing the war irretrievably lost, in 1939 he left Europe and moved to Latin America, settling in Buenos Aires.

His departure into exile was followed by repression on the part of Franco's dictatorship. The Special Tribunal for the Repression of Freemasonry and Communism sentenced him to thirty years imprisonment and absolute disqualification from practicing his profession, while the National Tribunal for Political Responsibilities imposed a fine of twenty-five million pesetas and the confiscation of all his assets. It was even proposed that he should lose his Spanish nationality.

Since 1941 he was president of the Patronato Hispano-Argentino de Cultura, developing a feverish activity as a writer and lecturer.21 In parallel, he would also collaborate actively with the Republican institutions in exile: he was part of the central board of Acción Republicana Española, at the same time he served as delegate in Argentina of the Junta Española de Liberación. After the Second World War, he attended in Mexico City the meeting of the Republican Courts in exile. In August 1945 he became Minister of Finance of the government-in-exile presided over by José Giral, a position he would hold until August 1947.

He died in Buenos Aires on June 19, 1961.

== Private life ==
Throughout his life he was the author of several works of a juridical-political and historical nature. In addition to Spanish, he was also fluent in Italian, French, English and German.

He was a member of the Ateneo de Madrid from 1908, an institution in which he was very active and held positions of responsibility, such as general secretary and president (a position he held between December 1932 and June 1933). Between 1925 and 1926 he was president of the Royal Spanish Athletics Federation. He was also a member of the Madrid Press Association (from 1916) and of the Association of Friends of the Soviet Union, the latter of which was formed in 1933.

== Masonic activity ==
Augusto Barcia was a distinguished Mason. Having been initiated in the Madrilenian lodge Ibérica in 1910, he developed an important work in the Masonic institution to the point that he was elected Grand Master of the Gran Oriente Español in 1921. After the death of Enrique Gras Morillo, on December 9, 1928. he was elected Sovereign Grand Commendator of the Supreme Council of the 33rd Degree for Spain of the Ancient and Accepted Scottish Rite, a position he held until 1933, year in which he resigned because he understood that Freemasonry should be separated from any political activity, arguing his resignation as follows:

"I'm returning to the active life of politics and I'm going to join a party. My significance in the Order, my history in the high position that you've honored me with and that for so many years I carried out, force me to resign it with irrevocable character. I want, above all, to be consequent with my conduct and my ideas, keeping at all times separated from the Institution any partisan influence, any suspicion of political interference".

== Bibliography ==
- Álvarez Rey, Leandro (2009). "Los Diputados por Andalucía de la Segunda República 1931-1939". Barcia Trelles, Augusto. Fundación Centro de Estudios Andaluces. pp. 374–389. ISBN 978-84-613-1326-6.
- Cabeza Sánchez-Albornoz, Sonsoles (2014). Historia política de la Segunda República en el exilio. Fundación Universitaria Española.
- Checa Godoy, Antonio (1989). Prensa y partidos políticos durante la II República. Universidad de Salamanca. ISBN 9788474815214.
- Heine, Hartmut (1983). La oposición política al franquismo. De 1939 a 1952. Barcelona: Crítica. ISBN 84-7423-198-1.
- Iglesias, Juan José (2012), La violencia en la Historia. Análisis del pasado y la perspectiva sobre el mundo actual, Universidad de Huelva Publicaciones, ISBN 978-84-16621-49-1
- López Castillo, Antonio (2014), "Miradas al pasado reciente: de la II República a la Transición", Trayectoria política de Augusto Barcia Trelles, En: Mónica Fernández Amador y Rafael Quirosa-Cheyrouze (Eds.), Almería: Editorial Universidad de Almería, ISBN 978-84-16027-73-6
- Reig García, Ramón (2011). La comunicación en Andalucía: Historia, estructura y nuevas tecnologías. Sevilla: Centro de Estudios Andaluces. ISBN 978-84-939078-0-8.
- Romero Salvadó, Francisco J. (2013). Historical Dictionary of the Spanish Civil War. Scarecrow Press. ISBN 978-0-8108-8009-2.
- Sánchez Casado, Galo (2009). Los altos grados de la masonería. Madrid: Ediciones Akal. pp. 342–370. ISBN 978-84-96797-20-8.
- Tusell, Xavier (1977). La oposición democrática al franquismo (1939-1962). Barcelona: Planeta. ISBN 84-320-7525-6.
- Urquijo y Goitia, José Ramón de (2008). Gobiernos y ministros españoles en la edad contemporánea (2ª ed.). Madrid: CSIC. ISBN 978-84-00-08737-1.
- Varela Ortega, José (2001). El poder de la influencia: geografía del caciquismo en España (1875-1923). Marcial Pons Historia.

| Preceded by Manuel Azaña | Prime Minister of Spain; 1936 | Succeeded by Santiago Casares Quiroga |
