= Eduardo Rodríguez Larreta =

Eduardo Rodríguez Larreta (11 December 1888 – 15 August 1973) was a Uruguayan journalist who served as his country's foreign minister in the 1940s.

== Noted achievements ==
Rodríguez formulated what is sometimes called the "Larreta Doctrine", whereby the nations of the Americas could "consider multilateral action against any member state violating elementary human rights". Rodríguez Larreta argued that there a "parallelism" between democratic practice and respect for human rights in domestic politics and the maintenance of peace in the Americas. The proposal was advanced in a series of diplomatic notes in late 1945 and early 1946 for possible inclusion in the agendas of upcoming postwar inter-American conferences, including the Rio Conference that produced the Inter-American Treaty of Reciprocal Assistance. The proposal drew on Latin American traditions of popular sovereignty and international jurisprudence. Long and Friedman describe the Larreta doctrine as, "a tripartite precommitment mechanism to create a web of national commitments to democratic governance and the domestic protection of human rights, to establish a regional insurance policy against failures to maintain those commitments, and to obligate the great power and neighboring states to precommit to working through the regional system instead of unilaterally." The "doctrine" was controversial, with Argentine Foreign Minister Juan Isaac Cooke and others, criticizing it as going against non-interventionism. The proposal was also opposed by Brazil and Mexico, though it garnered support from the United States, Guatemala, and Cuba.

=== Foreign Minister of Uruguay ===
He served as Foreign Minister of Uruguay from 1945 until 1947, in the government of President Juan José de Amézaga.

=== Founding Co-editor of El País ===
Rodriguez Larreta was also a founding editor of Uruguayan daily El País and received the Maria Moors Cabot prize in 1949.

== See also ==
- List of ministers of foreign relations of Uruguay
