= Bautista Salvador Etcheverry Boggio =

Uruguayan Ambassador to Israel
- In office March 15, 1979 – 1984
- Preceded by: Víctor Mario Pomés
- Succeeded by: Alejandro Rovira

Personal details
- Born: December 2, 1931
- Died: April 18, 2015 (aged 83) Montevideo
- Spouse: Elsa Teresita Canessa Falco
- Children: Ana Teresita Etcheverry Canesa

Bautista Salvador Etcheverry Boggio (December 2, 1931 – April 18, 2015) was a Uruguayan Ambassador.

- He was a member of the Board of Directors of the Federación de Asociaciones Educativas Privadas de América Latina y el Caribe and Regional Director for Uruguay.

== Career ==
- He was employed as teacher and Inspector of one of the Departments of Uruguay.
- In the end of 1960 he became Deputy Inspector of the Presidency of the Consejo Nacional de Enseñanza Primaria y Normal of Uruguay
- In 1973 he was employed as Director General de Educación Primaria.
- In 1977 he became Deputy Representative of Uruguay to the Organization of American States.
- From March 15, 1979 to 1984 he was the Uruguayan Ambassador in Israel.
- After the Jerusalem Law passed by the Knesset on July 30, 1980 and was enacted by Yitzhak Navon the Uruguayan Embassy was moved from Jerusalem to Tel Aviv.

== Publication ==
- Instituciones de atención de menores y de reeducación de jóvenes y adultos, en México, Estados Unidos de Norte América y Puerto Rico.
