= Manuel Herrera y Obes =

Uruguayan politician and diplomat

Manuel Herrera y Obes

Manuel Herrera y Obes (1806–1890) was an Uruguayan politician and diplomat, and one of the main leaders of the government of Montevideo ("La Defensa") during the Uruguayan Civil War ("La Guerra Grande"). He was Minister of Finance from 1852 to 1853.
