= Parque del Reencuentro =

Cemetery in Canelones Department, Uruguay

Coordinates: 34°44′19″S 56°15′11″W

- Interactive map of Parque del Reencuentro

Details
- Established: 1993
- Location: Canelones Department
- Country: Uruguay
- Owned by: Los Parques del Uruguay

Parque del Reencuentro is a private cemetery in Uruguay.

It is located at Canelones Department, 21 km north of downtown Montevideo, on the Ruta 5, near Las Piedras.

== History ==
The cemetery was established in 1993; it is operated by the same company as Parque del Recuerdo.
