= Máximo Tajes =

Uruguayan politician (1852–1912)

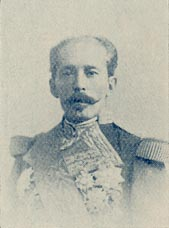

15th President of Uruguay
- In office November 18, 1886 – March 1, 1890
- Preceded by: Máximo Santos
- Succeeded by: Julio Herrera y Obes

Personal details
- Born: November 23, 1852 Canelones, Uruguay
- Died: November 21, 1912 (aged 59) Montevideo, Uruguay
- Party: Colorado Party
- Profession: Military

Máximo Tajes Caceres (November 23, 1852 – November 21, 1912) was a Uruguayan political figure.

== Background ==
Tajes came from a military background. He was a member of the Colorado Party (Uruguay), which ruled the country almost uninterruptedly for a century. He served as Minister of War from 1882 to 1886 under President Máximo Santos.

In November 1886, President Santos, with whom he had poor relations, stepped down from his second term of office.

== President of Uruguay ==
Tajes served as President of Uruguay from 1886 to 1890. During his time as president, the Public Charity and Beneficence Commission was established by Law in 1889, which depended on the Ministry of Government. The task of this commission was to administer charity hospitals.

He was succeeded as president by his Colorado Party (Uruguay) colleague Julio Herrera y Obes.

== Death and legacy ==
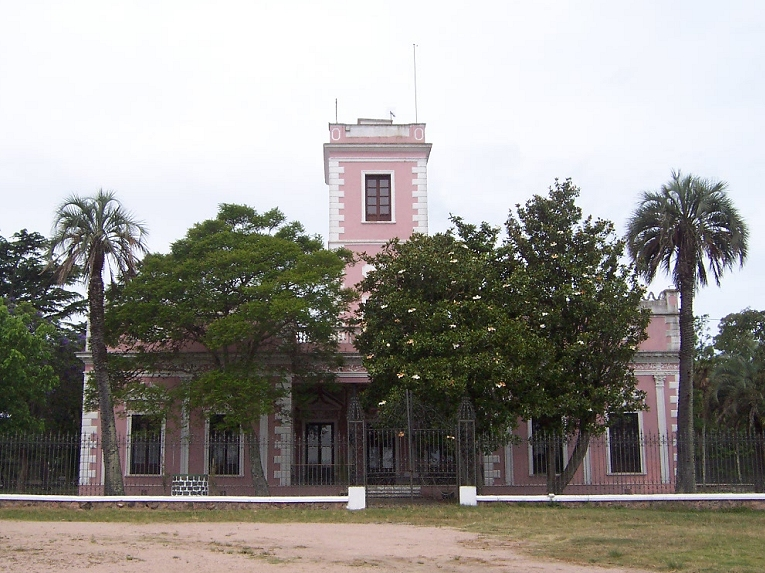
The residence of Máximo Tajes, now a house museum.

Máximo Tajes died at age 59 in November 1912. His residence, near Cerrillos and close to the banks of the Santa Lucia river, is situated on a location called Parrador Tajes. It has become a house museum which is open to the public free of charge.

A road in Carrasco, Montevideo, is named after Máximo Tajes.

== Political views ==
Tajes was a supporter of liberal ideas.

== See also ==
- Colorado Party (Uruguay)#Earlier History
- Politics of Uruguay

Political offices
| Preceded by Máximo Santos | President of Uruguay; 1886-1890 | Succeeded by Julio Herrera y Obes |
