= Máximo Santos =

President of Uruguay

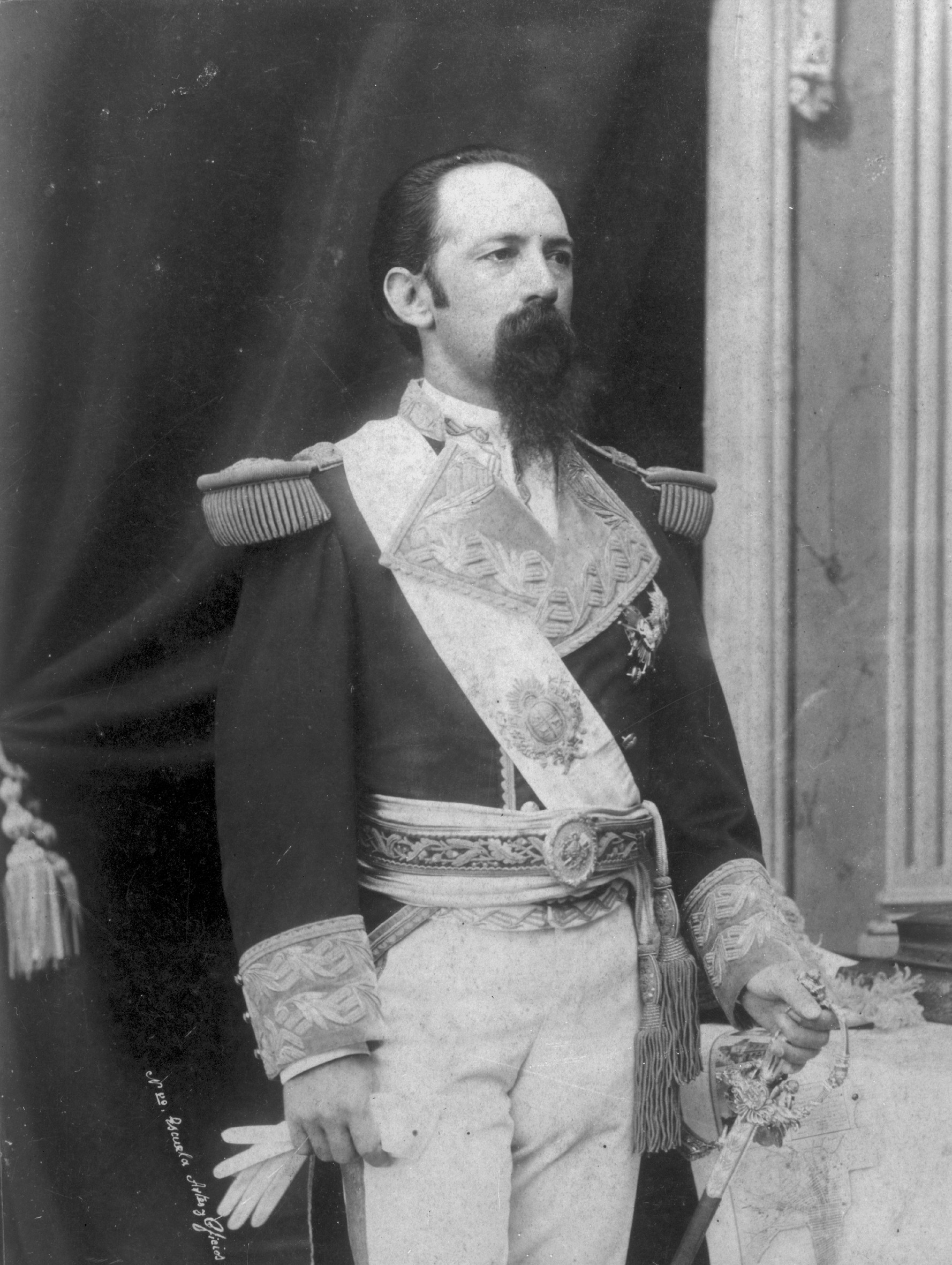

President of Uruguay
- In office 1 March 1882 – 1 March 1886
- Preceded by: Francisco Antonino Vidal
- Succeeded by: Francisco Antonino Vidal
- In office 24 May 1886 – 18 November 1886
- Preceded by: Francisco Antonino Vidal
- Succeeded by: Máximo Tajes

Personal details
- Born: 15 April 1847 Pando, Uruguay
- Died: 19 May 1889 (aged 42) Buenos Aires, Argentina
- Party: Colorado Party

Máximo Benito Santos Barbosa (15 April 1847 – 19 May 1889) was a Uruguayan political and military figure who was President of Uruguay from 1882 to 1886. He was member of the Colorado Party.

He governed as an authoritarian in an alliance with the military.

== Background ==
Santos pursued a career in the military, prior to serving as Minister for War from 1880 to 1882. He was a member of the Colorado Party (Uruguay).

In 1882 Miguel Alberto Flangini Ximénez, who served briefly as acting President of Uruguay, stepped down from office.

== President of Uruguay (1st term) ==
Succeeding acting President Flangini, Santos served as President of Uruguay from 1882 until 1886.

=== Creation of Flores Department ===
Among Santos's lasting acts as President was the creation of the Flores Department in the interior of the country, named after assassinated former President of Uruguay General Venancio Flores, who hailed from the territory incorporated as a department.

=== Other features of his rule ===
He also in a measure repaired relations with Paraguay.

However, his administration was also widely criticized for failure to root out corruption.

He also advocated for social reforms.

During his presidency, a decree of November 28, 1882 provided that public lands, occupied by tenants, may be used for the formation of agricultural colonies.

=== Succession ===
Santos was succeeded as president by Francisco Antonino Vidal in 1886. Santos served as the President of the Senate of Uruguay in 1886.

== President of Uruguay (second interim term) ==
Subsequently, after relinquishing presidential office in 1886, Santos returned to exercise presidential powers for a number of months in 1886.

In August 1886, there was an assassination attempt on Santos.

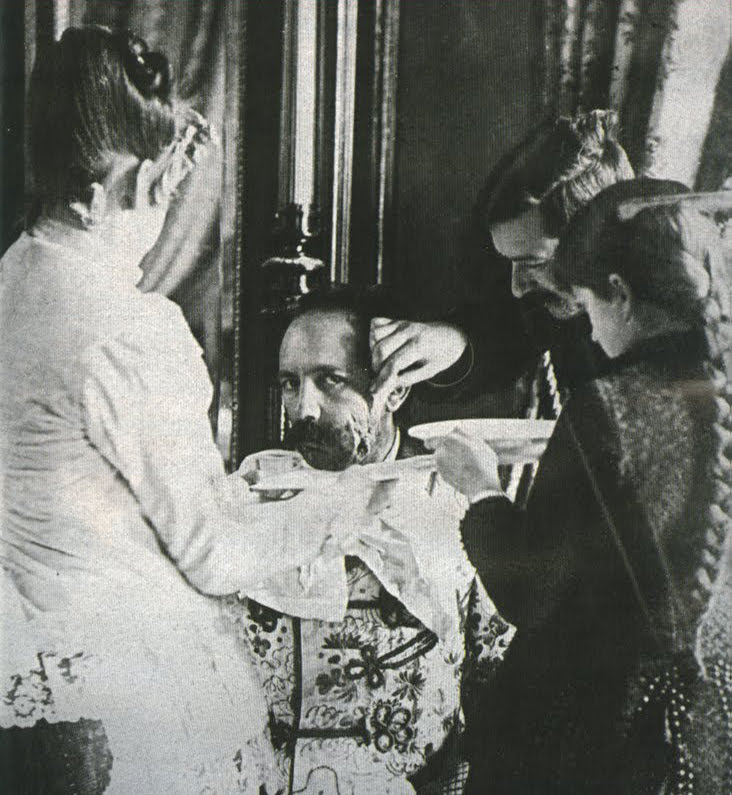
Santos after the 1886 assassination attempt

=== Succession ===
Santos was succeeded as president by his Colorado Party colleague Máximo Tajes, with whom, however, he had poor relations. Tajes was still exercising his presidential office at Santos's death.

== Later life and death ==
Subsequent to the relinquishing of his presidential office for the second time, Santos travelled in Europe, and was unable to return to Uruguay.

Still aged in his early 40s, Santos died in exile in Buenos Aires, Argentina, in 1889.

== Legacy ==
Santos' magnificent residence in downtown Montevideo nowadays is the seat of the Ministry of Foreign Relations of Uruguay and is known as Palacio Santos. His country estate now houses the Museo de la Memoria, a state-owned museum dedicated to the victims of the Uruguayan dictatorship.

== See also ==
- Colorado Party (Uruguay)#Earlier History
- Politics of Uruguay
- Miguel Alberto Flangini Ximénez#Interim President of Uruguay
- Máximo Tajes#President of Uruguay
- Flores Department#History and cultural heritage
