= Ministry of Foreign Relations (Uruguay) =

Government ministry of Uruguay

- Ministerio de Relaciones Exteriores

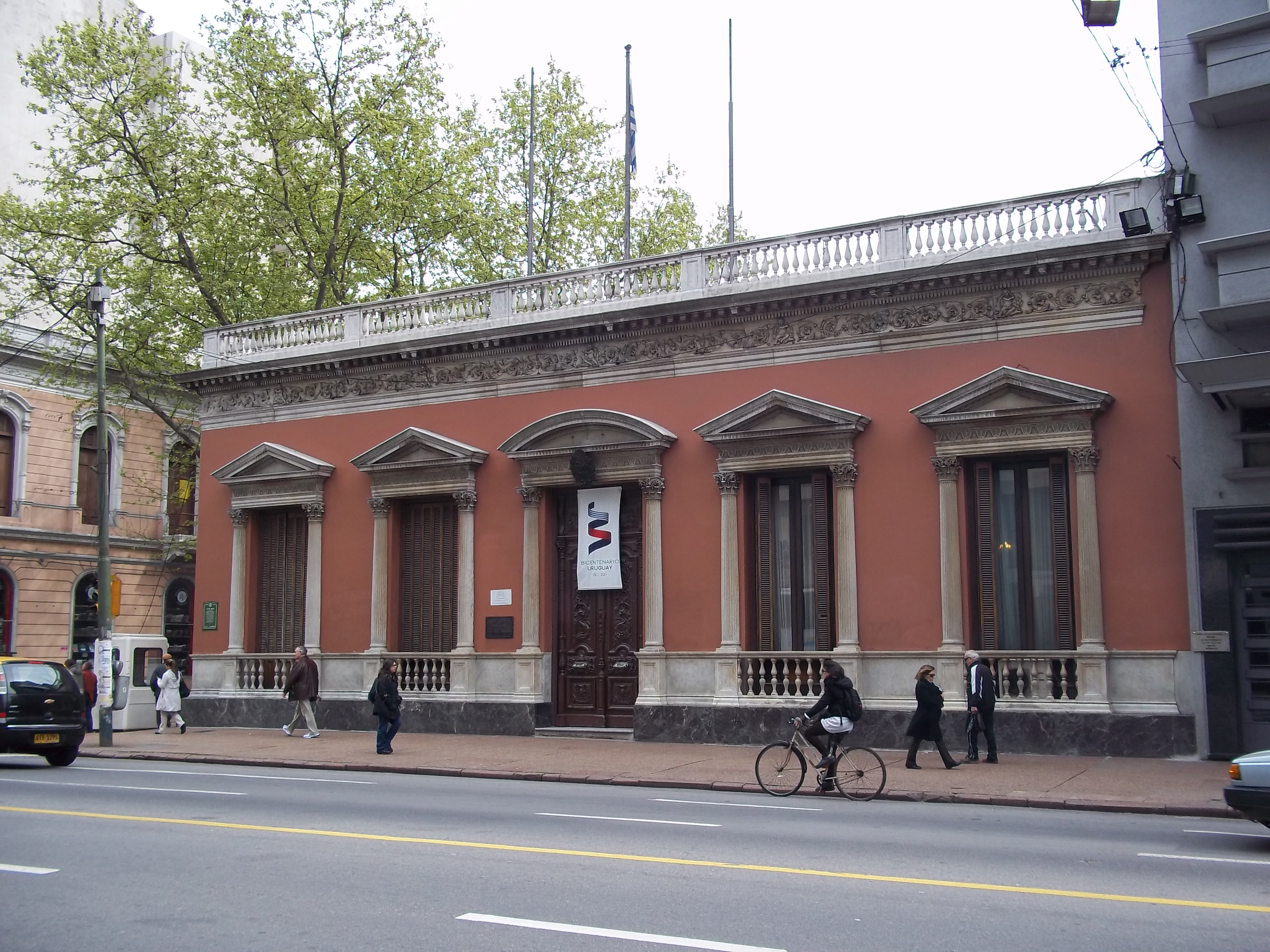
- Santos Palace, headquarters of the Ministry.

Ministry overview
- Formed: 22 December 1828
- Jurisdiction: Government of Uruguay
- Headquarters: Montevideo
- Minister responsible: Mario Lubetkin
- Website: Foreign Relations

The Ministry of Foreign Relations (Spanish: Ministerio de Relaciones Exteriores, MRREE) is Uruguay's government ministry responsible for planning, directing, and implementing the country's foreign policy and international relations. It oversees Uruguayan embassies, consular representatives, permanent missions to international organizations, and other state services abroad.

Commonly referred to as Cancillería (Spanish for 'Chancellery'), it is headquartered in the historic Santos Palace, located in Central Montevideo. The current foreign minister is Mario Lubetkin, who has served since March 1, 2025 in the cabinet of Yamandú Orsi.

== Headquarters ==
It is commonly referred to in Uruguayan media and diplomatic jargon as the Palacio Santos, after the historical building which since 1955 has housed the ministry (originally the residence of President Máximo Santos in the late 19th century). It is located in the Centro neighbourhood of Montevideo.

This building is one of the major historic structures in the Uruguayan capital, and has been the subject of prominent documentary publicity.

== See also ==
- Foreign relations of Uruguay
- List of diplomatic missions in Uruguay
- List of diplomatic missions of Uruguay
- List of ministers of foreign relations of Uruguay
- Mercosur
- Visa requirements for Uruguayan citizens

== Bibliography ==
- Cancilleres del Uruguay: reseña biográfica de los ministros de relaciones exteriores de la República Oriental del Uruguay, 1828-2002 (Gerardo Caetano, Gabriel Bucheli, Jaime Yaffé e Instituto Artigas del Servicio Exterior. Ed. Ministerio de Relaciones Exteriores, Instituto Artigas del Servicio Exterior, 2002)
