= Parque del Recuerdo (Uruguay) =

Cemetery in Uruguay

Coordinates: 34°48′36″S 55°58′03″W

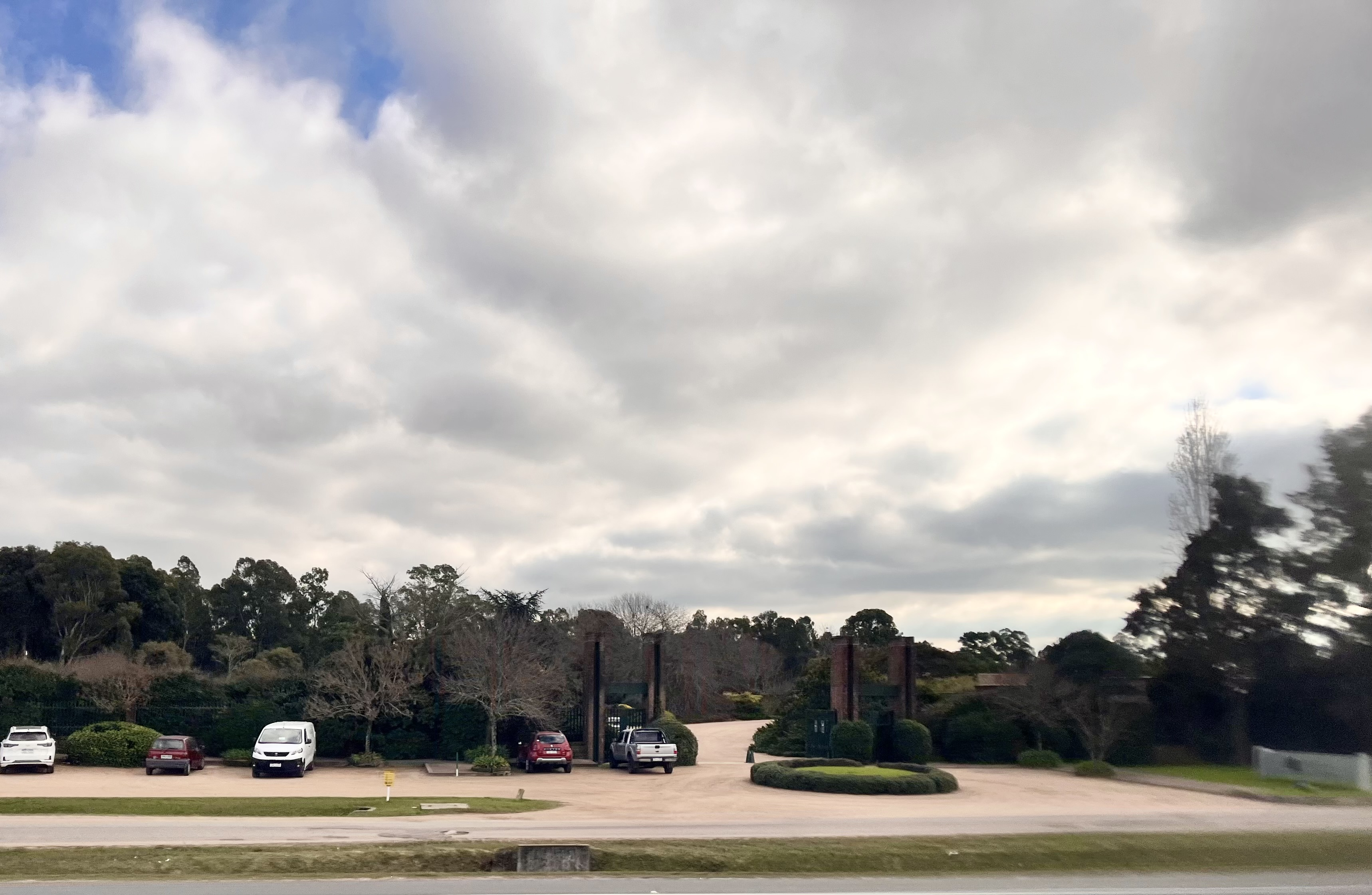
- Interactive map of Parque del Recuerdo

Details
- Established: 1993
- Location: Canelones Department
- Country: Uruguay
- Type: private
- Owned by: Los Parques del Uruguay
- Find a Grave: Parque del Recuerdo

Parque del Recuerdo is a private cemetery in Uruguay.

It is located at Canelones Department, 25 km east of downtown Montevideo, on the Ruta Interbalnearia, north of Ciudad de la Costa.

== History ==
The cemetery was established in 1993.

== Notable burials ==
- Reinaldo Gargano (1934–2013) – Foreign Minister and Senator
- Ladislao Mazurkiewicz (1945–2013) – Association football goalkeeper and coach
