= José Longinos Ellauri =

Uruguayan politician (1789–1867)

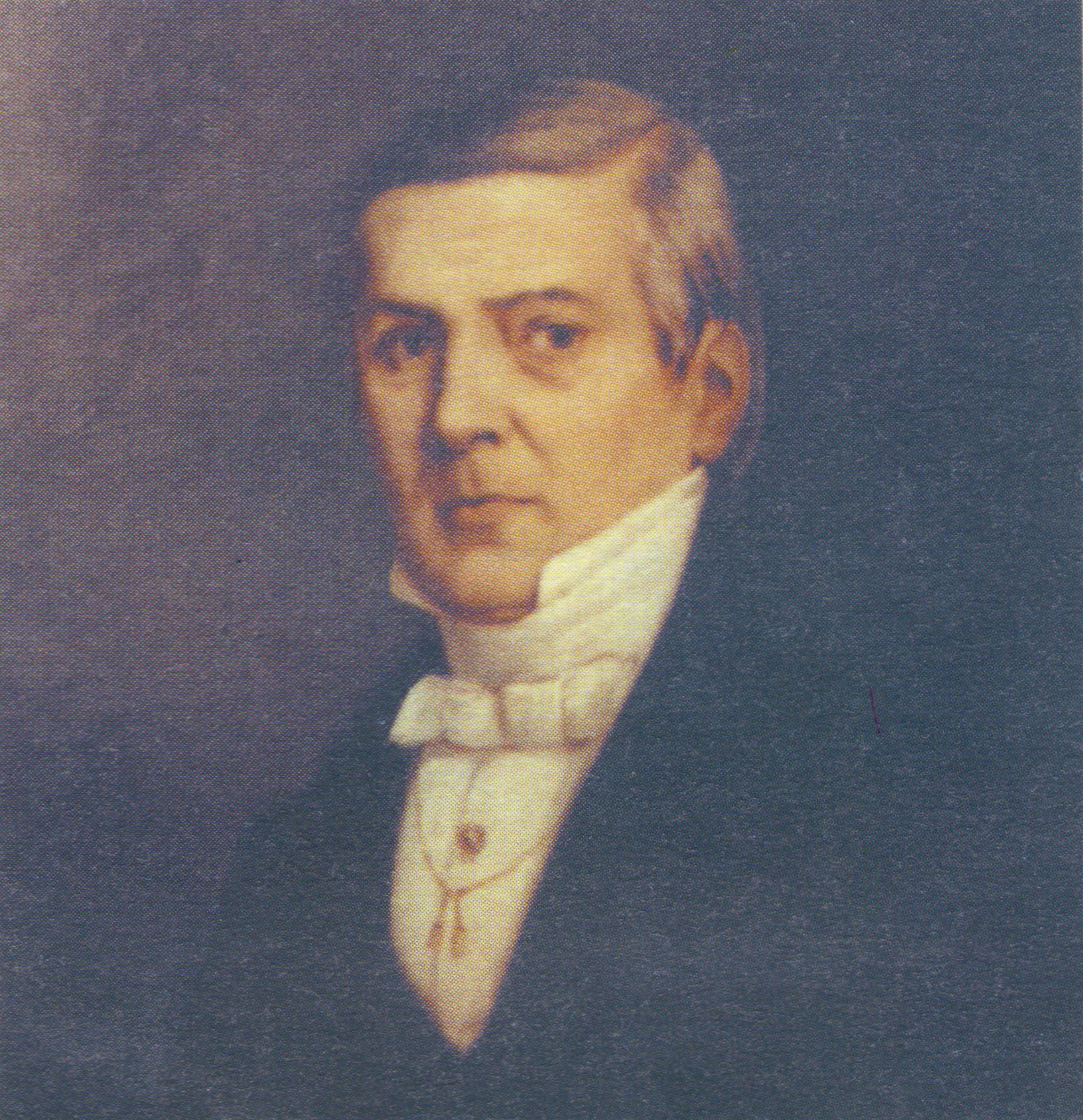
José Longinos Ellauri

José Longinos Ellauri Fernández (1789–1867) was a Uruguayan politician.

He was President of the Constituent Assembly of Uruguay in 1830. He also served as Foreign Minister in the same year.

His son José Eugenio Ellauri was President of Uruguay.

== See also ==
- Politics of Uruguay
- List of political families#Uruguay
