= Julio Herrera y Obes =

Uruguayan politician

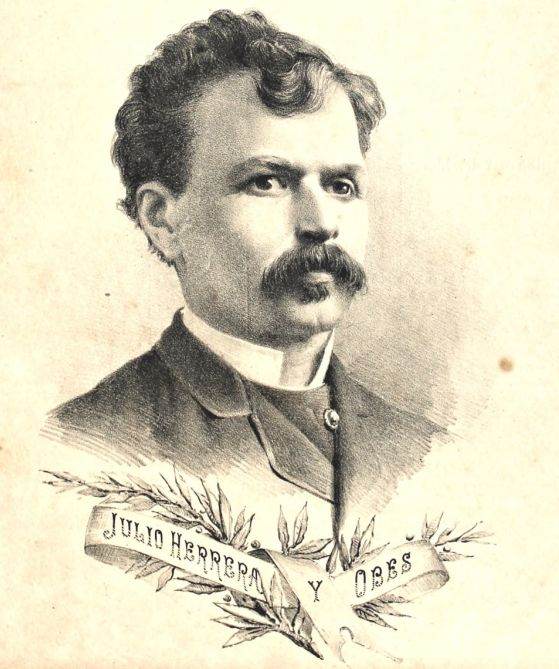

16th President of Uruguay
- In office March 1, 1890 – March 1, 1894
- Preceded by: Máximo Tajes
- Succeeded by: Duncan Stewart

Personal details
- Born: January 9, 1841 Montevideo, Uruguay
- Died: August 6, 1912 (aged 71) Montevideo, Uruguay
- Party: Colorado Party

Julio Herrera y Obes (January 9, 1841, Montevideo – August 6, 1912, Montevideo) was a Uruguayan politician who was President of Uruguay from 1890 to 1894.

== Background ==
Herrera y Obes belonged to the Colorado Party.

He had been an adviser to his predecessor, and was instrumental in the transition process that displaced the military from power.

His nephew was the poet Julio Herrera y Reissig.

== President of Uruguay ==
He served as constitutional President of Uruguay from 1890 to 1894.

He selected his aides from among a small group of friends and was convinced that the executive had to play a leading role in elections and the makeup of the General Assembly. This policy, called the "directing influence," was resisted by a sector of the Colorado Party led by José Batlle y Ordóñez, son of the former president, Lorenzo Batlle y Grau.

He weakened the military by retiring numerous officers and cutting salaries in the military.

He resigned in March 1894 on completion of his term of office, without a clear, permanent successor in sight.

During his presidency, work-related disability protection was introduced for firemen and policemen in 1892.

== Post-Presidency ==
In 1894, after much internal debate, the General Assembly appointed Juan Idiarte Borda, a member of the inner circle of the departing administration, as the new president (1894–97), following the interim administration of Duncan Stéwart, Herrera y Obes's immediate successor. But Herrera y Obes and Idiarte Borda had succeeded in irritating the National Party, when the latter was granted control of only three of the four departments agreed on in the 1872 pact between the two rival parties, and in 1897 this legacy of discontent led to an armed uprising by Blanco forces. The insurrection was led by Aparicio Saravia, a caudillo from a ranching family originally from the Brazilian state of Rio Grande do Sul who was involved in military and political affairs on both sides of the border. The Saravia revolution raised the flag of electoral guarantees, the secret ballot, and proportional representation. Military action had not yet decided the situation when President Borda was assassinated. The president of the Senate (the upper house of the General Assembly), Juan Lindolfo Cuestas (1897–1903), served as provisional president until 1899, when he was elected constitutional president. Cuestas quickly signed a peace agreement with the National Party, giving it control over six of Uruguay's departments and promising all citizens their political rights. An anticlericalist, Cuestas placed restrictions on the exercise of Roman Catholicism and tried to prevent admission to the country of friars and priests.

== Political views ==
Similar to his predecessor, he advocated for liberalism.

== See also ==
- Colorado Party (Uruguay)#Earlier History
- Politics of Uruguay

Political offices
Preceded by Máximo Tajes	President of Uruguay; 1890–1894	Succeeded by Duncan Stéwart
