= Francisco Antonino Vidal =

President of Uruguay (?–1889)

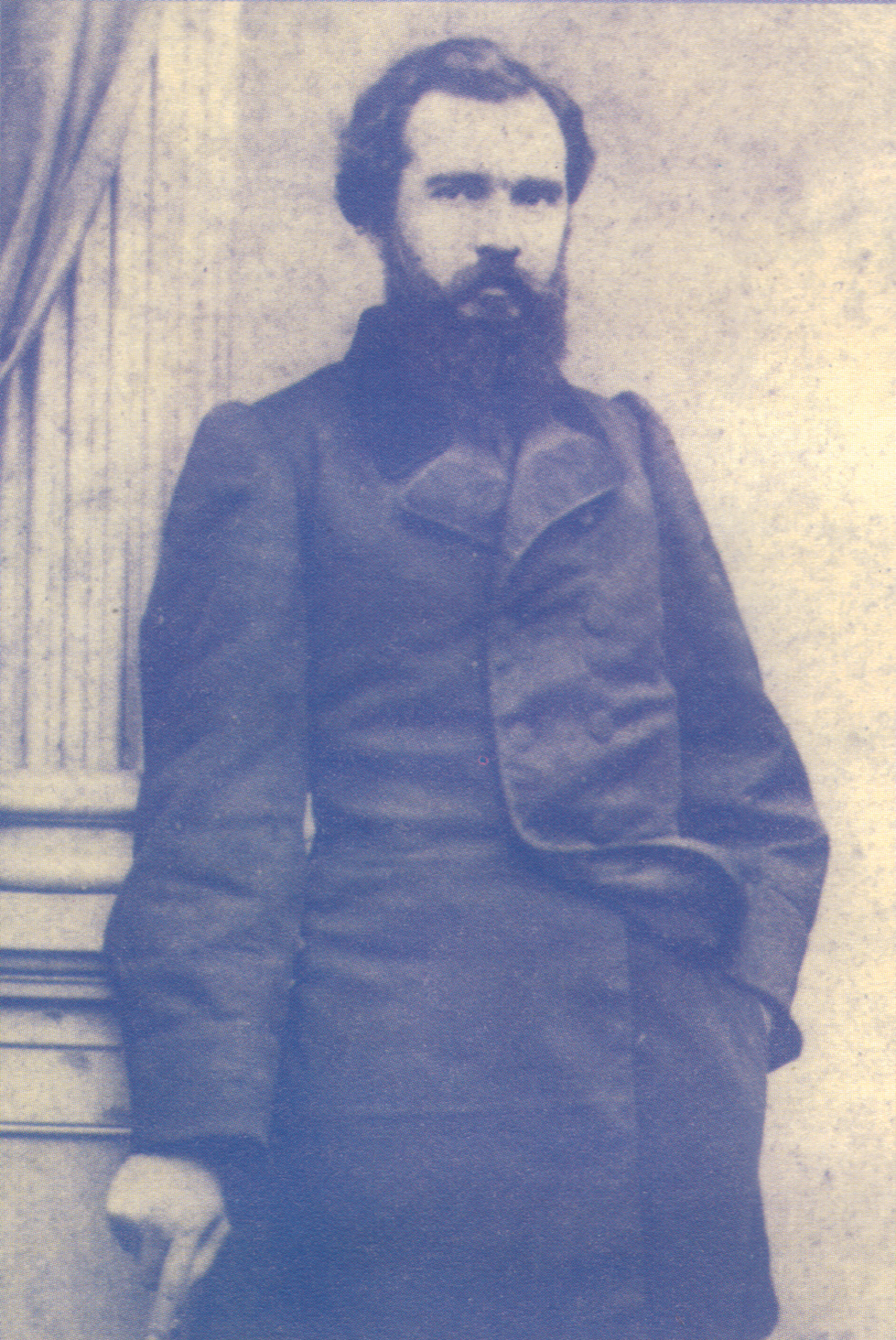

President of Uruguay
- In office 15 March 1880 – 1 March 1882
- Preceded by: Lorenzo Latorre
- Succeeded by: Máximo Santos

President of Uruguay
- In office 1 March 1886 – 24 May 1886
- Preceded by: Máximo Santos
- Succeeded by: Máximo Santos

Personal details
- Born: May 14, 1827 Montevideo, Empire of Brazil
- Died: February 7, 1889 (aged 61) Montevideo, Uruguay
- Party: Colorado Party
- Profession: Politician

Francisco Antonino Vidal (May 14, 1827 – February 7, 1889) was born in Montevideo, though his birth has also been reported as in 1825, in San Carlos, Uruguay. He was a senator and two-time president of Uruguay.

== Background and earlier political roles ==
He grew to become active in Uruguayan politics, serving as a member of the Colorado party. He was appointed interim minister of the government c. 1865, and later became a member of the Senate of Uruguay. He served as the President of the Senate of Uruguay in 1870 and 1879.

== Terms as President of Uruguay ==
He became President of Uruguay in 1880, but was forced to resign in 1882 by Máximo Santos. He became president once more in 1886, but his term only lasted a few months until Santos took over once again.

== Death ==
He died on February 7, 1889, in Montevideo.
