= José Eugenio Ellauri =

Uruguayan politician (1834–1894)

Jose Eugenio Ellauri y Obes
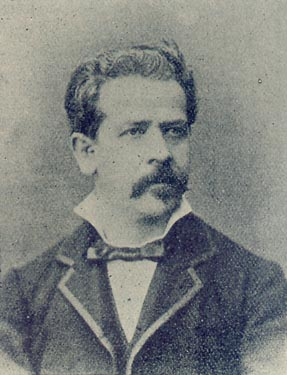

9th President of Uruguay
- In office March 1, 1873 – January 22, 1875
- Preceded by: Tomás Gomensoro Albín
- Succeeded by: Pedro Varela

Personal details
- Born: 15 November 1834 Montevideo, Uruguay
- Died: 27 December 1894 (aged 60) Montevideo, Uruguay
- Party: Colorado Party
- Profession: Lawyer

Jose Eugenio Ellauri y Obes (1834–1894) was a Uruguayan political figure who was President of Uruguay from 1873 until he was overthrown in a military coup in 1875.

== Background ==
He was a lawyer by profession, and a prominent member of the Colorado Party (Uruguay).

His father was Foreign Minister, Deputy and President of the Constituent Assembly, José Longinos Ellauri.

He served as Foreign Minister under Lorenzo Batlle y Grau from 1868 to 1872.

== President of Uruguay ==
He served as President of Uruguay from 1873 to 1875.

While President, Ellauri founded by decree the town of Villa del Carmen, in Durazno Department in 1873.

== See also ==
- Politics of Uruguay
- List of political families#Uruguay
- Colorado Party (Uruguay)#Earlier History
- Villa del Carmen#History
