= Presidency of Yamandú Orsi =

Uruguayan presidential administration from 2025 to present

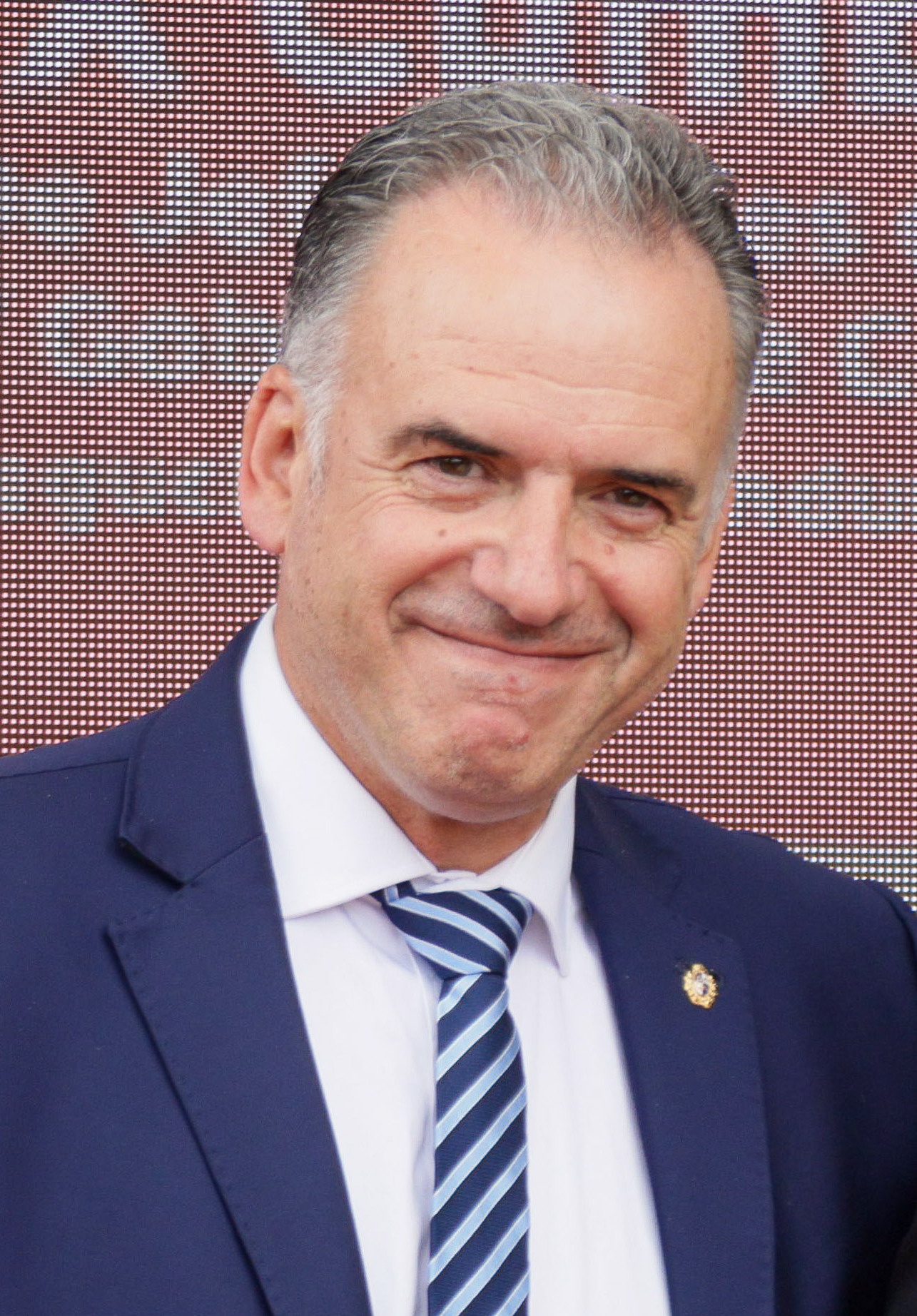
- Orsi in 2025
- Presidency of Yamandú Orsi; March 1, 2025 – present
- Vice President: Carolina Cosse
- Cabinet: See list
- Party: Broad Front
- Election: 2024
- Seat: Executive Tower

The presidency of Yamandú Orsi began on March 1, 2025, when Yamandú Orsi was inaugurated as the 43rd president of Uruguay. Orsi, a member of the Movement of Popular Participation – Broad Front, took office following his victory over the National Party nominee Álvaro Delgado in the second round of the 2024 general election.

== Background ==
=== Campaign and election ===
Orsi's candidacy for the Broad Front presidential primary for president of Uruguay in the 2024 election was made official on December 8, 2023, during the party congress. In late February 2024, he resigned as Intendant of Canelones. He won his party's primary with 59% of the vote, and announced Carolina Cosse as his running mate for the general election. He was opposed to the two constitutional referendums put to the electorate on changes to the social security system and on allowing nighttime police raids.

In the first round of the general election, the Orsi-Cosse ticket obtained 43.86% of the vote, securing a majority in the Senate. On November 17, Orsi participated in a presidential debate with the candidate of the National Party and Republican Coalition, Álvaro Delgado Ceretta. In the runoff of the election, Orsi won the presidency with 52.08%.

=== Transition period ===
After the results were announced, outgoing President Luis Lacalle Pou congratulated Orsi on his victory and announced that he was available to begin the transition period. The day after the runoff, Orsi visited former President José Mujica and his wife, former Vice President Lucía Topolansky, at their private residence on the outskirts of Montevideo. After Venezuelan president Nicolás Maduro congratulated Orsi, members of the Herrerism, a sector of the National Party, publicly asked him "not to invite dictators" to his inauguration.

On Wednesday, November 27, Orsi was received by outgoing President Lacalle Pou at the Executive Tower, which officially marked the beginning of the transition. The transition team chose the Hampton by Hilton hotel in Carrasco as the transition venue, where the president-elect held meetings with diplomats and politicians.

On November 28, Orsi traveled with Gabriel Oddone, Alejandro Sánchez and his foreign policy advisor to Brasília to meet with President Luiz Inácio Lula da Silva. At the meeting, talks were initiated to accelerate the bidding processes for the Yaguarón bridge in Cerro Largo and the dredging of the São Gonçalo Channel that connects the Lagoon Mirim―shared by Brazil and Uruguay―with the Lagoa dos Patos, located in Brazilian territory. That day, the transition between the outgoing vice president Beatriz Argimón and the elected Carolina Cosse began.

On December 6, the Mercosur summit began in Montevideo, in which Orsi participated alongside outgoing President Lacalle Pou as his "guest". The final text of the EU–Mercosur Association Agreement was approved in the presence of the President of the European Commission Ursula Von der Leyen, after almost 25 years of negotiations. Within the framework of this summit, Orsi held bilateral meetings with regional leaders who came to Montevideo, such as Colombian President Gustavo Petro, Bolivian President Luis Arce and Paraguayan President Santiago Peña.

Beginning in the second week of December, some cabinet members were announced. However, the formal announcement took place on the December 16, at the Raddison Victoria Plaza Hotel.

== Cabinet ==
Cabinet of Yamandú Orsi's Government
Office	Name	Political party	Term
Ministry of National Defense	Sandra Lazo	Broad Front	1 March 2025 –
Ministry of the Interior	Carlos Negro	Broad Front	1 March 2025 –
Ministry of Foreign Relations	Mario Lubetkin	Broad Front	1 March 2025 –
Ministry of Economy and Finance	Gabriel Oddone	Broad Front	1 March 2025 –
Ministry of Education and Culture	José Carlos Mahía	Broad Front	1 March 2025 –
Ministry of Public Health	Cristina Lustemberg	Broad Front	1 March 2025 –
Ministry of Social Development	Gonzalo Civila	Broad Front	1 March 2025 –
Ministry of Labour and Social Welfare	Juan Castillo	Broad Front	1 March 2025 –
Ministry of Transport and Public Works	Lucía Etcheverry	Broad Front	1 March 2025 –
Ministry of Livestock, Agriculture, and Fisheries	Alfredo Fratti	Broad Front	1 March 2025 –
Ministry of Industry, Energy and Mining	Fernanda Cardona	Broad Front	1 March 2025 –
Ministry of Housing and Territorial Planning	Cecilia Cairo	Broad Front	1 March 2025 – 18 April 2025
Ministry of Housing and Territorial Planning	Tamara Paseyro	Broad Front	21 April 2025 –
Ministry of Justice and Human Rights		Broad Front	To be created
Ministry of Tourism	Pablo Menoni	Broad Front	1 March 2025 –
Ministry of Environment	Edgardo Ortuño	Broad Front	1 March 2025 –
Secretariat of Sports	Alejandro Pereda	Broad Front	1 March 2025 –
Secretariat of Science, Technology and Innovation		Broad Front	To be created
Secretariat of the Presidency	Alejandro Sánchez	Broad Front	1 March 2025 –
Deputy Secretariat of the Presidency	Jorge Díaz Almeida	Broad Front	1 March 2025 –
Office of Planning and Budget	Rodrigo Arim	Broad Front	1 March 2025 –
Central Bank of Uruguay	Guillermo Tolosa	Broad Front	1 March 2025 –

== Foreign policy ==
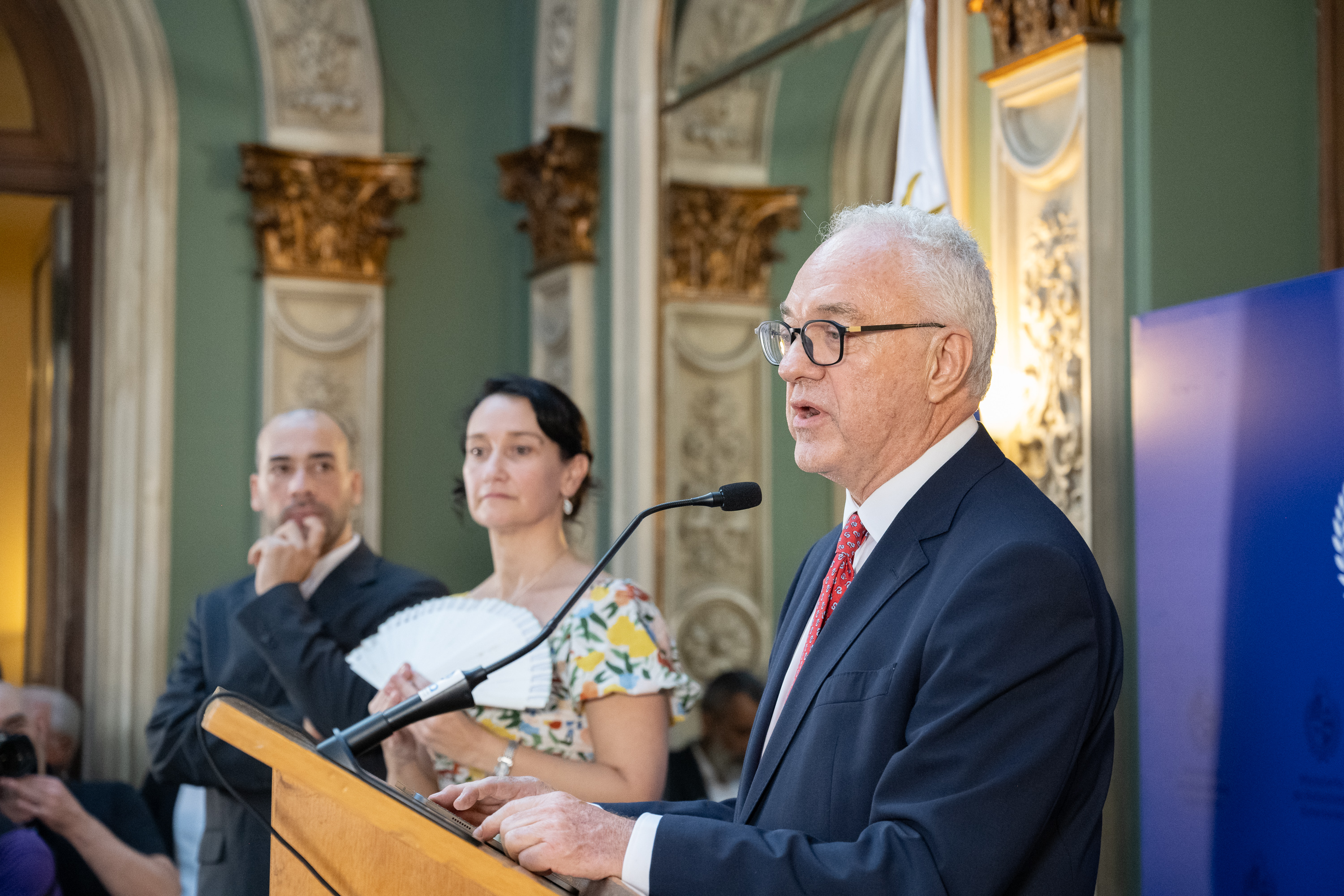
Inauguration of the senior officials of the Ministry of Foreign Affairs of the government presided over by Yamandú Orsi.

The foreign relations of Uruguay during the government of Yamandú Orsi began with his government on 1 March 2025. The foreign minister, officially Minister of Foreign Affairs of Uruguay, of the government of Yamandú Orsi is Mario Lubetkin.

=== Africa ===
==== Angola ====
Within the framework of the 17th BRICS Summit, held in Brazil, on Sunday 6 July 2025 President Yamandú Orsi held a bilateral meeting with the president of Angola and of the African Union, João Lourenço.

==== Democratic Republic of the Congo ====
During the government transition, on Saturday 25 January, president-elect Yamandú Orsi conveyed his condolences on social media to the families of the wounded Uruguayan soldiers and that of a soldier who had died while serving in the peacekeeping mission in the Democratic Republic of the Congo ―MONUSCO― because of an attack by the rebel group M23 that occurred that same day. Because of this attack, the return of the contingent of 200 Uruguayan soldiers, initially planned for January, was delayed. In mid-June it was confirmed that they would arrive on the night of 3 July, although they ultimately did so the following day in a ceremony with the president of the Republic. That same day, another contingent of 200 Uruguayan soldiers departed as relief, which finally managed to enter the Congo from Uganda on Wednesday 6 August 2025 after delays caused by local clashes.

On 6 August, President Orsi received at the Executive Tower a DRC delegation headed by the African country's deputy prime minister, Guy Kabombo Muadiamvita. At the meeting, homage was paid to Uruguay's cooperation for peace in that country and President Orsi promised a visit to the country. Likewise, authorities from both delegations signed documents: a cooperation agreement and a memorandum of understanding on political consultations, signed by Foreign Minister Lubetkin and his counterpart Thérèse Kayikwamba Wagner; a defense cooperation agreement; and a cultural cooperation agreement.

==== Egypt ====
Within the framework of the 17th BRICS Summit, held in Brazil, on Sunday 6 July 2025 President Yamandú Orsi held a bilateral meeting with the prime minister of Egypt, Mostafa Madbouly.

==== South Africa ====
Within the framework of the 17th BRICS Summit, held in Brazil in July 2025, in a meeting of the delegations of Uruguay and South Africa, President Cyril Ramaphosa invited the Uruguayan president to take part in the G20 Summit, to be held in November in that African country.

=== Americas ===
==== Argentina ====
On Saturday 1 March 2025, the day of Yamandú Orsi's inauguration, Argentine president Javier Milei did not travel to the inauguration of his Uruguayan counterpart because it coincided with the opening of the legislative sessions in Argentina. In early March, Diego Cánepa, prosecretary of the presidency of José Mujica between 2010 and 2015, was appointed ambassador to Argentina. On Thursday 27 March 2025, President Yamandú Orsi met with the governor of Entre Ríos, Rogelio Frigerio, where they agreed on the idea of preventing friction from escalating over the siting of a project to produce green hydrogen in the department of Paysandú, on the Uruguay River, as had happened decades earlier around the installation of pulp mills. On Monday 28 April, President Orsi received the credentials of the new Argentine ambassador to Uruguay, Alan Beraud. On Thursday 8 May, President Orsi attended the inauguration ceremony of the authorities of the Salto Grande Mixed Technical Commission.

On Monday 9 June, President Orsi and former presidents Lacalle Pou and Sanguinetti travelled to Buenos Aires to receive the Anne Frank Award for their commitment to democracy and peaceful coexistence. On Thursday 19 June, when the press asked him about the conviction of former Argentine president Cristina Fernández de Kirchner, President Orsi said that "as a government, it is not a good thing for us to get involved in the affairs of other countries", unlike some Broad Front legislators who publicly stated that Uruguay should express itself against the corruption sentence handed down by the Argentine justice system against Fernández.

On Wednesday 2 July, Yamandú Orsi travelled to Argentina, after a state visit to Spain, to participate the following day in the 66th Summit of Mercosur presidents, held in Buenos Aires. That Wednesday, President Orsi received a doctor honoris causa award from the Universidad de Congreso, in Mendoza. The following day, the president took part in the Summit and defended the "deepening" of the bloc. That day he also held a brief bilateral meeting with Argentine president Javier Milei. Months later, one day after the midterm elections in Argentina, on Monday 27 before the Senate budget committee, Minister Gabriel Oddone valued President Milei's electoral victory for the stability it brings to markets, which in his opinion also benefits Uruguay.

On Monday 3 November, President Yamandú Orsi took part in the launch of Nodo Uruguay, an initiative of the Argentine civil association Grandmothers of Plaza de Mayo and the Commission for the Right to Identity, which promotes joint work between Uruguay and Argentina to find grandchildren born between 1975 and 1983, victims of the actions of the repressive forces during the civic-military dictatorship. On Wednesday 26 November, Foreign Minister Mario Lubetkin met with his Argentine counterpart Pablo Quirno at the headquarters of the Uruguayan Foreign Ministry to analyze several issues, including the project to install a green hydrogen plant in Paysandú.

On Wednesday 21 January 2026, in a plenary session of the Río de la Plata Administrative Commission ―CARP― Argentina and Uruguay approved the specifications for the call for bids for the maintenance and improvements of the Martín García Channel. On Wednesday 4 February, President Orsi travelled to Argentina to attend an event organized by the Inter-American Council of Commerce and Production. On Wednesday 18 March, President Orsi spoke with the Argentine ambassador to Uruguay after criticism by the governor of Entre Ríos, Rogelio Frigerio, over the installation of a green hydrogen plant in Paysandú.

==== Bolivia ====
On Monday 20 October 2025, Uruguay congratulated the candidate Rodrigo Paz Pereira on his election as president of the Plurinational State of Bolivia in the elections of the previous day, as well as greeted the Bolivian people for the development of the electoral process and highlighted the bicentenary of independence shared by both countries. President Yamandú Orsi arrived on Friday 7 November in La Paz, Bolivia, to take part the following day in the inauguration ceremony of Rodrigo Paz Pereira as the new president of the Plurinational State of Bolivia.

On Saturday 28 February 2026, the Uruguayan Foreign Ministry expressed its solidarity with Bolivia over the air accident in El Alto that had occurred the previous day. On Friday 13 February, the Uruguayan drug trafficker Sebastián Marset, one of the criminals most wanted by the United States Drug Enforcement Administration ―DEA―, was arrested in the early hours of that Friday in Santa Cruz de la Sierra, Bolivia, ending more than two years of international search for the Uruguayan drug trafficker. The following day, the Bolivian president expressed on his social media his thanks for the recognition sent by his counterparts from Uruguay and Paraguay, Yamandú Orsi and Santiago Peña, and the U.S. State Department, after the capture of Sebastián Marset.

==== Brazil ====
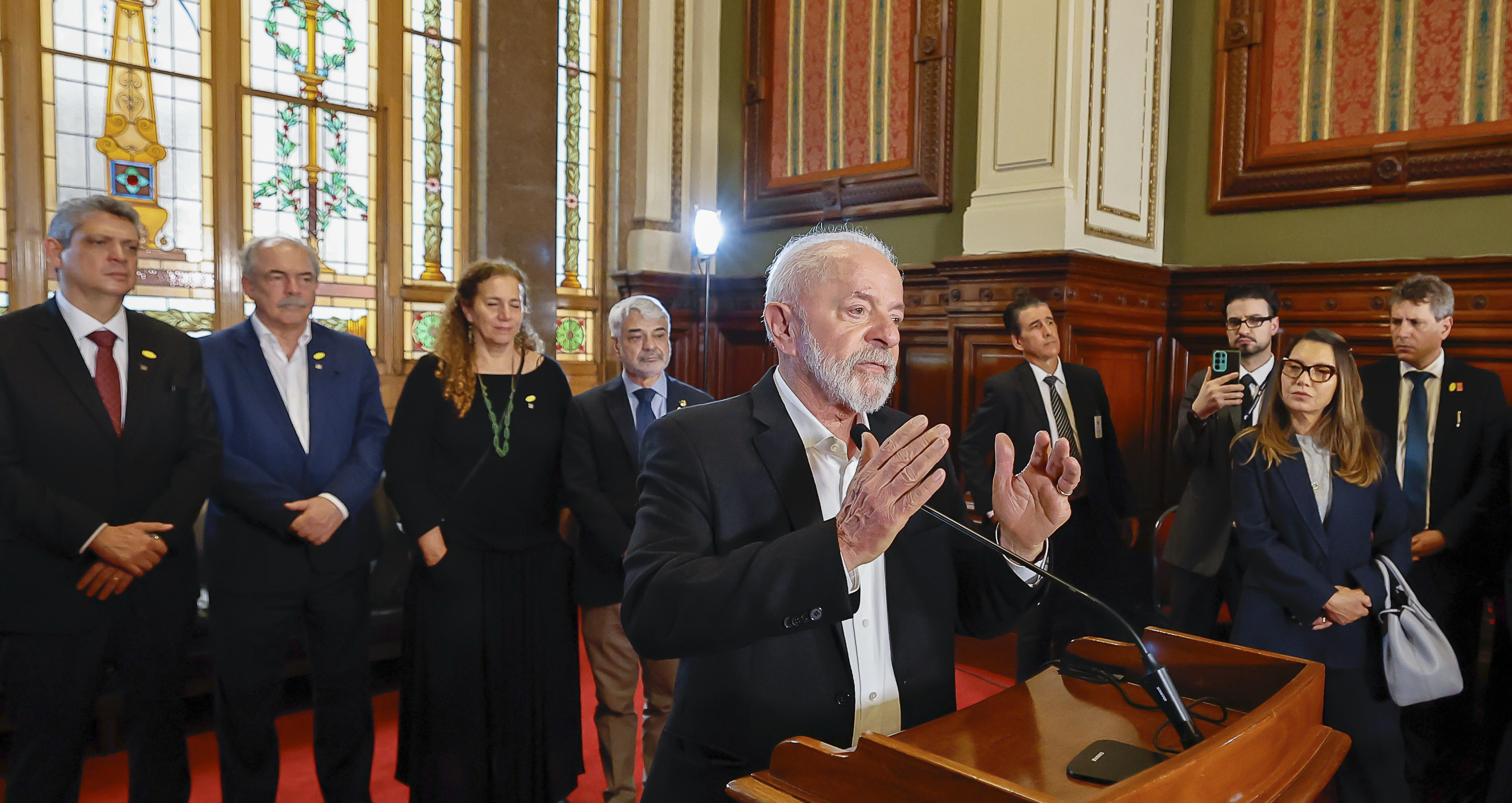
Brazilian president Lula da Silva at the Legislative Palace of Uruguay during the funeral of José Mujica.

Shortly after winning the elections in November 2024, Yamandú Orsi's first official trip abroad was to Brazil, meeting in Brasília with Brazilian president Lula da Silva on Friday 29 November. There they discussed the bidding processes for the Yaguarón bridge in Cerro Largo and the dredging of the São Gonçalo Channel that connects Lagoon Mirim ―shared by Brazil and Uruguay― with the Lagoa dos Patos ―in Brazilian territory―. Later, president-elect Orsi had other meetings with the Brazilian president, such as at the MERCOSUR Summit in December 2024 and a dinner before his presidential inauguration on 1 March 2025.

On 1 March 2025, President Lula da Silva invited Uruguay, together with Mexico and Colombia, to participate in the BRICS summit scheduled for July 2025 in Rio de Janeiro. Likewise, in early March the Uruguayan government appointed Rodolfo Nin Novoa, former vice president between 2005 and 2010 and former foreign minister between 2015 and 2020, as ambassador to Brazil. On 9 April, within the framework of the 9th CELAC Summit, Brazil gave the first political support for Uruguay to hold the pro tempore presidency of CELAC from 2026, which was voted on at the end of the day. On 7 May, President Lula presented a bill to the Brazilian Congress to authorize the donation of two Bell 206 helicopters to Uruguay. On Thursday 15 May, President Lula da Silva was present at the Legislative Palace to take part in the wake of former president José Mujica, who died on Tuesday 13 May at the age of 89.

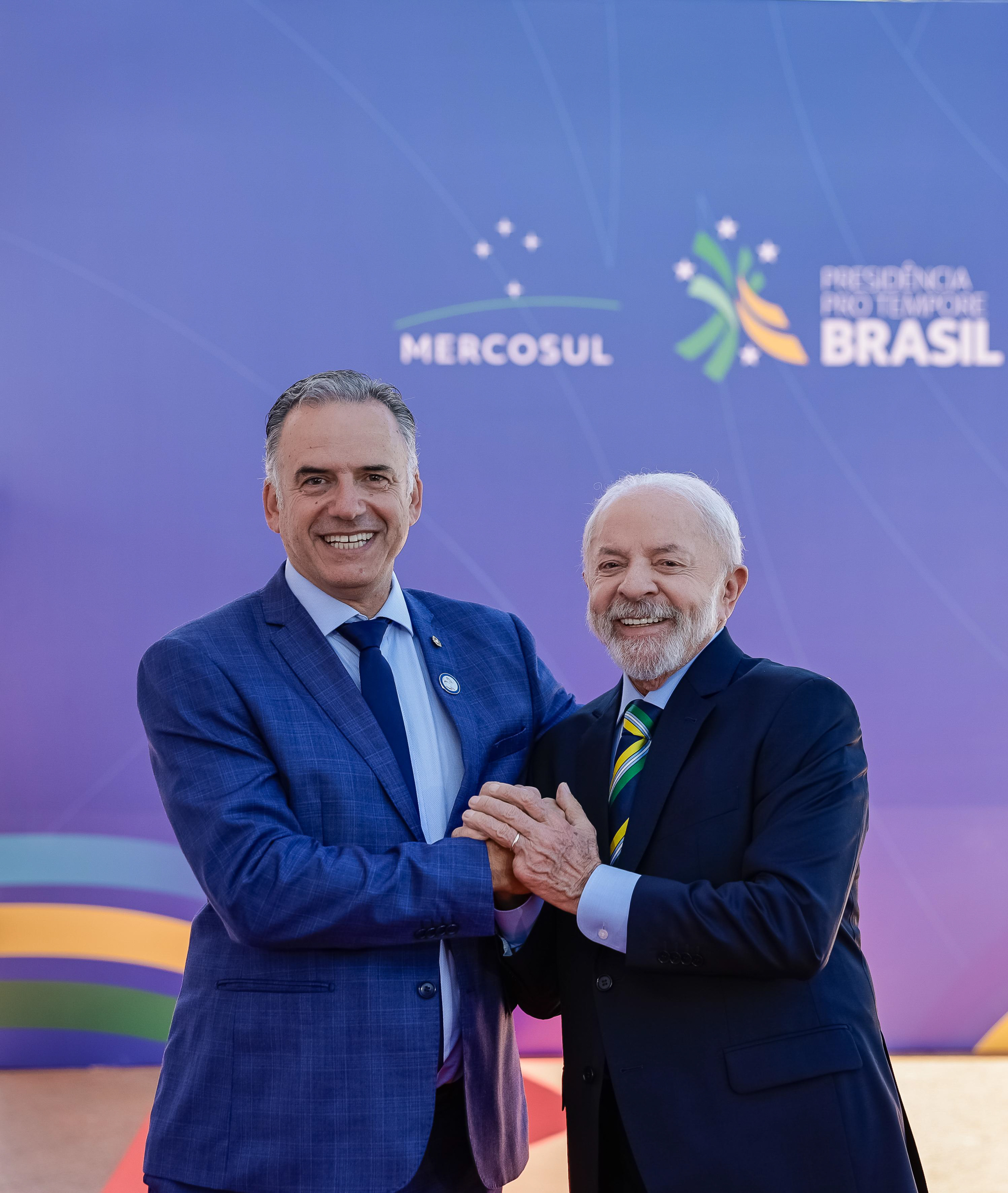
Yamandú Orsi and Lula da Silva at the 67th Summit of MERCOSUR Presidents in December 2025.

On Tuesday 10 June, various media outlets reported how the Brazilian state company Eletrobras was building a wind farm in the area of Rincón de Artigas, land disputed between Brazil and Uruguay, without the work being officially announced and without having held dialogue with Uruguay. The following day, the Foreign Ministry sent a note verbale to Brazil, in which it made "express record" that the construction of the Wind Farm, a process begun in 2021, does not imply recognition of Brazil's exercise of sovereignty over Rincón de Artigas, and requested the resumption of the issue of the disputed territory. On Friday 4 July, Yamandú Orsi travelled to Rio de Janeiro to take part in the 17th BRICS Summit, from 6 to 7 July. He was received on Sunday 6 by Brazilian president Lula da Silva at the Museum of Modern Art of Rio de Janeiro. Yamandú Orsi returned to Uruguay from Brazil on Wednesday 9 July, after a tour that also included Spain and Argentina. In late July, Orsi met with Lula at a summit held in Chile with other presidents where a joint editorial entitled "Democracy always", signed by the presidents, was presented.

On Friday 19 December, President Orsi travelled to the Brazilian city of Foz do Iguaçu to take part in the 67th Summit of MERCOSUR Presidents, in the context of the European Commission's decision to postpone until January a possible signing of the agreement between the European Union and the regional bloc, which had been scheduled for that Saturday. At the Foz do Iguaçu Summit, Uruguay and Brazil were the only countries that did not sign a document for the democratic restoration of Venezuela that had as points: the demand for institutionality, a transparent electoral timetable, the release of political prisoners, attention to the humanitarian crisis, and commitment to the Inter-American Democratic Charter; Uruguay argued this under the premise of not deepening Caracas's isolation, which in practice left Uruguay aligned with Brazil. In late December, Brazil relaunched relaunched the tender for the dredging of the Laguna Merín – Canal San Gonzalo waterway, suspended because of the climate catastrophe of May 2024.

In late April 2026, Brazil announced that the dredging of the Laguna Merín – Canal San Gonzalo waterway would begin before June.

==== Chile ====
During the stage of the government transition, on Monday 3 February 2025, Chilean president Gabriel Boric visited Uruguay, meeting with President Luis Lacalle Pou, former president José Mujica and president-elect Yamandú Orsi. One day before Orsi's inauguration, Petro attended the dinner organized by Brazilian president Lula Da Silva where Yamandú Orsi and Colombian president Gustavo Petro also attended. Likewise, Boric attended President Orsi's inauguration on 1 March 2025. On Thursday 15 May, President Boric was present at the Legislative Palace to take part in the wake of former president José Mujica, who died on Tuesday 13 May at the age of 89.

On Tuesday 6 June, Foreign Minister Mario Lubetkin signed the 69th Additional Protocol to Economic Complementation Agreement No. 35 between MERCOSUR and the Republic of Chile, in order to modernize the Origin Regime applicable to goods traded between the parties. On Sunday 20 July, President Orsi travelled to Chile to take part in a summit between the presidents of Chile, Brazil, Colombia and Spain to debate the strengthening of democracy in the region, the fight against disinformation, multilateralism, the reduction of inequalities and the regulation of emerging technologies, in order to present the conclusions at the 80th sessions of the United Nations General Assembly, in New York. Likewise, to draft and present a joint editorial entitled "Democracy always", signed by the presidents. On Tuesday 8 October, President Orsi received former president of Chile Michelle Bachelet at the Executive Tower. On Monday 15 December, President Orsi greeted José Antonio Kast, elected president of Chile the previous day.

On Tuesday 20 January 2026, the Uruguayan Foreign Ministry expressed its solidarity with Chile over its wildfires in Ñuble and Biobío. On Thursday 22 January, it was announced that Uruguay would send 31 firefighters to Chile the following day to fight the wildfires. On Tuesday 10 March, President Orsi travelled to Chile where he was received by President Gabriel Boric, and the following day he took part in the change-of-command ceremony of President José Antonio Kast.

==== Colombia ====
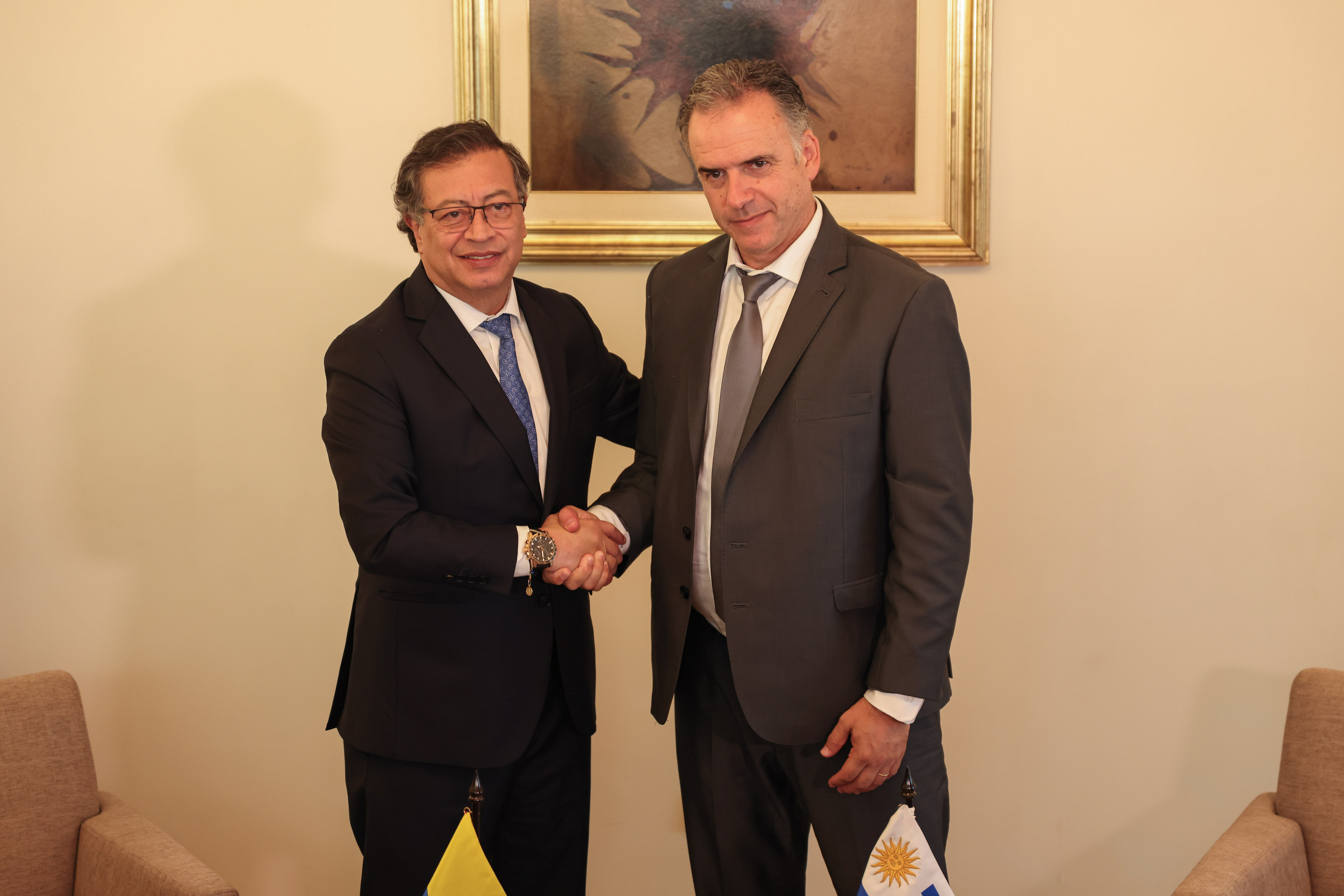
First meeting between Colombian president Gustavo Petro and his Uruguayan counterpart Yamandú Orsi, then president-elect, at the MERCOSUR summit held in Montevideo in December 2024.

During the stage of the government transition, Orsi had a bilateral meeting with Colombian president Gustavo Petro within the framework of the MERCOSUR Summit held in Montevideo in December 2024. One day before Orsi's inauguration, Petro attended the dinner organized by Brazilian president Lula Da Silva where Yamandú Orsi himself and Chilean president Gabriel Boric also attended. Likewise, Petro attended President Orsi's inauguration on 1 March 2025. The following day, they held a bilateral meeting at the Estévez Palace. During the 9th CELAC Summit in April 2025, Petro and Orsi held another bilateral meeting where they reached agreements in areas such as energy, medicine and science.

On 8 June 2025, the Uruguayan Foreign Ministry issued a statement expressing its condemnation of the attack against the senator of the Republic of Colombia, Miguel Uribe Turbay, which occurred the previous day. In late July, Orsi met with Petro at a summit held in Chile with other presidents where a joint editorial entitled "Democracy always", signed by the presidents, was presented. On Monday 11 August, the Uruguayan Foreign Ministry issued a statement expressing "its deepest condolences to the Colombian State and people" on the death of Colombian senator Miguel Uribe Turbay, which occurred that same day. On Friday 22 August, the Uruguayan Foreign Ministry condemned the attacks perpetrated the previous day in Colombia, in the municipality of Amalfi, Antioquia department, and in the city of Cali, Cauca department, which caused the deaths of members of the National Police, innocent civilians and dozens of injuries.

On Friday 20 February 2026, President Yamandú Orsi arrived in Colombia where he was received by his counterpart Gustavo Petro, in the context of the 10th Summit of Heads of State of CELAC where the following day Colombia handed the organization's pro tempore presidency to Uruguay.

==== Ecuador ====
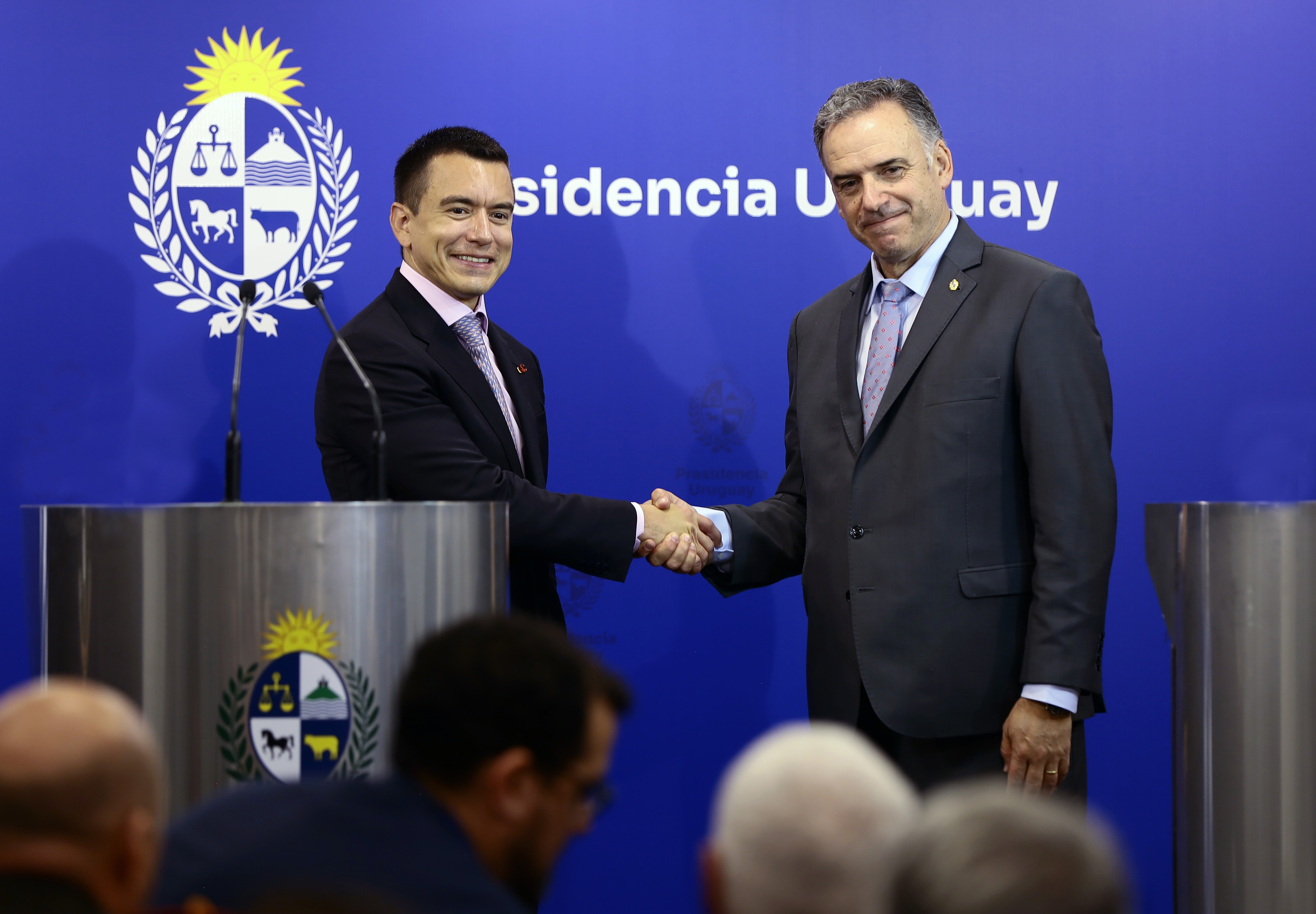
Ecuadorian president Daniel Noboa with Uruguayan president Yamandú Orsi during the Ecuadorian president's visit to Uruguay in August 2025.

On Sunday 13 April 2025, the second round of the presidential elections of Ecuador was held, which gave President Daniel Noboa as the winner after the confirmation of its National Electoral Council after a process that generated political tensions and with the Correísta candidate Luisa González dismissing the election results. The Uruguayan Foreign Ministry and the president waited until the afternoon of Monday 14 April to recognize Daniel Noboa as the winner of the elections. Deputy Foreign Minister Valeria Csukasi attended the second inauguration of Daniel Noboa on 24 May.

On Tuesday 19 August 2025, President Yamandú Orsi received his Ecuadorian counterpart Daniel Noboa in Uruguay, within the framework of a tour that the Ecuadorian president began in Brazil and would continue in Argentina, and where they signed two bilateral agreements on security, and Uruguay received from Ecuador the pro tempore presidency of the Brasília Consensus.

On Monday 16 March, former Ecuadorian president Rafael Correa visited Uruguay where he was received by Broad Front authorities, which caused controversy among the opposition due to the eight-year prison sentence that Correa has with the Ecuadorian justice system, which since 2022 has requested his extradition to Ecuador.

==== Paraguay ====
During the stage of the government transition, Orsi had a bilateral meeting with Paraguayan president Santiago Peña within the framework of the MERCOSUR Summit held in Montevideo in December 2024. As a result of that meeting, Orsi informed the Paraguayan president of his intention to maintain Uruguay's position of support for Paraguayan foreign minister Rubén Ramírez Lezcano as a candidate to chair the OAS. However, a few days after taking office, Uruguay gave its support to the Surinamese foreign minister, Albert Ramdin. On Saturday 4 October, from Fray Bentos, President Yamandú Orsi reported that he had maintained contacts with Paraguayan authorities to coordinate the investigation into the attack suffered by the home of prosecutor Mónica Ferrero in the early hours of Sunday 28 September 2025.

On Saturday 17 January 2026, President Yamandú Orsi attended the city of Asunción to take part in the signing of the agreement between MERCOSUR and the European Union.

==== Peru ====
On 30 June 2025, the Uruguayan Foreign Ministry announced that progress would be made in a bilateral deepening with Peru in accordance with Economic Complementation Agreement No. 58 ―ACE 58―, the agreement between MERCOSUR and Peru of 2005.

==== Venezuela ====
Avatar of Mario Lubetkin

Mario Lubetkin
(@@MinLubetkinUy)
tweeted:

I happily announce to you the release of Uruguayan citizen Fabián Buglione.

It was this afternoon, in Venezuela.

I thank all the people who made this good news possible for all Uruguayans.

18 July 2025

The day after taking office, on Sunday 2 March 2025, Foreign Minister Mario Lubetkin, in an interview with the Spanish outlet El Mundo, stated that Uruguay would stop recognizing Edmundo González Urrutia as president-elect of Venezuela, but would not recognize the government of Nicolás Maduro, which he also described as a dictatorship. "If the Oslo peace accords exist, why cannot the Montevideo ones exist?", the Uruguayan foreign minister said regarding the Venezuelan situation. This marked a rupture with the action taken by the Lacalle Pou government on Friday 2 August 2024, when it recognized Edmundo González Urrutia as the winner of the 2024 Venezuelan elections and as president-elect of the South American country.

Avatar of Secretary Marco Rubio

Secretary Marco Rubio
(@SecRubio)
tweeted:

Thanks to @POTUS's leadership, ten Americans who were detained in Venezuela are on their way to freedom. I want to thank my team at the @StateDept & especially President @nayibbukele for helping secure an agreement for the release of all of our American detainees, plus the release of Venezuelan political prisoners.

18 July 2025

On Friday 6 June, Foreign Minister Lubetkin contacted the wife of Fabián Buglione, the Uruguayan detained in Venezuela since 19 October 2024. The foreign minister conveyed to her that Uruguay remained committed to efforts to secure Fabián Buglione's release. After the conversation, the foreign minister held an interview with the outlet El Observador, in which he described as a "strange status" the situation of Uruguay's relations with Venezuela, with the embassies closed but without having broken diplomatic relations. On Thursday 12 June, the Foreign Ministry issued a statement reporting on the reactivation shortly of Venezuelan consular services in Montevideo and Uruguayan consular services in Caracas.

On Friday 18 July, Foreign Minister Mario Lubetkin announced on the social network X the release by the regime of Venezuela of the Uruguayan Fabián Buglione, imprisoned in that country for nine months. Buglione's whereabouts were traced to Helicoide, and later he was held in Rodeo I prison. The negotiations to free Buglione were led by the United States, since the Uruguayan has a permanent residence permit in that country, where he has lived for 30 years, and his release occurred together with those of nine other American citizens. Likewise, the U.S. secretary of state, Marco Rubio, also thanked on X the president of El Salvador, Nayib Bukele, since the release of the Americans was achieved in exchange for the release of Venezuelans imprisoned in El Salvador.

On Thursday 24 July, Venezuela resumed consular activity in Uruguay with a first day of delivery of Venezuelan passports, after almost a year of closure on 29 July 2024: one day after Nicolás Maduro claimed electoral victory, and when he ordered the withdrawal of diplomatic personnel from Uruguay and six other countries, considering them "interventionist".

On Friday 19 December, President Orsi travelled to the Brazilian city of Foz do Iguaçu to take part in the 67th Summit of MERCOSUR Presidents. At that Summit, Uruguay and Brazil were the only countries that did not sign a document for the democratic restoration of Venezuela that had as points: the demand for institutionality, a transparent electoral timetable, the release of political prisoners, attention to the humanitarian crisis, and commitment to the Inter-American Democratic Charter; Uruguay argued this under the premise of not deepening Caracas's isolation, which in practice left Uruguay aligned with Brazil.

On 3 January 2026, the Uruguayan Foreign Ministry rejected the U.S. military intervention in Venezuela that apprehended Venezuelan president Nicolás Maduro that same day. After the detention of Nicolás Maduro, Foreign Minister Lubetkin held direct dialogue with his Venezuelan counterpart Yván Gil. The following day, President Yamandú Orsi, after returning from his personal holidays, held an emergency meeting with his ministers on the situation in Venezuela. That same day, the Uruguayan government together with the Brazilian, Chilean, Colombian, Mexican and Spanish governments launched a statement on the events that occurred in Venezuela and reaffirming their attachment to the principles enshrined in the Charter of the United Nations. On Tuesday 6 January 2026, the OAS held a special session to address the situation in Venezuela, where Uruguay's representative, Edison Lanza, denounced the situation. On Wednesday 7 January, the Permanent Commission of the Uruguayan Parliament made a declaration on the situation in Venezuela, but because of the debate a consensus one was not reached.

On Thursday 8 January, President Orsi considered that Maduro's fall was good news "to the extent that the authoritarian regime ceases to exist and a democracy appears" although it was not for his office to condemn the regime, when consulted by the outlet Telemundo. In response to President Orsi's remarks, that same day Venezuelan foreign minister Yván Gil criticized the Uruguayan president's statements.

==== Cuba ====
On 23 May 2025, Broad Front senator Blanca Rodríguez received Cuban ambassador Antonio Pardo in Parliament, in a meeting where they discussed "the necessary strengthening of bilateral parliamentary ties", according to what was reported by the Embassy of Cuba in Uruguay. On Thursday 19 February 2026, Foreign Minister Lubetkin appeared before the Permanent Commission of the Legislative Branch, where he stated that Uruguay would have no problem sending humanitarian aid in the then context of the Cuban crisis. On Wednesday 4 March, the Senate approved, only with Broad Front votes, a declaration rejecting the deepening of the "United States blockade of Cuba".

==== Guatemala ====
The Guatemalan president Bernardo Arévalo, who was born in Uruguayan territory, attended Yamandú Orsi's inauguration on 1 March 2025. The following day, in a meeting between both presidents, President Arévalo expressed interest in the Plan Ceibal and in cooperating in favor of multilateralism. Both presidents delved into this area in a bilateral meeting within the framework of the 9th CELAC Summit, held in early April 2025 in Honduras. On Thursday 20 November 2025, Guatemalan vice president Karin Herrera visited Uruguay, where she met with Vice President Carolina Cosse. On Wednesday 24 November, the Uruguayan Foreign Ministry announced five projects approved in a technical cooperation meeting between Uruguay and Guatemala.

==== Honduras ====
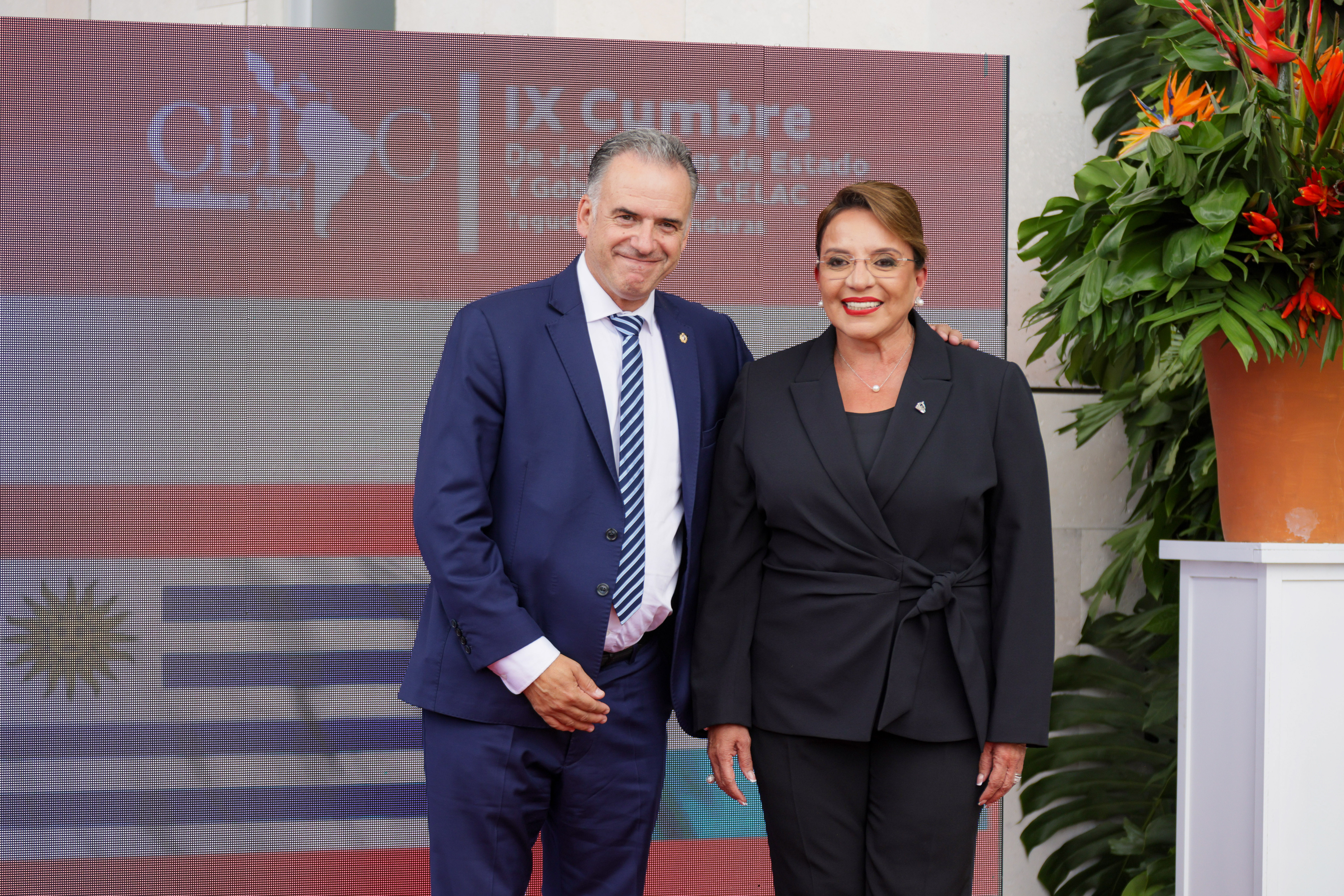
Yamandú Orsi with Honduran president Xiomara Castro during the 2025 CELAC Summit.

The Honduran president Xiomara Castro attended Yamandú Orsi's inauguration on 1 March 2025. After a trip by President Orsi to Panama, the first of his government, he travelled on Tuesday 8 April to Honduras, with the aim of taking part in the 9th Summit of the CELAC held in Tegucigalpa, capital of Honduras. On Thursday 25 December 2025, the Uruguayan government congratulated Nasry Asfura on being elected president of Honduras; this after the proclamation by the National Electoral Council of Honduras the previous day, which confirmed the winner of the elections of 30 November 2025 after nearly a month of counting.

==== Panama ====
The Panamanian president José Raúl Mulino attended Yamandú Orsi's inauguration on 1 March 2025. On Sunday 6 April, President Orsi, together with a delegation made up of Foreign Minister Mario Lubetkin and businesspeople from the rice sector, departed on President Orsi's first diplomatic mission in his government bound for Panama, with the interest of meeting with his counterpart President Mulino on Monday 7.

==== Canada ====
On Friday 7 March 2025, the governments of Uruguay and Canada agreed to begin negotiations for the purpose of modernizing the Foreign Investment Promotion and Protection Agreement ―FIPA―, in force between the two countries since 1999. In response to the Vancouver mass ramming of 26 April 2025, the Uruguayan Foreign Ministry expressed its condolences in a statement.

==== Mexico ====
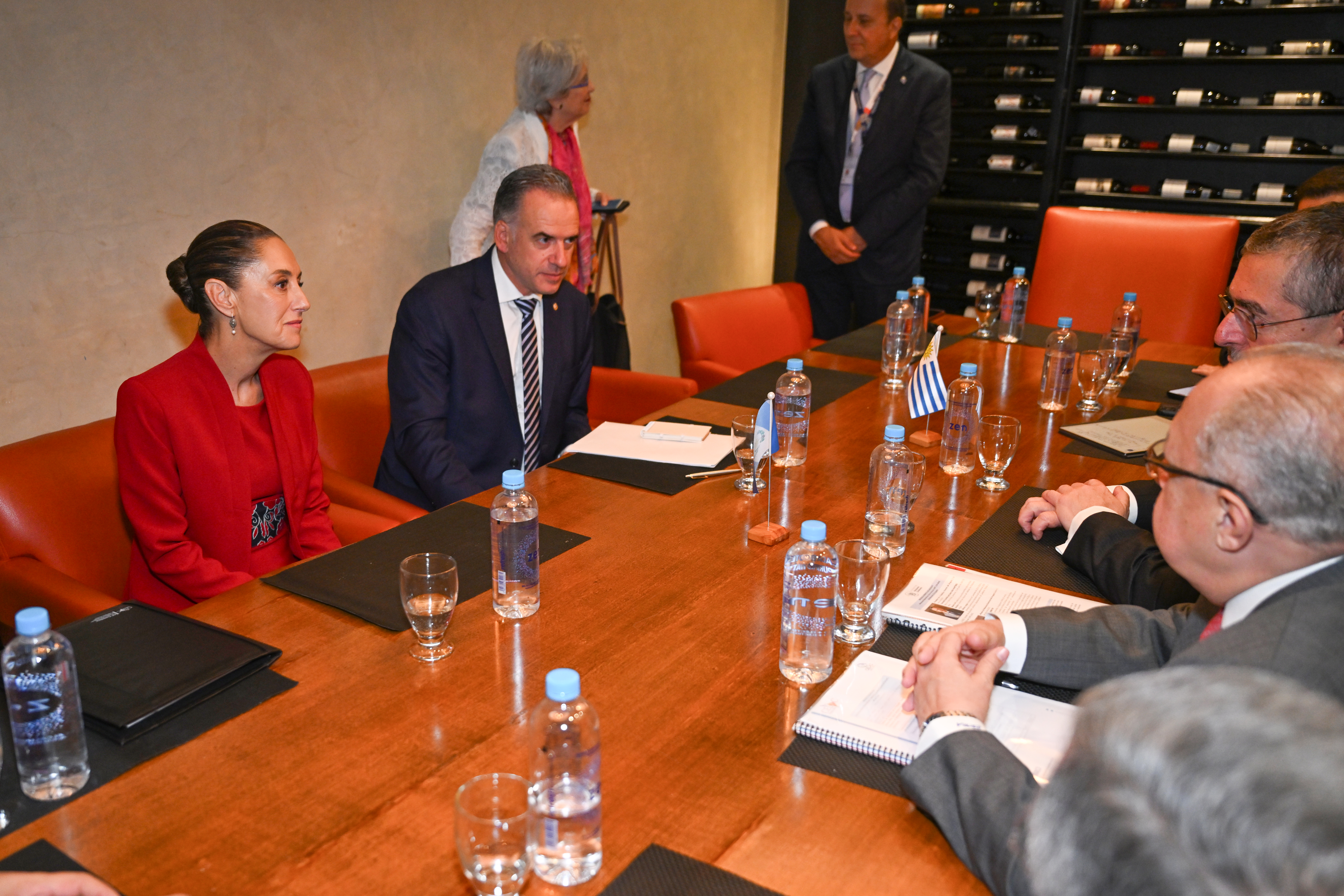
Meeting between Yamandú Orsi, Claudia Sheinbaum and Bernardo Arévalo at the 2025 CELAC Summit.

Within the framework of the 9th CELAC Summit, held in early April 2025 in Honduras, Orsi held a bilateral meeting with Mexican president Claudia Sheinbaum, where reciprocal invitations to visit their countries were made. On Saturday 18 April 2026, within the framework of the so-called Summit in Defense of Democracy in Spain, which brought together different progressive leaders, President Orsi held a bilateral meeting with Mexican president Sheinbaum.

==== United States ====
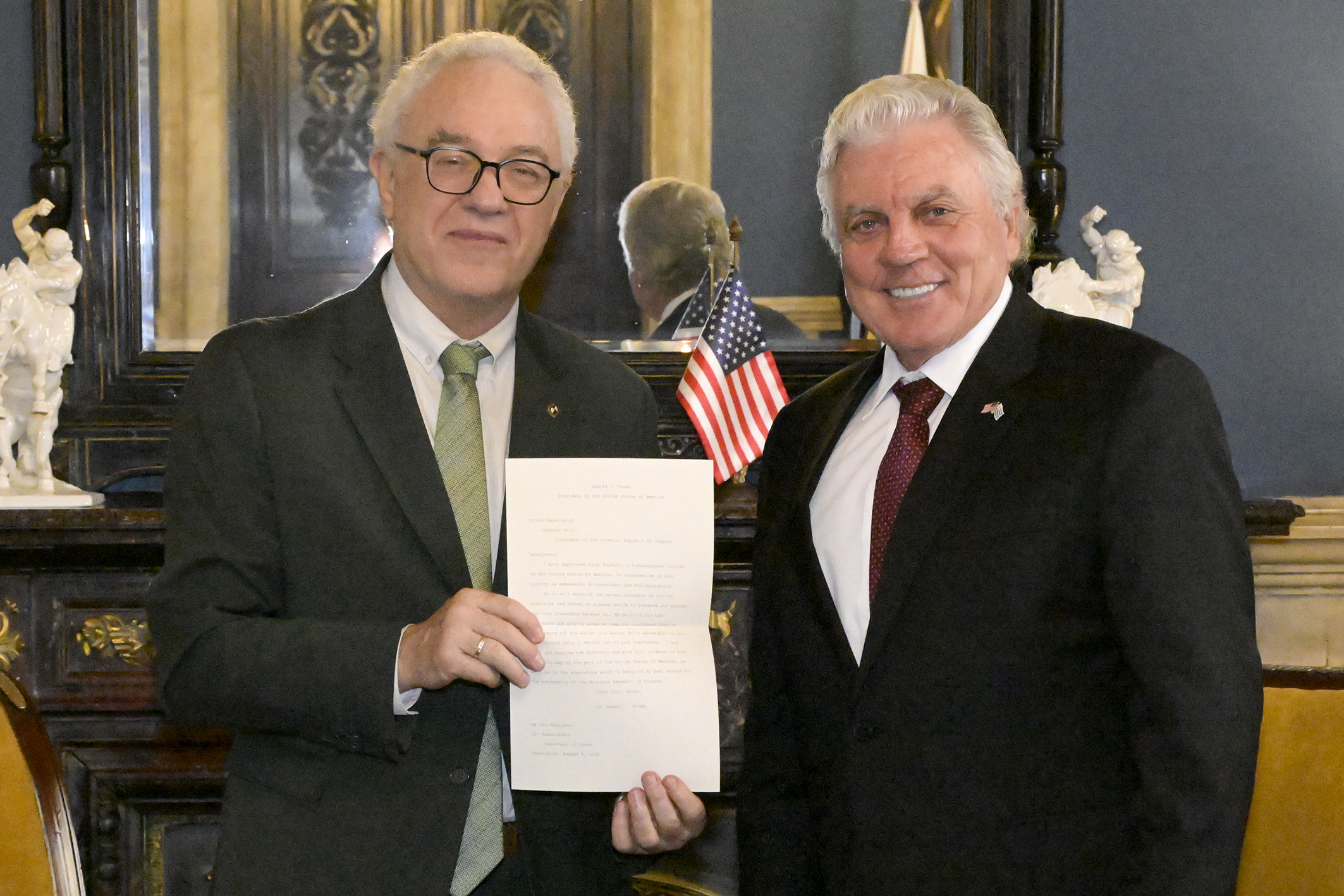
Ambassador Lou Rinaldi presents figured letters to Foreign Minister Mario Lubetkin.

On 2 April 2025, called Liberation Day by President Donald Trump, a base tariff on all its trading partners of 10%, including Uruguay, was announced, scheduled to come into force on 5 April. The United States in 2024 was the third destination country for Uruguayan exports, with beef being the most placed product. In response to the announcement of new tariffs, the Uruguayan government began to think of a work plan in response to the new circumstances and was urged to maintain contact with White House representatives. On 27 June 2025, U.S. ambassador Heide B. Fulton announced the end of her mission in Uruguay. On Thursday 31 July, the president of the United States, Donald Trump, signed a decree where he ratified the 10% tariffs for Uruguay, which would begin to apply from Thursday 7 August. On Monday 4 August, the United States Senate announced Lou Rinaldi as the new ambassador to Uruguay. That same day, the embassy of the North American country announced that a new requirement had been added, and would begin to apply from 2 September, for non-immigrant visa applicants in most categories: an in-person interview with a consular officer.

On Wednesday 3 September, the United States embassy in Uruguay reported that U.S. and Uruguayan marines "carried out an exchange focused on operations with rigid-hulled inflatable boats, signaling procedures and training sessions", which days later provoked reactions from the opposition over the entry of foreign military contingents into national territory without parliamentary approval. On Sunday 21 September, President Yamandú Orsi travelled to the United States, scheduled to take part in various activities such as his participation in the opening of the General Debate of the 80th session of the United Nations General Assembly. Within that framework, it was announced that the Adam Smith Center, of Florida International University, would begin to promote debate and training instances in Uruguay.

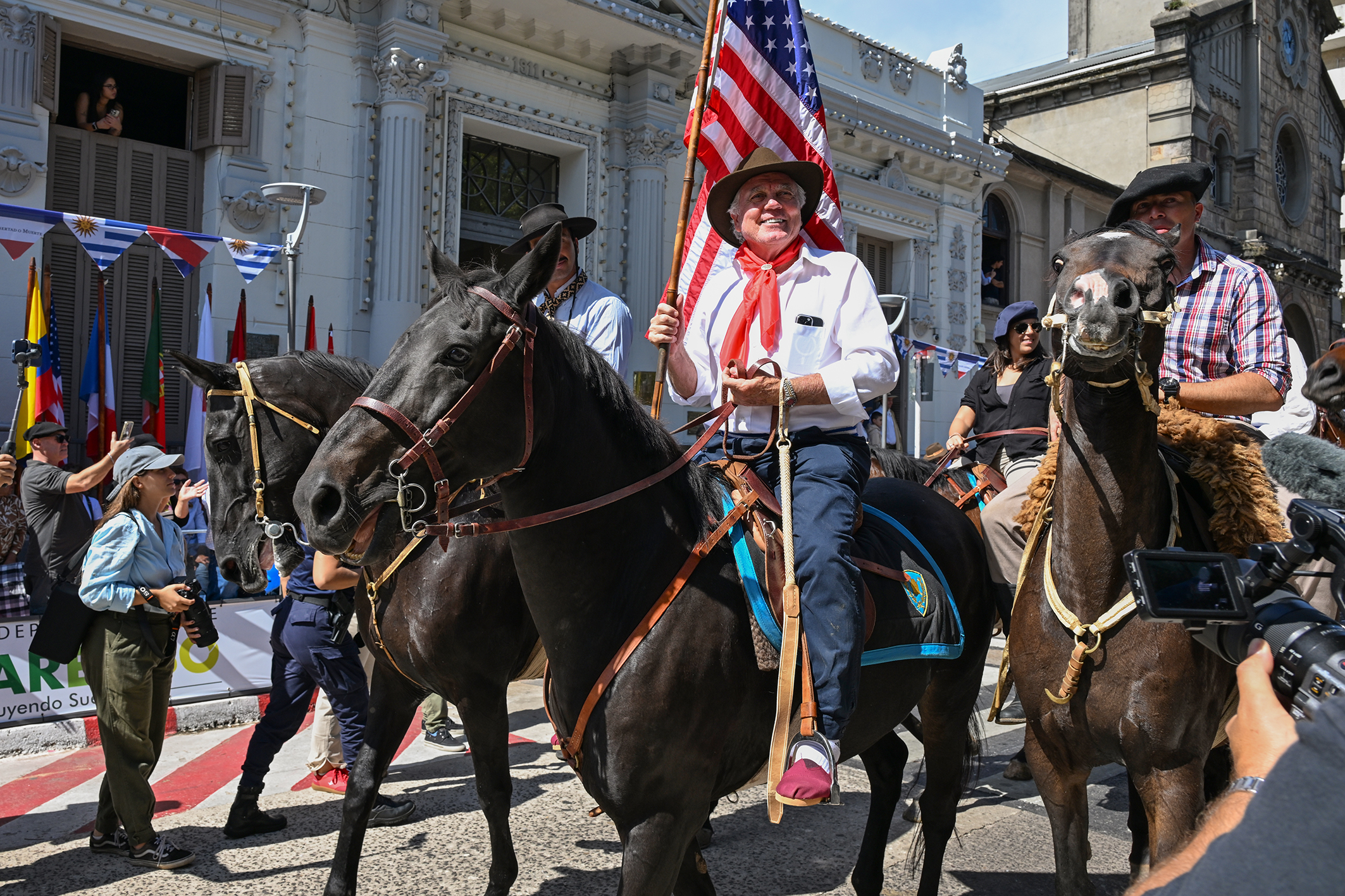
The United States ambassador, Lou Rinaldi, took part in the parade of the 39th Fiesta de la Patria Gaucha on 14 March 2026.

On Wednesday 14 January 2026, the United States Department of State announced the pause of immigrant visa processing for citizens of 75 countries, including Uruguay, to begin to apply from 21 January for an indefinite duration. On Thursday 15 January, President Orsi met with U.S. ambassador Lou Rinaldi at the Suárez y Reyes official residence, where various issues such as visas were raised. On Thursday 22 January, news media reported how the United States offered the Ministry of Defense a Reliance-class patrol boat, available since late 2022 to be transferred to Uruguay. On Thursday 12 February, President Orsi stated that Uruguay would be "willing" to join the group of the Shield of the Americas ―an initiative promoted by the United States with the aim of coordinating actions against drug-trafficking cartels― if invited. In late March, a donation was made of a unit of fourteen Mamba Recovery MK-7 armored vehicles, donated by the U.S. government to the National Army, previously announced in July 2024 during the governments of Joe Biden and Luis Lacalle Pou.

On Saturday 2 May 2026, invited by Ambassador Lou Rinaldi, President Yamandú Orsi visited the aircraft carrier USS Nimitz, which was sailing in areas near the Uruguayan coast.

==== Americas international organizations ====
===== Community of Latin American and Caribbean States =====
Foreign Minister Mario Lubetkin and President Yamandú Orsi travelled to and remained on 8 and 9 April 2025 in Honduras to take part in the 9th CELAC Summit. At that summit, Brazil gave political support for Uruguay to hold the pro tempore presidency of CELAC from 2026, which was voted on at the end of the day. On 13 May, Foreign Minister Lubetkin represented Uruguay at the 4th China-CELAC Forum. On Saturday 21 February 2026, the 10th Summit of Heads of State of CELAC was held in Colombia, where the host country handed the organization's pro tempore presidency to Uruguay.

===== Brasília Consensus =====
On Tuesday 19 August 2025, President Yamandú Orsi received his Ecuadorian counterpart Daniel Noboa in Uruguay and Uruguay received from Ecuador the pro tempore presidency of the Brasília Consensus. On Tuesday 9 September, the formal assumption ceremony was held and Montevideo hosted the mechanism's first in-person meeting since its creation in 2023.

===== MERCOSUR =====
During the transition period between the government of Luis Lacalle Pou and that of Yamandú Orsi, the MERCOSUR Summit began on 6 December 2024, held in Montevideo, where the final text of the free trade treaty between MERCOSUR and the European Union was closed after almost 25 years of negotiations. On Saturday 1 March 2025, the first day of Yamandú Orsi's government, legislative sessions opened in Argentina. Before the Argentine Congress, President Javier Milei stated that he would seek a trade agreement with the United States of Donald Trump, even if this meant "leaving MERCOSUR", which he also accused of having "only succeeded in enriching large Brazilian businesspeople at the cost of impoverishing Argentines". The following day, at the Estévez Palace in Montevideo, President Yamandú Orsi and his German counterpart Frank-Walter Steinmeier highlighted the importance of the agreement between MERCOSUR and the European Union.

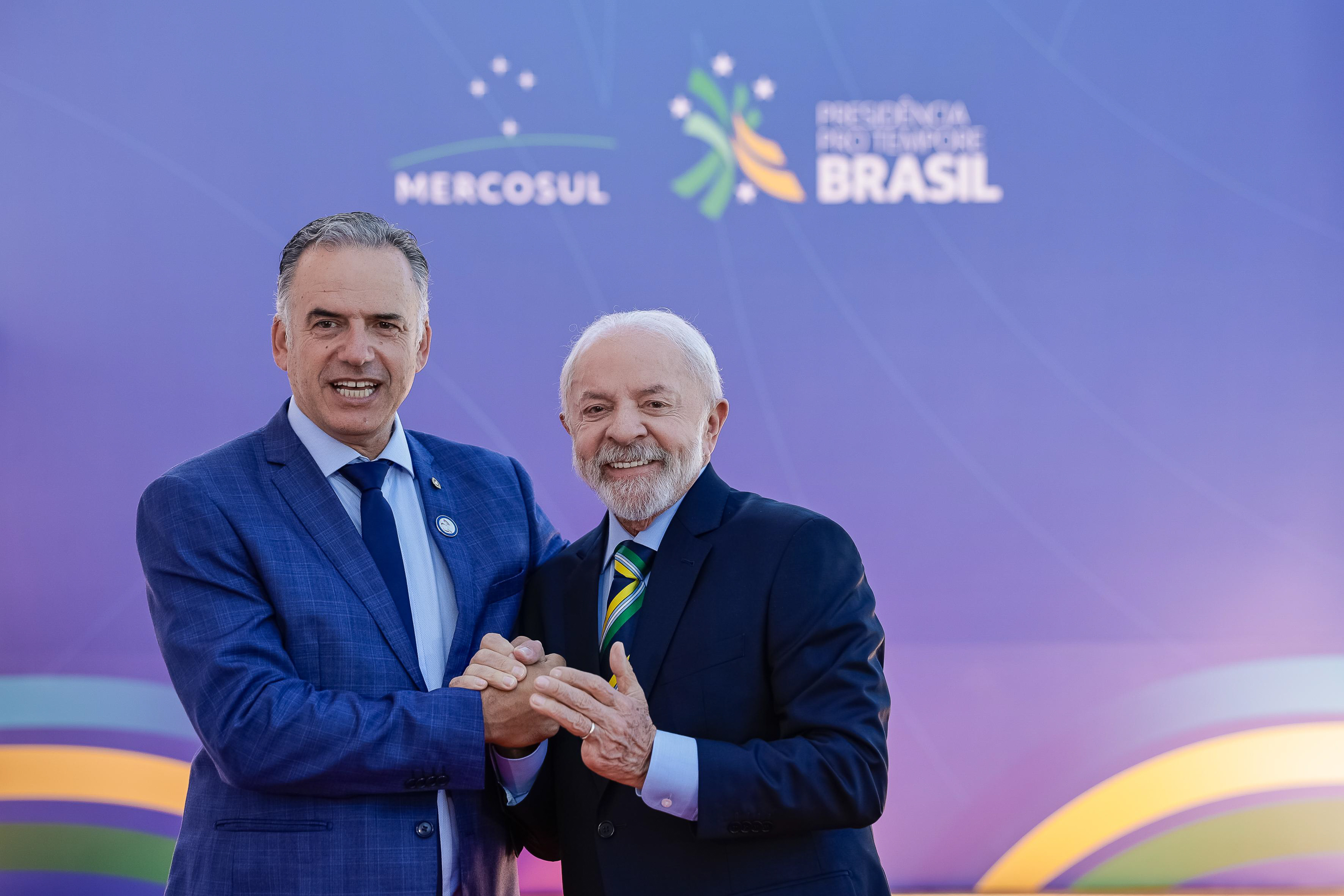
Yamandú Orsi and Lula da Silva at the 67th Summit of MERCOSUR Presidents.

On Wednesday 2 July, Yamandú Orsi travelled to Argentina to take part the following day in the 66th Summit of Mercosur presidents, held in Buenos Aires, and that same day negotiations for a free trade treaty with EFTA were concluded. The following day, the Uruguayan president took part in the Summit and defended the "deepening" of the bloc. On Friday 19 December, President Orsi travelled to the Brazilian city of Foz do Iguaçu to take part in the 67th Summit of MERCOSUR Presidents, in the context of the European Commission's decision to postpone until January a possible signing of the agreement between the European Union and the regional bloc, which had been scheduled for that Saturday. At the Foz do Iguaçu Summit, Uruguay and Brazil were the only countries that did not sign a document for the democratic restoration of Venezuela that had as points: the demand for institutionality, a transparent electoral timetable, the release of political prisoners, attention to the humanitarian crisis, and commitment to the Inter-American Democratic Charter; Uruguay argued this under the premise of not deepening Caracas's isolation, which in practice left Uruguay aligned with Brazil.

===== Organization of American States =====
On Tuesday 4 March 2025, Uruguay aligned itself with Brazil, Colombia, Chile and Bolivia in support of the candidacy of the foreign minister of Suriname, Albert Ramdin, to lead the Organization of American States ―OAS―. Uruguay's decision to support this candidate meant a rupture with the Lacalle Pou government's intention to vote for the foreign minister of Paraguay, Rubén Ramírez Lezcano. It also broke with the stance previously adopted by Yamandú Orsi, who told Paraguayan president Santiago Peña of his willingness to maintain that support during the MERCOSUR summit in December 2024. Later, Foreign Minister Lubetkin travelled to Washington, United States, where on Monday 10 March he voted in favor of Albert Ramdin, who was confirmed in his new post.

On Monday 31 March 2025, the Orsi government announced that it would promote as director general of the Inter-American Institute for Cooperation on Agriculture ―IICA―, a specialized agency belonging to the OAS, Fernando Mattos, former minister of MGAP during the Lacalle Pou government. Fernando Mattos's candidacy, representing Uruguay, was officially presented on Thursday 22 May, in an activity held in the Amphitheater of the headquarters of the Ministry of Foreign Affairs, in Montevideo.

=== Asia and Oceania ===
==== Saudi Arabia ====
Foreign Minister Mario Lubetkin held an official mission to Saudi Arabia between 29 and 1 November, where he held a meeting with his counterpart from the Asian country, Prince Faisal bin Farhan bin Abdullah bin, and the Minister of State for Foreign Affairs, Adel al-Jubeir, and an agreement for the promotion and protection of investments with Saudi Arabia was signed.

==== Armenia and Azerbaijan ====
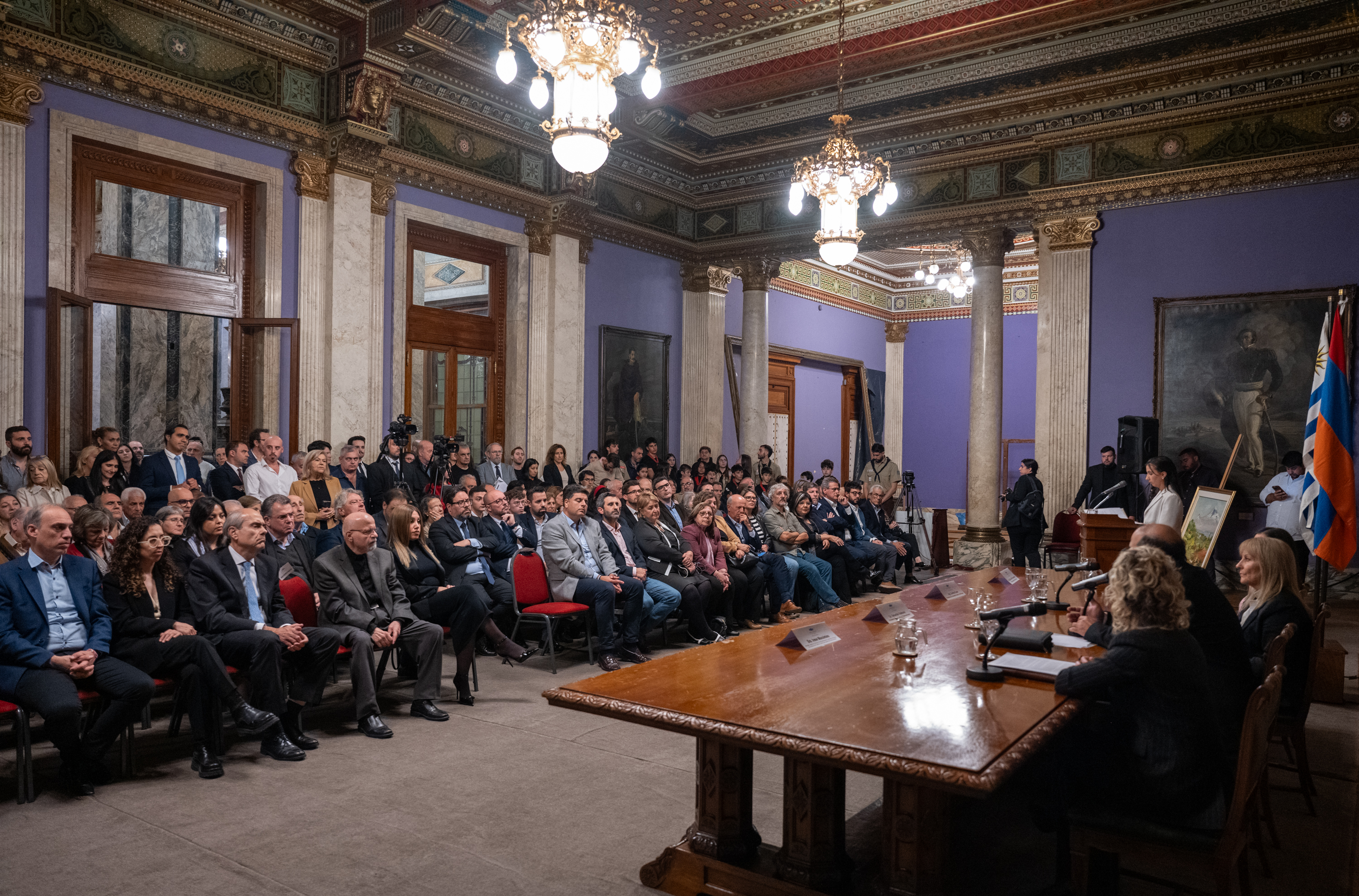
Commemorative ceremony for the anniversary of the Armenian genocide.

The president of Armenia, Vahagn Khachaturyan, attended Yamandú Orsi's inauguration as president on 1 March 2025. The following day, both presidents had a bilateral meeting at the Estévez Palace. On Wednesday 23 April 2025, President Orsi authorized the first broadcast on a national network for the Day of Remembrance of the Armenian genocide, to be held on Thursday 24 April at 18:00. This permission was granted within the framework of Law No. 20,274, enacted in March 2024, which declared an annual remembrance of the Armenian genocide every 24 April. On Monday 11 August 2025, the Uruguayan Foreign Ministry officially greeted the agreements reached between the Armenian prime minister, Nikol Pashinyan, and the president of Azerbaijan, Ilham Aliyev, in the presence of the president of the United States, Donald Trump. On Friday 5 September, Deputy Foreign Minister Valeria Csukasi met with the deputy minister of Economy of Azerbaijan, Elnur Aliyev, accompanied by a delegation that included the Export and Investment Promotion Agency of Azerbaijan.

On Monday 20 April 2026, President Orsi attended a ceremony commemorating the 111th anniversary of the Armenian genocide.

==== Australia and New Zealand ====
Between 18 and 19 August 2025, Deputy Foreign Minister Valeria Csukasi travelled to Vietnam as part of a first stage of Uruguay's rapprochement with Asia and Oceania, to later depart for Singapore, between the 20th and the 22nd, and finally to Australia between the 24th and the 26th. On her trip to Australia, a Social Security Agreement was signed, the 200 years of Uruguay's independence were commemorated and she met with representatives of the Uruguayan community. In September 2025, the second stage of Deputy Foreign Minister Valeria Csukasi's missions to bring Uruguay closer to Asia and Oceania began, where she travelled to Indonesia between the 15th and the 16th of that month, to Malaysia between the 17th and the 20th, and to New Zealand between the 21st and the 23rd. On Sunday 14 December, the Uruguayan government condemned the attack that occurred that day in Sydney, Australia. On Tuesday 3 February 2026, Foreign Minister Mario Lubetkin met in Uruguay with the Minister of Foreign Affairs and Trade of New Zealand, Winston Peters.

==== Qatar ====
In December 2025, Secretary of the Presidency Alejandro Sánchez and Foreign Minister Mario Lubetkin travelled to Qatar for the Doha International Forum.

==== China ====
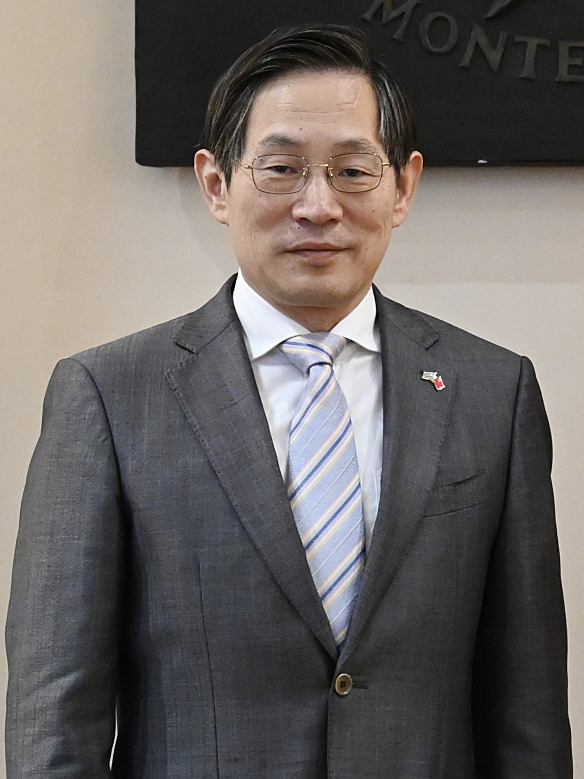
Huang Yazhong, ambassador extraordinary and plenipotentiary of the People's Republic of China to Uruguay since 2023.

During the transition period, both Yamandú Orsi and Carolina Cosse received the Chinese ambassador to Uruguay, Huang Yazhong, in their respective offices. On the morning of Sunday 2 March 2025, President Orsi together with several ministers received at the Estévez Palace the Minister of Agriculture and Rural Affairs of the People's Republic of China, Han Jun. On Friday 9 May, with the presence of Foreign Minister Lubetkin, Uruguay installed a consulate in Hong Kong, also with jurisdiction in Macau. According to analysts, Uruguay's policy toward China under the government of Yamandú Orsi is to continue consolidating strategic relations with the Asian country but changing the original idea of a Free Trade Agreement, sought during the Lacalle Pou government, to the search for sectorized micro-agreements. Shortly afterward, Foreign Minister Lubetkin met with his Chinese counterpart, Wang Yi, and on 13 May participated as Uruguay's representative in the 4th China-CELAC Forum in Beijing, where President Orsi sent a recorded speech.

On 15 May, China announced that it would allow citizens of several South American countries, including Uruguay, to enter its country without a visa, from 1 June 2025 to 31 May 2026. In late May, the Minister of Livestock, Agriculture and Fisheries, Alfredo Fratti, headed a Uruguayan delegation in China together with representatives of the National Meat Institute ―INAC― and the National Institute of Agricultural Research ―INIA―; which, among other activities, allowed the export of new commodities to the Asian country to be authorized. Within the framework of the 17th BRICS Summit, held in Brazil, on Monday 7 July 2025 President Yamandú Orsi held a meeting with the president of the Asian Infrastructure Investment Bank —AIIB—, Jin Liqun. In mid-September, Minister Fratti referred at Expo Prado to the signing of bovine gallstones.

Between 3 and 5 November 2025, Ding Xuexiang, the vice premier of China and one of the seven members of the Politburo Standing Committee of the Chinese Communist Party, made an official visit to Uruguay, before participating on 6 November in the COP30 climate summit in the Brazilian city of Belém. On Tuesday 4 November, Ding Xuexiang met with President Yamandú Orsi at the Suárez residence and then with Vice President Carolina Cosse in Parliament. On Tuesday 25 November, AIIB president Jin Liqun met with Foreign Minister Lubetkin at the Foreign Ministry building. On Wednesday 31 December 2025, the last day of 2025, China announced that from 1 January 2026 it would impose an additional 55% tariff on beef imports exceeding a certain amount from various countries such as Uruguay, applicable for three years until 31 December 2028. The livestock minister, Alfredo Fratti, saw the new Chinese tariff as good news because the quota will not affect Uruguay because it only applies to shipments that exceed an import quota that the country has never reached.

On Thursday 29 January 2026, President Yamandú Orsi, accompanied by a delegation, travelled to China with an agenda in the cities of Beijing and Shanghai ―the Uruguayan government had agreed with the Chinese authorities on an official visit before the first year of the administration―, where he would hold a round of meetings with high authorities of the Asian nation's government, such as Chinese president Xi Jinping and Premier Li Qiang; to return to Uruguay on 8 February. The meeting between President Orsi and President Xi Jinping took place at the Great Hall of the People, in Beijing, on Tuesday 3 February, in the commemoration of the 38th anniversary of the establishment of diplomatic relations between the two countries, where eleven agreements in various areas were signed. Likewise, at the meeting there was a joint pronouncement between both presidents to continue support for the principle of "one China" that recognizes the island of Taiwan as an "inalienable part" of Chinese territory. The following day, the Taiwanese government expressed its "firm protest and condemnation" over the content of the document signed by the two presidents.

In mid-February, after President Orsi's trip to China, an invitation received by the intendant of Durazno, Felipe Algorta, to attend the Smart City congress, to be held in Taiwan from 17 to 20 March, became public. On Thursday 19 February 2026, Foreign Minister Lubetkin appeared before the Permanent Commission of the Legislative Branch, where he gave his opinion on Algorta's invitation as: "we have stated that this is not something that is going in the right direction and that we have had a clear definition since 1988 regarding one China [...] That is a bad signal". A month later, it was confirmed that the intendant of Durazno would not visit Taiwan, and he received at the Intendancy the PRC ambassador, Huang Yazhong, on Friday 13 March.

==== India and Pakistan ====
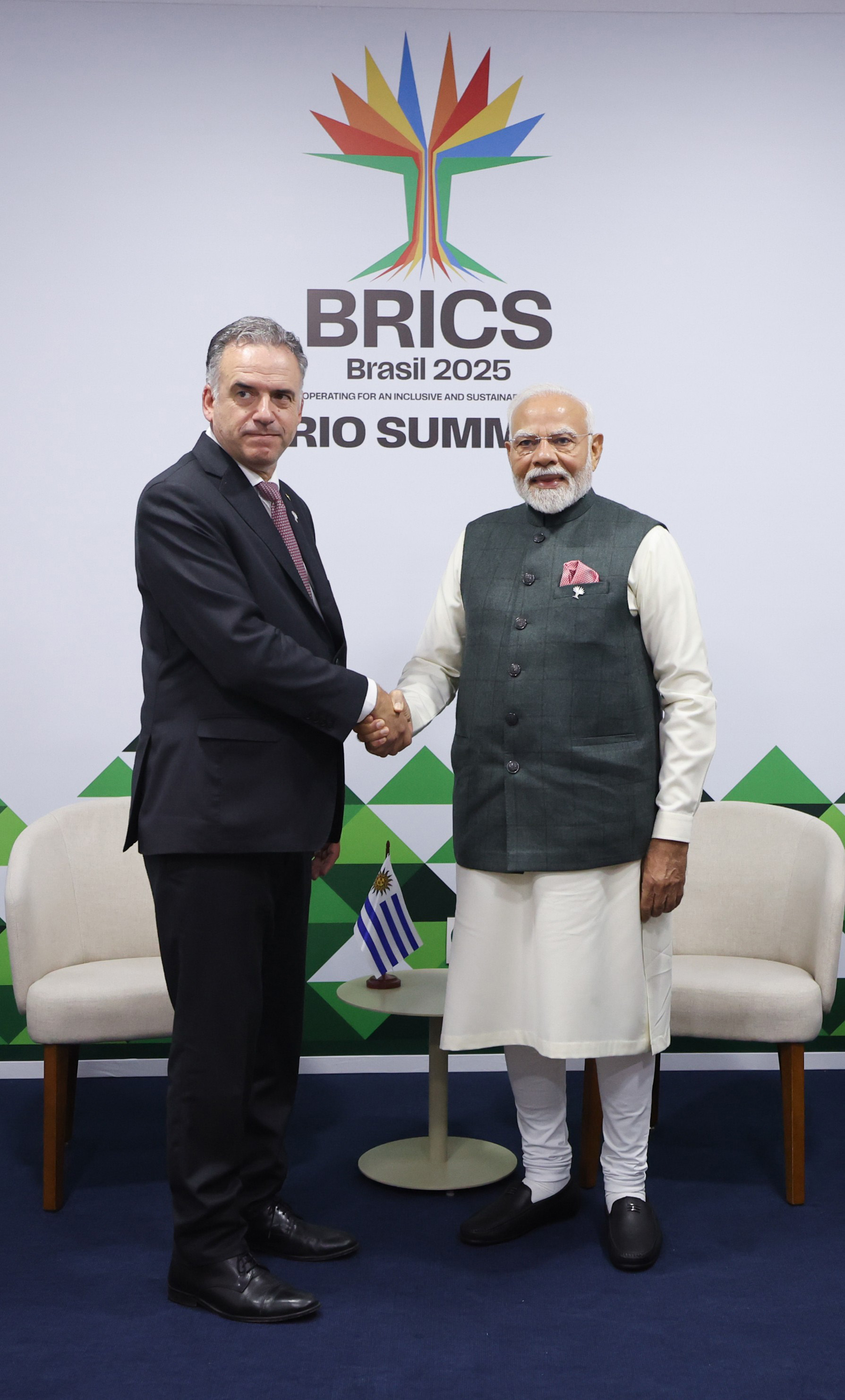
Yamandú Orsi and Narendra Modi at the 17th BRICS Summit, held in Brazil in early July 2025.

On 23 April, the Uruguayan Foreign Ministry condemned the attack that had occurred the previous day in the city of Pahalgam, in the Jammu and Kashmir region of India, which worsened relations between this country and its neighbor Pakistan. On Thursday 12 June, the Foreign Ministry issued a statement lamenting the air accident that occurred in Ahmedabad, India, that same day, in which more than two hundred people died. Within the framework of the 17th BRICS Summit, held in Brazil, on Monday 7 July 2025 President Yamandú Orsi held a bilateral meeting with the prime minister of India, Narendra Modi. After this meeting, Foreign Minister Mario Lubetkin announced to the press that India planned to open an embassy in Uruguay. On Wednesday 21 January 2026, Undersecretary Valeria Csukasi met with the ambassador of the Republic of India, concurrent from Buenos Aires, Ajaneesh Kumar.

==== Iran ====
On Friday 13 June 2025, the Foreign Ministry issued a statement of concern over the military escalation between Israel and Iran that day, which it described as aggravating an "already extremely delicate regional situation in the Middle East". On Tuesday 17 June, the Uruguayan Foreign Ministry began preparations to evacuate its diplomatic staff in Tehran amid the military escalation. On Sunday 22 June, the Foreign Ministry issued a statement expressing its deep concern over the attack on nuclear facilities in Iran and its potential consequences.

On Saturday 28 February 2026, the Foreign Ministry expressed through a statement its concern over the military attacks against Iran by the United States and Israel, as well as the Iranian military response in territories of its neighboring countries. On Monday 2 March, the Uruguayan government communicated through a statement its monitoring of the situation in the Middle East and expressed its deep concern over the widening escalation of violence.

In the context of the Iran war, after multiple diplomatic frictions, on Tuesday 31 March the Argentine government declared the Iranian Revolutionary Guard a terrorist organization and accused its leader, Ahmad Vahidi, of taking part in the organization of the AMIA attack in 1994. The following day, Wednesday 1 April, Iran published its response through its embassy in Uruguay, whose jurisdiction also includes Paraguay, where it stated that it "strongly condemns the illegal and unjustified action of the Argentine government" and maintained that it was "an unforgivable offense to the Iranian people". That same day, the Argentine government ordered the expulsion of the main Iranian diplomatic official in Buenos Aires, Mohsen Soltani Tehrani. Figures from the Uruguayan political opposition, such as National Party senator Javier García and former foreign minister Omar Paganini, criticized the Iranian statement for the use of the embassy in Uruguay, not concurrent in Argentina, to issue these critical statements.

==== Israel and Palestine ====
During the transition period between the government of Luis Lacalle Pou and that of Yamandú Orsi, on 3 January 2025 some Broad Front deputies expressed support for the statement issued by various social organizations ―such as the PIT-CNT and the FEUU― that urged the closure of the Uruguayan innovation office in Jerusalem, which had been inaugurated in December 2024 after an agreement signed between the Hebrew University of Jerusalem and the National Research and Innovation Agency (ANII).

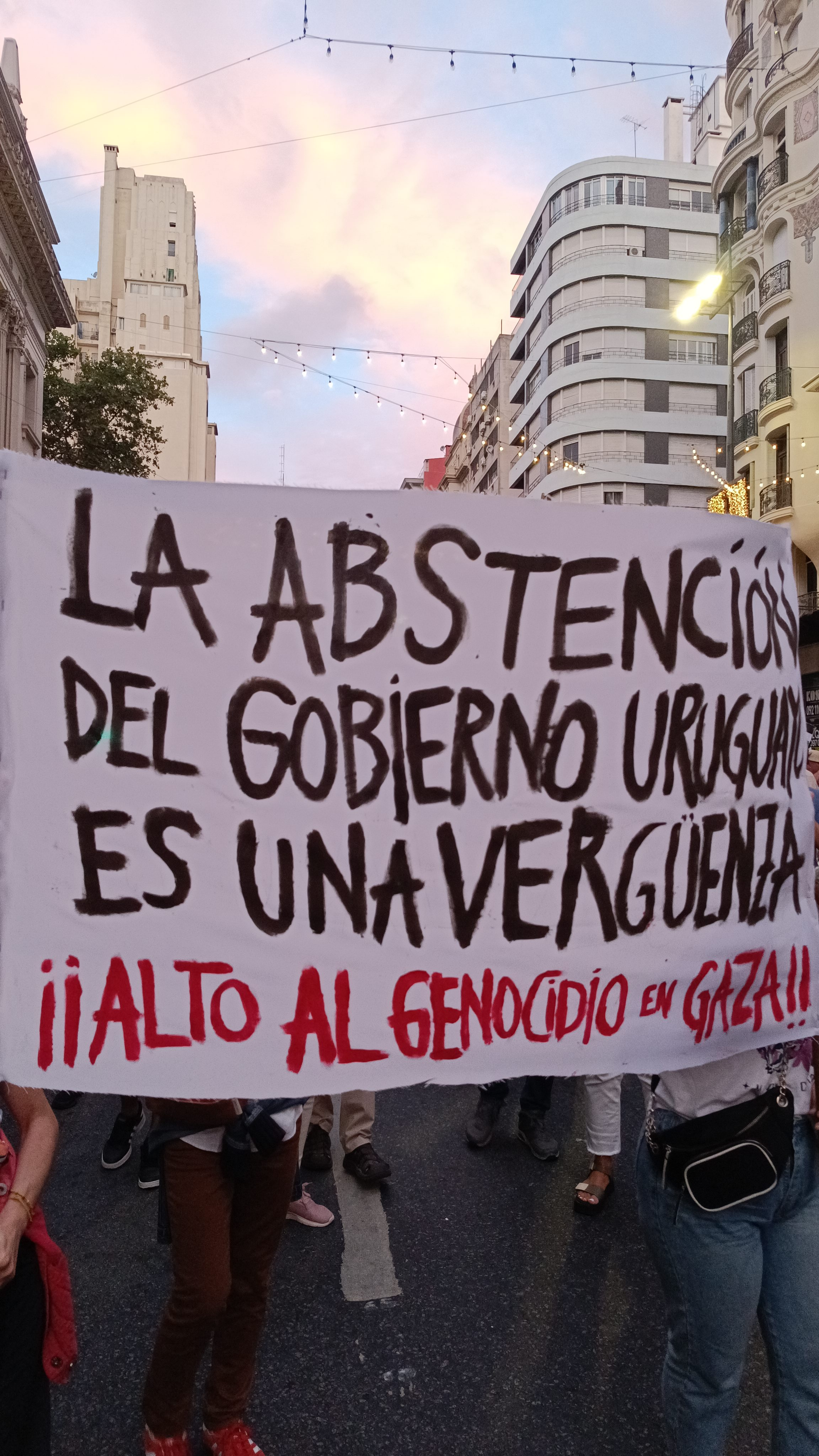
Banner of a "March for Palestine" in Montevideo on 29 February 2024.

After the government took office, on Monday 31 March 2025, the Uruguayan Foreign Ministry expressed its concern over the report provided on the previous 28 March by the United Nations Office for the Coordination of Humanitarian Affairs ―OCHA― to the Security Council, in which it noted the violation of "legal norms and humanitarian principles" in Gaza after several weeks without the entry of humanitarian aid. Likewise, in that statement the Foreign Ministry urged the parties to "immediately restore the ceasefire" and the "immediate release of all hostages", and reiterated the Uruguayan State's historical position of "defense of the two-State solution". However, that same day the Executive Secretariat of the Broad Front issued a statement in which it distanced itself from its government, accusing Israel as "responsible for the extreme seriousness of the situation" and stated that it would evaluate the "suspension of the Innovation Office in the city of Jerusalem".

On Thursday 3 April, Foreign Minister Mario Lubetkin appeared before the International Affairs Committee in Parliament to present "foreign policy guidelines", and there ratified that the government would keep the ANII office in Israel. On Tuesday 8 April, the Central Board of Directors of the University of the Republic ―UdelaR― voted unanimously for the closure of the ANII office in Jerusalem, and that "in the event that the government does not grant UdelaR's request, it would not participate in any project linked to it".

On 19 May, the Foreign Ministry issued a statement urging the authorities of Israel to guarantee safe and unrestricted access of humanitarian aid for the population of Gaza through the United Nations, and called for the unconditional release of the hostages, the resumption of the ceasefire in Gaza and the avoidance of the displacement of local populations. On 21 May, a delegation of 21 diplomats from different countries, including the Uruguayan ambassador in Palestine, Fernando Arroyo, was attacked by the Israeli Army while it was making a visit organized by the Palestinian Ministry of Foreign Affairs in the town of Jenin. After the attack, in which there were no injuries, the Israeli Army accused the diplomatic delegation of "deviating from the approved route", so the soldiers fired "warning shots" to distance them. Foreign Minister Lubetkin regretted the incident and told the media that he had summoned the Israeli ambassador to the Foreign Ministry to explain the incident.

In late May, in an interview given to the outlet La Diaria, Foreign Minister Lubetkin reaffirmed the Uruguayan position: "we never again want what happened on 7 October 2023 and we want this situation of massacre in Gaza to end". President Orsi spoke to the press in line with the foreign minister on Wednesday 28 May. The following day, the Israeli ambassador held a meeting with Defense Minister Sandra Lazo to discuss issues of bilateral cooperation and joint collaboration on security and defense. And on Friday 30 May, the Broad Front legislative caucus sent a draft declaration to the Senate calling for the cessation of bombings in the Gaza Strip and for the entry of humanitarian aid into the territory.

In early June, there were five Broad Front sectors ―Communist Party, Socialist Party, Party for the Victory of the People, Artiguist Axis and Seregnistas― that had asked the government to harden its stance toward Israel's offensive in Gaza. On Tuesday 3 June, Foreign Minister Lubetkin met with Mohammed Shafei, the chargé d'affaires of the Embassy of Palestine in Uruguay, to whom he expressed the solidarity of the Uruguayan government over the humanitarian crisis in Gaza. On Wednesday 4 June, the Broad Front issued a statement in which it made a "call to the militancy and the people in general to promote and call actions in defense of the human rights of the Palestinian people [...] and to condemn the crimes against humanity and genocide that the government of Israel is committing against Palestine". Both the Colorado Party and B'nai B'rith responded with statements rejecting the Broad Front's statement. The following day, President Orsi distanced himself from the statement, saying: "it is the declaration of a political force, the government is something else"; and assured that the Uruguayan government has plans to assist the population affected by the conflict, such as the provision of basic foods such as powdered milk and rice. Meanwhile the secretary of the presidency, Alejandro Sánchez, stated that he "shares" the declaration of the Broad Front Executive Secretariat, but that Uruguay should also continue to uphold the historical defense of the "Two-State Solution", and confirmed talks between government authorities to assist Gaza with food.

On Friday 6 June, Foreign Minister Lubetkin highlighted the possibility of integrating young Palestinians from the West Bank into a sustainable agricultural training program through the FAO. On Saturday 7, the MPP published a declaration and resolution from its national leadership on the occasion of the first 100 days of Yamandú Orsi's government, in which, among other topics, it described the actions of the Israeli government in Palestinian territory as "planned genocide". On Wednesday 11 June, Foreign Minister Lubetkin indicated that there would be four or five Palestinians, agricultural engineers, who would arrive in Uruguay within the framework of an FAO program.

On Friday 13 June, the Foreign Ministry issued a statement of concern over the military escalation between Israel and Iran that day, which it described as aggravating an "already extremely delicate regional situation in the Middle East". This military escalation between Israel and Iran caused the closure of airspace throughout Israeli territory, making it impossible for elected intendants Carlos Albisu and Nicolás Olivera, of Salto and Paysandú respectively, who were in Israel together with other local government leaders from Latin America within the framework of Muni Gira Israel 2025, organized by the Israeli Agency for International Development Cooperation and the International Institute of Leadership, to leave the country. On Tuesday 17 June, both elected intendants left Israel, via Jordan and then to return to Uruguay, thanks to an operation by the Israeli government. That same day, a march in favor of Palestine was held in front of the Executive Tower. In the early hours of Thursday 19 June, their flight arrived in Buenos Aires from São Paulo, since the flight was diverted and could not land in Montevideo. From Buenos Aires they took a taxi to Gualeguaychú and from there crossed the bridge to Fray Bentos, arriving in Uruguay. On Saturday 28 June, the Foreign Ministry issued a new statement on the worsening of the humanitarian crisis in the Gaza Strip.

Uruguay sent a delegation to take part in the first summit of The Hague Group, held in Bogotá between 15 and 16 July; the first instance of the group formed the previous 31 January to coordinate coordinate concrete actions, including "legal and diplomatic measures", against Israel's offensive in the Gaza Strip. At the end of the month, on Thursday 24 July, the Foreign Ministry issued an "urgent call" statement over the deterioration of the humanitarian crisis in the Gaza Strip and the increase in Human Rights violations, "not only in that territory but also encompassing the West Bank, an area over which the Israeli Parliament yesterday approved a motion calling for its annexation to Israel". Likewise, the statement affirmed that the Uruguayan State "rejects any action that promotes territorial or demographic changes in the Occupied Palestinian Territories and reaffirms its support for the two-State solution, with two States living together in peace, according to the 1967 borders". The following day, Uruguayan Vice President Carolina Cosse stated through the social network X that previous statements of hers, regarding her position on the war taking place in Gaza, were distorted as a "malicious" dissemination, and insisted that "the war must end". In late July, Uruguay's permanent representative to the UN, Laura Dupuy, took part in a United Nations conference on the two-State solution for Israel and Palestine.

On Friday 8 August, the Foreign Ministry issued a statement condemning the approval, issued that same day, by Israel's Security Cabinet to occupy Gaza City. On Tuesday 12 August, President Orsi received, at the Executive Tower, Reem Al-Hajajreh, Palestinian, representative of the group Women of the Sun; Hyam Tannous, Israeli, Arab, Christian, from the steering committee of Women Wage Peace, and Angela Scharf, Israeli, Jewish, coordinator of the foreign relations team of Women Wage Peace. On Friday 15 August, in response to the worsening of the situation in the Middle East that month, the Uruguayan government decided to freeze the agreement between ANII and the Hebrew University of Jerusalem. On Tuesday 9 September, the Foreign Ministry issued a statement condemning the attacks perpetrated by Israel in the city of Doha, Qatar, that same day. On Friday 12 September, Uruguay was one of the 142 votes in favor, against 10 against and 12 abstentions, in the United Nations General Assembly to approve a resolution endorsing the New York Declaration on the Peaceful Settlement of the Question of Palestine and the Implementation of the Two-State Solution.

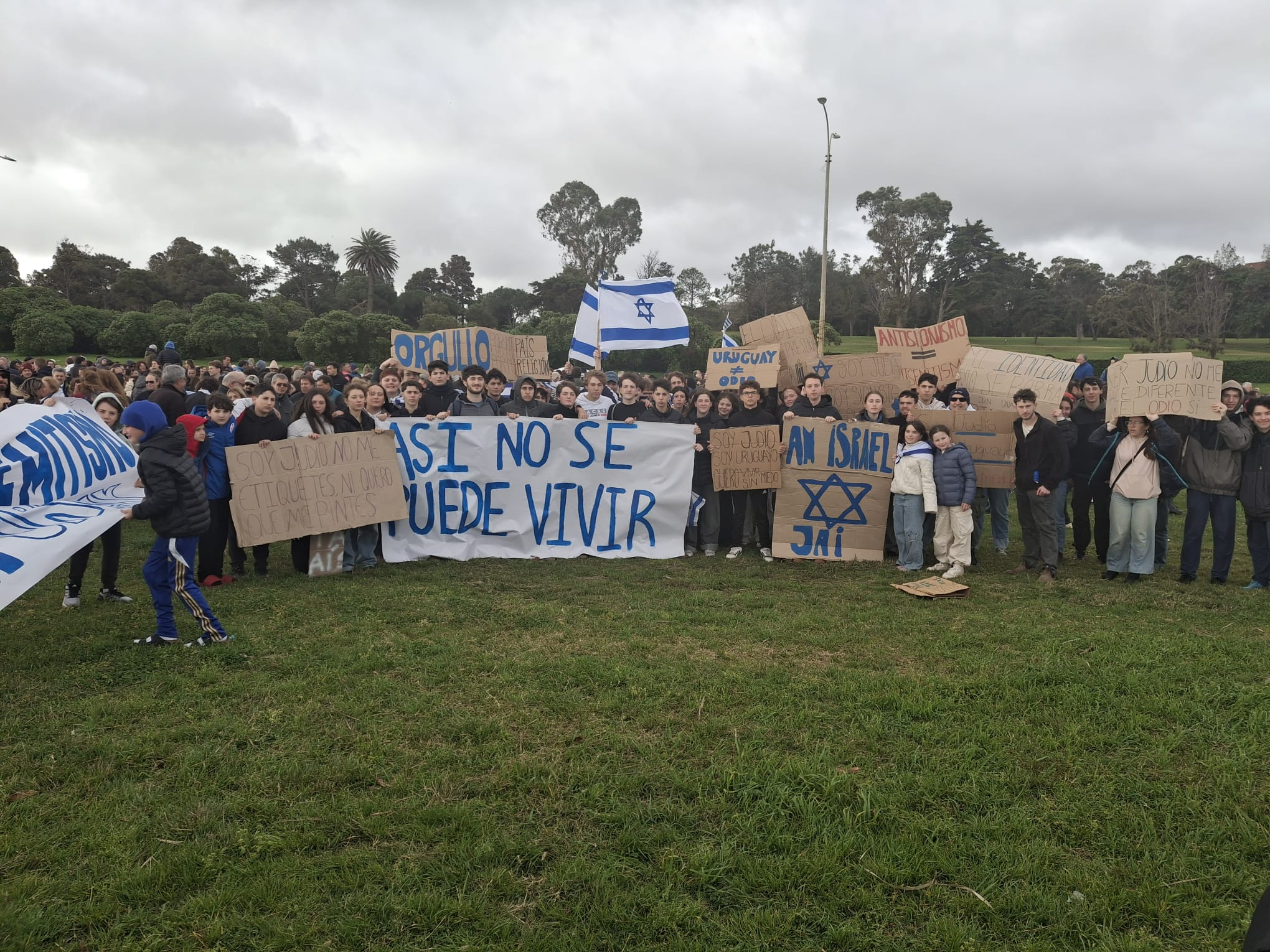

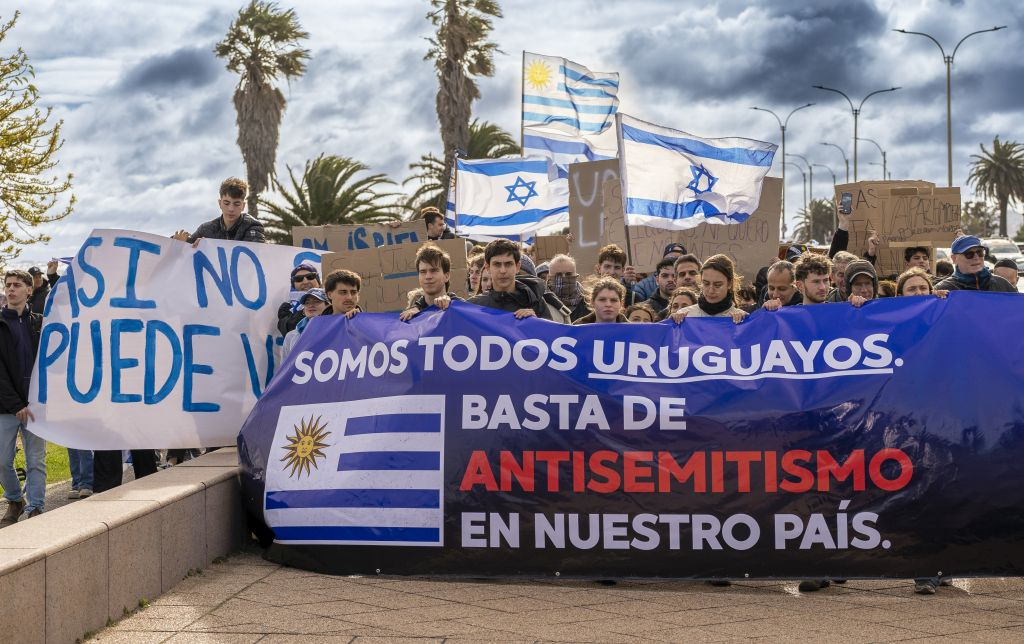
March against antisemitism on the Rambla of Montevideo (21/9/2025).

On Tuesday 16 September, the Independent International Commission of Inquiry on the occupied Palestinian territories, which was established by the UN Human Rights Council, stated that Israel is committing genocide against Palestinians in the Gaza Strip. On Thursday 18 September, the Broad Front parliamentary caucuses condemned in a report the actions of the government of Benjamin Netanyahu and highlighted the "acts constituting genocide", taking as reference the statements of the Independent International Commission a few days earlier. That same Thursday, a controversial pro-Palestine mobilization took place around the Escuela Integral Hebreo Uruguaya, a private school located in the Pocitos neighborhood, which generated debates among public figures. The following day, an interview by the outlet La Diaria with Secretary of the Presidency Alejandro Sánchez was published, where the official also described the events in Gaza as genocide.

On Tuesday 23 September, President Orsi gave his first speech as head of state at the UN General Assembly, where he mentioned the situation in Gaza and Uruguay's support for the two-State solution. On Wednesday 24, a group of Jews residing in Uruguay, led by activist Mónica Wodzislawski, published a letter with 350 signatures demanding the immediate rupture of diplomatic and commercial relations with Israel. On Friday 26 September, Uruguay was one of the countries that remained in the hall when Israeli prime minister Benjamin Netanyahu gave his speech at the United Nations General Assembly.

On Wednesday 1 October, at least three Uruguayans were travelling in a fleet of more than 40 boats that was trying to reach the Gaza Strip with humanitarian aid but was detained by the Israeli Navy. That same day, the Foreign Ministry expressed "its serious concern" over the interception of the flotilla and urged the Israeli Government to respect the physical integrity and safety of the members of this initiative. The following day, Foreign Minister Mario Lubetkin met with relatives of the three Uruguayans who were detained in the flotilla. On Monday 6 October, the Broad Front resolved to join the March for Palestine on Thursday 9 October. On Tuesday 7 October, the Foreign Ministry reported that the Uruguayan citizens detained by the navy of the State of Israel were on their way to their places of residence and in good health.

The March for Palestine on Thursday 9 October was attended by Vice President Carolina Cosse, who described the events in Gaza as genocide. Later, on Thursday 16 October, Vice President Cosse attended a tribute to the victims of the attacks of 7 October 2023 in Israel organized by the Embassy of Israel and the Central Jewish Committee of Uruguay. That same day, from Rome, President Yamandú Orsi assured that Uruguay is willing to collaborate in the Gaza Strip. On Thursday 27 November, fifteen Uruguayan legislators, eight Colorados and seven Nationalists, travelled to Israel after responding affirmatively to an invitation to visit the country for a week, which was sent to them by that country's embassy in Uruguay and which the governing caucus did not accept.

==== Japan ====
Uruguay took part with its own national pavilion in Osaka World Expo 2025, held from 13 April to 13 October 2025 on the artificial island of Yumeshima, in Osaka Bay. In July 2025, Japan joined other countries, such as Germany and France, in alerts over the new Uruguayan passports issued since April of that year. Its authorities reported that "it is highly likely that they will be denied entry into the country", although entry for a maximum period of 90 days, where a visa is not necessary, if the trip is for tourism, visiting relatives, business meetings, among others, was not modified. Between 1 and 4 October, Deputy Foreign Minister Valeria Csukasi travelled to Japan as part of the third phase of the missions to bring Uruguay closer to Asia and Oceania.

==== Southeast Asia ====
Within the framework of the 17th BRICS Summit, held in Brazil, on Monday 7 July 2025 President Yamandú Orsi held a bilateral meeting with the prime minister of Vietnam, Phạm Minh Chính. On Wednesday 9 July 2025, Foreign Minister Mario Lubetkin arrived in Kuala Lumpur, the capital of Malaysia, and participated in the 58th Meeting of Foreign Ministers of the ASEAN, within the framework of which he signed the instrument of Uruguay's accession to the Treaty of Amity and Cooperation in Southeast Asia —TAC—.

Between 18 and 19 August 2025, Deputy Foreign Minister Valeria Csukasi travelled to Vietnam as part of a first stage of Uruguay's rapprochement with Asia and Oceania, to later depart for Singapore, between the 20th and the 22nd, and finally to Australia between the 24th and the 26th. In September 2025, the second stage of Deputy Foreign Minister Valeria Csukasi's missions to bring Uruguay closer to Asia and Oceania began, where she travelled to Indonesia between the 15th and the 16th of that month, to Malaysia between the 17th and the 20th, and to New Zealand between the 21st and the 23rd.

In late October and early November, Deputy Foreign Minister Csukasi began her fourth stage of bringing Uruguay closer to Asia, travelling to China for the China-LAC Business Summit and the China International Import Expo —CIIE—, and to the Philippines. In early November, Vietnam donated to the Intendancy of Montevideo a bust of Vietnamese leader Ho Chi Minh, and its possible installation sparked controversy between the governing party and the opposition. In late December, Undersecretary Csukasi said that the non-installation of the bust of the Vietnamese leader was negative for Uruguay.

On Saturday 17 January 2026, Undersecretary of Foreign Affairs Valeria Csukasi, representing Uruguay, deposited the Instrument of Ratification of the Free Trade Agreement between MERCOSUR and Singapore, after its process of incorporation into the national legal order and parliamentary ratification had concluded. On 1 March 2026, the trade agreement between Mercosur and Singapore entered into force for Uruguay.

=== Europe ===
==== Vatican City ====
In March 2025, the Foreign Ministry announced that Juan Raúl Ferreira, a member of the MPP and son of the historic National Party leader Wilson Ferreira Aldunate, would be the Uruguayan ambassador to the Holy See. On 21 April 2025, after the death of Pope Francis, the Foreign Ministry issued a statement in memory of the supreme pontiff, and the president of the Republic sent his condolences to Cardinal Giovanni Battista Re, dean of the College of Cardinals in Vatican City. Likewise, it was communicated that a delegation would be sent to take part in the pope's funeral and that day would be decreed by the president as an official day of mourning. On Wednesday 23 April, the government signed the decree declaring Saturday 26 an official day of mourning for the funeral of Pope Francis, implying that the National Flag would remain at half-mast on all public buildings and no official events would be held. On Saturday 26, Foreign Minister Lubetkin travelled to Vatican City for the funeral. On Thursday 8 May, with the election of the new pope Leo XIV, the Uruguayan government congratulated the new pontiff.

Within the framework of President Yamandú Orsi's visit to Italy, the Uruguayan president travelled briefly on Friday 17 October to Vatican City where he met personally with Pope Leo XIV, with the axes of the meeting being a visit by the supreme pontiff to Uruguay and dialogue on peace and its promotion through multilateral organizations.

==== Spain ====
The king of Spain Felipe VI visited Uruguay to attend the investiture of president-elect Yamandú Orsi on 1 March 2025, holding meetings with both the outgoing and incoming president. On Saturday 28 June 2025, President Orsi travelled to Spain to participate in the Fourth International Conference on Financing for Sustainable Development, organized by the United Nations and based in the city of Seville, where he met with both King Felipe VI and the Spanish prime minister Pedro Sánchez. In late July, Orsi met with Sánchez at a summit held in Chile with other presidents where a joint editorial entitled "Democracy always", signed by the presidents, was presented. After returning from the presidents' meeting in Chile, Orsi met on Tuesday 22 July with Spanish prime minister Pedro Sánchez at the Executive Tower, where they announced the signing of six agreements focused on sustainability, the battle against organized crime, and the promotion of gender equality in joint actions between both countries.

On Monday 19 January 2026, Uruguay expressed its condolences to Spain for the serious railway accident that occurred on Sunday 18 January in the locality of Adamuz, province of Córdoba, which left dead and wounded. Between Friday 17 and Sunday 19 April, President Yamandú Orsi travelled to Barcelona where he had an agenda of activities, such as taking part in the so-called Summit in Defense of Democracy, which brought together different progressive leaders.

==== Italy ====
On Wednesday 15 October, President Yamandú Orsi began his trip to Italy to take part in the 45th celebration of World Food Day and the 80th anniversary of the Food and Agriculture Organization —FAO—, on the morning of Thursday 16, together with Minister of Foreign Affairs Mario Lubetkin. To subsequently meet with the president of the Italian Republic, Sergio Mattarella, and the mayor of Rome, Roberto Gualtieri. With the return of the authorities on Saturday 18 October. On Sunday 28 November, Uruguay announced that it adheres to the new Community of Italophony, founded on the 18th of that month.

==== Netherlands ====
On 22 May 2025, Minister of Industry Fernanda Cardona, and a technical team from the MIEM, UTE, Ancap and Uruguay XXI attended World Hydrogen Summit & Exhibition, held in the Netherlands.

==== Portugal ====
On Thursday 4 September, the Uruguayan Foreign Ministry issued a statement of regret to Portugal over the derailment of the "Elevador da Glória" funicular tram that had occurred the previous day and caused loss of life and numerous injuries.

==== United Kingdom ====
Between 20 and 23 May 2025, an official delegation from Uruguay made up of the Secretary of the Presidency, Jorge Díaz, and the Minister of the Interior, Carlos Negro, met with relevant figures in the United Kingdom in the fields of security, combating cybercrime and drug trafficking. Likewise, the creation and implementation of a Ministry of Justice would be addressed, because of the United Kingdom's establishment of such a department 20 years earlier. On Tuesday 16 September 2025, a Free Trade Treaty was signed between MERCOSUR and the countries of EFTA, one of them Switzerland.

==== Switzerland ====
On Thursday 26 June, it was announced that, for the first time, Uruguay, through the Ministry of Economy and Finance, placed its first debt in Swiss francs for the equivalent of 400 million dollars at a fixed rate and in two tranches: at 5 and 10 years, in what was also the debut of Yamandú Orsi's government in the international market. For this purpose, the French BNP Paribas and the Swiss UBS were mandated, placing 200 million dollars at five years with a spread of 93 basis points and a rate of 1.04% and another 200 million dollars at ten years with a spread of 113 points and a rate of 1.62%.

==== Russia ====
On Thursday 29 May 2025, the Foreign Ministry named 12 new ambassadors, among them designating Rosario Portell as ambassador to Russia. Portell's designation was controversial because of her professional career: for not having a career in the Foreign Service, not having a university degree and not handling more than one language; in addition to having previously been dismissed twice during the presidencies of Tabaré Vázquez.

==== Ukraine ====
At a press conference on Sunday 2 March, Foreign Minister Mario Lubetkin showed himself favorable to Ukraine's intention to open an embassy in Uruguay. In late April, during Foreign Minister Lubetkin's trip to the Vatican for the funeral of Pope Francis, the official met with his Ukrainian counterpart, Andrii Sybiha, who invited Uruguay to participate in the Recovery Conference of his country in Rome and reiterated the intention to open an embassy in Uruguay. In a press conference, on Tuesday 15 July, the Minister of Livestock, Agriculture and Fisheries, Alfredo Fratti, remarked that Uruguay finalized the opening of the Ukrainian market for beef and sheep meat.

==== European organizations ====
===== EFTA =====
On Tuesday 16 September 2025, a Free Trade Treaty was signed in Rio de Janeiro between MERCOSUR and EFTA —Switzerland, Norway, Iceland and Liechtenstein—.

===== European Union =====
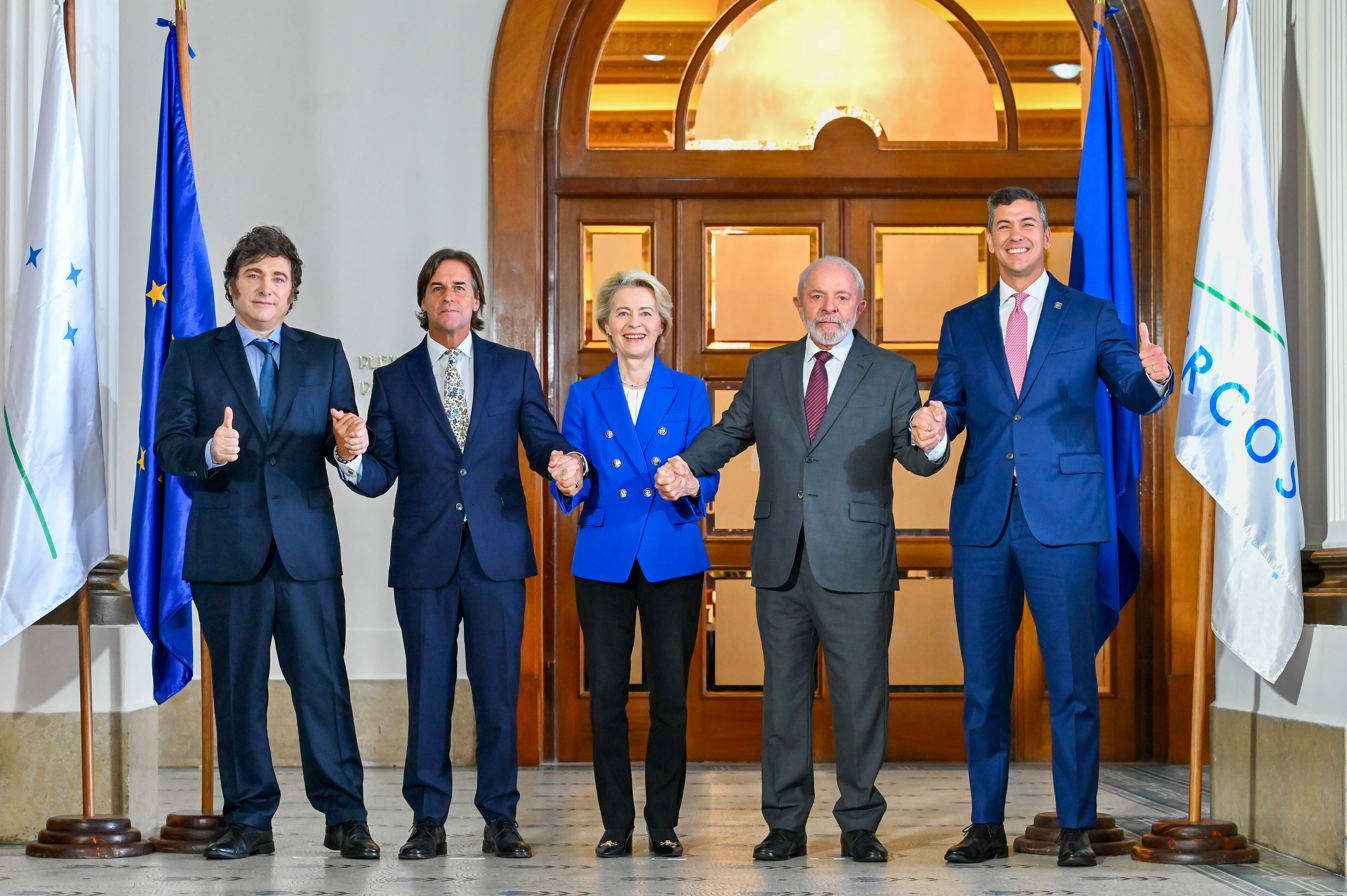
MERCOSUR Summit held in Montevideo in December 2024. From left to right: Javier Milei, president of Argentina; Luis Lacalle Pou, president of Uruguay; Ursula von der Leyen, president of the European Commission; Lula da Silva, president of Brazil; and Santiago Peña, president of Paraguay.

On Friday 6 December 2024, during the stage of government transition between Luis Lacalle Pou and Yamandú Orsi, the MERCOSUR Summit began in Montevideo, where the final text of the free trade treaty between MERCOSUR and the European Union was closed after almost 25 years of negotiations.

One day after taking office, on Sunday 2 March 2025, at the Estévez Palace in Montevideo, President Yamandú Orsi and his German counterpart Frank-Walter Steinmeier highlighted the importance of the agreement between MERCOSUR and the European Union. Likewise, disagreements were shown with the statements by Argentine president Javier Milei the previous day, before his national Congress, where this president stated that he would seek a trade agreement with the United States of Donald Trump, even if this meant "leaving MERCOSUR", and also accused the organization because it "only succeeded in enriching large Brazilian businesspeople at the cost of impoverishing Argentines".

Months later, on Saturday 17 May 2025, Foreign Minister Mario Lubetkin made an official trip to Brussels where he met with various European Union officials, hoping that by the end of 2025 the European Union - MERCOSUR agreement would be ratified. Between 6 and 20 October 2025, Foreign Minister Mario Lubetkin developed an intense diplomatic agenda during an official mission through Europe that included a presidential trip and visits to Rome, Berlin, Brussels, the Vatican and Barcelona. In mid-December, the countries of the European Union ruled out voting on the trade agreement with Mercosur because of the blockade by France and Italy and planned to leave it for January.

After more than 25 years of negotiations, the EU countries approved on Friday 9 January 2026 the FTA with MERCOSUR, established to be signed on 17 January in the Paraguayan capital of Asunción. On Saturday 17 January 2026, President Yamandú Orsi attended the city of Asunción to take part in the signing of the agreement between MERCOSUR and the European Union. On Wednesday 21 January 2026, the European Parliament held a first vote on the free trade agreement, and resolved to go to the Court of Justice of the European Union so that it would rule on the validity of the treaty signed the previous Saturday in Paraguay, which implies that the interim application of the pact is delayed by several months.

On Tuesday 10 February, Foreign Minister Lubetkin delivered to the Legislative Branch the authenticated agreement between MERCOSUR and the EU, so that the parliamentary process would begin. On Wednesday 25 February, the Senate unanimously approved the first legislative approval of the MERCOSUR-EU agreement. On Thursday 26 February, the Chamber of Representatives approved, by 91 votes in favor and 2 against, the MERCOSUR and EU agreement, being the first South American country to approve it.On Friday 1 May, the agreement between MERCOSUR and the European Union entered into force.

=== Other organizations and forums ===
==== Comprehensive and Progressive Agreement for Trans-Pacific Partnership ====
In late May 2025, in an interview given to the outlet La Diaria, Foreign Minister Lubetkin stated that the Foreign Ministry was continuing the plan for Uruguay to enter the CPTPP ―Comprehensive and Progressive Agreement for Trans-Pacific Partnership―, although he stated that some member countries prefer Uruguay not to enter for reasons of commercial competition. In an interview by the outlet El Observador with the foreign minister published in July, Lubetkin stated that "we are very far away" regarding Uruguay's entry into the Trans-Pacific. Months later, in the early hours of Friday 21 September 2025, Foreign Ministry authorities announced Uruguay's entry into the CPTPP after being accepted by Australia, Brunei, Canada, Chile, Japan, Malaysia, Mexico, New Zealand, Peru, Singapore, United Kingdom and Vietnam.

==== BRICS ====
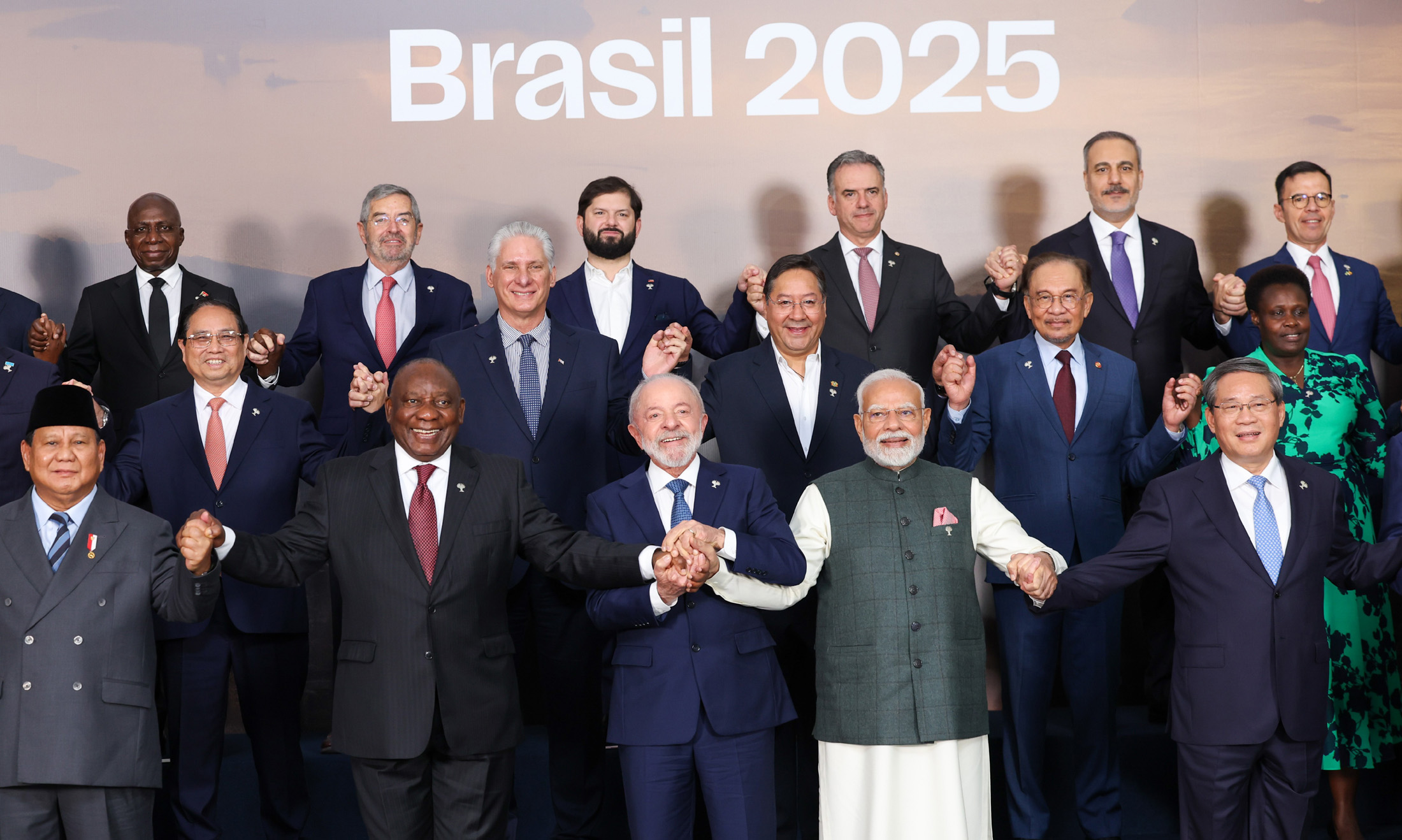
Photograph among heads of state during the 17th BRICS Summit, among them Yamandú Orsi.

During the government transition between the administration of Luis Lacalle Pou and Yamandú Orsi, on Friday 27 December 2024, president-elect Yamandú Orsi received the former president of Brazil and president of the BRICS New Development Bank ―NDB―, Dilma Rousseff. At that meeting, the head of the NDB proposed to the president-elect Uruguay's accession to the bank; the country's entry into the NDB was previously approved in 2021, during the administration of Luis Lacalle Pou, but its formalization did not occur in practice.

On 1 March 2025, the day of the inauguration of the government headed by Yamandú Orsi, President Lula da Silva invited Uruguay, together with Mexico and Colombia, to participate in the BRICS summit scheduled for July 2025 in Rio de Janeiro. On Friday 4 July, Yamandú Orsi travelled to Rio de Janeiro to take part in the 17th BRICS Summit, from 6 to 7 July, where he held multiple bilateral meetings.

==== CEFIR ====
The Training Center for Regional Integration ―CEFIR― is a Uruguayan research center that promotes integration in Latin America, serving as a forum for exchange and development of public policies. On Wednesday 14, President Yamandú Orsi took part in a meeting for exchange and reflection on international and regional current affairs organized by that center, where he indicated his intention to prepare a document that would serve as a basis for the president to make a future call to all political parties, with the objective that it be adopted as Uruguay's official and agreed position before the various world events. An idea that was questioned by the opposition.

==== G20 ====
After President Yamandú Orsi's participation in the 17th BRICS Summit, held in July 2025 in Brazil, Foreign Minister Mario Lubetkin announced to the press that Uruguay was invited to participate in the next meeting of the G20, scheduled for November 2025 in Johannesburg, South Africa.

==== United Nations ====
On Monday 28 April 2025, President Orsi and Foreign Minister Lubetkin received the deputy secretary-general of the United Nations, Amina Mohammed. On Tuesday 3 June, President Orsi took part in a virtual meeting convened by the secretary-general of the United Nations, António Guterres, as a meeting prior to the 4th International Conference on Financing for Sustainable Development to be held in Seville, Spain, between 30 June and 3 July. On Sunday 21 September, President Yamandú Orsi travelled to the United States, scheduled to take part in various activities such as his participation in the opening of the General Debate of the 80th session of the United Nations General Assembly. On Tuesday 23 September, President Orsi gave his first speech as head of state at the UN General Assembly. On Monday 2 February 2026, Uruguay received the director general of FAO, Qu Dongyu, together with a delegation from that organization.

===== World Health Organization =====
At the 78th World Health Assembly, held in Geneva, Switzerland, from 19 to 27 May 2025, Health Minister Cristina Lustemberg participated.

===== International Labour Organization =====
In early June 2025, Uruguay was elected by acclamation to occupy the Government vice presidency of the International Labour Conference held in Geneva, Switzerland, between 2 and 13 June 2025; the post being held by the Minister of Labour and Social Security, Juan Castillo. In that post, Uruguay ratified ILO Convention No. 187, which establishes a promotional framework for occupational health and safety.

==== Group of 77 ====
In New York, on Wednesday 14 January, Foreign Minister Mario Lubetkin assumed on behalf of Uruguay, for the first time, the presidency of the Group of 77, a group of developing countries.

==== Peacekeeping missions ====
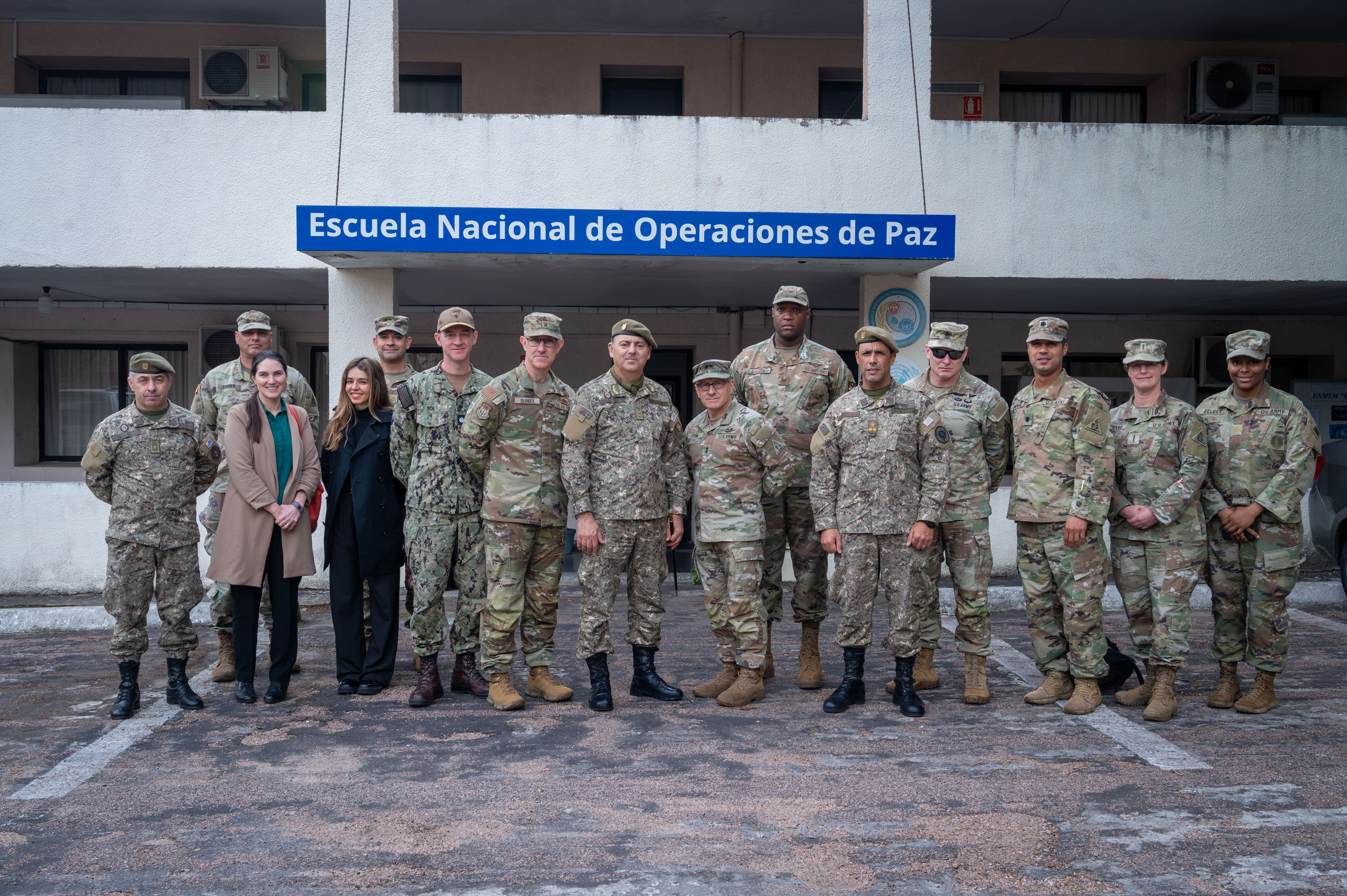

During the transition stage from the government of Luis Lacalle Pou to that of Yamandú Orsi, on Saturday 25 president-elect Orsi conveyed his condolences on social media to the family of the Uruguayan soldier who died, and to the other wounded soldiers, while serving in a peacekeeping mission in the Democratic Republic of the Congo ―MONUSCO― after an attack by the rebel group M23 that occurred that day.

A few days after the inauguration of the government, on 11 March 2025, Foreign Minister Lubetkin met with the UN secretary-general, António Guterres, with whom he agreed to begin the relief of Uruguayan troops serving in MONUSCO and to start an investigation into the attack by the M23 rebel group. On Monday 26 May, relatives of the soldiers deployed in the Congo appeared at the Executive Tower to deliver a letter addressed to President Yamandú Orsi in which they demanded their return to Uruguay; which should have occurred at the end of January but the attack that occurred on 25 January frustrated the plans. On Thursday 19 June, the deputy secretary-general of the United Nations, Amina Mohammed, received Foreign Minister Mario Lubetkin in New York to define aspects related to Uruguayan troops present in the Congo. The following day, in a press conference between Foreign Minister Mario Lubetkin and Defense Minister Sandra Lazo, the return of the soldiers to Uruguay on 3 July at approximately eight o'clock at night was confirmed. On Friday 4 July, President Yamandú Orsi greeted in a ceremony during the morning the 200 soldiers who served in MONUSCO, before leaving later that day for Brazil. On Wednesday 6 August, the contingent of 200 Uruguayan soldiers, which had departed Uruguay on 4 July, managed to enter the Congo from Uganda; a delay caused by the clash of DRC forces with rebels of the M23 movement, and after a long negotiation with the United Nations.

=== Controversies ===
==== Designation of Carolina Ache and Beatriz Argimón as ambassadors ====
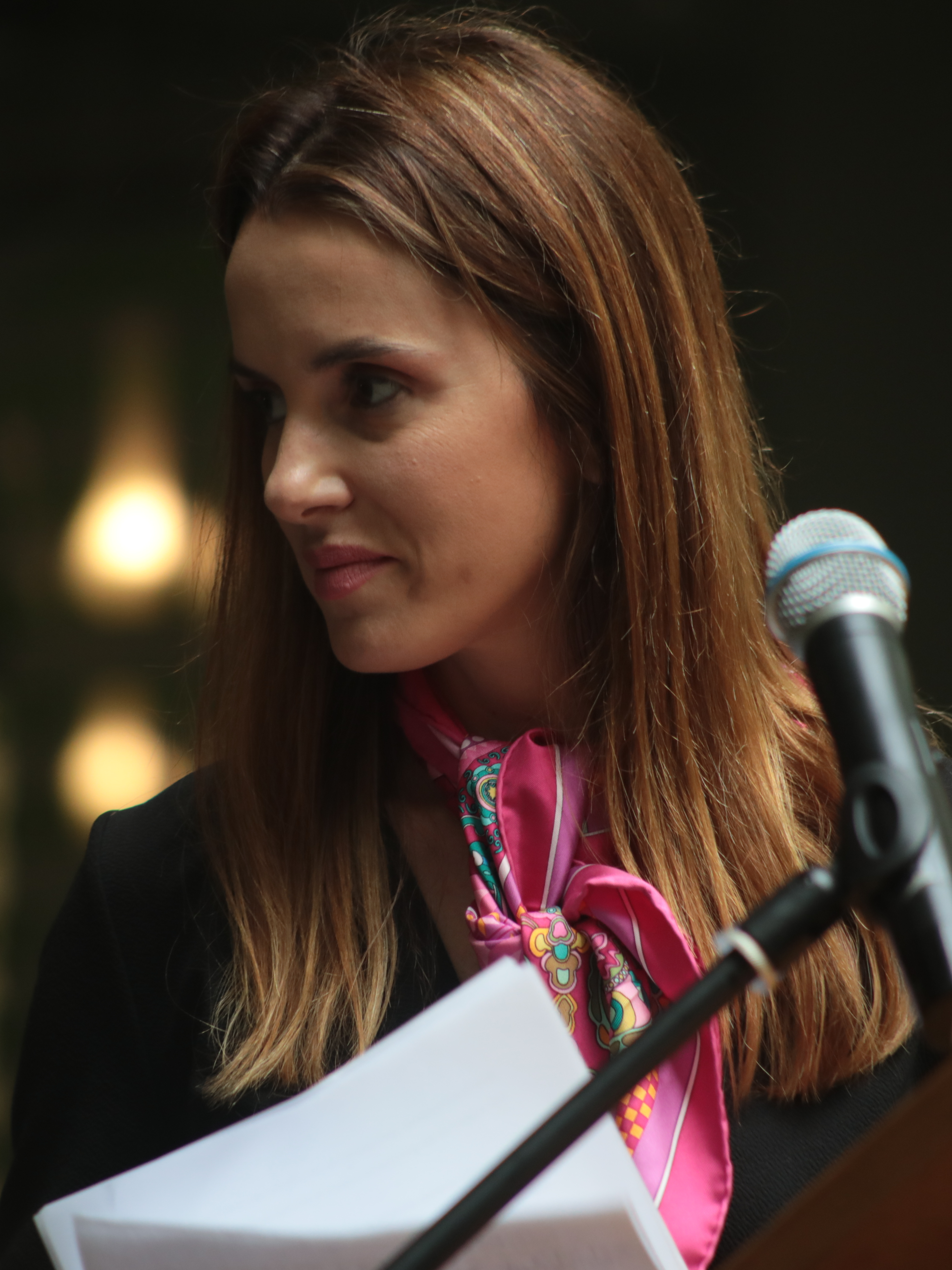
Carolina Ache

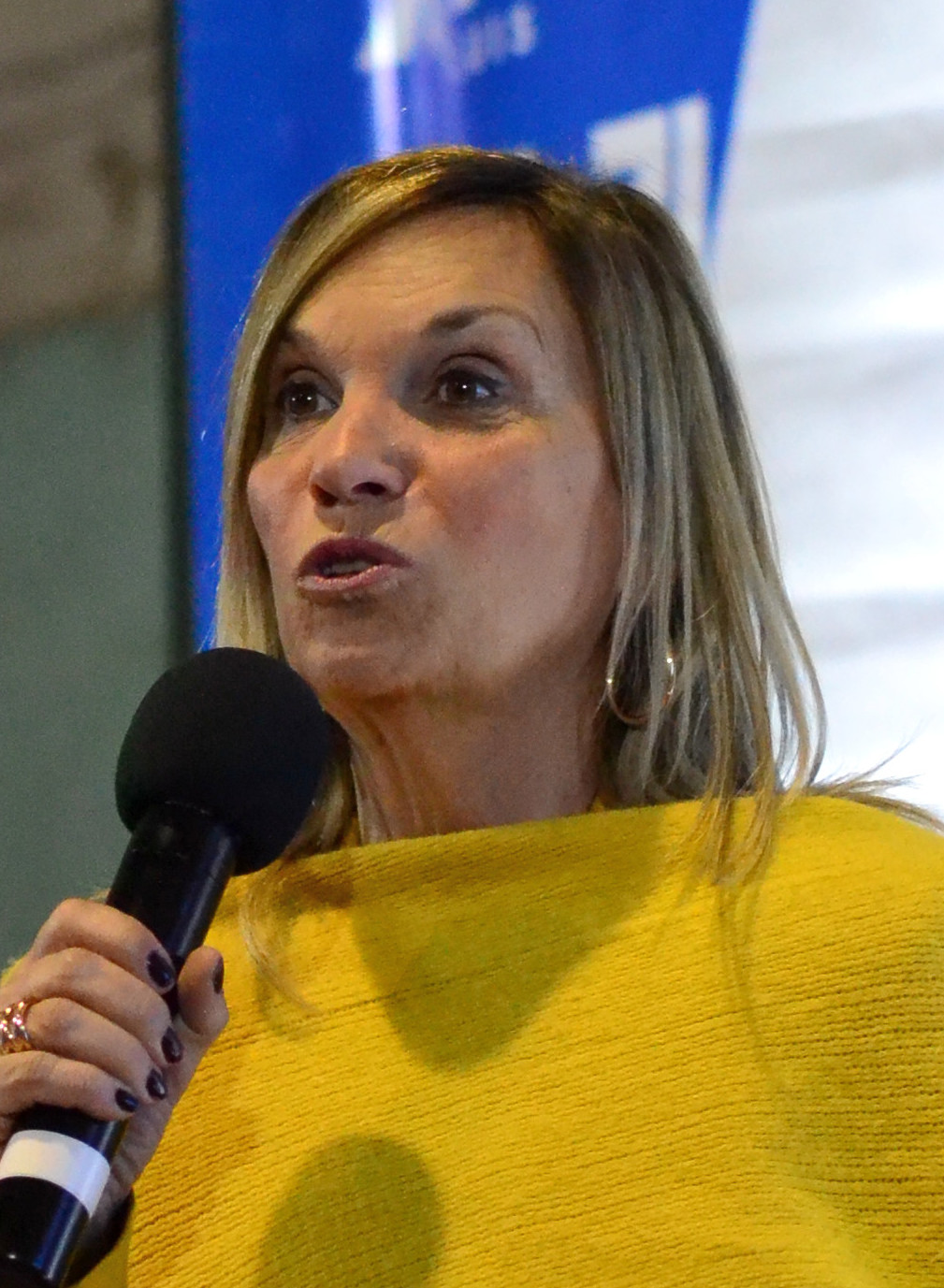
Beatriz Argimón

On Thursday 29 May 2025, the Foreign Ministry announced a new batch of twelve ambassadors of the government; among the new designations two were controversial: that of the Colorado leader, former presidential pre-candidate and former undersecretary of Foreign Affairs, Carolina Ache Batlle, who resigned after the Marset case; and that of the National Party leader and former vice president of the Republic during the Lacalle Pou government, Beatriz Argimón. It was announced that the former vice president would be the Uruguayan representative to the United Nations Educational, Scientific and Cultural Organization ―Unesco― and the Organisation for Economic Co-operation and Development ―OECD―, while the Colorado leader would head the delegation in Portugal. In the following days, opposition legislators showed their discontent, announcing that they would not vote for any or at least one of the confirmations. After the announcement, National Party senator Graciela Bianchi went so far as to state that Beatriz Argimón "operated with the FA for the five years" of Luis Lacalle Pou's government. On the other hand, Broad Front senator Óscar Andrade stated that he "did not understand the designation" of Ache.

On Monday 2 June, the senator and former National Party presidential candidate, Álvaro Delgado, stated that he would accompany Argimón's designation, although he clarified that it would not be in representation of the National Party; and that he would not accompany Ache's. Likewise, Argimón met with National Party leaders to discuss her designation. That same day, the National Executive Committee of the Colorado Party resolved to reject the designation of Carolina Ache as the government's ambassador in Portugal, and asked President Yamandú Orsi not to send the confirmation request to the Senate. On Friday 6 June, President Orsi supported Ache's designation before the press; he maintained that there were no arguments to reverse the decision. On Monday 9 June, the outlet Búsqueda reported that the previous Friday Lacalle had met with Argimón and there supported her designation as ambassador.

Months later, on Friday 3 October, the Executive Branch sent to the Senate the confirmations for the designation of Carolina Ache at the head of the Embassy of Uruguay in Portugal, and of Beatriz Argimón at the head of the national representation before UNESCO. Finally, on the night of Tuesday 15 October, the Senate approved the confirmation of Beatriz Argimón before UNESCO with 24 votes in favor out of a total of 27, with the opposition of some senators from the National Party and the Colorado Party. The following day, Wednesday 15 October, the Senate approved the designation of Carolina Ache as Uruguayan ambassador to Portugal, only with the votes of the Broad Front; all senators from the National Party and the Colorado Party voted against, resulting in 17 positives out of 31. On Thursday 25 November, by two separate resolutions, both Beatriz Argimón and Carolina Ache Batlle were officially designated as permanent representative and ambassador, respectively. In late December, Ache filed a complaint for defamation and insults against former foreign minister Francisco Bustillo, and National Party senators Sebastián da Silva and Sergio Botana.

==== Issuance of new Uruguayan passports ====
On 15 April 2025, the Ministry of the Interior announced, promoted by the Secretariat of State, changes in ordinary passports, issued by the National Directorate of Civil Identification, following recommendations of the ICAO and benefiting legal citizens: modification of the title "Nationality", becoming "Nationality/Citizenship" and entering the code "URY" for both natural and legal citizens; the elimination of the title "Place of birth"; among others.

In the following months, the new passport caused problems with two European countries: France and Germany, which decided not to allow entry to Uruguayans with a passport issued after 23 April 2025, arguing that the new passports do not indicate the person's place of birth. On Wednesday 9 July, the government issued a statement reporting that both the Ministry of Foreign Affairs and the Ministry of the Interior inform affirm that the adaptation of the passports, of 16 April 2025, is in line with international Civil Aviation standards ―ICAO―. The following day, President Yamandú Orsi expressed willingness to correct the situation if the international context so required.

The German ambassador in Montevideo, Stefan Duppel, confirmed that the new Uruguayan passports would not be accepted to enter his country, not even for short stays, because of the lack of information on place of birth. Meanwhile the French ambassador, Jean-Paul Seytre, reiterated the suspension of the reception of visa applications for France for stays longer than three months. Later, Japan joined the alerts over Uruguayan passports, and reported that "it is highly likely that they will be denied entry into the country", although entry for a maximum period of 90 days, where a visa is not necessary, if the trip is for tourism, visiting relatives, business meetings, among others, was not modified.

On Thursday 24 July, Foreign Minister Mario Lubetkin assured that the technicians of the Ministry of Foreign Affairs are focused on "solving the problem" faced by Uruguayan students with the new passport, who have reported difficulties entering France and Germany. Nevertheless, the minister clarified that, although Uruguay is considering some solutions, the last word in this matter belongs to the authorities of those countries and that modification of the new passports is not planned "unless contrary proof shows that there are errors". However, on Tuesday 29 July, the Foreign Ministry issued a statement in which, although it reiterated that the new passports were in accordance with current ICAO regulations, it reported that from 1 August 2025 the previous version of Uruguayan passports would be used again, because it "is internationally valid and recognized". After the reversal in the issuance of new passports, requests for resignation against Lubetkin were expressed from the opposition, who obtained President Orsi's support to continue in his post.

=== International trips ===
==== During the transition ====
===== 2024 =====
Country	City(ies)	Date	Main purpose – Activity	Photograph
Brazil	Brasília	28–29 November	Only trip during the transition as president-elect. Together with other advisers, Orsi met with President Lula da Silva with the aim of initiating talks to accelerate the bidding processes for the Yaguarón bridge in Cerro Largo and the dredging of the San Gonzalo Channel, which connects Laguna Merín, shared by Brazil and Uruguay, with Lagoa dos Patos, in Brazilian territory.	

==== During the presidency ====
===== 2025 =====
Country	City(ies)	Date	Main purpose – Activity	Photograph
Panama	Panama City	6–7 April	First trip of the administration, business mission with a delegation composed of Foreign Minister Mario Lubetkin and Uruguayan entrepreneurs from the rice sector.	
Honduras	Tegucigalpa	8–9 April	Arrival in Honduras to take part in the IX Summit of the CELAC, held in Tegucigalpa, capital of Honduras.	
Argentina	Buenos Aires	9 June	In the context of the 2nd Latin American edition of the Ana Frank Awards, in Buenos Aires, President Yamandú Orsi traveled together with former presidents Luis Lacalle Pou and Julio María Sanguinetti to receive, on behalf of Uruguay, the award for democratic commitment, institutional respect, and the construction of peaceful coexistence.	
Spain	Seville	28 June – 1 July	To take part in the International Conference on Financing for Sustainable Development, organized by the United Nations.	
Argentina	Buenos Aires	2–3 July	To participate in the XLVI Summit of MERCOSUR Presidents.	
Brazil	Rio de Janeiro	4–9 July	To take part in the XVII BRICS Summit.	
Chile	Santiago	20–22 July	To take part in a summit between the presidents of Chile, Brazil, Colombia, and Spain to discuss strengthening democracy in the region, combating disinformation, multilateralism, reducing inequalities, and regulating emerging technologies, in order to present conclusions at the 80th session of the United Nations General Assembly in New York. Additionally, to draft and present a joint editorial titled Democracia siempre, signed by the leaders.	
United States	New York City	21–27 September	To take part in the opening of the General Debate of the 80th session of the United Nations General Assembly, deliver an address, participate in a roundtable In Defense of Democracy: combating extremism, and speak at the event Democracia siempre, held in tribute to President José Mujica.	
Italy	Rome	15–18 October	To take part in Rome in the 45th celebration of World Food Day and the 80th anniversary of the Food and Agriculture Organization, among other events. Meetings with authorities such as Giorgia Meloni, Sergio Mattarella, and Roberto Gualtieri.	
Vatican City	Vatican City	17 October	Meeting with Pope Leo XIV, focusing on a potential papal visit to Uruguay and dialogue on peace and its promotion through multilateral organizations.	
Bolivia	La Paz	7–8 November	Attendance at the inauguration of Rodrigo Paz as President of the Plurinational State of Bolivia.	
Brazil	Foz do Iguaçu	19–20 December	To participate in the LXVII MERCOSUR Presidents Summit.	
Trip abroad		27 December – 3 January 2026	Personal vacation.	

===== 2026 =====
Country	City(ies)	Date	Main purpose – Activity	Photograph
Paraguay	Asunción	17 January	To participate in the signing of the free trade agreement between MERCOSUR and the European Union.	
China	Beijing and Shanghai	29 January – 8 February	Official visit with a delegation, including meetings with Chinese authorities such as President Xi Jinping and Premier Li Qiang.	
Argentina	Buenos Aires	4 March	Participation in an event organized by the Inter-American Council of Commerce and Production at the Alvear Palace Hotel in Buenos Aires.	
Chile	Santiago	10–11 March	Meeting with President Gabriel Boric and attendance at the inauguration ceremony of José Antonio Kast.	
Colombia	Bogotá	20–22 March	Participation in the X CELAC Summit, where Uruguay assumed the pro tempore presidency, and bilateral meeting with President Gustavo Petro.	
Spain	Barcelona	16–18 April	Attendance at the meeting of progressive leaders, with Gustavo Petro, Luiz Inácio Lula da Silva, Pedro Sánchez, Claudia Sheinbaum, António Costa, and Gabriel Boric.	
