= 2027 in Uruguay =

- Decades: 2000s; 2010s; 2020s; 2030s
- See also: Other events of 2027; Timeline of Uruguayan history

Events in the year 2027 in Uruguay.

== Events ==
=== Predicted and scheduled ===
- 6 February – Solar eclipse of February 6, 2027 (total eclipse)

== Holidays ==
- 1 January – New Year's Day
- 6 January – Epiphany
- 8 February – Carnival
- 25 March – Maundy Thursday
- 26 March – Good Friday
- 19 April – Landing of the 33 Patriots Day
- 1 May – Labour Day
- 18 May – Battle of Las Piedras Holiday
- 19 June – Birth of Artigas
- 18 July – Constitution Day
- 25 August – Independence Day
- 12 October – Day of the Americas
- 2 November – All Souls' Day
- 25 December – Christmas Day
