= 2026 in Uruguay =

- Decades: 2000s; 2010s; 2020s; 2030s
- See also: Other events of 2026; Timeline of Uruguayan history

Events in the year 2026 in Uruguay.

== Incumbents ==
- President: Yamandú Orsi
- Vice President: Carolina Cosse

== Events ==
- 6–22 February – Uruguay at the 2026 Winter Olympics
- 26 February – Uruguay ratifies the EU–Mercosur Partnership Agreement.
- 1 May – The EU–Mercosur Partnership Agreement comes into effect.
- 11 June–19 July – Uruguay participates at the 2026 FIFA World Cup
- 24 July – The United States imposes a 12.5% tariff on Uruguay, citing the presence of alleged forced labour in the supply chain.
- 6 November – Pope Leo XIV arrives in Montevideo as part of a 12-day tour to Latin America.

== Holidays ==
- 1 January – New Year's Day
- 6 January – Epiphany
- 16 February – Carnival
- 2 April – Maundy Thursday
- 3 April – Good Friday
- 19 April – Landing of the 33 Patriots Day
- 1 May – Labour Day
- 18 May – Battle of Las Piedras Holiday
- 19 June – Birth of Artigas
- 18 July – Constitution Day
- 25 August – Independence Day
- 12 October – Day of the Americas
- 2 November – All Souls' Day
- 25 December – Christmas Day

== Deaths ==
- 20 January: Adela Gleijer (92), actress.
- 21 January: Linda Kohen (101), painter.
- 22 January: Walter Martínez (84), Uruguayan-Venezuelan war correspondent.
- 22 July: Bruno Betancor (22), footballer (Peñarol).
