= 2020 in Uruguay =

- Decades: 2000s; 2010s; 2020s; 2030s
- See also: Other events of 2020; Timeline of Uruguayan history

Events in the year 2020 in Uruguay.

== Incumbents ==
- President: Tabaré Vázquez (until 1 March) - Luis Lacalle Pou (starting 1 March)
- Vice President: Lucía Topolansky (until 1 March) - Beatriz Argimón (starting 1 March)

== Events ==
- 27 January – 2 February – The tennis tournament 2020 Punta Open was held in Punta del Este.
- 1 March – Luis Lacalle Pou took office as President of the Republic.
- 10 March – Uruguay left the Union of South American Nations.
- 13 March – First four cases of COVID-19 were confirmed.
- 24 July – 9 August – Uruguay was scheduled to compete at the 2020 Summer Olympics in Tokyo, having qualified in sailing.

=== Ongoing events ===
- COVID-19 pandemic in Uruguay

== Deaths ==
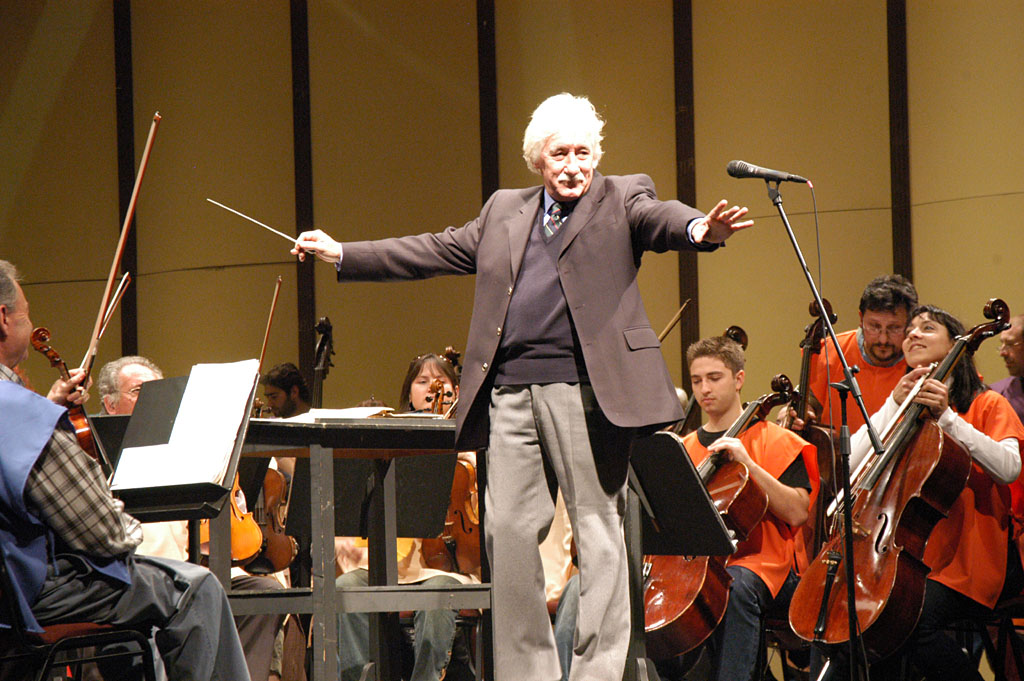
Federico García Vigil

- 17 January – Fernando Miguel Gil Eisner, Roman Catholic bishop (b. 1953).
- 11 February – Carlos Julio Pereyra, politician (b. 1922).
- 28 March – Rodolfo González Rissotto, 71, politician (National Party), Director of Education at the Ministry of Education and Culture (1990–1994) and Minister of National Defense (1995); first case of COVID-19 in Uruguay
- 20 May – Juan Justo Amaro, politician (b. 1930).
- 27 May – Federico García Vigil, composer and conductor (b. 1941).
- 4 August – Alberto Zumarán, politician (b. 1940).
- 10 August – Jacobo Langsner, playwright (b. 1927).
