= Rodolfo González =

Rodolfo González may refer to:

- Rodolfo González Pacheco (1882–1949), Argentine writer, playwright, orator, anarchistic journalist and activist
- Rodolfo González (boxer) (born 1945), Mexican boxer
- Rodolfo González Rissotto (1949–2020), Uruguayan historian, politician and political scientist
- Rodolfo González Valderrama (born 1956), Mexican politician and public servant
- Rodolfo González (golfer) (born 1967), Argentine professional golfer
- Rodolfo González (racing driver) (born 1986), Venezuelan racing driver
- Rodolfo González Aránguiz (born 1989), Chilean footballer

== See also ==
- Rodolfo Gonzales (1928–2005), Mexican American boxer, poet, and political activist
