= APN =

APN may refer to:

== Biology and chemistry ==
- 3-Arylpropiolonitriles, a class of chemical reagents
- Acute pyelonephritis, a urinary tract infection
- Acyl peroxy nitrates, respiratory and eye irritants in photochemical smog

== Computing ==
- Access Point Name, a gateway between mobile networks and frequently the Internet
- Apple Push Notification service
- Application-Layer Protocol Negotiation
- Algebraic Petri net, a kind of Petri net in computer science
- Amazon Partner Network, for Amazon Web Services

== Journalism ==
- APN News & Media, an Australian and New Zealand media company
- Animal Planet (Australia and New Zealand), a television channel
- Novosti Press Agency (Agentstvo pechati Novosti), a Soviet news agency operating 1961–1990

== Organizations ==
- African Parks Network, a private park management institution
- Alberta Playwrights Network, a professional association in Canada
- Americans for Peace Now, a group associated with the Israeli Peace Now movement
- Asia-Pacific Network for Global Change Research, in Kobe, Japan

== Other ==
- Americanist phonetic notation, a system for phonetic transcription
- Advanced practice nurse, a nurse with post-graduate education in nursing
- Alpena County Regional Airport (IATA airport code) in Michigan
- Assessor's parcel number, to identify real property
- IOC code for alpinism at the Olympic Games
