= 1992 in Uruguay =

- Decades: 1970s; 1980s; 1990s; 2000s; 2010s
- See also: Other events of 1992; Timeline of Uruguayan history

Events from the year 1992 in Uruguay

== Incumbents ==
- President: Luis Alberto Lacalle

== Events ==
- On 30th June, 1992, a total solar eclipse in Uruguay ( for about 5m21s)
- 1992 Uruguayan privatisation referendum on 13th December 1992, which resulted in a majority voting in favor of privatization
- Agreement establishing the Inter-American Institute for Global Change Research

== Sport ==
=== July ===
- July 25 to August 9 – Uruguay at the 1992 Summer Olympics in Barcelona, Spain

== Births in 1992 ==
- January 22 – Gonzalo Barreto, footballer
- July 27 – Ramón Arias, footballer
