= SMCC =

SMCC may refer to:

== Organisations ==
- Saint Mary's College of California
- Santa Monica College
- Science Media Centre of Canada
- Seattle Metropolitan Chamber of Commerce
- Sierra Madre Congregational Church
- Southern Maine Community College
- Southwest Mississippi Community College
- South Mountain Community College
- St Mary's Cathedral College, Sydney
- St. Mary's Canossian College
- Syro Malabar Catholic Congress
- Syro-Malabar Catholic Church
- Syro-Malankara Catholic Church

== Science and technology ==
- Social Media in a Corporate Context
- Submarine Command Course
- Sun Microsystems Computer Company
- Succinimidyl 4-(N-maleimidomethyl)cyclohexane-1-carboxylate - heterobifunctional chemical linker
