= 2022 in Uruguay =

- Decades: 2000s; 2010s; 2020s; 2030s
- See also: Other events of 2022; Timeline of Uruguayan history

Events in the year 2022 in Uruguay.

== Incumbents ==
- President: Luis Lacalle Pou
- Vice President: Beatriz Argimón

== Events ==
- 17 January - Flood in Montevideo.
- 2 March – Uruguay voted on a United Nations resolution condemning Russia for its invasion of Ukraine.
- 27 March - The 2022 Uruguayan Law of Urgent Consideration referendum was held.

== Sport ==
Association football

- 2022 Uruguayan Primera División season
- 2022 Uruguayan Segunda División season
- 2022 Supercopa Uruguaya
- 2022 South American U-17 Women's Championship
- 2022 Campeonato Uruguayo Femenino C season
