= Asia-Pacific Network for Global Change Research =

Intergovernmental network in the Asia-Pacific region

Asia-Pacific Network for Global Change Research (APN)
- Founded: March 1996
- Purpose: Global change research, capacity development
- Location: Kobe, Japan
- Coordinates: 34.698380°N 135.215418°E
- Region served: Asia-Pacific region
- Method: Project grants, meetings and workshops, training
- Members: 22 countries
- Website: www.apn-gcr.org

The Asia-Pacific Network for Global Change Research (APN) is an intergovernmental network that promotes policy-oriented research and capacity-building activities related to global change in the region. APN receives financial contribution from the governments of the United States, Japan, Republic of Korea and New Zealand, with in-kind contribution from all it 22 member countries. The APN Secretariat is based in Kobe, Japan, hosted by the Hyogo Prefectural Government.

== History ==
The history of APN dates back to the 1990 White House Conference on Science and Economics Research Related to Global Change, 17–18 April 1990, at which then US President George H. W. Bush invited countries of the world to join the United States in creating regional networks for north–south scientific cooperation at the intergovernmental level to deal with global environmental change research. Later in 1992, President Bush and then Prime Minister of Japan Kiichi Miyazawa signed the 1992 US-Japan Global Partnership Agreement, which, among other things, reaffirmed and strengthened Japan-US commitment to global change research.

Discussions along these lines ultimately resulted in the establishment of three global change research networks: ENRICH for Europe and Africa, APN for Asia and the Pacific, and IAI for the Americas.

APN was formally launched in 1996 at its first intergovernmental meeting held at Chiang Mai, Thailand. In 1997, a competitive process was in place, open to funding applications for scientific research projects relating to global environmental change.

== Membership ==
Starting from 12 countries in 1996, APN membership has grown to 22 as of April 2013. In addition to the 22 full members, institutions and individuals from a number of “approved countries” are eligible for APN funding.

=== APN member countries ===
Country	APN Subregion
Australia	Oceania and Pacific
Bangladesh	South Asia
Bhutan	South Asia
Cambodia	South East Asia
China	Temperate East Asia
Fiji	Oceania and Pacific
India	South Asia
Indonesia	South East Asia
Japan	Temperate East Asia
Lao People's Democratic Republic	South East Asia
Malaysia	South East Asia
Mongolia	Temperate East Asia
Nepal	South Asia
New Zealand	Oceania and Pacific
Pakistan	South Asia
Philippines	South East Asia
Republic of Korea	Temperate East Asia
Russian Federation	Temperate East Asia
Sri Lanka	South Asia
Thailand	South East Asia
United States of America	Oceania and Pacific
Viet Nam	South East Asia

=== APN approved countries ===
- Maldives
- Myanmar
- Singapore
- Pacific Island Countries
