= Bioconjugate Chemistry =

- Discipline: Chemistry, molecular biology
- Language: English
- Edited by: Theresa M. Reineke

Publication details
- History: 1990–present
- Publisher: American Chemical Society (United States)
- Frequency: Monthly
- Impact factor: 4.7 (2022)

Standard abbreviations
- ISO 4: Bioconjugate Chem.
- NLM: Bioconjug Chem

Indexing
- CODEN: BCCHES
- ISSN: 1043-1802 (print); 1520-4812 (web)
- LCCN: 90649356
- OCLC no.: 499596220

Links
- Journal homepage; Online access; Online archive

Bioconjugate Chemistry is a monthly peer-reviewed scientific journal covering research in bioconjugation and the interface between man-made and biological materials. The journal was established in 1990 and is published by the American Chemical Society. It is abstracted and indexed in Chemical Abstracts Service, Scopus, EBSCO databases, ProQuest databases, Index Medicus/MEDLINE/PubMed, and the Science Citation Index Expanded.

The current editor-in-chief is Theresa M. Reineke (University of Minnesota).

According to the Journal Citation Reports, the journal has a 2022 impact factor of 4.7.
