= 2017 in Uruguay =

- Decades: 1990s; 2000s; 2010s; 2020s; 2030s
- See also: Other events of 2017; Timeline of Uruguayan history

Events in the year 2017 in Uruguay.

== Incumbents ==
- President: Tabaré Vázquez
- Vice President: Raúl Fernando Sendic (until September 13), Lucía Topolansky (starting September 13)

== Events ==
- 19 July – Pharmacies begin selling cannabis for recreational use, making Uruguay the first country to establish a nationwide legal retail market for the drug.
- 9 September – Vice President Raúl Sendic announces his resignation following allegations that he misused public funds while serving as head of the state-owned oil company ANCAP. He is the first Uruguayan vice president to resign from office.
- 13 September – Senator Lucía Topolansky is sworn in as vice president, becoming the first woman to hold the office.

== Deaths ==
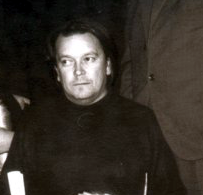
Washington Benavides

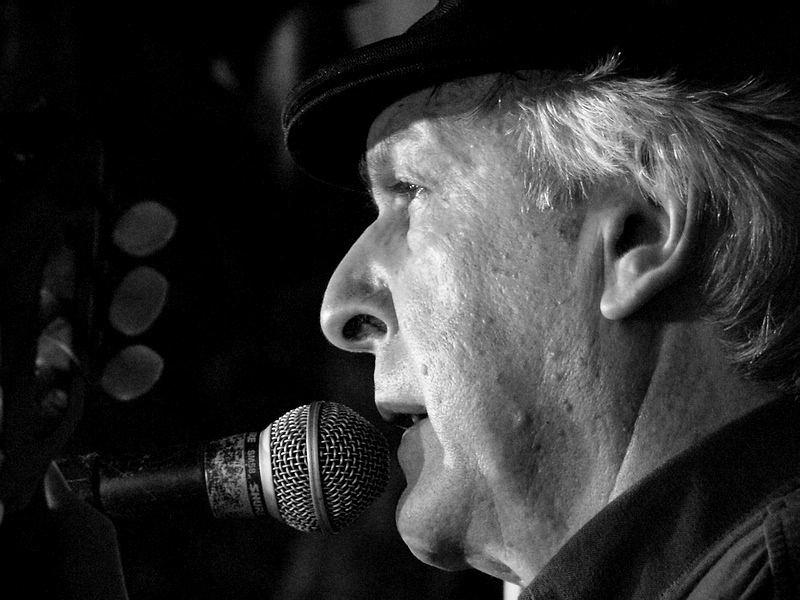
Daniel Viglietti

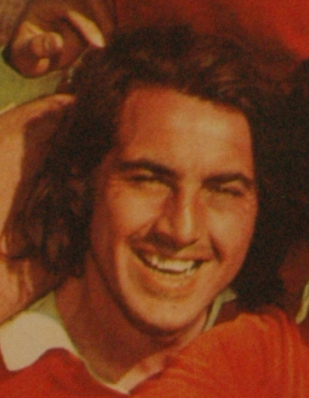
Luis Garisto

- 5 January – Jorge Sanguinetti, politician (b. 1934).
- 24 September – Washington Benavides, poet and musician (b. 1930).
- 8 October – Coriún Aharonián, electroacoustic music composer and musicologist (b. 1940).
- 30 October – Daniel Viglietti, folk singer, guitarist, composer and political activist (b. 1939).
- 20 November – Amir Hamed, writer and translator (b. 1962).
- 21 November – Luis Garisto, footballer (b. 1945).
