= 3-Arylpropiolonitriles =

APN
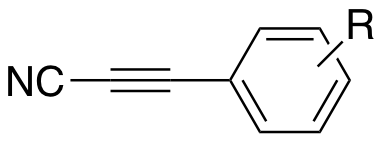

Names
- Other names 3-arylpropynenitrile, 3-arylpropiolonitrile
- Except where otherwise noted, data are given for materials in their standard state (at 25 °C [77 °F], 100 kPa). Infobox references

3-Arylpropiolonitriles (APN) belong to a class of electron-deficient alkyne derivatives substituted by two electron-withdrawing groups – a nitrile and an aryl moieties. Such activation results in improved selectivity towards highly reactive thiol-containing molecules, namely cysteine residues in proteins. APN-based modification of proteins was reported to surpass several important drawbacks of existing strategies in bioconjugation, notably the presence of side reactions with other nucleophilic amino acid residues and the relative instability of the resulting bioconjugates in the blood stream. The latter drawback is especially important for the preparation of targeted therapies, such as antibody-drug conjugates.

== Synthesis ==
The synthesis of 3-arylpropiolonitriles has been the subject of several studies. The most elaborated and often used approach is based on MnO_{2}-mediated free radical oxidation of the corresponding propargylic alcohols obtained using Sonogashira coupling of the corresponding iodo-derivative in the presence of ammonia (Figure 1).

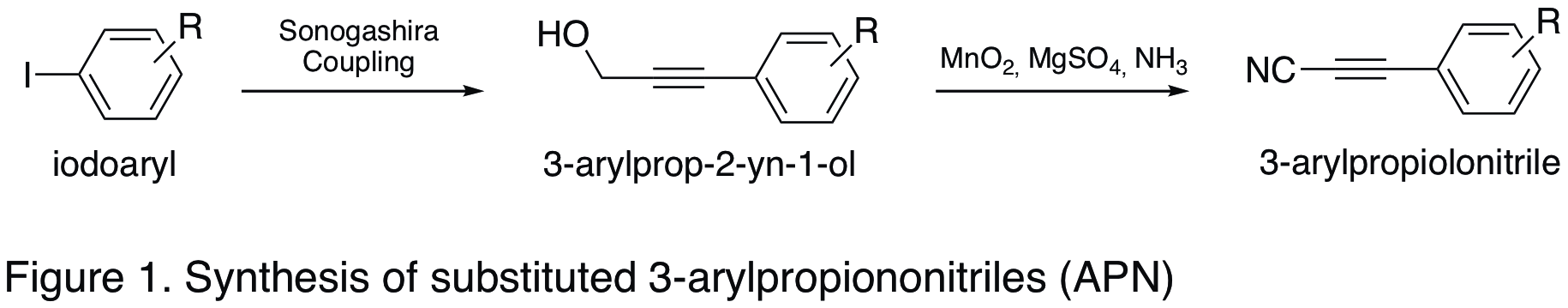

== Applications in biotechnology ==
In bioconjugation (forming a stable covalent link between a biomolecule and a functional payloads, such as fluorescent dyes, cytotoxic agents, or tracers), linking of the payload was classically achieved using maleimide heterobifunctional reagents (for example, see SMCC). However, when administered into living organisms, maleimide-containing bioconjugates were found to be relatively unstable and lose the payload in the blood circulation due to reversibility of the addition reaction between maleimide moiety and cysteine residue of a protein (retro Michael addition). Due to increased stability of bioconjugates obtained with analogous APN-based payloads (a schematic reaction is shown in the Figure 2 below), their use is often preferable when high selectivity and biostability are especially important: namely for the preparation of antibody−drug conjugates and other biologics. Standard procedure for APN protein labeling consists in incubation of a protein containing free cysteine residues with an APN-functionalized probe in PBS buffer at pH 7.5-9.0 at room temperature for 2–12 hours, followed by an optional step of purification of the resulting bioconjugate using size exclusion chromatography or ultrafiltration.

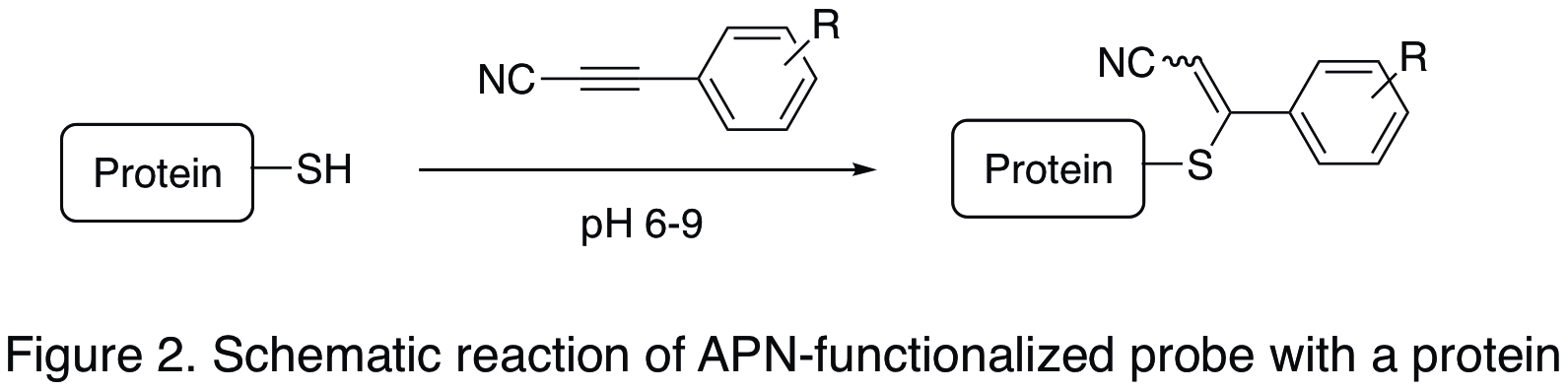
