= Rodolfo González Valderrama =

Mexican politician (born 1956)

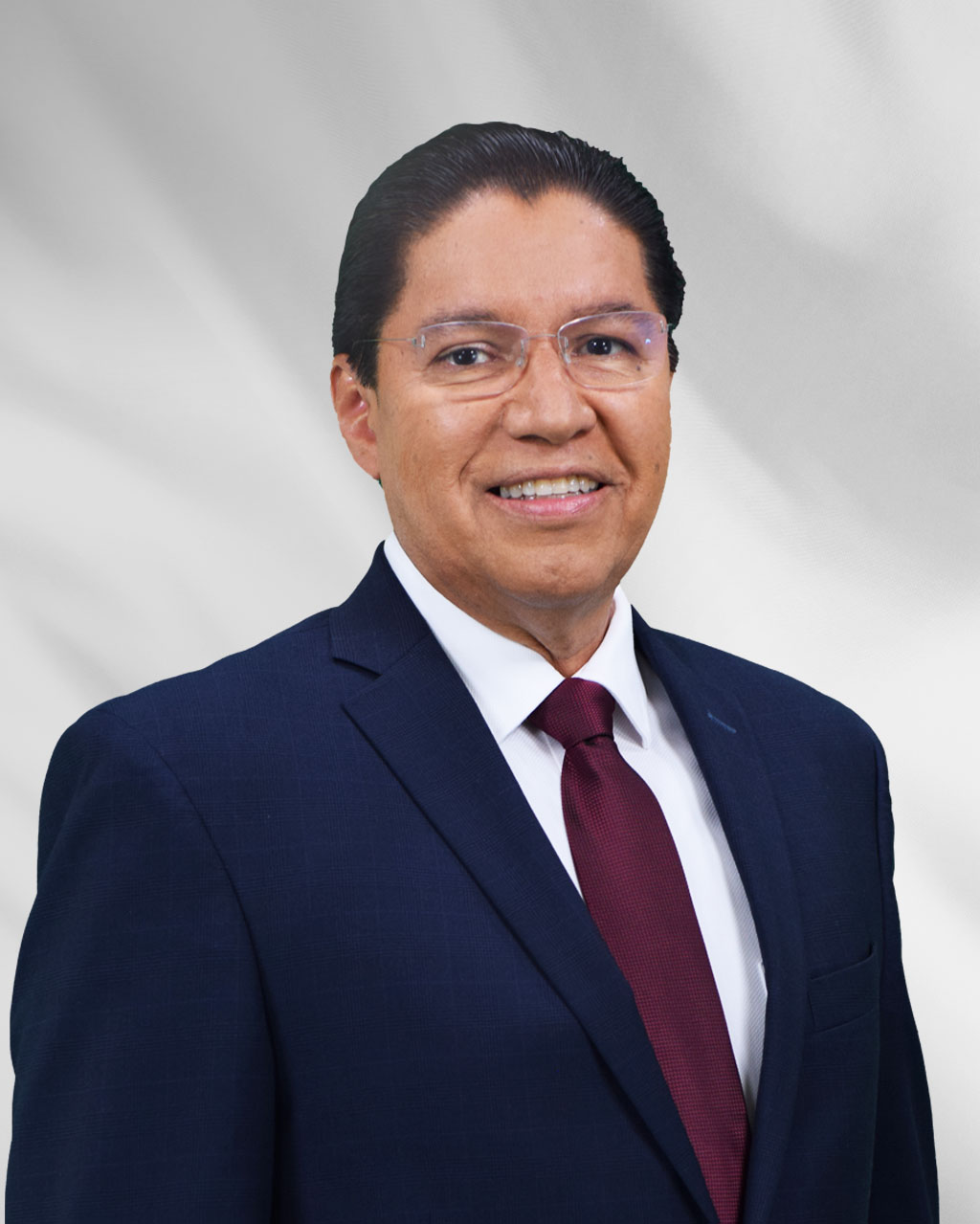

Delegate of Development Programs of Tamaulipas
- Incumbent
- Assumed office October 1, 2021
- President: Andrés Manuel López Obrador
- Preceded by: José Ramón Gómez Leal

General Director of Radio, Television and Cinematography
- In office February 26, 2019 – September 30, 2021
- President: Andrés Manuel López Obrador
- Preceded by: Amadeo Díaz Moguel

Personal details
- Born: April 30, 1956 (age 70) Tampico, Tamaulipas, Mexico
- Party: National Regeneration Movement
- Education: National Autonomous University of Mexico, Ph.D. (1986)

Rodolfo González Valderrama (born April 30, 1956) is a Mexican politician and public servant. He is a member of National Regeneration Movement party and is recognized for holding various official positions such as Head of the Cuauhtémoc Mayor's Office, Director of the Directorate of Radio, Television and Cinematography of the Mexican State and Delegate of Federal Programs for Development in Tamaulipas.

== Early years and studies ==
After finishing his secondary studies, González moved to Mexico City to pursue a bachelor's degree in Sociology at the Faculty of Political and Social Sciences of the National Autonomous University of Mexico (UNAM), the same institution where he obtained a master's degree and a doctorate in law, in 1985 and 1986 respectively.

== Political career ==
Between 1987 and 1988 he served as director of the Municipal Studies Center of the Government of the State of Tamaulipas. A year later he was appointed deputy director of Diffusion and General Coordination of Social Communication of the Presidency of the Republic of Mexico, a position he held until 1992. He worked as a consul assigned to the Consulate of Mexico in Dallas, U.S., between 1993 and 1994, and a year later he became an advisor to the Government Delegation for Peace Negotiations in Chiapas.

After holding various legislative consulting positions and serving as a Representative of the Government of Zacatecas in the Federal District, González joined the Cuauhtémoc Mayor's Office in Mexico City initially as coordinator of delegational development and legal and government director, and in 2018 as delegation head. In February 2019, he began his work as director of the General Directorate of Radio, Television and Cinematography (RTC), an agency that reports to the Secretariat of the Interior.

In September 2021, it was announced that he would leave his position to become the new Delegate of Federal Development Programs in Tamaulipas, replacing José Ramón Gómez Leal. On Friday, October 1, his appointment was announced. That same month it was announced that he would be part of a consultation within the Morena party to aspire to the Governorship of Tamaulipas in the election to be held in June 2022.
