= 2023 in Uruguay =

- Decades: 2000s; 2010s; 2020s; 2030s
- See also: Other events of 2023; Timeline of Uruguayan history

Events in the year 2023 in Uruguay.

== Incumbents ==
- President: Luis Lacalle Pou
- Vice President: Beatriz Argimón

== Deaths ==
- 30 January – Félix Sienra, 107, sailor

== Sport ==
Association football

== See also ==
- 2023 Uruguayan Primera División season
- 2023 Uruguayan Segunda División season
- 2022 Supercopa Uruguaya
