= 2012 in Uruguay =

- Decades: 1990s; 2000s; 2010s; 2020s; 2030s
- See also: Other events of 2012; Timeline of Uruguayan history

Events from the year 2012 in Uruguay

== Incumbents ==
- President: José Mujica
- Vice President: Danilo Astori

== Sport ==
- 13 to 15 January – 2012 Copa Bimbo
- 27 July to 12 August – Uruguay at the 2012 Summer Olympics in London, United Kingdom

=== Unknown dates ===
- 2011–12 Uruguayan Primera División season

== Deaths in 2012 ==
=== January ===
- 1 January – Nina Miranda, 86, tango singer and composer. (born 1925)
