= 1925 in Uruguay =

- Decades: 1900s; 1910s; 1920s; 1930s; 1940s
- See also: Other events of 1925; Timeline of Uruguayan history

Events from the year 1925 in Uruguay

== Incumbents ==
- President: José Serrato

== Events ==
- August 2: 1925 Uruguayan National Administration Council election

== Births ==
- February 25: Eduardo Risso, Olympic rower
