= Bruno Betancor =

Uruguayan footballer (2003–2026)

Personal information
- Full name: Bruno Emanuel Betancor Baeza
- Date of birth: 18 December 2003
- Place of birth: Montevideo, Uruguay
- Date of death: 22 July 2026 (aged 22)
- Height: 1.88 m (6 ft 2 in)
- Position: Forward

Youth career
- Fénix
- 2022–2023: Peñarol

Senior career*
Years	Team	Apps	(Gls)
2023–2024	Peñarol	10	(0)
2024	→ Everton (loan)	7	(1)
2024	→ Rentistas (loan)	12	(0)
2025	Cerro	4	(0)
2025	Al Ain	0	(0)
2026	Cerrito	0	(0)
2026	Deportivo Italiano	4	(2)
Total		37	(3)
- * Club domestic league appearances and goals

Bruno Emanuel Betancor Baeza (18 December 2003 – 22 July 2026) was a Uruguayan professional footballer who played as a forward.

== Career ==
As a child, Betancor played baby fútbol for club Siete Estrellas from the Maroñas neighbourhood, Montevideo, alongside Ignacio Sosa. A product of Fénix, Betancor joined the Peñarol under-19 team in June 2022 and made his professional debut the next year in the Uruguayan Primera División match against Liverpool on 25 March.

In 2024, Betancor moved to Chile and signed on loan with Chilean Primera División club Everton de Viña del Mar on a deal for a year with an option to buy.

His last club was Deportivo Italiano.

== Personal life and death ==
In his identity document, his surname was written Bentancor but he stated it was really Betancor.

Betancor died in the early hours of 22 July 2026, due to cardiorespiratory arrest. He was 22.

== Career statistics ==
Appearances and goals by club, season and competition
Club	Season	League			Cup		Continental		Total	
Club	Season	Division	Apps	Goals	Apps	Goals	Apps	Goals	Apps	Goals
Peñarol	2023	Uruguayan Primera División	11	0	0	0	2	0	13	0
Everton	2024	Chilean Primera División	7	1	0	0	—		7	1
Career total			18	1	0	0	2	0	20	1
