= 1870 in Uruguay =

- Decades: 1850s; 1860s; 1870s; 1880s; 1890s
- See also: Other events of 1870; Timeline of Uruguayan history

Events in the year 1870 in Uruguay.

== Incumbents ==
- President: Lorenzo Batlle y Grau

== Events ==
- September 12 - Revolution of the Lances: Battle of Paso Severino
