= Succinimidyl 4-(N-maleimidomethyl)cyclohexane-1-carboxylate =

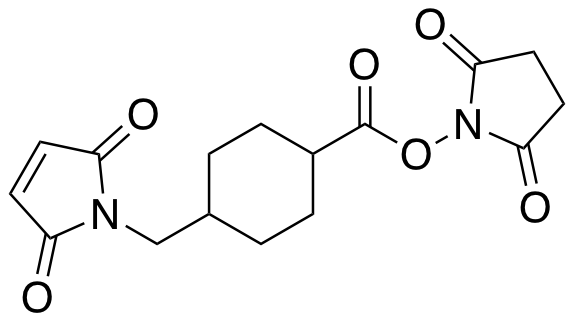

Names
- IUPAC name Succinimidyl 4-(N-maleimidomethyl)cyclohexane-1-carboxylate
- Other names SMCC, 4-(N-maleimidomethyl)cyclohexanecarboxylic acid N-succinimidyl ester

Identifiers
CAS Number	64987-85-5
3D model (JSmol)	Interactive image
ChEBI	CHEBI:63174
ChemSpider	111419
ECHA InfoCard	100.123.863
EC Number	613-734-7
PubChem CID	125175
UNII	B357P1G1IF
CompTox Dashboard (EPA)	DTXSID30215307
- InChI: InChI=1S/C16H18N2O6/c19-12-5-6-13(20)17(12)9-10-1-3-11(4-2-10)16(23)24-18-14(21)7-8-15(18)22/h5-6,10-11H,1-4,7-9H2 Key: JJAHTWIKCUJRDK-UHFFFAOYSA-N
- SMILES: O=C(C1CCC(CN2C(C=CC2=O)=O)CC1)ON3C(CCC3=O)=O

Properties
Chemical formula	C_{16}H_{18}N_{2}O_{6}
Molar mass	334.328 g·mol^{−1}
Appearance	White solid
Melting point	175 °C (347 °F; 448 K)

Hazards
- GHS labelling
Pictograms	(GHS07: Exclamation mark)
Signal word	Warning
Hazard statements	H315, H319, H335
Precautionary statements	P261, P264, P271, P280, P302+P352, P304+P340, P305+P351+P338, P312, P321, P332+P313, P337+P313, P362, P403+P233, P405, P501
- Except where otherwise noted, data are given for materials in their standard state (at 25 °C [77 °F], 100 kPa). Infobox references

Succinimidyl 4-(N-maleimidomethyl)cyclohexane-1-carboxylate (SMCC) is a heterobifunctional amine-to-sulfhydryl crosslinker, which contains two reactive groups at opposite ends: N-hydroxysuccinimide-ester and maleimide, reactive with amines and thiols respectively. SMCC is often used in bioconjugation to link proteins with other functional entities (fluorescent dyes, tracers, nanoparticles, cytotoxic agents). For example, a targeted anticancer agent – trastuzumab emtansine (antibody-drug conjugate containing an antibody trastuzumab chemically linked to a highly potent drug DM-1) – is prepared using SMCC reagent.
