= 2016 in Uruguay =

- Decades: 1990s; 2000s; 2010s; 2020s; 2030s
- See also: Other events of 2016; Timeline of Uruguayan history

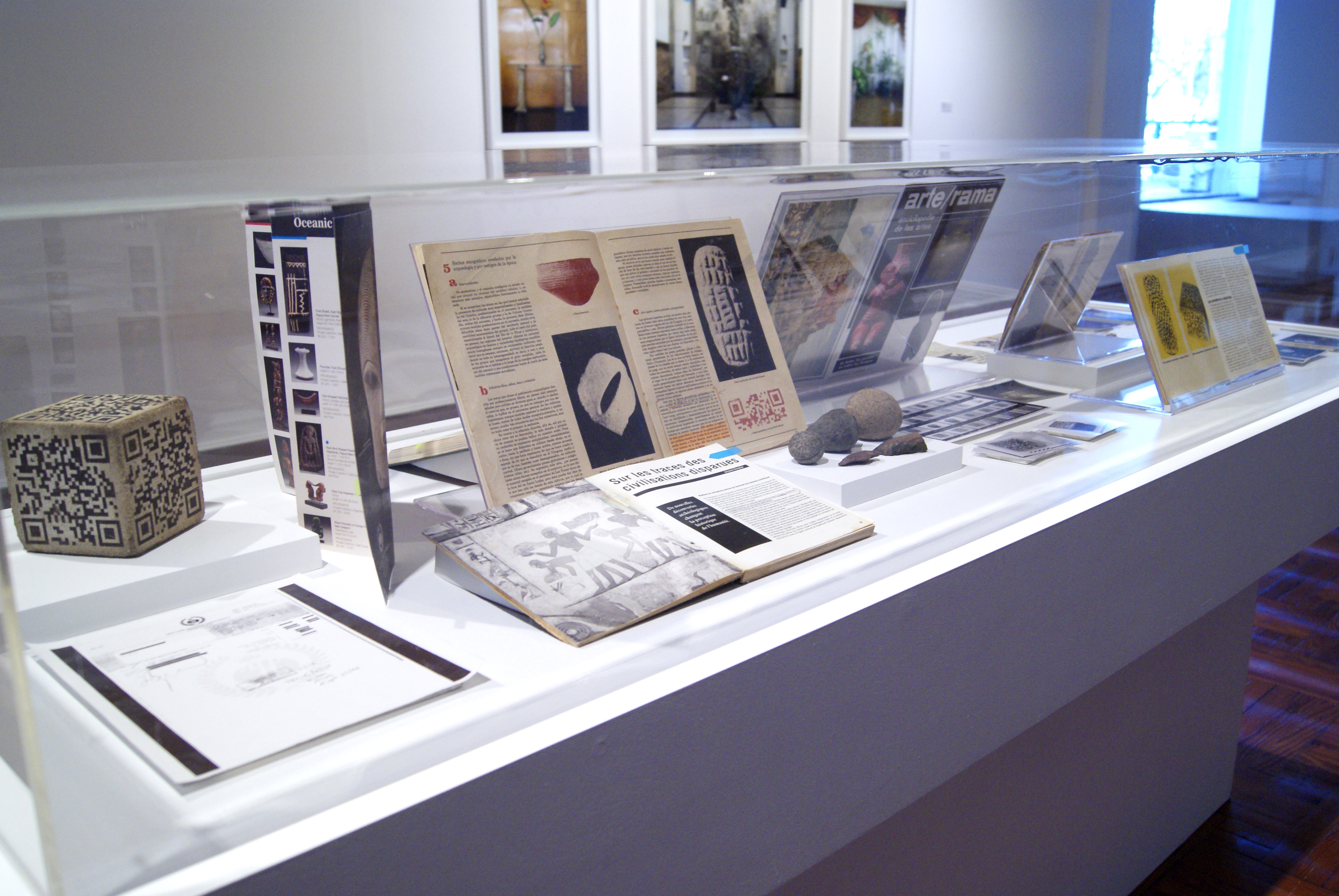
Installation by Uruguayan artist Eloísa Ibarra, winner of the 2016 National Visual Arts Prize.

The following lists events that have happened or will happen during 2016 in Uruguay.

== Incumbents ==
- President: Tabare Vasquez
- Vice President: Raúl Fernando Sendic

== Events ==
=== April ===
- April 15 – 2016 Uruguay tornado, an F3 tornado strikes the southwestern Uruguayan city of Dolores, killing five.

=== November ===
- November 7 – The Partido de la Gente is founded.
