= 2019 in Uruguay =

- Decades: 1990s; 2000s; 2010s; 2020s; 2030s
- See also: Other events of 2019; Timeline of Uruguayan history

Events in the year 2019 in Uruguay.

== Incumbents ==
- President: Tabaré Vázquez
- Vice President: Lucía Topolansky

== Events ==
=== June ===
- 30 June – 2019 Uruguayan presidential primaries

=== October ===
- 27 October – first round of the 2019 Uruguayan general election

=== November ===
- 24 November – runoff of the 2019 Uruguayan general election
