= Federico García Vigil =

Uruguayan conductor and composer (1941–2020)

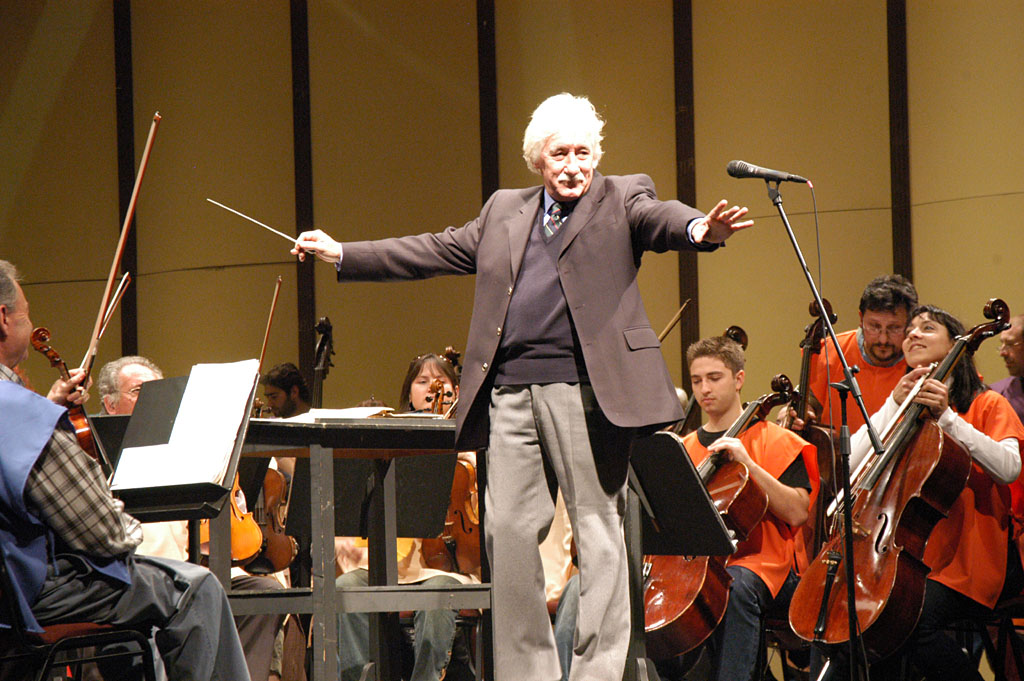
Federico García Vigil in 2006.

Federico García Vigil (5 January 1941 – 27 May 2020) was a Uruguayan composer and conductor. He was the conductor of the Montevideo Philharmonic Orchestra from 1994 to 2008.
