= 2022 Campeonato Uruguayo Femenino C season =

Campeonato Uruguayo Femenino C
- Season: 2022
- Dates: 17 July – October 2022

The 2022 Campeonato Uruguayo Femenino C season (2022 Women's Uruguayan Championship C) is the 1st season of the Women's Uruguayan Championship C, Uruguay's third division women's football league and organized by the Uruguayan Football Association. The season is played in two tournaments, Apertura and Clausura, and started on 17 July 2022 due to delays.

== Description ==
=== Format ===
The teams compete in a two-stages system, Apertura and Clausura tournaments, each one consisting of seven gameweeks, from where the champion team and the promotions are defined. The 2022 season of women's football leagues began as late as July due to several deferrals, that then led to criticism of Uruguayan Football Association resolutions by women players.

=== Teams ===
Seven teams competed in the Campeonato Uruguayo Femenino C this season, which were confirmed along the fixture on 6 July:

Team	Home city
Cerrito	Montevideo
Cerro	Montevideo
Huracán Buceo	Montevideo
Keguay	Toledo
La Luz City Park	Parque del Plata
Paso de la Arena	Montevideo
UdelaR	Montevideo

== Torneo Apertura ==
The Torneo Apertura (Opening Tournament) of Women's football third division started on 17 July 2022, competing in a round-robin format with a team being idle each gameweek due to the odd number of teams. La Luz City Park became the champion team of this half in the 6th game after winning against UdelaR and ending this tournament with 5 wins, 1 draw and no losses.

=== Standings ===
Pos	Team	Pld	W	D	L	GF	GA	GD	Pts
1	La Luz City Park	6	5	1	0	10	2	+8	16
2	Cerro	6	5	0	1	15	4	+11	15
3	Huracán Buceo	6	3	1	2	18	9	+9	10
4	Cerrito	6	2	2	2	21	11	+10	8
5	UdelaR	6	1	2	3	6	13	−7	5
6	Keguay	6	1	0	5	6	22	−16	3
7	Paso de la Arena	6	0	2	4	4	19	−15	2

Source: Uruguayan Football Association

=== Fixture ===
1st week

17 July 2022
18:30

Cerrito	4–4	Huracán Buceo

Complejo Juventud Melilla, Montevideo

20 July 2022
20:30

Paso de la Arena	0–2	Cerro

Parque Keguay, Toledo

21 July 2022
18:00

La Luz	3–1	Keguay

Parque Keguay, Toledo

Free: UdelaR.

2nd week

23 July 2022
21:00

UdelaR	1–1	Paso de la Arena

Estadio Charrúa, Montevideo

24 July 2022
17:00

Cerrito	0–2	La Luz

Complejo Juventud Melilla, Montevideo

24 July 2022
20:30

Cerro	3–1	Keguay

Estadio Charrúa, Montevideo

Free: Huracán Buceo.

3rd week

31 July 2022
15:30

Keguay	3–2	Paso de la Arena

Estadio Charrúa, Montevideo

3 August 2022
19:00

La Luz	2–1	Cerro

Complejo Juventud Melilla, Montevideo

4 August 2022
21:00

UdelaR	0–4	Huracán Buceo

Complejo Libertad Washington, Montevideo

Free: Cerrito.

4th week

7 August 2022
15:30

Cerro	3–0	Huracán Buceo

Estadio Charrúa, Montevideo

7 August 2022
18:00

Paso de la Arena	0–0	La Luz

Estadio Charrúa, Montevideo

7 August 2022
20:30

Cerrito	2–2	UdelaR

Estadio Charrúa, Montevideo

Free: Keguay.

5th week

13 August 2022
15:00

Keguay	1–5	Cerrito

Parque Keguay, Toledo

14 August 2022
15:00

Huracán Buceo	4–1	Paso de la Arena

Parque Huracán Buceo, Montevideo

14 August 2022
18:30

UdelaR	0–4	Cerro

Estadio Charrúa, Montevideo

Free: La Luz City Park.

6th week

21 August 2022
13:00

Cerrito	1–2	Cerro

Estadio Charrúa, Montevideo

21 August 2022
14:00

La Luz	1–0	Huracán Buceo

Complejo Juventud Melilla, Montevideo

21 August 2022
21:00

Keguay	0–3	UdelaR

Estadio Charrúa, Montevideo

Free: Paso de la Arena.

7th week

28 August 2022
16:00

UdelaR	0–2	La Luz

Estadio Charrúa, Montevideo

31 August 2022
19:00

Cerrito	9–0	Paso de la Arena

Complejo Libertad Washington, Montevideo
Referee: Nicolás Salinas

4 September 2022
16:00

Huracán Buceo	6–0	Keguay

Complejo Juventud Melilla, Montevideo

Free: Cerro.

== Torneo Clausura ==
The Torneo Clausura (Closing Tournament) began on 11 September 2022.

=== Standings ===
Pos	Team	Pld	W	D	L	GF	GA	GD	Pts
1	UdelaR	5	4	1	0	11	4	+7	13
2	La Luz City Park	5	3	2	0	6	2	+4	11
3	Cerro	6	3	1	2	10	6	+4	10
4	Huracán Buceo	5	2	2	1	9	6	+3	8
5	Cerrito	5	1	2	2	11	8	+3	5
6	Paso de la Arena	5	1	0	4	7	8	−1	3
7	Keguay	5	0	0	5	0	20	−20	0

Updated to match(es) played on 23 October 2022. Source: Uruguayan Football Association

=== Fixture ===
1st week

11 September 2022
15:30

Huracán Buceo	3–3	Cerrito

Parque Huracán Buceo, Montevideo

11 September 2022
16:30

Keguay	0–2	La Luz City Park

Parque Keguay, Toledo

11 September 2022
19:00

Cerro	3–0	Paso de la Arena

Estadio Charrúa, Montevideo

Free: UdelaR.

2nd week

17 September 2022
16:30

Keguay	0–3	Cerro

Parque Keguay, Toledo

17 September 2022
21:00

Paso de la Arena	1–2	UdelaR

Estadio Charrúa, Montevideo

18 September 2022
15:30

La Luz City Park	1–1	Cerrito

Complejo Juventud Melilla, Montevideo

Free: Huracán Buceo.

3rd week

24 September 2022
18:31

Paso de la Arena	5–0	Keguay

Estadio Charrúa, Montevideo

25 September 2022
15:30

Huracán Buceo	1–1	UdelaR

Complejo Huracán, Montevideo

25 September 2022
20:30

Cerro	1–1	La Luz City Park

Estadio Charrúa, Montevideo

Free: Cerrito.

4th week

2 October 2022
14:15

La Luz City Park	1–0	Paso de la Arena

Complejo Rentistas, Montevideo

2 October 2022
15:30

Huracán Buceo	3–0	Cerro

Complejo Huracán, Montevideo

2 October 2022
16:00

UdelaR	2–1	Cerrito

Complejo "La Familia", Montevideo

Free: Keguay.

5th week

9 October 2022
15:00

Paso de la Arena	1–2	Huracán Buceo

Complejo Deportivo Parque del Plata, Parque del Plata

9 October 2022
16:00

Cerrito	6–0	Keguay

Parque Maracaná, Montevideo

9 October 2022
16:30

Cerro	1–2	UdelaR

Complejo Deportivo Villa Teresa, Montevideo

Free: La Luz City Park.

6th week

16 October 2022
10:00

UdelaR	4–0	Keguay

Parque Keguay, Toledo

16 October 2022
15:30

Huracán Buceo	0–1	La Luz City Park

Parque Huracán Buceo, Montevideo

16 October 2022
16:00

Cerro	2–0	Cerrito

Complejo Deportivo Villa Teresa, Montevideo

Free: Paso de la Arena.

7th week

22 October 2022
16:00

La Luz City Park	v	UdelaR

Complejo Rentistas, Montevideo

22 October 2022
16:00

Keguay	v	Huracán Buceo

Parque Keguay, Toledo

23 October 2022
16:30

Paso de la Arena	v	Cerrito

Complejo Libertad Washington, Montevideo

Free: Cerro.
