= 1841 in Uruguay =

- Decades: 1820s; 1830s; 1840s; 1850s; 1860s
- See also: Other events of 1841; Timeline of Uruguayan history

Events in the year 1841 in Uruguay.

== Incumbents ==
=== Executive branch ===
- President: Fructuoso Rivera.
- Minister of Government and Foreign Relations: Francisco Antonino Vidal Gosende.
- Minister of Finance: Alejandro Chucarro, later José de Béjar.
- Minister of War and Navy: Enrique Santiago del Carmen.

=== Legislative branch ===
- President of the Senate: Joaquín Suárez.
- President of the Chamber of Deputies: Julián Álvarez.

== Events ==
- 11 February – Uruguayan Civil War: The right of prize was decreed as a "good prize" to seize every Argentine ship with credentials of the Governor of Buenos Aires along with its cargo, that were navigating in Uruguay, Paraná and de la Plata rivers, and later those from high seas, except for ships coming from Corrientes province.
- 27 November – The execution of a national census was ordered.

== Births ==
- 9 January - Julio Herrera y Obes, Uruguayan politician, lawyer and journalist, also President of Uruguay in the 1890–1894 term (d. 1912).
- 3 February - Conrado Villegas, Argentine military officer born in Uruguay (d. 1884).
- 4 February - Jacobo Varela, Uruguayan educator and politician, also served as Minister of Finance in 1889-1890 (d. 1900).

== Deaths ==
- 11 August: Jacinto Ventura de Molina, writer (b. 1766).
- 30 August: Luis Eduardo Pérez, politician, Governor of the Eastern Province in 1827–1828, Provisional Governor of Uruguay in 1828 and Interim President in early 1830 (b. 1774).
- 29 September: Adolfo Berro, Uruguayan poet (b. 1819).
