= 2022 Montevideo flood =

Natural disaster in Uruguay

- Date: 17 January 2022
- Location: Uruguay
- Type: flooding
- Deaths: 0
- Injuries: 0

On the morning of the Monday 17th of January 2022, Montevideo, the capital of Uruguay, and its neighbouring department, department of Canelones, went through a period of heavy rain that developed into a flood that submerged a number of neighbourhoods of the city underwater. The previous weekend, the country had experienced the highest heatwave in its recorded history. The rainfall that ensued that Monday was measured to add up to between 50 and 100 millilitres of rain, the bulk of it being in the period between 5:00 AM and 7:00 AM. The neighbouring department of Canelones also received similar amounts. 17,000 houses suffered power outages in the capital, and more than 11,000 in the neighbouring departments. Massive amounts of rain were also recorded elsewhere in the country, both towards the west and east of the capital, as well as up north. City authorities labelled the flood as "unprecedented" in its history. The mayor of one of the municipalities called the situation "critical", and added that "especially for poorer neighbourhoods it has hit really hard". Around 200 calls were made to the local firefighting departments, 138 of which were for evacuation assistance purposes. Videos of cars and garbage units floating on the city's streets were also widely shared in social media and on different platforms and websites.

== Political reactions ==
The flood also brought political in-fighting between various sectors of the political spectrum in the country, which were already tense because of different social issues, including reforms concerning the country's education and social security. While the country's executive branch is under the rule of one party, its capital is currently run by an administration led by its opposition, leading to an environment of heavy politicization of events occurring therein.
