= 2010 in Uruguay =

- Decades: 1990s; 2000s; 2010s; 2020s; 2030s
- See also: Other events of 2010; Timeline of Uruguayan history

The following lists events that happened during 2010 in Uruguay.

== Incumbents ==
- President: Tabaré Vázquez (until March 1), José Mujica (starting March 1)
- Vice President: Rodolfo Nin Novoa (until March 1), Danilo Astori (starting March 1)

== Events ==
=== February ===
- February 19 – the court case Philip Morris v. Uruguay begins.

=== May ===
- May 9 – 2010 Uruguayan municipal elections
