= 1871 in Uruguay =

- Decades: 1850s; 1860s; 1870s; 1880s; 1890s
- See also: Other events of 1871; Timeline of Uruguayan history

Events in the year 1871 in Uruguay.

== Incumbents ==
Executive Branch

- President: Lorenzo Batlle y Grau
- Minister of Government: José Cándido Bustamante.
- Minister of Foreign Relations: Manuel Herrera y Obes.
- Minister of Finance: Duncan Stewart.
- Minister of War and Navy: Trifón Ordónez.

Legislative Branch

- President of the Senate: Tomás Gomensoro Albín.
- President of the Chamber of Representatives: Juan Francisco Rodríguez.

== Events ==
- 17 January - General Assembly approved an amnesty to every individual who until that moment took part of the armed uprising and after that deserted the rebel forces and appear before the authorities. This amnesty excuses them of any offences due to being part of the rebel forces, they were promised not being prosecuted for their actions or previous opinions, and they could make use of their civilian and political rights again, along with their warranties to that rights, and in the case of military officers of the Army, they would be restored with the rank they reached up to the time they were discharged.
- 1 May - the Rural Association of Uruguay, first union of rural producers in the country, was established.
- 17 July - Battle of Manantiales.

== Deaths ==
- Fernando Quijano

== See also ==
- Revolution of the Lances
