= 2021 in Uruguay =

- Decades: 2000s; 2010s; 2020s; 2030s
- See also: Other events of 2021; Timeline of Uruguayan history

Events in the year 2021 in Uruguay.

== Incumbents ==
- President: Luis Lacalle Pou
- Vice President: Beatriz Argimón

== Events ==
Ongoing — COVID-19 pandemic in Uruguay

- February 26 – 192,000 doses of CoronaVac arrive from China. Innuculations of teachers, police officers, firefighters, active duty military personnel, and employees of the Instituto del Niño y Adolescente del Uruguay (INAU) will begin on March 1.
- March 25 – An Air Force helicopter carrying Pfizer–BioNTech COVID-19 vaccine en route to Rocha Department catches fire upon landing. The crew are taken to hospital and the cargo, destined for senior citizens (80+) is a total loss.

== Scheduled events ==
- March 8-April 26 — 460,000 doses of Pfizer–BioNTech COVID-19 vaccine are scheduled for distribution among health workers.
- March 15 — 1,558,000 of CoronaVac are expected to arrive.

== Deaths ==
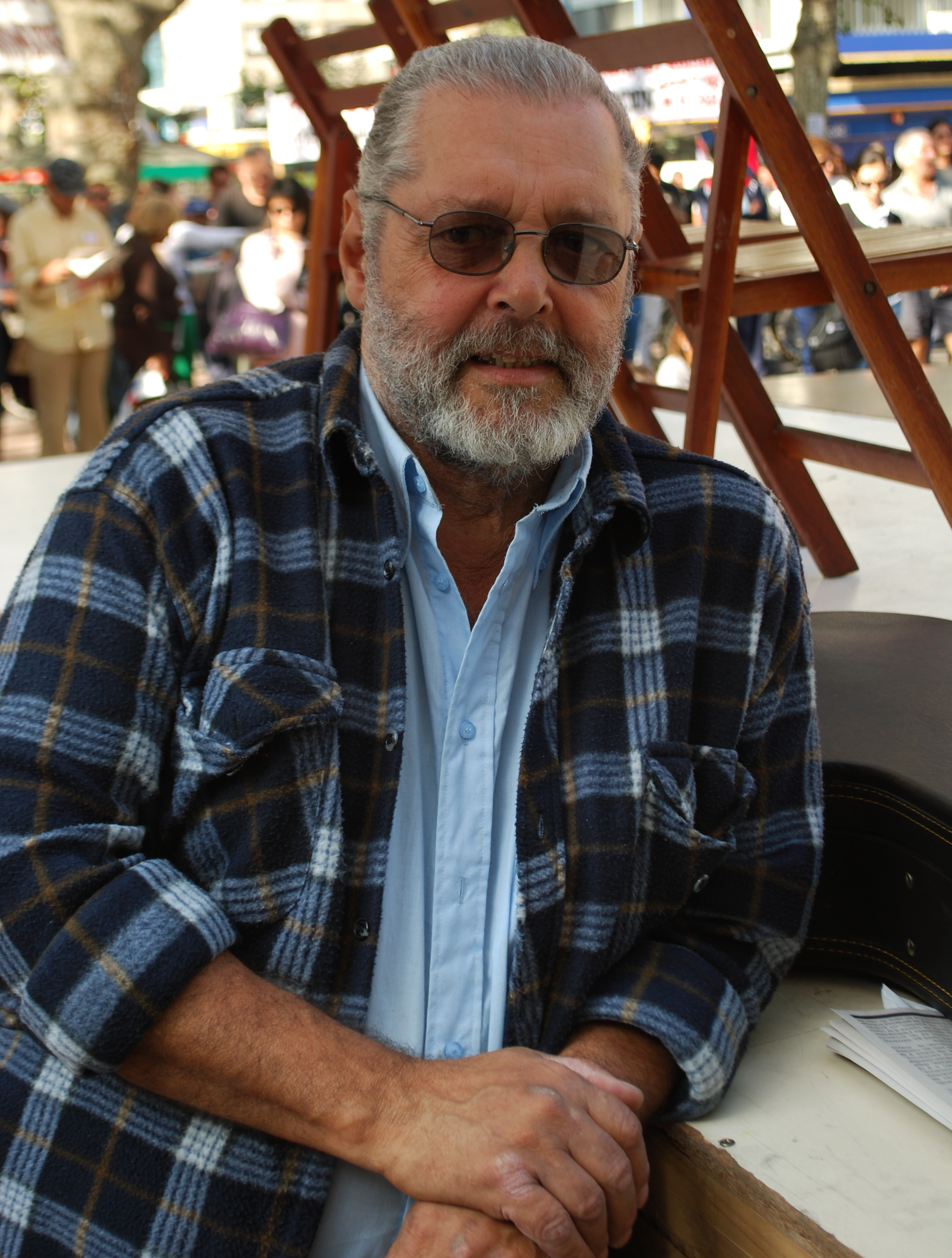
Yamandú Palacios

- 6 January – Yamandú Palacios, singer, songwriter and guitarist (born 1940).
- 11 January – Walter Taibo, footballer (born 1931).
- 6 February – Santiago García, 30, footballer (Nacional, River Plate-UY, Godoy Cruz); suicide by gunshot. (body discovered on this date)
- 23 February – Juan Masnik, 77, football player (Club Nacional de Football, Uruguay national football team) and manager (Atlético Marte).
- 6 March – Franco Acosta, 25, footballer (Fénix, Villarreal B, Plaza Colonia); drowned.
- 12 March
  - Andrés Abt, 47, politician, deputy (2020); COVID-19.
  - Uruguay Graffigna, 73, Uruguayan-Chilean footballer (San Luis de Quillota, Los Angeles Aztecs, PEC Zwolle); complications from COVID-19 and Alzheimer's disease.
- 25 March – Alberto Sonsol, 63, sports journalist and TV presenter; COVID-19.
- 9 April – Eduardo Malaquina, 84, politician, intendant of Salto (1985–1990, 1995–2005) and senator (2011–2015).
- 28 August - Pablo Dabezies, 81, priest and theologian.
