= 1866 in Uruguay =

- Decades: 1840s; 1850s; 1860s; 1870s; 1880s
- See also: Other events of 1866; Timeline of Uruguayan history

Events in the year 1866 in Uruguay.

== Incumbents ==
- President: Venancio Flores

== Events ==
- May 2 - Paraguayan War: Battle of Estero Bellaco
- July 18 - Battle of Boquerón (1866)
- September 8 - establishment of Nuestra Señora del Carmen, Aguada, Montevideo
- September 22 - Battle of Curupayty

== Deaths ==
- July 18 - León de Pallejas, Spanish-born general, killed in action
