= 2015 in Uruguay =

- Decades: 1990s; 2000s; 2010s; 2020s; 2030s
- See also: Other events of 2015; Timeline of Uruguayan history

The following lists events that happened during 2015 in Uruguay.

== Incumbents ==
- President: Jose Mujica (until March 1), Tabaré Vázquez (starting March 1)
- Vice President: Danilo Astori (until March 1), Raúl Fernando Sendic (starting March 1)

== Events ==
=== May ===
- May 10 – 2015 Uruguayan municipal elections
