= Jorge Sanguinetti =

Uruguayan political figure

Jorge Sanguinetti (November 14, 1934 – January 5, 2017) was a Uruguayan political figure.

== Background ==
For many years, he was associated with local political affairs in Colonia Department. He is a member of the Colorado Party (Uruguay), and during the 1970s was a leading party activist.

== Minister of Transport and Public Works ==
In 1985, Jorge Sanguinetti's cousin, Julio María Sanguinetti took office as President of Uruguay, and the latter appointed the former to the post of Minister of Transport and Public Works. Jorge Sanguinetti served in that post until 1989.

== Later career ==
=== President of ANCAP ===
Sanguinetti later served as President of the Uruguayan petroleum company ANCAP. He was noted for his support for that company's privatization.

=== Support for Pedro Bordaberry Herrán from 2007 ===
In 2007, Sanguinetti became a supporter of Pedro Bordaberry Herrán's Vamos Uruguay grouping within the Colorado Party (Uruguay). In doing so, he joined a number of other prominent 'Colorados'.

== See also ==
- Politics of Uruguay
- Pedro Bordaberry#2009 Uruguayan Presidential elections
- List of political families#Uruguay
