= 2018 in Uruguay =

- Decades: 1990s; 2000s; 2010s; 2020s; 2030s
- See also: Other events of 2018; Timeline of Uruguayan history

Events in the year 2018 in Uruguay.

== Incumbents ==
- President: Tabaré Vázquez
- Vice President: Lucía Topolansky

== Events ==
- July — Uruguay becomes the first country to legally produce and sell Marajuana for recreational use.

== Deaths ==
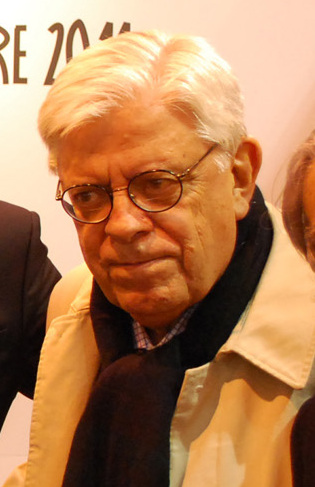
Hermenegildo Sábat

- 30 April – Elisa Izaurralde, biochemist and molecular biologist (b. 1959).
- 12 July – José Omar Verdún, footballer (b. 1945).
- 2 October – Hermenegildo Sábat, journalist and comic book artist (b. 1933).
