= 1868 in Uruguay =

- Decades: 1840s; 1850s; 1860s; 1870s; 1880s
- See also: Other events of 1868; Timeline of Uruguayan history

Events in the year 1868 in Uruguay.

== Incumbents ==
- Interim Governor: Venancio Flores until February 15. Acting president from the Senate: Pedro Varela until 1 March. President: Lorenzo Batlle since 1 March.

== Events ==
- Establishment of Cementerio del Cerro, Montevideo.
- 23 January - the first Uruguayan Civil Code is passed, approved by Law No. 917 of 23 January 1868, and was scheduled to come into force in 19 April of the same year.
- 4 February - the first Uruguayan Mining Code is passed, approved by Law No. 920 of 4 February 1868.
- 30 April - the parliament gave legal approval to the regulations with purported force of law issued by the Interim Governorship led by general Venancio Flores, from 20 February 1865 to 15 February 1868.
- 20 July - due to the death of Venancio Flores, the General Assembly declared a day of national mourning his day of death in 19 February 1869 and that day yearly. This would be held until 1914, when all the holidays of mournings were repealed.

== Deaths ==
- February 19
  - Bernardo Berro (64), Uruguayan politician and writer, president of Uruguay in the period 1860-1864; assassinated (b. 1803).
  - Venancio Flores (59), Uruguayan politician and military figure, president of Uruguay in the period 1853-1855 and interim governor in the period 1865-1868; assassinated (b. 1808).
