= 1992 Uruguayan privatisation referendum =

13 December 1992
- [_] I vote YES to the referendum appeal against Articles 1, 2, 3, 10 and 32 of Law No. 16,211. [_] I vote NO to the referendum appeal against Articles 1, 2, 3, 10 and 32 of Law No. 16,211.

Results
Choice	Votes	%
Yes	1,293,016	72.55%
No	489,302	27.45%
Valid votes	1,782,318	91.79%
Invalid or blank votes	159,500	8.21%
Total votes	1,941,818	100.00%
Registered voters/turnout	2,345,077	82.8%

A referendum on partially repealing the law on public enterprises was held in Uruguay on 13 December 1992. The proposed repeal was approved by 73% of voters.

== Background ==
On 10 January 1991 the General Assembly passed law 16,211 (Law on Public Enterprises), which allowed for the privatisation of several state enterprises, including the ANTEL telecommunications company and the ANCAP petroleum company.

Two attempts were made to gain enough support to force a referendum, with a quorum of 25% of registered voters required - equivalent to 589,823 voters. The first attempt gained 448,265 in favour for a partial repeal and 21,473 for a full repeal. The second effort obtained 693,668 for a partial repeal and 14,960 for a full repeal. On 15 October 1992 the Electoral Court decided on a referendum on a partial repeal.

== Results ==
Choice	Votes	%
For	1,293,016	72.55
Against	489,302	27.45
Unevaluated votes	100,191	–
Invalid/blank votes	59,309	–
Total	1,941,829	100
Registered voters/turnout	2,345,077	82.80
Source: Direct Democracy

Unevaluated votes were those cast by voters outside of their local polling station. They would have been examined after a court had decided on their validity, but as the result was already clear, they were not counted.
