= 1897 in Uruguay =

- Decades: 1870s; 1880s; 1890s; 1900s; 1910s
- See also: Other events of 1897; Timeline of Uruguayan history

Events in the year 1897 in Uruguay.

== Incumbents ==
- President: Juan Idiarte Borda until August 25, Juan Lindolfo Cuestas
- Revolution of 1897: Blanco forces led by Aparicio Saravia stages an insurrection against the incumbent Colorado Party.

== Deaths ==
- August 25 - Juan Idiarte Borda, President, assassinated
