= Juan Justo Amaro =

Uruguayan politician (1930–2020)

Juan Justo Amaro (14 September 1930 – 20 May 2020) was an Uruguayan politician.

== Biography ==
Justo was born on 14 September 1930 in Florida, Uruguay. He was the editor of the publications Principios and Progreso. Justo worked for the State Railways Administration of Uruguay from 1945 to 1962. In 1962, he won a seat on the council of Florida Department. He served until 1965, when he accepted an appointment as director of UTE. Two years later, Justo was named director of ANCAP.

Affiliated with the Colorado Party, Justo was elected to the Chamber of Representatives in 1971. He served until 1973, when Juan María Bordaberry closed parliament and consolidated power in a coup d'état. Upon the restoration of democracy in 1985, Justo returned to the Chamber of Representatives, where he served for two consecutive terms until 1994. Between 1995 and 2000, Justo was Intendant of Florida Department. Subsequently, Justo was appointed president of Obras Sanitarias del Estado. He stepped down in 2003, and declared his candidacy in the 2004 Uruguayan general election. From 2005 to 2010, Justo sat on the Chamber of Senators.

Justo died on 20 May 2020.
