= Rodolfo González Rissotto =

Uruguayan politician (1949–2020)

Rodolfo González Rissotto (October 7, 1949 – March 28, 2020) was a Uruguayan professor, historian and politician affiliated with the National Party.

During the presidency of Luis Alberto Lacalle, he was the Director of Education at the Ministry of Education and Culture. Near the end of the term, in February 1995, he briefly held the title of Minister of National Defense.

From 1996 through 2010, he was Minister at Uruguay's Electoral Court.

He wrote a book, Women and Politics in Uruguay. He also did work in electoral theory. His work included "Direct Democracy: The Case of Uruguay," which examines the referendum as a political instrument.

He died in March 2020 of COVID-19, becoming Uruguay's first death in the pandemic.
