= Inter-American Institute for Global Change Research =

The Inter-American Institute for Global Change Research (IAI) is an intergovernmental organization supported by 19 countries in the Americas, dedicated to pursuing the principles of scientific excellence, international cooperation, and the full and open exchange of scientific information to increase the understanding of global change phenomena (planetary-scale changes in the Earth system) and their socio-economic implications.

Recognizing the need to better understand the natural and social processes which drive large scale environmental change, the IAI encourages interactive exchanges between scientists and policy makers. The goal of the IAI is to augment scientific capacity in the region and to provide information to policy makers in a useful and timely manner. Its primary objective is to encourage research beyond the scope of national programs, by advancing comparative and focused studies based on scientific issues that are important to the region as a whole.

In January 2026, United States President Donald Trump announced that the United States would withdraw from the organization.

== Background ==
As evidenced by the participation of most of the world's leaders in the United Nations Conference on Environment and Development (UNCED) in Rio de Janeiro, Brazil, June 1992, the phenomenon of global change was perceived as one of the most critical challenges facing the world today. Physical and socio-economic evidence of global change related phenomena such as ozone depletion, loss of biological diversity and changes in rainfall patterns and intensity, can be found in all areas of the world. Regardless of whether the particular phenomenon is natural or human-induced, its effects often cross geopolitical borders. Thus, many environmental issues must be addressed scientifically as global or regional problems, with steps towards mitigation or alleviation taken at a national level.

== History ==
In response to the plea of a regional approach entity to address global change issues, sixteen nations in the Americas signed the Agreement establishing the Inter-American Institute for Global Change Research on May 13, 1992, in Montevideo, Uruguay. The treaty has been ratified by all 16 signatories and has been acceded to by three other American nations. The agreement came into force on March 12, 1994, thus creating the IAI.

To accomplish IAI's mission and goals, in 1993 contributing scientists and science managers of the region crafted an initial Science Agenda. In 1997, in response to the evolving regional priorities, the IAI Scientific Advisory Committee revised the initial Science Agenda, re-arranged it and included new pressing issues in the current IAI Science Agenda.

Each member country participating in the IAI benefits from the enhancement of regional relationships, the establishment of new institutional arrangements, open exchange of scientific data, and information generated by the institute's research programs, and the implementation of IAI Training and Education Programs.

The United States National Science Foundation hosted the first IAI Secretariat from September 1994 until September 1996. Currently, the IAI Directorate is located in the City of Knowledge in Clayton, Panama.
