= 2025 in Uruguay =

- Decades: 2000s; 2010s; 2020s; 2030s
- See also: Other events of 2025; Timeline of Uruguayan history

Events in the year 2025 in Uruguay.

== Incumbents ==
- President: Luis Lacalle Pou (until 1 March); Yamandú Orsi (starting 1 March)
- Vice President: Beatriz Argimón (until 1 March); Carolina Cosse (starting 1 March)

== Events ==
- 1 March – Yamandú Orsi is inaugurated as President.
- 23 June – A polar front originating from Antarctica hits Uruguay, causing seven deaths and prompting the declaration of a state of emergency.
- 13 August – The Chamber of Representatives votes 64–35 in favor of legalizing euthanasia, allowing mentally competent adults with terminal or incurable illnesses to request assisted dying.
- 4 September – Uruguay qualifies for the 2026 FIFA World Cup after defeating Peru 3-0 at the 2026 FIFA World Cup qualification at the Estadio Centenario in Montevideo.
- 16 September – Uruguay, as a member of Mercosur, signs a free trade agreement with Iceland, Liechtenstein, Norway and Switzerland.

=== Elections ===
- 12 May – 2025 Uruguayan municipal elections

== Deaths ==
- 4 January: Mathías Acuña, 32, footballer (Lamia),
- 10 January: Nelson Silva Pacheco, 80, Uruguayan-born Colombian footballer (Sportivo Italiano, Tigre, Colombia national team).
- 3 April: Juan Andrés Ramírez (77), lawyer and politician.
- 13 May: José Mujica, 89, revolutionary and politician, president (2010–2015), minister of livestock (2005–2008), and four-time MP.
- 22 May: Hugo Fernández Faingold, 78, vice president (1998–2000).
- 23 October: Juan Carlos Moreno Poggio, 43, agricultural technician and politician, deputy (2020–2025), cancer.
