= 2024 in Uruguay =

- Decades: 2000s; 2010s; 2020s; 2030s
- See also: Other events of 2024; Timeline of Uruguayan history

Events in the year 2024 in Uruguay.

== Incumbents ==
- President: Luis Lacalle Pou
- Vice President: Beatriz Argimón

== Events ==
- 7 July – A fire at a nursing home in Treinta y Tres kills 10 people.
- 13 July – Uruguay finishes at third place in the 2024 Copa America tournament following a 2-2 draw against Canada in Charlotte, North Carolina.
- 16 September – Two people are convicted and sentenced to up to two years' imprisonment for smuggling cow gallstones worth $3 million into Hong Kong.

=== Elections ===
- 30 June – 2024 Uruguayan presidential primaries: Voters elect the presidential candidates for all political parties that are running in the general election on 27 October.
- 27 October –
  - 2024 Uruguayan general election: Voters elect the President, Vice President, Senate and Representatives, with Yamandú Orsi of the Broad Front and Álvaro Delgado of the Coalición Multicolor advancing towards a runoff for the presidency.
  - 2024 Uruguayan constitutional referendum: Voters reject two proposals to implement reforms in the social security system that would lower the retirement age, increase payouts and transfer privately managed savings to a state-run trust, and allow nighttime police raids in homes.
- 24 November – Second round in the presidential election. Yamandú Orsi is elected president.

== Deaths ==
- 4 April – Adrián Peña, 48, businessman and politician
- 7 July – Josefina Herrán, 94, former First Lady 1972-1976
- 15 July – Juan Ricardo Faccio, 87, former football player and manager
- 29 August – Ricardo Pascale, 81, economist and sculptor

== Holidays ==
- 1 January – New Year's Day
- 6 January – Epiphany
- 12–13 February – Carnival
- 28 March – Maundy Thursday
- 29 March – Good Friday
- 19 April – Landing of the 33 Patriots Day
- 1 May – Labour Day
- 18 May – Battle of Las Piedras
- 19 June – Birth of Artigas
- 18 July – Constitution Day
- 25 August – Independence Day
- 12 October – Day of the Race
- 2 November – All Souls' Day
- 25 December – Christmas Day

== Art and entertainment ==
- List of Uruguayan submissions for the Academy Award for Best International Feature Film
