= Landing of the 33 Patriots Day =

Observance in Uruguay

- Observed by: Uruguay
- Date: 19 April
- Next time: 19 April 2026
- Frequency: annual

19 April is the anniversary of the Landing of the 33 Patriots in Uruguay, also known as the Thirty-Three Orientals, called "Orientals" because Uruguay was known as the Banda Oriental, or the "Eastern Bank" of the Río de la Plata, the western shore being Argentina.

In a span of less than ten years—1807 to 1816—the Banda Oriental and its capital city of Montevideo were occupied by the English, retaken by the Spanish, and invaded by the Portuguese.

In 1816, Portuguese Brazil took Banda Oriental from the north, ousting the province's hero José Gervasio Artigas in 1820 and forcing him into exile in Paraguay. Banda Oriental became a province of Brazil, which achieved independence from Portugal in 1822.

In 1825 a group of exiled Uruguayan fighters called the 33 Orientals returned from Buenos Aires. They were led by Juan Antonio Lavalleja, who had fought with the exiled Artigas. The 33 Orientals secretly crossed the Plata River, landing on the Eastern Bank on 19 April. There they planted what would be known as the flag of the 33 Orientals and took an oath to kick the Brazilian government out of Uruguay.

Four months later, on 25 August 1825, Uruguay officially declared its independence from Brazil. After 500 days of fighting (the Argentina–Brazil War), Brazil recognized Uruguay's independence in 1828.

Celebrations held on this date correspond with celebrations held on their National Independence day, with the laying of wreaths, speeches, and particularly special prayer programs held in churches all over Uruguay, recognizing the 33 brave men who had sparked the revolution towards their independence.
