= List of ministries of Uruguay =

This is a list of ministries of the Government of Uruguay.

Ministry name		Created
English	Spanish	Created
Ministry of National Defense	Ministerio de Defensa Nacional	December 22, 1828
Ministry of Social Development	Ministerio de Desarrollo Social	March 21, 2005
Ministry of Economy and Finance	Ministerio de Economía y Finanzas	March 8, 1830
Ministry of Education and Culture	Ministerio de Educación y Cultura	February 26, 1848
Minister of Agriculture, Livestock, and Fishing	Ministerio de Ganadería, Agricultura y Pesca	March 19, 1935
Ministry of Industry, Energy and Mining	Ministerio de Industria, Energía y Minería	1907
Ministry of the Interior	Ministerio del Interior	December 22, 1828
Ministry of Foreign Relations	Ministerio de Relaciones Exteriores	December 22, 1828
Ministry of Public Health	Ministerio de Salud Pública	September 5, 1933
Ministry of Labour and Social Welfare	Ministerio de Trabajo y Seguridad Social	March 12, 1907
Ministry of Transport and Public Works	Ministerio de Transporte y Obras Públicas	March 2, 1891
Ministry of Tourism	Ministerio de Turismo	December 24, 1986
Ministry of Housing and Territorial Planning	Ministerio de Vivienda y Ordenamiento Territorial	May 30, 1990
Ministry of Environment	Ministerio de Ambiente	July 9, 2020

== See also ==
- Cabinet of Uruguay
