= List of ambassadors of Uruguay =

The following is a list of countries to which Uruguay has provided ambassadors, with their respective incumbents (in 2013).

Host country	Ambassador	Notes
Angola	Álvaro Enrique González Otero	Concurrent: Nigeria
Argentina	Guillermo Pomi	
Australia	Alberto Leopoldo Fajardo Klappenbach	Concurrent: Fiji, New Zealand, East Timor
Austria	Carlos Barros	Concurrent: Hungary, Slovakia
Belgium	Walter Cancela	Concurrent: Luxembourg
Bolivia	Carlos Flanagan	
Brazil	Carlos Amorín	
Canada	Elbio Rosselli	Concurrent: Iceland
Chile	Rodolfo Camarosano	
China	Mª del Rosario Portell	Concurrent: Macau
Colombia	Duncan Croci	
Costa Rica	Fernando Marr	
Cuba	Ariel Bergamino	Concurrent: Jamaica
Czech Republic	Diana Magdalena Espino	Concurrent: Slovenia, Turkey
Dominican Republic	Luis Alberto Carresse	Concurrent: Barbados
Ecuador	Enrique Delgado	
Egypt	Agustín Espinosa	Concurrent: Democratic Republic of the Congo, Ethiopia, Jordan, Libya
El Salvador	Mª Cristina Figueroa	Concurrent: Nicaragua
Finland	Pablo Emilio Sader Hernández	
France	Omar Mesa	Concurrent: Algeria, Monaco, Senegal
Germany	Alberto Guani Amarilla	
Greece		
Guatemala	Mª del Carmen Fros	Concurrent: Honduras
Holy See	Daniel Ramada	Concurrent: Order of Malta
India	César Ferrer	Concurrent: Bangladesh
Iran	Juan Carlos Ojeda	Concurrent: Pakistan
Israel	Abram Greiver	
Italy	Gustavo Álvarez Goyoaga	Concurrent: Croatia, Tunisia
Japan	Ana Mª Estévez	
Lebanon	Jorge Luis Jure	Concurrent: Cyprus, Syria
Malaysia	Gerardo Prato	Concurrent: Cambodia, Thailand
Mexico	Rodolfo Camarosano	Concurrent: Bahamas
Netherlands	Álvaro Moerzinger	
Panama	Francisco Purificatti	
Paraguay	Juan Enrique Fischer	
Peru	Juan José Arteaga	
Poland	Julio Giambruno	Concurrent: Belarus, Lithuania, Ukraine
Portugal	José Korzeniak	Concurrent: Morocco
Qatar	José Luis Remedi	Concurrent: Bahrain, Oman
Romania	Pedro Martín Mo Amaro	Concurrent: Bulgaria, Serbia
Russia	Jorge Alberto Meyer	Concurrent: Armenia, Kazakhstan
Saudi Arabia	Rodolfo Invernizzi	Concurrent: Iraq, Kuwait
South Africa	Luis Homero Bermúdez	Concurrent: Ghana
South Korea	Alba Florio	Concurrent: Philippines
Spain	Francisco Bustillo	Concurrent: Andorra
Sweden	Zulma Guelman	Concurrent: Denmark, Estonia, Latvia, Norway
Switzerland	Luis Ricardo Nario	Concurrent: Kenya, Liechtenstein
United Arab Emirates	Nelson Yemil Chabén	
United Kingdom	Néstor Moreira	Concurrent: Ireland
United States	Carlos Pita	
Venezuela	Óscar Ramos	Concurrent: Trinidad and Tobago
Vietnam	Carlos Mª Irigaray	Concurrent: Indonesia and Singapore
