= Cabinet of Uruguay =

The Council of Ministers (Spanish: Consejo de Ministros), colloquially referred to as the Cabinet of Ministers (Spanish: Gabinete de Ministros), is the main collective decision-making body of the Government of Uruguay. Convened and chaired by the President of the Republic, it is composed of the heads of the State ministries.

The members of the Cabinet, appointed by the president, take office on March 1, the same day as the presidential inauguration, and serve at the pleasure of the office.

== Meetings of the cabinet ==
Most cabinet meetings take place at the Executive Tower in Montevideo; however, they may also be held at the Suárez residence or at the Anchorena Presidential Estate in the Colonia Department.

== Composition ==
=== Legal framework ===
The composition of the Council of Ministers is established in Chapter II of Section IX of the Constitution of Uruguay. Composed of the ministers, it is presided over by the President of the Republic, who participates in deliberations and possesses a decisive vote in case of a tie, even if the tie results from their own vote. The Council convenes whenever deemed appropriate or upon request by one or more ministers to address issues related to their portfolios, and meetings must take place within twenty-four hours of a request or on the date specified in the convocation.

Sessions of the Council require the presence of a majority of its members, and decisions are made by an absolute majority of those present. Deliberations can be terminated at any time by the same majority, without discussion of the motion. All resolutions of the Council may be revoked by an absolute majority of its members, including those originally agreed upon between the President and the relevant minister(s) in a acuerdo de ministro. (Note: A “acuerdo de ministro” is the resolution or decision adopted by the President of the Republic together with one or more ministers, without the full Council of Ministers necessarily being involved.ts.)

=== Current Cabinet ===
Ministry	Incumbent	Since	Party
Presidency of the Republic	Yamandú Orsi	1 March 2025	Broad Front
Vice Presidency of the Republic	Carolina Cosse	1 March 2025	Broad Front
Secretariat of the Presidency	Alejandro Sánchez	1 March 2025	Broad Front
Deputy Secretariat of the Presidency	Jorge Díaz	1 March 2025	Broad Front
Office of Planning and Budget	Rodrigo Arim	1 March 2025	Broad Front
Ministry of Economy and Finance	Gabriel Oddone	1 March 2025	Broad Front
Ministry of Foreign Relations	Mario Lubetkin	1 March 2025	Broad Front
Ministry of Public Health	Cristina Lustemberg	1 March 2025	Broad Front
Ministry of the Interior	Carlos Negro	1 March 2025	Broad Front
Ministry of Education and Culture	José Carlos Mahía	1 March 2025	Broad Front
Ministry of National Defense	Sandra Lazo	1 March 2025	Broad Front
Ministry of Social Development	Gonzalo Civila	1 March 2025	Broad Front
Ministry of Livestock, Agriculture, and Fisheries	Alfredo Fratti	1 March 2025	Broad Front
Ministry of Industry, Energy and Mining	Fernanda Cardona	1 March 2025	Broad Front
Ministry of Transport and Public Works	Lucía Etcheverry	1 March 2025	Broad Front
Ministry of Housing and Territorial Planning	Tamara Paseyro	22 April 2025	Broad Front
Ministry of Labour and Social Welfare	Juan Castillo	1 March 2025	Broad Front
Ministry of Tourism	Pablo Menoni	1 March 2025	Broad Front
Ministry of Environment	Edgardo Ortuño	1 March 2025	Broad Front
