= Robert Bouvier =

Robert Bouvier may refer to:

- Robert Bouvier (Swiss philosopher) (1886–1978), Swiss philosopher
- Robert Bouvier Torterolo (born 1966), Uruguayan politician
