= Sara Mandiano =

- Born: Françoise Castellani; 25 January 1958 (age 68)
- Origin: France
- Genres: Pop music
- Occupations: Singer, songwriter
- Years active: 1985–present

Sara Mandiano (born 25 January 1958 as Françoise Castellani) is a French singer and songwriter. She is mainly known for her hit "J'ai des doutes" (1991).

== Musical career ==
In a ten-year career, she released three albums as a songwriter, composer and singer. She signed her first records under the name Sarah Mandiano until 1988, then as Sara Mandiano for the rest of her career. She appeared on many French TV shows in 1991, where she performed "J'ai des doutes" and "Défense d'y voir".

In 1992, she was nominated in the category of Popular music female revelation of the year at the Victoires de la Musique, but Jil Caplan won the prize.

In 1993, L'Affaire Louis Trio and she covered Serge Gainsbourg's song La Javanaise in Taratata, recorded on 7 September and broadcast on 11 September 1993 on France 2.

Today, as a voice teacher, she has worked on the musical Dracula or even composed jingles for TV channel Gulli or TEVA for example. She is now part of a group called Shaaks as a singer and composed out several titles listening on the net. In 2005 and 2007, she participated in vocals on albums Fragile and Banco des Têtes Raides. She is also manager of the Studios of the Seine, one of the largest sets of studio professional recordings.

== Discography ==
=== Albums ===
- Ombre chinoise (1985)

"Ombre chinoise" - "Une Nuit de cuir" - "En sursis" - "J'aime sa façon d'être un garçon" - "Porte des chambres" - "L'Anneau d'or" - "Shangai" - "Sans dessus dessous" - "Fin de l'hiver" - "Amour maléfique" - "Tu pleures tout ce que je bois"

- Point d'interrogation (1991)

"Les Serments" - "J'ai des doutes" - "Pirate et Coquillages" - "Soi disant" - "Ton Amour à la gomme" - "Défense d’y voir" - "Baby pop" - "Daddy" - "Je ne suis pas comme il faut" - "Nos Mots d’adieu"

- Saison des pluies (1993)

"Saison des pluies" - "Night and Day" - "Cool" - "Où sont mes guides" - "Le Cortège" - "Tombé du soleil" - "Play" - "Vertige céleste" - "Susurre-moi des mots" - "Mille et une raisons"

- Other songs :

"Pour toi moi je" - "Louxor" - "La Dame de Shangai" - "Venus et l'aquarium" - "Bandit" - "Ombre immobile" - "L'Avion en polyester" - "La Luna" - "Mensonge en Somalie"

=== Singles ===
With peak positions in French SNEP Singles Chart:

- "Ombre chinoise" (1984)
- "Pour toi moi je" (1985)
- "La Dame de Shanghai" (1986)
- "Venus et l’aquarium" (1988)
- "Ombre immobile" (1988)
- "J’ai des doutes" (1991) - #10, Silver disc
- "Défense d’y voir" (1992) - #37
- "Les Serments" (1991)
- "Saisons des pluies" (1993)
- "Cool" (1993)
- "Play" (1994)

=== As vocalist or lyricist ===
- À l'Envers à l'Endroit (Karen Chéryl) (1987)
- Mon Amant au hammam (Florence Weber) (1988)
- T'aurais pas vu l'amour (Patricia Zamler) (1988)
- Souviens-toi des mots (Patricia Zamler) (1989)
- Les Portes du ciel (Veronica Antico) (2002)
- Lettre ouverte (Paul Mahoni) (2002)
- Vole ta vie (Romane Serda) (2004)
- Je voudrais pas crever (Les Têtes Raides) (2005)
- Plus haut (Les Têtes Raides) (2007)
