= Omar Paganini =

Uruguayan electrical engineer, politician and professor

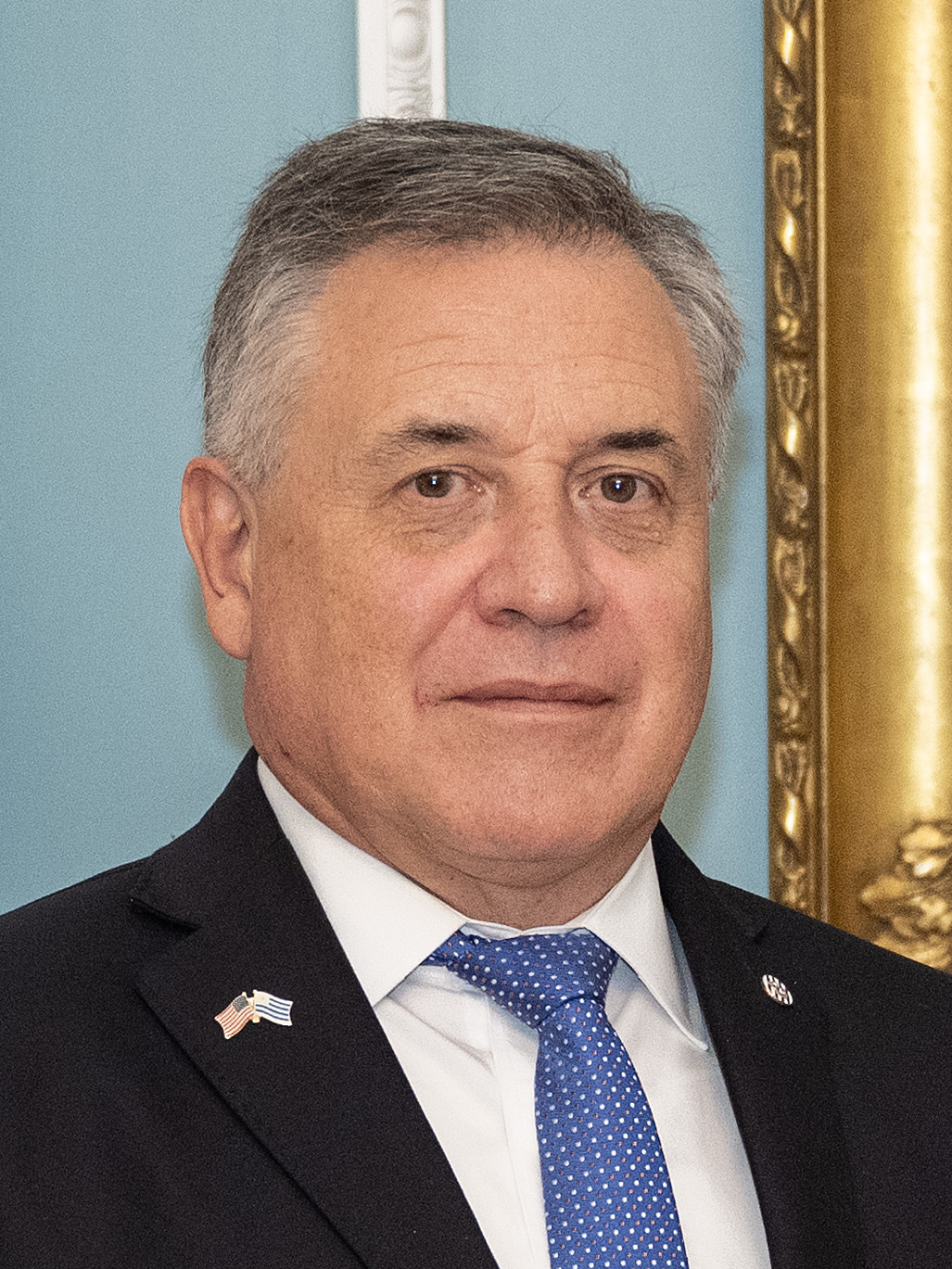
- Omar Paganini in 2024

Minister of Foreign Relations of Uruguay
- In office 6 November 2023 – 1 March 2025
- President: Luis Alberto Lacalle Pou
- Preceded by: Francisco Bustillo
- Succeeded by: Mario Lubetkin

Minister of Industry, Energy and Mining of Uruguay
- In office 1 March 2020 – 4 November 2023
- President: Luis Alberto Lacalle Pou
- Preceded by: Guillermo Moncecchi
- Succeeded by: Elisa Facio

Personal details
- Born: Omar Ignacio Paganini Herrera; 2 June 1962 (age 64) Montevideo, Uruguay
- Party: National Party
- Education: University of the Republic; Catholic University of Uruguay
- Occupation: Electrical engineer; academic; politician

Omar Ignacio Paganini Herrera (born 2 June 1962) is an Uruguayan electrical engineer, academic and politician of the National Party, serving as Minister of Foreign Relations from 6 November 2023 to 1 March 2025 under president Luis Lacalle Pou. Previously, he served as Minister of Industry, Energy and Mining from March 2020 to November 2023.

Graduated from the University of the Republic with a degree in Electrical Engineering, Paganini obtained a Master of Business Administration from the Catholic University of Uruguay. He also trained in Entrepreneurship at Stanford University and the University of California, Berkeley, and in Negotiation by the Global PON program at Harvard University.

== Career ==
In 1990 he founded an engineering and automation services company for the industry and in 1995 he settled in the department of Paysandú to take over as director of the company Paylana S.A. From 2001 to 2003, back in Montevideo, he joined Antel's ITC consultancy.

In 2003, he was appointed dean of the Faculty of Engineering of the Catholic University of Uruguay (UCU), a position he held until 2012. Later, he served as vice-rector for Economic Management and Development and in 2018 he became head of the UCU Business School. In addition, he directed the Observatory of Energy and Sustainable Development of that university, through which he has made publications and presentations in the country and in foreign universities, mainly, on the change of the energy matrix.

== Minister of Industry ==
Paganini was announced as Minister of Industry, Energy and Mining on December 16, 2019, by then-President-elect Luis Lacalle Pou. He took office on March 1, 2020, stating that his portfolio should be "a channel for Uruguay to take advantage of its opportunities and face its challenges." He also pointed out that the country's competitiveness is the main challenge of his management. He was succeeded by Elisa Facio.

== Minister of Foreign Relations ==
On November 4, 2023, in the midst of a cabinet reshuffle, President Luis Lacalle Pou announced that Paganini would succeed Francisco Bustillo as foreign minister.
