= Marie Jaisson =

French sociologist

Marie Jaisson is a sociologist studying the sociology of medical practices and of biological phenomena, and the history of Sociology. After a Ph.D. in sociology at EHESS (Paris), she was junior professor at the [University of Tours] and she is full professor at the University Sorbonne Paris-Nord (France).

== Main publications ==
- Le Sexisme de la première heure. Hasard et sociologie, with Eric Brian. Paris, Raisons d'agir, 2007.
- The Descent of Human Sex Ratio at Birth. A Dialogue between Mathematics, Biology and Sociology, with Eric Brian. Dordrecht, Springer Verlag, 2007.
- Maurice Halbwachs, sociologue retrouvé, ed. with Christian Baudelot. Paris, éditions Rue d’Ulm, 2007.
- [Maurice Halbwachs] et coll., Le Point de vue du nombre (1936), ed. with Eric Brian. Paris, Ined, 2005.
- Médecines, patients et politiques de santé, Special issue of Actes de la recherche en sciences sociales, n. 143, June 2002.
