= Elisa Facio =

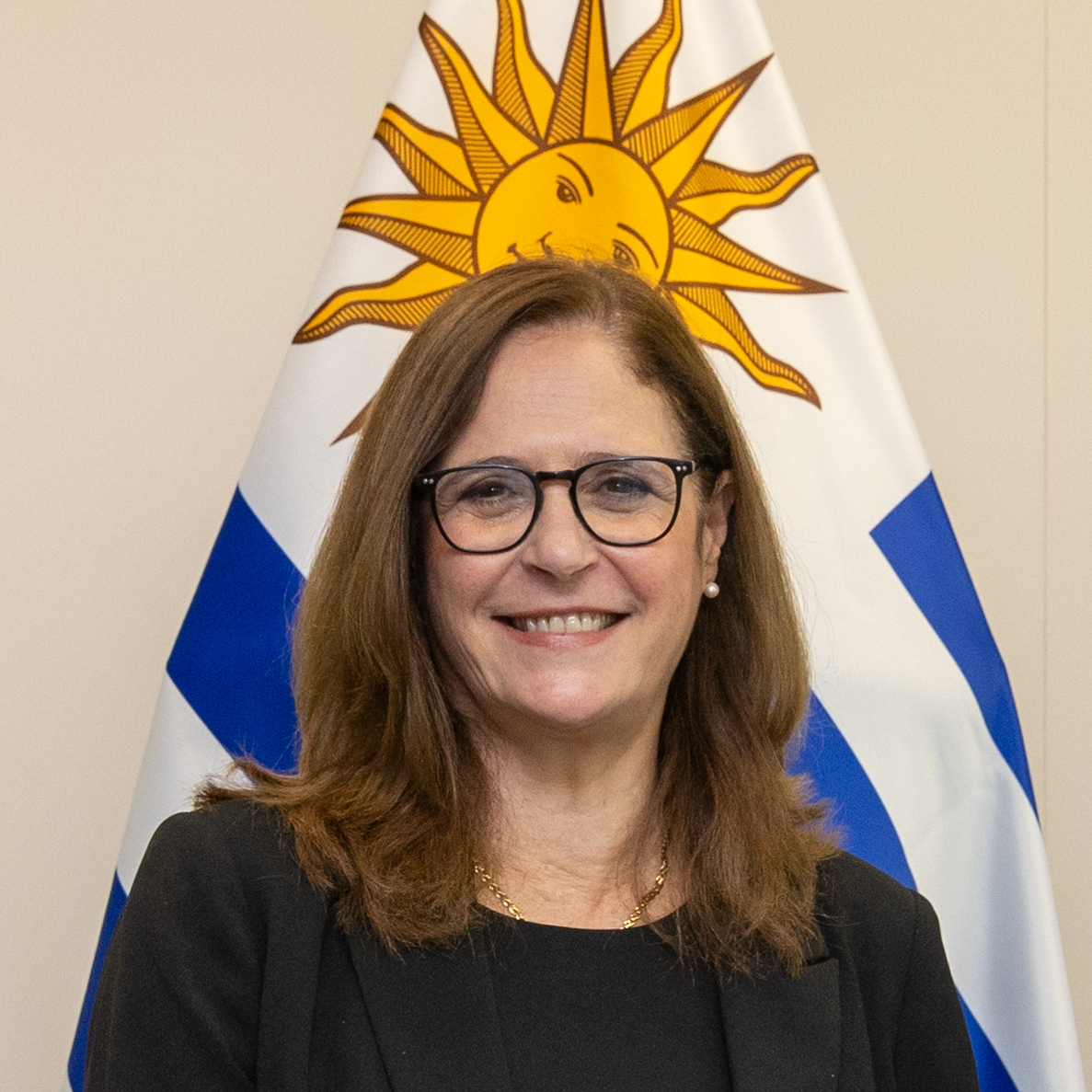
- Education: University of the Republic
- Occupations: computer engineer, government minister
- Known for: Minister of Industry, Energy and Mining of Uruguay
- Predecessor: Omar Paganini

Elisa Facio became Uruguay's Minister of Industry, Energy and Mining of Uruguay in November 2023.

== Life ==
Facio attended the University of the Republic where she studied computer engineering. She graduated and then went on to take a master's degree at the same university before she became a computer engineer.

She was the general director of the Ministry of Industry, Energy, and Mining before she became the minister of Industry, Energy and Mining of Uruguay in November 2023. She joined President Luis Alberto Lacalle Pou's Cabinet, replacing Omar Paganini who was promoted to foreign minister. The cabinet reshuffle was required because of the scandal associated with the sudden resignation of Francisco Bustillo.

Facio's responsibilities are in her job title but she is also responsible for intellectual property and the medical use of nuclear technology. She has spoken about the opportunities to develop alternative energy sources including wind, solar, and hydrogen. Uruguay is working in these areas but they have only exploited a small fraction of what is possible. They are hewld back by lack of finance and she sees other countries including those in Europe as potential investors. In November 2023 she went to China.

In May 2024 she was with a large delegation from Uruguay at the World Hydrogen Summit in Rotterdam. She explained her ambitionsin support of decarbonisation by 2050. An Innovation Hub program had been established to deliver these ambitions.

In October 2024 she declared amethyst to be Uruguay's national stone. She noted that the country's exports included $60m obtained from amethyst export and the industry created 2,000 jobs.
