= Adrián Peña =

Uruguayan politician (1976–2024)

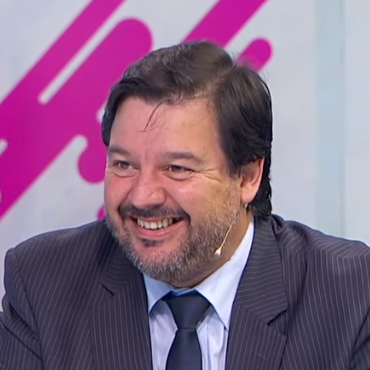
- Peña in 2021

Minister of Environment
- In office 27 August 2020 – 30 January 2023
- President: Luis Alberto Lacalle Pou
- Succeeded by: Robert Bouvier Torterolo

Senator of Uruguay
- In office 15 February 2020 – 26 August 2020
- In office 10 April 2023 – 4 April 2024

General Secretary of the Colorado Party of Uruguay
- In office 24 May 2017 – 1 December 2018
- Preceded by: Germán Cardoso

Representative of Uruguay for Canelones
- In office 15 February 2015 – 14 February 2020

Personal details
- Born: Nelson Adrián Peña Robaina; 20 January 1976 San Bautista, Uruguay
- Died: 4 April 2024 (aged 48) Canelones Department, Canelones, Uruguay
- Party: Colorado Party
- Education: Catholic University of Uruguay

Nelson Adrián Peña Robaina (20 January 1976 – 4 April 2024) was a Uruguayan businessman and politician of the Colorado Party. He served as the first Minister of the Environment from 27 August 2020 to 30 January 2023.

Peña was involved in politics from the age of 13, but it was only in 2009 that he decided to head a political project in his department. A native of the town of San Bautista, Peña was dedicated to the business of raising and distributing poultry.

Peña died in a car accident on Route 36 in the Canelones Department, on the night of 4 April 2024. He was 48.

== Early life and education ==
Peña was from San Bautista. He started his career in the poultry industry.

== Political career ==
In 1994, he began his political career attached to Lista 15 de Canelones, in support of Jorge Batlle. In the 2004 election, he supported the candidacy for the presidency of Guillermo Stirling, and in 2008 he joined the "Batllismo Unido" faction of the Department of Canelones and "Vamos Uruguay".

In 2009 he was elected National and Departmental Conventional in the presidential primaries. That year he was also elected a member of the Departmental Executive Committee of the Colorado Party in Canelones. In August 2009, he joined a new political group, with the aim of renewing the Colorado Party in Canelones. In October, he was a candidate for National Representative for List 11, supporting Pedro Bordaberry's candidacy for the Senate.

In the 2014 presidential primaries, his political group was the winner within the Colorado Party. In the general election, he was elected National Representative for Canelones, for the 48th Legislature. In November 2014 he was unanimously elected General Secretary of the Colorado Party in Canelones and in December 2014, he was elected a titular member of the National Executive Committee of the Colorado Party.

On 31 May 2017, he was elected General Secretary of the Colorado Party. In 2018 he founded, together with the Economist Ernesto Talvi, "Ciudadanos" political group within the PC. In the 2019 general election, he supported Talvi's candidacy for President of the Republic. In it, he was elected Senator.

=== Minister of Environment ===
On 18 July 2020, his appointment as the first Minister of the Environment was confirmed, when the portfolio was separated from the Ministry of Housing and Territorial Planning. He took office on 27 August in Aguas Corrientes.

In a January 2021 interview, he described GMO crops and sustainable agriculture as priorities, alongside improving drinking water quality and water management.

Peña resigned as the Minister of Environment on 30 January 2023 after it was discovered he had lied about his title in Business Administration.

Peña returned to his seat in the senate in 10 April 2023, which had been occupied by his replacement, Pablo Lanz, since August 2020.
