= Bangladesh–Uruguay relations =

- Bangladesh: Uruguay

Diplomatic mission
- Embassy of Bangladesh, Brasilia: Embassy of Uruguay, New Delhi

Envoy
- Ambassador Md. Tauhedul Islam: Ambassador Alberto Guani Amarilla

Bangladesh–Uruguay relations refer to the diplomatic relations between Bangladesh and Uruguay. Both countries are members of the Group of 77.

== Diplomatic missions ==
Uruguay recognized Bangladesh in 1972, and they extablished diplomatic relations on 15 July 1987.

The main diplomatic mission of Bangladesh for Uruguay is the Embassy of Bangladesh in Brasília. At the same time, the Embassy of Uruguay in New Delhi serves as the primary diplomatic mission for Uruguay in Bangladesh.

Bangladesh has a Consulate in Montevideo. And Uruguay also has a Consulate in Dhaka.

== Economic relations ==
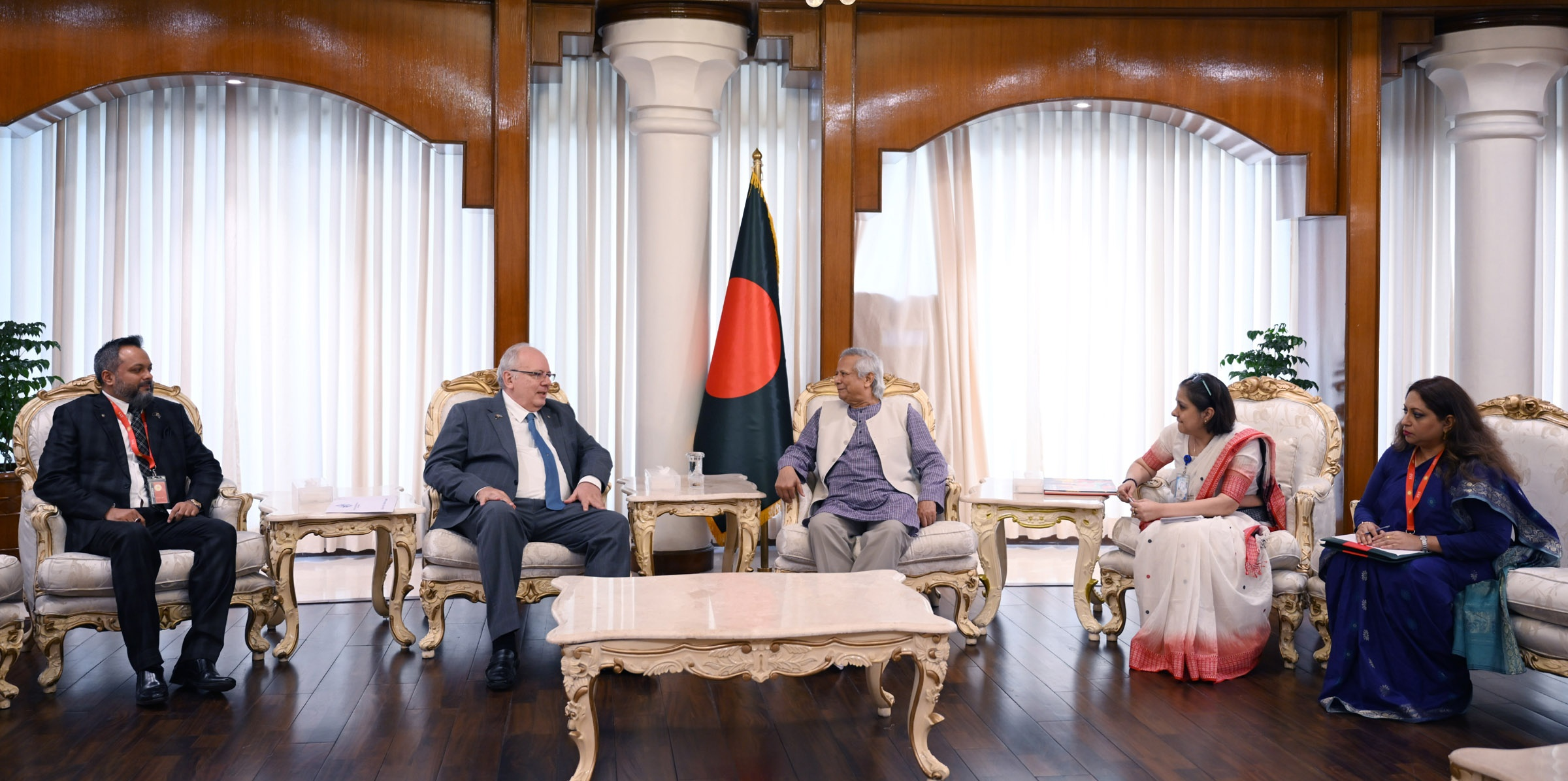
Ambassador Alberto Guani meeting Muhammad Yunus

In January 2026, Bangladesh and Uruguay had their first ever bilateral political consultations. They signed a Memorandum of Understanding. Both sides agreed to promote increased private sector involvement, including regular interactions between their leading chambers of commerce and industry. Bangladesh proposed strengthening collaboration in trade, technology, defense, disaster management, health, education, energy, and agriculture. Uruguay has shown interest in enhancing cooperation in agriculture, fisheries, livestock, energy, and sports.

Bangladesh Garment Manufacturers and Exporters Association thinks Uruguay can be the gateway for the Mercosur market for garment exports.

== See also ==
- Foreign relations of Bangladesh
- Foreign relations of Uruguay
