= Revue de Synthèse =

French academic journal

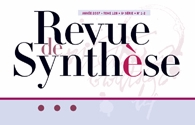
Revue de Synthèse logo, as of 2007

The journal Revue de Synthèse (abbreviation: RSyn) was created by Henri Berr in 1900 under the title Revue de synthèse historique. It has had a variety of editorial partners since its creation. It is currently published in paper and electronic version by the Springer Verlag publishing company in Paris.

== Background of the journal ==
In 1900, Henri Berr founded the journal Revue de synthèse historique to respond to abuses of learning and compartmentalization among disciplines. A venue for interdisciplinary exchanges, particularly between philosophers and historians and between geographers and sociologists, the journal quickly gained legitimacy in the field of scholarly journals and wielded considerable influence in the emergence of a new history that was expressed with the creation of the encyclopaedic collection L'Évolution de l'Humanité run by Henri Berr himself and by Lucien Febvre, and then with the creation, in 1929, of Annales d'histoire économique et sociale by Lucien Febvre and Marc Bloch. The Journal has been published under several series:

== First series 1900-13 ==
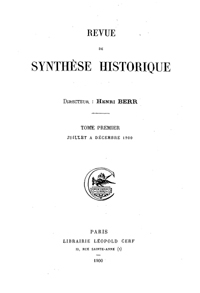
1900 cover page

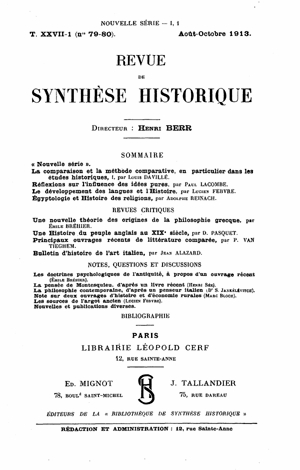
1913 cover page

From 1900 to 1913, the first of these was an expression of Henri Berr's initial project (see the program published in 1900).

== Second series 1913-30 ==
After ten years (see the overview written in 1910) and in tandem with the creation of the collection L'Évolution de l'Humanité, the second series, published from 1913 to 1930, pursued the same objectives as Revue de synthèse historique (see the notice for the new series in 1913) and broadened them to include debates that were then surrounding reforms in the mathematical and physical sciences, philosophy and the history of science, and the development of new approaches to social sciences. The Journal became the mouthpiece of the Foundation "Pour la science" and of the Centre international de synthèse, created in 1925 by Henri Berr

== Third series 1931-85 ==
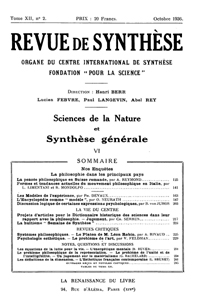
1936 cover page

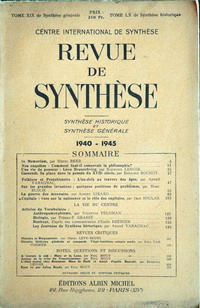
1945 cover page

Some years later, it would be transformed into a third series, published from 1931 to 1985, entitled Revue de synthèse (see "Au bout de trente ans", 1931). It is still published under this title today. Its change of direction in 1931 was contemporary with the creation of Annales. From this point on, Revue de synthèse welcomed pieces on philosophy, the history of science and the social and human sciences, whereas the new journal looked at economic and social history. It became one of the vehicles for the spread of the logical empiricism of the Vienna Circle in the French language. Robert Bouvier, the Swiss philosopher, acted as an intermediary with Otto Neurath, translating his texts and maintaining a correspondence with him.

== Fourth series 1986-2001 ==
The fourth series was published, like its predecessor, in partnership with the Éditions Albin Michel publishing company, from 1986 to 2001. In a context where certainties surrounding economic and social history were disintegrating, it aimed to revive intellectual history and the history of science on the initiative of Jacques Roger, Ernest Coumet and Jean-Claude Perrot (see "Aux lecteurs", 1986). After sixteen years of collective work, it took up the journal's original objective: finding a way to best express the agenda of history and the social sciences by subjecting it to the modern-day dictates of philosophical critique and the requirements of mathematical, physical and biological sciences.

== Fifth series 2002-2006 ==
A fifth series appeared in partnership with the Rue d'Ulm publishing house at the École Normale Supérieure and covered the years 2002 to 2006, continuing a long tradition of discreet and rigorous explorations of connections and encounters between separate but necessarily interactive disciplines and the contemporary critical review of sciences and social sciences (see "Aux lecteurs", 2002). A century after its creation, Revue de synthèse ran an overview of changes in relations between disciplines and of technical and economic reforms specific to scientific publishing (texts published in 2004, 2006).

== Sixth series and Seventh since 2017 on ==
In 2007, a sixth series was opened in partnership with the Springer Verlag publishing company, extending its influence on the international scientific scene (see its presentation, 2007). "We managed to produce the ideal journal" wrote Henri Berr after just ten years, "that would continuously modernize and upgrade, while always doing its best in the right direction".

== Today ==
Today, published with Brill Publishers, Revue de synthèse describes its current activity in these terms:

"Thanks to support from scholars in France and abroad, Revue de synthèse now welcomes pieces that deal with intellectual history, epistemology, philosophy, sociology, and economic, social, legal and cultural history. Its mission is to serve as a forum for discussions taking place at the crossroads between philosophy, the history of science and general history by encouraging research and exchanges on issues concerning the foundations of social sciences, changes in scientific investigation and the development of new approaches specific to intellectual history.*"

"The journal studies the historically dated cognitive activity of scientists, philosophers, people in power and scholars; it reintegrates the development of concepts and ideas, in the traditional sense of the term, in its genetic environment: the anthropological, linguistic, institutional and social milieu that allows for its expression and distribution. In short, Revue de synthèse thoroughly examines the history of intellectual work. It looks to shed light on criteria relating to the scientific quality of the social sciences. In this regards, it stands out from other French and international publications.*"

* Source: information about the Journal given to the Centre national du Livre and distributed by its editorial partners.

In a context where disciplinary exchanges are undergoing major changes in France and abroad, Revue de synthèse is now planning to play its part by returning in full force to its original mission, at the crossroads between philosophy, history, the sciences and social sciences, helping to form future scholars and intervening more easily on the international scene thanks to its partnership with the scientific publisher Springer Verlag, which dates from 2007.

The Journal's editorial staff notes that such reforms cannot rightfully take place without offering a reflection on the progress of specialized knowledge in the 20th century. As a result, since the early 1990s, it has been deliberately encouraging work on the history of science and the intellectual history of the past century, by organizing research days, granting access to its archives at the Institut pour la Mémoire de l'édition contemporaine (IMEC), publishing specialized works and digitizing its collection in partnership with the Bibliothèque nationale de France.

Revue de synthèse has been directed by Eric Brian since 1995 (see the full masthead). The ideas featured in the sixth and seventh series are presented in the bilingual article "Travail de synthèse et diversité des langues/Synthesis work and diversity of languages", which opens the first issue of 2007.

Distributed in both electronic and paper version, Revue de synthèse is published twice a year. In each edition it either presents the results of a long-standing project or a topical research report enhanced with additional texts or relevant documents. A large part of the publication is reserved for critical reviews, research columns, reports and reader's notes (see the keys to the Journal given by Henri Berr in 1911, 1925, 1931).

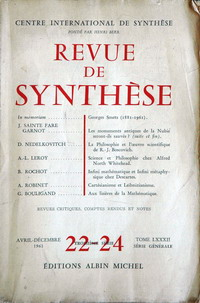
1960 (3rd series) cover page

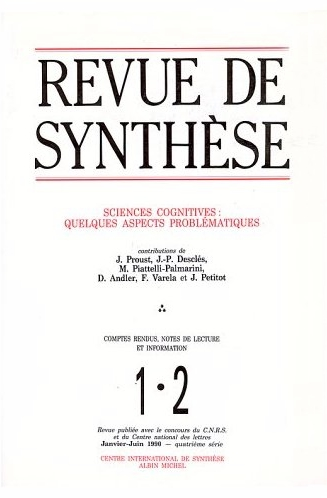
1990 (4th series) cover page

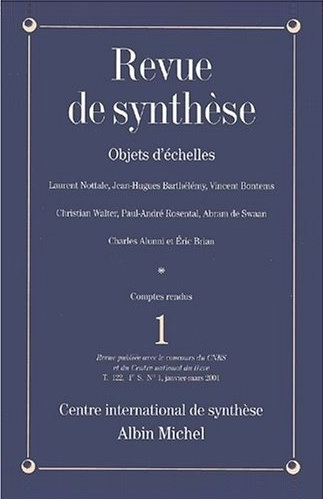
2001 (4th series) cover page

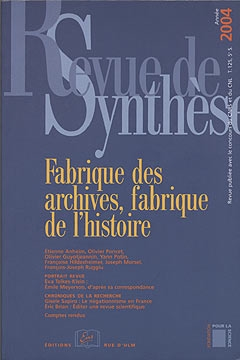
2004 (5th series) cover page
