= Carlos Pita =

Carlos Pita may refer to:

- Carlos Pita (footballer) (born 1984), Spanish footballer
- Carlos Pita (politician) (born 1951), Uruguayan politician
