= Anchorena Presidential Estate =

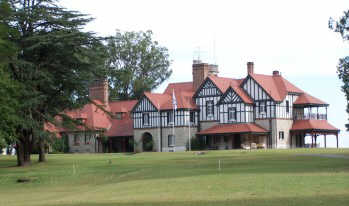

General information
- Type: Official residence
- Architectural style: Norman and Tudor
- Coordinates: 34.2795°S 57.9806°W
- Inaugurated: 1911
- Owner: Government of Uruguay

The Anchorena Presidencial Estate is a national park and rest residence of the President of Uruguay. It is located in the Colonia Department, in southwestern Uruguay, 208 kilometers from Montevideo.

Anchorena Park originated from a bequest by Argentine landowner Aarón de Anchorena, who donated approximately 1,369 hectares of his estancia at Barra del Río San Juan to the Uruguayan state. The donation stipulated that the land be used as a public park for conservation, tourism, and educational purposes—“for the welfare and enjoyment of the population”—and that the main residence serve as a presidential retreat.

== History ==
The origin of the park dates back to 1907 when Anchorena, in the company of his friend Jorge Newbery, flew over the Río de la Plata in a hot air balloon called "El Pampero", the first to fly. Anchorena was amazed and wanted to buy land in the north of the department, but since they were not available for sale, his mother bought him 11,000 hectares in the area of the mouth of the San Juan River, which Anchorena had seen from the globe. Anchorena entrusted the park design to the German landscaper Hermann Bötrich. Anchorena's first house remains intact: it is made of material with a zinc roof, the typical Creole country house with row windows, reaching the floor, under the eaves that run its entire length.

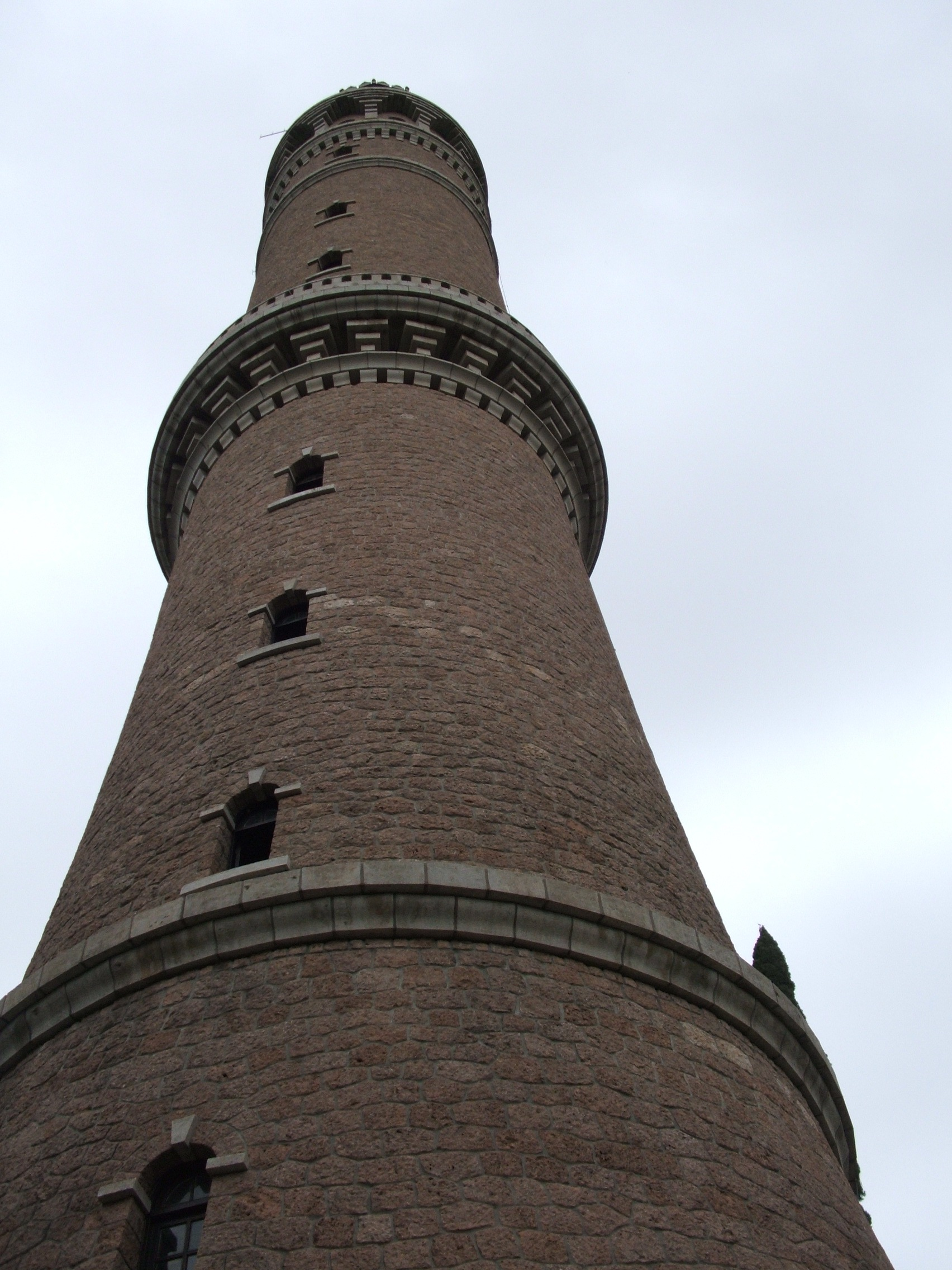
Anchorena Tower

Anchorena's will bequeathed the park to the Uruguayan State, with the conditions that his body was buried at the site and that it be a public park. He died in 1965 and conserved 4,700 hectares, of which 1,370 became state-administered. In his legacy he demanded that the ranch function as a park for educational purposes and environmental preservation.

In 1927 the "Anchorena Tower", which measures 75 meters, was inaugurated, in tribute to the explorer Sebastián Cabot. At its base, Anchorena ordered the construction of a tomb where his remains lie, as he stated in his will.

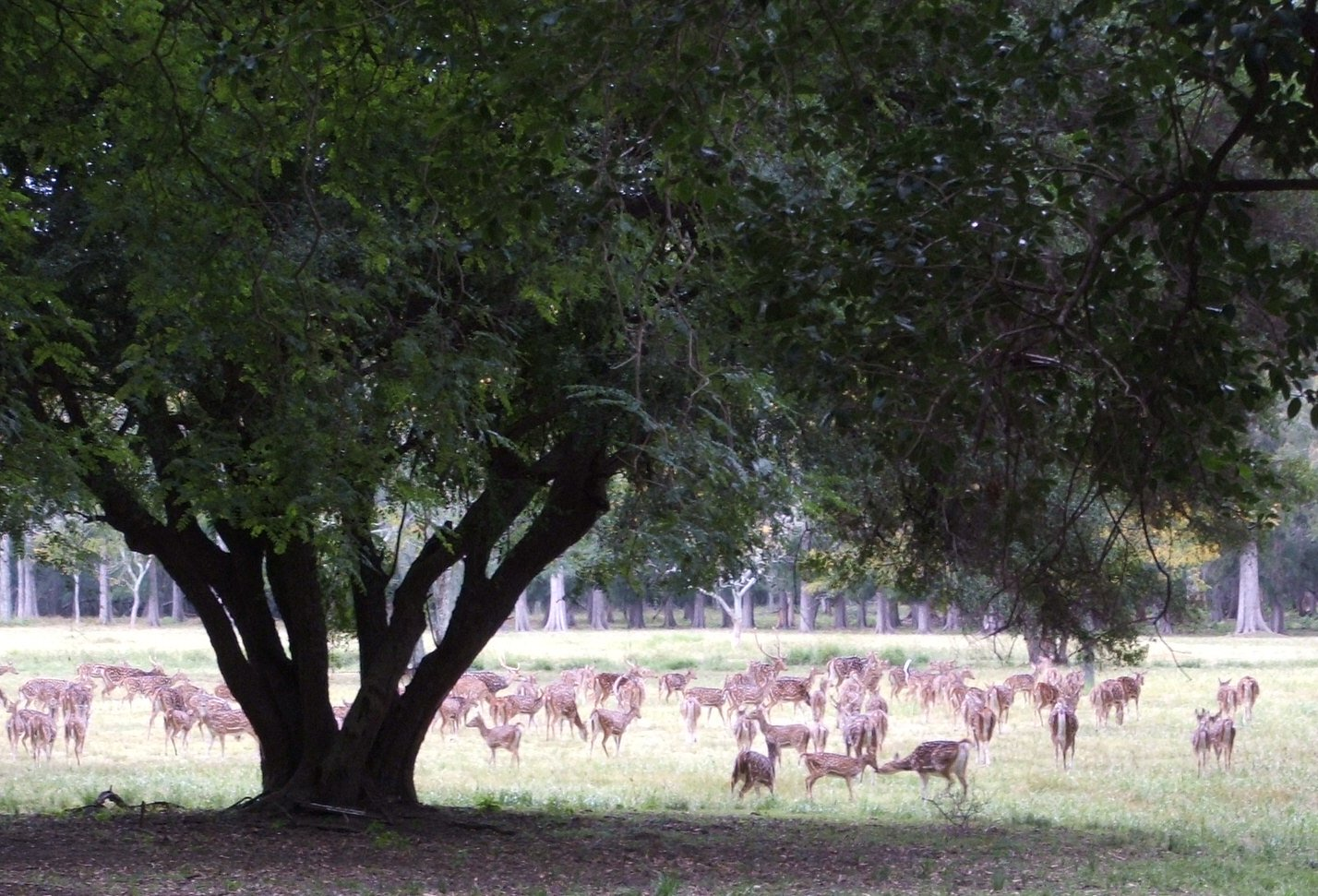
Chital group in the park

Among more than 200 tree and shrub species -from all corners of the planet- they stand out for the remarkable development of their specimens, various species of oak, cork, araucaria, bald cypress, Japanese maples and more than 60 species of eucalyptus, which they are part of one of the most important collections in the country. In addition, native and exotic species coexist in the park. Among the first, birds stand out, represented by more than 75 species. Among the exotic species, the Chital, originally from India, that Anchorena introduced in our country in the 1920s is especially attractive. The Axis, considered the most beautiful of the cervids in the world, abounds in the Park.

== Presidential residence ==
Following the death of Aarón de Anchorena in 1965, the estate and its surrounding lands were transferred to the Uruguayan state under the condition that the area be converted into a public national park, while the main residence would serve as the official retreat of the country’s head of state and government. The mansion, built in the 1910s, combines the Norman and Tudor styles.

The residence began operating in this capacity in 1968, during the presidency of Jorge Pacheco Areco. Since then, it has served as an official retreat for successive constitutional presidents, as well as a venue for Cabinet meetings and bilateral meetings with foreign heads of state. The surrounding area was formally opened to the public as Anchorena National Park in 1989.

Visitors to the estate have included US President George Bush, Spanish Prime Minister Felipe González, Anne, Princess Royal of the United Kingdom, Brazilian President Luiz Inácio Lula da Silva and Argentine presidents Cristina Fernández de Kirchner, Mauricio Macri and Alberto Fernández.

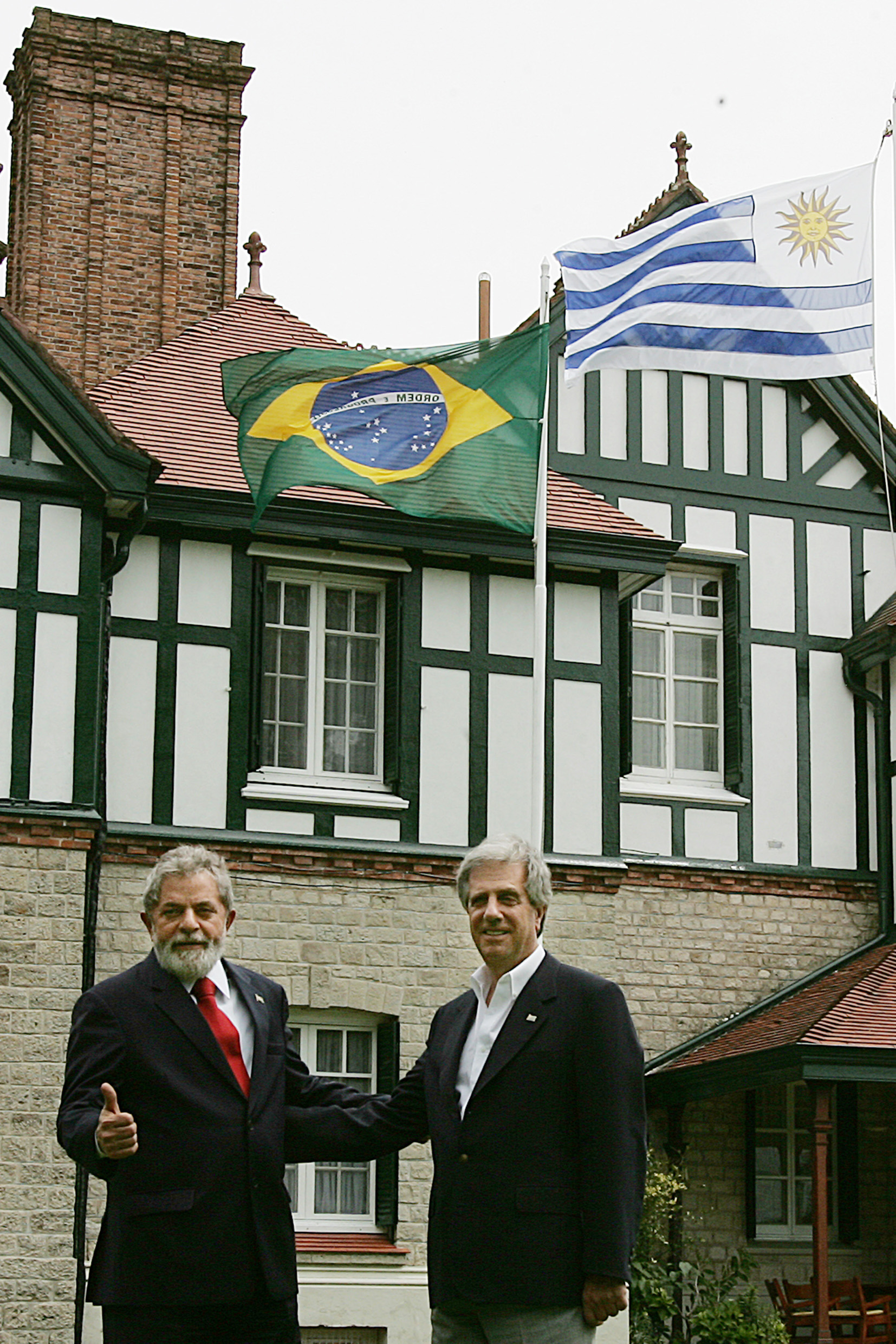
Tabaré Vázquez with Brazilian President Luiz Inácio Lula da Silva, February 2007

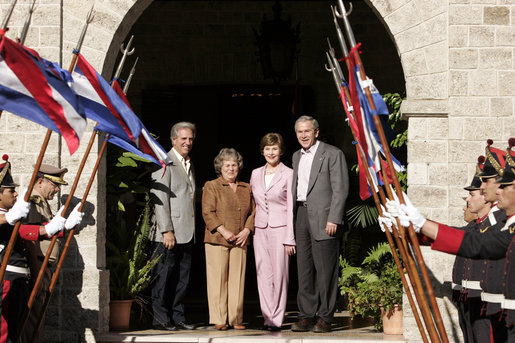
President Tabaré Vázquez and First Lady María Auxiliadora Delgado with the President of the United States George Bush and First Lady Laura Bush at the main entrance, March 2007

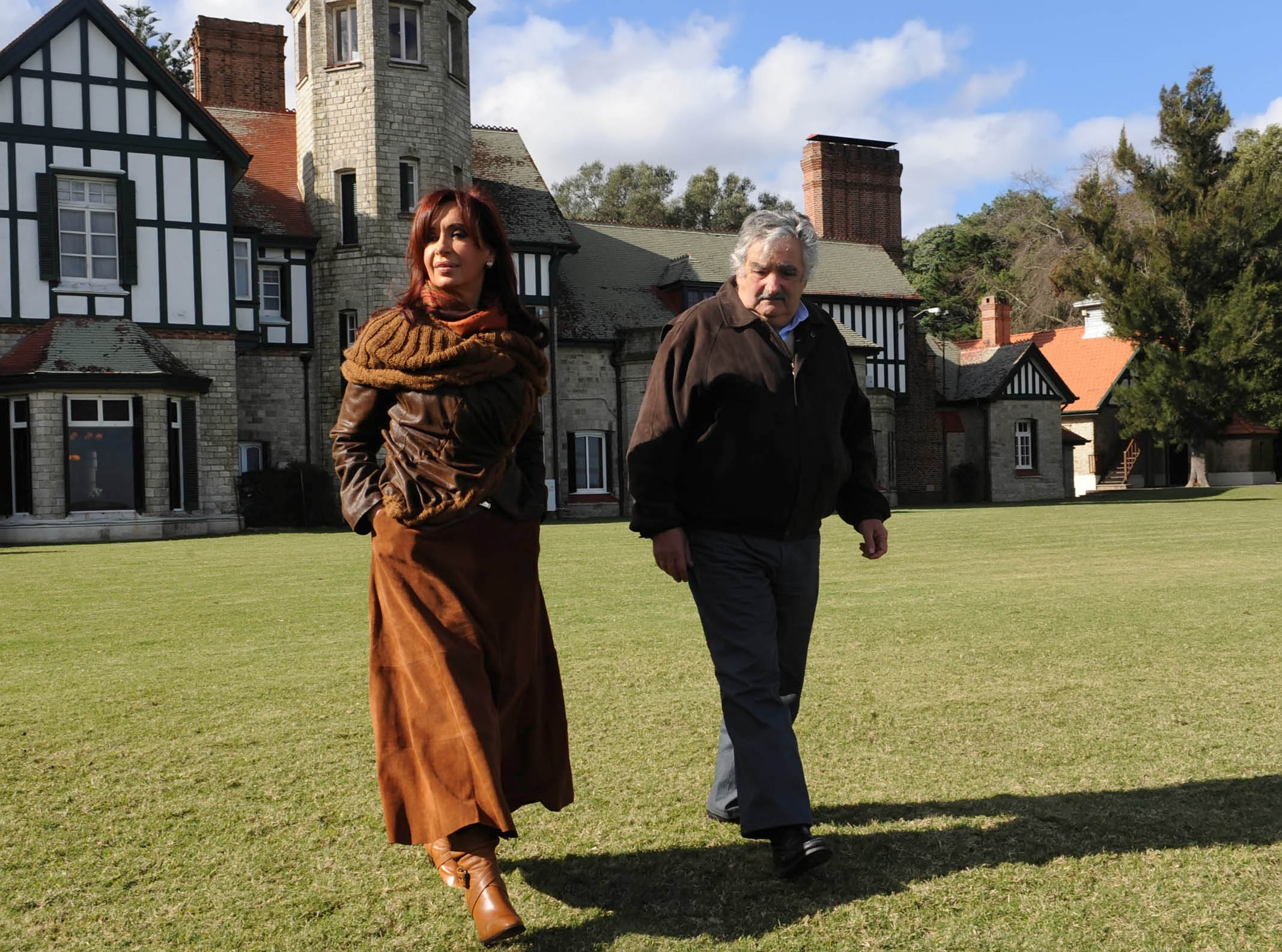
President José Mujica with Argentine President Cristina Fernández de Kircher in the gardens of the residence, June 2010.

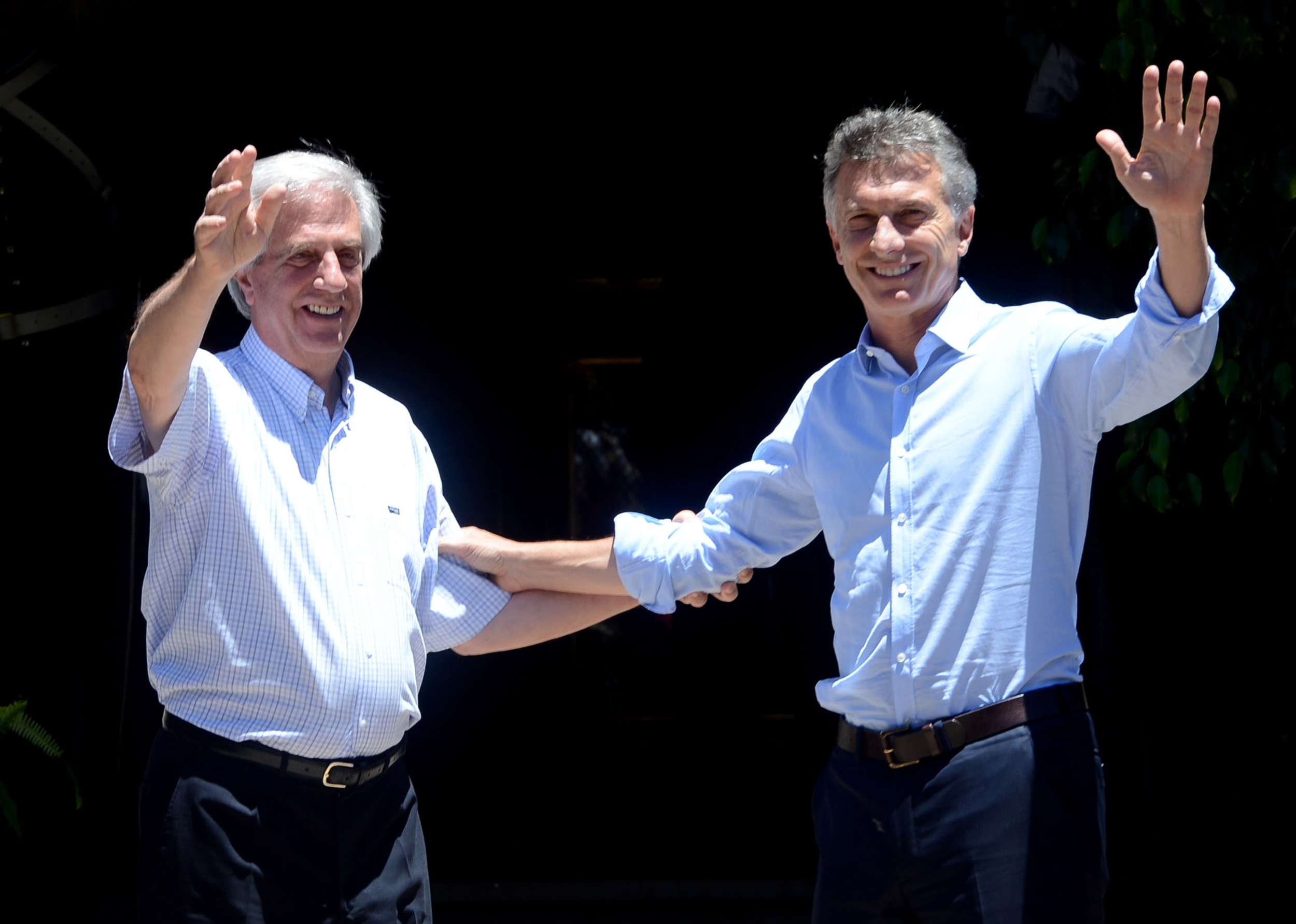
Tabaré Vázquez with Argentine President Mauricio Macri, January 2016
