= San Bautista =

- City & Municipality
- Location in Uruguay
- Coordinates: 34°26′25″S 55°57′35″W
- Country: Uruguay
- Department: Canelones

Population (2011 Census)
  - Total: 1,973
- Time zone: UTC -3
- Postal code: 90604
- Dial plan: +598 4313 (+4 digits)

San Bautista is a small city in the Canelones Department of southern Uruguay.

San Bautista is also the name of the municipality to which the city belongs.

== Geography ==
=== Location ===
The city is located on the intersection of Route 6 with Route 81, about 60 kilometres (37 mi) north of the centre of Montevideo.

== History ==
According to the Act of Ley Nº 388, on 28 June 1854 it was holding the status of "Villa" (town). On 20 June 1901, it was given the status of "Pueblo" (village) by the Act of Ley Nº 2.699. Its status was elevated to "Ciudad" (city) on 8 June 1993 by the Act of Ley Nº 16.380.

== Population ==
In 2011 San Bautista had a population of 1,973. The Intendencia de Canelones has estimated a population of 4,045 for the municipality.

Location map of the Municipality of San Bautista

Year	Population
1908	4,051
1963	1,750
1975	1,454
1985	1,555
1996	1,685
2004	1,880
2011	1,973

Source: Instituto Nacional de Estadística de Uruguay

== Notable people ==
- Adrián Peña (1976–2024), politician
- Agustín Álvarez Martínez (born 2001), footballer
- Yanina Fernández (born 1994), footballer

== Places of worship ==
- St. John the Baptist Parish Church (Roman Catholic)
