= Yanina Fernández =

Uruguayan footballer (born 1994)

Personal information
- Full name: María Yanina Fernández Birriel
- Date of birth: 19 April 1994 (age 32)
- Place of birth: San Bautista, Uruguay
- Height: 1.77 m (5 ft 9 1/2 in)
- Positions: Centre back; left back

Senior career*
Years	Team	Apps	(Gls)
- Vida Nueva

International career^{‡}
2014	Uruguay U20		
2014	Uruguay	1	(0)
- * Club domestic league appearances and goals ‡ National team caps and goals as of 13 September 2014

María Yanina Fernández Birriel (born 19 April 1994), known as Yanina Fernández, is a Uruguayan footballer who plays as a centre back. She has been a member of the Uruguay women's national team.

== International career ==
Fernández represented Uruguay at the 2014 South American U-20 Women's Championship. At senior level, she played the 2014 Copa América Femenina.
