= Fernanda Cardona =

Uruguayan lawyer and politician

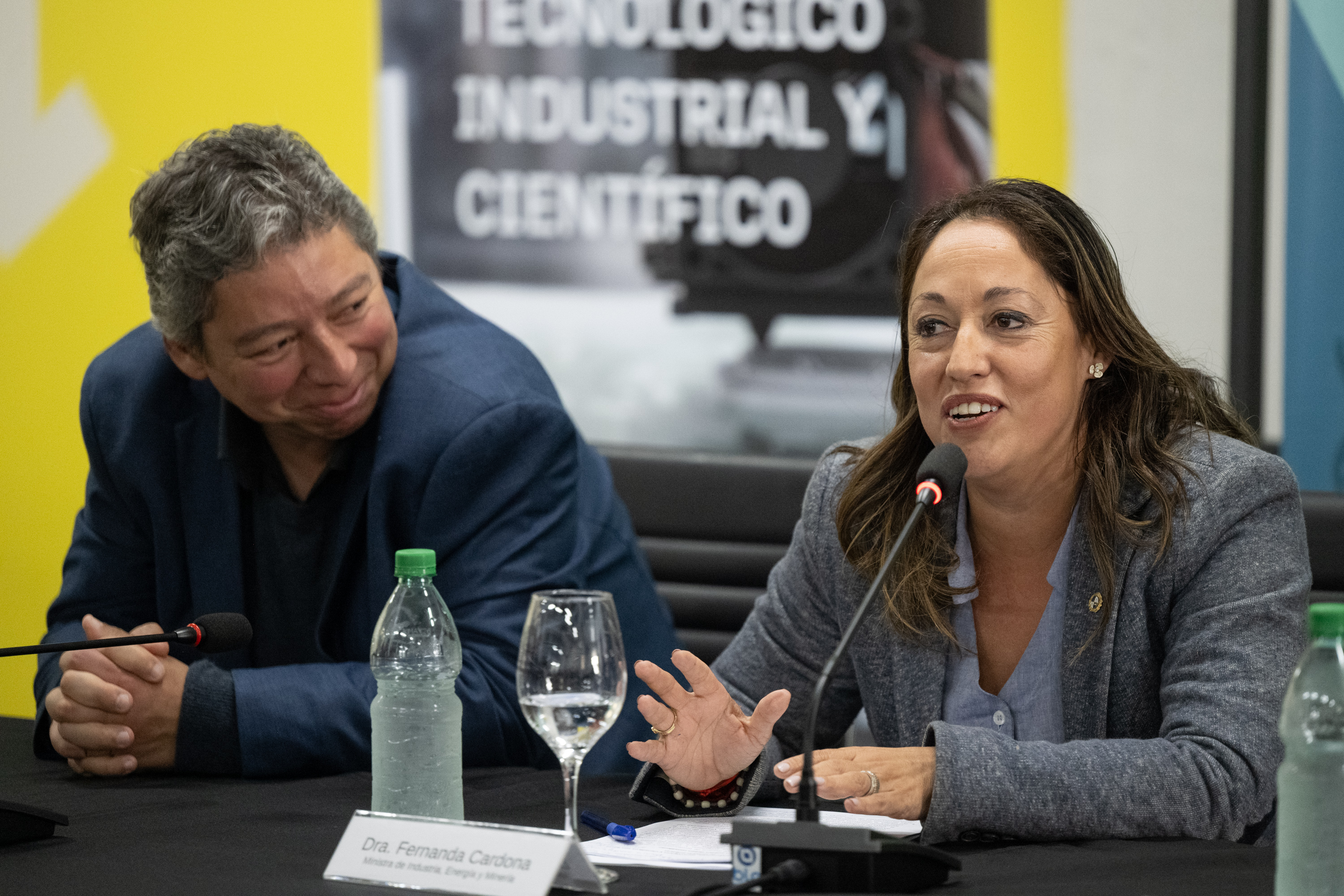
- Cardona (right) in 2025

Minister of Industry, Energy and Mining of Uruguay
- Incumbent
- Assumed office 1 March 2025
- President: Yamandú Orsi
- Preceded by: Elisa Facio

Personal details
- Born: 1977 (age 48–49) Montevideo, Uruguay
- Party: Movement of Popular Participation
- Education: University of the Republic; University of Montevideo
- Occupation: Lawyer; academic; politician

Fernanda Cardona is an Uruguayan lawyer and politician. A member of the Broad Front, she has served as the Minister of Industry, Energy and Mining since March 2025.

== Early life and education ==
Fernanda Cardona was born in Montevideo in 1977. She graduated with a doctorate in law and social sciences from the University of the Republic and with a postgraduate degree in Applied Labor Law from the University of Montevideo.

== Career ==
After graduating, she worked as a law professor and a legal advisor for the National Civil Service Office. From May 2010 to January 2014, she worked as a legal advisor to the Presidency of the Board of Directors of government-owned power company UTE. She then worked as a legal advisor to the Presidency of the Board of Directors of government-owned telecommunications company ANTEL until February 2015. She was the Director General of the Secretariat of the Ministry of Industry, Energy and Mining (MIEM) from March 2015 to February 2020. She served as a member of the UTE board of directors, representing the Broad Front, until March 2025, when she was appointed to be the Minister of Industry, Energy and Mining.
