= Florence Weber =

French sociologist (born 1958)

- Born: 31 January 1958 (age 68)
- Occupations: Researcher and University professor

Academic background
- Education: Paris 8 University Paris Descartes University École Normale Supérieure École des Hautes Études en Sciences Sociales

Academic work
- Discipline: Anthropology, Sociology
- Institutions: École Normale Supérieure, Centre Maurice Halbwachs
- Website: https://www.cmh.ens.fr/author/florence-weber/

Florence Weber, born 31 January 1958, is a French sociologist and anthropologist who has worked on the rural and working class worlds in France.

== Research and positions ==
Florence Weber is a university professor at the École normale supérieure, where she was head of the social sciences department, and a researcher at the Maurice-Halbwachs Center, a research center of the ENS, EHESS, Cnrs and INRAE.

Her work focuses on the methodology of fieldwork, on economic activities analyzed from a sociological perspective, and on the care of disabled and dependent people by the family, the market, and the state, especially when these people are described in terms of cognitive disabilities or mental disorders. She is recently committed to a contemporary practice of photography armed with social science. She is one of the pioneers in this field in France, particularly alongside Jean-Robert Dantou.

== Education ==
Student at the École normale supérieure des jeunes filles (1977–1982)

Agrégée in Social Sciences (1981)

MAS in Social anthropology from the EHESS (1981)

New regime thesis at EHESS (1986)

Habilitation to direct research at Paris VIII (2000) which is the highest French degree

== Books (in French) ==
- 1989. Le travail à-côté. Étude d'ethnographie ouvrière. Paris : INRA/Éd. EHESS. Reprinted in the coll «Réimpressions», Éd. EHESS, 2001.
- 1997 with Stéphane Beaud, Guide de l'enquête de terrain. Produire et analyser des données ethnographiques, Paris, La Découverte, coll. «Guides Repères», 4th edition 2010, translated into Portuguese (2007, Guia para a pesquisa de campo, Vozes, Petropolis, RJ, Brasil) and Serbian.
- 2003, with Agnès Gramain and Séverine Gojard. Charges de famille. Dépendance et parenté dans la France contemporaine, Paris, La Découverte, coll. « Textes à l'appui, Enquêtes de terrain »
- 2005, with Laurent Feller and Agnès Gramain. La fortune de Karol. Marché de la terre et liens personnels dans les Abruzzes au haut Moyen Age, Rome, École Française de Rome, « Collection de l'École française de Rome, 347 »
- 2005. Le Sang, le nom, le quotidien. Une sociologie de la parenté pratique. La Courneuve : Aux lieux d'être, 264 p.
- 2007 with Caroline Dufy. L'ethnographie économique. Paris : La Découverte, coll. « Repères ». Translated into Spanish (2009, Más allá de la Gran División. Sociología, economía y etnografía, Antropofagia, Buenos Aires)
- 2007. « Introduction. Vers une ethnographie des prestations sans marché », in Mauss Marcel, Essai sur le don, Paris, PUF, « Quadrige, Grands Textes »
- 2008. Le travail au noir : une fraude parfois vitale ? Paris : Éditions rue d'Ulm.
- 2009. Manuel de l'ethnographe. Paris : PUF, coll. « Quadrige Manuels »
- 2009. Le Travail à-côté. Une ethnographie des perceptions. Paris : Éditions EHESS. Coll. « En temps & lieux ». New edition with an afterword. Translated into Portuguese (2009, Trabalho fora do trabalho. Uma ethnografia das percepçoes, Garamond, "Culture and Economy", Rio de Janeiro, Brazil)
- 2011. Handicap et dépendance. Drames humains, enjeux politiques, Éditions Rue d'Ulm, coll. « CEPREMAP », Paris
- 2011. with Laurence Fontaine. Les Paradoxes de l'économie informelle. A qui profitent les règles? Karthala, Paris
- 2013. Penser la parenté aujourd'hui. La force du quotidien, Éditions Rue d'Ulm, coll. « Sciences sociales », Paris
- 2014. with Loïc Trabut and Solène Billaud. Le Salaire de la confiance. L'aide à domicile aujourd'hui, Éditions Rue d'Ulm, coll. «Sciences sociales», Paris
- 2014. with Eric Brian, Stephan Moebius, Frithjof Nungesser. « Relire Marcel Mauss. Relektüren von Marcel Mauss », Trivium. Revue Franco-allemande de sciences humaines et sociales, vol. 17 in free access
- 2015. Brève histoire de l'anthropologie, Flammarion, coll. « Champs », Paris
- 2015. with Jean-Robert Dantou. Les Murs ne parlent pas. Trois dispositifs photographiques pour une enquête en psychiatrie, Kehrer Verlag, Heidelberg.
