= Robert Bouvier Torterolo =

Uruguayan politician (born 1966)

Robert Bouvier

Minister of Environment of Uruguay
- In office 1 February 2023 – 1 March 2025
- President: Luis Lacalle Pou
- Preceded by: Adrián Peña
- Succeeded by: Edgardo Ortuño

Vice President of the National Administration of Telecommunications
- In office 27 June 2020 – 30 January 2023
- Preceded by: Daniel Fuentes
- Succeeded by: Pablo Lanz

Personal details
- Born: Robert Bouvier Torterolo; 1966 (age 59–60) Minas, Uruguay
- Party: Colorado Party
- Occupation: Politician

Robert Bouvier Torterolo (born 1966) is a Uruguayan accountant and politician of the Colorado Party (PC), who served as Minister of Environment from 2023 to 2025, under president Luis Lacalle Pou.

== Political career ==
Bouvier began his political activity in 1993 on the Lista 15 faction of the Colorado Party. He was edil of Lavalleja Department in three terms. In the 2010 municipal elections he ran for Intendant of Lavalleja, placing second within his party.

After integrating Vamos Uruguay, in 2018 he joined the Ciudadanos faction.

== Minister of Environment ==
At the end of January 2023, he was appointed Minister of the Environment by President Luis Lacalle Pou after the resignation of Adrián Peña amid a controversy.
