= J'ai des doutes =

1991 single by Sara Mandiano

Single by Sara Mandiano

from the album ?
- B-side: "La luna"
- Released: 1991
- Recorded: 1991
- Studio: Synsound Studios, Studio Mega
- Genre: Pop
- Length: 3:24
- Label: Polydor
- Songwriter(s): Sara Mandiano
- Producer(s): Dan Lacksman, Jean-Claude Chachaty

Sara Mandiano singles chronology
"J'ai des doutes" (1991)	"Défense d'y voir" (1991)

"J'ai des doutes" (transl. French for "I Have Doubts") is a 1991 song recorded by French singer-songwriter Sara Mandiano. Written and composed by Mandiano, it was released in the summer of 1991 as her debut single from her album ? on which it was the second track. It became a top ten hit in France and remained Mandiano's only success on the chart, thus becoming a one hit wonder.

== Lyrics and music ==
When reviewing the new singles releases, Music & Media stated that with "J'ai des doutes", Mandiano "creates a stunning Afro/dance workout with a great sing-along chorus", and added: "The right push by radio could swing this into a multi-format monster".

== Chart performance ==
In France, "J'ai des doutes" debuted at number 48 on the chart edition of 13 July 1991 and performed the biggest move of the week in its fifth week, gaining 18 positions, jumping from number 35 to number 17; then it reached a peak of number ten for non consecutive two weeks, and totaled 18 weeks in the top 50. It was certified Silver disc by the Syndicat National de l'Édition Phonographique. On the European Hot 100 Singles, it debuted at number 93 on 17 August 1991, reached a peak of number 55 in the seventh week, and fell off the top 100 after 13 weeks of presence. It was much played on radio and charted on the European Airplay Top 50, peaking at number 32 on 5 October 1991.

== Track listings ==
- CD maxi
1. "J'ai des doutes" (Don Shallak's remix) — 6:24
2. "J'ai des doutes" (album mix) — 3:24
3. "La luna" — 4:23
4. "J'ai des doutes" (Don Shallak's remix) — 3:58
- 7" single
1. "J'ai des doutes" (album mix) — 3:24
2. "La luna" — 4:23
- 12" maxi
1. "J'ai des doutes" (Don Shallak's remix) — 6:24
2. "J'ai des doutes" (album mix) — 3:24
3. "La luna" — 4:23
4. "J'ai des doutes" (Don Shallak's single) — 3:58
- 12" maxi - Promo
1. "J'ai des doutes" (Don Shallak's remix) — 6:24
2. "J'ai des doutes" (Don Shallak's single) — 3:58
- Cassette
1. "J'ai des doutes" (album mix) — 3:24
2. "La luna" — 4:23

== Charts and certifications ==
=== Weekly charts ===
Chart (1991)	Peak position
Europe (European Airplay Top 50)	32
Europe (European Hot 100)	55
France (Airplay Chart [AM Stations])	3
France (Airplay Chart [FM Stations])	13
France (SNEP)	10

=== Certifications ===
Certifications for "J'ai des doutes"
Region	Certification	Certified units/sales
France (SNEP)	Silver	125,000^{*}
^{*} Sales figures based on certification alone.

== Release history ==
Country	Date	Format	Label
France	1991	CD maxi	Polydor
France	1991	7" single	Polydor
France	1991	12" maxi	Polydor
France	1991	Cassette	Polydor
