= Henri Berr =

French philosopher and lycée teacher

Henri Berr (31 January 1863, Lunéville – 19 November 1954, Paris) was a French philosopher and lycée teacher, known as the founder of the journal Revue de synthèse. He is credited with moving the centre of gravity of the study of history in France, in accordance with his ideas on "synthesis". Despite the lack of recognition of his concepts by the academic establishment of the time, and its adverse effect on his own career, he had a large impact on the younger generation of French historians. He is considered to have anticipated significant aspects of the later Annales School.

== Works ==
- Vie et science. Lettres d'un vieux philosophe strasbourgeois et d'un étudiant parisien. Paris, Armand Colin, 1894.
- La Synthèse des connaissances et l'histoire. Essai sur l'avenir de la philosophie, Paris, Hachette, 1898 (thèse de doctorat).
- L'Avenir de la philosophie. Esquisse d'une synthèse des connaissances fondée sur l'histoire. Paris, Hachette, 1899 (republication of the thèse).
- Peut-on refaire l'unité morale de la France ?. Paris, Armand Colin, 1901.
- La Synthèse en histoire. Essai critique et théorique, Paris, Félix Alcan, 1911.
- La Guerre allemande et la paix française. Paris, La Renaissance du livre, 1919.
- L'Histoire traditionnelle et la Synthèse historique. Paris, Félix Alcan, 1921.
- L'Encyclopédie et les encyclopédistes. Paris, Bibliothèque nationale, 1932 (exposition organisée par le Centre international de synthèse; avant-propos de Henri Berr).
- En marge de l'histoire universelle. Paris, La Renaissance du livre, 1934 (plusieurs rééditions jusqu'à : Paris, Albin Michel, 1953)
- L'Hymne à la vie. Roman. Paris, Albin Michel, 1945.
- Problèmes d'avenir. Le Mal de la jeunesse allemande. Paris, Albin Michel, 1946.
- Allemagne, le contre et le pour. Paris, Albin Michel, 1950.
- La Synthèse en histoire. Son rapport avec la synthèse générale. Paris, Albin Michel, 1953 (nouvelle édition).
- La montée de l'esprit. Bilan d'une vie et d'une oeuvre. Paris, Albin Michel, 1955.
- Du Scepticisme de Gassendi (traduction de la thèse latine soutenue par Henri Berr en 1898). Paris, Albin Michel, 1960.
