= Roberto Kreimerman =

Uruguayan engineer and politician

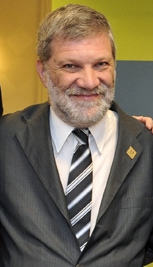
Roberto Kreimerman

Roberto Kreimerman (Montevideo, 1958) is a Uruguayan engineer and politician.

He graduated in Chemical Engineering from the University of the Republic (Uruguay). Afterwards he got a postgraduate degree from the University of Barcelona.

A member of the Broad Front, during 2010-2014 he served as Minister of Industry, Energy and Mining in the cabinet of President José Mujica.

As of 2019, Kreimerman left the Broad Front and joined Popular Unity, running for a Senate seat in the 2019 Uruguayan general election.
