= Ministry of Industry, Energy and Mining =

Government ministry of Uruguay

- Ministerio de Industria, Energía y Minería

Ministry overview
- Formed: 1907
- Jurisdiction: Government of Uruguay
- Headquarters: Montevideo
- Minister responsible: Fernanda Cardona
- Deputy Ministers responsible: Eugenia Villar
- Website: Industry, Energy and Mining

The Ministry of Industry, Energy and Mining (Spanish: Ministerio de Industria, Energía y Minería, MIEM) of Uruguay is a ministry of the Government of Uruguay that is responsible for formulating and promoting the industrial, energy and mining policies of the country.

The Ministry is headquartered in the Paysandú Street in Ciudad Vieja, Montevideo. The acting Minister of Industry, Energy and Mining is Fernanda Cardona, who has held the position since March 1, 2025.

== History ==
In 1907, from the Ministry of Development, the President of the Republic Claudio Williman decided to create the Ministry of Industries, Labor and Public Instruction, it was responsible for livestock, agriculture, police, animal health, Immigration and colonization. The prime minister was Gabriel Terra.

In 1911, the name was changed to the Ministry of Industries, Labor and Communications and in 1935, after a reorganization of the Ministry, he began to take responsibility for Industry and Labor, until in 1967 his name was changed to the Ministry of Industries and Commerce . In 1974, in another reorganization process it was renamed Ministry of Industries and Energy, until in 1991 it received its current structure and was renamed Ministry of Industries, Energy and Mining.

== List of ministers of industry, energy and mining ==
Minister	Party	Began	End
Ministers of Industry and Trade
Julio Lacarte Muró	Colorado Party	1967	1967
Zelmar Michelini	Colorado Party	1967	1967
Horacio Abadie Santos	Colorado Party	1967	1968
Santiago de Brum Carbajal	Colorado Party	1968	1968
Jorge Peirano Facio	Colorado Party	1968	1969
Venancio Flores	Civic Union	1969	1969
Julio María Sanguinetti	Colorado Party	1969	1971
Juan Pedro Amestoy	Without known affiliation	1971	1972
Jorge Echeverría Leúnda	Without known affiliation	1972	1972
Luis Balparda Blengio	National Party	1972	1973
Jorge Presno Harán	National Party	1973	1973
Ministers of Industry and Energy
José Etcheverry Stirling¹	National Party	1973	1974
Adolfo Cardoso Guani¹	Without known affiliation	1974	1976
Luis Heriberto Meyer¹	Without known affiliation	1976	1980
Francisco Tourreilles¹	Without known affiliation	1980	1982
Walter Lusiardo Aznárez¹	Without known affiliation	1982	1982
Juan Chiarino Rossi¹	Without known affiliation	1982	1984
Carlos Pirán	Colorado Party	1985	1986
Jorge Presno Harán	National Party	1986	1990
Ministers of Industry, Energy and Mining
Augusto Montesdeoca	Colorado Party	1990	1992
Eduardo Ache	Colorado Party	1992	1994
Miguel Ángel Galán	National Party	1994	1995
Federico Slinger	Civic Union	1995	1996
Julio Herrera	Colorado Party	1996	2000
Primavera Garbarino	Colorado Party	2000	2000
Sergio Abreu	National Party	2000	2002
Pedro Bordaberry	Colorado Party	2002	2003
José Villar	Colorado Party	2003	2005
Jorge Lepra	Independent	2005	2008
Daniel Martínez	Broad Front	2008	2009
Raúl Fernando Sendic	Broad Front	2009	2010
Roberto Kreimerman	Broad Front	2010	2014
Edgardo Ortuño (Acting)	Broad Front	2014	2014
Roberto Kreimerman	Broad Front	2014	2014
Edgardo Ortuño	Broad Front	2014	2015
Carolina Cosse	Broad Front	2015	2019
Guillermo Moncecchi	Broad Front	2019	2020
Omar Paganini	National Party	2020	Nov 2023
Elisa Facio	National Party	Nov 2023	March 2025
Fernanda Cardona	Broad Front	March 2025	incumbent

¹ Ministers of the Military-Civic government (1973–1985).

== See also ==
- Mineral industry of Uruguay
- Energy in Uruguay
