= Francisco Bustillo =

Uruguayan diplomat

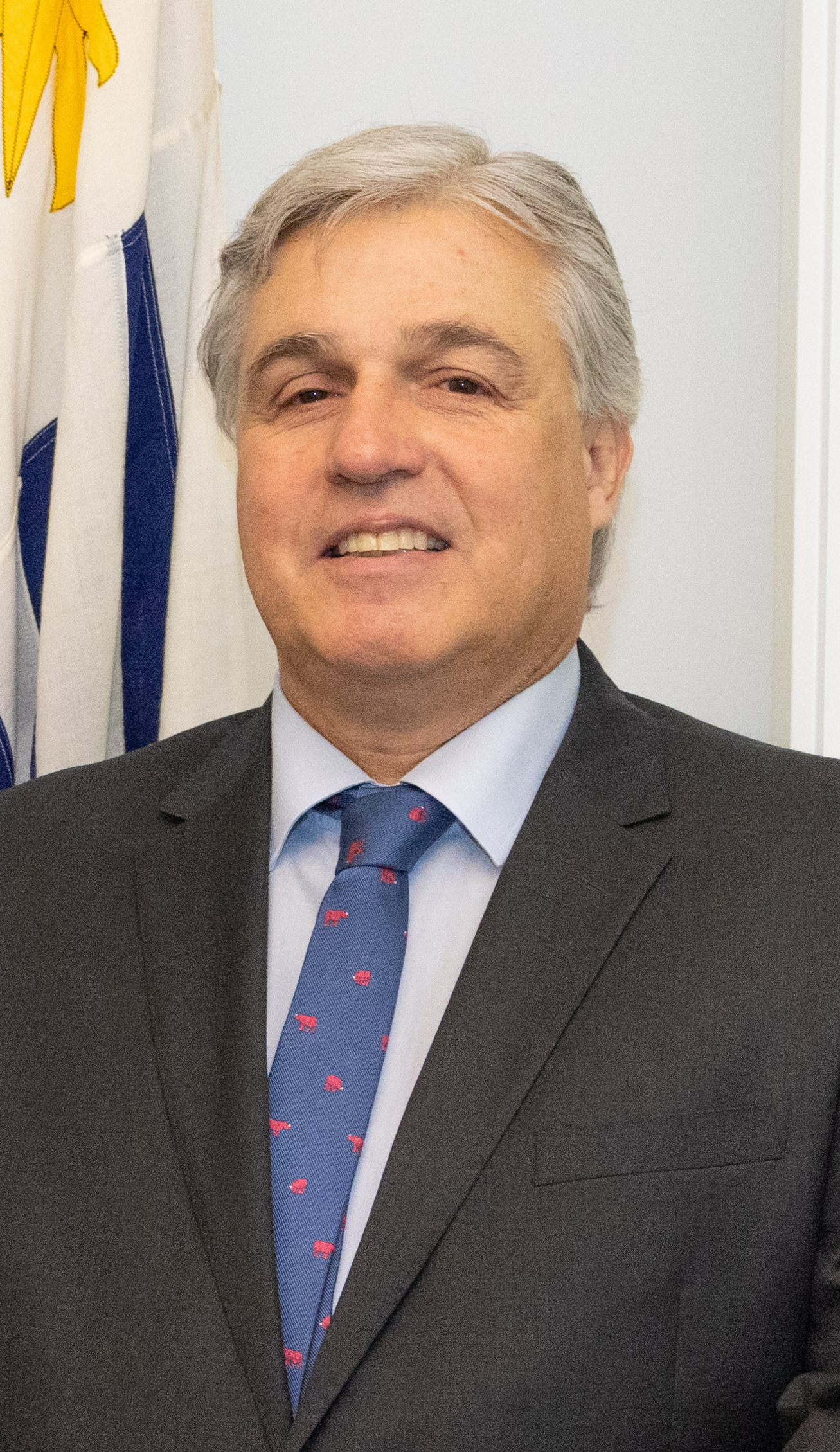
- Francisco Bustillo in 2022

Minister of Foreign Relations of Uruguay
- In office July 6, 2020 – November 1, 2023
- President: Luis Lacalle Pou
- Preceded by: Ernesto Talvi

Uruguay Ambassador to Spain
- In office October 2, 2012 – July 1, 2020
- Preceded by: Carlos Pita

Uruguay Ambassador to Argentina
- In office March 1, 2005 – March 1, 2010
- Succeeded by: Guillermo Pomi

Personal details
- Born: April 1, 1960 (age 66) Montevideo, Uruguay
- Occupation: Diplomat

Francisco Carlos Bustillo Bonasso (born April 1, 1960) is a Uruguayan diplomat who served as Minister of Foreign Relations of Uruguay from July 6, 2020 to November 1, 2023.

Bustillo entered the Ministry of Foreign Affairs of Uruguay by merit competition on January 1, 1986. He has held several positions in Montevideo and abroad, such as the Director of Institutional Affairs and Bilateral Economic Affairs of the Ministry. He was also named Ambassador of Uruguay to Spain in October, 2012.

== Career ==
=== Diplomatic positions ===
On April 1, 2005, he was appointed by President Tabaré Vázquez as Ambassador Extraordinary and Plenipotentiary of Uruguay in Argentine Republic, a position he held for 5 years. In 2010, President José Mujica replaced him with Guillermo Pomi. And on October 2, 2012, he appointed Bustillo as Ambassador of Uruguay to Spain.

=== Political positions ===
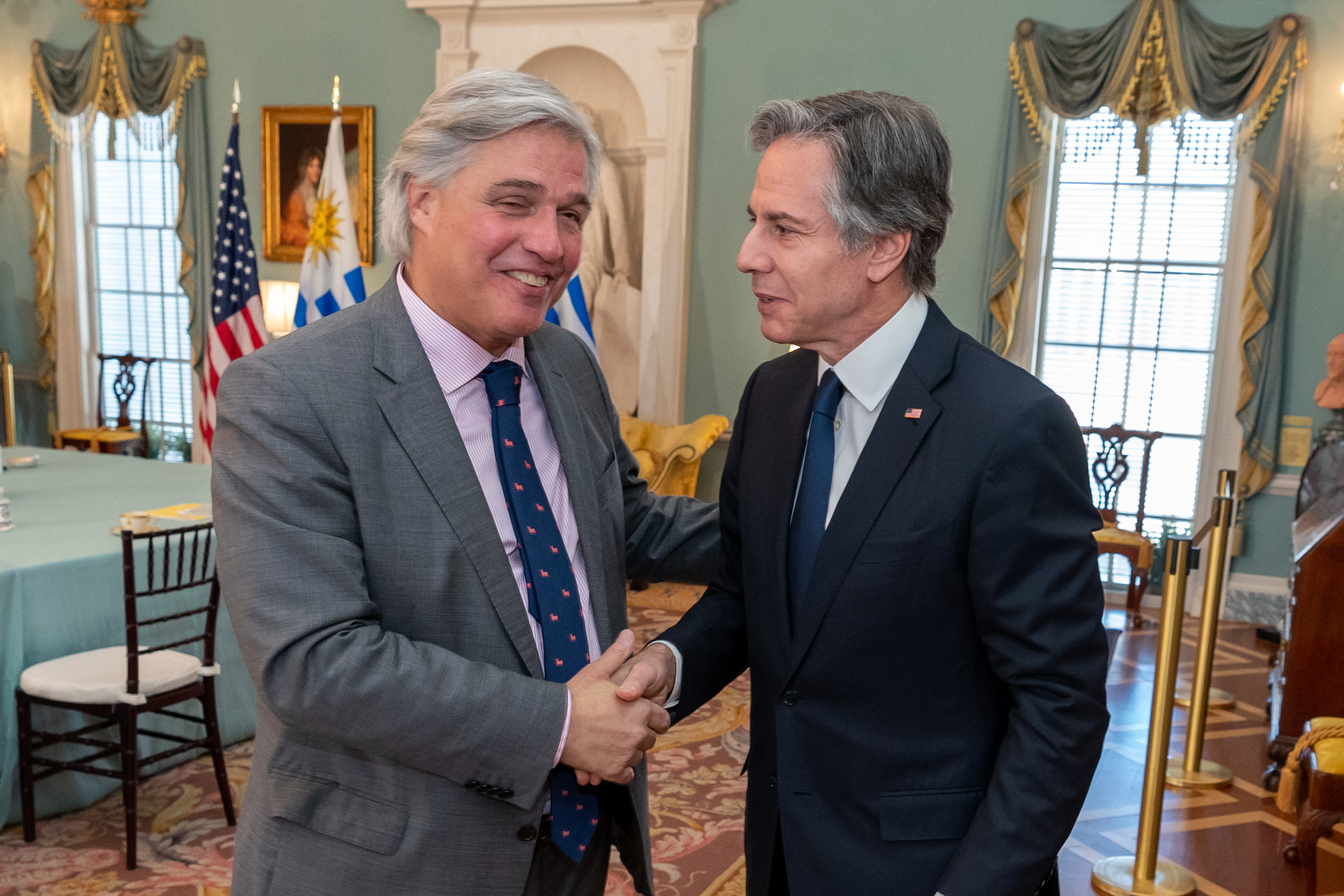
Bustillo with U.S. Secretary of State Antony Blinken in April 2022

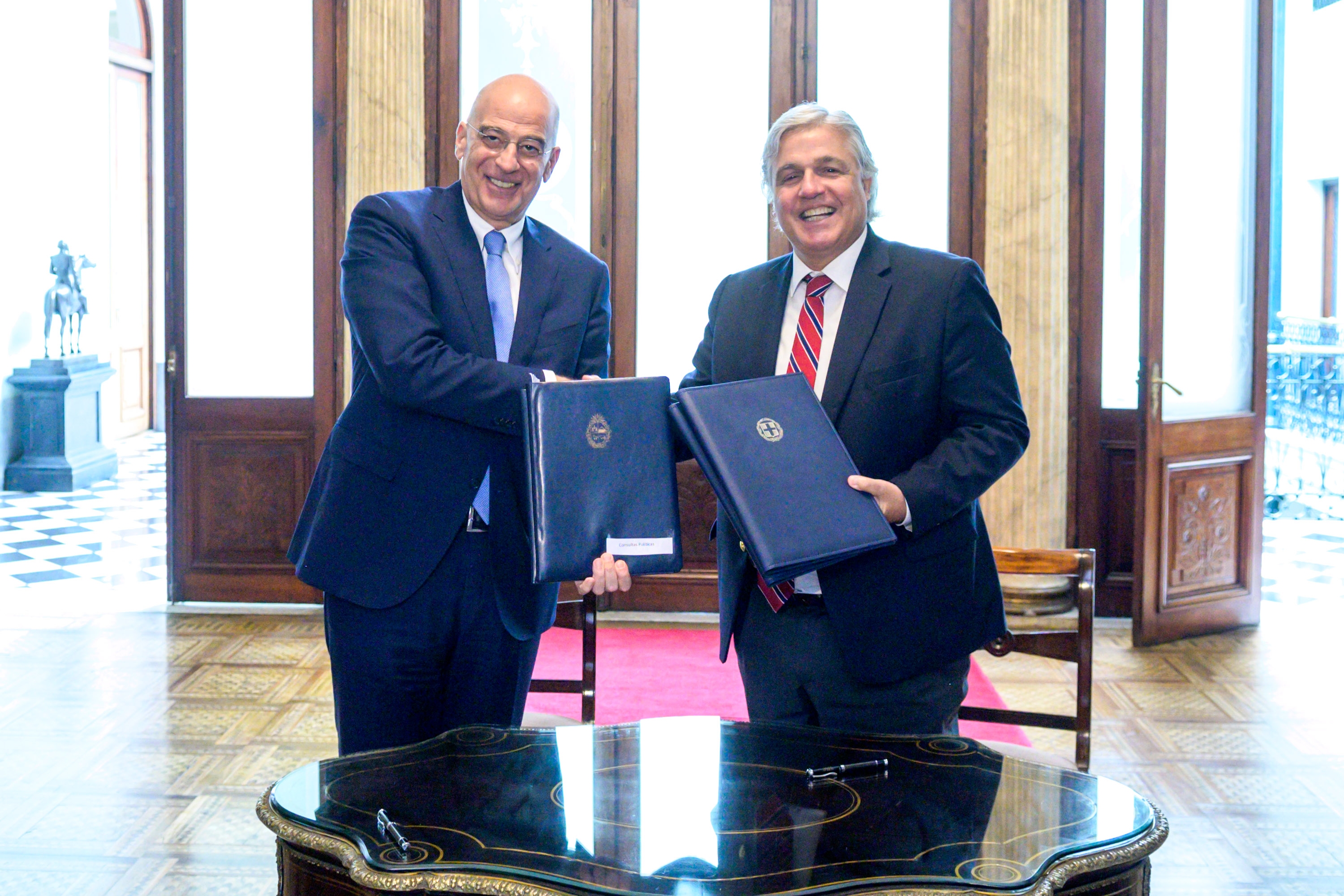
Bustillo with Greek Minister of Foreign Affairs Nikos Dendias in February 2023

In late June 2020, it was confirmed that Bustillo would replace Ernesto Talvi as Minister of Foreign Relations of Uruguay, who presented his resignation, stating "It has been a privilege to serve the citizens of Uruguay from the Foreign Ministry at this time in which it was necessary to face extremely complex challenges". Finally, on July 1, it was confirmed that Bustillo would take office on Monday, July 6. The Deputy Minister of Foreign Affairs is Carolina Ache Batlle.

In September 2020, UN Watch exposed Uruguay’s vote for a UN resolution that singled out Israel alone in the world for supposedly violating women’s rights. Uruguay’s Foreign Minister Francisco Bustillo declared that his country’s UN vote against Israel was a “circumstantial error,” and removed the foreign ministry’s director-general of political affairs, Ambassador Pablo Sader, and that Uruguay’s “foreign policy will keep its historical stance to defend the rights of Israel.”

== Resignation ==
On 1 November 2023, Bustillo resigned as foreign minister after audio messages were published in which he appeared to ask former deputy Foreign Minister Carolina Ache to not hand over her phone to investigators to prevent access to conversations Ache had with another official relating to the granting of a passport to Sebastián Marset, whom the latter official called a "dangerous" drug trafficker, while he was detained in the United Arab Emirates in 2021.
