= Edgardo Ortuño =

Uruguayan educator and politician (born 1970)

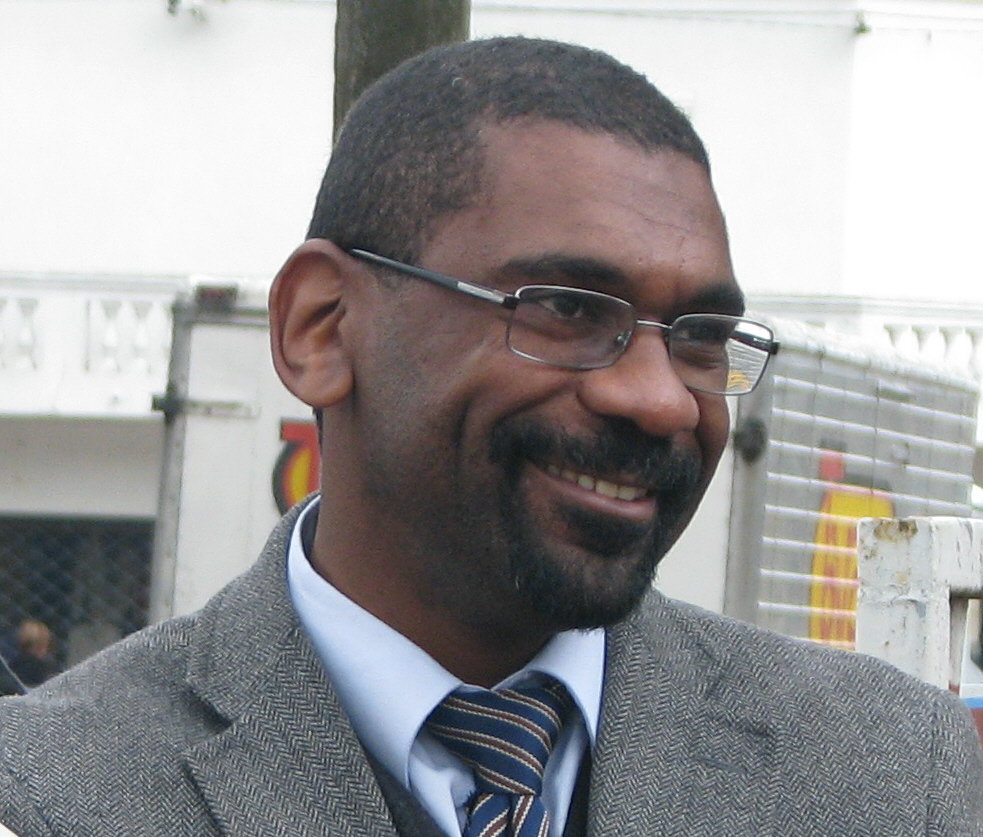
- Ortuño in 2009
- Born: June 10, 1970 (age 56); Montevideo, Uruguay
- Occupations: History teacher; politician; activist
- Political party: Broad Front

Edgardo Ortuño (born 10 June 1970) is a Uruguayan history teacher, politician, and activist. A member of the ruling left-wing Broad Front, he was the first Afro-Uruguayan elected representative.

During the second presidency of Tabaré Vázquez, Ortuño was an interim Minister of Industries. Since 1 March 2025, he is the current Minister of Environment in the cabinet of Yamandú Orsi.
