= Ministry of Environment of Uruguay =

Government ministry of Uruguay

Ministry of Environment
- Ministerio de Ambiente

Ministry overview
- Formed: July 9, 2020
- Jurisdiction: Government of Uruguay
- Headquarters: Montevideo
- Minister responsible: Edgardo Ortuño
- Website: https://www.gub.uy/ministerio-ambiente/

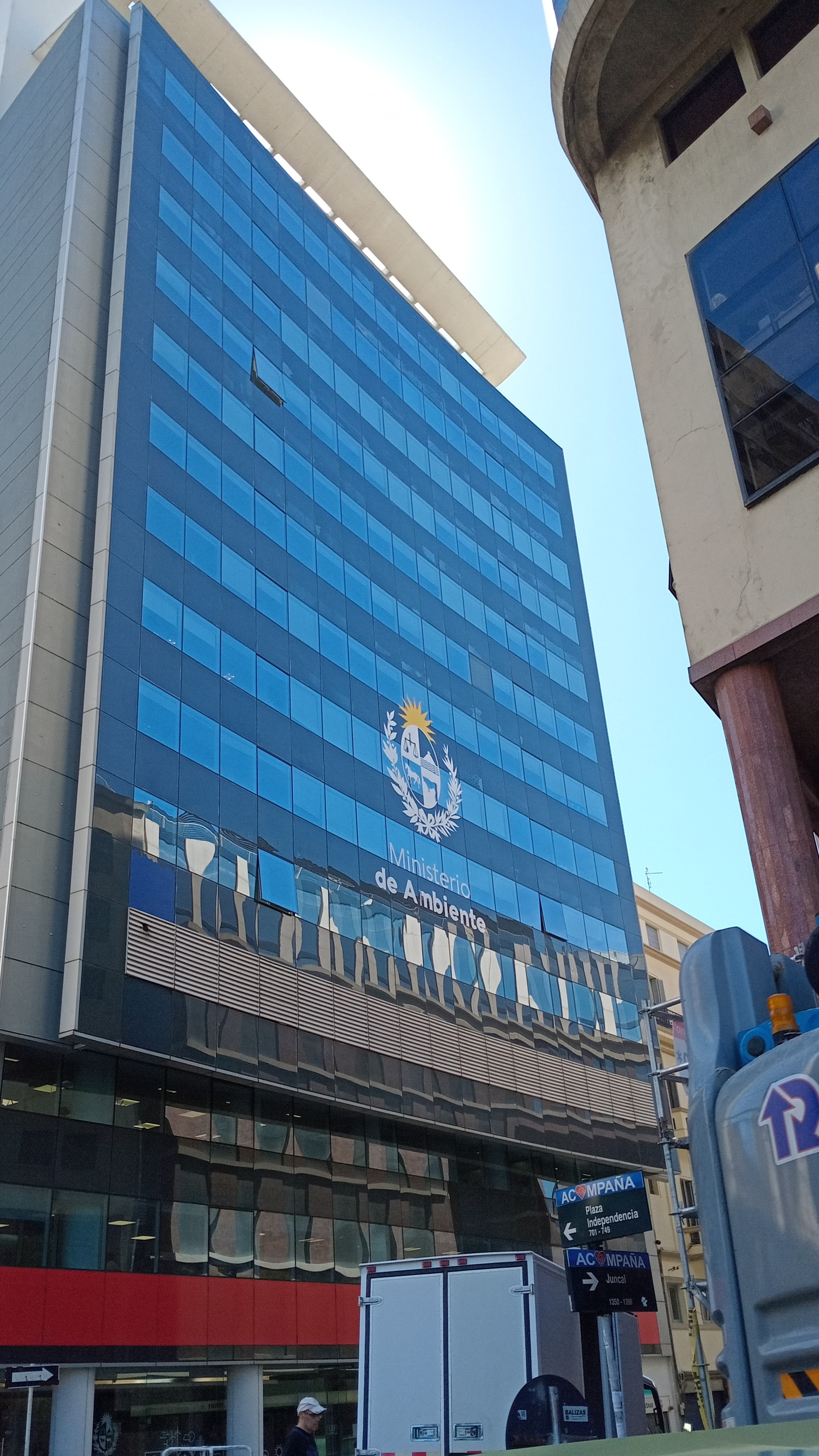

The Ministry of Environment (Spanish: Ministerio de Ambiente) is the Uruguayan government ministry which oversees the environment of Uruguay.

It was created on July 9, 2020, and the current Minister of Environment is Robert Bouvier Torterolo, who has held the position since January 30, 2023.

The ministry oversees the Uruguayan governmental enforcement of the Escazú Agreement which protects environmental defenders and guarantees freedom of information around human rights violations in environmental contexts.

== List of ministers ==
Minister	Began	Ended
Irene Moreira	July 9, 2020	August 27, 2020
Adrián Peña	August 27, 2020	January 30, 2023
Robert Bouvier	January 30, 2023	February 28, 2025
Edgardo Ortuño	March 1, 2025	in office

== See also ==
- Cabinet of Uruguay
- List of ministers of housing, territorial planning and environment (Uruguay)
