= Mineral industry of Uruguay =

Overview of mining in Uruguay

The mining sector contributes only 0.1% to the GDP of Uruguay. Uruguay's mineral commodities include clays, semiprecious gemstones, gold, iron and steel, sand and gravel, and stone. Uruguay has no proven natural gas or oil reserves but it does have substantial hydroelectric capacity.

Artigas Department is well known for its amethyst and agate quartz varieties mining. During 2010s 20 thousand tons of minerals were extracted with a value of 9 million US dollars, exported to Germany, United States, Brazil and China.

Prospecting in the Atlantic coast of Uruguay for fossil fuels, however it has been a controversial practice sparking considerable environmental and social concerns.

== Structure of the Mineral Industry ==
The mineral industry of Uruguay mostly consisted of Uruguayan state-owned firms. The structure of the country's mineral industry could change to a privately owned, government-regulated regime from one that was government owned and government operated. Foreign direct investment (FdI) inflows to Mercosur had a positive effect on Uruguay's FdI inflows, which increased to $1.4 billion in 2006 from $847.4 million in 2005, and that mostly reflected the high international prices of several commodities, such as cement, steel, sugar, textiles, and wood products.

== Commodities ==
=== Gold ===
In 2006, gold production in Uruguay remained at about the same level as that of 2005.

=== Iron and Steel ===
Uruguay produced 57,000 t of crude steel in 2006 compared with 64,000 t in 2005, which was a decrease of 10.9%. The increase in metal prices and higher output of iron ore did not provide the necessary boost to the steel sector. according to the Uruguayan Dirección Nacional de Minería y Geología, the country produced 15,525 t of iron ore in 2006 compared with 12,436 t in 2005, which was an increase of almost 25%.

=== Natural gas ===
In June 2006, the administración nacional de Combustibles, alcohol y Portland (anCaP) announced the completion of an appraisal of natural gas reserves in Uruguay's offshore Punta del Este basin. according to anCaP, the basin contained at least 28 to 57 cubic kilometres (1×10^{12} to 2×10^{12} cu ft) of potential reserves and first production could take place as early as 2015 provided that exploration takes place in the basin.

Two natural gas pipelines connect Uruguay and Argentina. The first, Cr. Federico Slinger or gasoducto del Litoral, which runs 19 kilometres (12 mi) from Colon, Argentina, to Paysandú, Uruguay, was constructed and operated by anCaP and had an operating capacity of 140,000 cubic metres (4.9×10^{6} cu ft) per day. The second, the gasoducto Cruz del Sur (gCdS), was operated by a consortium led by British Gas group (Bg group). This pipeline extends 210 kilometres (130 mi) from Argentina's natural gas grid to Montevideo and has a capacity of 5,100,000 cubic metres (180×10^{6} cu ft) per day. The gCdS-Bg group project also held a concession for a possible pipeline extension of 870 kilometres (540 mi) to Porto alegre, Brazil. Argentina, however, had begun to disrupt its natural gas exports to Chile and Uruguay because of natural gas output shortages. as a result, Uruguay approached the Bolivian government to discuss the possibility of direct supply of natural gas. In March 2006, both governments agreed to conduct a feasibility study of such a plan.

=== Petroleum ===
Uruguay is a petroleum importing country, and most of the industry is controlled by the state-owned company ANCAP. ANCAP operates both the only refinery in Uruguay, La Teja Refinery, and the distribution of gas within the country.

In 2025, the government authorised projects submitted by seismic exploration companies on Uruguay's offshore platform. Environmental NGOs oppose these projects and are taking legal action to prevent their implementation, considering them harmful to the environment.
