= President of Uruguay =

Head of state and government

President of the Oriental Republic of Uruguay
- Presidente de la República Oriental del Uruguay
- Coat of arms of Uruguay

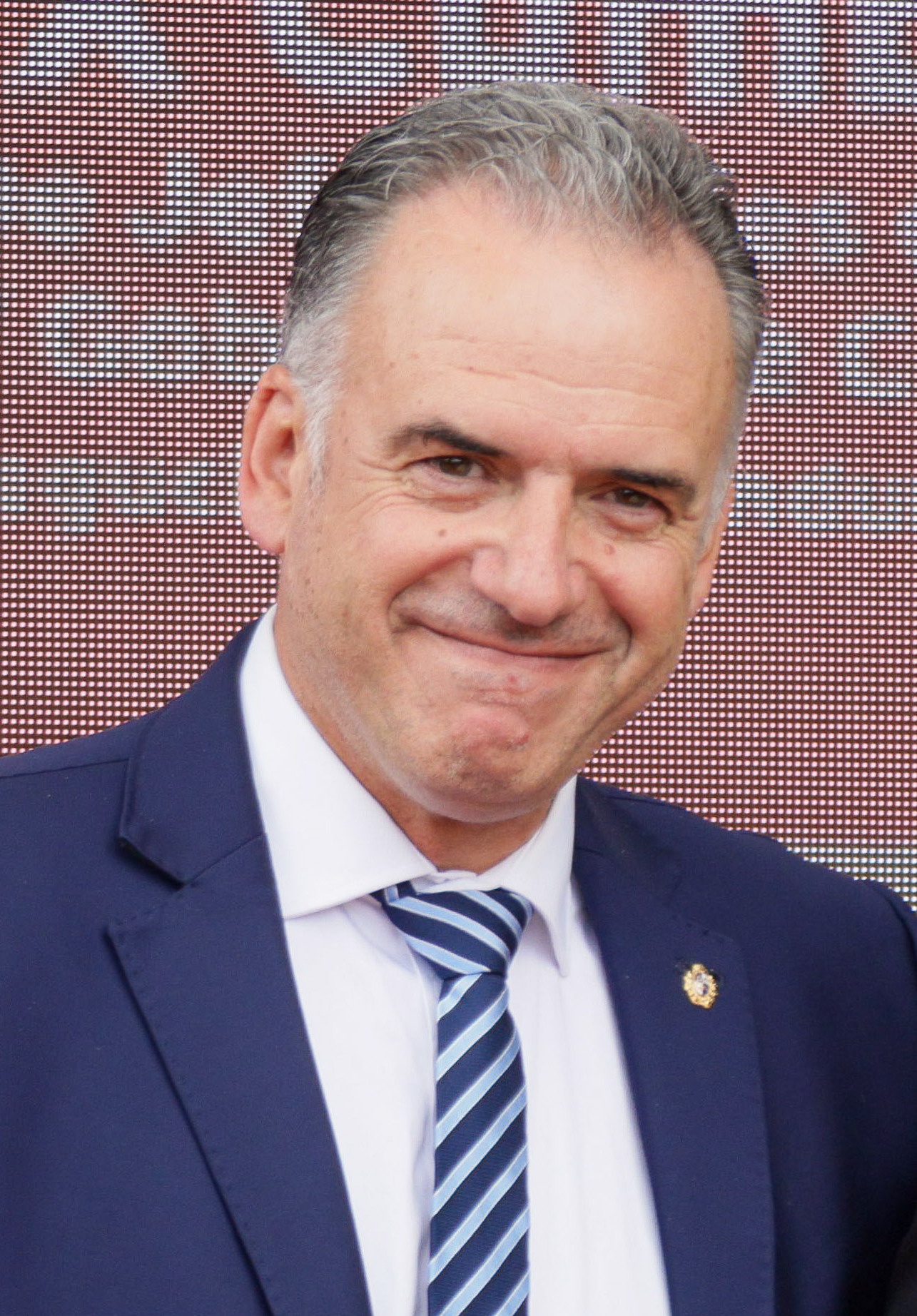
- Incumbent; Yamandú Orsi since 1 March 2025
- Style: Mr./Madam President (Señor/a Presidente/a) (informal); President of the Republic (Presidente/a de la República) (formal); The Most Excellent (Excelentísimo/a Señor/a) (diplomatic)
- Status: Head of state Head of government
- Residence: Residencia de Suárez
- Seat: Executive Tower, Montevideo
- Appointer: Direct Popular Vote (two rounds if necessary)
- Term length: Five years, renewable non consecutively
- Constituting instrument: Constitution of Uruguay (1830)
- Inaugural holder: Fructuoso Rivera
- Formation: November 6, 1830 (195 years ago)
- Deputy: Vice President of Uruguay
- Salary: $U403,242/US$ 10,339 per month
- Website: presidencia.gub.uy

The president of Uruguay (Spanish: presidente de Uruguay), officially known as the president of the Oriental Republic of Uruguay (presidente de la República Oriental del Uruguay), is the head of state and head of government of Uruguay. The president presides over the Council of Ministers, directing the executive branch of the national government, and is the commander-in-chief of the Armed Forces.

The powers and duties of the presidency are established in Section IX of the Constitution of the Republic. Together with the Secretariat of the Presidency, the Council of Ministers, and the Office of Planning and Budget, the presidency forms part of the executive branch of government. In the event of a temporary or permanent vacancy, the office is assumed by the vice president, who is elected on the same ticket as the president.

The president serves a five-year term and is not eligible for immediate re-election. Yamandú Orsi is the 43rd and current president since March 1, 2025.

== Features of the office ==
=== Requirements ===
The Constitution amendment establishes the requirements for becoming president. Article 151 establishes that the president must be a natural-born citizen of the country, or have been born to a Uruguayan citizen if born abroad. The president must also be at least 35 years old and be registered in the National Civic Registry.

=== Election ===
Article 151 establishes that the president, together with the vice president, is elected by direct popular vote for a five-year term, by an absolute majority of votes. A person may be reelected to the presidency any number of times, but is ineligible for immediate reelection. The president and vice president run on a single ticket submitted by their party. If no candidate obtains an absolute majority (50% + 1), a runoff is held between the two candidates who received the highest number of votes. In this case, the candidate who obtains a plurality in the runoff is elected.

== Succession ==
Article 153 of the Constitution establishes that, in the event of the president and vice president's absence, resignation, removal, or death, the Presidency of the Republic shall be assumed by the first titular senator on the electoral list of the political party that received the highest number of votes and by which they were elected.

== Residence ==
The Suárez Residence, located in Montevideo, serves as the official residence of the president. The property was built between 1907 and 1908 for the prominent Lerena Fein family, who commissioned the young architect Juan María Aubriot to design a three-storey residence. In 1925, Luis Batlle Berres and Matilde Ibáñez Tálice met while walking past the residence; they married shortly thereafter. By 1947, when Batlle Berres had become head of state, the couple selected the mansion as the presidential residence, reportedly due to its personal significance.

The Anchorena Presidential Estate, located in Colonia Department on the banks of the San Juan River near its mouth into the Río de la Plata, serves as the president’s country residence. It also encompasses a national park of about 1,370 hectares (3,400 acres) and is used for informal gatherings, cabinet meetings—particularly during the summer months—and the reception of foreign dignitaries.

The president also has a vacation residence in Punta del Este known as "Woodland’s", a mansion that has served this purpose since the 1940s. The property was donated to the Uruguayan state by businessman Mauricio Litman, who developed the city’s Cantegril Country Club.

Presidential residences

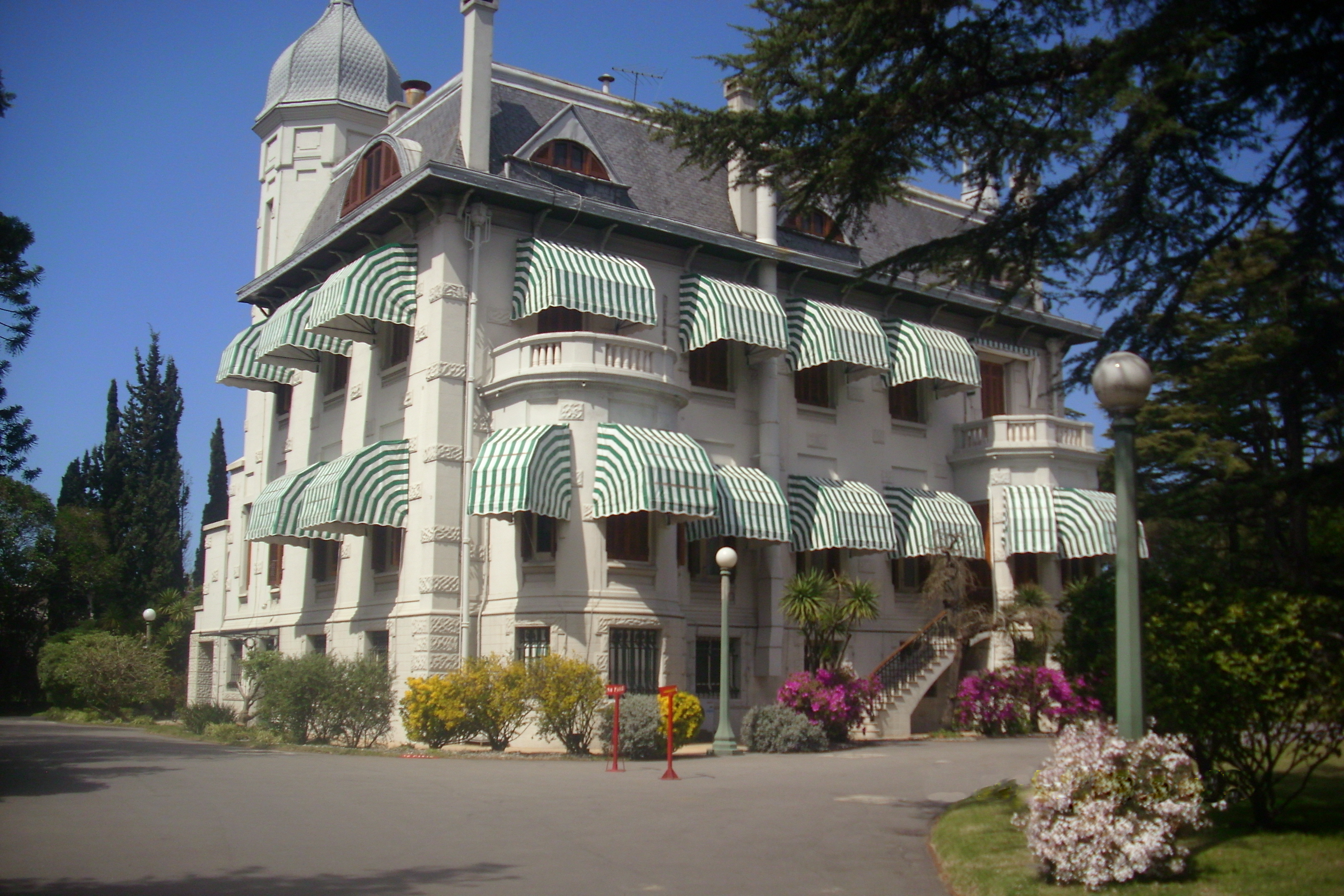
Residencia de Suárez, the official residence

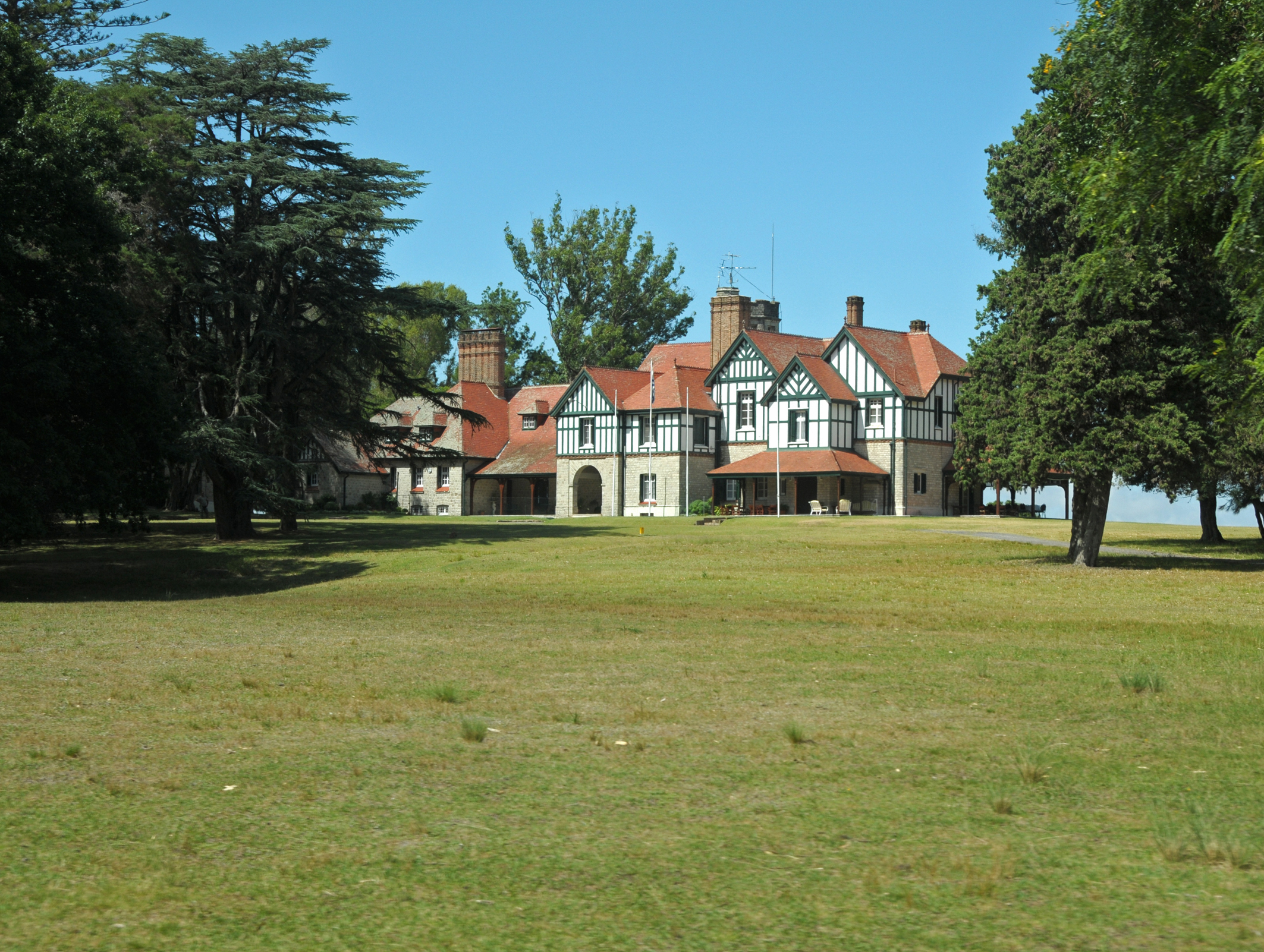
Anchorena Presidential Estate, the official retreat

== Honors ==
=== Territorial entities ===
- Flores Department.
- Rivera Department.
- Baltasar Brum, Artigas Department.
- Joaquín Suárez, Canelones Department.
- José Batlle y Ordóñez, Lavalleja Department.
- Tomás Gomensoro, Artigas Department.

=== Public spaces ===
As a general rule, regulations do not allow public spaces or works to be named after living former presidents or any other person who has not previously died, and only after a period of time that may vary depending on the location within the territory.

- Several squares, parks, roads and streets throughout the country are named after former leaders.
  - Unusually, in 1901 a street was named after President Juan Lindolfo Cuestas while in office.
- The only heads of state from the 19th century who have not been honoured in this way are Juan Idiarte Borda and Duncan Stewart.
- After Óscar Gestido, no deceased 20th-century heads of state have been honoured with their names on streets or other public places. But Jorge Batlle has an avenue named after him in the city of Tacuarembó.
- Several national routes are named after presidents:
  - Route 1, Manuel Oribe;
  - Route 5, Fructuoso Rivera;
  - Route 6, Joaquín Suárez;
  - Route 11, José Batlle y Ordóñez (except for the section from km 163.500 and the intersection with the Ruta Interbalnearia);
  - Route 14, Venancio Flores;
  - Route 19, Lorenzo Latorre (section between Route 14 and Route 6).

=== Buildings ===
- Máximo Santos had his lavish residence built in the center of Montevideo, which later passed to the State. It is currently occupied by the Foreign Office. Both the building and, by extension, the Ministry of Foreign Affairs are known as the Santos Palace.
- Several schools all over the country bear the names of presidents.

== See also ==
- History of Uruguay
- Politics of Uruguay
- List of presidents of Uruguay
