= Éric Brian =

French sociologist (1958–2025)

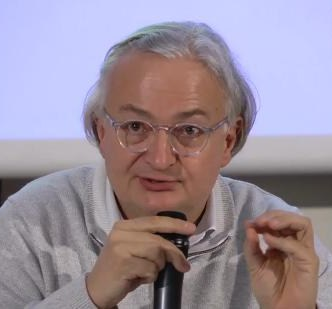
- Brian in 2010
- Born: 23 June 1958; Bourges, France
- Died: 13 August 2025 (aged 67); Paris, France
- Education: École polytechnique, University of Paris-Sud, School for Advanced Studies in the Social Sciences
- Scientific career
- Fields: sociology of science, sociology of knowledge
- Institutions: Centre Maurice Halbwachs, School for Advanced Studies in the Social Sciences, University of Vienna
- Website: http://crh.ehess.fr/index.php?8318

Éric Brian (23 June 1958 – 13 August 2025) was a French historian of science and a sociologist. He studied the uncertainty and regularity of social phenomena, and in particular, how scientists have caught and conceived them as objects of mathematics or social and economic sciences.

He was senior professor at EHESS (École des hautes études en sciences sociales, Paris, France). Since 1995, he was the editor of the Revue de synthèse today published at Brill Publishers (Paris). In the Fall of 1994, Brian was a Fellow at the Swedish Collegium for Advanced Study in Uppsala, Sweden. Between 1997 and 2018, he taught at the University of Vienna (Austria).

He died on 13 August 2025.

== Selected publications ==
- Brian, Éric (2024). Are Statistics Only Made of Data?: Know-How and Presupposition from the 17th and 19th Centuries. Methodos Series. Vol. 20. Springer International Publishing. doi:10.1007/978-3-031-51254-4. ISBN 978-3-031-51253-7.
- Fréchet, Maurice; Halbwachs, Maurice (2019). Le Calcul des probabilités à la portée de tous (in French). Strasbourg: Presses universitaires de Strasbourg. ISBN 9791034400096.
- Durkheim, Émile; Mauss, Marcel (2017) [1903]. De quelques formes primitives de classification (in French). Paris: Presses universitaires de France.
- Brian, Éric, ed. (2012). "Sociologie générale, éléments nouveaux". Revue de synthèse (in French). 133 (1).
- Brian, Éric; Boudia, Soraya, eds. (2011). "Social Memory and Hyper Modernity". International Social Science Journal. 62 (203–204). Unesco.
- Brian, Éric (2009). Comment tremble la main invisible. Incertitude et marchés (in French). Paris: Springer Verlag.
- Brian, Éric; Walter, Christian, eds. (2007). Critique de la valeur fondamentale (in French). Paris: Springer Verlag.
- Brian, Éric; Jaisson, Marie (2007). Le Sexisme de la première heure. Hasard et sociologie (in French). Paris: Raisons d'agir.
- Brian, Éric; Jaisson, Marie (2007). The Descent of Human Sex Ratio at Birth. A Dialogue between Mathematics, Biology and Sociology. Dordrecht: Springer Verlag.
- Halbwachs, Maurice (2005). Brian, Éric; Jaisson, Marie (eds.). Le Point de vue du nombre (1936) (in French). Paris: éditions de l'Ined.
- Condorcet (2004). Schandeler, Jean-Pierre; Crépel, Pierre (eds.). Tableau historique de l'esprit humain. Projets, Esquisse, Fragments et Notes (1772-1794) (in French). Paris: éditions de l'Ined.
- Brian, Éric; Demeulenaere-Douyère, Christiane, eds. (2002). Règlement, usages et science dans la France de l'Absolutisme (in French). Paris: éditions Technique & Documentation.
- Brian, Éric (2001). Staatsvermessungen. Condorcet, Laplace, Turgot und das Denken der Verwaltung (in German). Wien: Springer Verlag.
- Brian, Éric; Demeulenaere-Douyère, Christiane, eds. (1996). Histoire et mémoire de l'Académie des sciences. Guide de recherches (in French). Paris: éditions Technique & Documentation.
- Brian, Éric, ed. (1996). "Henri Berr et la culture du XXe s. Histoire, science et philosophie". Revue de synthèse (in French). 117 (1–2).
- Brian, Éric (1994). La Mesure de l'État. Administrateurs et géomètres au XVIIIe siècle (in French). Paris: Albin Michel.
