= Robert Bouvier (Swiss philosopher) =

Swiss philosopher

- Born: 1886; Switzerland
- Died: 1978 (aged 91–92)
- Occupation: philosopher
- Known for: popularising the work of Ernst Mach in French
- Notable work: La Pensée de Ernst Mach: Essai de biographie intellectuelle et critique

Robert Bouvier (1886–1978) was a Swiss philosopher noted for popularising the work of Ernst Mach in French.

Bouvier spent much his career teaching evening classes and doing translation work before becoming a privatdocent at the University of Geneva.

== Publications ==
- (1923) La Pensée de Ernst Mach: Essai de biographie intellectuelle et critique Paris: Vélin d'Or
