= Guillermo Pomi =

Uruguayan diplomat

Guillermo Pomi (born in 1951) is a Uruguayan economist and diplomat.

He was Uruguayan ambassador to South Africa.

Since 2010 he has been Ambassador of Uruguay to Argentina.
