= Carlos Pita (politician) =

Uruguayan physician, politician and diplomat

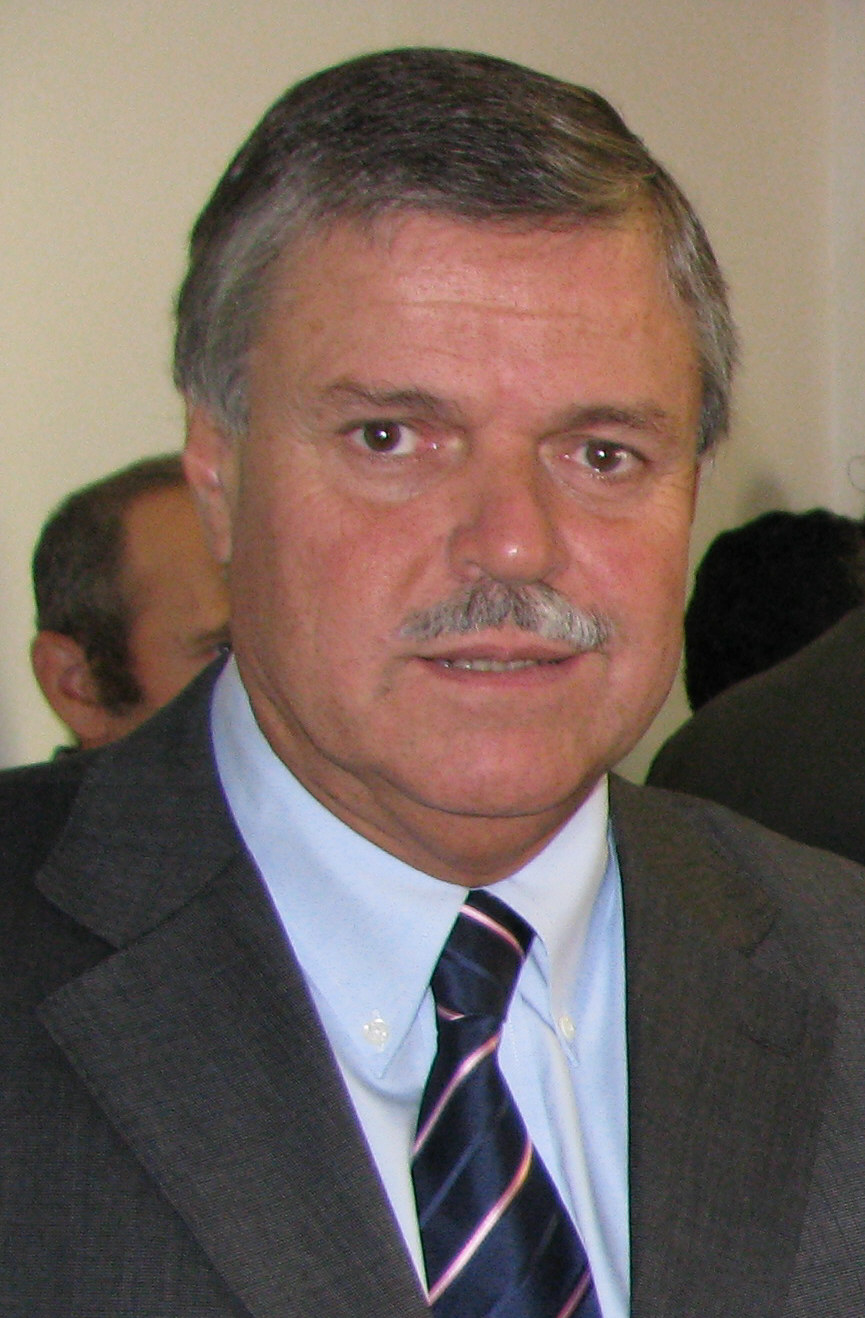
- Carlos Pita in 2010
- Born: Juan Carlos Pita Alvariza; 1951 (age 74–75); Montevideo, Uruguay
- Education: University of the Republic
- Occupations: Neurology, politician and diplomat
- Political party: National Party; Broad Front
- Spouses: Alicia Magnou; Mariella Mora
- Children: Libertad, Ana Laura, Patricia y Josefina
- Parent: Américo Pita

Juan Carlos Pita Alvariza (born 1951 in Montevideo) is a Uruguayan physician, politician and diplomat.

== Background and earlier life ==
Pita graduated as a doctor from the Faculty of Medicine of the University of the Republic. At the age of 17 he started his political affiliation in the National Party supporting Wilson Ferreira Aldunate. He was strongly against the civic-military dictatorship and formed the Popular Nationalistic Current during those years.

== Political career ==
In 1984, he was elected deputy for Montevideo as part of the For the Fatherland movement.

in 1987 he joined the Broad Front.

He was a representative from 1985 to 2005.

He was appointed Uruguayan ambassador to Chile. Later he was appointed as Uruguayan ambassador to Spain.

== Ambassador ==
In 2012 he was appointed ambassador of Uruguay to the United States.

== Family life ==
He married Alicia Magnou and had three daughters: Libertad, Ana Laura and Patricia. He was divorced and then married Mariella Mora, with whom he had a fourth daughter, Josefina.

== See also ==
- United States–Uruguay relations
