= List of hospitals in Uruguay =

This is a list of hospitals in Uruguay.

== Montevideo ==
=== Public hospitals ===
Most of the twelve public hospitals in the Montevideo Department are administered by the State Health Services Administration (ASSE). Exceptions include the teaching hospital, the Canzani Sanatorium, and hospitals dedicated to the care of armed forces personnel, police officers, and workers injured in occupational accidents.

Imagen	Name	Type	Administrator
	Hospital de Clínicas	Teaching hospital	University of the Republic
	Hospital Maciel	General hospital	State Health Services Administration
	Hospital Vilardebó	Psychiatric hospital	State Health Services Administration
	Hospital Pereira Rossell	Pediatric hospital	State Health Services Administration
	Spanish Hospital	General hospital	State Health Services Administration
	Hospital Saint Bois	General hospital	State Health Services Administration
	Hospital Pasteur	General hospital	State Health Services Administration
	Hospital Piñeyro del Campo	Geriatric hospital	State Health Services Administration
	Hospital Banco de Seguros del Estado	Specialized hospital	Banco de Seguros del Estado
	Central Hospital of the Armed Forces	General hospital	Directorate of Health of the Armed Forces
	Police Hospital	General hospital	Directorate of Police Health

There are also departmental hospitals, and a set of primary care centers, with emergency services and family medicine. In the case of the department and city of Montevideo, there is a network of 95 state polyclinics distributed in different neighborhoods of Montevideo. To this are added the 21 neighborhood polyclinics, managed by the Department of Health of the Municipality of Montevideo, these are mostly located in neighborhoods with critical contexts. There are also maternal and child centers, today called the Bank of Social Security.

=== Private hospitals ===
There are also, and mainly in Montevideo, a set of medical assistance corporations. Which are called mutualists.

Date	Name	Locality
1853	Asociación Española de Socorros Mutuos	Montevideo
1857	British Hospital	Montevideo
1858	Italian Hospital of Montevideo	Montevideo
	Centro Asistencial del Sindicato Médico del Uruguay	Montevideo
	Médica Uruguaya	Montevideo
	Cantegril Sanatorium	Maldonado
	Sanatorium Mautone	Maldonado
	Evangelical Hospital	Montevideo
	Catholic Circle of Workers	Montevideo
	American Sanitarium	Montevideo
