= Hospital Filtro =

- State Health Services Administration
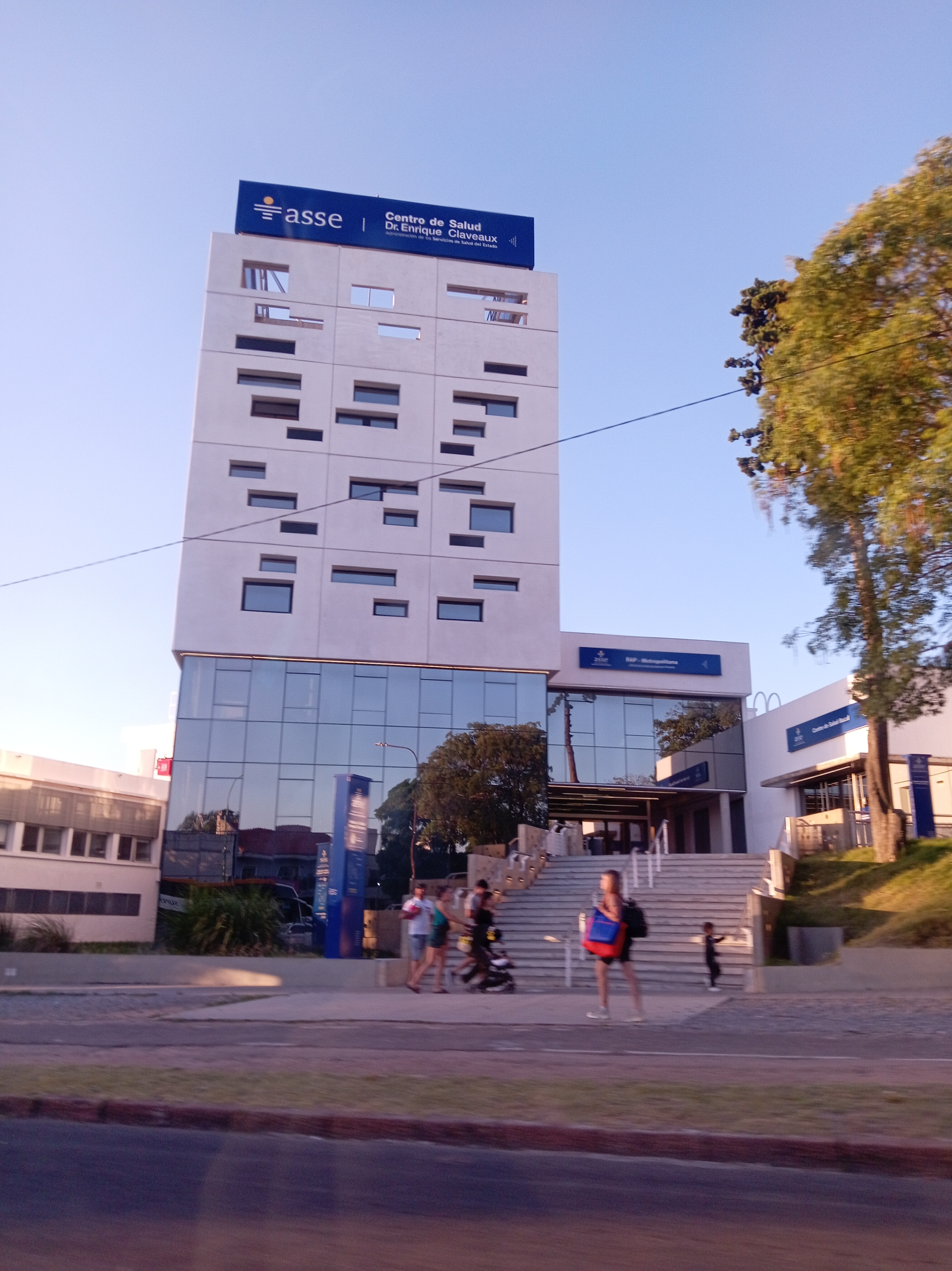
- The centre in 2025

Geography
- Location: 3661 Pampillo y Novas St., Montevideo, Uruguay

History
- Founded: 1940

Links
- Lists: Hospitals in Uruguay

The Enrique Claveaux Health Center, commonly known as Hospital Filtro, is a public medical center in Montevideo, Uruguay. The institution, located in the Jacinto Vera neighborhood, was established in the 1940s, while its current facilities were inaugurated in 2024 following a major renovation.

Administered by the State Health Services Administration, the center includes a dental health facility, outpatient clinics, specialty services, and an emergency medical services base equipped with ambulances for adult and pediatric care. It also functions as a reference facility for mental health, includes a specialized pediatric unit focused on environmental health, and provides laboratory services, care for cases of gender-based violence, pharmacy services, and community and family medicine.

== History ==
Hospital Filtro was established in the 1940s, when Enrique Claveaux, then Minister of Public Health, promoted the construction of a small quarantine facility for the observation and treatment of infectious diseases, with authorization from President Alfredo Baldomir. After the initial health emergency subsided, the facility lost much of its original function. In 1955, amid a severe poliomyelitis outbreak that increasingly affected adolescents and young adults, the institution was repurposed as a specialized hospital for the treatment of the disease, following an initiative supported by First Lady Matilde Ibáñez Tálice. Claveaux had taken steps in preparation for a possible outbreak and facilitated the acquisition of equipment to address it.

From the late 1950s and early 1960s, the hospital became a pioneer in Uruguay in the development of prolonged mechanical ventilation for non-paralytic respiratory conditions, marking an important stage in the evolution of intensive respiratory care in the country. In later decades, particularly from the 1970s through the mid-1980s, the institution experienced a period of decline and deterioration in its infrastructure.

On 24 August 1994, the area surrounding the hospital was the scene of unrest and violent clashes between protesters and police after demonstrators attempted to prevent the extradition to Spain of three Spanish citizens of Basque origin who were accused of belonging to the Euskadi Ta Askatasuna (ETA) organization. The three individuals were being treated at the facility following a hunger strike.

In April 2022, the hospital, which served approximately 18,000 people, was closed. Renovation and expansion works began in June of that year, with an investment of $ 300 million, including the construction of 31 new consultation rooms, an expansion of specialty services, the installation of medical imaging equipment, and the establishment of a telemedicine center to provide specialist care to patients from other regions of the country. The project also included the creation of a reference center for the National Oral Health Program.

The new facility, renamed Centro de Salud Dr. Enrique Claveaux, was incorporated as a primary care center within the metropolitan network of the State Health Services Administration. While the institution had previously operated within the same network, in this new stage it was designated as a central facility of the system, concentrating several of the administration’s main offices within its premises. The center was inaugurated on 8 April 2024 by President Luis Lacalle Pou.
