= Daniel Salinas =

Uruguayan neurologist and politician

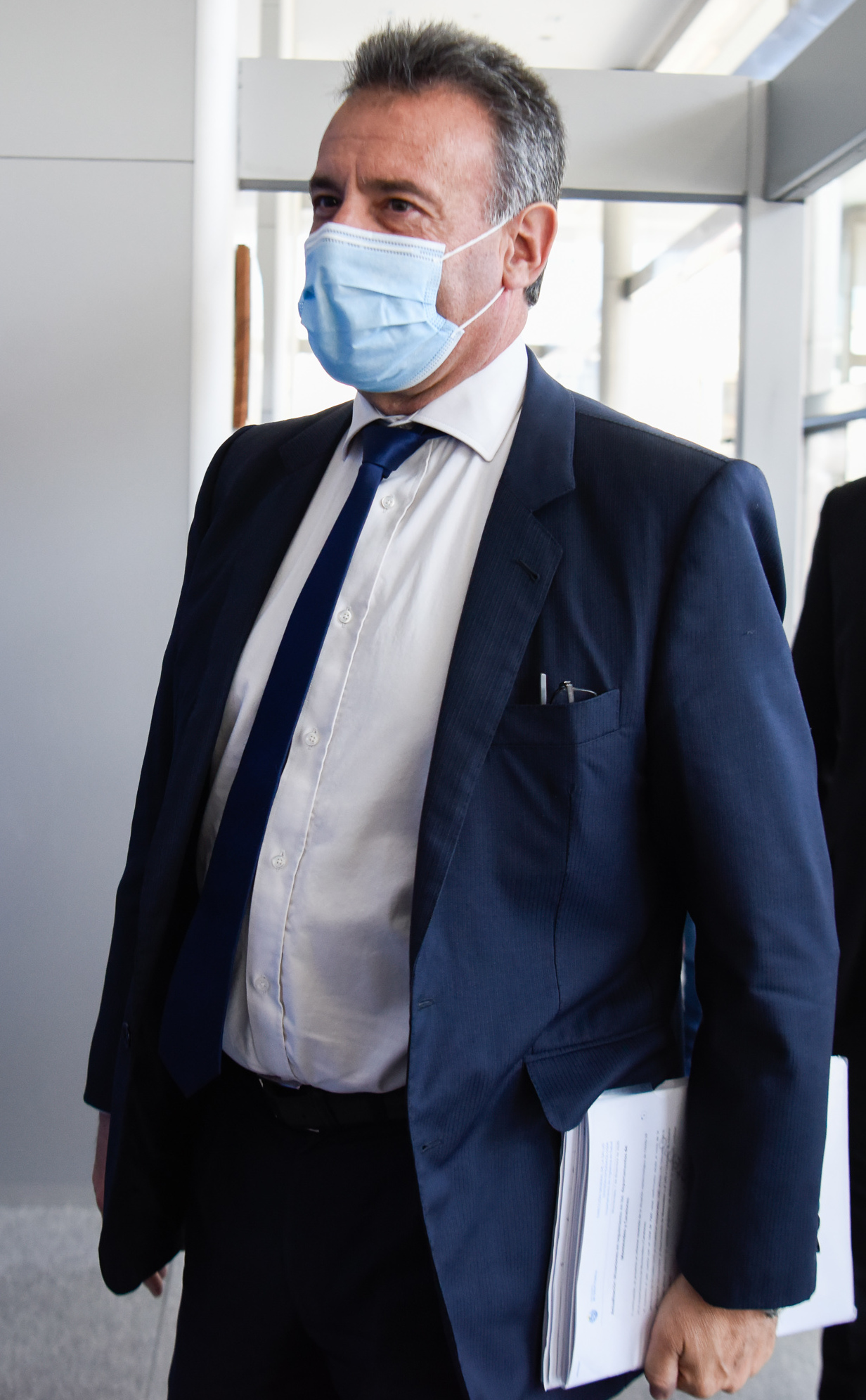
- Daniel Salinas in 2020.

Minister of Public Health of Uruguay
- In office 1 March 2020 – 13 March 2023
- President: Luis Lacalle Pou
- Preceded by: Jorge Basso
- Succeeded by: Karina Rando

Personal details
- Born: Julio Daniel Salinas Grecco; 17 February 1962 (age 64) San José de Mayo, Uruguay
- Party: Open Cabildo
- Education: University of the Republic
- Occupation: Neurologist; Politician

Julio Daniel Salinas Grecco (born 17 February 1962) is a Uruguayan neurologist and former politician, who served as Minister of Public Health of Uruguay from 1 March 2020 to 13 March 2023.

Graduated from the University of the Republic in 1988, he has the degree of Doctor of Medicine. In 2008 he obtained a bachelor's degree in neurology. In 2012 he obtained a master's degree in Health Business Management from the University of Montevideo and in 2018 a master's degree in Innovation and Entrepreneurship from the University of Barcelona. He also has a Diploma in Sleep Medicine from the Faculty of Medicine of Latin American Center for Human Economy (CLAEH).

After leaving government service, he was announced in April 2023 as the new dean of the Faculty of Health Sciences of the Catholic University of Uruguay, a position he held until August 2026.

== Early life ==
Raised in San José de Mayo, he is the eldest son of two teachers; his father was chairman of the San José Department of Teaching Union. He started working at the age of thirteen mending shoes in his hometown.

== Career ==
In the practice of medicine, he worked in different health centers, such as the Círculo Católico de Obreros del Uruguay, Central Hospital of the Armed Forces and Casa de Galicia. Between 2012 and 2018 he served as head of the Electroencephalography Service at Vilardebó Hospital, while between 2009 and 2019 as manager of Material Resources of the Uruguay Medical Union Assistance Center (CASMU).

== Minister of Health ==
Salinas was appointed Minister of Public Health on December 16, 2019, as a member of Open Cabildo, a party within the electoral coalition, Coalición Multicolor. He took office on March 1, in replacement of Jorge Basso.

=== Coronavirus pandemic ===
The COVID-19 pandemic emerged within the first days of the administration. The first cases were reported on 13 March 2020 by the Ministry of Public Health. On March 14, public performances were canceled and some public places were closed. Local transmission was established with two non-imported cases reported on 15 March. The first patients showed mild symptoms of COVID-19.

When Salimas left the role of minister he noted that he was leaving politics. He had found the attention by anti-vaccine groups upsetting when he was called a "genocidal traitor". He was replaced by Karina Rando.
