= Asociación Española =

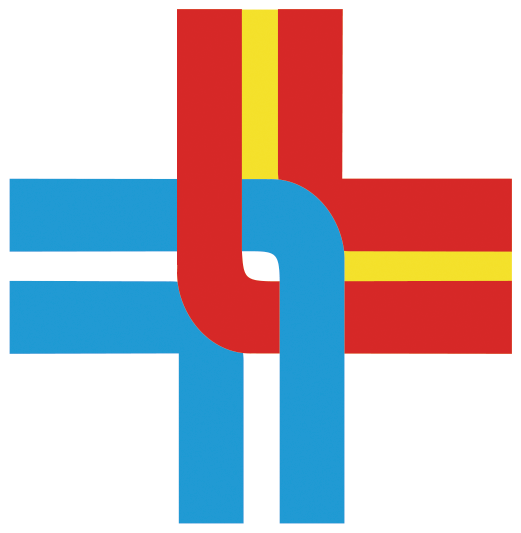

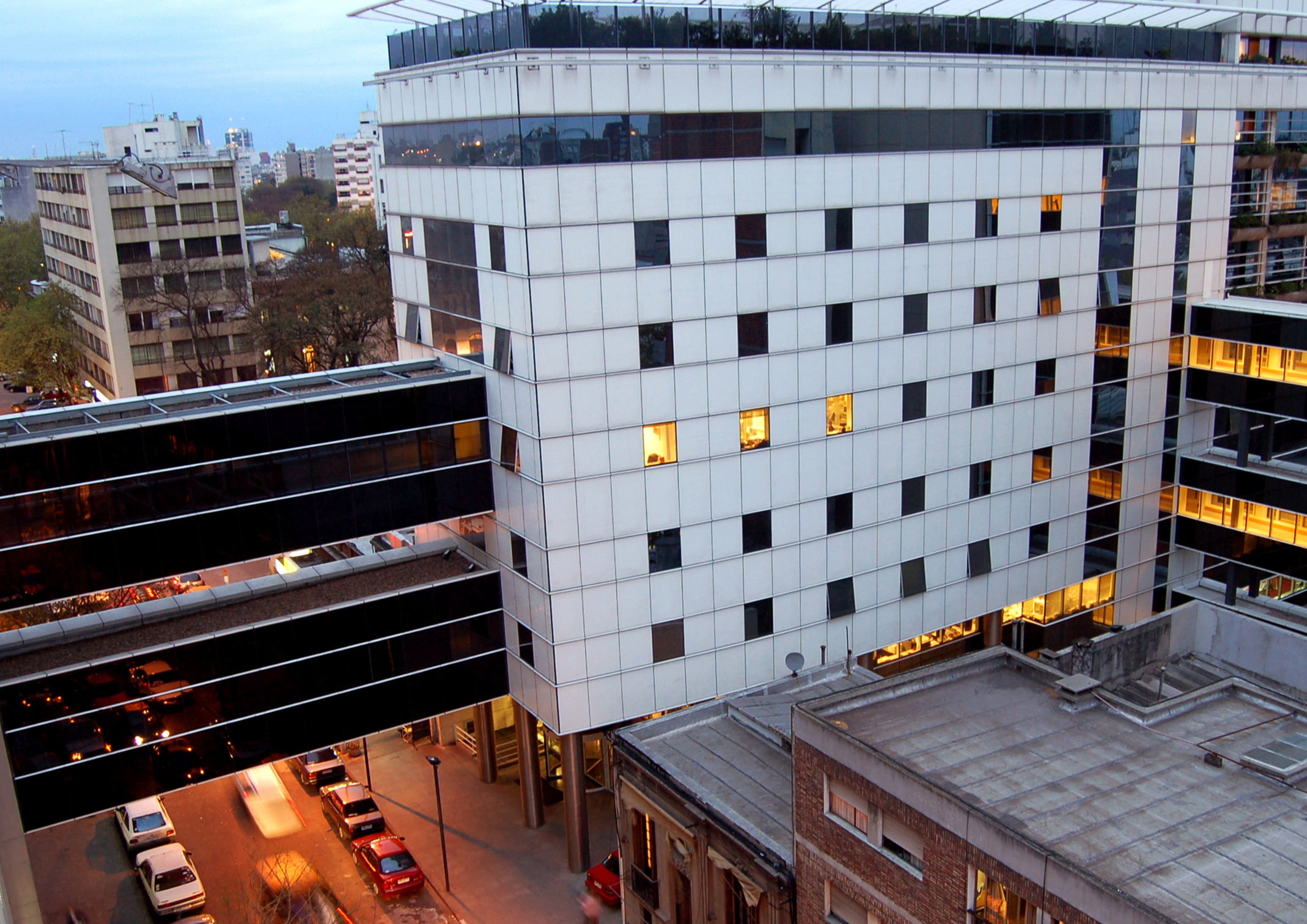
- Asociación Española's main facility in Montevideo

Geography
- Location: 1515 Artigas Boulevard, Montevideo, Uruguay

Organisation
- Care system: Private

History
- Founded: September 25, 1853 (172 years ago)

Links
- Website: www.asesp.com.uy/home
- Lists: Hospitals in Uruguay

The Asociación Española de Socorros Mutuos (lit. 'Spanish Mutual Aid Association'), commonly known as Asociación Española is a private healthcare provider in Uruguay. Founded in 1853 by the Spanish Uruguayan community, it operates as an Institución de Asistencia Médica Colectiva, a type of non-profit health organisation that provides comprehensive medical services to its members.

The organisation operates two main hospital facilities in Montevideo, as well as a network of medical centres and primary care polyclinics across its metropolitan area and the Maldonado Department. As of January 2024, it has approximately 194,000 members, making it one of the largest institutions of its kind within the Uruguayan healthcare system.

== History ==
The Asociación Española de Socorros Mutuos was founded on 25 September 1853 by a group of Spanish immigrants, who sought to establish a healthcare institution inspired by European mutualist models. Its purpose was to provide assistance in cases of illness, unemployment, and disability to members of the Spanish community, which was experiencing significant growth due to increasing transatlantic immigration to Uruguay.

The institution was financed through monthly membership fees, which entitled members to medical and dental care, access to pharmaceutical products, and financial support in the event of unemployment. As a result, the Asociación Española became the first medical mutual organization in Uruguay and one of the earliest of its kind in Latin America.

In 1871, the institution began admitting Uruguayan-born members, primarily the children and grandchildren of Spanish immigrants. The first was José María Añón, aged 12, who would later become the founder of the transport company CUTCSA.
