= Cristina Lustemberg =

Uruguayan pediatrician and politician

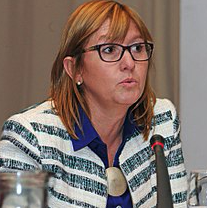

Minister of Public Health of Uruguay
- Incumbent
- Assumed office 1 March 2025
- President: Yamandú Orsi
- Preceded by: Karina Rando

Member of the Chamber of Representatives
- In office 30 October 2017 – 14 February 2025
- Preceded by: José Querejeta
- Constituency: Montevideo

Deputy Minister of Public Health
- In office 1 March 2015 – 27 October 2017
- Preceded by: Leonel Briozzo
- Succeeded by: Jorge Quian

Member of the Chamber of Representatives
- In office 15 February 2015 – 25 February 2015
- Succeeded by: José Querejeta
- Constituency: Montevideo

Personal details
- Born: María Cristina Lustemberg Haro; 12 January 1966 (age 59); Juan Lacaze, Uruguay
- Political party: Broad Front
- Children: 3
- Education: University of the Republic
- Occupation: Pediatrician, politician
- Website: www.parfrenteamplio.uy

María Cristina Lustemberg Haro (born 12 January 1966) is a Uruguayan pediatrician and politician of the Broad Front who has served as Minister of Public Health since 1 March 2025.

== Biography ==
Cristina Lustemberg was born in Juan Lacaze on 12 January 1966. From ages 8 to 20, she lived in exile in Cuba with her family. She earned a medical degree in 1995 and a pediatric certification in 2001. In public health, she worked in the Montevideo neighborhoods of La Paloma, Villa del Cerro, and Jardines del Hipódromo. Her husband is also a doctor, and they have three daughters.

From 2005 to 2011, she worked in the public sector as head of the Childhood and Adolescence Area of the State Health Services Administration (ASSE). From January 2012 to February 2015, she was coordinator of the Office of Planning and Budget's "Uruguay Grows With You" program (Spanish: Uruguay Crece Contigo). She worked on projects related to childhood and adolescence and public management.

She was elected to the Chamber of Representatives on Raúl Sendic Rodríguez's 711 list, of the Broad Front, for the term 2015–2020. However, President Tabaré Vázquez named her Deputy Minister of Public Health that same year. In 2017, she resigned from her post in the ministry and returned to her seat in the legislature, which had been held by José Querejeta in the interim. In February 2017, she left the Sendic sector.

At the end of 2017, the PAR group ("Participate. Articulate. Redouble") was formed, led by Lustemberg and made up of leading members from other sectors of the Broad Front, independents, and citizens without prior party affiliation. The group identifies itself with left-wing, egalitarian, diverse, anti-patriarchal, and feminist values. It supported the candidacy of Daniel Martínez in the 2019 presidential primaries.

In the 2019 general election, Lustemberg again won a seat as deputy for Montevideo for the term 2020–2025. In addition, she was mentioned as a potential Minister of Social Development in the event that Daniel Martínez had been elected president.

In December 2024, President-elect Yamandú Orsi announced that Lustemberg would serve as Minister of Public Health.
