= Fundación Pérez Scremini =

Uruguayan non-profit for pediatric oncology

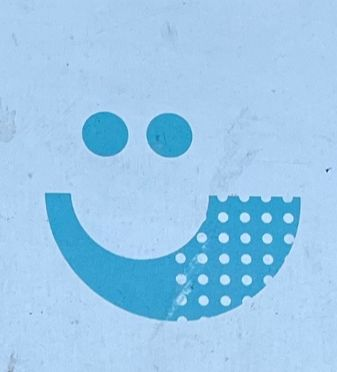
- Founded: 2020; 6 years ago
- Type: Non-profit organization
- Location: Montevideo, Uruguay
- Region served: Uruguay
- Website: perezscremini.org/

Fundación Pérez Scremini is a Uruguayan non-profit organization that works for the cure of pediatric cancer. Located in Montevideo, it operates the oncology unit at the Hospital Pereira Rossell; it is part of St. Jude Global Alliance. It is funded by private donations and ASSE.

The foundation is named after Bishop Martín Pérez Scremini. It is sponsored by several companies, organizations and individuals, such as football player Luis Suárez and his wife Sofía Balbi.
