= Susana Muñiz =

Uruguayan physician and politician

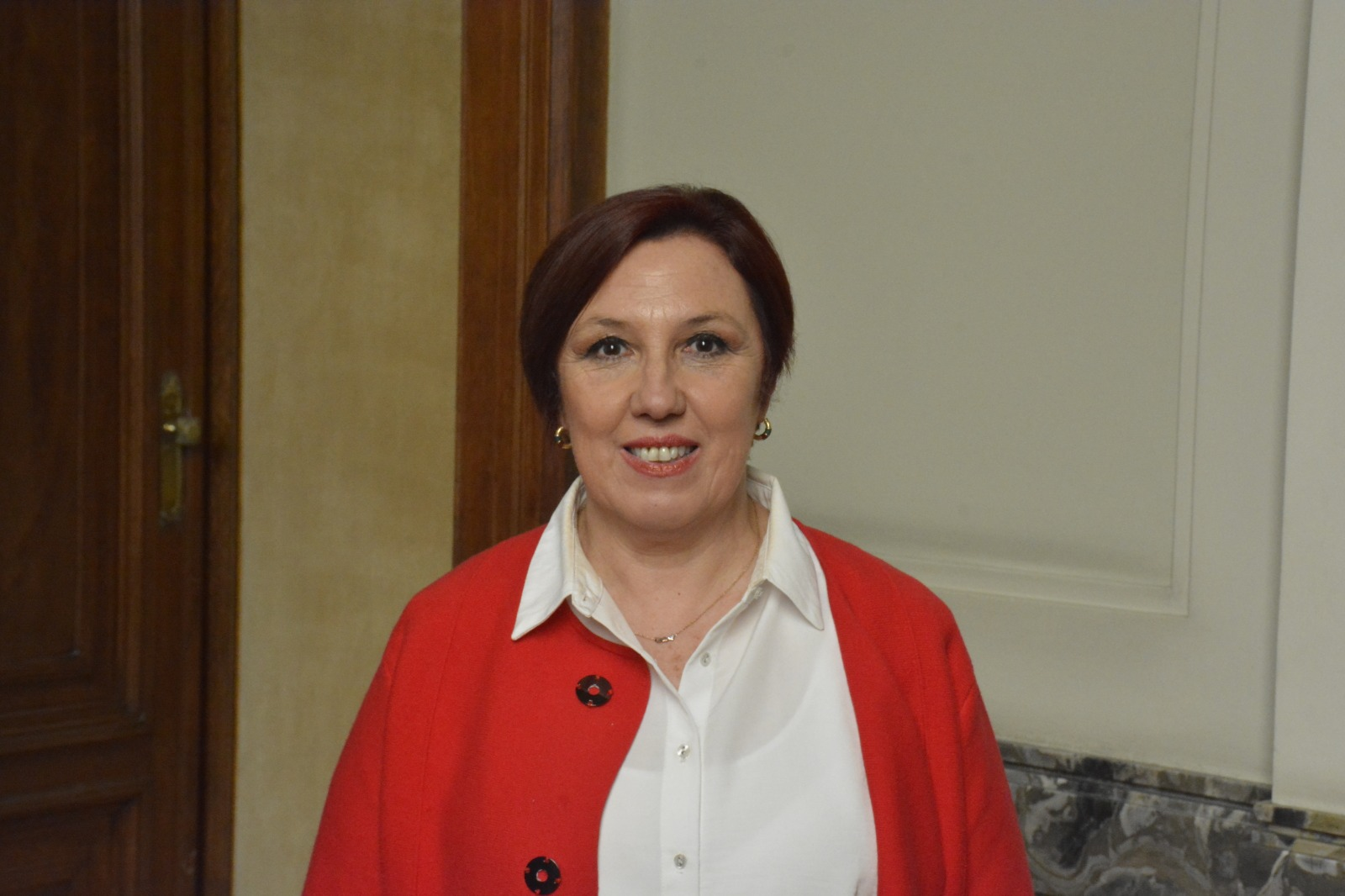
Susana Muniz

Susana Muñiz is a Uruguayan physician and politician.

A member of the Broad Front (Communist Party of Uruguay), she was the Minister of Public Health in the cabinet of President José Mujica.
