= Karina Rando =

Uruguayan anesthesiologist and politician

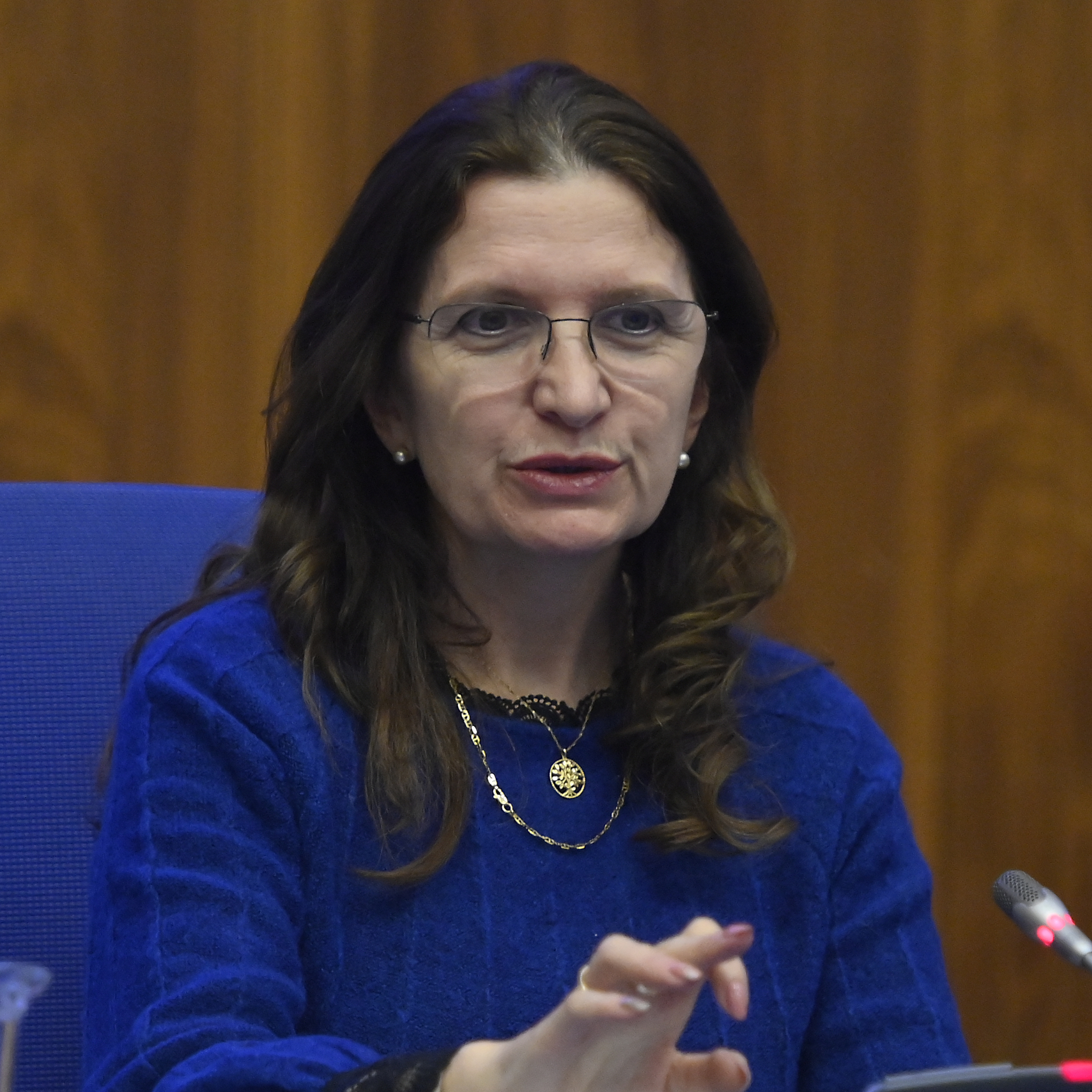
- Rando in 2023.

Minister of Public Health of Uruguay
- In office 13 March 2023 – 1 March 2025
- President: Luis Lacalle Pou
- Preceded by: Daniel Salinas
- Succeeded by: Cristina Lustemberg

Personal details
- Born: Ana Evelyn Karina Rando Huluk
- Party: Open Cabildo
- Education: University of the Republic
- Occupation: Anesthesiologist; politician

Ana Evelyn Karina Rando Huluk is a Uruguayan anesthesiologist and politician of Open Cabildo (CA), who served as Minister of Public Health of Uruguay from 13 March 2023 until 1 March 2025.

Rando attended the Crandon Institute and graduated with a medical degree from the University of the Republic. She has provided services in different health centers and since 2009 she has been a member of the founding team of the Bi-Institutional Liver Transplant Unit of the Central Hospital of the Armed Forces as anesthesia coordinator.

Her predecessor as minister Daniel Salinas had in part left the job and politics because of the attention he received from anti-vaccine groups during the pandemic. Rando's appointment raised questions about her political experience. She had previously been the Coordination Director at the Ministry of Public Health and her appointment was by President Lacalle Pou.
