= Hospital Pasteur =

Hospital in Montevideo, Uruguay

- State Health Services Administration
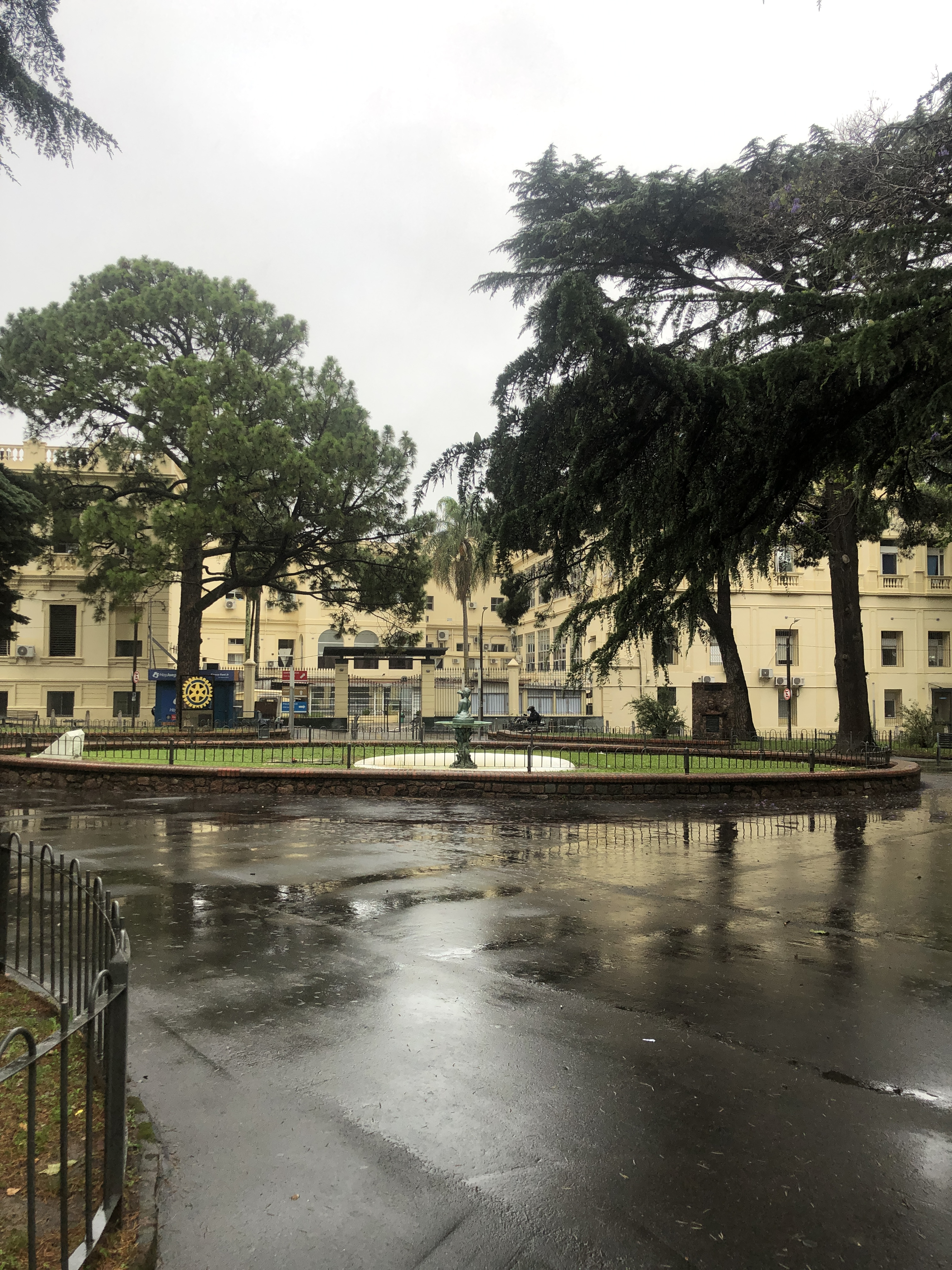

Geography
- Location: 2458 Larravide Street, Montevideo, Uruguay

Organisation
- Type: General

Services
- Emergency department: Yes
- Beds: 247

History
- Founded: 22 November 1922; 103 years ago

Links
- Website: hospitalpasteur.uy
- Lists: Hospitals in Uruguay

Hospital Pasteur is a public hospital located in the Unión neighbourhood of Montevideo, Uruguay. It is administered by the State Health Services Administration (ASSE) and was founded in 1912, being named after the French scientist Louis Pasteur.

== History ==
In 1847, during the Uruguayan Civil War, the Gobierno del Cerrito led by Manuel Oribe planned the establishment of a National College in the then Villa de la Restauración (present-day Unión neighbourhood), on land donated by businessman and landowner Tomás Basáñez. Completed in 1850, the building initially housed a school of jurisprudence and forensic practice. After the end of the war in 1851, it was repurposed as a prison. In 1860, during the presidency of Bernardo Berro, it was converted into a poorhouse. During the Revolution of the Lances (1870–1872), it temporarily served as a hospital for the revolutionary forces of Timoteo Aparicio before resuming its charitable functions in peacetime.

Asilo de Mendigos y Crónicos

Owing to the growing number of residents, the entire building was eventually occupied and a second storey was added between 1876 and 1878. Following the construction of the Piñeyro del Campo Asylum, the former poorhouse was abandoned and later converted into a hospital. In 1922, on the centenary of Louis Pasteur’s birth, the institution was named in his honour, and it was officially inaugurated as a hospital in 1923 by President José Serrato. After the Battle of the River Plate, the only naval engagement of World War II in South America, Hospital Pasteur was among the medical centres that treated wounded combatants.

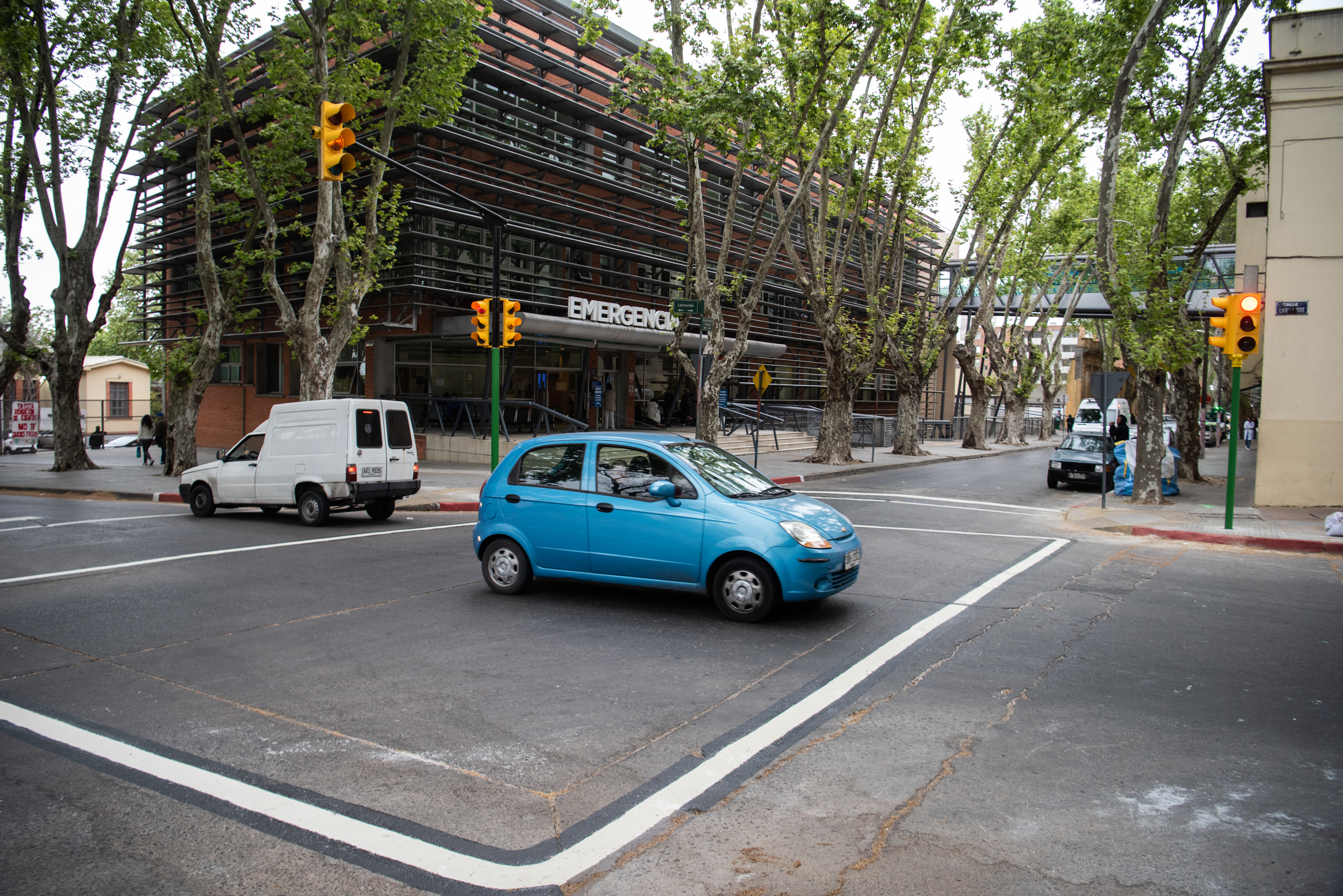
Annex and emergency department wing, 2022

In 2022, renovations were undertaken to add 75 rooms to the psychiatry department and to expand the emergency department. In October 2025, the construction of a new US$60 million building was announced by ASSE. The project is intended to accommodate moderate-care inpatient wards, an intensive care unit, and imaging services.

Hospital Pasteur is a national referral centre in several medical specialties, including emergency urology, plastic and microsurgery, and hepatology, and also operates as a university teaching hospital, hosting departments of the University of the Republic's Faculty of Medicine and providing clinical training and residency programmes.
