= Spanish Hospital (Uruguay) =

Hospital Español
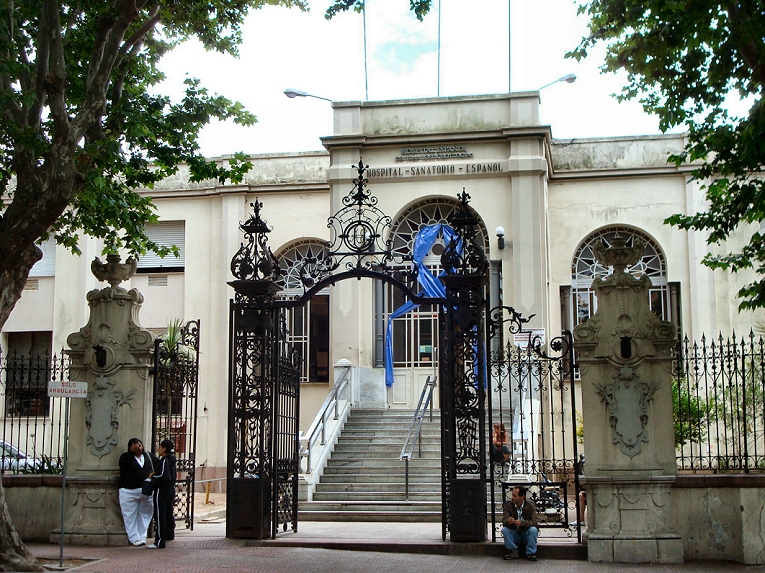

Geography
- Location: Garibaldi Avenue 1729, Montevideo, Uruguay

Organisation
- Care system: Public
- Type: General

History
- Founded: 1909

Links
- Website: Hospital Español

The Spanish Hospital or Hospital Español Juan José Crottogini is a hospital in Montevideo, Uruguay. It is located on Avenida Garibaldi 1729, between the neighborhoods of El Reducto and La Figurita.

== History ==
The institution arose on the initiative of the Spanish community with the name Hospital Asilo Español, which provided free assistance to those most in need. The sovereign assembly was held in 1886, and after several difficulties the Spanish Hospital was inaugurated in 1909.

The Spanish Hospital began to suffer serious financial problems in 2000, and the directors withdrew from the institution in 2003. A commission of officials, retirees and neighbors took control of the center, and managed to turn it into a free public hospital under the tutelage of the State Health Services Administration (ASSE), being reopened in 2007 with the name of the doctor and politician Juan José Crottogini.

In 2020, after the coronavirus outbreak in Uruguay, the Spanish Hospital was the first COVID-19 center in the country. The infected patients were transferred to conditioned facilities.
