= CUTCSA =

Uruguayan bus company

Compañía Uruguaya de Transportes Colectivos S.A.

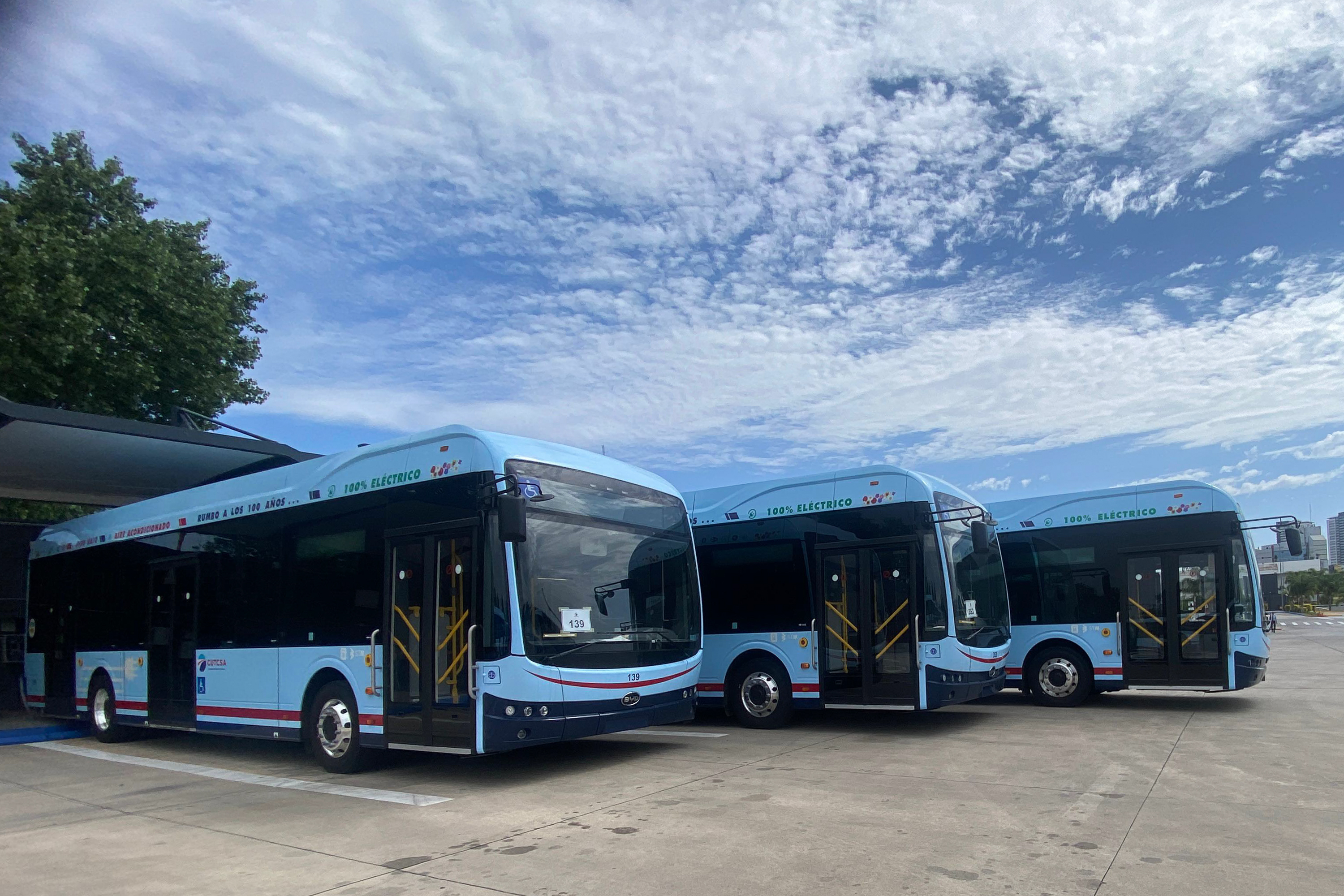
- Presentation of new electric buses, 2024
- Type: Sociedad Anónima
- Industry: Public transport
- Founded: 16 August 1937; 89 years ago
- Headquarters: Montevideo, Uruguay
- Area served: Montevideo and the Montevideo metropolitan area
- Key people: Juan Pablo Salgado Varela (president)
- Website: www.cutcsa.com.uy

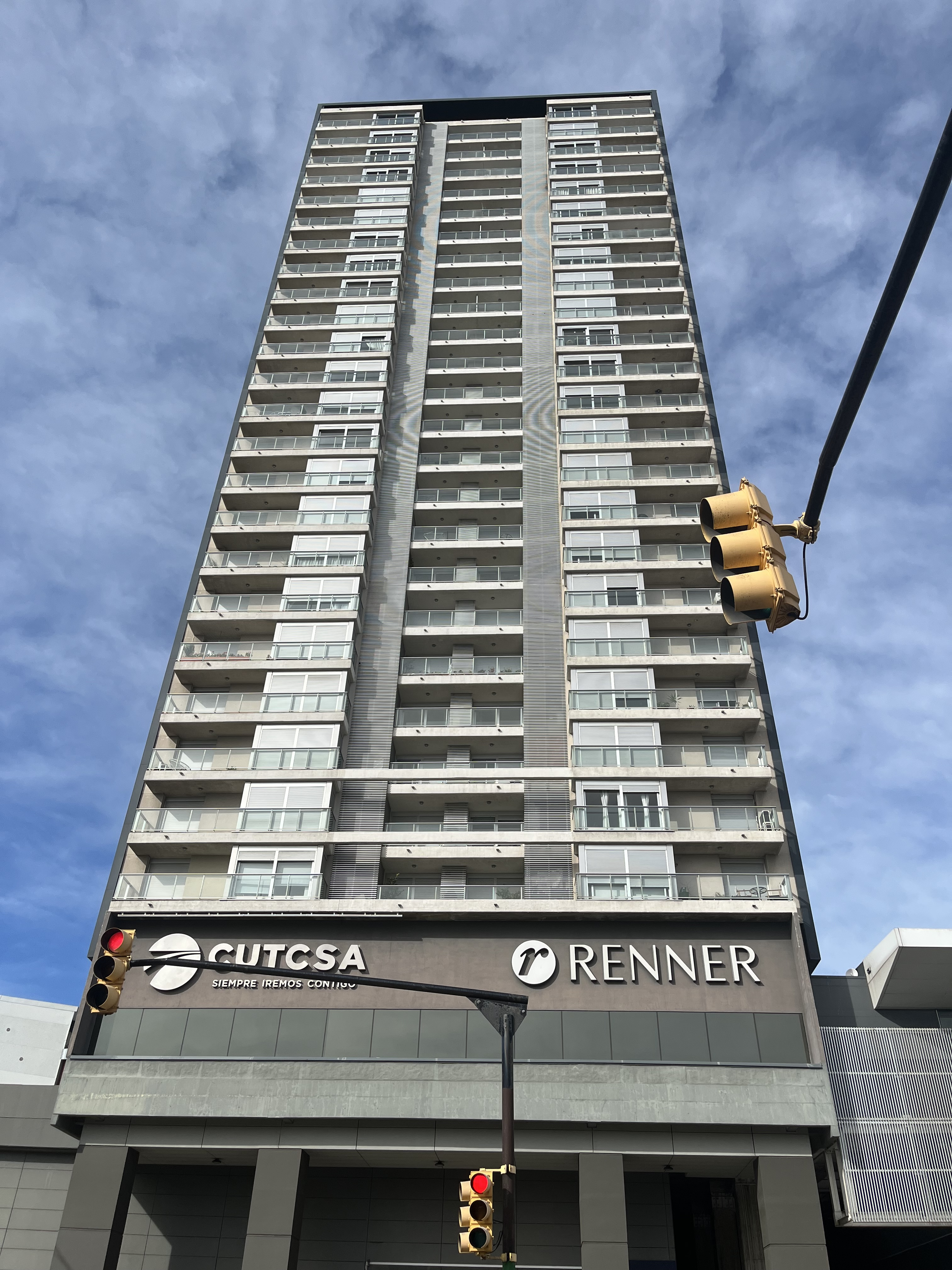
Torres Nuevocentro, photographed in 2025

Compañía Uruguaya de Transportes Colectivos S.A. (CUTCSA) is a Uruguayan bus company that operates urban, metropolitan and tourist services in Montevideo and the Montevideo metropolitan area. Founded in 1937, it describes itself as Uruguay's principal collective passenger-transport company. A Transportation Research Board report described CUTCSA as the largest single private urban bus operator in South America.

Its founding president was José Añón. Juan A. Salgado later served as president and, in 2018, became the first CUTCSA president to also head the Chamber of Transport of Uruguay. As of 2026, the company's board is headed by Juan Pablo Salgado Varela, with Juan Antonio Salgado Vila as vice-president.

== History ==
=== Origins ===
On 27 September 1926, the Centro de Propietarios de Ómnibus was established, bringing together bus owners and drivers in Montevideo to defend their interests and coordinate services. By 1928, transport cooperatives had been assigned letters of the alphabet together with fixed routes and destinations, helping regularise the city's bus network. By 1934, Montevideo already had a structured set of lines identified as A, B, B-A, B-B, D, E, F-A, G, H, I, K, L, M and Z. With the later consolidation of CUTCSA, these lines were reorganised as internal groupings or divisions of the company, reducing their number from fourteen to eight.

In 1936 the transport cooperatives were brought together in the Cooperativa Central de Autobuses de Montevideo. The definitive merger followed in 1937 with the creation of the Cooperativa Uruguaya de Transportes Colectivos Sociedad Anónima, whose first assembly was held on 13 May 1937. Service began on 16 August 1937 with a fleet of 526 buses. Two days later those vehicles were operating under the name "CUTCSA". The fleet, painted chalk white with a red stripe, was numbered from 1 to 526 according to the alphabetical order of the routes. The suburban lines N, O, P, R, S, T, TA, U and UA were initially integrated into the general fleet numbering system and received route numbers later.

In 1938, CUTCSA added line LA (Aduana–Palacio Legislativo), running via Bulevar Artigas, Junta Administradora (now Gregorio Gallinal) and General Flores. This was the last line to use a letter designation, because in October of that year the municipal government ordered route designations to be changed from letters to numbers. The system was reorganised as follows:

Former lettered routes and their numerical designations (1938)
Former designation	Number	Notes
A	101	
A-A	102	
A-B	103	
A-C	104	
A-F	105	
A-I	106	
A-J	107	
A-K	108	
R-A	109	
U	110	
B	116	
B-A	117	
B-B	118	
B-C	121	
B-D	122	
D	125	
D-C	126	
D-D	127	
D-E	128	
D-F	129	
F-S	130	
N	131	
S	132	
T	133	
T-A	134	via Las Flores
T-A	135	via O'Higgins
E	141	
E-A	142	
E-X	143	
F	146	
F-A	147	
F-B	148	
F-C	149	
P	150	
G	154	
G-A	155	
G-B	156	
G-C	157	
H	161	
H-A	162	
H-B	163	
H-C	164	
I	168	
I-A	169	
I-B	170	
I-C	171	
I-D	172	
I-E	173	
I-M	174	
O	175	
U-A	176	
K	181	
K-A	182	
K-C	183	
L	187	
L-A	188	
Z	191	

On 13 November 1946, the company adopted the legal name Compañía Uruguaya de Transportes Colectivos Sociedad Anónima, which remains its formal name.

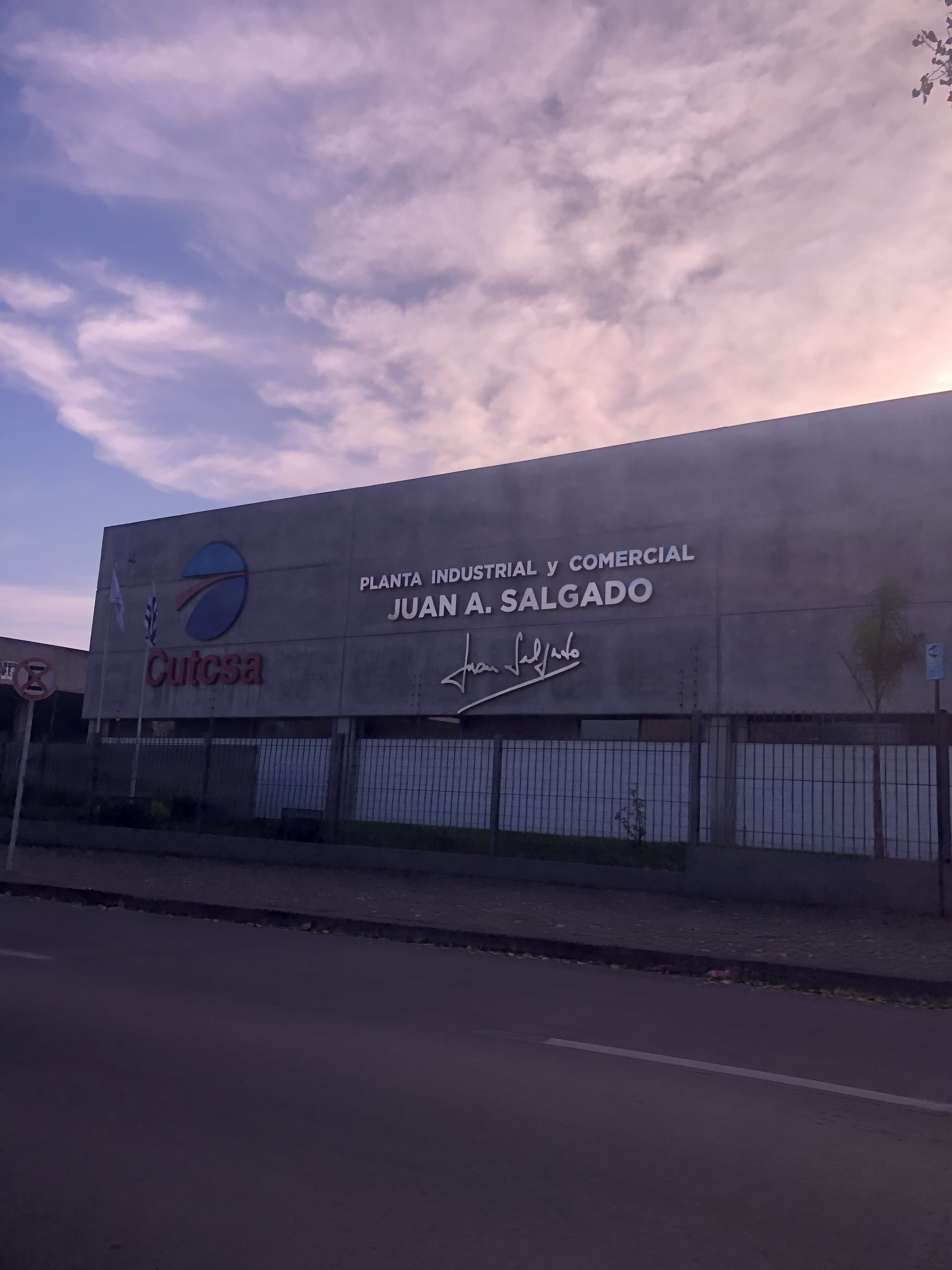
The Juan A. Salgado industrial and commercial plant

=== Expansion and modern developments ===
CUTCSA's network expanded in later decades. According to the company's official history, in 1978 it began the suburban "Inter" services (214–215) and the C1, C2, C3 and C4 lines to Salinas and Parque del Plata. In 1992 it became a 15% shareholder in Terminal Baltasar Brum and incorporated the former Cooptrol lines 4, 60, 62 and 64. In 2016, following the dissolution of Raincoop, CUTCSA incorporated services and personnel from the former lines 14, 21, 77 and D10.

On 6 May 2005, CUTCSA presented the Transporte para Todos ("Transport for All") project, aimed at making bus services accessible to passengers with disabilities. The project led to the creation of lines A and B, specially adapted for wheelchair users and other passengers with reduced mobility. Company reports state that these vehicles were the first accessible buses in Uruguay and received the first UNIT accessibility certificate awarded to transport vehicles under guideline UNIT 200:2004.

The company also introduced biodiesel testing in the mid-2000s, later using articulated buses on high-demand metropolitan services.

In 2016, CUTCSA incorporated Uruguay's first electric bus, a BYD K9, for pilot testing and monitoring. After the tests, twenty BYD K9 II units were added in 2020. Their arrival led to the rebranding of lines CA1, 14 and D1 as CE1, E14 and DE1, all-electric services later joined by the CE2 circuit.

In 2022, CUTCSA publicly committed itself to replacing its fleet exclusively with electric buses as permitted by government incorporation plans, targeting 25% electrification by 2025, 50% by 2030, 75% by 2035 and 100% by 2040.

In 2023, the company added its first electric Higher bus for testing on several routes. Company reporting noted accessibility improvements and the introduction of camera systems designed to complement or replace conventional mirrors; after successful tests, the vehicle adopted a light-blue livery that later became the standard identity of CUTCSA's electric fleet.

In 2024, CUTCSA announced the incorporation of 94 urban electric Higher buses and 6 double-decker units for the Montevideo Tourist Bus, with the company saying it expected to surpass 200 electric buses by early 2025. In September 2024, BYD also announced the delivery of 100 additional 12-metre electric buses to CUTCSA.

== Infrastructure ==
CUTCSA operates five principal plants in Montevideo, the most important of which are Planta José Añón and Planta Juan A. Salgado. According to the company, the José Añón complex houses management offices and administrative departments, while the Juan A. Salgado plant contains the company's central workshops. The five main plants are:

- Planta Juan A. Salgado
- Planta José Añón
- Planta Veracierto
- Planta Gronardo
- Planta Islas Canarias

The current José Añón plant opened in 2010, replacing an older site later redeveloped as Nuevocentro Shopping.

== Operations ==
CUTCSA operates within Montevideo's Metropolitan Transportation System. In its 2024 GRI reporting, the company described its service network as comprising 62 urban routes, 4 urban differential routes, 25 local routes, 18 metropolitan routes and 1 metropolitan differential route. A 2022–23 company report stated that the fleet comprised 1,141 buses.

Since November 2024, CUTCSA has also operated the hop-on hop-off Montevideo Tourist Bus under a municipal concession, using six accessible double-decker electric buses.

Beyond its scheduled services, CUTCSA also runs social and cultural programmes, vehicle-hire services, a school-bus programme, and driver training through Academia 81 and a driving simulator.

== Subsidies ==
CUTCSA has long operated within a subsidised fare structure. Sources published by the company and the Uruguayan press describe subsidy schemes covering diesel fuel and reduced fares for students, retirees and pensioners, with support provided through the municipal government of Montevideo and the national Ministry of Economy and Finance.

== Gallery ==
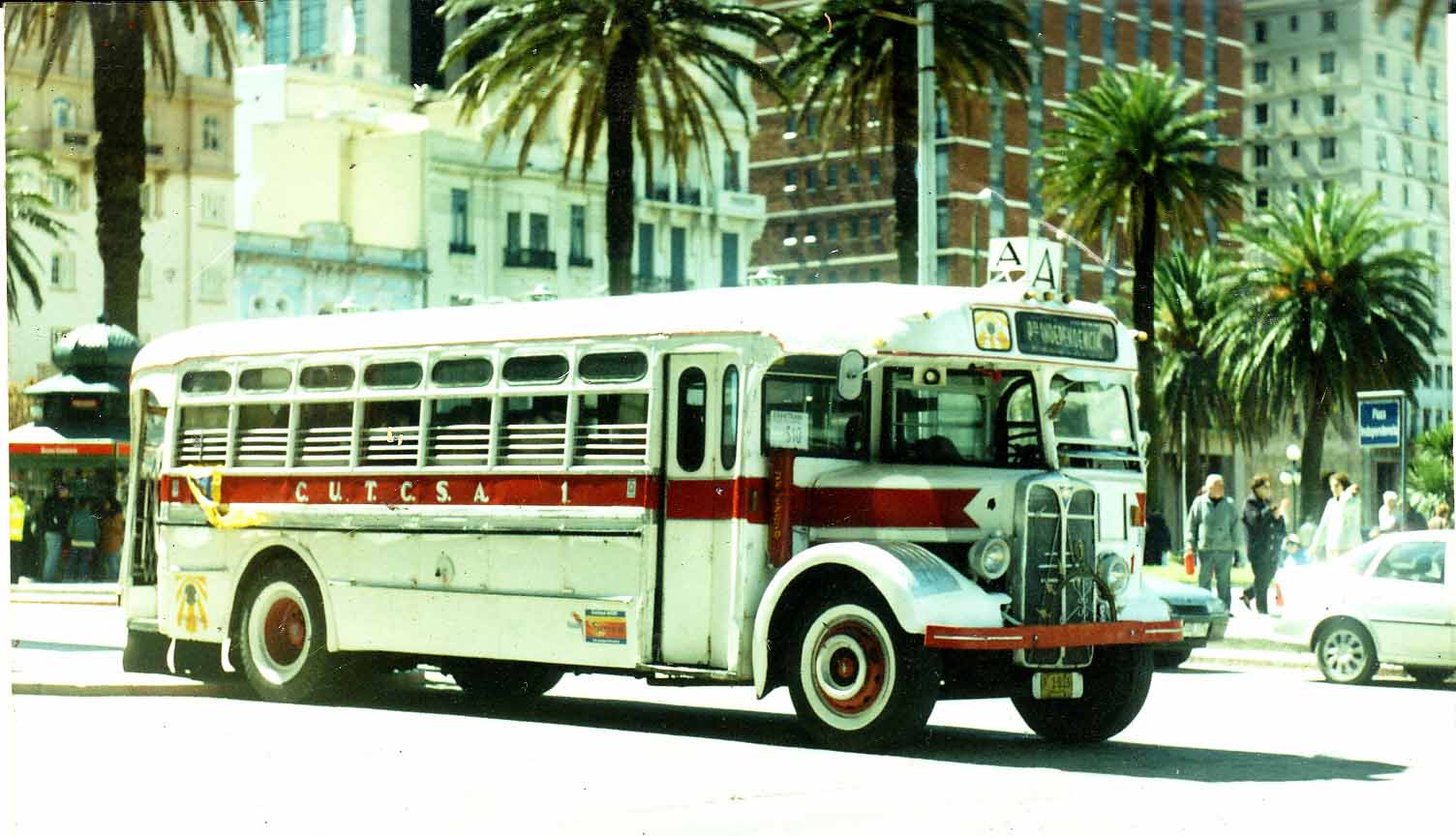

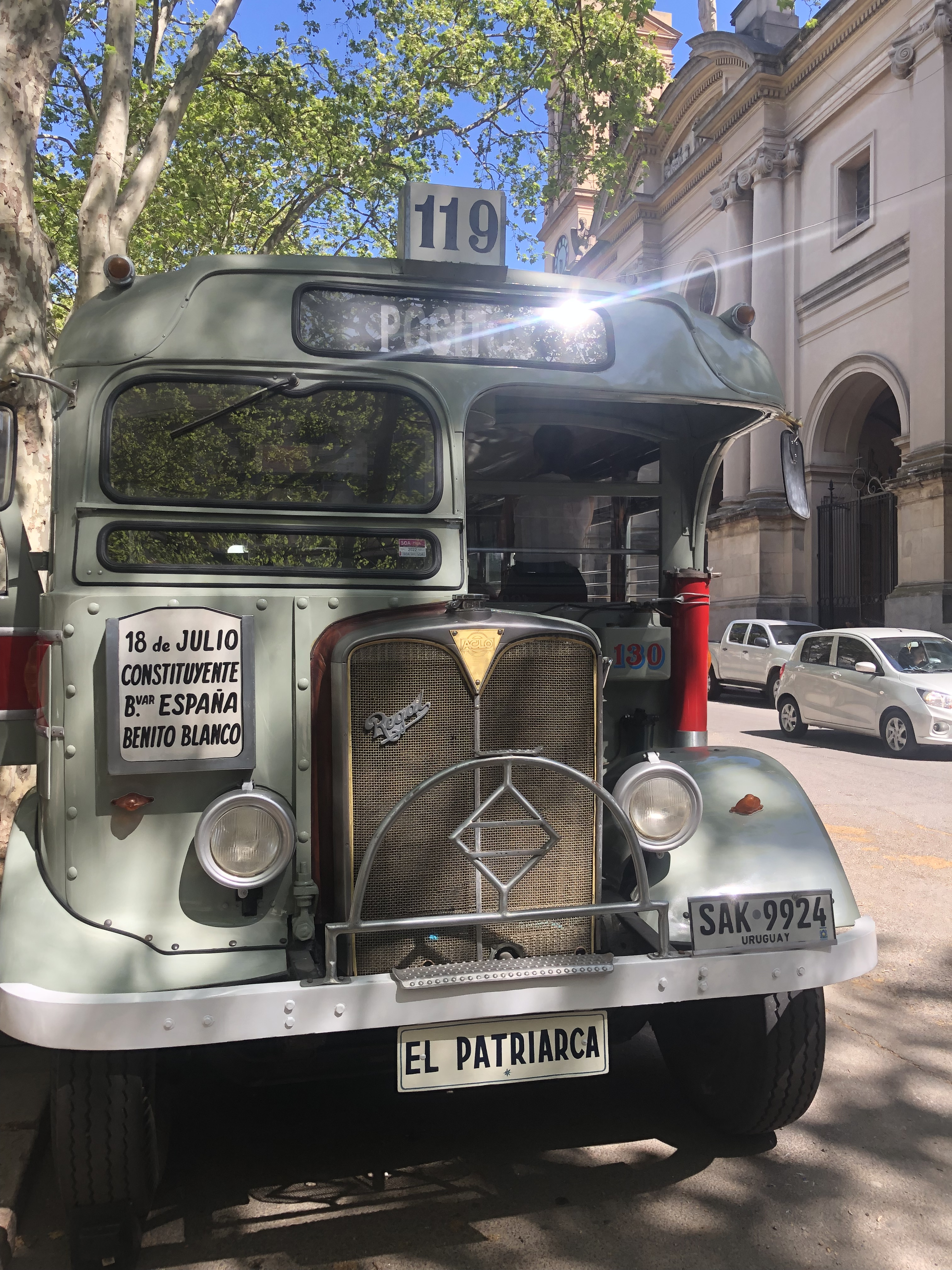

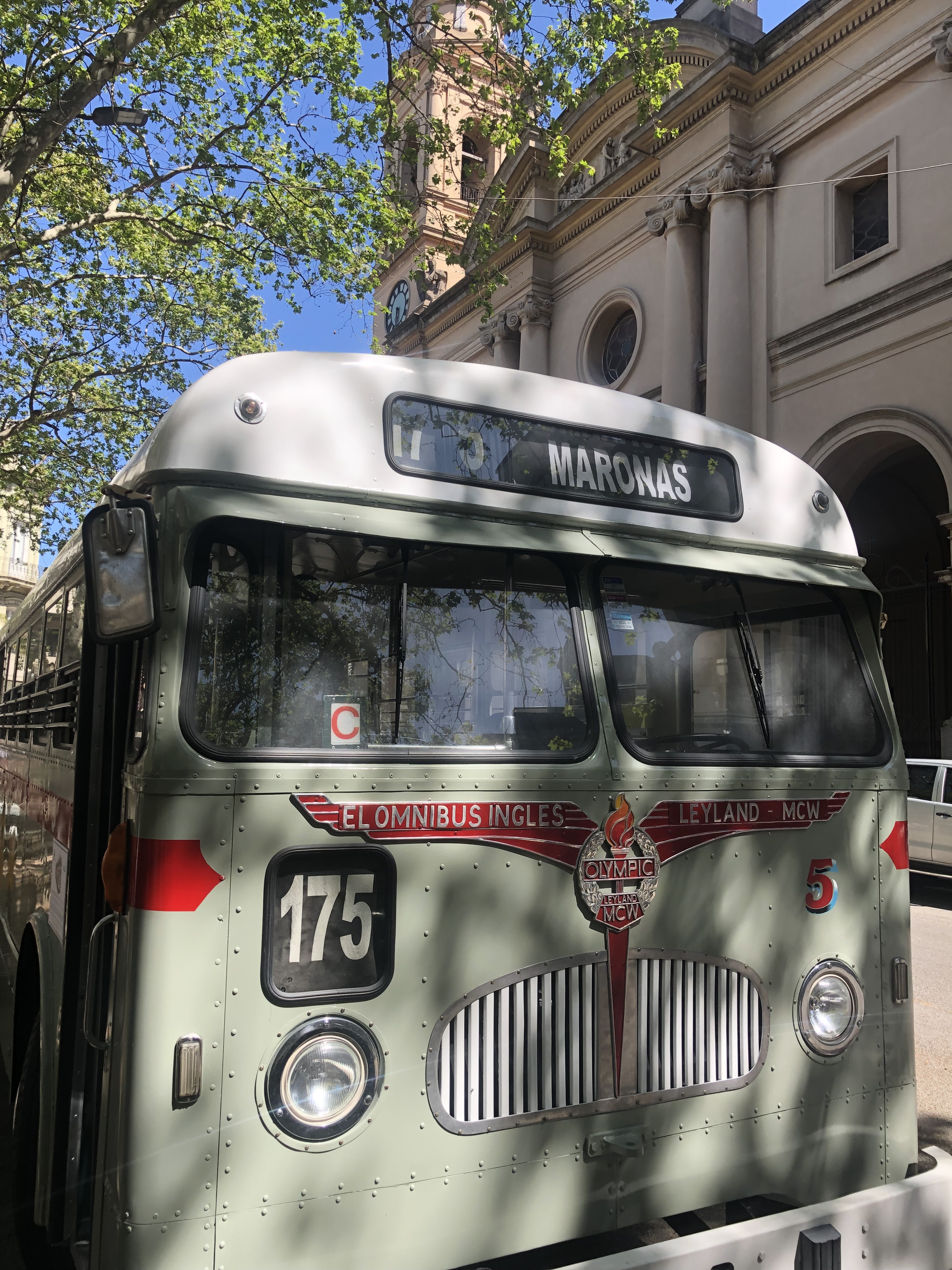

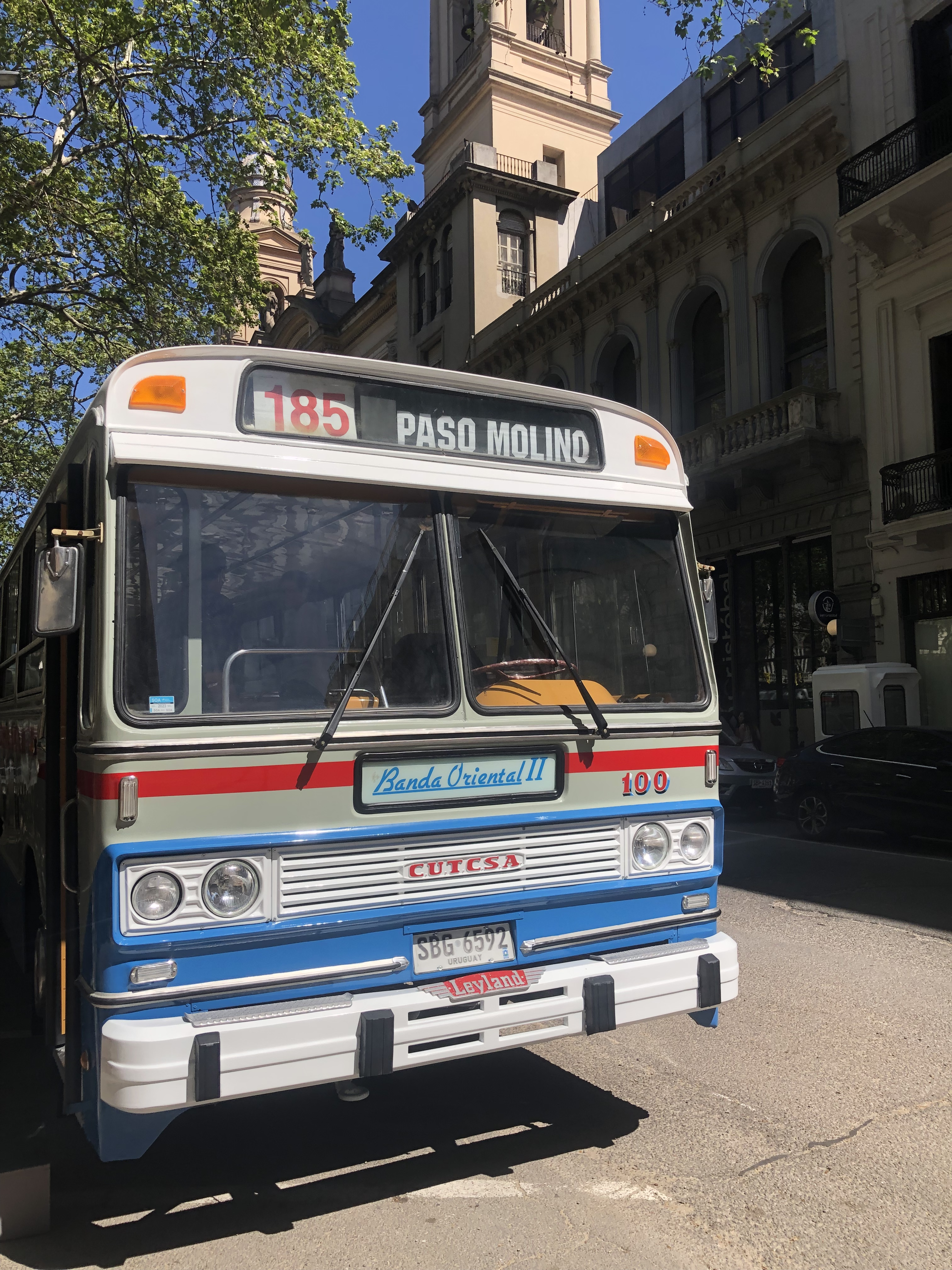

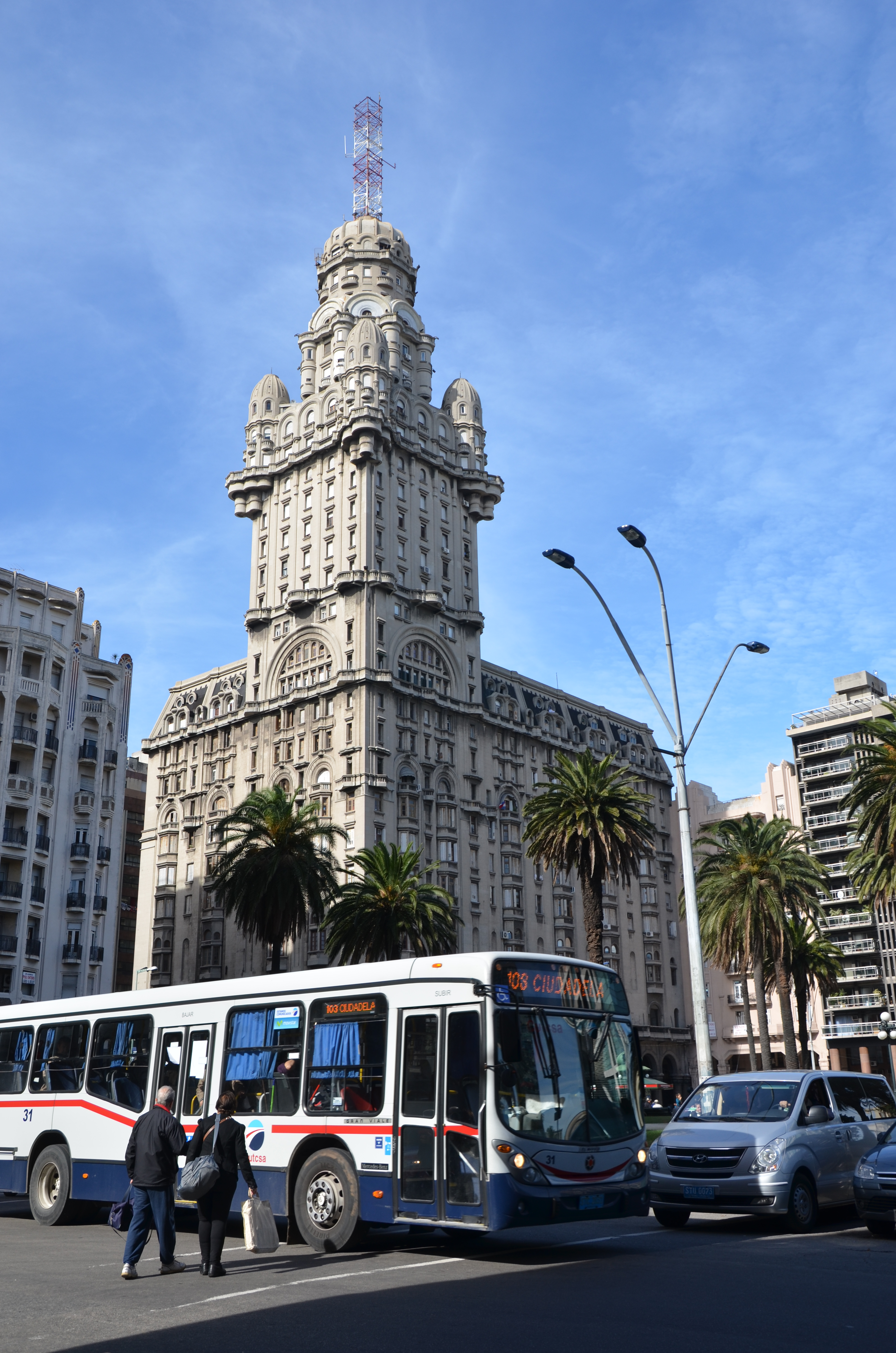

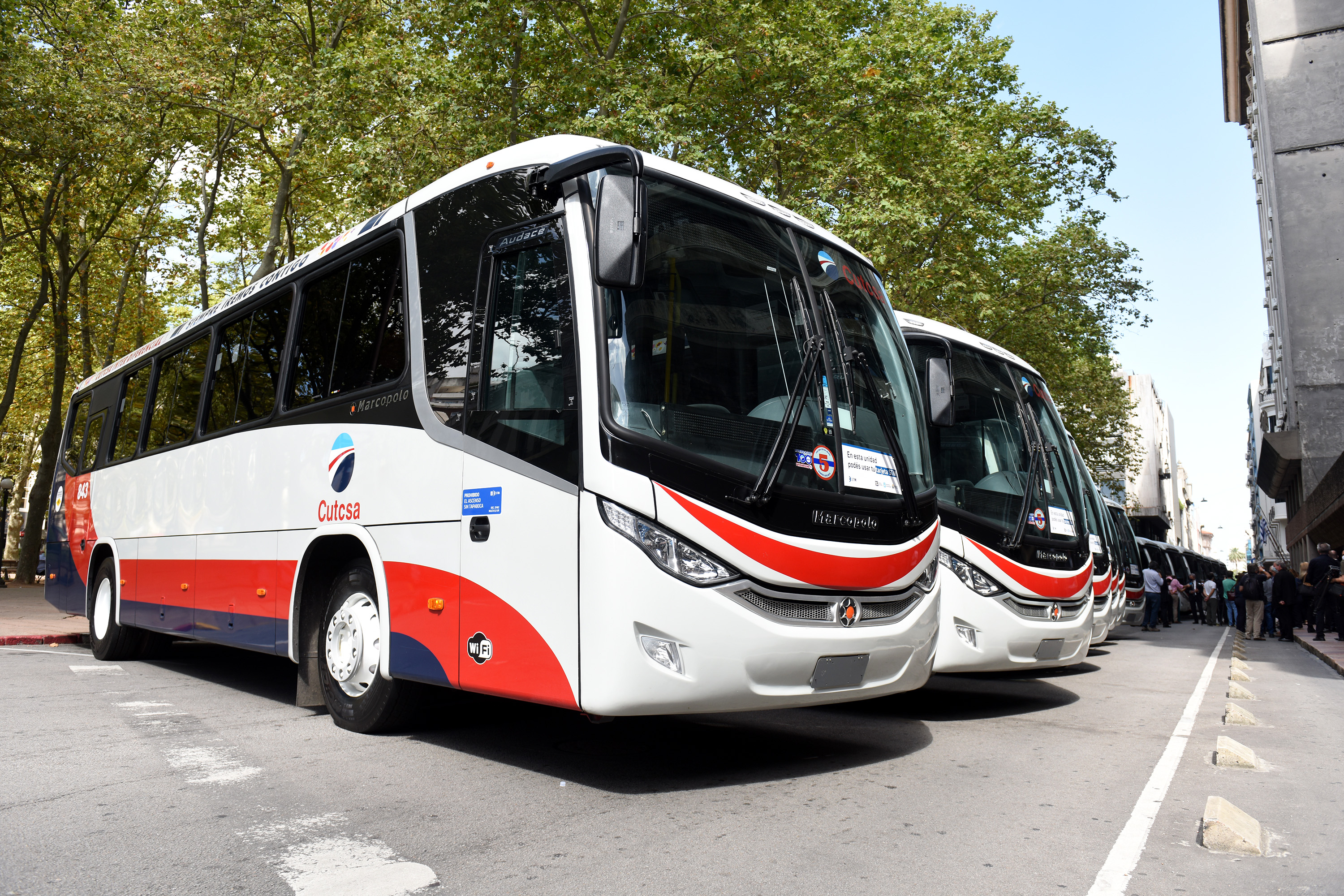

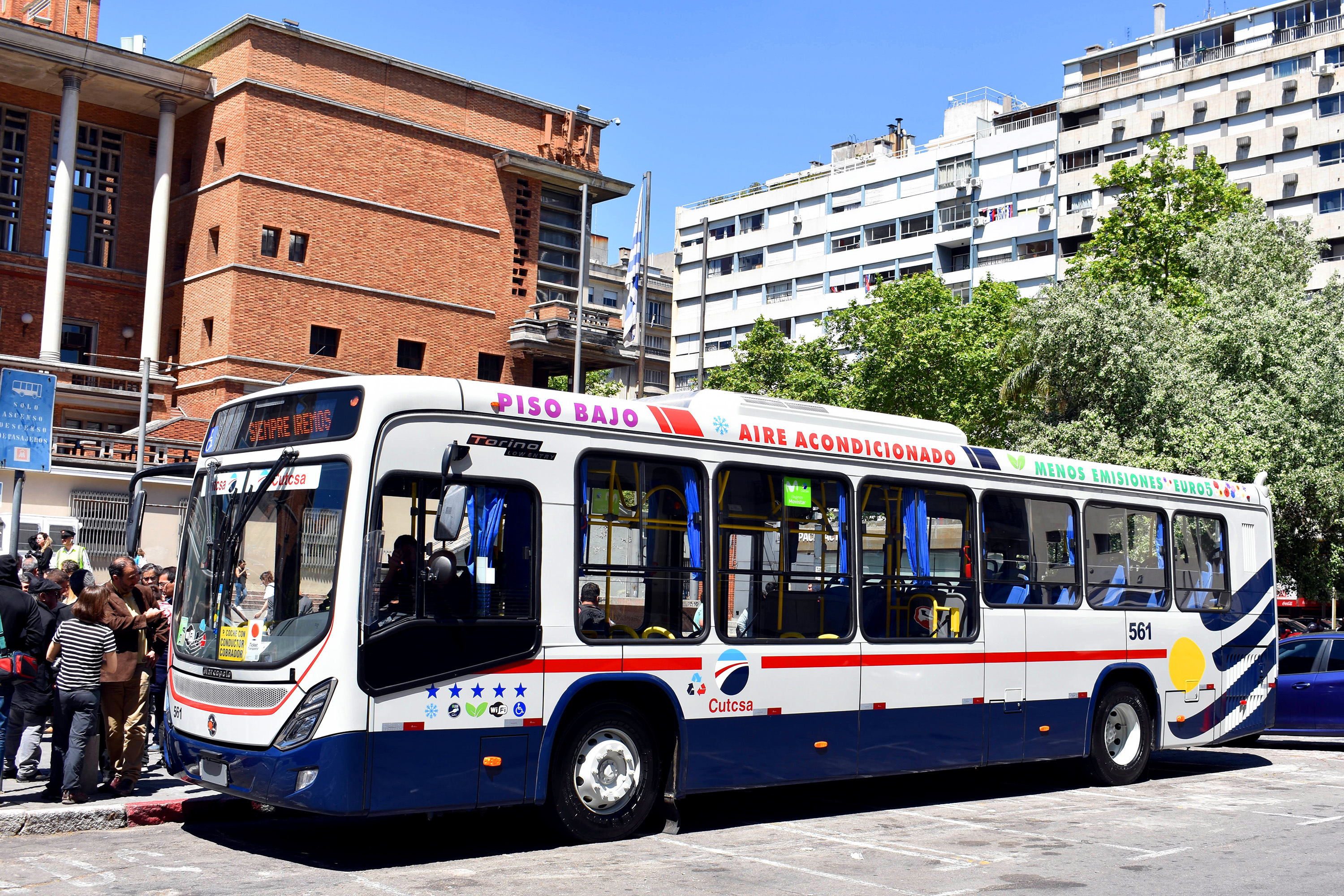

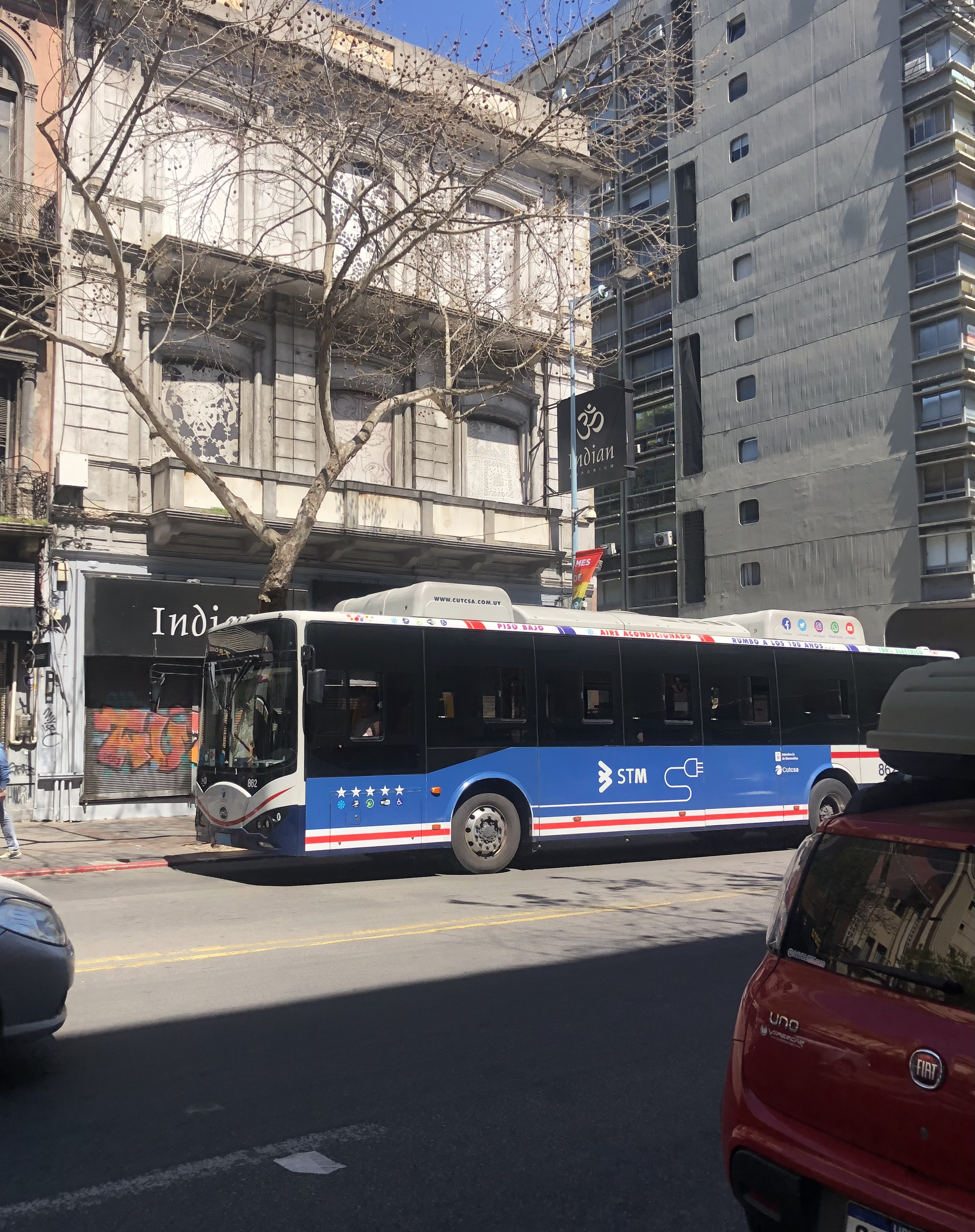

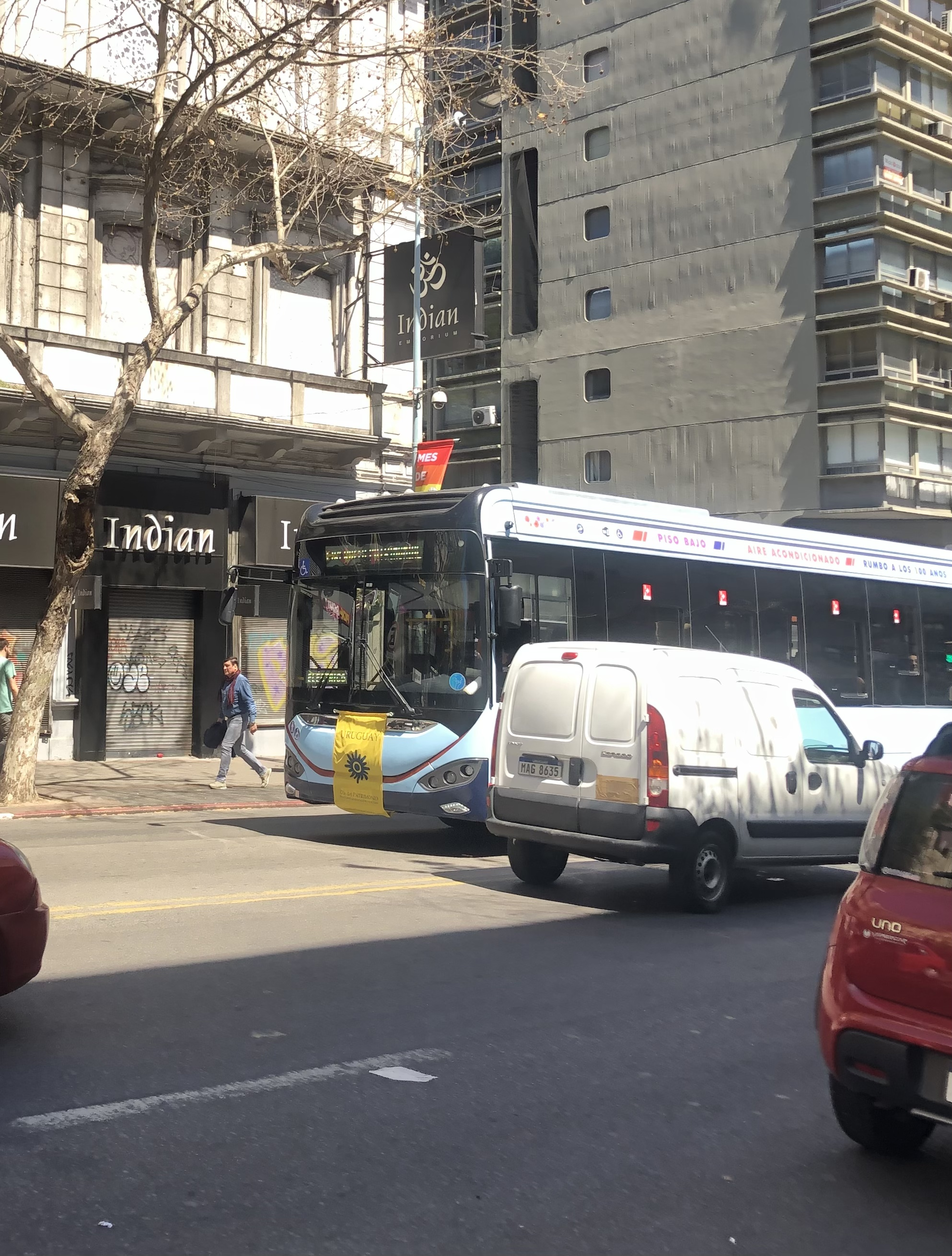
