= Ministry of Public Health (Uruguay) =

Uruguay governmental body responsible for public health

- Ministerio de Salud Pública

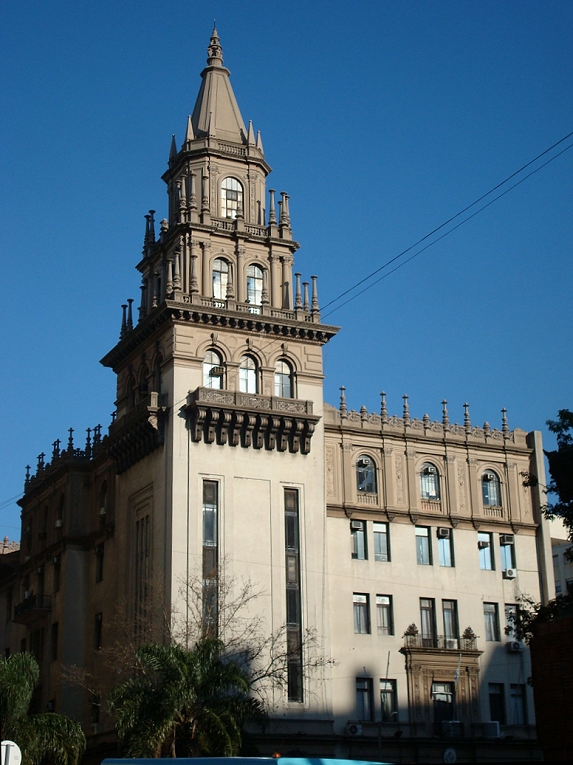

Ministry overview
- Formed: 5 September 1933
- Jurisdiction: Government of Uruguay
- Headquarters: Montevideo
- Minister responsible: Cristina Lustemberg
- Website: Public Health

The Ministry of Public Health (Spanish: Ministerio de Salud Pública, MSP) is the ministry of the Government of Uruguay responsible for establishing public health policies and strategies, in order to contribute to the improvement of the health of the inhabitants of the Nation.

The ministry's mission is to establish policies and strategies for the fulfillment of essential public health functions, as well as to guide the functioning of the National Integrated Health System (SNIS). The Ministry is headquartered at 18 de Julio Avenue in Barrio Cordón, Montevideo. This government portfolio is in charge of the National Institute for Donation and Transplantation of Cells, Tissues and Organs. The current Minister of Public Health is Cristina Lustemberg, who has held the position since March 1, 2025.

== History ==
The Ministry of Public Health was created on September 5, 1933, by president Gabriel Terra. Law 9,202 "Organic Law of Public Health" was enacted on January 12, 1934, and merged the two public institutions existing up to that time: "National Hygiene Council" and "National Public Assistance".

Since the approval of law 18161 of July 29, 2007, in which the State Health Services Administration (ASSE) was created, the ministry ceases to have direct competence over the country's health centers.

== List of ministers of public health ==
Minister	Began	Ended
Eduardo Blanco Acevedo	1933	1936
Juan César Mussio Fournier	1936	1943
Adolfo Folle Joanicó	1943	1945
Francisco Forteza	1946	1947
Enrique Claveaux	1947	1949
Lisandro Cersósimo	1950	1951
Carlos A. Viana Aranguren	1951	1952
Federico García Capurro	1952	1954
Julio César Estrella	1955	1956
Vicente Basagoiti	1956	1958
Washington Isola	1958	1959
Carlos Stajano	1959	1960
Aparicio Méndez	1961	1964
Francisco Rodríguez Camusso	1965	1967
Ricardo Yannicelli	1967	1968
Carlos Queraltó Oribe	1968	
Walter Ravenna	1968	1972
Pablo Purriel	1972	1973
Juan Bruno Iruleguy¹	1973	1974
Justo Alonso Leguízamo¹	1974	1976
Mario Arcos Pérez¹	1976	
Antonio Cañellas¹	1976	1981
Luis Givogre¹	1981	1985
Raúl Ugarte	1985	1990
Alfredo Solari	1990	1991
Carlos Delpiazzo	1991	1992
Guillermo García Costa	1992	1995
Alfredo Solari	1995	1997
Raúl Bustos	1997	2000
Horacio Fernández Ameglio	2000	2001
Luis Fraschini	2001	2002
Alfonso Varela	2002	2003
Conrado Bonilla	2003	2005
María Julia Muñoz	2005	2010
Daniel Olesker	2010	2011
Jorge Venegas	2011	2013
Susana Muñiz	2013	2015
Jorge Basso	2015	2020
Daniel Salinas	2020	2023
Karina Rando	2023	2025
Cristina Lustemberg	2025	in office
Source		

¹ Ministers of the Military-Civic government (1973-1985).

== See also ==
- Health in Uruguay
