= Jorge Basso =

Uruguayan physician and politician

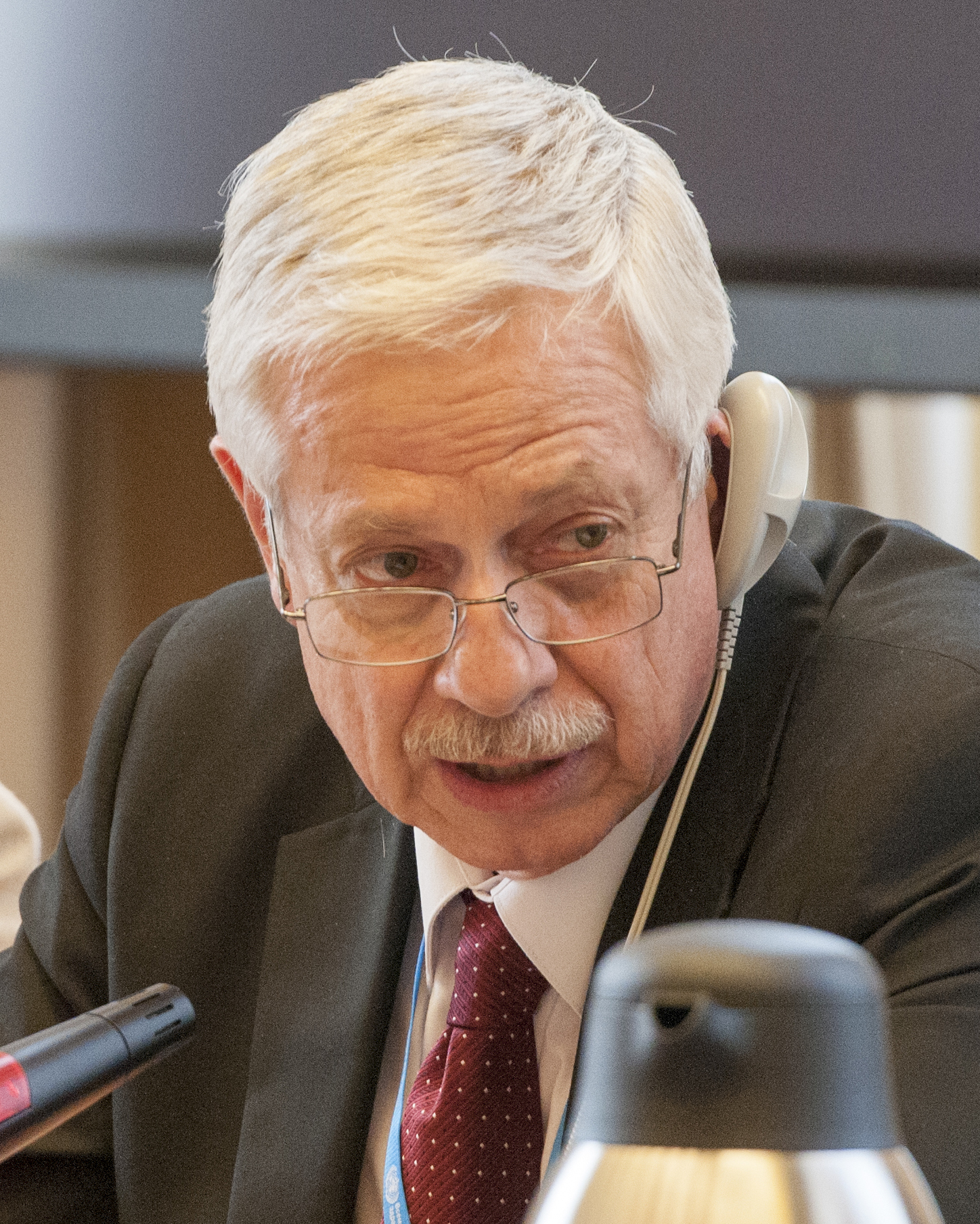
Jorge Basso in 2016

Jorge Basso (born 28 April 1956) is a Uruguayan physician and politician of the Socialist Party – Broad Front, who served as Minister of Public Health from 2015 to 2020, during the second administration of Tabaré Vázquez.
