= Hospital Pereira Rossell =

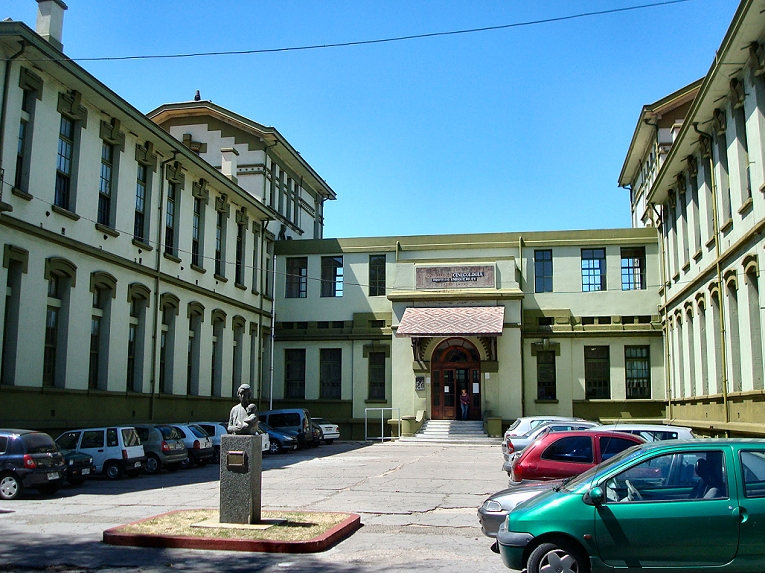

Geography
- Location: Bulevar General Artigas 1590, Parque Batlle, Montevideo, Uruguay
- Coordinates: 34°53′53″S 56°9′49″W

Organisation
- Care system: Public
- Type: Specialist

Services
- Beds: 700
- Speciality: Paediatric, gynaecological

History
- Founded: 22 February 1908

Hospital Pereira Rossell is a children's hospital in Montevideo, Uruguay. Located in the Parque Batlle neighbourhood and founded in 1908, it was named in honour of Alejo Rossell y Rius and Dolores Pereira, who were the principal promoters of its establishment.

It was the first paediatric hospital, and shortly afterwards the first maternity hospital when the obstetric and gynaecological clinic was installed in 1915. Later the hospital received a donation from Dr. Enrique Pouey for a radiotherapy unit.

The Fundación Pérez Scremini operates its pediatric oncology unit.
