= State Health Services Administration =

Public health care provider in Uruguay

- Administración de los Servicios de Salud del Estado
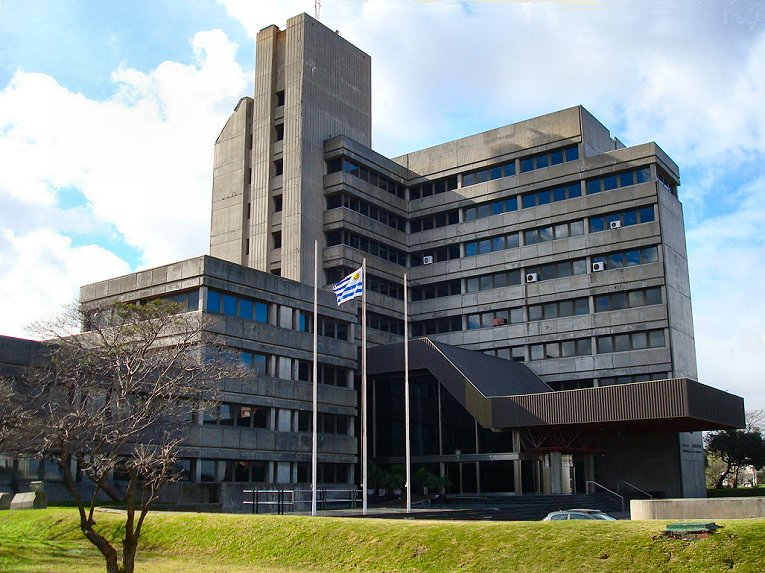
- Abbreviation: ASSE
- Formation: 1987
- Type: Government agency
- Headquarters: Liberty Building
- Region served: Uruguay
- Chairman: Leonardo Cipriani
- Vice-chairman: Marlene Sica
- Website: Administración de los Servicios de Salud del Estado

The State Health Services Administration (ASSE) (Spanish: Administración de los Servicios de Salud del Estado) is the state provider of health care in Uruguay. It has a network of services throughout the country.

It was created in 1987 and modified by law 18,161 of July 2007. This body is related to the Executive Power through the Ministry of Public Health. The administration is presided over and administered by a five-member board of directors, who are appointed by the President of the Republic in agreement with the Council of Ministers, with the prior consent of the Senate. Of the five members, one represents the workers of the organization and the other represents users.

== Functions ==
- Organize and manage services regarding health care at the level of prevention and treatment of patients.
- Coordinate with the other state health service delivery agencies to maximize their quality.
- Be part of the National Integrated Health System (SNIS).
- Provide the services that prior to its creation, provided the decentralized ASSE service.
- Contribute to changes in practices, attitudes and lifestyles that put the population's health at risk.

== Health centers ==
=== Montevideo Department ===
- Maciel Hospital
- Pasteur Hospital
- Saint Bois Hospital
- Spanish Hospital
- Pereira Rossell Hospital
- Hospital Filtro
- Paulina Luisi Women's Hospital
- National Blood Service

==== Centers of Mental Health and Vulnerable Population ====
- Vilardebó Hospital
- Psychiatric centers Dr. Bernardo Etchepare» and Santín Carlos Rossi.
- Luis Piñeyro del Campo Geriatric Center
- Jose Marti Eye Hospital

==== Institutes ====
- National Cancer Institute
- National Institute of Orthopedics and Traumatology
- National Institute of Rheumatology

=== Canelones Department ===
- Francisco Soca Hospital (Canelones)
- Alfonso Espínola Hospital (Las Piedras)
- Auxiliary Center (Pando)

=== Hospitals of the 2nd level of care ===
- Artigas Departmental Hospital (Artigas)
- Bella Union Hospital (Bella Unión)
- Rivera Departmental Hospital (Rivera)
- Dr. Ruben Curi Hospital (Paso de los Toros)
- Ángel Maximiliano Cuervo Hospital (Fray Bentos)
- Auxiliary Center of Young (Young)
- Zoilo Chelle Hospital (Mercedes)
- Alejandro Bardie Hospital Dolores)
- Dr. Rogelio Sosa Hospital (Cardona)
- Cerro Largo Departmental Hospital (Melo)
- Auxiliary center of Río Branco (Río Branco)
- Dr. Emilio Penza Hospital (Durazno)
- José Percovich Hospital (Treinta y Tres)
- Dr. Edison Camacho Hospital (Trinidad)
- José Artigas Hospital (Carmelo)
- Auxiliary Center of Rosario (Rosario)
- Auxiliary Center of Juan Lacaze (Juan Lacaze)
- San José Departmental Hospital (San José de Mayo)
- San Carlos Hospital (San Carlos)
- Rocha Departmental Hospital (Rocha)
- Auxiliary Center of Chuy (Chuy)
- Auxiliary Center of Castillos (Castillos)

=== Regional Hospitals ===
- Alberto Barragué Hospital (Tacuarembó)
- Salto Departmental Dospital (Salto)
- Departmental Hospital «Escuela del Litoral Galán y Rocha» (Paysandú)
- Dr. Elbio Rivero Moreno Hospital (Maldonado)
- Dr. Alfredo Vidal y Fuentes Hospital (Minas)
- Raúl Amorín Cal Hospital (Florida)
- Colonia Departmental Hospital (Colonia del Sacramento)
