= 49th Legislature of the Chamber of Senators of Uruguay =

49th Legislature of the Chamber of Senators
| ← | 48th | 50th | → |

Overview
- Legislative body: General Assembly
- Jurisdiction: Uruguay
- Meeting place: Montevideo
- Term: 15 February 2020 – 15 February 2025
- Election: 27 October 2019
- Website: parlamento.gub.uy

Senate
- Members: 30 senators
- President: Beatriz Argimón (PN)
- Party control: Coalición Multicolor (PN, PC, PI, CA, PG)

Sessions
- 1st: 15 February 2020 – 15 December 2020
- 2nd: 1 March 2021 – 15 December 2021
- 3rd: 1 March 2022 – 15 December 2022
- 4th: 1 March 2023 – 15 December 2023
- 5th: 1 March 2024 – 15 September 2024

Composition of the Chamber

The Forty-Ninth Legislature of the Chamber of Senators of Uruguay is the session of the upper house of the Uruguayan General Assembly from February 15, 2020 to February 15, 2025, during the Presidency of Luis Alberto Lacalle Pou. It meets in Montevideo. Senators were elected in the 2019 general election in a single constituency.

== Major events ==
- 15 February 2020: The Chamber of Senators was chaired by José Mujica as the new vice president had not yet taken office.
- 1 March 2020: Vice President Beatriz Argimón, who serves as President of the Senate, took office.
- 1 April 2020: A bill presented by President Lacalle Pou to soften the economic effects of the COVID-19 pandemic was unanimously approved; Law No. 19,874 created the "Coronavirus Fund".
- 23 April 2020: A package of measures is presented by the Government through a "law of urgent consideration" to be legislated.
- 20 October 2020: Two former Presidents, Julio María Sanguinetti (1980–1985, 1995–2000) and José Mujica (2010–2015) retired from the Senate due to their advanced age.
- 15 December 2020: The General Assembly met to close the first session of the Legislature.
- 16 December 2020: Vice President Beatriz Argimón summoned Parliament for a special session to legislate the measures announced by President Lacalle Pou due to the exponential growth of cases of COVID-19.
- 19 December 2020: The Senate, in an all-night session, approved a law that regulates Article 38 of the Constitution, limiting the right of assembly for 60 days. Closure of the country's border was also legislated, framed in Article 37.
- 15 September 2024: The fifth and final session of the Legislature has come to a close. In an election year, the session ends before the elections, which are held in October.

== Party summary ==
| Party | Senate | | | |
| Party | Votes | % | Seats | +/– |
|---|---|---|---|---|
| Broad Front | 949,376 | 40.49 | 13 | –2 |
| National Party | 696,452 | 29.70 | 10 | 0 |
| Colorado Party | 300,177 | 12.80 | 4 | 0 |
| Open Cabildo | 268,736 | 11.46 | 3 | New |
| Partido Ecologista Radical Intransigente | 33,461 | 1.43 | 0 | 0 |
| Party of the People | 26,313 | 1.12 | 0 | 0 |
| Independent Party | 23,580 | 1.01 | 0 | –1 |
| Popular Unity | 19,728 | 0.84 | 0 | 0 |
| Green Animalist Party | 19,392 | 0.83 | 0 | New |
| Digital Party | 6,363 | 0.27 | 0 | New |
| Workers' Party | 1,387 | 0.06 | 0 | 0 |
| Invalid/blank votes | 88,399 | – | – | – |
| Total | 2,433,364 | 100 | 30 | 0 |
| Registered voters/turnout | 2,699,978 | 90.13 | – | – |
Source: Corte Electoral; El País

== Members ==
| Seat number | Senator | Party | Term | | |
| Seat number | Senator | Party | From | To | Notes |
|---|---|---|---|---|---|
| President of the Senate | José Mujica | Broad Front | 15 February 2020 | 1 March 2020 | President from the beginning of the legislature until the inauguration of the Vice President. |
| President of the Senate | Beatriz Argimón | National Party | 1 March 2020 | 1 March 2025 | She took office as Vice President of the Republic. |
| 1st. | José Mujica | Broad Front | 1 March 2020 | 20 October 2020 | He resigned due to suffering from an autoimmune disease and the COVID-19 pandemic. |
| 1st. | Alejandro Sánchez | Broad Front | 20 October 2020 | 15 February 2025 | |
| 2nd | Lucía Topolansky | Broad Front | 15 February 2020 | 1 March 2022 | Resigned the seat to retire |
| 2nd | Sebastián Sabini | Broad Front | 2 March 2022 | | Assumes seat after Topolansky's retirement |
| 3rd | Eduardo Bonomi | Broad Front | 15 February 2020 | 20 February 2022 | Died while in office |
| 3rd | Daniel Caggiani | Broad Front | 2 March 2022 | | |
| 4th | Sandra Lazo | Broad Front | 15 February 2020 | 15 February 2025 | |
| 5th | Charles Carrera | Broad Front | 15 February 2020 | 25 September 2024 | He resigns in response to a request from the Public Prosecutor's Office to remove his immunity due to an ongoing investigation against him |
| 6th | Mario Bergara | Broad Front | 15 February 2020 | 15 February 2025 | |
| 7th | Liliam Kechichián | Broad Front | 15 February 2020 | 15 February 2025 | |
| 8th | Enrique Rubio | Broad Front | 15 February 2020 | 5 December 2023 | |
| 9th | Amanda Della Ventura | Broad Front | 15 February 2020 | 15 February 2025 | |
| 10th | Óscar Andrade | Broad Front | 15 February 2020 | 15 February 2025 | |
| 11th | Carolina Cosse | Broad Front | 15 February 2020 | 20 November 2020 | She resigned her seat to take office as Intendant of Montevideo |
| 11th | Silvia Nane | Broad Front | 20 November 2020 | 15 February 2025 | |
| 12th | Daniel Olesker | Broad Front | 15 February 2020 | 6 December 2022 | He resigned to serve as chairman of the Social Affairs Committee of the Broad Front |
| 12th | José Nunes | Broad Front | 5 December 2022 | 15 February 2025 | |
| 13th | José Carlos Mahía | Broad Front | 15 February 2020 | 1 March 2020 | He assumes as first substitute while Danilo Astori serves as Minister of Economy. |
| 13th | Danilo Astori | Broad Front | 1 March 2020 | 15 November 2020 | |
| 13th | José Carlos Mahía | Broad Front | 15 November 2020 | 15 February 2025 | Resigned the seat to retire |
| 14th | Carmen Asiaín | National Party | 15 February 2020 | 15 February 2025 | The holder was Luis Lacalle Pou but he took office as President of the Republic. The first substitute; Falero resigned when he was appointed Deputy Director of the Office of Planning and Budget. |
| 15th | Álvaro Delgado | National Party | 15 February 2020 | 1 March 2020 | He resigned when he was appointed Secretary of the Presidency of Uruguay. Amin Niffouri took over. |
| 15th | Amin Niffouri | National Party | 1 March 2020 | 15 February 2025 | |
| 16th | Graciela Bianchi | National Party | 15 February 2020 | 15 February 2025 | |
| 17th | Luis Alberto Heber | National Party | 15 February 2020 | 1 March 2020 | He resigned when he was appointed Minister of Transport and Public Works. |
| 17th | Gustavo Penadés | National Party | 1 March 2020 | 11 October 2023 | He was stripped of his parliamentary immunity by the Senate due to a criminal investigation against him. |
| 18th | Sergio Botana | National Party | 15 February 2020 | 15 February 2025 | |
| 19th | Gloria Rodríguez Santo | National Party | 15 February 2020 | 15 February 2025 | |
| 20th | Javier García | National Party | 15 February 2020 | 1 March 2020 | He resigned when he was appointed Minister of National Defense. |
| 20th | Sergio Abreu | National Party | 1 March 2020 | 15 February 2025 | |
| 21st | Jorge Larrañaga | National Party | 15 February 2020 | 1 March 2020 | He resigned when he was appointed Minister of the Interior. |
| 21st | Carlos Camy | National Party | 1 March 2020 | 15 February 2025 | |
| 22nd | Jorge Gandini | National Party | 15 February 2020 | 15 February 2025 | |
| 23rd | Juan Sartori | National Party | 15 February 2020 | 15 February 2025 | |
| 24th | Ernesto Talvi | Colorado Party | 15 February 2020 | 1 March 2020 | He resigned when he was appointed Minister of the Foreign Relations. |
| 24th | Carmen Sanguinetti | Colorado Party | 1 March 2020 | 15 February 2025 | |
| 25th | Adrián Peña | Colorado Party | 15 February 2020 | 26 August 2020 | He resigned when he was appointed Minister of Environment. |
| 25th | Pablo Lanz | Colorado Party | 27 August 2020 | 15 February 2025 | |
| 26th | Julio María Sanguinetti | Colorado Party | 15 February 2020 | 20 October 2020 | He resigned his seat. |
| 26th | Tabaré Viera | Colorado Party | 20 October 2020 | 23 August 2021 | He resigned when he was appointed Minister of Tourism |
| 26th | Raúl Batlle Lamuraglia | Colorado Party | 23 August 2021 | 15 February 2025 | |
| 27th | Germán Coutinho | Colorado Party | 15 February 2020 | 15 February 2025 | |
| 28th | Guido Manini Ríos | Open Cabildo | 15 February 2020 | 15 February 2025 | |
| 29th | Guillermo Domenech | Open Cabildo | 15 February 2020 | 15 February 2025 | |
| 30th | Irene Moreira | Open Cabildo | 15 February 2020 | 1 March 2020 | She resigned when he was appointed Minister of Housing, Territorial Planning and Environment of Uruguay . |
| 30th | Raúl Lozano | Open Cabildo | 1 March 2020 | 5 May 2023 | He was appointed Minister of Housing and Territorial Planning after the resignation of Irene Moreira |
| 30th | Irene Moreira | Open Cabildo | 8 May 2023 | 15 February 2025 | After her resignation from the Ministry of Housing and Territorial Planning, she returned to her seat |
Source: Members of the Senate
