= Politics of Uruguay =

- Type: Unitary presidential constitutional republic
- Constitution: Constitution of Uruguay

Legislative branch
- Name: General Assembly
- Type: Bicameral
- Seat: Legislative Palace of Uruguay
- Upper house
- Name: Senate
- Vice President of Uruguay & President of the Senate: Carolina Cosse
- Lower house
- Name: Chamber of Representatives
- Presiding officer: Rodrigo Goñi Reyes

Executive branch
- President: Yamandú Orsi

Judicial branch
- System: Judiciary of Uruguay
- Supreme Court
- Chief judge: Doris Morales Martínez

The politics of Uruguay abide by a presidential representative democratic republic, under which the president of Uruguay is both the head of state and the head of government, as well as a multiform party system. The president exercises executive power, while legislative power is vested in the two chambers of the General Assembly of Uruguay. The Judiciary is independent from the executive and legislature.

Historically, Uruguay was one of Latin America's most stable democracies. However, from 1973 to 1985, it was ruled by a repressive military dictatorship, before becoming a democracy again in 1985.

The Colorado and National parties have been locked in a power struggle, with the predominance of the Colorado party throughout most of Uruguay's history. The 2004 election, however, brought the Encuentro Progresista-Frente Amplio-Nueva Mayoría, a coalition of socialists, former Tupamaros, communists, social democrats, and Christian Democrats among others to power with majorities in both houses of parliament. A majority vote elected President Tabaré Vázquez.

In 2009, the Broad Front once again won the elections with a plurality of the votes. A presidential runoff was triggered because their candidate, José Mujica, received only 47.96 percent of the vote. The Broad Front's candidate beat former president Luis Alberto Lacalle Herrera of the Nacional Party in the second round of voting. In addition to the presidency, the Broad Front won a simple majority in the Uruguayan Senate and Chamber of Representatives. In 2014, former president Tabaré Vázquez retook power after defeating, in a second round, the candidate of the National Party, Luis Lacalle Pou, who would be the winner of the 2019 election, surpassing the socialist Daniel Martínez with 50.79 to 49.2 percent of the vote. The 2024 election was won by Yamandú Orsi, a former Intendant of Canelones Department. He was inaugurated on 1 March 2025, meaning the left-wing coalition, the Broad Front, returned to power after a five-year interruption.

According to the V-Dem Democracy indices Uruguay is 2023 the 4th most electoral democratic country in Latin America.

== History ==
Until 1919, and from 1934 to 1952, Uruguay's political system, based on the 1830 Constitution, was presidential with strong executive power, similar to that of the United States (but centralized rather than federal). It was also characterized by the rivalry between the two traditional parties, the liberal Colorado Party and the conservative Blanco Party (or National Party). Historically, the Blancos represented the interests of rural property, the Church and the military hierarchy, while the Colorados were supported by urban movable property and reformist intellectuals.

In the 19th century, Uruguay had similar characteristics to other Latin American countries, including caudillism, civil wars and permanent instability (40 revolts between 1830 and 1903), control of important economic sectors in the hands of foreign capital, a high rate of illiteracy (more than half the population in 1900), and a landed oligarchy. Yet Montevideo became a refuge for Argentine exiles fleeing the dictatorship of Juan Manuel de Rosas and maintained a reputation as a welcoming place for "advanced" ideas of political and social protest. In 1842, the newspaper Le Messager français devoted a special issue to the memory of Charles Fourier. During the Great Siege of Montevideo (1843-1851), Garibaldi's redshirts fought against Rosas' attacking forces. In 1875, workers founded a section of the International.

At the beginning of the 20th century, Uruguay became the most politically and socially advanced state on the continent. The liberal José Batlle y Ordóñez (in power between 1903 and 1907, then between 1911 and 1915) was the main architect of this transformation; freedom of expression and the press was affirmed, as was that of suffrage. A system of proportional representation was adopted to allow for the representation of minorities. This period also saw the abolition of the death penalty, a fight against administrative corruption, and the introduction of secularism and women's suffrage.

On the economic level, Batlle stated that "industry must not be allowed to destroy human beings...on the contrary the State must regulate it in order to make the lives of the masses happier." An economic policy of dirigisme was thus undertaken, nationalizing many sectors of the economy (railways, telephone, electricity, among others). "Batllism" also took the form of social measures, including the introduction of free and compulsory primary education, maternity leave and the eight-hour day, as well as support for trade unions and the recognition of the right to strike. All this legislation, which was very advanced for its time, made Uruguay a progressive social democracy.

== Constitution ==
Uruguay adopted its first constitution in 1830, following the conclusion of a three-year war in which Argentina and Uruguay fought as a regional federation: the United Provinces of the Río de la Plata. Sponsored by the United Kingdom, the 1828 Treaty of Montevideo built the foundations for a Uruguayan state and constitution. A constitution proposed under the military dictatorship government was rejected by a referendum in 1980.

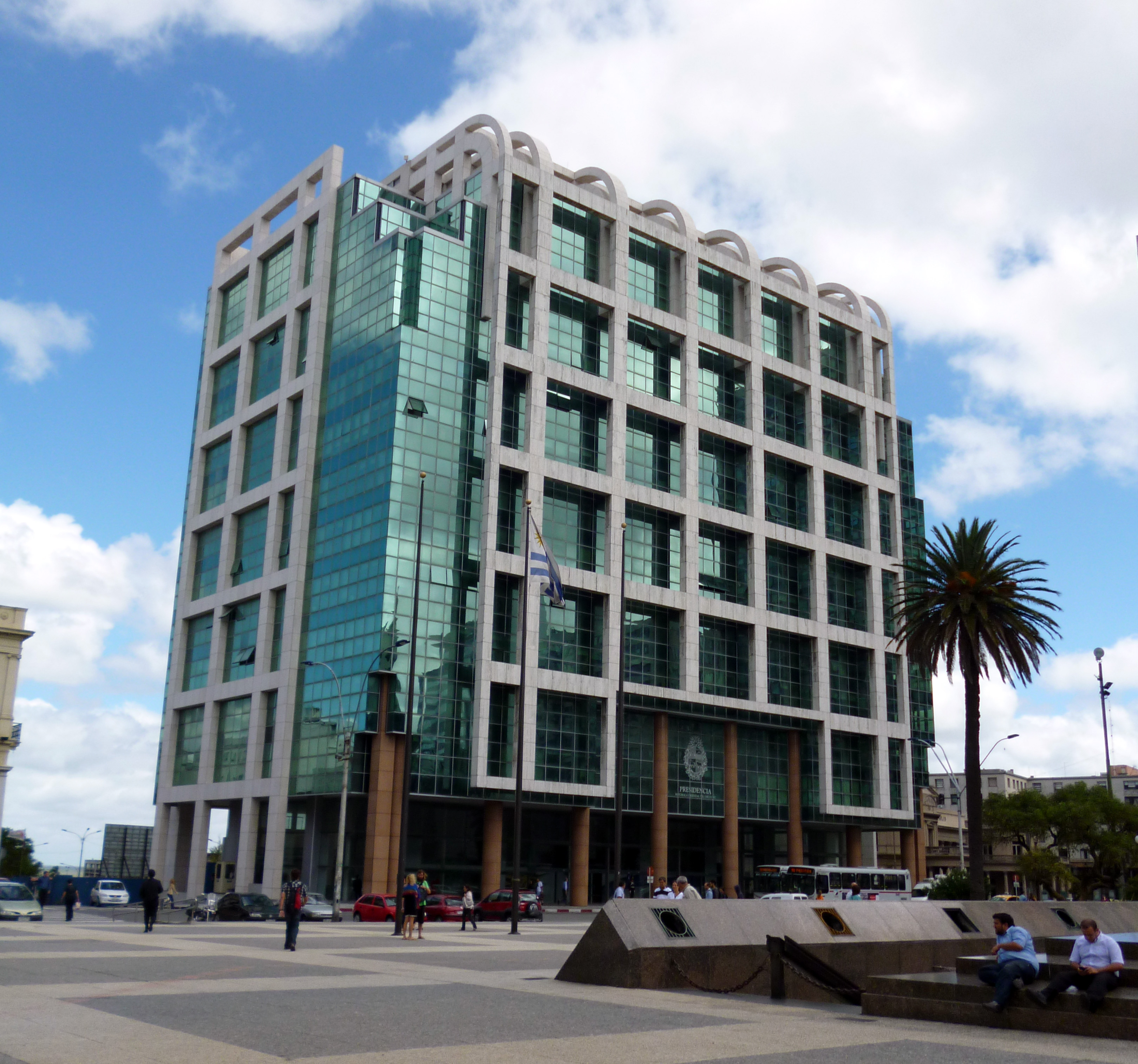
Executive Tower seats the executive power.

== Executive branch ==
Uruguay's Constitution of 1967 created a strong presidency, subject to legislative and judicial balance. Many of these provisions were suspended in 1973 but reestablished in 1985. The president, who is both the head of state and the head of government, is elected by popular vote for a five-year term, with the vice president elected on the same ticket. The president must act together with the Council of Ministers, which comprises cabinet ministers, appointed by the president. Thirteen ministers head various executive departments. The ministers can be removed by the General Assembly by a majority vote.

The Constitution amendment establishes the requirements for becoming president. Article 151 establishes that the president must be a natural-born citizen of the country, or have been born to a Uruguayan citizen if born abroad. The president must also be at least 35 years old and be registered in the National Civic Registry. The current president since 1 March 2025 is Yamandú Orsi.

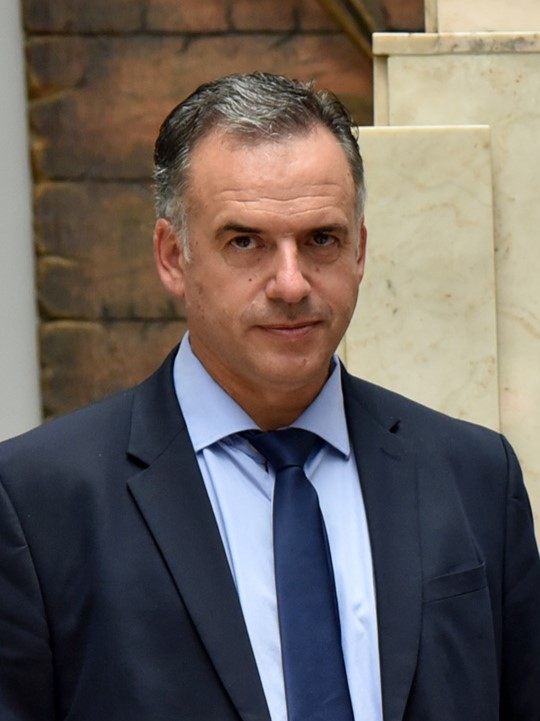
Yamandú Orsi, a former Intendant of Canelones Department, is the current president of Uruguay since 1 March 2025

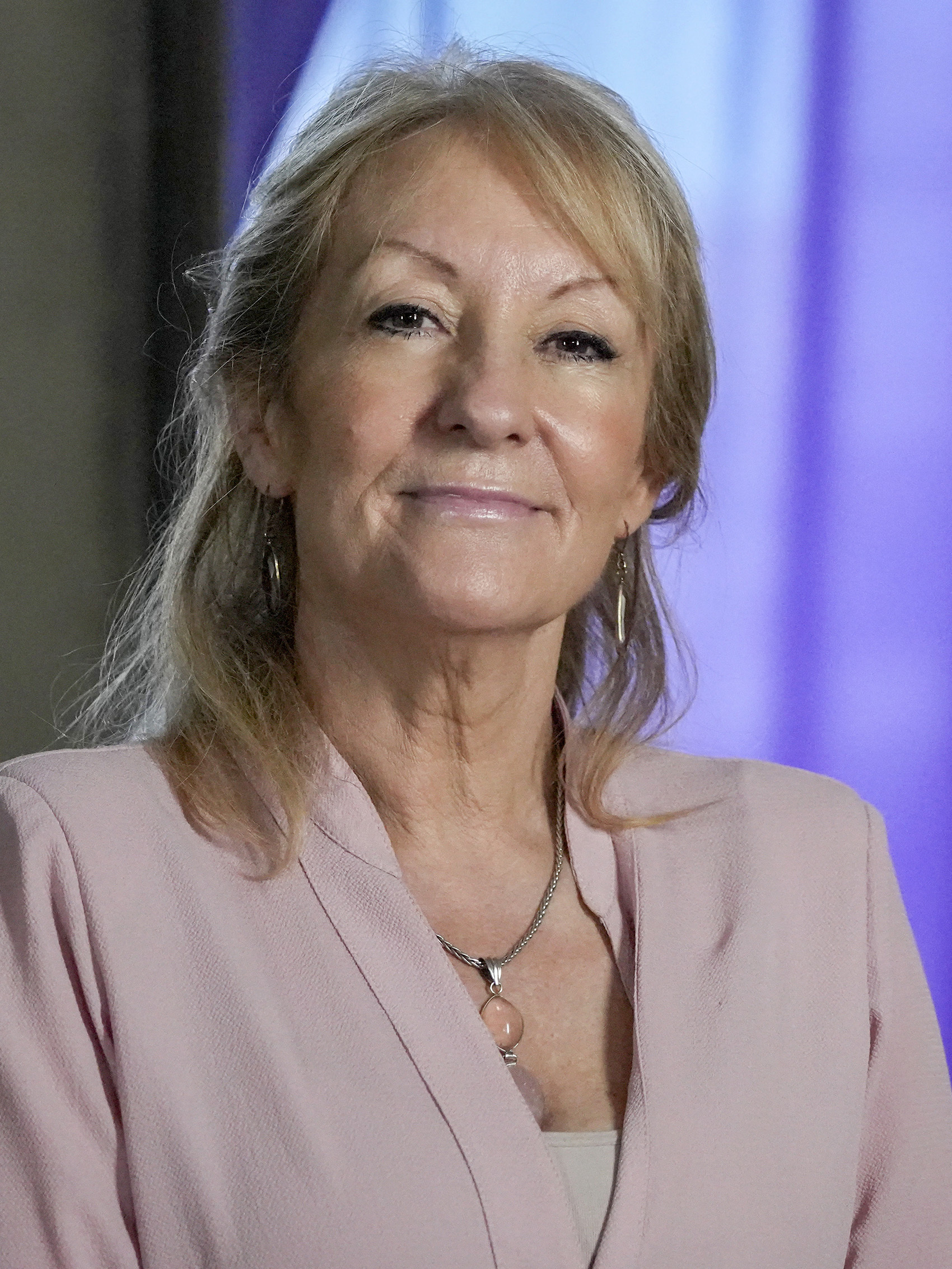
Carolina Cosse, a former Intendant of Montevideo, is the current vice president of Uruguay since 1 March 2025

== Legislative branch ==
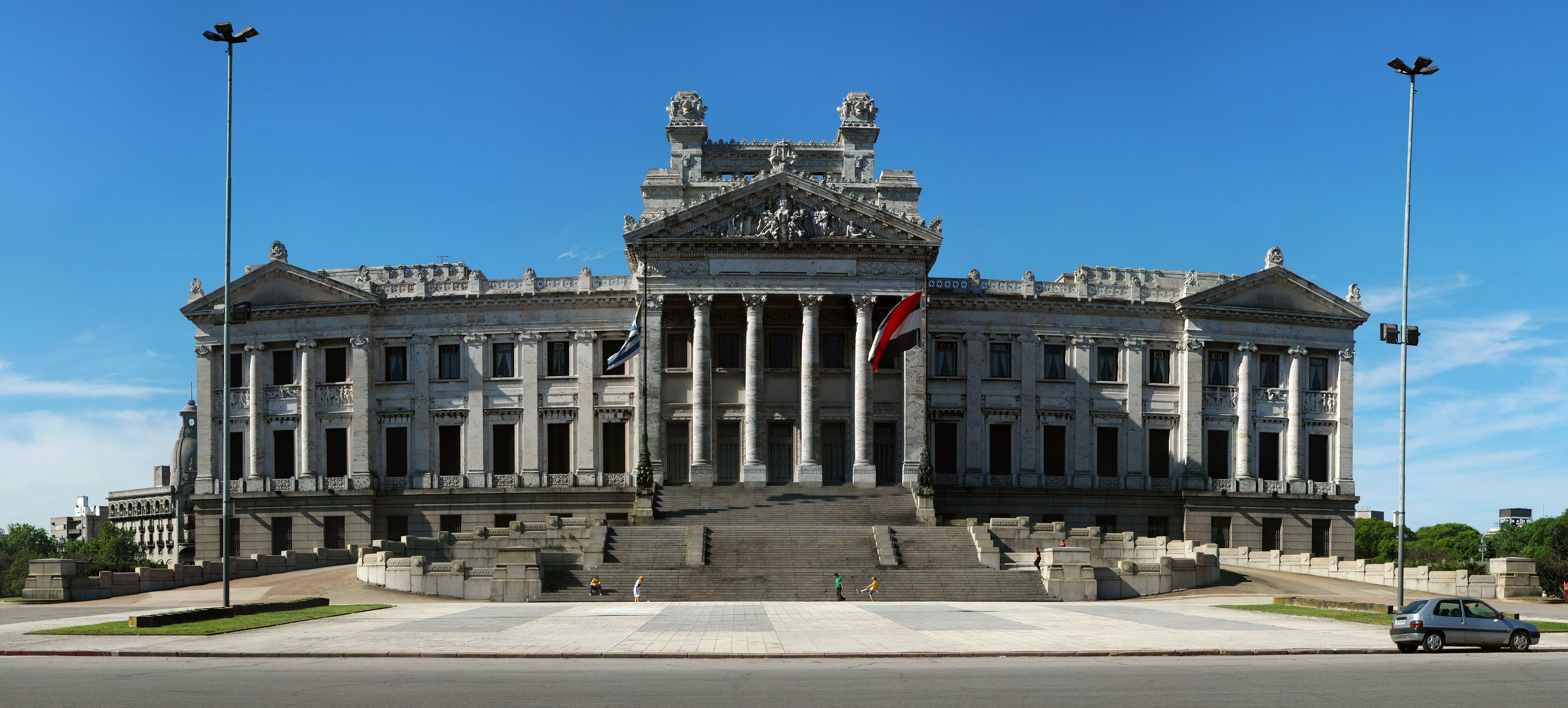
Legislative Palace, seat of the General Assembly of Uruguay

The General Assembly (Asamblea General) has two chambers. The Chamber of Representatives (Cámara de Representantes) has 99 members, elected for a five-year term by proportional representation with at least two members per department. The Chamber of Senators (Cámara de Senadores) has 31 members; 30 members are elected for a five-year term by proportional representation and the Vice-president who presides over it.

== Judicial branch ==
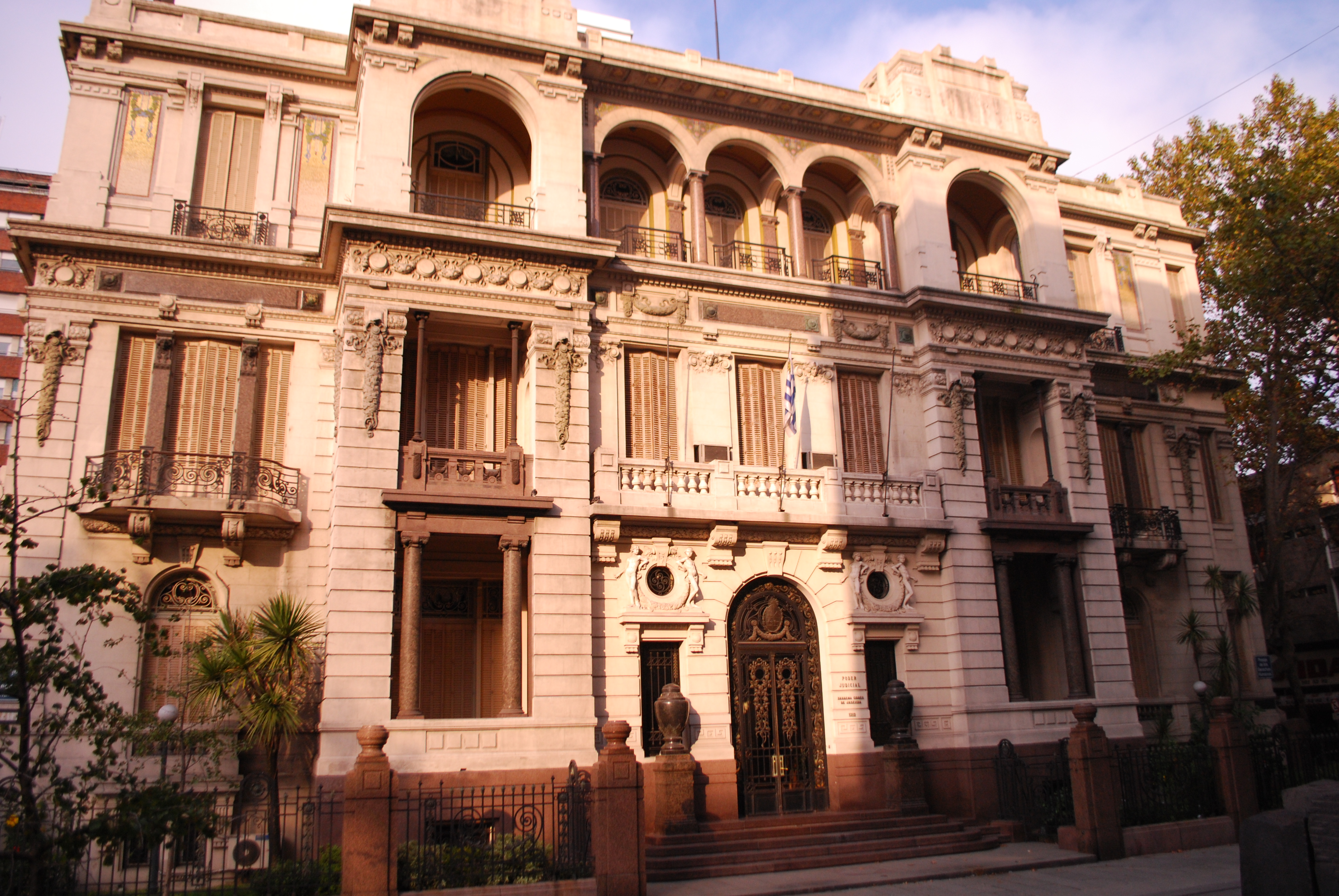
Palacio Piria, seat of the judiciary

The judiciary of Uruguay is headed by the Supreme Court of Justice, whose members are appointed by the General Assembly through a two-thirds majority and whose terms last ten years. The Supreme Court of Justice is the last instance of appeal and is also in charge of judging the constitutionality of the laws. The judiciary is also made up of Courts of Appeals, District Courts and Peace Courts, as well as Conciliation Courts, Mediation Centers, and Misdemeanour Courts. Other dependencies of the Uruguayan judiciary are the Public Defender Office, the Forensic Technical Institute, and the Center for Judiciary Studies.

== Direct democracy ==
The Uruguayan political system allows citizens to use direct democracy mechanisms to directly take political decisions on the current legal system without intermediaries. These mechanisms are the referendums to repeal recently approved laws, plebiscites to propose changes to the Constitution and the power of citizens to drive popular initiatives such as to propose referendums, to propose law drafts to the Parliament, to reform the Constitution and to deal with departmental matters.

== Political parties and elections ==
| Party | Presidential candidate | First round | | Second round | | Seats | | | |
| Party | Presidential candidate | Votes | % | Votes | % | Chamber | +/– | Senate | +/– |
|---|---|---|---|---|---|---|---|---|---|
| Broad Front | Daniel Martínez | 949,376 | 40.49 | 1,152,271 | 49.21 | 42 | –8 | 13 | –2 |
| National Party | Luis Alberto Lacalle Pou | 696,452 | 29.70 | 1,189,313 | 50.79 | 30 | –2 | 10 | 0 |
| Colorado Party | Ernesto Talvi | 300,177 | 12.80 | | | 13 | 0 | 4 | 0 |
| Open Cabildo | Guido Manini Ríos | 268,736 | 11.46 | | | 11 | New | 3 | New |
| Partido Ecologista Radical Intransigente | César Vega | 33,461 | 1.43 | | | 1 | +1 | 0 | 0 |
| Partido de la Gente | Edgardo Novick | 26,313 | 1.12 | | | 1 | +1 | 0 | 0 |
| Independent Party | Pablo Mieres | 23,580 | 1.01 | | | 1 | –2 | 0 | –1 |
| Popular Unity | Gonzalo Abella | 19,728 | 0.84 | | | 0 | –1 | 0 | 0 |
| Green Animalist Party | Gustavo Salle | 19,392 | 0.83 | | | 0 | New | 0 | New |
| Digital Party | Daniel Goldman | 6,363 | 0.27 | | | 0 | New | 0 | New |
| Workers' Party | Rafael Fernández Rodríguez | 1,387 | 0.06 | | | 0 | 0 | 0 | 0 |
| Total | | 2,344,965 | 100.00 | 2,341,584 | 100.00 | 99 | 0 | 30 | 0 |
| Valid votes | | 2,344,965 | 96.37 | 2,341,584 | 96.23 | | | | |
| Invalid votes | | 44,802 | 1.84 | 53,588 | 2.20 | | | | |
| Blank votes | | 43,597 | 1.79 | 38,024 | 1.56 | | | | |
| Total votes | | 2,433,364 | 100.00 | 2,433,196 | 100.00 | | | | |
| Registered voters/turnout | | 2,699,978 | 90.13 | 2,699,980 | 90.12 | | | | |
Source: Corte Electoral (first round); Corte Electoral (second round)

== International organization participation ==
Uruguay or Uruguayan organizations participate in the following international organizations:

- The Food and Agriculture Organization (FAO)
- Group of 77 (G-77)
- Inter-American Development Bank (IADB)
- International Atomic Energy Agency (IAEA)
- International Bank for Reconstruction and Development (World Bank)
- International Civil Aviation Organization (ICAO)
- International Criminal Court (ICC)
- International Chamber of Commerce (ICC)
- International Red Cross
- International Fund for Agricultural Development (IFAD)
- International Finance Corporation (IFC)
- International Federation of Red Cross and Red Crescent Societies (IFRCS)
- International Hydrographic Organization (IHO)
- International Labour Organization (ILO)
- International Monetary Fund (IMF)
- International Maritime Organization (IMO)
- Interpol
- International Olympic Committee (IOC)
- International Organization for Migration (IOM)
- International Organization for Standardization (ISO)
- International Telecommunication Union (ITU)
- Latin American Economic System (LAES)
- Latin American Integration Association (LAIA)
- Mercosur
- United Nations Mission for the Referendum in Western Sahara (MINURSO)
- United Nations Organization Mission in the Democratic Republic of the Congo (MONUC)
- Non-Aligned Movement (NAM) (observer)
- Organization of American States (OAS)
- Agency for the Prohibition of Nuclear Weapons in Latin America and the Caribbean (OPANAL)
- Organisation for the Prohibition of Chemical Weapons (OPCW)
- Permanent Court of Arbitration (PCA)
- Rio Group (RG)
- Union of South American Nations (UNASUR)
- United Nations
- United Nations Mission in Sierra Leone (UNAMSIL)
- United Nations Conference on Trade and Development (UNCTAD)
- United Nations Educational, Scientific, and Cultural Organization (UNESCO)
- United Nations Industrial Development Organization (UNIDO)
- United Nations Mission in Ethiopia and Eritrea (UNMEE)
- United Nations Mission of Support in East Timor (UNMISET)
- United Nations Military Observer Group in India and Pakistan (UNMOGIP)
- United Nations Mission of Observers in Tajikistan (UNMOT)
- United Nations Observer Mission in Georgia (UNOMIG)
- Universal Postal Union (UPU)
- World Confederation of Labour (WCL)
- World Customs Organization (WCO)
- World Federation of Trade Unions (WFTU)
- World Health Organization (WHO)
- World Intellectual Property Organization (WIPO)
- World Meteorological Organization (WMO)
- World Tourism Organization (WToO)
- World Trade Organization (WTO)
