= Andrés Ojeda =

Uruguayan lawyer and politician (born 1984)

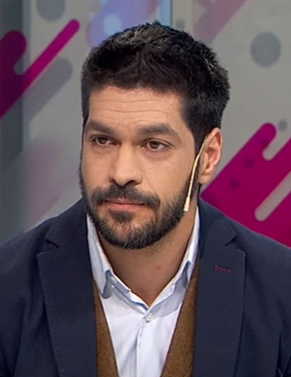
- Ojeda in 2024

Senator of the Republic
- Incumbent
- Assumed office 15 February 2025

Secretary General of the Colorado Party
- Incumbent
- Assumed office 23 December 2024

Member of the Montevideo Legislature
- In office 8 July 2010 – 9 July 2015

Personal details
- Born: Andrés Ojeda Spitz; 5 January 1984 (age 42) Montevideo, Uruguay
- Party: Colorado
- Spouse: Natalie Yoffe (m. 2017; div. 2023)
- Education: University of the Republic; University of Montevideo; Austral University
- Occupation: Lawyer; politician; television personality

Andrés Ojeda Spitz (born 5 January 1984) is a Uruguayan lawyer, television personality and politician, serving as secretary general of the Colorado Party. He was the party's candidate for president in the 2024 general election in which he finished in third place.

Ojeda was born in Montevideo and obtained a law degree from the University of the Republic. He specialized in criminal law, and gained wide public recognition as a criminal defense attorney and television pundit. He began his political career in 2010 and focused on Montevideo politics, as a member of the department's legislature from 2010 to 2015, and as a candidate for substitute departamental Intendant in 2020.

== Early life and education ==
Ojeda was born in Montevideo, the son of Luis Enrique Ojeda and Patricia Spitz. He is of Irish and German descent; his paternal great-great-grandfather was an Irish national who came to Uruguay to work on the railroad, while his maternal grandfather was a German lawyer.

He attended La Mennais School in the Punta Gorda neighborhood. In his childhood he was part of the Scout Movement. In 2002 he enrolled at the University of the Republic from which he graduated as a lawyer in 2011. He subsequently obtained a postgraduate degree in Economic Criminal Law from the University of Montevideo and in 2018 a diploma in oral criminal litigation from the American University Washington College of Law. In 2022 he completed a master's degree in criminal law from the Austral University in Buenos Aires.

== Legal and media career ==
While still at university, Ojeda began working as an assistant at a law firm in Montevideo, and upon graduating worked as a junior attorney. He later worked in the legal area of an insurance company. In 2015 he was the defense attorney of the prominent former tupamaro guerrilla fighter and deserter Héctor Amodio Pérez, which increased his public exposure. Due to his growing popularity in the media, he was offered to venture into television as a legal columnist on Telenoche, Channel 4's prime-time news program. Months later he joined the morning show Buen día Uruguay to present a weekly column on criminal law in which he analyzed real-life cases.

In 2016, Ojeda joined the cable channel VTV's newscast, also as a television pundit. Since then has been a legal columnist in El País newspaper and appeared on several television programs, which contributed to his increased notoriety. He also serves as an attorney for the police union, and runs his own law firm, Andres Ojeda Abogados, which has been rated "excellent" in the white-collar crime dispute resolution category by Paris-based consulting firm Leaders League.

== Political career ==
While in college, Ojeda joined Foro Universitario, a student union with Batllist ideology. In 2002, after attending an event that had former president Julio María Sanguinetti as the main speaker, he decided to join the Colorado Party. In the 2009 presidential primaries he campaigned for the pre-candidacy of Luis Antonio Hierro López, and then for Pedro Bordaberry, who was the party's candidate in the general election.

In the 2010 municipal election he was elected member of the Montevideo legislature for the period 2010–2015. He later joined Ciudadanos, a faction led by Ernesto Talvi, and was his advisor on public security in the 2019 presidential campaign. In the 2020 municipal election he was Laura Raffo's first substitute for the position of Intendant of Montevideo as representative of the Colorado Party in the Coalición Multicolor. Raffo was the individual candidate with the most votes, but she was not elected due to the double simultaneous voting system.

== 2024 presidential campaign ==
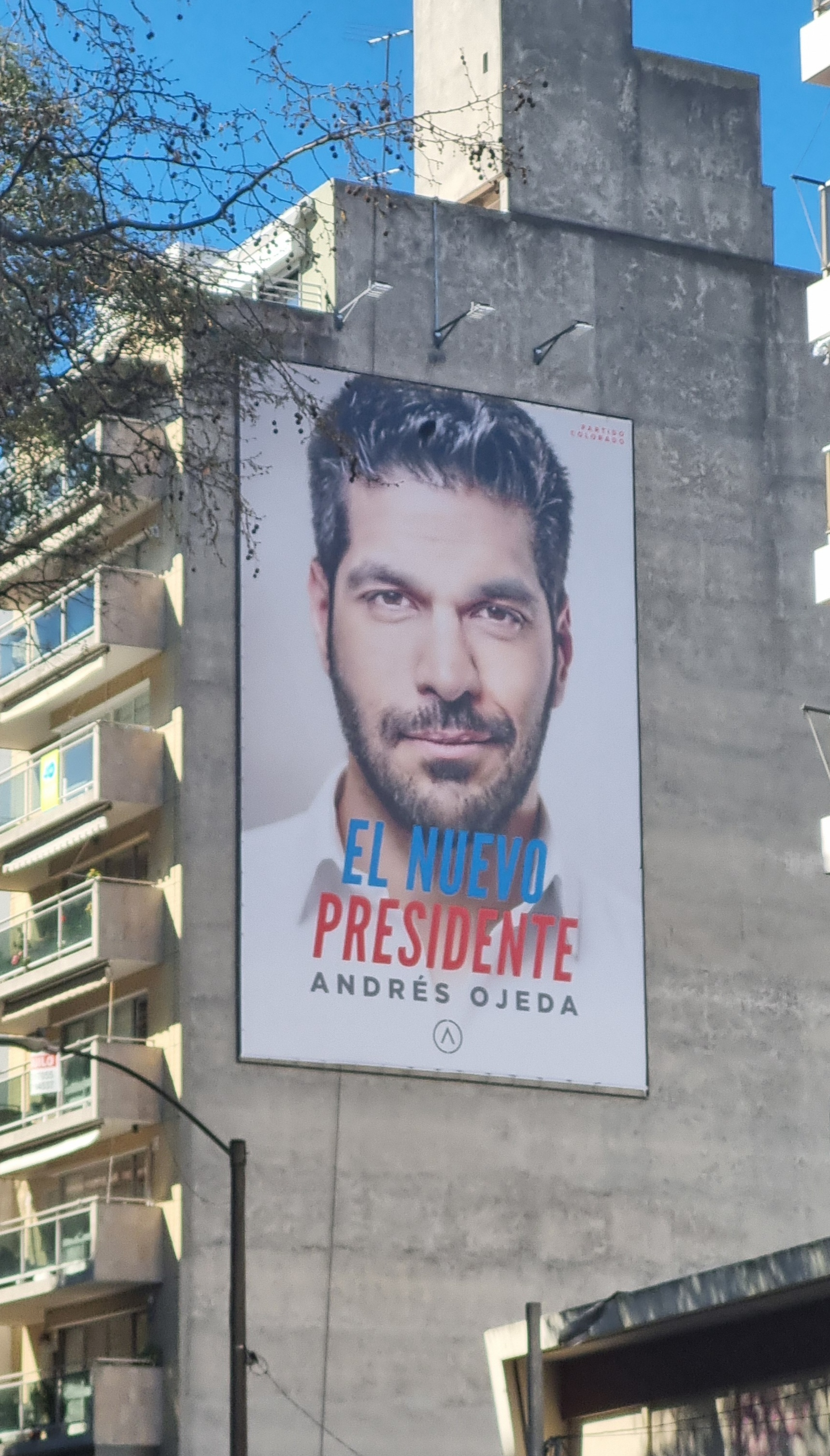
Ojeda's billboard in Montevideo, reading "The new president"

Since 2021, Ojeda began to be considered as a possible candidate in the 2024 Colorado Party presidential primaries, as a figure of generational change for the party. He finally announced his pre-candidacy on November 11, 2023. In mid-November, he was polling at about 4% in national Colorado primary opinion polls, according to Equipo Consultores.

He focused his campaign on issues such as mental health and the environment, and advocated for a renewal of the Uruguayan political scene. He received the endorsement of the Open Cabildo parliamentarian Elsa Capillera and Gustavo Zubía, who on April 17, 2024 withdrew his candidacy. In June, former soccer player and 1995 Copa América champion with the national football team Fernando Álvez announced that he would support Ojeda's candidacy and would be a candidate for the Chamber of Representatives. Ojeda had disagreements with his party partner and also candidate Guzmán Acosta y Lara, who accused him of being "anti-colorado" and part of an "extra-party invasion".

On June 30, 2024, Ojeda won the Colorado primary with 39.5% of the vote. The following day, he announced Robert Silva, who came in second with 22,4%, as his running mate and vice presidential candidate. This was Silva's second vice presidential bid, having been Ernesto Talvi's running mate in the 2019 general election. On August 17, Ojeda and Silva were officially nominated at the Colorado Party Convention.

On August 29, he presented the manifesto of his candidacy. During the campaign, he pointed to mental health and animal welfare as two major issues of his political platform. Regarding the constitutional referendums to be voted on in the general election, Ojeda has positioned himself in favor of the one that reforms the Constitution to allow nighttime raids by security forces, and against the one referring to social security and proposed by the PIT-CNT.

In the general election, Ojeda finished in third place after obtaining 16.03% of the votes. Compared to the 2019 election, the Colorado Party increased its parliamentary representation, gaining one more senator and four more representatives. Ojeda himself was elected to the Senate for the first time. After the results were announced, he expressed his support for Álvaro Delgado Ceretta for the second round, as a member of the Republican Coalition.

In December 2024, he was elected general secretary of the Colorado Party by its National Executive Committee.

== Personal life ==
Ojeda married model, actress and television personality Natalie Yoffe in October 2017 after two years of relationship. Prominent personalities from politics and the entertainment scene were invited to the ceremony. In April 2023, the couple divorced, after separating permanently the previous year. In November 2024, he publicly introduced his new girlfriend, the Montevideo-based American Kelsey Clay.
