= Irene Moreira =

Uruguayan lawyer, businesswoman and politician

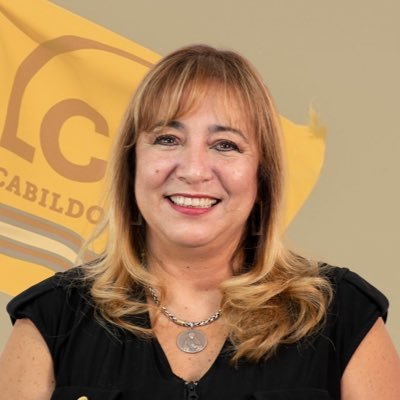

Senator of the Republic
- In office 8 May 2023 – 15 February 2025
- Preceded by: Raúl Lozano Bonet
- In office 15 February 2020 – 1 March 2020
- Succeeded by: Raúl Lozano Bonet

Minister of Housing and Territorial Planning of Uruguay
- In office 1 March 2020 – 5 May 2023
- President: Luis Lacalle Pou
- Preceded by: Eneida de León
- Succeeded by: Raúl Lozano Bonet

Personal details
- Born: Irene Renée Moreira Fernández; 11 August 1964 (age 62) Montevideo, Uruguay
- Party: National (1984–2019); Open Cabildo (2019–present)
- Spouse: Guido Manini Ríos (m. 1986)
- Children: Bruno, Micaela
- Education: Catholic University of Uruguay

Irene Renée Moreira Fernández (born 11 August 1964) is a Uruguayan lawyer, rural businesswoman and politician of Open Cabildo (CA) who served as Minister of Housing and Territorial Planning of Uruguay from March 1, 2020 to May 5, 2023.

== Education ==
Moreira enrolled at the University of the Republic, where she studied three years of Law. However, after the birth of her children she dropped out of school. Later, she resumed her studies at the Catholic University and graduated from it.

== Political career ==
Moreira began her militancy for the National Party in the Artigas Department. There she served, for three periods, as deputy edila in the Artigas Departmental Board. From 2015 to 2020 she served as incumbent edila heading the 404 list of Luis Lacalle Pou. In that legislature she integrated the Committee on Culture and Gender.

In the 2014 general election, Moreira was a candidate for deputy in the Chamber of Representatives, without being elected.

In April 2019, after the foundation of Open Cabildo, Moreira decided to change her political affiliation to accompany her husband's presidential candidacy, so she left the National Party.

In the 2019 general election, she was a candidate for Senator of the Republic by Open Cabildo, being elected to the 49th Legislature. However, after the victory of Luis Lacalle Pou as President of Uruguay, she was appointed Minister of Housing, Territorial Planning and Environment, as a member of a party that makes up the electoral alliance, Coalición Multicolor. On February 15, 2020, she assumed her seat in the Senate pending her inauguration as head of the ministerial portfolio, on March 1. Her seat was occupied by Raúl Lozano Bonet, her first substitute.

== Personal life ==
Daughter of Roque Moreira, a retired colonel from the National Army, she first met Guido Manini Ríos at a wedding, when he was 21 and she was 15 years old. When she came of age, they entered into a relationship, and after three years they were married in the Sacred Heart Church. Together they have two children: Bruno and Micaela.
