= Guillermo Domenech =

Uruguayan politician

Senator of Uruguay
- In office 15 February 2020 – 15 February 2025

Chairman of the Open Cabildo Party
- In office 10 March 2019 – 3 April 2024
- Succeeded by: Raúl Lozano Bonet

Personal details
- Born: Guillermo José Domenech Martínez; 17 September 1950 (age 76) Montevideo, Uruguay
- Party: Open Cabildo Party
- Education: University of the Republic
- Occupation: Lawyer, notary, politician

Guillermo José Domenech Martínez (born 17 September 1950) is a Uruguayan lawyer, notary and politician.

Born in Montevideo, Domenech attended St. Catherine's School and Ivy Thomas Memorial School, graduated from University of the Republic, where he studied law and notary. He served as a government notary, in the President's Office, from 1990 to 2019.

== Political career ==
In the 1989 elections he presented a list to the House of Representatives of the National Party Herrerism faction in support of Luis Alberto Lacalle, but he was not elected. In 2019, Domenech participated in the founding of the Open Cabildo Party, which proposed the candidacy of former Army Commander-in-Chief Guido Manini Ríos. In October, it was reported that Domenech would be the vice presidential running mate of Manini Ríos for the 2019 General Election.

In the 2019 general election, he was elected Senator for the 49th Legislature. He assumed that position, on February 15, 2020.
