= Daniel Bianchi =

Uruguayan politician (1962–2025)

Member of the Senate of Uruguay
- In office 9 March 2016 – 15 February 2020
- Preceded by: Martha Montaner

Member of the Chamber of Representatives of Uruguay
- In office 15 February 2000 – 9 March 2016
- Succeeded by: Nibia Reisch

Personal details
- Born: Daniel Mario Bianchi Salomón; 4 September 1962 Carmelo, Uruguay
- Died: 1 October 2025 (aged 63)
- Party: PC (1990s–2016); Partido de la Gente (2016–2019); CA (2021–2023); PN (2023–2025)
- Education: University of the Republic
- Occupation: Doctor

Daniel Mario Bianchi Salomón (4 September 1962 – 1 October 2025) was a Uruguayan politician. A member of the Colorado Party, the Partido de la Gente, Cabildo Abierto and the National Party, he served in the Chamber of Representatives from 2000 to 2016 and in the Senate from 2016 to 2020.

== Biography and political career ==
He was elected representative of Colonia in 1999 for the Colorado Party's list 15, then re-elected in 2004 and 2009. In 2009, he joined Vamos Uruguay, a faction led by Pedro Bordaberry. In 2016, after his election to the Senate, he left the Colorado Party to join the Partido de la Gente of businessman Edgardo Novick.

He was expelled from that political party in 2019 for causing a traffic accident while under the influence of alcohol. After a judicial investigation was launched due to the removal of his immunity, Bianchi returned to his seat that same year, but as an independent.

He joined Cabildo Abierto in 2021, then the National Party in 2023.

Bianchi died on 1 October 2025, at the age of 63.
