= María Eugenia Roselló =

Uruguayan politician (born 1981)

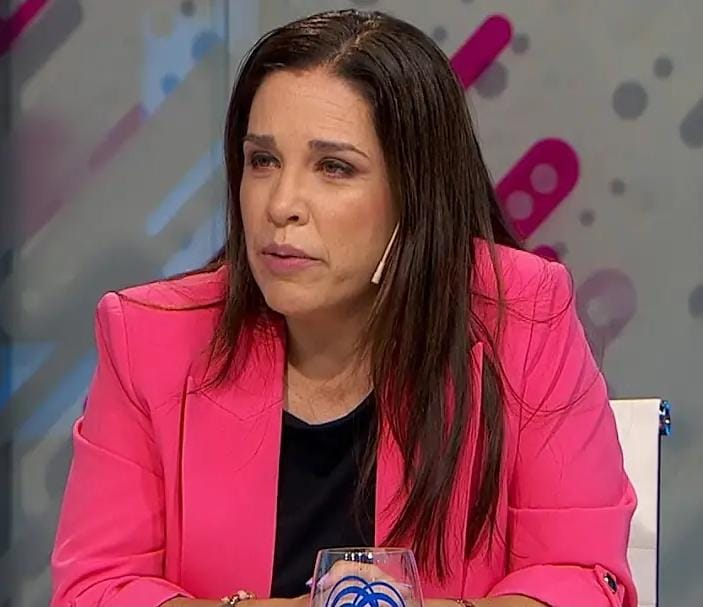
- Roselló in 2024

Secretary of the Senate of Uruguay
- Incumbent
- Assumed office April 2025

Secretary General of Montevideo
- Incumbent
- Assumed office December 2024

Member of the Chamber of Representatives of Uruguay
- Incumbent
- Assumed office 15 February 2020

Personal details
- Born: 29 November 1981 (age 44) Montevideo, Uruguay
- Party: Colorado Party (Uruguay)

María Eugenia Roselló (born 29 November 1981) is a Uruguayan civil servant and Colorado Party politician. She has been a Member of the Chamber of Representatives of Uruguay since 2020.

== Biography ==
Roselló has worked as a civil servant at the Solidarity Fund. In 2002, Roselló became a member of the Colorado Party.

Since the 2019 Uruguayan general election, Roselló has been a Member of the Chamber of Representatives of Uruguay in the 49th Legislature of the Chamber of Deputies of Uruguay. She has presented bills to the Chamber regarding menstrual products, sex work, and the right to access assisted reproduction treatments in the country.

In December 2024, Roselló was appointed as Secretary General of Montevideo by the Departmental Executive Committee (CED) of the Colorado Party.

In April 2025, she became Secretary of the Senate of Uruguay.
