= Eduardo Lust =

Uruguayan politician (born 1959)

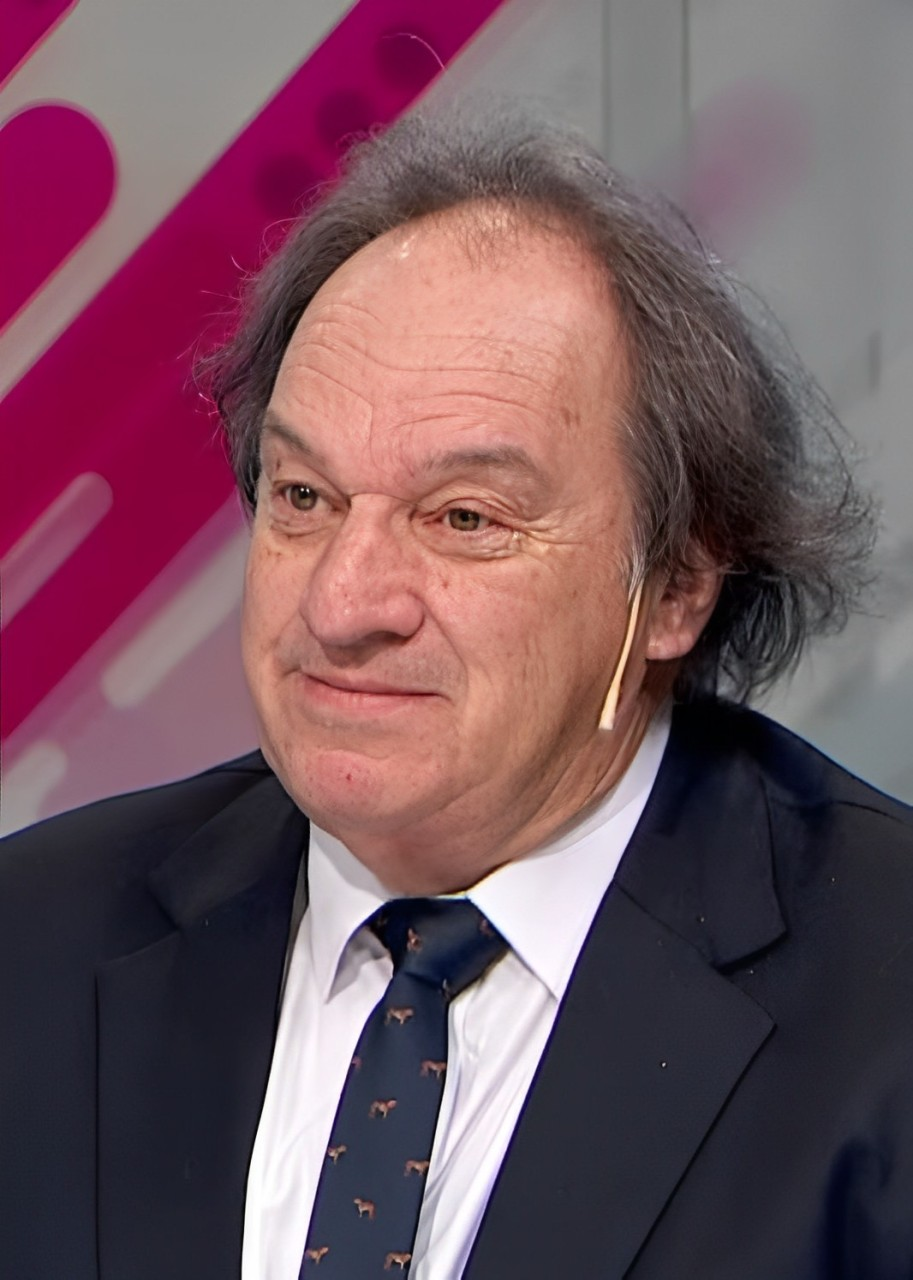

National Representative of Uruguay
- In office 15 February 2020 – 15 February 2025
- Constituency: Montevideo

Personal details
- Born: Eduardo Manuel Lust Hitta; 30 October 1959 (age 66) Paysandú, Uruguay
- Party: Cabildo Abierto (2019–2023); Environmental Constitutional Party (2023–present)
- Children: 3
- Education: University of the Republic

Eduardo Manuel Lust Hitta (born 30 October 1959) is a Uruguayan lawyer, lecturer and politician who served as National Representative in the 49th Legislature. A former member of Cabildo Abierto, in December 2023 he founded the Environmental Constitutional Party through which he was a candidate for president of Uruguay in the 2024 general election.

== Early life and education ==
Lust was born in Paysandú, the only son of a couple with four children. His mother was a primary school teacher, and his father a farmer, and both were supporters of the National Party. At 18, he enrolled at the University of the Republic and settled in Montevideo to study law.

After graduating he began his teaching career as a university professor, taking up a teaching post of Constitutional Law. He gained prominence for his opposition to the installation of UPM-2 Paso de los Toros, the second Finnish UPM-Kymmene plant in the country.

== Political career ==
In mid-2019, Lust accepted an invitation from Cabildo Abierto authorities to join the party and be a candidate for the Chamber of Representatives. In the 2019 general election he was elected National Representative for the 49th Legislature (2020–2025). During the parliamentary debate on the Urgent Consideration Law–a bill presented by the coalition government led by Luis Lacalle Pou–he gained significant public exposure for his analysis of the bill's constitutional aspects, drawing on his background as a professor of Constitutional Law.

On February 8, 2023, he announced his departure from Cabildo Abierto, citing philosophical differences with the party leadership. He also announced that he would not resign from his seat, but would remain as independent. During his term as Representative he was in favor of reforming the Code of Criminal Procedure.

In mid-2023, he announced the creation of a new political party with an ecological and green conservative tendency, and in December, the Electoral Court approved the creation of the Environmental Constitutional Party. In the 2024 presidential primaries, the party and Lust as its pre-candidate obtained 1,213 votes, surpassing the threshold of 500 required to participate in the general election. In August, lawyer and academic Luján Criado was confirmed as Lust's vice presidential running mate.

During the campaign, he announced that in the event of a runoff, he would support Álvaro Delgado Ceretta, the National Party nominee who was in second place in the polls. In the general election, Lust obtained 0.49% of the vote, failing to win a seat in parliament. He also announced his support for Delgado Ceretta for the runoff and his party joined the Republican Coalition.

After completing his term in the Chamber of Representatives, Lust became increasingly active in digital media. He launched his own streaming program, in which he discusses constitutional law and current political issues. He also began contributing a regular column to the radio program Malos Pensamientos, offering legal analysis of current affairs and historical topics. His work in streaming and radio increased his public visibility, contributing to a broader public profile beyond his political career.

== Personal life ==
He is married, and has three children: Sofía, Julieta and Hernán.
