= Republican Coalition =

Republican Coalition Coalición Republicana
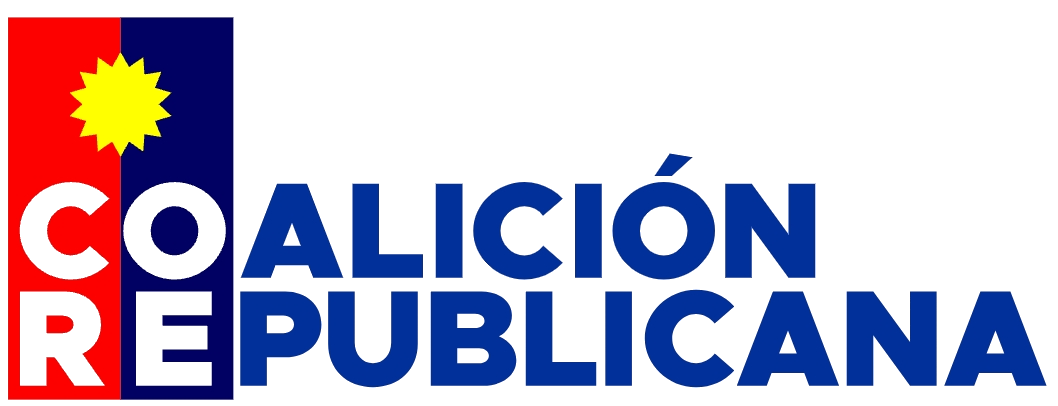
- Leader: Luis Lacalle Pou
- Founded: 27 October 2019
- Headquarters: Montevideo
- Ideology: Christian democracy; Liberalism (Uruguayan); Conservatism
- Political position: Centre-right to right-wing
- Senate: 14 / 30
- Chamber of Representatives: 49 / 99
- Intendencias: 16 / 19
- Mayors: 93 / 125
- Politics of Uruguay; Political parties; Elections; A: The coalition also contains a centrist party and a far-right party.

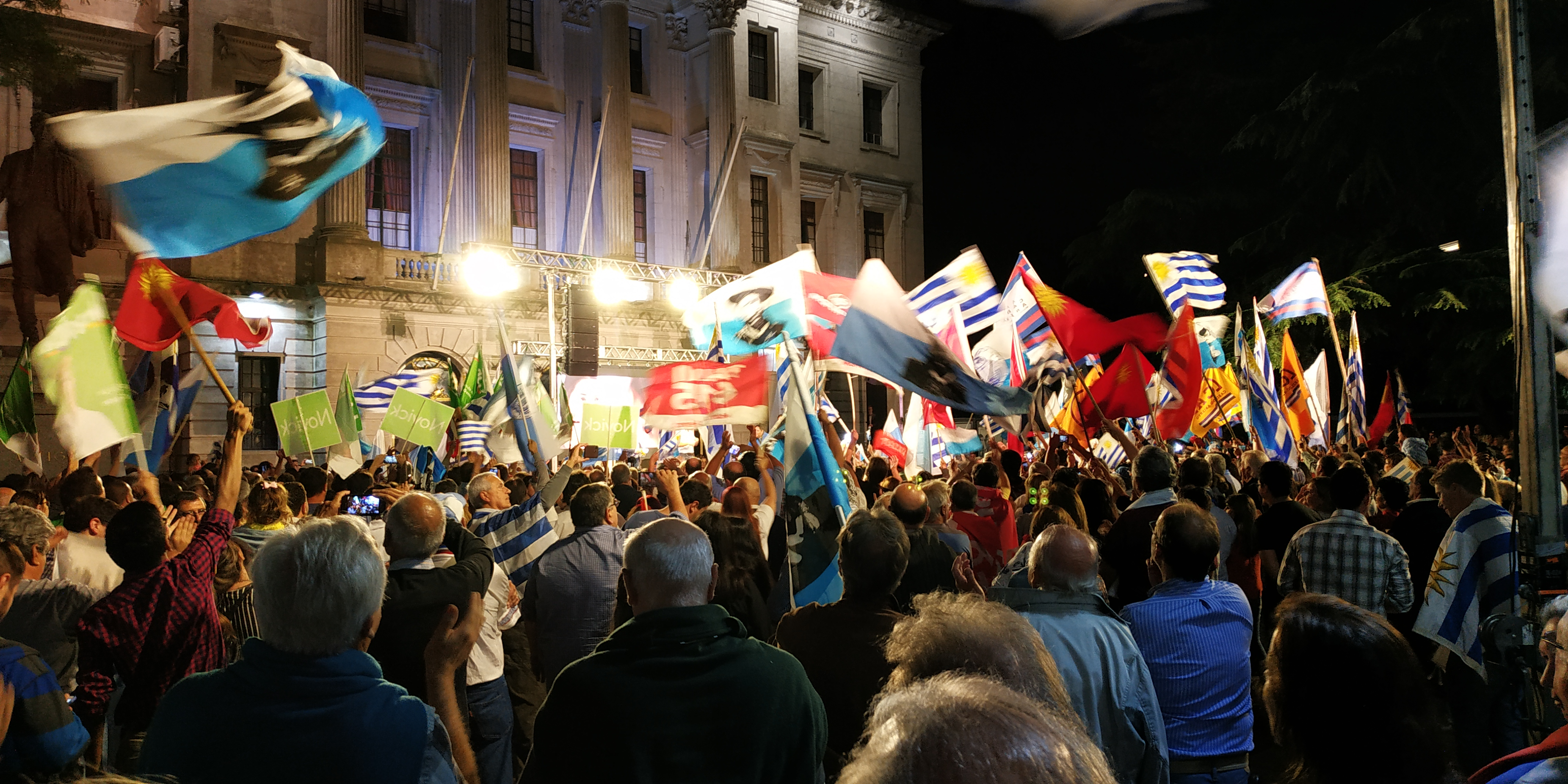
Political rally in Colonia del Sacramento.

The Republican Coalition (Spanish: Coalición Republicana), previously known as the Multicolor Coalition (Spanish: Coalición Multicolor), is a right wing political coalition formed in Uruguay in 2019.

It is led by Uruguayan ex-president Luis Lacalle Pou and is composed of Lacalle's centre-right National Party (PN) and center-right Colorado Party (PC), the far-right Open Cabildo (CA), the centrist Independent Party (PI), and the right-wing Party of the People (PG).

This alliance competed in the 2019 general elections against the Broad Front (FA). The Luis Lacalle Pou-Beatriz Argimón ticket was elected President of the Republic and Vice President respectively.

== History ==
In May 2019, the former president of Uruguay, Julio María Sanguinetti expressed himself favouring a political alliance to compete with the ruling party in the general elections. According to the statements, the Colorado Party, the National Party and the Independent Party should be included.

At the beginning of September 2019, the then candidate for the PN, Luis Lacalle Pou, expressed to Argentine businessmen that in Uruguay an alternation in power was taking place in which there would have to be an agreement between "four or five opposition parties", which he later referred to as "Multicolor Coalition". On the night of 27 October, the day the general election was held, after knowing the projections of results, Ernesto Talvi, Guido Manini Ríos and Edgardo Novick announced their support of Lacalle Pou in the second round.

Pablo Mieres said that if certain agreements were reached, his party would support Lacalle Pou, which became official a few days later. On 5 November, the «Commitment for the Country» was presented, a basic document of programmatic agreement between the different parties that make up the Multicolor Coalition.

On 24 November, the election was held, in which Lacalle Pou was victorious against Daniel Martínez (50.79% to 49.21%). The adjusted result, regarding what the voting intention polls marked, prevented from officially knowing the winner on the same night of the election, since the difference that resulted from the primary scrutiny was less than the number of votes observed.

== Presidential election ==
In the first round held on 27 October, the sum of the votes of the parties that would later take part in the coalition was 1,315,258.29 corresponding to 56.09% of the valid votes. In the second round held on 24 November, the Lacalle Pou-Beatriz Argimón ticket received 1,189,313 votes, in this case corresponding to 50.79% of the valid votes, surpassing the Daniel Martínez-Graciela Villar ticket in all departments of the country except for Montevideo and Canelones.

Year	Presidential ticket		First round		Second round		Notes
Year	President	Vice President	Votes	%	Votes	%	Notes
2019	Luis Alberto Lacalle Pou	Beatriz Argimón	1,315,258	56.09	1,189,313	50.79	In the first round the coalition was not formed (result is sum of the members).
2024	Álvaro Delgado	Valeria Ripoll	655,426	28.20	1,101,296	47.92	

== Legislative election ==
=== Chamber of Representatives ===
Year	Votes	%	Seats	Notes
2019			56 / 99	The parliamentary elections are simultaneous to the first round of the presidential elections; the coalition was not formed (result is sum of the members).
2024			49 / 99	The parliamentary elections are simultaneous to the first round of the presidential elections; the coalition was not formed (result is sum of the members).

=== Senate ===
Year	Votes	%	Seats	Notes
2019			17 / 30	The parliamentary elections are simultaneous to the first round of the presidential elections; the coalition was not formed (result is sum of the members).
2024			14 / 30	The parliamentary elections are simultaneous to the first round of the presidential elections; the coalition was not formed (result is sum of the members).

== Legislature in 2020–2025 ==
Party	President	Leader	Seats	
Party	President	Leader	Senators	Representatives
National	Beatriz Argimón	Luis Alberto Lacalle Pou	10 / 30	30 / 99
Colorado	Julio María Sanguinetti	Ernesto Talvi	4 / 30	13 / 99
Open Cabildo	Guillermo Domenech	Guido Manini Ríos	3 / 30	11 / 99
Independent	Pablo Mieres	Pablo Mieres	0 / 30	1 / 99
Party of the People	Edgardo Novick	Edgardo Novick	0 / 30	1 / 99

== Legislature in 2025–2030 ==
Party	Ideology	President	Leader	Seats	
Party	Ideology	President	Leader	Senators	Representatives
National Party	Liberal conservatism Christian democracy	Macarena Rubio	Álvaro Delgado	9 / 30	29 / 99
Colorado Party	Liberalism (Uruguayan)	Andrés Ojeda		5 / 30	17 / 99
Open Cabildo	National conservatism Right-wing populism	Raúl Lozano Bonet	Guido Manini Ríos	0 / 30	2 / 99
Independent Party	Christian humanism	Pablo Mieres		0 / 30	1 / 99
Environmental Constitutional Party	Constitutionalism; Eco-nationalism	Eduardo Lust		0 / 30	0 / 99
