= Raúl Lozano Bonet =

Uruguayan retired military officer and politician

Raúl Lozano
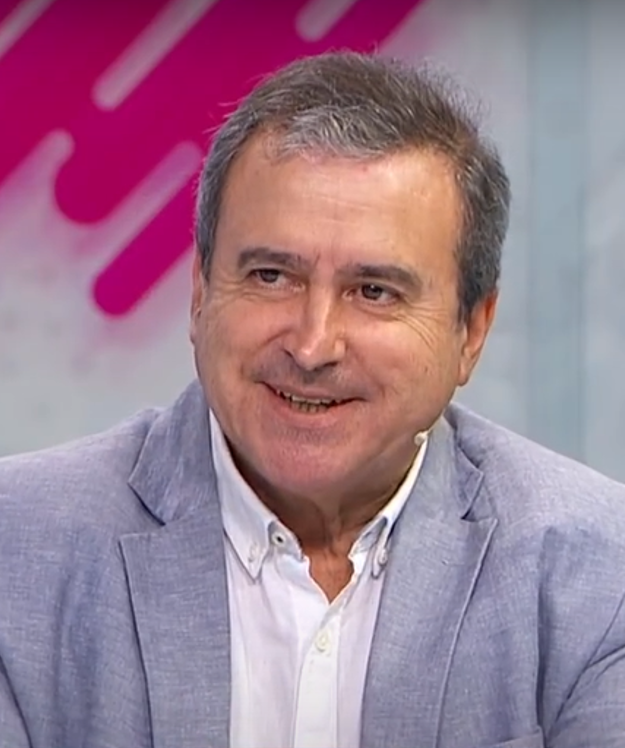
- Lozano Bonet in 2022

Minister of Housing and Territorial Planning of Uruguay
- In office 9 May 2023 – 1 March 2025
- President: Luis Lacalle Pou
- Preceded by: Irene Moreira
- Succeeded by: Cecilia Cairo

Senator of the Republic
- In office 3 March 2020 – 5 May 2023
- Preceded by: Irene Moreira
- Succeeded by: Irene Moreira

Personal details
- Born: Raúl Lozano Bonet; 1 October 1958 (age 68) Montevideo, Uruguay
- Party: Open Cabildo
- Education: Uruguay Military School
- Website: www.rlozano.msartiguista.uy/

Military service
- Allegiance: Uruguay
- Branch/service: National Army of Uruguay
- Years of service: 1978 — 2015
- Rank: Colonel

Raúl Lozano Bonet (born 7 April 1955) is an Uruguayan retired military officer and politician of Open Cabildo (CA). He served as Minister of Housing and Territorial Planning of Uruguay from 2023 to 2025 under President Luis Lacalle Pou.

Lozano served as an officer of the National Army of Uruguay for more than 30 years, in different battalions and artillery groups. He held the positions of Head of Division of the National Directorate of State Intelligence and General Director of the Material and Armament Service. Likewise, he participated in the United Nations peacekeeping missions in Cambodia and the Ivory Coast, and as advisor in the peace negotiations between the Revolutionary Armed Forces of Colombia and the Colombian government. While serving in Cambodia he was kidnapped by the Khmer Rouge and held hostage for several days.

In politics, he is one of the founders of the Movimiento Social Artiguista — Open Cabildo, which participated for the first time in the 2019 general election. From 2020 to 2023 he served as Senator of the Republic. Since April 2024 he is the chairman of Open Cabildo.

== Early life and education ==
Lozano was born in Montevideo, the son of Rogelio Lozano Laporte, colonel of the National Army and Nelly Bonet Sagardoy, a teacher and school principal. He attended Primary School No. 28, Liceo No. 3, Pallotti School, and the Liceo Militar General Artigas.

In 1975 he enrolled at the Uruguay Military School. He graduated as an Ensign of the Artillery on December 21, 1978.

== Political career ==
On November 29, 2018, Lozano was a founding member of the Artiguista Social Movement and Open Cabildo, of which he is, in turn, the vice president. In the 2019 general election, he was elected substitute senator for Irene Moreira for the 49th Legislature. Since Moreira was appointed Minister of Housing and Territorial Planning, Lozano took office on March 3, 2020.

On May 5, 2023, Irene Moreira resigned from her cabinet post at the request of President Lacalle Pou, announcing that she would return to her senatorial seat. Lozano was later chosen as his successor after the Open Cabildo proposal as a member of the government coalition, assuming the ministry on May 9, 2023.
