= Ivy Thomas Memorial School =

School in Montevideo, Uruguay

Ivy Thomas Memorial School is a private bilingual school in Montevideo, Uruguay. Ivy Thomas was founded in 1959 by teacher Elizabeth Thompson de Borrás, who named it after her mother, director of the Windsor School. (Note: Ivy Henrietta Thomas Bottrill, an Anglo-Argentine originally from Buenos Aires, who died in 1954) It offers both primary and secondary education and is based predominantly in the neighbourhood of Pocitos.

== Profile ==
The school places much importance on developing English language ability and is one of the better known private institutions in Uruguay. In 2013, Ivy Thomas, inspired by the Steve Jobs schools in The Netherlands, introduced iPads to classroom teaching.

Like a number of other private schools in Montevideo and Punta Del Este, it has seen increased demand due to an influx of expatriates from Argentina looking to escape the tax regime in their country. In 2018, Ivy Thomas opened a second site outside Montevideo in Camino de los Horneros.

== Notable alumni ==
- Pablo Abdala, politician; National Party representative for Montevideo (2005 – 2020)
- Guillermo Domenech, politician; President of Open Cabildo and Senator (since 2020)
- Ignacio Dotti, rugby player for New Orleans Gold and Uruguay
- Facundo Pellistri, footballer; winger for Manchester United and Uruguay
- Victoria Rodríguez, television presenter (Esta boca es mía)
- Andrew Teuten, footballer; left-back for Montevideo City Torque (2018 – 2021)
- Lucas Bianchi, rugby player for Uruguay
