= 1918 Uruguayan Senate election =

Senate elections were held in Uruguay on 24 November 1918 to elect 6 of the 19 members of the Senate.

== Results ==
Party or alliance		Votes	%	Seats
Colorado Party	Colorado Party	9,744	47.49	5
Colorado Party	Colorado Party (Rivera)	174	0.85	0
Colorado Party	Total	9,918	48.34	5
National Party		7,776	37.90	1
Colorado-National United List		2,824	13.76	0
Total		20,518	100.00	6
Source: Bottinelli et al.
