= 1906 Uruguayan Senate election =

Senate elections were held in Uruguay on 25 November 1906 to elect 6 of the 19 members of the Senate.

== Results ==
Party	Votes	%	Seats
Colorado-National United List	2,861	41.72	–
National Party	2,154	31.41	1
Colorado Party	1,842	26.86	5
Total	6,857	100.00	6
Source: Bottinelli et al.
