= 1902 Uruguayan Senate election =

Senate elections were held in Uruguay on 30 November 1902 to elect 6 of the 19 members of the Senate.

== Results ==
Party	Votes	%	Seats
Colorado Party	2,361	34.64	6
National Party	2,276	33.39	0
Colorado-National United List	2,179	31.97	–
Total	6,816	100.00	6
Source: Bottinelli et al.
