= 1900 Uruguayan Senate election =

Senate elections were held in Uruguay on 25 November 1900 to elect 6 of the 19 members of the Senate.

== Results ==
Party	Votes	%	Seats
Colorado Party	2,887	48.17	1
National Party	2,783	46.44	5
Colorado-National United List	323	5.39	–
Total	5,993	100.00	6
Source: Bottinelli et al.
