= 1912 Uruguayan Senate election =

Senate elections were held in Uruguay on 24 November 1912 to elect six of the 19 members of the Senate.

== Results ==
Party	Votes	%	Seats
Colorado-National United List	3,737	68.23	–
Colorado Party	1,330	24.28	5
National Party	410	7.49	1
Total	5,477	100.00	6
Source: Bottinelli et al.
