= Facundo Pellistri =

Uruguayan footballer (born 2001)

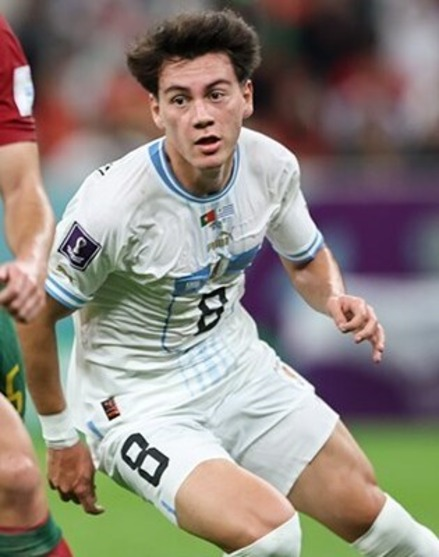
- Pellistri with Uruguay at the 2022 FIFA World Cup

Personal information
- Full name: Facundo Pellistri Rebollo
- Date of birth: 20 December 2001 (age 24)
- Place of birth: Montevideo, Uruguay
- Height: 1.75 m (5 ft 9 in)
- Position: Winger

Team information
- Current team: Panathinaikos
- Number: 28

Youth career
- La Picada
- River Plate Montevideo
- 2012–2019: Peñarol

Senior career*
Years	Team	Apps	(Gls)
2019–2020	Peñarol	30	(1)
2020–2024	Manchester United	13	(0)
2021	→ Alavés (loan)	12	(0)
2021–2022	→ Alavés (loan)	21	(0)
2024	→ Granada (loan)	15	(2)
2024–	Panathinaikos	34	(1)

International career^{‡}
2017	Uruguay U16	2	(0)
2022–	Uruguay	43	(2)
Medal record
Men's football
Representing Uruguay
Copa América
Third place	2024 United States
- * Club domestic league appearances and goals as of 23:22, 14 September 2026 (UTC) ‡ National team caps and goals as of 01:50, 18 November 2026 (UTC)

Facundo Pellistri Rebollo (Spanish pronunciation: [faˈkundo peˈlistɾi]; born 20 December 2001) is a Uruguayan professional footballer who plays as a winger for Greek Super League club Panathinaikos and the Uruguay national team.

Born in Montevideo, Pellistri is a graduate of Peñarol's youth system. He made 37 first-team appearances for the club and was named in the Uruguayan Primera División Team of the Season in 2019. He transferred to Manchester United in October 2020, for a fee of £9 million. After joining United, he had two loan spells at Spanish club Alavés, where he made 35 appearances in total, before a further loan spell at fellow La Liga side Granada in 2024. He joined Panathinaikos for a fee of around £5.1 million in August 2024.

Pellistri represented Uruguay at under-16 level, before making his senior international debut in January 2022. He played for Uruguay at the 2022 FIFA World Cup and the 2024 Copa América.

== Early life and education ==
Pellistri was born on 20 December 2001 in the capital city of Montevideo to a family of Spanish and Italian descent. His father, Marcelo, is an accountant and his mother, Lucía (née Rebollo), is a pediatrician. Along with his native Uruguayan passport, Pellistri also has a Spanish passport through his father's grandmother, a native of the municipality of A Coruña in Galicia. The lead singer of Uruguayan rock band La Vela Puerca, Sebastián Teysera, is Pellistri's godfather.

Pellistri was privately educated at two institutions in the Pocitos neighbourhood: St Brendan's School for his early years, where he first learned English, and then Ivy Thomas Memorial School for high school. His strongest subject at school was mathematics. In 2019, Pellistri graduated from a pre-architectural study program.

== Club career ==
=== Peñarol ===
Pellistri began his football career at the age of four at La Picada, a baby football club. Later, he had a brief stint with River Plate in AUFI; from 2012, he played in the youth divisions of Peñarol, a club he supports.

His first three years at Peñarol were in AUFI. In 2015, he began to be part of the club's youth teams, starting with the U-14. In the Juveniles, he played 115 matches and scored 49 goals. He was part of the U-14, U-15, U-16 and U-17 teams.

In 2017, Pellistri won his first Uruguayan championship, obtaining the title in U-16 after defeating Defensor Sporting 2-1 in the tournament final. That same year, he scored his first classic goal. The match corresponded to the 4th round of the Clausura Tournament, and near the end, he scored the goal that sealed the final result of the match (2-1). This match against Nacional was played at the Estadio Centenario, a national historic monument, marking his first official game at that venue.

In 2018, the year in which Facundo was part of the U-17 team, he was called up for the first time to train with the main squad of the carbonero, led by Diego López, to carry out the mid-year preseason in the department of Colonia. At that time, the player was 16 years old and experiencing his first involvement with the main squad.

In 2019, the player alternated between the main squad and the reserves, where he played 13 matches. Finally, on August 11, 2019, he made his first division debut. He came on in the 89th minute against Defensor Sporting at the Estadio Luis Franzini, during the fourth round of the Torneo Intermedio 2019. Although he had relatively few minutes on the field, in his first play, he managed to excite the fans. The match ended in a 2-2 draw.

From then on, Pellistri began to be more frequently considered for the main squad. On November 6, 2019, he scored his first official goal in the first division, in a 3-1 victory against Cerro during the 10th round of the Torneo Clausura 2019, held at the Estadio Luis Tróccoli. Since his debut, he started gaining more playing time and quickly ignited great excitement among Peñarol fans - to the point that, just a few months after his debut, he was selected through various social media platforms of the AUF as the public's player of the year 2019. He was also distinguished as a member of the ideal team of the 2019 Uruguayan Championship, having participated in only 50% of the year's matches.

But he didn't just excite and attract the interest of fans. Shortly after becoming a major revelation in the local scene, rumors began to surface from major global institutions. Boca Juniors, Atlético de Madrid, Arsenal, Barcelona, Real Madrid and Manchester City were some of the clubs that reportedly showed interest in the player. In December 2019, Juan Román Riquelme, vice president of Boca Juniors and former player of the club, publicly praised the player and stated that "there are not many players like him anymore".

In February 2020, his contract with Peñarol was renewed until 2022, which included a release clause of 15 million dollars, a historic and significant amount for the institution.

=== Manchester United ===
Pellistri joined Manchester United on 5 October 2020, for a reported transfer fee of £9 million, on a five-year contract. Diego Forlán, who was then managing Peñarol, endorsed Pellistri in a conversation with Manchester United manager and former teammate Ole Gunnar Solskjær, comparing the young player to Ryan Giggs and emphasizing his ability to speak English. His first pre-season goal was on 18 July 2021, against Derby County, in a 2–1 away win at Pride Park.

==== Loan to Alavés ====
On 31 January 2021, Pellistri joined Alavés on loan for the remainder of the season. He returned to United to play in their summer pre-season matches, before going back on loan to Alavés in August for the 2021–22 season.

==== 2022–23 season ====
Pellistri made his competitive debut for Manchester United on 10 January 2023, coming on as a substitute and assisting the second goal in a 3–0 EFL Cup win over Charlton Athletic. Pellistri made his Premier League debut on 8 February 2023, coming on as a substitute in a 2–2 draw against Leeds United. On 17 March 2023, Pellistri made his first senior start for United, against Real Betis in the UEFA Europa League. On 20 September 2023, Pellistri made his UEFA Champions League debut against Bayern Munich, in the group stage, at the Allianz Arena.

==== Loan to Granada ====
On 31 January 2024, Pellistri joined Granada on a loan deal until the end of the season. On 11 February, Pellistri netted his first goal for Granada in a La Liga game against Barcelona, which ended in a 3–3 stalemate.

=== Panathinaikos ===
On 21 August 2024, Pellistri signed for Super League Greece club Panathinaikos on a four-year deal. The fee was a reported €6 million (£5.1 million) with up to €2 million in performance based add-ons, with Manchester United also holding a 45% sell-on clause as well as a three-year buy-back option.

== International career ==
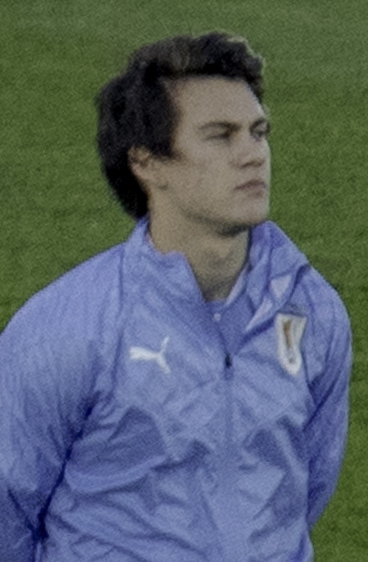
Pellistri lining up for Uruguay in 2022

Pellistri is a former Uruguayan youth international, having made two appearances at under-16 level in 2017. He was called up to the senior team for the first time on 7 January 2022, for the World Cup qualifying matches against Paraguay and Venezuela. He made his full international debut on 27 January, in a 1–0 away win against Paraguay.

Pellistri was included in the squad for the 2022 FIFA World Cup. He started and played for 88 minutes in Uruguay's first game of the tournament, against South Korea, before being replaced by Guillermo Varela. Pellistri scored his first international goal for Uruguay against Mexico in a friendly match on 5 June 2024 at Empower Field at Mile High in the United States. He also contributed an assist for Darwin Núñez in his hat-trick for a 4–0 win.

On 31 May 2026, Pellistri was named in Uruguay's 26-man squad for the 2026 FIFA World Cup.

== Style of play ==
A winger, Pellistri has been praised highly for his agility, versatility, dribbling skills, technique, and strategic vision on the field. He has received praise from world-class footballers such as Diego Forlan and Juan Román Riquelme.

== Career statistics ==
=== Club ===
As of match played 28 October 2026

Appearances and goals by club, season and competition
Club	Season	League			National cup (Note: Includes FA Cup, Copa del Rey, Greek Cup)		League cup (Note: Includes EFL Cup)		Continental		Other		Total	
Club	Season	Division	Apps	Goals	Apps	Goals	Apps	Goals	Apps	Goals	Apps	Goals	Apps	Goals
Peñarol	2019	Uruguayan Primera División	18	1	—		—		0	0	2 (Note: One appearance in Torneo Clausura decider, one appearance in championship play-off)	0	20	1
Peñarol	2020	Uruguayan Primera División	12	0	—		—		5 (Note: Appearances in Copa Libertadores)	1	—		17	1
Peñarol	Total		30	1	—		—		5	1	2	0	37	2
Manchester United U21	2020–21	—			—		—		—		2 (Note: Appearance(s) in EFL Trophy)	1	2	1
Manchester United U21	2022–23	—			—		—		—		1	0	1	0
Manchester United U21	Total		—		—		—		—		3	1	3	1
Manchester United	2022–23	Premier League	4	0	1	0	2	0	3 (Note: Appearances in UEFA Europa League)	0	—		10	0
Manchester United	2023–24	Premier League	9	0	1	0	1	0	3 (Note: Appearances in UEFA Champions League)	0	—		14	0
Manchester United	2024–25	Premier League	0	0	—		—		—		1 (Note: Appearance in FA Community Shield)	0	1	0
Manchester United	Total		13	0	2	0	3	0	6	0	1	0	25	0
Alavés (loan)	2020–21	La Liga	12	0	0	0	—		—		—		12	0
Alavés (loan)	2021–22	La Liga	21	0	2	0	—		—		—		23	0
Alavés (loan)	Total		33	0	2	0	—		—		—		35	0
Granada (loan)	2023–24	La Liga	15	2	—		—		—		—		15	2
Panathinaikos	2024–25	Super League Greece	24	1	4	1	—		7 (Note: Appearances in UEFA Conference League)	2	—		35	4
Panathinaikos	2025–26	Super League Greece	8	0	0	0	—		10 (Note: Two appearances in UEFA Champions League, eight appearances in UEFA Europa League)	0	—		18	0
Panathinaikos	2026-27	Super League Greece	2	0	3	0	—		6	0	—		11	0
Panathinaikos	Total		34	1	7	1	—		23	2	—		64	4
Career total			125	4	11	1	3	0	34	3	6	1	179	9

=== International ===
As of match played 17 November 2026

Appearances and goals by national team and year
National team	Year	Apps	Goals
Uruguay	2022	10	0
Uruguay	2023	8	0
Uruguay	2024	14	2
Uruguay	2025	5	0
Uruguay	2026	6	0
Total		43	2

Scores and results list Uruguay's goal tally first, score column indicates score after each Pellistri goal.

List of international goals scored by Facundo Pellistri
No.	Date	Venue	Opponent	Score	Result	Competition	Ref.
1	5 June 2024	Empower Field at Mile High, Denver, United States	Mexico	2–0	4–0	Friendly	
2	27 June 2024	MetLife Stadium, East Rutherford, United States	Bolivia	1–0	5–0	2024 Copa América	

== Honours ==
Manchester United

- FA Cup runner-up: 2022–23
- EFL Cup: 2022–23

Uruguay

- Copa América third place: 2024

Individual

- Uruguayan Primera División Team of the Year: 2019
