= Andrew Teuten =

Uruguayan footballer (born 1998)

Personal information
- Full name: Andrew Christopher Teuten Ponzoni
- Date of birth: 20 July 1998 (age 28)
- Place of birth: Montevideo, Uruguay
- Height: 1.73 m (5 ft 8 in)
- Position: Left-back

Team information
- Current team: Paysandú
- Number: 24

Youth career
- Old Ivy
- Defensor Sporting
- CA Torque

Senior career*
Years	Team	Apps	(Gls)
2018–2021	Montevideo City	101	(6)
2022–2024	Colón	31	(1)
2023–2024	→ Montevideo City (loan)	22	(1)
2025	Montevideo Wanderers	32	(0)
2026–	Paysandú	5	(0)

International career^{‡}
2024–	Uruguay A'	1	(0)
- * Club domestic league appearances and goals as of 21 June 2026 ‡ National team caps and goals as of 31 May 2024

Andrew Christopher Teuten Ponzoni (born 20 July 1998) is a Uruguayan professional footballer who plays as a left-back for Uruguayan Segunda División club Paysandú.

== Early life ==
Teuten was born to an English father and an Uruguayan mother. He grew up in Montevideo and attended Ivy Thomas Memorial School in barrio Pocitos.

== Club career ==
After playing in the Uruguayan university league, Teuten signed for City Football Group owned club Montevideo City Torque in 2018. He made his professional debut on 28 March 2018 in a 1–1 draw against Boston River.

On 2 February 2022, Teuten was sold to Argentine Primera División club Colón for a fee around €445.000, signing a deal until the end of 2024. On 17 August 2023, he moved to his former club Montevideo City on loan until the end of June 2024.

== International career ==
In May 2024, Teuten was named in the first ever Uruguay A' national team squad. He made his Uruguay A' debut on 31 May 2024 in a goalless draw against Costa Rica.

== Career statistics ==
=== Club ===
As of 22 November 2021

Club	Season	League			Cup		Continental		Other		Total	
Club	Season	Division	Apps	Goals	Apps	Goals	Apps	Goals	Apps	Goals	Apps	Goals
Montevideo City Torque	2018	Primera División	26	0	—		—		1 (Note: Appearance in Torneo Intermedio final.)	0	27	0
Montevideo City Torque	2019	Segunda División	22	0	—		—		—		22	0
Montevideo City Torque	2020	Primera División	24	1	—		—		—		24	1
Montevideo City Torque	2021	Primera División	26	5	–		7 (Note: Appearances in Copa Sudamericana.)	1	–		33	6
Career total			98	6	0	0	7	1	1	0	106	7

== Honours ==
Montevideo City Torque

- Uruguayan Segunda División: 2019
