= Lucas Bianchi =

Uruguayan rugby union player

- Full name: Lucas Bianchi Bonfiglio
- Born: 26 March 2001 (age 25)
- Height: 190 cm (6 ft 3 in)
- Weight: 107 kg (236 lb; 16 st 12 lb)
- School: Ivy Thomas Memorial School

Rugby union career
- Position: Blindside Flanker
Senior career
Years	Team	Apps	(Points)
- Peñarol
International career
Years	Team	Apps	(Points)
2022–	Uruguay	11	(5)

Lucas Bianchi Bonfiglio (Note: In this Spanish name, the first or paternal surname is Bianchi and the second or maternal family name is Bonfiglio.) (born 26 March 2001) is a Uruguayan rugby union player, currently playing for Súper Liga Americana de Rugby side Peñarol.

== Career ==
Bianchi, a flanker, made his international debut against Japan in 2022. He was named to the Uruguay squad for the 2023 Rugby World Cup.
