= Macarena Rubio =

Uruguayan politician

Macarena Rubio is a Uruguayan politician and lawyer, president of the National Party since 2024.

== Political offices ==
The Board of the National Party of Uruguay announced on 27 May 2024 the appointment of Macarena Rubio as new president, after Pablo Iturralde left this post following a series of chats. She was previously Executive Secretary of the Congress of Mayors.
