= Partido de la Gente =

Political party in Uruguay

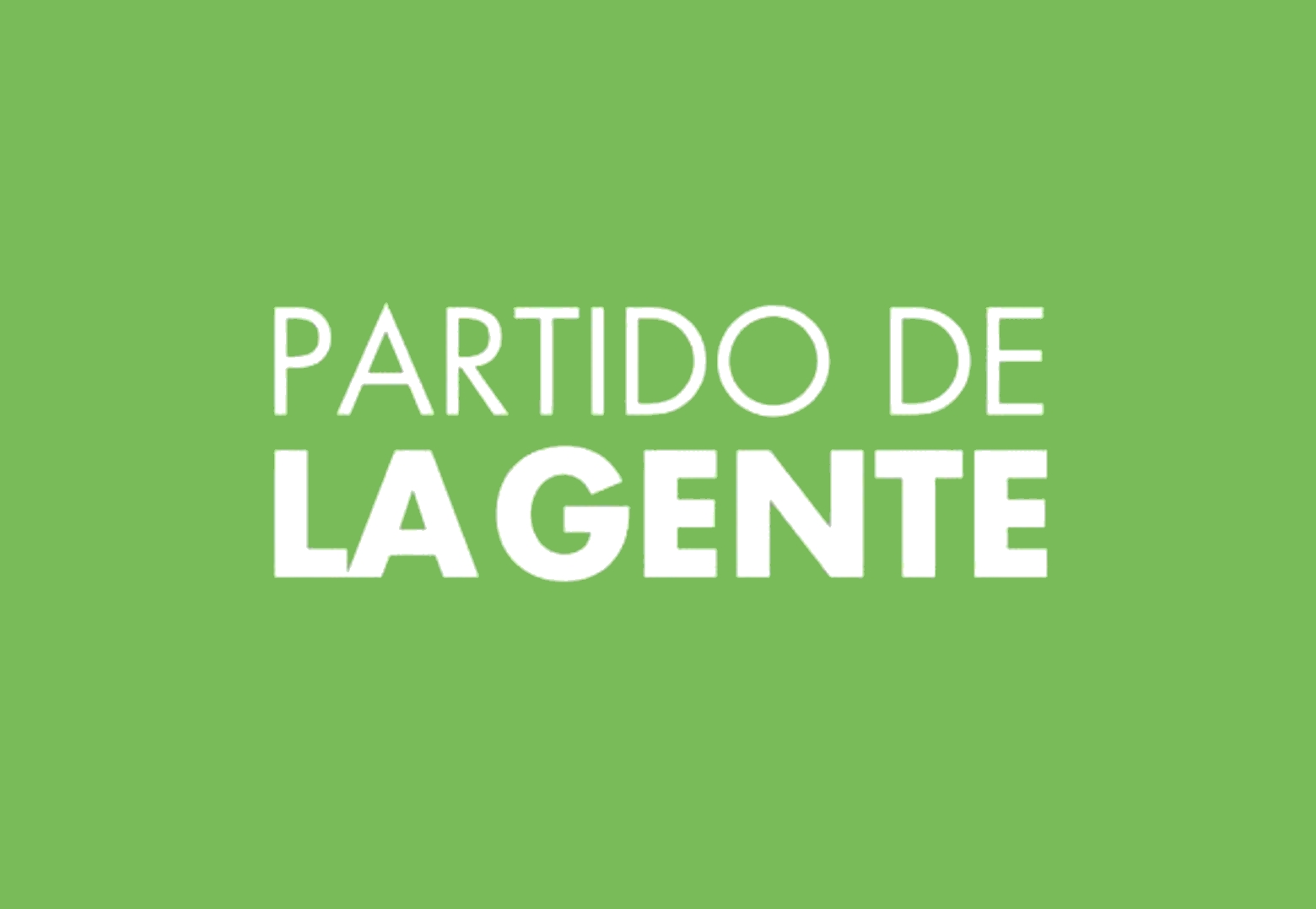
- Leader: Edgardo Novick
- Founded: 7 November 2016; 8 years ago
- Ideology: Conservatism; Economic liberalism
- Political position: Centre-right to right-wing
- National affiliation: Multicolor Coalition
- Chamber of Senators: 0 / 30
- Chamber of Deputies: 0 / 99
- Intendencias: 0 / 19
- Mayors: 0 / 112

Website
- www.novick.com.uy

Partido de la Gente (Spanish for "Party of the Folk" or "Party of the People") was a Uruguayan political party.

== History ==
Founded in 2016, its main leader was Edgardo Novick.

Three members of the party were elected to the legislature: the Senator Daniel Bianchi and the Representative Guillermo Facello, both former Colorados; and the Representative Daniel Peña, a former Blanco. However, in early 2019 Bianchi was expelled from the party after driving under the influence of alcohol.

== Name ==
Gente is a Spanish-language word for "people" or "populace". There is also another synonym, pueblo. Locally, the word pueblo may have a left-leaning or revolutionary connotation, as used by other political groups such as Partido por el Gobierno del Pueblo and Partido por la Victoria del Pueblo. As such, the name of the party used a more neutral term without the connotation, while still maintaining a similar translation as the "Party of the Folk", or "Party of the Plain Folks", as well as "Party of the People".

== Electoral history ==
=== Presidential elections ===
Election	Party candidate	Running mate	Votes	%	Votes	%	Result
Election	Party candidate	Running mate	First Round		Second Round		Result
2019	Edgardo Novick	Daniel Peña	26,313	1.12%	-	-	Lost ✗

=== Chamber of Deputies and Senate elections ===
Election	Votes	%	Chamber seats	+/-	Position	Senate seats	+/-	Position	Size
2019	26,313	1.12%	1 / 99	▲1	6th	0 / 30	Steady	Coalition (PN–PC–CA–PG–PI)	6th
