= 2019 Uruguayan presidential primaries =

Presidential primary elections were held in Uruguay on 30 June 2019 in order to nominate the presidential candidate for every political party taking part in the 2019 Uruguayan general election.

== Background ==
The formally called elecciones internas (Spanish for 'Internal elections') are the first stage of the electoral system established by the Constitution of 1997. In this election, the only candidates for President of Uruguay per party for the general election will be elected. In addition, the integration of the National Deliberative Body and the different Departmental Deliberative Bodies of the different parties, which have the function of nominating the candidate for president and vice president of each party, and the candidates for mayors for the municipal elections of 2020 are also elected.

In accordance with the transitory provisions of the Constitution, the primary electionsare held on the last Sunday of June of the electoral year, and those "qualified to vote"—all those over 18 years of age and registered in the Civic Registry and with a civic credential―can participate in the secret and non-compulsory suffrage.

In order to win the primary election and be proclaimed a presidential candidate, the pre-candidate must obtain an absolute majority of the party's valid votes. In the event that no pre-candidate obtains that majority, the winner will be the one that exceeds 40% of the votes and leads the second by no less than 10 percentage points. If none of these circumstances occur, the deliberative body elected in the election will nominate the party's candidate for president by an absolute majority of its members.

The participation of the parties in the elections is mandatory. In addition, each one had to obtain at least 500 votes to participate in the general elections.

== Broad Front ==
The Broad Front is the party of incumbent president Tabaré Vázquez, which was unable to seek reelection due to constitutional term limits, so it had to pick a new presidential nominee. This primary was also considered a generation change of the Broad Front, due to the lack of presence of historically dominant names such as Tabaré Vázquez, José Mujica and Danilo Astori.

=== Candidates ===
Party	Candidate	Ideology
Socialist Party of Uruguay	Daniel Martínez	Social democracy
Movement of Popular Participation	Carolina Cosse	Marxism; Progressivism
Communist Party of Uruguay	Oscar Andrade	Communism; Marxism–Leninism
Liber Seregni Front	Mario Bergara	Social democracy Christian democracy

=== Results ===
During non-mandatory primary voting on June 30, 2019 Daniel Martinez, the former Intendant of Montevideo, won his party's endorsement.

Party	Presidential candidate	Votes	%
Socialist Party of Uruguay	Daniel Martínez	108,943	42.04
Movement of Popular Participation	Carolina Cosse	65,914	25.43
Communist Party of Uruguay	Oscar Andrade	59,646	23.02
Liber Seregni Front	Mario Bergara	24,119	9.31

== National Party ==
The National Party has been the main opposition party since the 2004 election. Its nomination is contested by the following candidates:

- Senator Jorge Larrañaga
- Intendant of Maldonado Enrique Antía
- Businessman Juan Sartori
- Senator Luis Alberto Lacalle Pou
- Deputy Representative Carlos Iafigliola

During non-mandatory primary voting on June 30, 2019 Luis Alberto Lacalle Pou, the son of the former President of Uruguay Luis Alberto Lacalle, won his party's endorsement. Multimillionaire, Juan Sartori, came in a distant second place.

== Colorado Party ==
The Colorado Party nomination is contested by the following candidates:

- Senator José Amorín Batlle
- Pedro Etchegaray
- Edgardo Martínez Zimarioff
- Former President of the Republic Julio María Sanguinetti
- Economist Ernesto Talvi

During non-mandatory primary voting on June 30, 2019 Ernesto Talvi, an economist and relative newcomer to politics, won his party's endorsement by beating the two-time former president Julio María Sanguinetti.

== See also ==
- 2019 Uruguayan general election

== Bibliography ==
- Fernández, Nelson (2019). A boca de urna. ¿Quién ganará las elecciones 2019?. Editorial Fin de Siglo. ISBN 9789974499652.
