= Digital Party =

Uruguayan political party

Digital Party Partido Digital
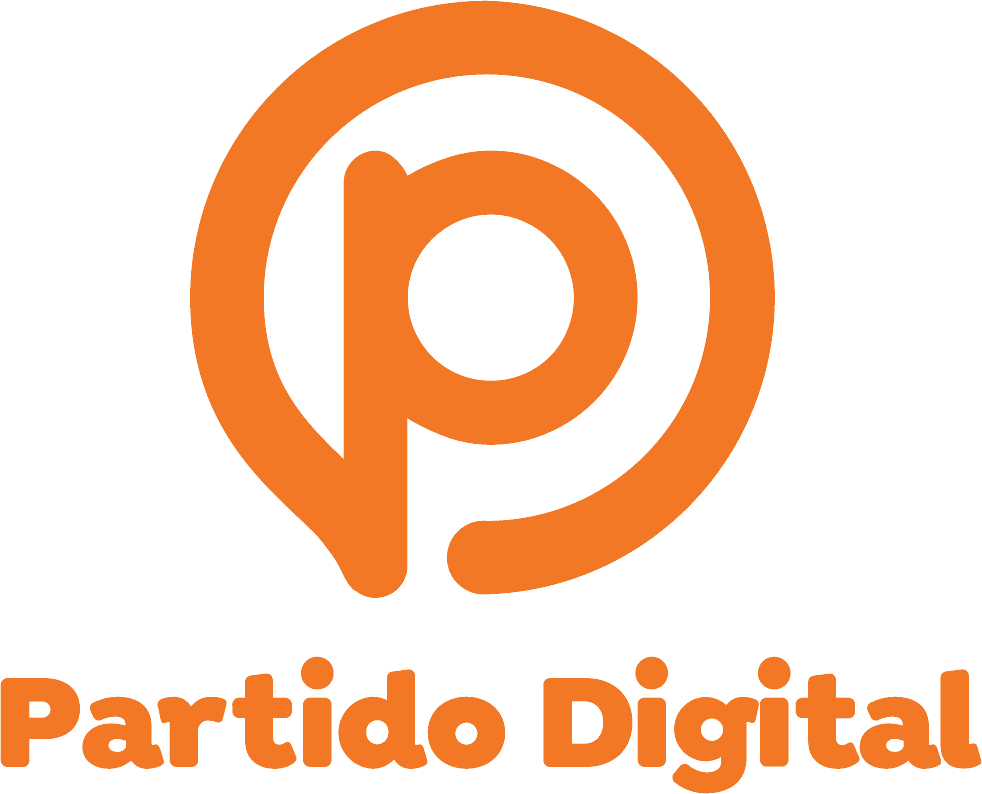
- Leader: Daniel Goldman
- President: Alejandro Ferrer
- Founded: 2013
- Legalized: 2018
- Ideology: E-democracy

Website
- https://partidodigital.org.uy/

The Digital Party (Spanish: Partido Digital) is a Uruguayan political party.

Founded in 2013 and registered in 2018, they advocate for political transparency and direct engagement of the citizens via social networks and other e-democracy tools. Other than this, the party has no consistent other ideology, as official policy positions are voted on by party members online.

They took part in the 2019 Uruguayan general election, with their leader Daniel Goldman running as their presidential candidate.

== Electoral history ==
=== Presidential elections ===
Election	Party candidate	Running mate	Votes	%	Votes	%	Result
Election	Party candidate	Running mate	First Round		Second Round		Result
2019	Daniel Goldman	Diego Ruete	6,363	0.27%	-	-	Lost ✗

=== Chamber of Deputies and Senate elections ===
Election	Votes	%	Chamber seats	+/-	Position	Senate seats	+/-	Position
2019	6,363	0.27%	0 / 99	Steady	10th	0 / 30	Steady	10th
