= Guido Manini Ríos =

Uruguayan politician

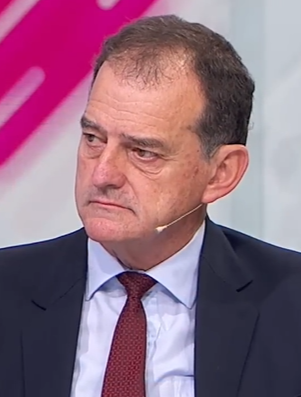

Senator of Uruguay
- In office 15 February 2020 – 15 February 2025

Commander-in-Chief of the Uruguayan Army
- In office 1 February 2015 – 12 March 2019
- Preceded by: Juan Villagrán
- Succeeded by: José A. González

Personal details
- Born: Guido Manini Ríos Stratta; 8 December 1958 (age 67) Montevideo, Uruguay
- Party: Open Cabildo
- Spouse: Irene Moreira (m. 1986)
- Education: Universidad Católica del Uruguay
- Occupation: Politician
- Profession: Military

Military service
- Rank: General officer

Guido Manini Ríos Stratta (born 8 December 1958) is an Uruguayan politician and retired general officer who served as Commander-in-Chief of the National Army, serving in this post from 1 February 2015 until being sacked by the president on 12 March 2019.

In 2019, he joined the newly founded Open Cabildo party. He ran for president and Senator in the 2019 Uruguayan general election.

== Family and education ==
Manini is a grandson of Colorado politician Pedro Manini Ríos who was a senator, a diputate and Minister of the Interior. He is Catholic and has Italian origins.

He attended his primary and secondary studies at the Lycée Français de Montevideo. In 1973 he enrolled in the Liceo Militar General Artigas and two years later he entered the Military School. He also has a degree in history from the Catholic University.

== Military career ==
He served on official missions in Iran and Iraq between 1988 and 1989 as a member of the United Nations Military Observer Group (UNIIMOG). Between 1993 and 1994 he joined an observation group in Mozambique. The next year he was conferred the degree of major.

In 1996 he joined a delegation of the Military Institute of Advanced Studies (IMES) where he received instruction in the United States, he returned in 2010, as a Military Attaché attached to the Uruguayan Embassy in that country and as an Advisor to the Inter-American College defense.

He received the rank of lieutenant colonel and colonel in 1999 and 2003 respectively and was promoted to general in 2011.

=== Commander-in-Chief of the Uruguayan Army ===
In February 2015 he was promoted to the position of commander-in-chief of the army. In September 2018, he was punished for public statements in which he criticized the approval of a reform of the pension system of the military. This sanction was the toughest imposed on a general since the end of the dictatorship in 1985.

In March 2019, the decision of the court of honor created in the armed forces to analyze the human rights violations of retired military personnel Jorge "Pajarito" Silveira Quesada, José Nino Gavazzo and Luis Alfredo Maurente Mata committed during the dictatorship was made public. As a result, Manini criticized the Uruguayan court. This was the reason why President Tabaré Vázquez decided to dismiss him.

== Political career ==
In April 2019, he was announced as running for president by the Open Cabildo party. In the 2019 presidential primaries, Manini obtained 49,485 votes, being the fourth most voted political force. In the October general election he won a seat in the Senate. He obtained 268.736 votes, 11,04 %.

He assumed as Senator on February 15, 2020, at the beginning of the XLIX Legislature.

== Awards ==
- Order of Aeronautical Merit (Brazil)
