= Cabildo Abierto =

Political party in Uruguay

- Leader: Guido Manini Ríos
- Chairman: Raúl Lozano Bonet
- Founded: 10 March 2019; 7 years ago
- Headquarters: Montevideo
- Ideology: National conservatism; Right-wing populism; Militarism; Economic interventionism
- Political position: Far-right
- National affiliation: Republican Coalition
- Colors: Yellow; Maroon
- Chamber of Deputies: 2 / 99
- Senate: 0 / 30
- Intendencias: 0 / 19
- Mayors: 0 / 112

Party flag

Website
- cabildoabierto.uy
- Politics of Uruguay; Political parties; Elections; A: The party has also been referred to having some neo-fascist ideologies such as the third position by some sources.

Cabildo Abierto is an Uruguayan political party founded in 2019. The party is described as right-wing populist, nationalist and conservative, as well as mostly characterized as far-right on the political spectrum. However, it defines itself as Artiguist and is referred to as a third position party by some sources. It participated for the first time in an election the same year of its foundation, obtaining 11.04% of the votes, three senators and eleven representatives. It is led by Guido Manini Ríos, descendant of a traditional Colorado Party family and former Commander in Chief of the Army.

According to "Cifra", a consultancy firm, in October 2019, 24% of its voters were previously from the Broad Front, 14% from the Colorado Party and 10% from the National Party. Gonzalo Ferreira Sienra, one of the children of Wilson Ferreira Aldunate, is a member of Cabildo Abierto.

== History ==
This political group applied to the Electoral Court in early 2019 to request its registration as a party, to compete in the presidential primaries of that year. The request was approved on March 10, after the acceptance of some 3,000 signatures submitted by citizens. The current name refers to the old town hall meetings of the colonial era, which in modern usage has been transferred to holding open meetings in order to make decisions.

It is chaired by lawyer and notary Guillermo Domenech, a former member of the National Party who served as a Notary of the President's Office from 1990 to 2019. Manini Ríos's wife, Irene Moreira, who also belonged to the National Party, resigned from it and joined Cabildo Abierto.

=== 2019 election ===
In the June 2019 presidential primaries, Cabildo Abierto had had more than 40,000 votes across the country, making it the fourth Uruguayan political force. The departments with the most votes for this party were Rivera, Cerro Largo and Artigas.

In mid-August, Manini Ríos confirmed the party's president, Guillermo Domenech, as his running mate for the general election. In the general election, Open Cabildo obtained 268,736 votes (11.46%) and won three seats in the Senate and 11 in the Chamber of Representatives. In the face of the second round (ballotage), Open Cabildo was part of the Coalición Multicolor, which supported Luis Lacalle Pou and which was also composed of the National Party (PN), Colorado Party (PN), Independent Party (PI) and the Party of the People (PG).

== Ideology ==
Cabildo Abierto has shown an emphasis on economic interventionism, nationalism, public security and social conservatism. This sets them apart from traditional Uruguayan centre and right-wing parties like the Colorado and National parties, more involved in economic liberalism. Their presidential candidate was Guido Manini Ríos, an army general under President Tabaré Vázquez that opposed left-wing judicial activism aimed at prosecuting members of the armed forces on human rights charges.

El País from Madrid analyse this phenomenon as a sign of the rise of the populist right in the mold of Donald Trump and Brexit in a traditionally centrist country.

== Election results ==
=== Presidential elections ===
Election	Party candidate	Running mate	Votes	%	Votes	%	Result
Election	Party candidate	Running mate	First Round		Second Round		Result
2019	Guido Manini Ríos	Guillermo Domenech	268,736	11.46%			Lost ✗
2024	Guido Manini Ríos	Lorena Quintana	60,549	2.61%			Lost ✗

=== Chamber of Deputies and Senate elections ===
Election	Votes	%	Chamber seats	+/-	Position	Senate seats	+/-	Position	Size
2019	268,736	11.46%	11 / 99	New	4th	3 / 30	New	Coalition (PN–PC–CA–PG–PI)	4th
2024	60,549	2.61%	2 / 99	▼9	5th	0 / 30	▼3		5th
