= 2019 Uruguayan general election =

- 27 October 2019; 24 November 2019 (runoff)
- Registered: 2,669,980
- Turnout: 90.13% (first round) ▼0.38pp 90.12% (second round) ▲1.54pp
- Presidential election
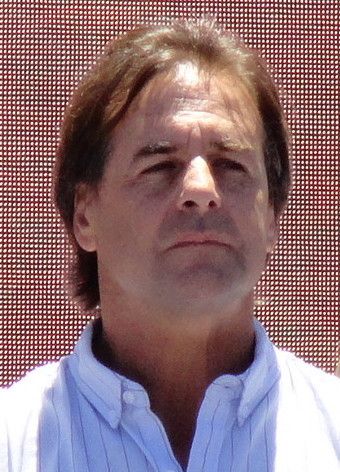

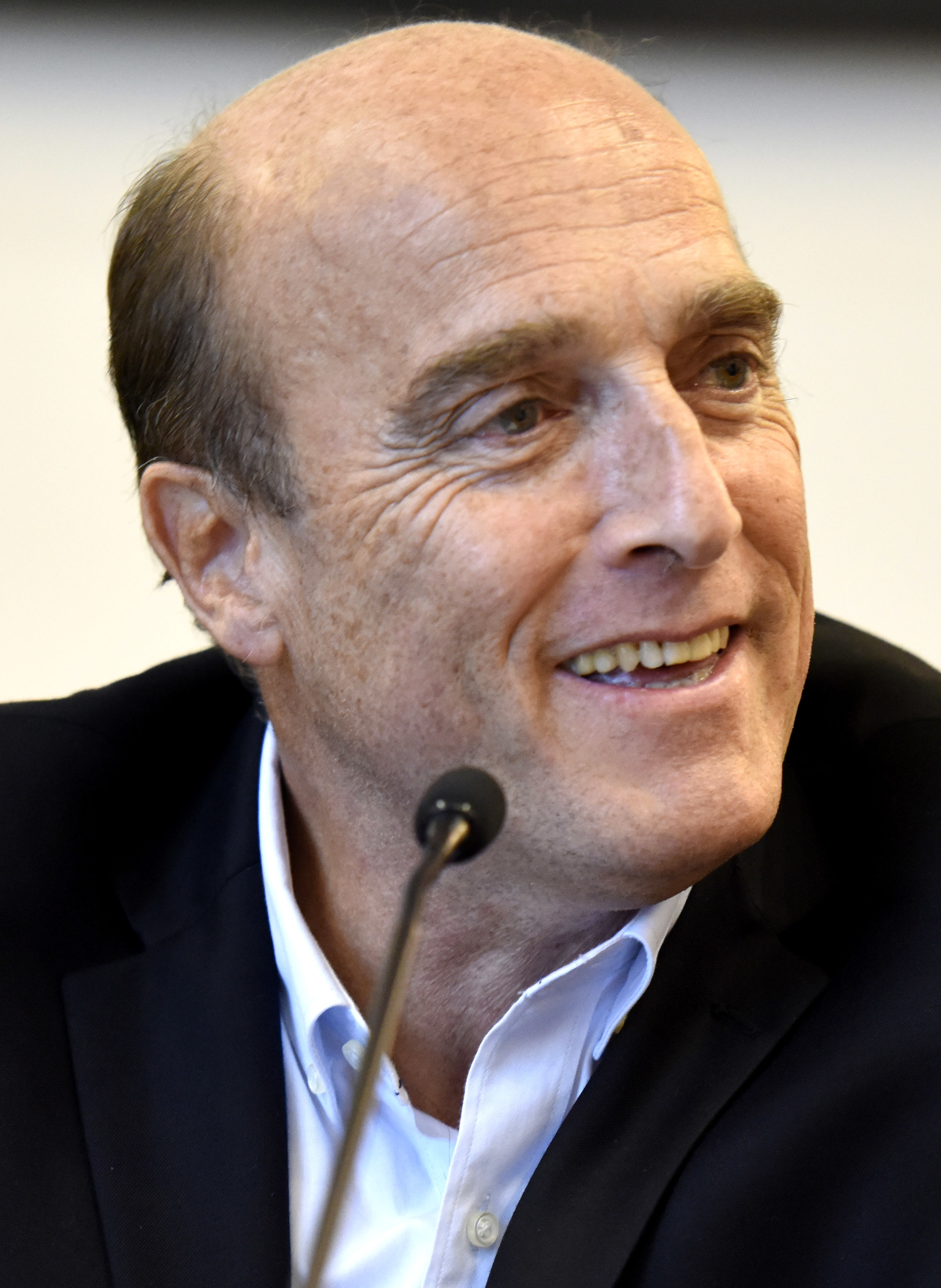
Nominee	Luis Lacalle Pou	Daniel Martínez
Party	National	Socialist
Alliance	Multicolor Coalition	Broad Front
Running mate	Beatriz Argimón	Graciela Villar
Popular vote	1,189,313	1,152,271
Percentage	50.79%	49.21%
- Results by department
President before election
Tabaré Vázquez
Broad Front
Elected President
Luis Lacalle Pou
National
- Parliamentary election
- All 99 seats in the Chamber of Representatives; All 30 seats in the Senate
Party	Leader	Vote %	Seats	+/–
Chamber of Representatives
Broad Front	Daniel Martínez	40.49	42	−8
National	Luis Lacalle Pou	29.70	30	−2
Colorado	Ernesto Talvi	12.80	13	0
Cabildo Abierto	Guido Manini Ríos	11.46	11	New
PERI	César Vega	1.43	1	+1
Partido de la Gente	Edgardo Novick	1.12	1	New
Independent	Pablo Mieres	1.01	1	−2
Senate
Broad Front	Daniel Martínez	40.49	13	−2
National	Luis Lacalle Pou	29.70	10	0
Colorado	Ernesto Talvi	12.80	4	0
Cabildo Abierto	Guido Manini Ríos	11.46	3	New
This lists parties that won seats. See the complete results below.

General elections were held in Uruguay on Sunday, 27 October 2019 to elect the President and General Assembly. As no presidential candidate received a majority in the first round of voting, a runoff election took place on 24 November.

In the 2014 elections, the left-wing Broad Front had won a third consecutive election with absolute majorities in both houses of the General Assembly. The Broad Front's term in office еarned support through the creation of a large welfare system, but at the same time was undermined by an increasing budget deficit, along with rising unemployment and a spike in violence. The election campaign focused primarily around the issue of crime, with each party proposing different solutions. A constitutional referendum on amendments proposed by opposition senator Jorge Larrañaga was held alongside the elections. The amendments proposed the introduction of a National Guard and tougher security measures.

As incumbent president Tabaré Vázquez was unable to seek re-election due to constitutional term limits, the Broad Front nominated former Montevideo mayor Daniel Martínez as its presidential candidate. The National Party nominated its 2014 candidate Luis Lacalle Pou, the Colorado Party nominated the economist Ernesto Talvi, and the new Open Cabildo party nominated former commander-in-chief of the Uruguayan Army, Guido Manini Ríos.

Heading into the elections, most opinion polls predicted a run-off between Martínez and Lacalle Pou, along with the loss of the Broad Front's congressional majority and the growth of Open Cabildo. In the first round of voting, the Broad Front saw its worst results since the 1999 elections, but Martínez still received the most votes in the 11-candidate field and qualified for the runoff along with Lacalle Pou, who subsequently received support from most of the eliminated opposition parties. In the runoff, Lacalle Pou defeated Martínez by just over 37,000 votes in a tight race, with the final result only declared after the counting of absentee ballots. Martinez conceded defeat four days after the election, saying that the outstanding absentee ballots would not be enough to overcome Lacalle Pou's lead in preliminary results.

The elections marked the first loss for the Broad Front in a presidential election since 1999, with Lacalle Pou becoming the first National Party president since his father, Luis Alberto Lacalle de Herrera, who held office from 1990 to 1995.

== Background ==
The 2014 elections had resulted in a third consecutive victory for the Broad Front. Former president Tabaré Vázquez was returned to office for a second non-consecutive term, having previously served as president from 2004 to 2009. The Broad Front also won an absolute majority in the General Assembly. Vázquez was ineligible to run again due to constitutional term limits. As a result, the governing Broad Front had to nominate a new candidate.

The economy had seen continued growth since 2003, allowing the government to invest heavily in social programs, pensions and health care. However, improved poverty and inequality ratios came at the cost of a budget deficit that reached 4.8 percent of GDP by the end of August 2019. According to political analysts, the Broad Front was predicted to lose its congressional majority, which combined with an increase in the number of parties expected to win seats in Congress, would make coalition negotiations difficult.

== Electoral system ==
The elections were held using the double simultaneous vote method, whereby voters cast a single vote for the party of their choice for all three of the Presidency, the Senate and the Chamber of Representatives.

The President of Uruguay was elected using the two-round system, with a run-off held when no candidate received 50% of the vote in the first round. The 30 members of the Senate were elected by proportional representation in a single nationwide constituency. The vice president, elected on the same ballot as the president, becomes president of the Senate, with their vote being the casting one when Senate votes are tied. The 99 members of the Chamber of Representatives were elected by closed list proportional representation in 19 multi-member constituencies based on the departments. Seats were allocated using the highest averages method.

== Presidential candidates ==
Presidential primaries were held on 30 June to select the candidates:

Party	Candidate	Ideology	Previous result	
Party	Candidate	Ideology	Votes (%)	Seats
Broad Front	Daniel Martínez	Social democracy Democratic socialism	47.81%	50 / 99 15 / 30
National Party	Luis Lacalle Pou	Conservatism; Christian democracy	30.88%	32 / 99 10 / 30
Colorado Party	Ernesto Talvi	Liberalism	12.89%	13 / 99 4 / 30
Independent Party	Pablo Mieres	Christian humanism Christian democracy	3.09%	3 / 99 1 / 30
Popular Unity	Gonzalo Abella	Marxism	1.13%	1 / 99 0 / 30
Partido Ecologista Radical Intransigente	César Vega	Green liberalism	0.75%	0 / 99 0 / 30
Workers' Party	Rafael Fernández	Trotskyism	0.14%	0 / 99 0 / 30
Party of the Folk	Edgardo Novick	Conservative liberalism Neoliberalism	Did not contest	
Green Animalist Party	Gustavo Salle	Green politics	Did not contest	
Digital Party	Daniel Goldman	E-democracy	Did not contest	
Open Cabildo	Guido Manini Ríos	Right-wing populism National conservatism	Did not contest	

== Campaign slogans ==
Candidate	Party	Original slogan	English translation	Ref
Daniel Martínez	Broad Front	No perder lo Bueno, hacerlo mejor	"Don't lose what is good, improve it"	
Luis Lacalle Pou	National Party	Lo que nos une	"What unites us"	
Ernesto Talvi	Colorado Party	Un pequeño país modelo	"A small model country"	
Edgardo Novick	Party of the Folk	Tolerancia Cero	"Zero Tolerance"	

== Opinion polls ==
Polling firm	Fieldwork date	FA	PN	PC	CA	PG	PI	Others	Blank/Abs.	Undecided	Lead
Opción Consultores	October 2019	33%	25%	10%	12%	—N/a	1%	—N/a	—N/a	—N/a	8%
Radar	October 2019	39%	21%	16%	12%	0.8%	1.1%	—N/a	—N/a	—N/a	8%
Opción Consultores	September 2019	29%	24%	15%	12%	2%	2%	—N/a	—N/a	—N/a	8%
Factum	August 2019	37%	26%	19%	9%	2%	2%	18%	—N/a	—N/a	7%
Cifra	February 2019	34%	27%	14%	3%	2%	-	2%	18%	-	7%
Factum	February 2019	38%	30%	16%	5%	4%	2%	—N/a	5%	—N/a	8%
Radar	January/February 2019	37%	28%	13%	3%	2%	1%	2%	7%	7%	9%
Radar	December 2018	33%	27%	12%	4%	3%	1%	—N/a	9%	9%	6%
Opción Consultores	December 2018	26%	27%	12%	5%	5%	2%.	—N/a	11%	12%	1%
Equipos	December 2018	30%	34%	11%	1%	2%	1%	1%	7%	13%	4%
Factum	November 2018	34%	30%	16%	7%	6%	2%	—N/a	5%	—N/a	4%
Radar	November 2018	32%	26%	13%	4%	3%	—N/a	2%	10%	10%	6%
Cifra	October 2018	36%	31%	9%	5%	6%	3%	—N/a	10%	—N/a	5%
Factum	August 2018	34%	30%	12%	7%	6%	2%	—N/a	9%	—N/a	4%
Radar	August 2018	30%	30%	8%	6%	2%	3%	—N/a	11%	10%	–
Cifra	August 2018	27%	26%	4%	3%	4%	1%	—N/a	35%		1%
Opción Consultores	July 2018	28%	31%	9%	8%	4%	2%	—N/a	8%	10%	3%
Radar	February 2018	33%	28%	7%	2%	2%	—N/a	3%	11%	13%	5%
Factum	April 2017	31%	30%	6%	9%	4%	2%	—N/a	18%	—N/a	1%

== Results ==
On 25 November, preliminary results in the runoff election showed Lacalle Pou narrowly ahead by 28,666 votes over Martínez, which delayed the announcement of a winner as 35,229 absentee vote needed to be counted. However, on 28 November, while these ballots were still being counted, Martínez conceded the race after concluding that they would not reverse Lacalle Pou's preliminary lead. On 30 November, final votes counts confirmed Lacalle Pou as the winner over Martínez.

Map of the legislative results

Party	Presidential candidate	First round		Second round		Seats			
Party	Presidential candidate	Votes	%	Votes	%	Chamber	+/–	Senate	+/–
Broad Front	Daniel Martínez	949,376	40.49	1,152,271	49.21	42	–8	13	–2
National Party	Luis Alberto Lacalle Pou	696,452	29.70	1,189,313	50.79	30	–2	10	0
Colorado Party	Ernesto Talvi	300,177	12.80			13	0	4	0
Open Cabildo	Guido Manini Ríos	268,736	11.46			11	New	3	New
Partido Ecologista Radical Intransigente	César Vega	33,461	1.43			1	+1	0	0
Partido de la Gente	Edgardo Novick	26,313	1.12			1	+1	0	0
Independent Party	Pablo Mieres	23,580	1.01			1	–2	0	–1
Popular Unity	Gonzalo Abella	19,728	0.84			0	–1	0	0
Green Animalist Party	Gustavo Salle	19,392	0.83			0	New	0	New
Digital Party	Daniel Goldman	6,363	0.27			0	New	0	New
Workers' Party	Rafael Fernández Rodríguez	1,387	0.06			0	0	0	0
Total		2,344,965	100.00	2,341,584	100.00	99	0	30	0
Valid votes		2,344,965	96.37	2,341,584	96.23				
Invalid votes		44,802	1.84	53,588	2.20				
Blank votes		43,597	1.79	38,024	1.56				
Total votes		2,433,364	100.00	2,433,196	100.00				
Registered voters/turnout		2,699,978	90.13	2,699,980	90.12				
Source: Corte Electoral (first round); Corte Electoral (second round)

=== By department ===
First round & parliamentary election
Constituency	Broad Front			National Party			Colorado Party			Open Cabildo			PERI			Party of the Folk			Independent Party			Others (Note: Parties which gained no parliamentary representation: Popular Unity, Green Animalist Party, Digital Party, Workers' Party.)		Valid votes		Invalid votes	
Constituency	Votes	%	D	Votes	%	D	Votes	%	D	Votes	%	D	Votes	%	D	Votes	%	D	Votes	%	D	Votes	%	Votes	%	Votes	%
Artigas	15,046	26.6	1	24,224	42.9	1	4,813	8.5	0	10,084	17.8	0	185	0.3	0	139	0.2	0	151	0.3	0	358	0.6	55,000	97.4	1,496	2.6
Canelones	158,221	42.8	7	101,417	27.4	4	35,177	9.5	2	35,202	9.5	2	6,409	1.7	0	5,347	1.4	0	3,601	1.0	0	7,557	2.0	352,931	95.5	16,639	4.5
Cerro Largo	19,895	29.5	1	26,215	38.9	1	5,257	7.8	0	12,232	18.1	1	317	0.5	0	401	0.6	0	259	0.4	0	647	1.0	65,223	96.7	2,227	3.3
Colonia	34,068	34.9	1	32,691	33.5	1	15,750	16.2	1	7,099	7.3	0	958	1.0	0	1,104	1.1	0	879	0.9	0	1,098	1.1	93,647	96.1	3,835	3.9
Durazno	13,087	28.0	1	16,577	35.5	1	5,852	12.5	0	8,135	17.4	0	275	0.6	0	258	0.6	0	325	0.7	0	703	1.5	45,212	96.9	1,460	3.1
Flores	5,308	25.4	1	7,357	35.3	1	4,055	19.4	0	2,874	13.8	0	134	0.6	0	204	1.0	0	116	0.6	0	187	0.9	20,235	97.0	635	3.0
Florida	17,267	32.1	1	18,809	35.0	1	7,919	14.7	0	5,611	10.4	0	359	0.7	0	454	0.8	0	405	0.8	0	930	1.7	51,754	96.3	2,012	3.7
Lavalleja	11,856	24.7	1	17,608	36.7	1	8,198	17.1	0	7,024	14.6	0	491	1.0	0	325	0.7	0	377	0.8	0	478	1.0	46,357	96.6	1,636	3.4
Maldonado	37,496	29.1	1	47,339	36.7	2	15,281	11.9	1	15,751	12.2	1	2,782	2.2	0	1,229	1.0	0	1,437	1.1	0	2,648	2.1	123,963	96.2	4,863	3.8
Montevideo	438,839	47.4	19	214,675	23.2	9	98,559	10.6	5	76,410	8.3	4	15,978	1.7	1	11,715	1.3	1	12,415	1.3	1	24,768	2.7	893,359	96.5	32,342	3.5
Paysandú	32,698	37.8	1	28,971	33.5	1	11,378	13.1	1	6,919	8.0	0	1,154	1.3	0	701	0.8	0	509	0.6	0	1,309	1.5	83,639	96.6	2,926	3.4
Rio Negro	14,263	34.0	1	13,546	32.3	1	6,816	16.2	0	4,604	11.0	0	325	0.8	0	224	0.5	0	286	0.7	0	439	1.0	40,503	96.6	1,446	3.4
Rivera	15,274	19.2	0	20,419	25.7	1	21,256	26.7	1	18,948	23.8	1	181	0.2	0	231	0.3	0	261	0.3	0	717	0.9	77,287	97.2	2,230	2.8
Rocha	18,903	32.8	1	17,317	30.1	1	5,788	10.1	0	10,553	18.3	0	919	1.6	0	348	0.6	0	310	0.5	0	1,055	1.8	55,193	95.8	2,395	4.2
Salto	33,720	35.6	1	21,681	22.9	0	22,001	23.3	1	11,474	12.1	1	506	0.5	0	1,080	1.1	0	561	0.6	0	747	0.8	91,770	97.0	2,829	3.0
San Jose	29,257	37.3	1	26,360	33.6	1	8,140	10.4	0	8,022	10.2	0	897	1.1	0	792	1.0	0	748	1.0	0	1,135	1.4	75,351	95.9	3,187	4.1
Soriano	23,386	34.7	1	20,951	31.1	1	10,454	15.5	1	7,620	11.3	0	877	1.3	0	476	0.7	0	310	0.5	0	809	1.2	64,883	96.4	2,450	3.6
Tacuarembó	20,239	27.7	1	25,221	34.6	1	10,198	14.0	0	12,252	16.8	1	516	0.7	0	969	1.3	0	487	0.7	0	772	1.1	70,654	96.8	2,300	3.2
Treinta y Tres	10,553	26.7	1	15,074	38.2	1	3,285	8.3	0	7,922	20.1	0	198	0.5	0	316	0.8	0	143	0.4	0	513	1.3	38,004	96.2	1,491	3.8
Total	949,376	39.01	42	696,452	28.62	30	300,177	12.34	13	268,736	11.04	11	33,461	1.38	1	26,313	1.08	1	23,580	0.97	1	46,870	1.93	2,344,965	96.37	88,399	3.63
Sources: Corte Electoral

Second round
Constituency	Broad Front		National Party		Valid votes		Invalid votes	
Constituency	Votes	%	Votes	%	Votes	%	Votes	%
Artigas	19,800	35.2	34,958	62.2	54,758	97.48	1,418	2.5
Canelones	189,577	51.3	165,350	44.7	354,927	96.01	14,757	4.0
Cerro Largo	26,466	39.4	38,620	57.4	65,086	96.80	2,151	3.2
Colonia	41,946	43.1	52,111	53.5	94,057	96.58	3,332	3.4
Durazno	17,905	38.5	26,948	57.9	44,853	96.36	1,696	3.6
Flores	6,990	33.6	13,102	62.9	20,092	96.49	731	3.5
Florida	22,419	41.7	29,257	54.4	51,676	96.07	2,115	3.9
Lavalleja	15,934	33.3	30,249	63.1	46,183	96.39	1,731	3.6
Maldonado	48,768	37.9	74,193	57.6	122,961	95.51	5,780	4.5
Montevideo	507,346	54.7	383,991	41.4	891,337	96.09	36,288	3.9
Paysandú	40,114	46.3	43,404	50.1	83,518	96.44	3,087	3.6
Rio Negro	17,485	41.8	22,953	54.9	40,438	96.74	1,362	3.3
Rivera	24,029	30.3	52,842	66.7	76,871	97.08	2,311	2.9
Rocha	24,129	41.9	30,736	53.4	54,865	95.35	2,676	4.7
Salto	43,398	46.0	48,240	51.1	91,638	97.10	2,739	2.9
San Jose	35,178	44.9	40,247	51.3	75,425	96.20	2,979	3.8
Soriano	30,453	45.3	34,318	51.0	64,771	96.31	2,485	3.7
Tacuarembó	26,179	36.0	44,092	60.6	70,271	96.64	2,440	3.4
Treinta y Tres	14,155	35.9	23,702	60.2	37,857	96.14	1,519	3.9
Total	1,152,271	47.4	1,189,313	48.9	2,341,584	96.24	91,612	3.77
Source: Corte Electoral
