= Ernesto Talvi =

Uruguayan economist

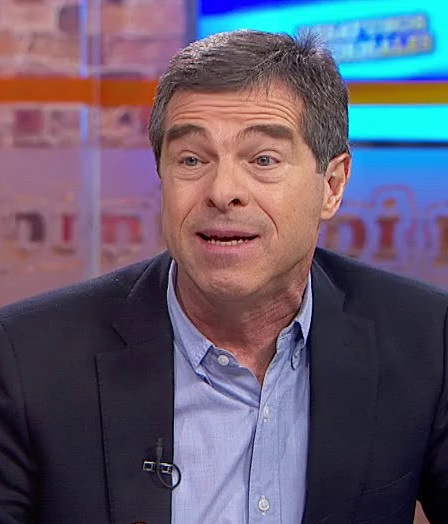

Minister of Foreign Affairs
- In office 1 March 2020 – 1 July 2020
- President: Luis Lacalle Pou
- Preceded by: Rodolfo Nin Novoa
- Succeeded by: Francisco Bustillo

Personal details
- Born: 10 June 1957 (age 69) Montevideo, Uruguay
- Party: Colorado Party
- Children: 2
- Education: Universidad de la República; University of Chicago

Ernesto Talvi Pérez (born June 10, 1957 in Montevideo) is a Uruguayan economist. He served as Minister of Foreign Relations of Uruguay from 1 March to 6 July 2020.

== Early life ==
Born to a Macedonian-born father and a Cuban mother, both of Sephardic (Turkish-Jewish) descent, Talvi attended The British Schools of Montevideo, afterwards he graduated from the University of the Republic and the University of Chicago.

== Career ==
In 1990 he was appointed by Ramón Díaz, chairman of the Central Bank of Uruguay, to lead Economic Policy. From 1990 until 1995, inflation came down from 95.41% to 44.25%. He presided over the thinktank CERES since 1997 until 2018, when he left to pursue a political career.

=== Political career ===
Joining the Colorado Party, he contested the 2019 June primaries, and emerged as presidential candidate after beating former president Julio María Sanguinetti at the primaries in June, with 55% of the votes. He drew the attention of many center-leaning, young voters because of his liberal policies and support for same-sex marriage and other leftist policies implemented by the Broad Front governments, describing himself as both "liberal and progressive".

Ciudadanos, his political group within the party won 47% of the 300,000 Colorado votes, the latter representing 12.8% of the total valid votes in the October general election. As the November runoff election was hold between Luis Lacalle Pou and Daniel Martínez, the Colorado Party entered a coalition of 5 parties, led by the National Party, which ended Broad Front rule of the country for three consecutive terms. Talvi served as Minister of Foreign Relations in the first four months of Lacalle's presidency. He resigned from this position on July 1, 2020, stating "It has been a privilege to serve the citizens of Uruguay from the Foreign Ministry at this time in which it was necessary to face extremely complex challenges", with the goal of dedicating himself to leading his political sector. He was replaced by diplomat Francisco Bustillo, former Uruguayan ambassador to Argentina and Spain, who took office on July 6. However, on July 26, Talvi resigned his seat in the Senate, announcing his total abandonment of political activity.
