= Senate of Uruguay =

Upper house of the General Assembly of Uruguay

Coordinates: 34°53′28″S 56°11′14″W

Chamber of Senators Cámara de Senadores
- 50th Legislature

Type
- Type: Upper house of the General Assembly of Uruguay

History
- Founded: 4 October 1830

Leadership
- President of the Senate: Carolina Cosse (Broad Front) since 1 March 2025

Structure
- Seats: 30
- Political groups: Government (16): Broad Front (16); Opposition (14): National (9); Colorado (5)

Elections
- Voting system: Ley de lemas (D'Hondt method)
- Last election: 27 October 2024
- Next election: 27 October 2029

Meeting place
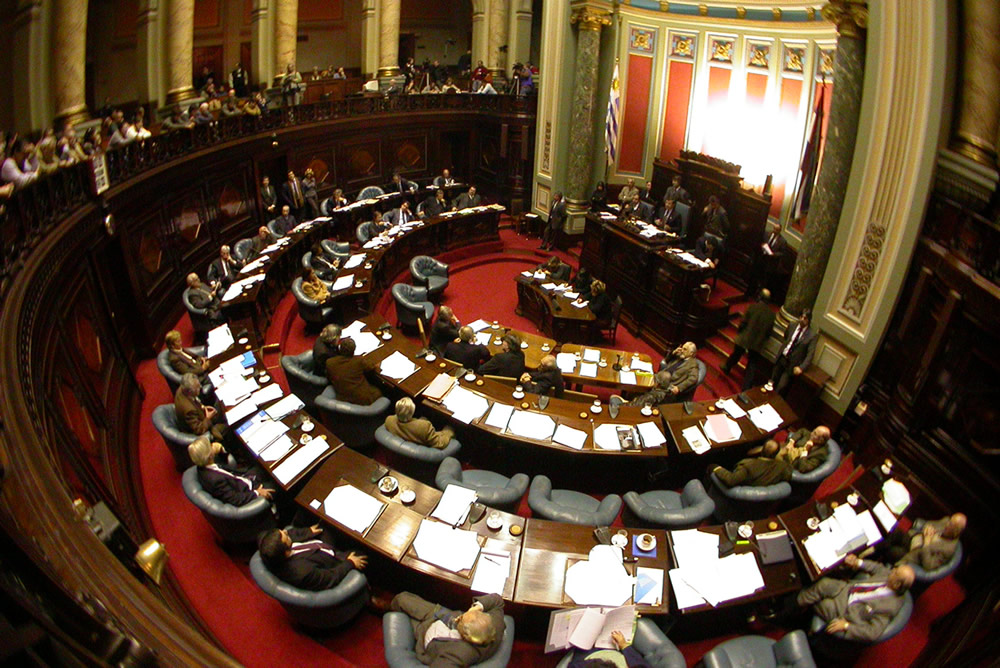
- The Senate into the Palacio Legislativo

Website
- Official website

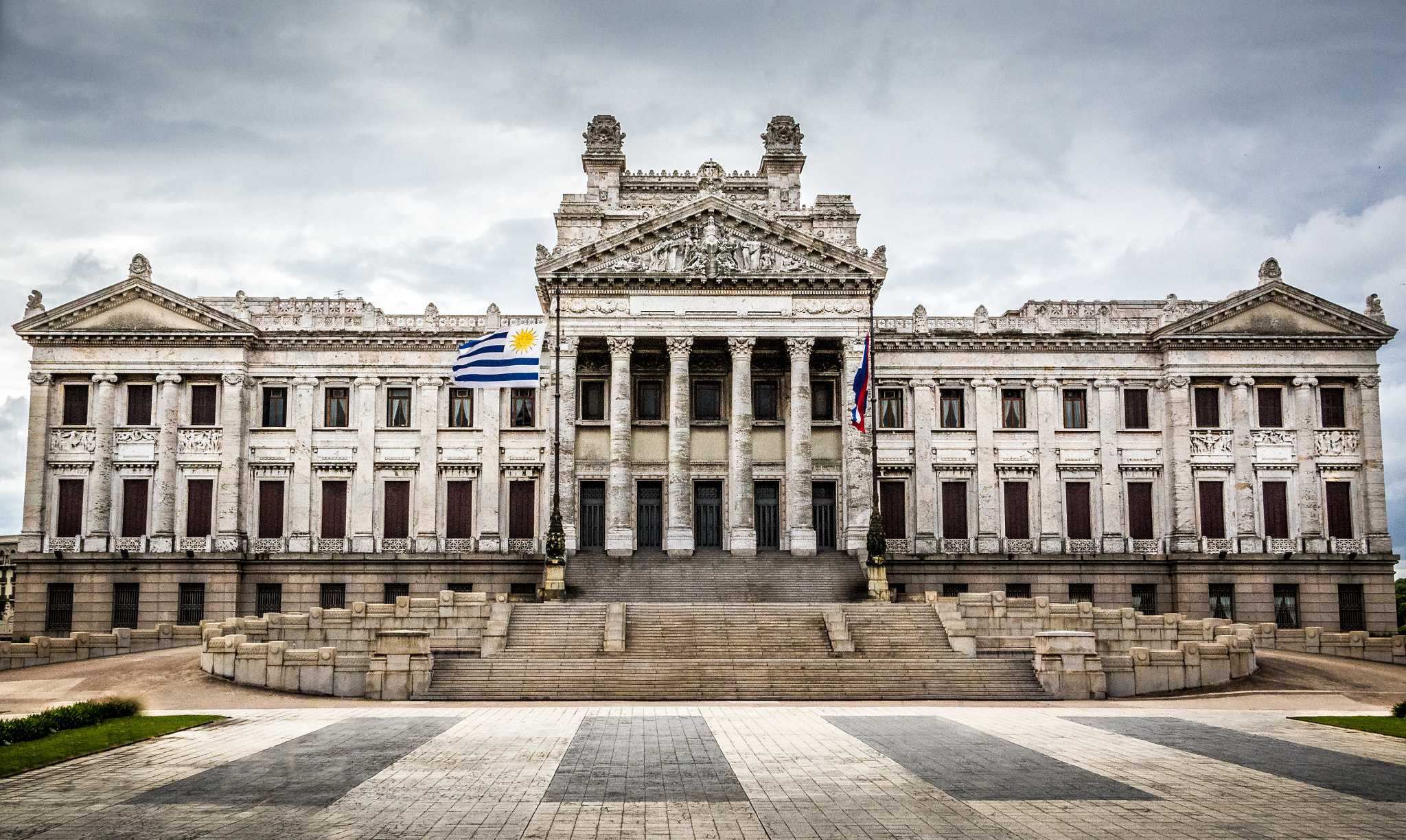
The Palacio Legislativo, meeting place of the Senate

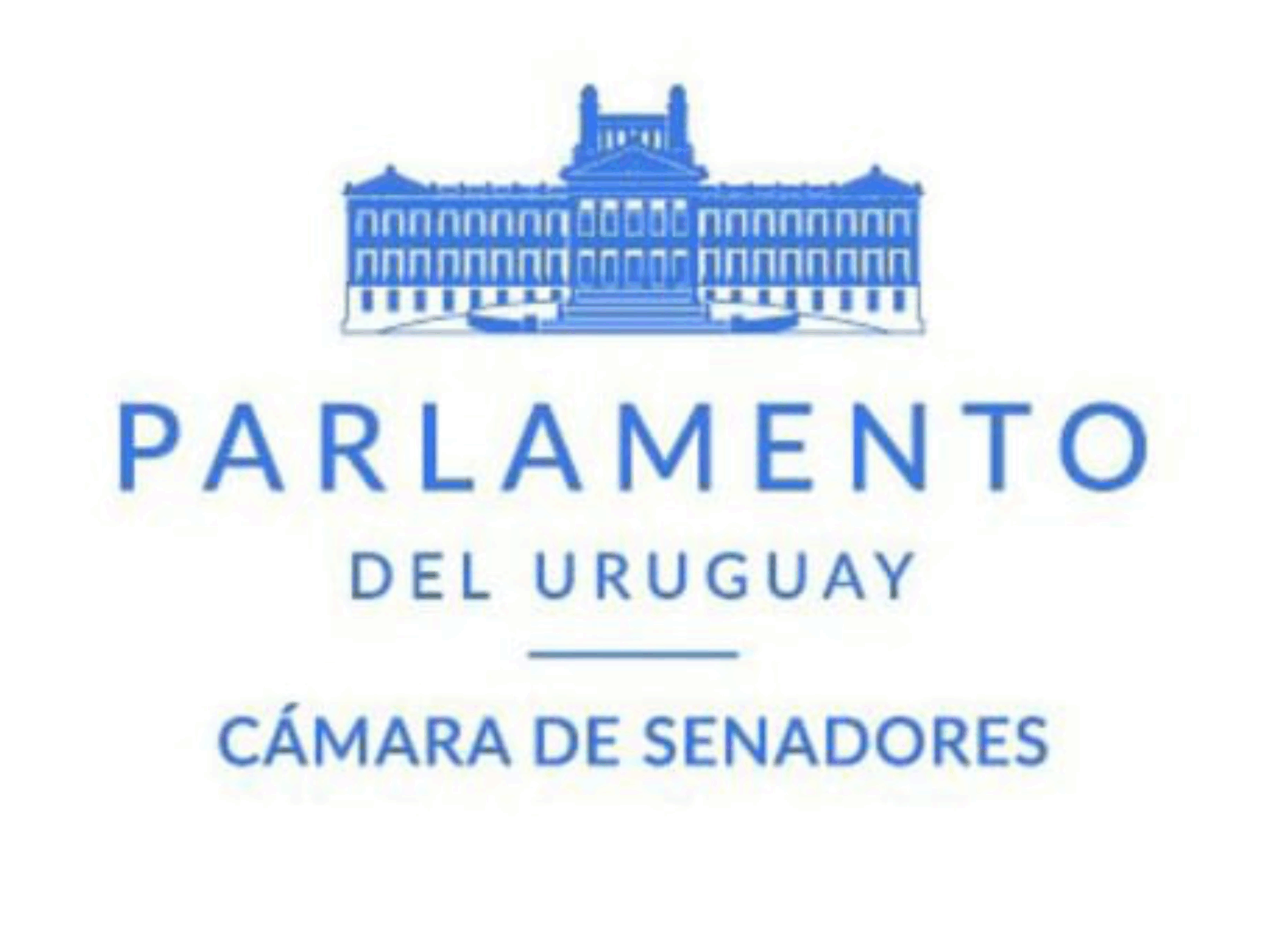
Actual logo.

The Chamber of Senators of Uruguay (Cámara de Senadores de Uruguay), or Senate, is the upper house of the General Assembly of Uruguay (Asamblea General de Uruguay). It has 30 members, elected for a five-year term by proportional representation; the vice-president presides over the chamber's sessions.

The composition and powers of the Senate are established by Article Ninety-eight of the Uruguayan Constitution. It also requires that the senators must be at least 30 years old and have been Uruguayan citizens for seven years. In addition to the functions that it performs jointly with the House of Representatives through the General Assembly, it alone holds public trials of those impeached by the House of Representatives or the Departamental Board. If convicted by 2/3 of the Senators, they may (only) remove them from office.

== Latest elections ==
Party	Senate			
Party	Votes	%	Seats	+/–
Broad Front	1,071,826	43.86	16	+3
National Party	655,426	26.82	9	–1
Colorado Party	392,592	16.07	5	+1
Sovereign Identity	65,796	2.69	0	New
Open Cabildo	60,549	2.48	0	–3
Partido Ecologista Radical Intransigente	33,461	1.43	0	0
Constitutional Environmentalist Party	11 865	0.49	0	New
Independent Party	41,618	1.70	0	0
Popular Unity-Workers' Party	10 102	0.41	0	0
For Necessary Changes Party	3,183	0.14	0	New
Republican Advance Party	1,909	0.08	0	New
Invalid/blank votes	85,106	–	–	–
Total	2,443,901	100.00	30	0
Source: Corte Electoral

== See also ==
- List of presidents of the Senate of Uruguay
