= Presidency of Luis Lacalle Pou =

42nd and presidential administration of Uruguay, 2020–2025

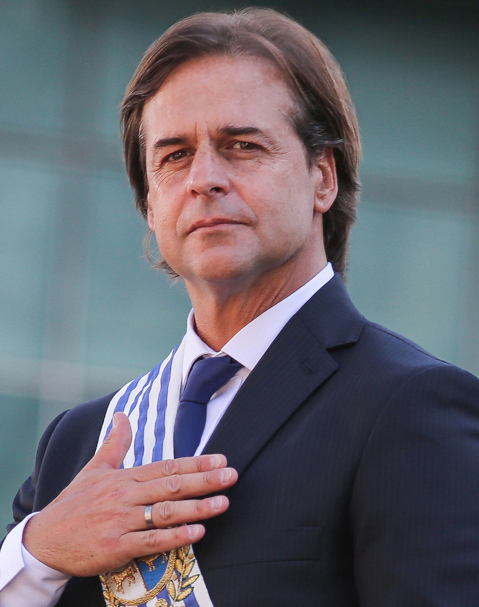
- Official portrait, 2020
- Presidency of Luis Lacalle Pou; 1 March 2020 – 1 March 2025
- Vice President: Beatriz Argimón
- Cabinet: See list
- Party: National
- Election: 2019
- Seat: Executive Tower
- Coat of Arms

The Presidency of Luis Lacalle Pou refers to Luis Lacalle Pou's tenure as the 42nd president of Uruguay which began on 1 March 2020 following his inauguration until it ended on 1 March 2025. Lacalle Pou, a member of the National Party took office following his victory over the Broad Front nominee Daniel Martínez in the second round of the 2019 general election, which ended the 15-year leftist rule in the country and the return of National Party to the Executive since his own father was the president from 1990 until 1995. On 16 December 2019, after his victory in the second round and before his inauguration, he announced his cabinet consisting of leaders of National, Colorado, Cabildo Abierto and Independent parties, members of the Multicolor Coalition.

Lacalle entered office just days before the outbreak of the COVID-19 pandemic, which dominated most of the political agenda during the first two years of his presidency. Within the first 100 days, his administration sent a bill to the General Assembly under the label of "Urgent Consideration Law", and after being approved within certain constitutional deadlines, it introduced a series of significant reforms in areas such as public security and criminal law, economic and fiscal policy, and labor and environmental law. In March 2022, almost halfway through Lacalle's term, after an opposition campaign, the electorate was asked in a referendum whether 135 articles of this law should be repealed.

The Lacalle administration carried out a reform of the educational system and the retirement and pension law. In March 2020, "Operation Safe Border" was launched in which thousands of troops from the three branches of the Armed Forces were deployed in the border areas with Brazil and Argentina to combat insecurity, smuggling and drug trafficking. The foreign policy objective of the Lacalle administration is to achieve greater flexibility in the rules of the Southern Common Market to trade outside the bloc and expand the free trade area, which has caused strain within the organization towards its neighbouring countries. Lacalle condemned the Russian invasion of Ukraine and Hamas as terrorism during the Gaza war, as well as accused Nicolás Maduro, Daniel Ortega and Miguel Díaz-Canel of leading dictatorial governments in their respective countries.

During the drought that occurred between 2022 and 2023, Lacalle declared a state of "water emergency" on June 19, 2023 and tax exemptions for bottled water, as well as the construction of a new reservoir and pipeline for water transfer in the San José River. Controversies in Lacalle administration include the Astesiano Case, in which Alejandro Astesiano, former chief custodian, who was dismissed from his position and subsequently arrested for forging Uruguayan identity cards and passports to Russian citizens.

== Background ==
=== Candidacy for the presidency and election ===
Lacalle Pou, at the time of his election, was a 19-year member of the General Assembly: from 2000 to 2015 he served as a National Representative and from 2015 to 2019 as a Senator. In 2011, he held the position of President of the Chamber of Representatives during the first session of the 47th Legislature. He participated in the 2014 election, being defeated in the second round by Tabaré Vázquez.

Facing the 2019 runoff election, Lacalle Pou led the Coalición Multicolor, an electoral alliance made up of center-right parties. Lacalle Pou and his running-mate, Beatriz Argimón obtained 48.71% of the unofficial vote. Their opponents, Daniel Martínez and Graciela Villar obtained 47.51% of the vote. The Electoral Court of Uruguay would publish the official results by Friday, 29 November 2019, as observed votes were still to be counted, totaling more than the difference between the two candidates, thus being too close to call. Daniel Martinez did not concede the race then, awaiting the official count. Lacalle Pou unofficially declared himself the winner, as the votes already counted marked an irreversible trend. Martínez conceded defeat on 28 November 2019. On 30 November, final votes counts confirmed Lacalle Pou as the winner with 48.8% of the total votes cast over Martínez with 47.3%. Lacalle Pou's victory marked the return of the National Party to power, 30 years after Luis Alberto Lacalle Herrera, Lacalle Pou's father, assumed as president.

Several international leaders reacted to Lacalle Pou for his victory. Congratulations came from the President and the elect-President of Argentina, Mauricio Macri and Alberto Fernández, the Acting President of Venezuela, Juan Guaidó, the President of Bolivia, Jeanine Añez, the Brazilian President Jair Bolsonaro, the Peruvian, Martín Vizcarra, the Paraguayan, Mario Abdo Benítez, and the Costa Rican Carlos Alvarado Quesada. In addition, the Mexican Secretary of Foreign, Marcelo Ebrard and the U.S. Secretary of State Mike Pompeo also congratulated the newly elected president.

=== Transition ===
On 2 December 2019 president-elect Luis Lacalle Pou met up with outgoing president Tabaré Vázquez in the Executive Tower to begin the transition process. The next day the same process started in the Parliament, between outgoing vice president Lucía Topolansky and Beatriz Argimón.

On 10 December Lacalle Pou travelled together with president Vázquez to attend the inauguration of Argentine president Alberto Fernández. Some days later he publicly announced his predicted cabinet, made up by members of Multicolor Coalition parties.

== Inauguration ==
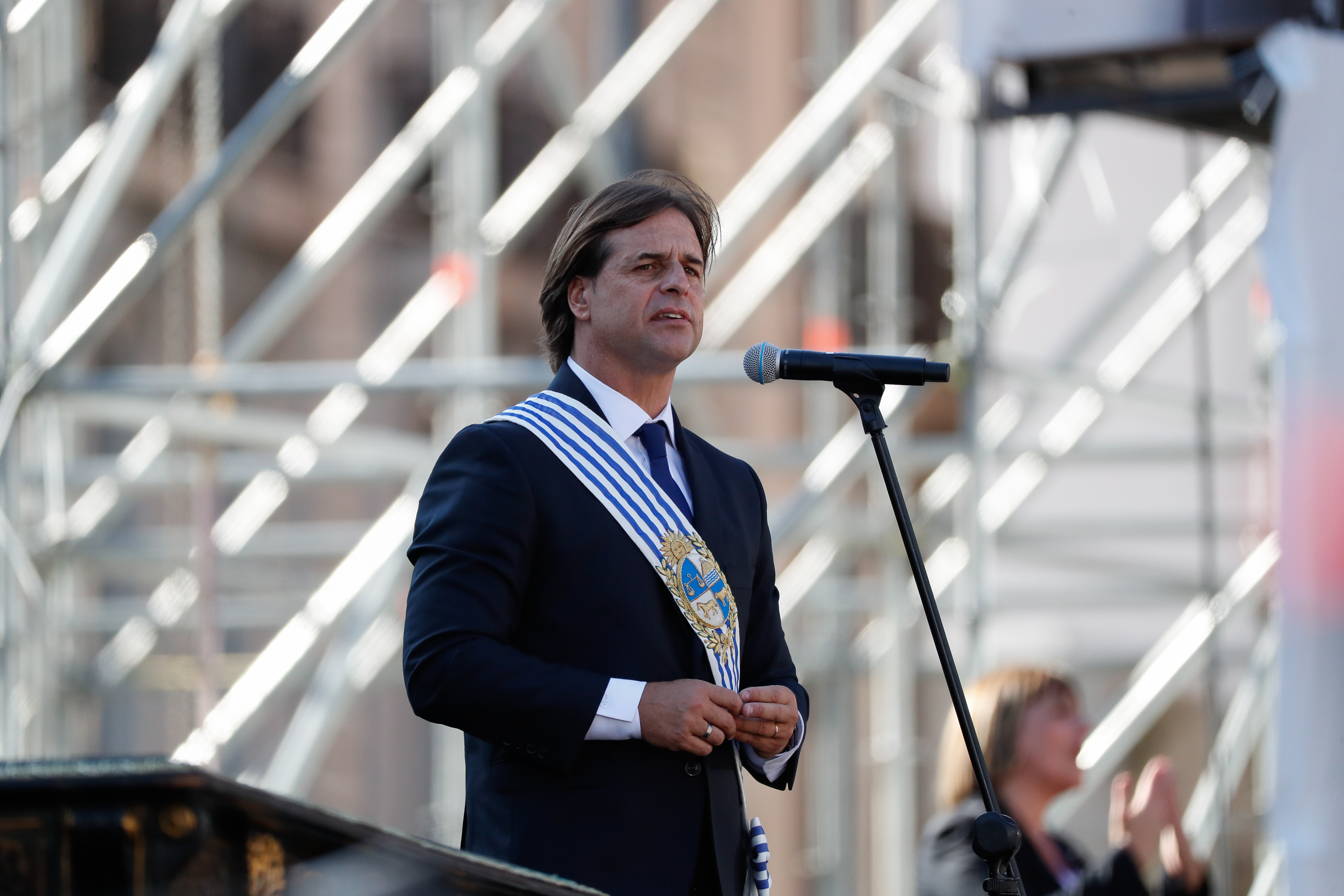
Luis Lacalle Pou during the transfer of authority ceremony in Independence Square, Montevideo, on 1 March 2020.

President Lacalle Pou and Vice President Argimón took office on 1 March 2020. After making the Constitutional Oath after the General Assembly, they paraded from Libertador Avenue travelling in a convertible 1937 Ford V8 that belonged to his great-grandfather Luis Alberto de Herrera. The inauguration tour in Montevideo ended at the Plaza Independencia, where Lacalle Pou received the presidential sash from the outgoing president Tabaré Vázquez.

During his electoral campaign he announced the introduction of a package of public measures through an Urgent Law, a prerogative of the Executive Power in Uruguay that allows the Executive administration send to the General Assembly a bill with a termination period of 90 days after which the bill is automatically approved if the Parliament did not approve nor reject it before that date. On 13 March 2020, less than two weeks of Lacalle's administration being passed, the Ministry of Public Health announced the detection of the first cases of COVID-19 in Uruguay. Due to that, the measures taken by the government to deal with the health emergency delayed the presentation of the project, which finally reached the General Assembly on 23 April 2020.

In the first weeks of started this administration, the Uruguayan authorities had to deal with the arrival of the COVID-19 pandemic, that forced the declaration of national health emergency and the adoption of several exceptional measures.

== Cabinet ==
Lacalle Pou's cabinet is made up of members of the parties of the Coalición Multicolor. Its structure was announced on December 16, 2019, at the Dazzler Hotel in Montevideo. From National Party, Alvaro Delgado was going to be appointed as Secretary of the Presidency, Rodrigo Ferrés as Deputy Secretary of the President, Javier García as minister of National Defense, Pablo Bartol as minister of Social Development, Azucena Arbeleche as minister of Economy and Finance, Pablo Da Silveira as minister of Education and Culture, Carlos Uriarte as minister of Livestock, Agriculture and Fisheries, Omar Paganini as minister of Industry, Energy and Mining, Jorge Larrañaga as minister of the Interior, and Luis Heber as minister of Transport and Public Works. From Colorado Party, Ernesto Talvi as minister of Foreign Relations and Germán Cardoso as minister of Tourism. From Cabildo Abierto party, Irene Moreira as minister of Housing, Territorial Planning and Daniel Salinas as minister of Public Health. From the Independent party was appointed Pablo Mieres as minister of Labour and Social Welfare.

Due to the resignation of Ernesto Talvi as Minister of Foreign Affairs in early July, Lacalle Pou appointed the former Ambassador of Uruguay to Argentina and Spain, Francisco Bustillo, as head of the ministry.

On 22 May 2021 the minister of the Interior Jorge Larrañaga died of a heart attack. In order to fill the sudden vacancy president Lacalle Pou announced on 24 May the appointment of Luis Alberto Heber as the new minister of the Interior, while the vacancy originated from the transference of Heber was to be filled by José Luis Falero, who in turn left his seat as subdirector of the Office of Planning and Budget.

On 27 June 2021 the fifth change in Lacalle Pou's cabinet has occurred with the replacement of Carlos María Uriarte with Fernando Mattos as the new minister of Livestock, Agriculture and Fisheries, until then president of the National Institute of Meat, being both members of Colorado party.

Cabinet of Luis Lacalle Pou's Government
Office	Name	Political party	Term
Ministry of National Defense	Javier García Duchini	National	1 March 2020 – 4 March 2024
Ministry of National Defense	Armando Castaingdebat	National	4 March 2024 – 1 March 2025
Ministry of the Interior	Jorge Larrañaga	National	1 March 2020 – 22 May 2021
Ministry of the Interior	Luis Alberto Héber	National	24 May 2021 – 4 November 2023
Ministry of the Interior	Nicolás Martinelli	National	6 November 2023 – 1 March 2025
Ministry of Foreign Relations	Ernesto Talvi	Colorado	1 March 2020 – 6 July 2020
Ministry of Foreign Relations	Francisco Bustillo	nonpartisan politician	6 July 2020 – 1 November 2023
Ministry of Foreign Relations	Omar Paganini	National	6 November 2023 – 1 March 2025
Ministry of Economy and Finance	Azucena Arbeleche	National	1 March 2020 – 1 March 2025
Ministry of Education and Culture	Pablo Da Silveira	National	1 March 2020 – 1 March 2025
Ministry of Public Health	Daniel Salinas	Open Cabildo	1 March 2020 – 13 March 2023
Ministry of Public Health	Karina Rando	Open Cabildo	13 March 2023 – 1 March 2025
Ministry of Social Development	Pablo Bartol	National	1 March 2020 – 1 May 2021
Ministry of Social Development	Martín Lema	National	3 May 2021 – 4 March 2024
Ministry of Social Development	Alejandro Sciarra	National	4 March 2024 – 1 March 2025
Ministry of Labour and Social Welfare	Pablo Mieres	Independent	1 March 2020 – 1 March 2025
Ministry of Transport and Public Works	Luis Alberto Héber	National	1 March 2020 – 24 May 2021
Ministry of Transport and Public Works	José Luis Falero	National	25 May 2021 – 1 March 2025
Ministry of Livestock, Agriculture, and Fisheries	Carlos María Uriarte	Colorado	1 March 2020 – 27 June 2021
Ministry of Livestock, Agriculture, and Fisheries	Fernando Mattos	Colorado	27 June 2021 – 1 March 2025
Ministry of Industry, Energy and Mining	Omar Paganini	National	1 March 2020 – 4 November 2023
Ministry of Industry, Energy and Mining	Elisa Faccio	National	6 November 2023 – 1 March 2025
Ministry of Housing and Territorial Planning	Irene Moreira	Open Cabildo	1 March 2020 – 5 May 2023
Ministry of Housing and Territorial Planning	Raúl Lozano Bonet	Open Cabildo	9 May 2023 – 1 March 2025
Ministry of Tourism	Germán Cardoso	Colorado	1 March 2020 – 22 March 2021
Ministry of Tourism	Tabaré Viera	Colorado	23 August 2021 – 11 March 2024
Ministry of Tourism	Eduardo Sanguinetti	Colorado	11 March 2024 – 1 March 2025
Ministry of Environment	Adrián Peña	Colorado	27 August 2020 – 30 January 2023
Ministry of Environment	Robert Bouvier	Colorado	1 February 2023 – 1 March 2025
Secretariat of Sports	Sebastián Bauzá	National	1 March 2020 – 1 March 2025
Secretariat of the Presidency	Álvaro Delgado	National	1 March 2020 – 21 December 2023
Secretariat of the Presidency	Rodrigo Ferrés	National	21 December 2023 – 1 March 2025
Deputy Secretariat of the Presidency	Rodrigo Ferrés	National	1 March 2020 – 21 December 2023
Deputy Secretariat of the Presidency	Mariana Cabrera	National	21 December 2023 – 1 March 2025
Office of Planning and Budget	Isaac Alfie	Colorado	1 March 2020 – 15 December 2023
Office of Planning and Budget	Fernando Blanco	National	15 December 2023 – 1 March 2025

== Domestic policy ==
=== Urgent Consideration Law ===
Law No. 19889 of urgent consideration, also called "Law of Urgent Consideration" or abbreviated as "LUC", is a law whose bill was announced by President Lacalle Pou during the campaign, which aims to lay the foundations of his administration. This law was the subject of intense political debate between the ruling party and the opposition:

- Modify legitimate defense in the Penal Code, increasing its concept and establishing new hypotheses in which legitimate defense is presumed.
- Increase penalties for crimes related to drug trafficking and sexual violence in all its forms.
- Punish injury or damage to police.
- Grant retired police and military personnel the right to carry arms.
- Limit occupations of public spaces and "pickets".
- Increase penalties for minor offenders.
- Reorganize public education, with the Central Board of Directors (CODICEN) consolidating the powers of primary, secondary, University of Labor of Uruguay (UTU) and teacher training councils, which now become directories.
- Modify the Financial Inclusion Law (LIF), letting workers opt to receive payment in cash rather than electronic means. In addition, the amount above which business payments must be effected electronically is raised to one million indexed units.
- Create the Ministry of Environment, one of the campaign promises of Luis Lacalle Pou's team.
- Limit occupations of workplaces, guaranteeing the right of non-strikers to access and work, and that of employers to enter the facilities freely.
- Establish a commission for the reform of the social welfare system.
- Guarantee the right to mobile number portability.

In October 2020 several social and political organizations announced that they were going to promote a referendum to repeal 135 articles of the Law of Urgent Consideration. After the campaign to collect support signatures to invoke the referendum ended, on 8 July 2021 the president of the national trade union confederation PIT-CNT announced that 763,443 signatures were collected and would be delivered that day after the Electoral Court to be validated. On 8 December 2021 the Electoral Court completed the validation procedure of the signatures and because the minimum signatures threshold to summon a referendum was reached, it called for a referendum to be held on 27 March 2022. After the referendum was held, the "NO" option won with 50.02% and therefore the 135 articles intended to be repealed were kept.

=== Public administration policies ===
Since July 2020 two regulatory public bodies, the Regulatory Unit of Energy and Water Services (URSEA) and the Regulatory Unit of Communication Services (URSEC) that were created during the presidency of Jorge Batlle, are not subordinated offices under the Executive anymore and from then they are decentralized services. Thus they gained their own legal autonomy and personhood. This was made in order to not have then subject to political issues and to make them structurally, functionally and budgetary independent. The new regulatory system as decentralized services also implies that they are now led by a board of directors according to the Constitution.

Since the inauguration of this presidency on 1 March 2020, the number of attachés to each ministry were reduced from 86 to 42 in August 2020. The reduction of attachés was part of the electoral program promises of the National Party. The attachés are persons who can be directly hired by the ministries as confidence personnel without being limited by number, but they are not able to become public servants. This kind of relationship was created by a budgetary law during the first year of the presidency of José Mujica and they are usually university graduates. However, their number increased to 47 by 31 December 2020 and to 56 by July 2022.

=== Culture ===
Starting from 13 March 2020 the "MEC Centers" (Centros MEC) cultural centers closed their doors. The minister of Education and Culture Pablo da Silveira intended to close them since 2018 before he was not even minister. The MEC Centers were a network of 127 centers created during the first presidency of Tabaré Vázquez and developed in the Ministry of Education and Culture (MEC) in coordination with the departmental governments, in order to decentralize the public policies on culture by opening cultural centers in several cities of the interior of Uruguay, each one managed authonomously with locals' needs in mind. But with the Budget Law of 2020 in the end they were permanently suppressed. During a parliamentary discussion of the Budget Law draft, the minister of Education and Culture Pablo da Silveira stood up for this measure arguing that these centers were a "kind of independent republic" and that their politics "did not coincide" with what the Ministry was intending to do. Also alleged that these centers were "misusing public funds". This change was condemned by the Broad Front legislators, among them member of parliament Gabriel Otero twitted saying that "67 cities were left without MEC Centers, they destroyed them without thinking about the people, without culture there is no future".

Meanwhile, MEC Centers remained closed and waiting their final elimination, the Urgent Consideration Law created in its 202nd article a new system of national cultural institutions to promote different cultural expressions, to be overseen by the Directorate of Culture of the Ministry of Education and Culture:

Institute	Description and goals
National Institute of Music	To support, encourage, spread, preserve, research and develop musical sector.
National Institute of Performing Arts	To develop performing arts, to record them and research about them. This institute was not actually created but existed since 2009 and operated in a building of Montevideo's Old Town, but with the Urgent Consideration Law it was given a legal framework.
National Institute of Literature	Created in order to obey the Books Law and other related laws, in addition to promote and spread of literature, specially that of national writers.
National Institute of Visual Arts	To protect, promote and spread nationally and internationally visual arts, as well as to research and to boost their scholarly research. This institute was expected to be created during the third government of the Broad Front but at last it was not created.
National Institute of Cinematography and Audiovisual art	This institute was actually created in 2008 by Law No. 18824. Its purpose is, among others, to promote the creation, production, and exhibition of national films in the country and abroad, to support the production of filmmaking initiatives and to advertise films and other audiovisual works in national education and culture.

In July 2021 minister Da Silveira said that the MEC Centers were suppressed because they were "problemantic" and they would be replaced by "a strategy that is more global, more ambitious that changes the perspective", and that the current administration did not want "to work for the [Uruguayan] interior, but together with them". The new system of decentralized cultural centers began to be deployed at the beginnings of 2022 due to the delay of COVID-19 pandemic, and the first National Cultural Center (CCN) designated was the Municipal Cultural Complex of Dolores.

=== Defense ===
On March 16, 2020, more than 1,000 soldiers of the Armed Forces were deployed to carry out the "Operation Safe Border", which consisted of patrolling the country's the 35,000 square kilometers of border defined to control, with the aim of combating insecurity, smuggling and drug trafficking. The Air Force put its fleet of Cessna A-37 Dragonfly into operation to conduct "reconnaissance, patrol, and surveillance" of the Northeast, while the Navy deployed its personnel and equipment in border lakes and rivers.

On September 8, the purchase of two Lockheed C-130 Hercules aircraft from the Spanish Government was announced, for a price of 21 million euros and 1 million euros in spare parts. The opposition criticized this purchase, describing it as an "inopportune expense". The aircraft arrived in Uruguay on December 19, Defense Minister Javier García stated that "a process of modernization of essential equipment begins. With this incorporation there is more sovereignty, more human security and more civil protection."

On December 22, 2020, the National Defense Council (CODENA) met for the first time. Chaired by President Lacalle Pou, it is an advisory and consultative body that works on the drafting of a decree with the defense guidelines for the entire term. The functions of the council are: to analyze threats that could harm the sovereignty and independence of the country, as well as seriously affect national interests; propose, in such cases, the measures or actions deemed necessary for its resolution; analyze and propose conflict hypotheses; suggest the adoption of strategies, approve the plans and coordinate the actions necessary for the defense, and make proposals on matters related to the defense that, because they affect various State agencies, require joint action.

=== Health ===
==== COVID-19 pandemic ====
The COVID-19 pandemic emerged within the first days of Lacalle Pou's presidency. The first four cases, all imported, were reported on 13 March. On 14 March, Lacalle requested the cancellation of public performances, and the closure of some public places. An awareness campaign was launched and citizens were advised to stay home. A two-week suspension of classes at public and private schools was also announced. On 16 March, Lacalle issued an order to close all border crossings except Carrasco International Airport. The border with Argentina was closed effective 17 March at midnight. On that day, the Ministry of Economy and Finance published a list of prices of products such as alcohol gel, rectified alcohol, and surgical masks, in order to prevent price gouging.

Given the advance of the coronavirus around the world, many governments ordered the closure of borders and the cessation of airport operations and cancellations of commercial flights. Due to the Uruguayans being stranded abroad, the then Foreign Minister Ernesto Talvi ordered the operation "All at home" for the return of Uruguayans who were outside the national territory, who do not reside abroad and who planned to return to the country but could not by these restrictions. In the course of this operation, at least 3,965 Uruguayans stranded in 67 countries returned. In addition, the repatriation of foreigners stranded in Uruguay to their countries of origin was carried out.

On 8 April, he announced the reopening of rural schools on 22 April. It was also reported that the reopening would be in educational centers in the interior of the country, excluding those of Montevideo and Canelones; and that attendance would be voluntary. It was 35% of the total registered. On April, 17 he informed that his administration decided to create a group, made up of experts that would define methods and studies to advise the government. The experts would be: the mathematician, electrical engineer, and academic from the Latin American Academy of Sciences, Fernando Paganini; Dr. Rafael Radi, the first Uruguayan scientist at the U.S. National Academy of Sciences and president of the National Academy of Sciences of Uruguay; and Dr. Henry Cohen Engelman, President of the National Academy of Medicine and awarded as a Master by the World Gastroenterology Organisation in 2019.

On 29 May, Lacalle himself, along with the Secretary of the Presidency, the Minister of National Defense, his private secretary and the ASSE President began a quarantine while awaiting the test, after having contact with the director of the Ministry of Social Development in Rivera, who was infected with COVID-19. A day later, after being tested, it was confirmed that neither he nor the other government officials had contracted the virus.

As of December 2, given the increase in cases (especially in Montevideo), a series of temporary measures were put into effect to slow growth. Among them the closure of sports activities in gyms and closed places, remote work requirements, closing of restaurants after midnight and the suspension of end-of-year parties.

On December 16, due to the exponential growth of cases, the Executive Power announced a new set of measures: the regulation of Article 38 of the Constitution (the power of the executive power to dissolve agglomerations); the prohibition of entry from abroad between December 21 and January 10; the reduction of the capacity in interdepartmental transportation by half on those dates; the extension of the opening hours of shopping malls and street markets; the reopening of gyms (with a maximum capacity of 30%) and the suspension of public shows.

==== General guidelines for the development of telehealth ====
On 2 April 2020, during the COVID-19 pandemic, the Telehealth Law No. 19869 was approved. It established general guidelines to deploy and develop telehealth as a way to improve the efficiency and quality of medical services, as well as to expand their coverage by using information and communications technologies. The geographic distance between the patient and the health professional is a factor that encourages the usage of these technologies in order to exchange information to perform medical diagnosis, to indicate medical treatments and to prevent diseases, in addition to being useful to health professionals for further training. According to that Law, the development of telehealth must be performed under the following principles: universality, guaranteed access of the entire population to health, equity by allowing the medical attention in remote locations or those without resources, quality of services both towards the patient and the personnel training, efficiency by optimizing the use of resources, decentralization of the National Integrated Health System, complementarity but without replacing direct treatment of the patient, and confidentiality of the medical-patient relationship as well as protecting the privacy during the remote exchange of medical information.

One article of the Telehealth Law was nonetheless criticized by Eduardo Cavalli, Minister of a Court of Appeals, who warned that the provision under article 7 regarding the patient's consent, it said that in the case of treatment of minors of age, the consent was to be given by their legal representative, however this was contradictory and against the rights of minors because, according to a pillar of the Convention on the Rights of the Child, they should be treated not according to their age but they have the right to express their views in all matters that affect minor's life in accordance with the maturity of the minor. To address this legal problem, the Broad Front representative Cristina Lustemberg promoted a reform bill to modify article 7 so that in medical procedures through telehealth the principle of progressive autonomy of minors' and disabled persons' will is observed, in order to fix the regression of rights. This ended up being approved in August 2021.

== Foreign policy ==
During Lacalle Pou's first days of presidency, Uruguay's foreign relations shifted substantially from those under Broad Front. After taking office, he condemned the government of Nicolás Maduro in Venezuela. And also Lacalle decided not to invite him to his inauguration stating "it is a personal decision, which I take care of. This is not the Chancellery, this is not protocol, this is my person who made this decision". The presidents of Cuba and Nicaragua were not invited either.

Lacalle's government ordered the withdrawal of Uruguay from the Union of South American Nations (UNASUR), arguing that it occurred because "it is an organization that became an ideological political alliance contrary to the country's objectives of linking." In addition, it was reported that the country would return to the Inter-American Treaty of Reciprocal Assistance (TIAR).

Between July 2 and December 16, 2020, Lacalle Pou served as President Pro Tempore of the Southern Common Market (MERCOSUR). In his inaugural speech, regarding the relationship with the United States and China, he stated that "one cannot fall into the false dichotomy of being closer to one or the other because the countries that have achieved development have been close to both." He was succeeded by Argentine President Alberto Fernández.

On September 12, Uruguay voted for Mauricio Claver-Carone's candidacy for President of the Inter-American Development Bank proposed by the United States. On September 14, Uruguay voted at the UN Economic and Social Council in favor of a resolution claiming that Israel was involved in "systematic violations" of the rights of Palestinians, which negatively affected Palestinian women and girls. Uruguayan Foreign Minister Francisco Bustillo declared that Uruguay's vote against Israel was a "circumstantial error" and assured that his country will be guided by its long-running policy of supporting Israel. He also removed from office the director general of political affairs of the Foreign Ministry, Ambassador Pablo Sader.

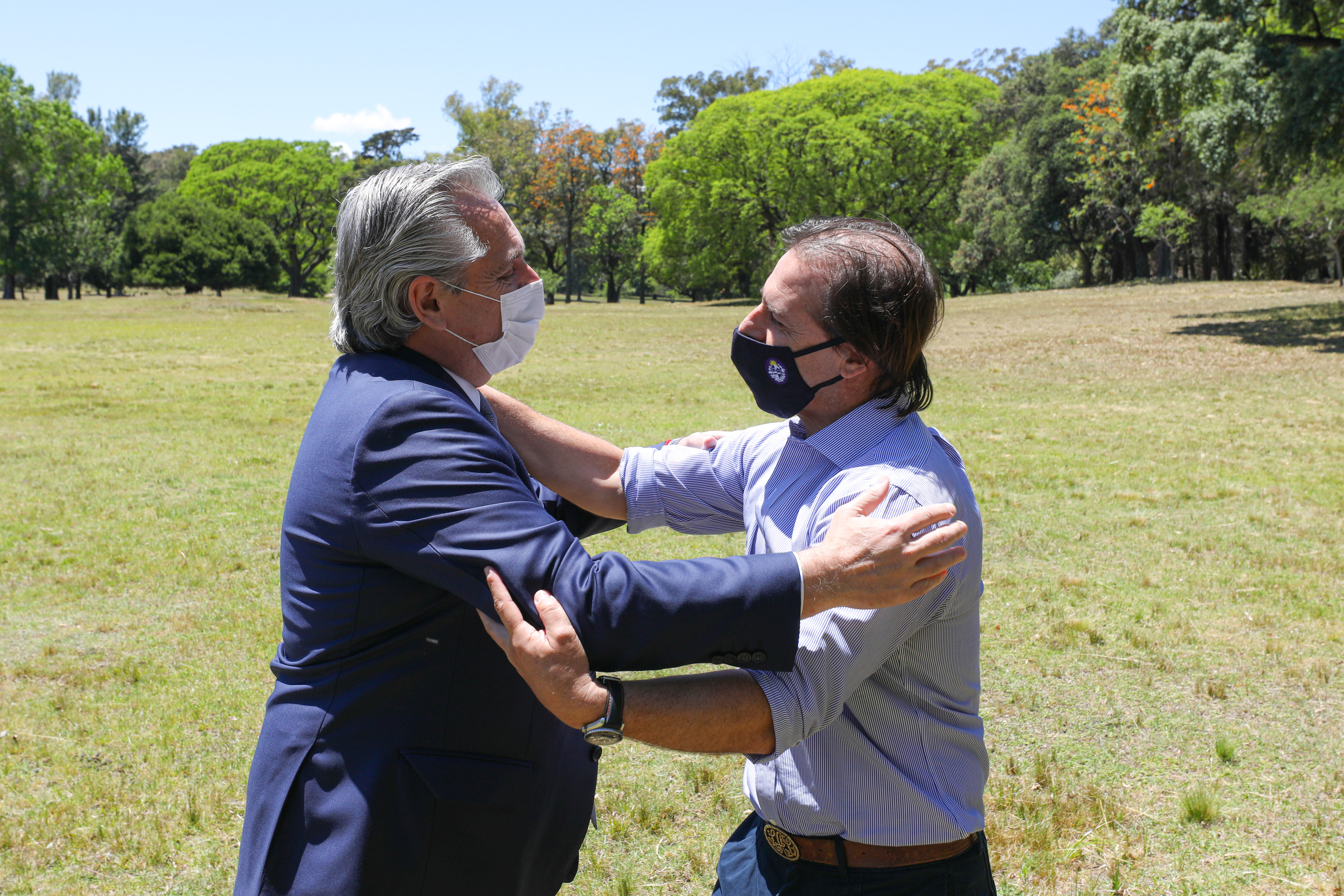
Argentine President Alberto Fernández with Lacalle Pou, 19 November 2020

On November 19, 2020, Lacalle received Argentine President Alberto Fernández at the Anchorena Presidential Estate. There they had a typical Uruguayan asado and discussed bilateral, regional and Mercosur-related issues, such as business opportunities with the European Union and the Paraná-Paraguay and Rio Uruguay waterway.

After the 2020 Venezuelan parliamentary election, the Uruguayan government supported the Organization of American States's resolution condemning fraud. Previously, through a press release, the Ministry of Foreign Relations stated that the elections lacked "minimum guarantees." When the Venezuelan National Assembly convened on January 5, 2021, a new press release indicated that "Uruguay does not recognize the legitimacy of the National Assembly installed in Venezuela today, because it is the result of an electoral act carried out without the minimum guarantees of transparency, inclusion and verification".

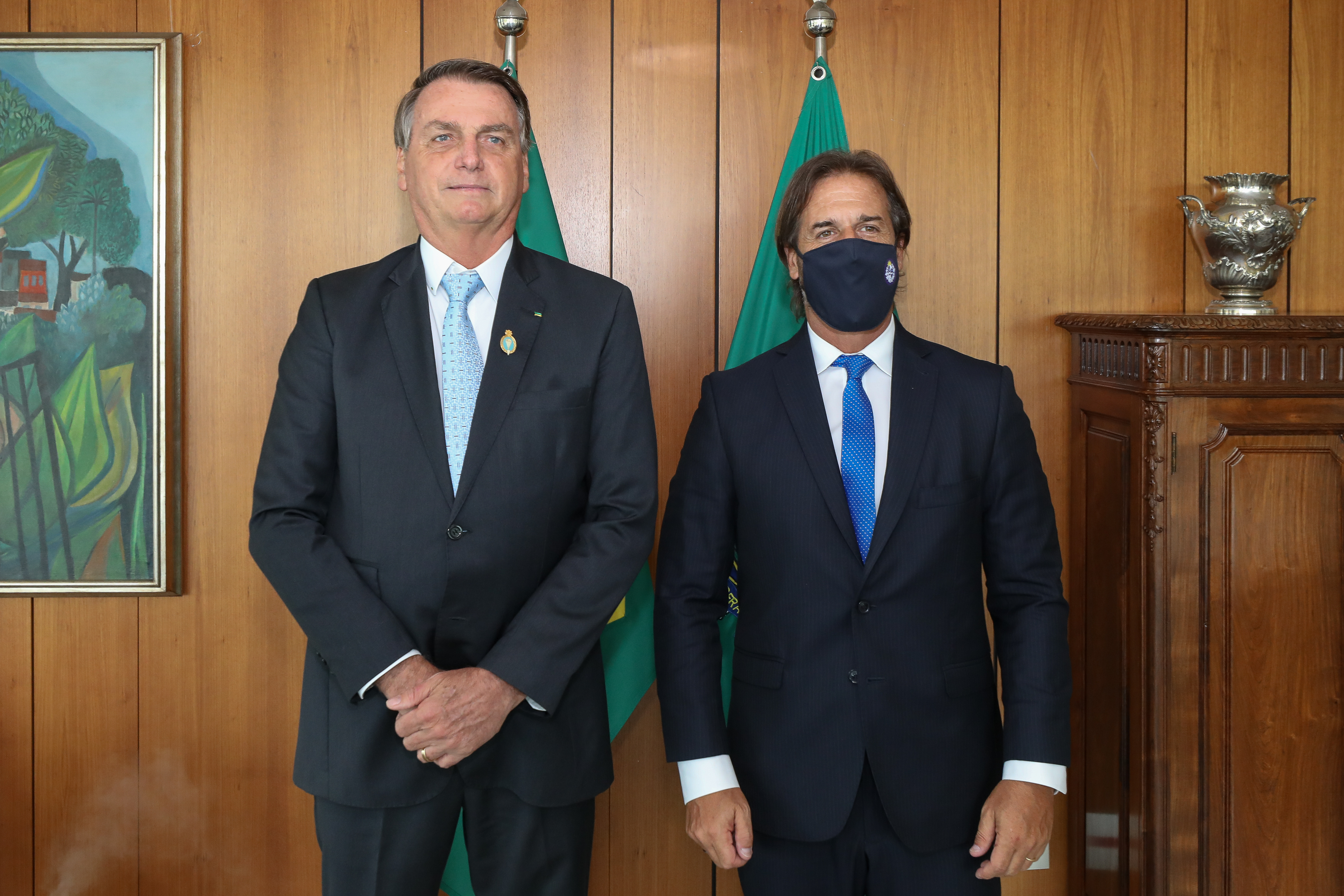
Lacalle Pou with Brazilian President Jair Bolsonaro at the Palácio da Alvorada, Brasília, 3 February 2021

On February 3, 2021, Lacalle made an official state to Brazil, being his first official trip abroad as head of state. After meeting with President Jair Bolsonaro, Lacalle stated "we have agreed on a huge number of issues, which are: the freedom of our peoples, the prosperity of our peoples and, of course, the good relationship between both countries."

On February 17, Lacalle received Paraguayan President Mario Abdo Benítez at the presidential residence in Punta del Este on an official visit. At the meeting, both leaders discussed the importance of Paraguayan trade and how Uruguay's waterways can help Paraguay reach the markets.

In May 2021, during the Israel–Palestine crisis, the Uruguayan government expressed its "deep concern over the acts of violence" and encouraged Israelis and Palestinians to curb it and guarantee the safety of all sacred sites. It also condemned the terrorist acts and the upsurge in attacks perpetrated from Gaza against Israeli territory.

In July 2021, the Lacalle Pou administration informed the member countries of the Southern Common Market (MERCOSUR) that Uruguay will begin bilateral trade negotiations outside the bloc. The announcement came after there were no agreements to lower tariffs and facilitate agreements with third parties during a meeting of foreign ministers prior to the summit of heads of state. Uruguayan government push to make the trade bloc's rules more flexible, aimed at modernising the group, because negotiation with third parties requires the unanimous approval from other members, and despite the fact that the Brazilian and Paraguayan governments are in favor, the Argentine government refuses to do so. On September 7, after meeting with the leaders of all political parties with parliamentary representation, Lacalle Pou announced at a press conference that formal negotiations had begun to carry out a pre-feasibility study for the signing of a treaty on free trade with the People's Republic of China.

On September 18, 2021, President Lacalle participated in the summit of the Community of Latin American and Caribbean States in Mexico City, in which he stated that his presence did not mean that his administration was "complacent" with some governments and slammed the lack of democracy in Venezuela, Cuba and Nicaragua.

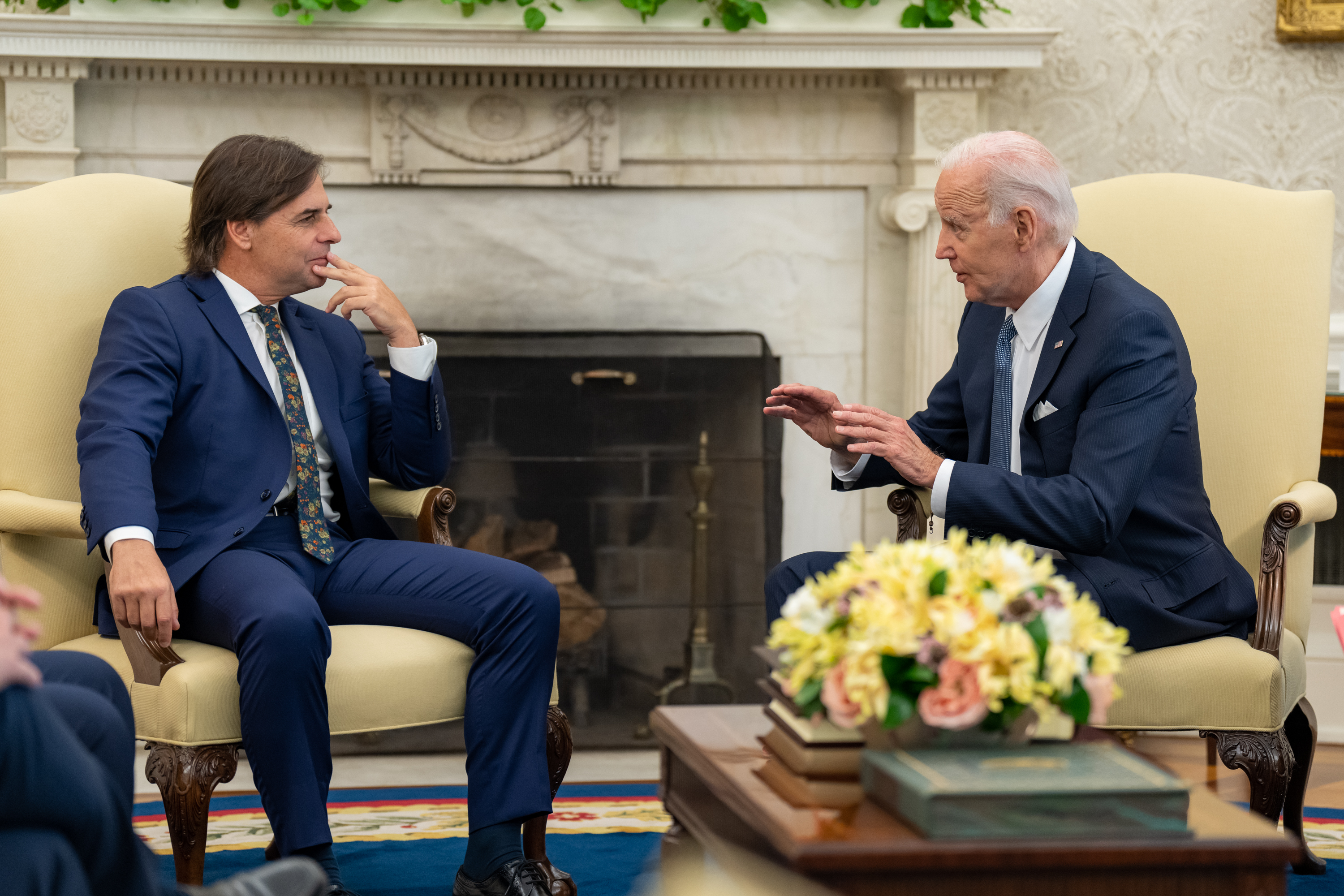
Lacalle Pou with U.S. President Joe Biden

On 23 February 2022, Uruguay's Ministry of Foreign Relations issued a statement condemning the use of force and urging all parties involved to take the necessary measures to reduce tensions and achieve a political agreement. The Uruguayan government expressed "concern" about the situation with the recognition of the separatist republics of Donetsk and Luhansk as sovereign states by Russia and the displacement of military troops, in violation of the principles of the Charter of the United Nations. In addition, it expressed that the country considers that the United Nations Security Council Resolution 2202 "provides the way for the application of the Minsk agreements, leading to a peaceful and lasting solution to the conflict", and that the solution should "respect the sovereignty, independence and territorial integrity" of Ukraine. After the invasion President Luis Lacalle Pou condemned Russia's "actions contrary to international law", and declared that Uruguay "is a country that is always committed to peace", for which he encouraged the return of negotiations for a "civilised resolution" of the conflict. In an official statement from the Ministry of Foreign Relations, the government stated that the principles of the Charter of the United Nations were "notoriously violated" after the Russian military attacks; and announced that four Uruguayan citizens were evacuated from Ukraine to Cyprus, and that it is monitoring the situation, attending to the situation of its "compatriots" in order to provide them with the proper assistance.

On May 23, 2022, Lacalle was received by British Prime Minister Boris Johnson in 10 Downing Street, on his first state visit to a European country. Both leaders committed to take immediate steps to reduce trade barriers between both two countries, "intensifying trade and investment in industries including pharmaceuticals and IT software". In turn, the UK government announced that it will continue to invest in education and training opportunities for the Uruguayan Armed Forces, and that both countries will remain associated within the framework of the UN Action for Peacekeeping Initiative.

== Opinion polling ==
According to a survey by Equipo Consultores, released on March 31, 2020, in Lacalle's first month as president, 65% of the Uruguayan population approved of his administration, while 20% disapproved of it and another 15% did not have an "intermediate opinion" or did not respond. Therefore, he was the first non-Broad Front president with the most approval in the first month of his term. In April, Opción Consultores released a survey in which the public was asked to evaluate Lacalle Pou's performance in relation to the COVID-19 pandemic: 40% of the Uruguayan population rated it as "very good" and 25% as "good", while 12% thought that the manage of the crisis was "very bad" while 9% just "bad"; 14% of the population did not have an opinion.

In his first 100 days in office, Lacalle obtained the approval of 62% of the population, while 18% disapproved, 17% had "intermediate opinions" and 2% did not express their opinion, according to a survey by Equipo Consultores. In September, according to an international poll conducted by IPSOS, Lacalle's administration was approved by 73% of the population, ranking as the president with the highest approval in Latin America.
