= 50th Legislature of the Chamber of Senators of Uruguay =

50th Legislature of the Chamber of Senators
←	49th

Overview
- Legislative body: General Assembly
- Jurisdiction: Uruguay
- Meeting place: Montevideo
- Term: 15 February 2025 – 15 February 2030
- Election: 27 October 2024
- Website: parlamento.gub.uy

Senate
- Members: 30 senators
- Senate president: Carolina Cosse (FA) (from March 1, 2025)
- Party control: FA

Sessions
- 1st: 15 February 2025 – 15 December 2025
- 2nd: 1 March 2026 –

The Fifty Legislature of the Chamber of Senators of Uruguay is the current meeting of the upper house of the Uruguayan General Assembly. It convened in Montevideo on February 15, 2025, during the last weeks of Luis Lacalle Pou's presidency and will remain in session throughout the five-year term of Yamandú Orsi's presidency.

Composition of the Chamber

Senators were elected in the 2024 general election in a single constituency. The Broad Front will have a majority of seats, which will be complemented by the vice president, who has the right to vote.

== Major events ==
- 15 February 2025: Elected Senators take their oaths and seats
- 1 March 2025: Inauguration of Yamandú Orsi as President of Uruguay

== Party summary ==
Party	Senate			
Party	Votes	%	Seats	+/–
Broad Front	1,071,826	43.86	16	+3
National Party	655,426	26.82	9	–1
Colorado Party	392,592	16.07	5	+1
Sovereign Identity	65,796	2.69	0	New
Open Cabildo	60,549	2.48	0	–3
Partido Ecologista Radical Intransigente	33,461	1.43	0	0
Constitutional Environmentalist Party	11 865	0.49	0	New
Independent Party	41,618	1.70	0	0
Popular Unity-Workers' Party	10 102	0.41	0	0
For Necessary Changes Party	3,183	0.14	0	New
Republican Advance Party	1,909	0.08	0	New
Invalid/blank votes	85,106	–	–	–
Total	2,443,901	100.00	30	0
Source: Corte Electoral

== Composition ==
Seat number	Senator	Party	Term		
Seat number	Senator	Party	From	To	Notes
President of the Senate	Alejandro Sánchez	Broad Front	15 February 2025	1 March 2025	President from the beginning of the legislature until the inauguration of the Vice President.
President of the Senate	Carolina Cosse	Broad Front	1 March 2025		She took office as Vice President of the Republic.
1st.	Alejandro Sánchez	Broad Front	—		As the top senator of the leading party, he temporarily presided over the Senate until Vice President Cosse's inauguration, then became Secretary of the Presidency.
1st.	Nicolás Viera	Broad Front	15 February 2025		Assumed seat as first alternate.
2nd	Blanca Rodríguez	Broad Front	15 February 2025		
3rd	Cristina Lustemberg	Broad Front	15 February 2025	1 March 2025	Resigned to become Minister of Public Health.
3rd	Patricia Kramer	Broad Front	1 March 2025		Assumed seat as first alternate.
4th	Daniel Caggiani	Broad Front	15 February 2025		
5th	Sandra Lazo	Broad Front	15 February 2025	1 March 2025	Resigned to become Minister of National Defense.
5th	Pedro Irigoin	Broad Front	1 March 2025	10 July 2025	Assumed seat as first alternate; later resigned to become Secretary General of the Intendancy of Canelones.
5th	Zulimar Ferreira	Broad Front	10 July 2025		Assumed seat as second alternate.
6th	Sebastián Sabini	Broad Front	15 February 2025		
7th	Cecilia Cairo	Broad Front	—		Resigned to become Minister of Housing and Territorial Planning of Uruguay.
7th	Bettiana Díaz	Broad Front	15 February 2025		Assumed seat as first alternate.
8th	Alfredo Fratti	Broad Front	15 February 2025	1 March 2025	Resigned to become Minister of Livestock, Agriculture and Fisheries.
8th	Eduardo Antonini	Broad Front	1 March 2025		Assumed seat as first alternate.
9th	Lucía Etcheverry	Broad Front	15 February 2025	1 March 2025	Resigned to become Minister of Transport and Public Works.
9th	Aníbal Pereyra	Broad Front	1 March 2025		Assumed seat as first alternate.
10th	Óscar Andrade	Broad Front	15 February 2025		
11th	Constanza Moreira	Broad Front	15 February 2025		
12th	Mario Bergara	Broad Front	15 February 2025	8 July 2025	Resigned to take office as Intendant of Montevideo.
12th	Liliam Kechichián	Broad Front	30 June 2025		Assumed seat as first alternate.
13th	Felipe Carballo Da Costa	Broad Front	15 February 2025		
14th	Gonzalo Civila	Broad Front	15 February 2025	1 March 2025	Resigned to become Minister of Social Development.
14th	Gustavo González Soto	Broad Front	1 March 2025		Assumed seat as first alternate.
15th	Edgardo Ortuño	Broad Front	15 February 2025	1 March 2025	Resigned to become Minister of Environment.
15th	Eduardo Brenta	Broad Front	1 March 2025		Assumed seat as first alternate.
16th	Carolina Cosse	Broad Front	—		Did not assume seat.
16th	Silvia Nane	Broad Front	15 February 2025	10 July 2025	Assumed seat as first alternate; later resigned to become Director of Sustainable and Smart Development of the Intendancy of Montevideo.
16th	Daniel Borbonet	Broad Front	10 July 2025		Assumed seat as second alternate.
17th	Javier García Duchini	National Party	15 February 2025		
18th	Sergio Botana	National Party	15 February 2025		
19th	María Fajardo	National Party	15 February 2025		
20th	Sebastián da Silva	National Party	15 February 2025		
21st	Luis Lacalle Pou	National Party	—		The 2020–2025 president resigned from his seat after being elected.
21st	Martín Lema	National Party	15 February 2025		Assumed seat as first alternate.
22nd	Álvaro Delgado	National Party	15 February 2025	5 August 2025	Resigned to become President of the National Party
22nd	José Luis Falero	National Party	8 July 2025		Assumed seat as first alternate.
23rd	Graciela Bianchi	National Party	15 February 2025		
24th	Nicolas Olivera Seiguerman	National Party	15 February 2025	8 July 2025	Resigned to take office as Intendant of Paysandú.
24th	Carlos Moreira	National Party	15 July 2025		Assumed seat as first alternate.
25th	Luis Alberto Héber	National Party	15 February 2025	14 October 2025	Resigned upon retirement.
25th	Rodrigo Blás	National Party	14 October 2025		Assumed seat as first alternate.
26th	Andrés Ojeda	Colorado Party	15 February 2025		
27th	Gustavo Zubía	Colorado Party	15 February 2025		
28th	Pedro Bordaberry	Colorado Party	15 February 2025		
29th	Tabaré Viera	Colorado Party	15 February 2025		
30th	Robert Silva	Colorado Party	15 February 2020		
Source: Members of the Senate
