= Ana Olivera =

Uruguayan professor and politician

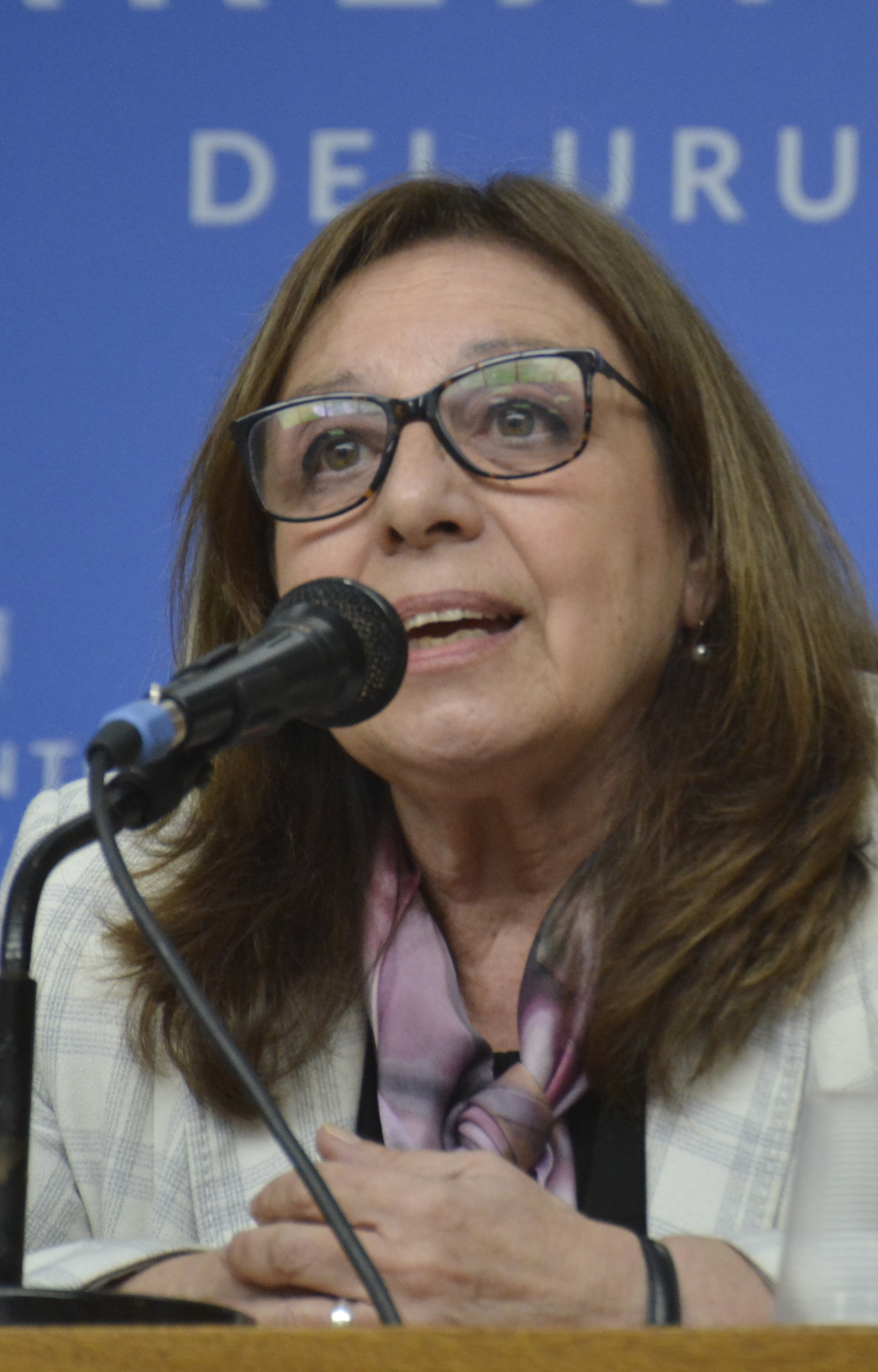
- Olivera in 2020

National Representative for Montevideo
- In office 15 February 2020 – 1 March 2026

Intendant of Montevideo
- In office 8 July 2010 – 9 July 2015
- Preceded by: Hyara Rodríguez
- Succeeded by: Daniel Martínez

Deputy Minister of Social Development of Uruguay
- In office 9 July 2015 – 14 February 2020
- Minister: Marina Arismendi
- Preceded by: Lauro Melendez
- Succeeded by: Armando Castaingdebat
- In office 1 March 2005 – 1 March 2010
- Minister: Marina Arismendi
- Preceded by: Creation of the position
- Succeeded by: Lauro Melendez

Personal details
- Born: 17 December 1953 (age 72) Montevideo, Uruguay
- Party: Communist Party of Uruguay; Broad Front
- Occupation: Politician, professor

Ana María Olivera Pessano (born 17 December 1953) is a Uruguayan politician of the Communist Party – Broad Front. She served as Intendant of Montevideo from 2010 to 2015, becoming the first woman to hold the position, and later as a National Representative in the 49th Legislature. She also served as Deputy Minister of Social Development in both administrations of President Tabaré Vázquez.

== Biography ==
=== Early life ===
She was born in Montevideo on 17 December 1953. At a very young age she joined the MLN-Tupamaros, so she had to go into exile in Cuba and later in France during the civic-military dictatorship. In France, he joined the Communist Party of Uruguay. Once the dictatorship ended, she returned to her native country and graduated as a secondary school French teacher.

=== Political career ===
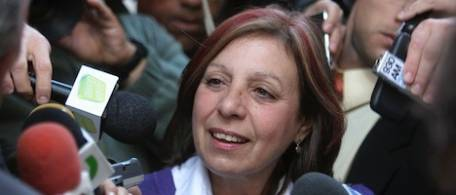
Ana Olivera in 2015.

In 1995 she was appointed Director of the Division of Local Administrations of the Municipality of Montevideo, by the then Intendant, Mariano Arana. In a new term of office of Arana, Olivera assumes the position of Director of the Western Region Division, until 2003. Again, in 2003 and until 2005 she assumes as General Director of the Decentralization Department, being in charge of the sectoral commissions of Youth, Children, Women, the Elderly and Social Management for the Disabled. In March 2005, after President Tabaré Vázquez took office, she was appointed Deputy Minister of Social Development. Back then, the officerholder was Marina Arismendi.

After José Mujica took office, he appointed her as Minister of Social Development. However, Olivera rejected the position when she was proclaimed as candidate by the Broad Front in Montevideo for the 2015 municipal election.

== See also ==
- Politics of Uruguay
