= 49th Legislature of the Chamber of Deputies of Uruguay =

49th Legislature of the Chamber of Deputies
←	48th	50th	→

Overview
- Legislative body: General Assembly
- Jurisdiction: Uruguay
- Meeting place: Montevideo
- Term: 15 February 2020 – 15 February 2025
- Election: 27 October 2019
- Website: parlamento.gub.uy

Chamber of Deputies
- Members: 99 deputies
- President: Ana Olivera (FA)
- Party control: Coalición Multicolor (PN, PC, PI, CA, PG)

Sessions
- 1st: 15 February 2020 – 15 December 2020
- 2nd: 1 March 2021 – 15 December 2021
- 3rd: 1 March 2022 – 15 December 2022
- 4th: 1 March 2023 – 15 December 2023
- 5th: 1 March 2024 – 15 September 2024

Composition of the Chamber

The Forty-Nine Legislature of the Chamber of Representatives of Uruguay was a meeting of the lower house of the Uruguayan General Assembly. It convened in Montevideo, on February 15, 2020, and ended on February 15, 2025, during the presidency of Luis Alberto Lacalle Pou. Deputies were elected in the 2019 general election in nineteen constituencies.

== Political parties ==
Party	Chamber of Representatives			
Party	Votes	%	Seats	+/–
Broad Front	949,376	40.49	42	–8
National Party	696,452	29.70	30	–2
Colorado Party	300,177	12.80	13	0
Open Cabildo	268,736	11.46	11	New
Partido Ecologista Radical Intransigente	33,461	1.43	1	+1
Party of the Folk	26,313	1.12	1	New
Independent Party	23,580	1.01	1	–2
Popular Unity	19,728	0.84	0	–1
Green Animalist Party	19,392	0.83	0	New
Digital Party	6,363	0.27	0	New
Workers' Party	1,387	0.06	0	0
Invalid/blank votes	88,399	–	–	–
Total	2,433,364	100	99	0
Registered voters/turnout	2,699,978	90.13	–	–
Source: Corte Electoral; El País

== Members ==
=== Artigas ===
- Nicolás Lorenzo (FA)
- Valentina dos Santos (PN)

=== Canelones ===
- Alfonso Lereté (PN)
- Álvaro Dastugue (PN)
- Álvaro Perrone (CA)
- Carlos Testa (CA)
- Javier Radiccioni (PN)
- Jorge Alvear González (PC)
- José Carlos Mahía (FA)
- Lucía Etcheverry (FA)
- Nelson Larzábal (FA)
- Orquídea Minetti (FA)
- Pedro Irigoin (FA)
- Sebastián Andújar (PN)
- Sebastián Sabini (FA)
- Ubaldo Aíta (FA)
- Walter Cervini (PC)

=== Cerro Largo ===
- Alfredo Fratti (FA)
- Christian Morel (PN)
- Wilman Caballero (CA)

=== Colonia ===
- Nibia Reisch (PN)
- Nicolás Viera (FA)
- Mario Enrique Colman (PN)

=== Durazno ===
- Benjamín Irazábal (PN)
- Martín Tierno (FA)

=== Flores ===
- Juan Federico Ruiz (FA)
- Laura Burgoa (PN)

=== Florida ===
- Carlos Enciso (PN)
- Carlos Rodríguez Gálvez (FA)

=== Lavalleja ===
- Javier Umpiérrez (FA)
- Mario García (PN)

=== Maldonado ===
- Diego Echeverría (PN)
- Eduardo Antonini (FA)
- Eduardo Elinger (PC)
- Rodrigo Blás (PN)
- Sebastián Cal (CA)

=== Montevideo ===
- Alejandro Sánchez Pereira (FA)
- Álvaro Viviano (PN)
- Ana Olivera (FA)
- Andrés Abt (PN)
- Bettiana Díaz (FA)
- Carlos Varela Nestier (FA)
- Cecilia Cairo (FA)
- César Vega (PERI)
- Claudia Hugo (FA)
- Conrado Rodríguez (PC)
- Cristina Lustemberg (FA)
- Daniel Caggiani (FA)
- Daniel Gerhard (FA)
- Daniel Peña Fernández (PC)
- Eduardo Lust (CA)
- Elsa Capillera (CA)
- Felipe Carballo (FA)
- Felipe Schipani (PC)
- Gabriel Gianoli (PN)
- Gabriel Otero (FA)
- Gabriela Barreiro (FA)
- Gonzalo Civila (FA)
- Gerardo Núñez (FA)
- Gonzalo Mujica (PN)
- Gustavo Olmos (FA)
- Gustavo Zubía (PC)
- Héctor Martín Sodano (CA)
- Iván Posada (PI)
- Juan Martín Rodríguez (PN)
- Lilián Galán (FA)
- Martín Lema (PN)
- María Eugenia Roselló (PC)
- Héctor Martín Sodano (FA)
- Ope Pasquet (PC)
- Pedro Jisdonián (PN)
- Pablo Viana (PN)
- Rodrigo Goñi Reyes (PN)
- Silvana Pérez Bonavita (CA)
- Susana Pereyra (FA)
