= Armando Castaingdebat =

Uruguayan veterinarian and political figure

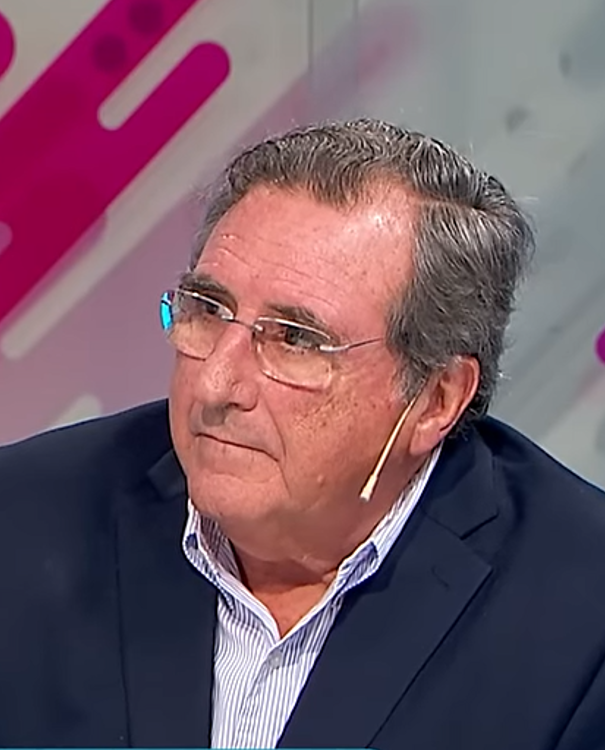

Minister of National Defense of Uruguay
- In office 4 March 2024 – 1 March 2025
- President: Luis Alberto Lacalle Pou
- Preceded by: Javier García Duchini
- Succeeded by: Sandra Lazo

Deputy Minister of Social Development of Uruguay
- In office 1 March 2020 – 3 May 2021
- President: Luis Alberto Lacalle Pou
- Preceded by: Ana Olivera
- Succeeded by: Andrea Brugman

Representative of Uruguay for Flores
- In office 15 February 2015 – 15 February 2020

Intendant of Flores Department
- In office 8 July 2010 – 26 July 2014
- Preceded by: Gerardo Sánchez Listur
- Succeeded by: Beatriz Ríos
- In office 7 July 2005 – 9 February 2010
- Preceded by: Carlos Mazzulo
- Succeeded by: Gerardo Sánchez Listur

Personal details
- Born: 25 October 1959 (age 66) Trinidad, Uruguay
- Party: National Party
- Education: University of the Republic
- Occupation: Veterinarian; politician

Armando Irineo Castaingdebat Colombo (born 25 October 1959) is a Uruguayan politician who served as Minister of National Defense from March 4, 2024 to March 1, 2025 under President Luis Lacalle Pou. A member of the National Party, he previously served as Deputy Minister of Social Development from 2020 to 2021, as National Representative from 2015 to 2020 and as mayor (intendente) of the Flores Department from 2005 to 2014.

Graduated from the University of the Republic with a veterinary medicine degree, he has been a member of the National Party since the late 1980s. A significant factor in his political career has been the sizeable agricultural interests which are present in the economic and labour-related life of Flores Department.

== Political career ==
In the 2005 municipal elections, Walter Echeverría was elected intendant of Flores, however, he died before he took office. Therefore, Castaingdebat took over as the first substitute. He was reelected to the office in the 2010 election.

He served as President of the National Congress of Mayors between 2013 and 2014. He was elected for the Chamber of Representatives for the 48th Legislature in the 2014 general election.

Castaingdebat is mayor (intendente) of the Flores Department of Uruguay. By a large margin, this is the most sparsely populated of the country's 19 departments.

After Luis Lacalle Pou's victory in the 2019 general election, he was appointed Deputy Minister of Social Development, accompanied by Pablo Bartol, who serves as Minister. On May 3, 2021, he resigned from his post, after his son-in-law, Martín Lema, took office as minister.

== Other activities ==
In the University Elections of the University of the Republic, held on May 4, 2016, he was elected as a substitute in the Cloister of the Veterinary School in the order of graduates and under the slogan Corriente Gremial Universitaria - Egresados.

On 21 August 2018, FIFA appointed a normalisation committee for the Uruguayan Football Association (AUF). Three persons were put in charge: Castaingdebat, Senator Pedro Bordaberry, and former professional association football player Andrés Scotti.

== Personal life ==
He has three children, including politician Armando Castaingdebat Ramírez and Florencia Castaingdebat, Martín Lema's wife.

== See also ==
- Departments of Uruguay
- Politics of Uruguay
- Flores Department#Notable people
