= María Julia Muñoz =

Uruguayan doctor in medicine and politician

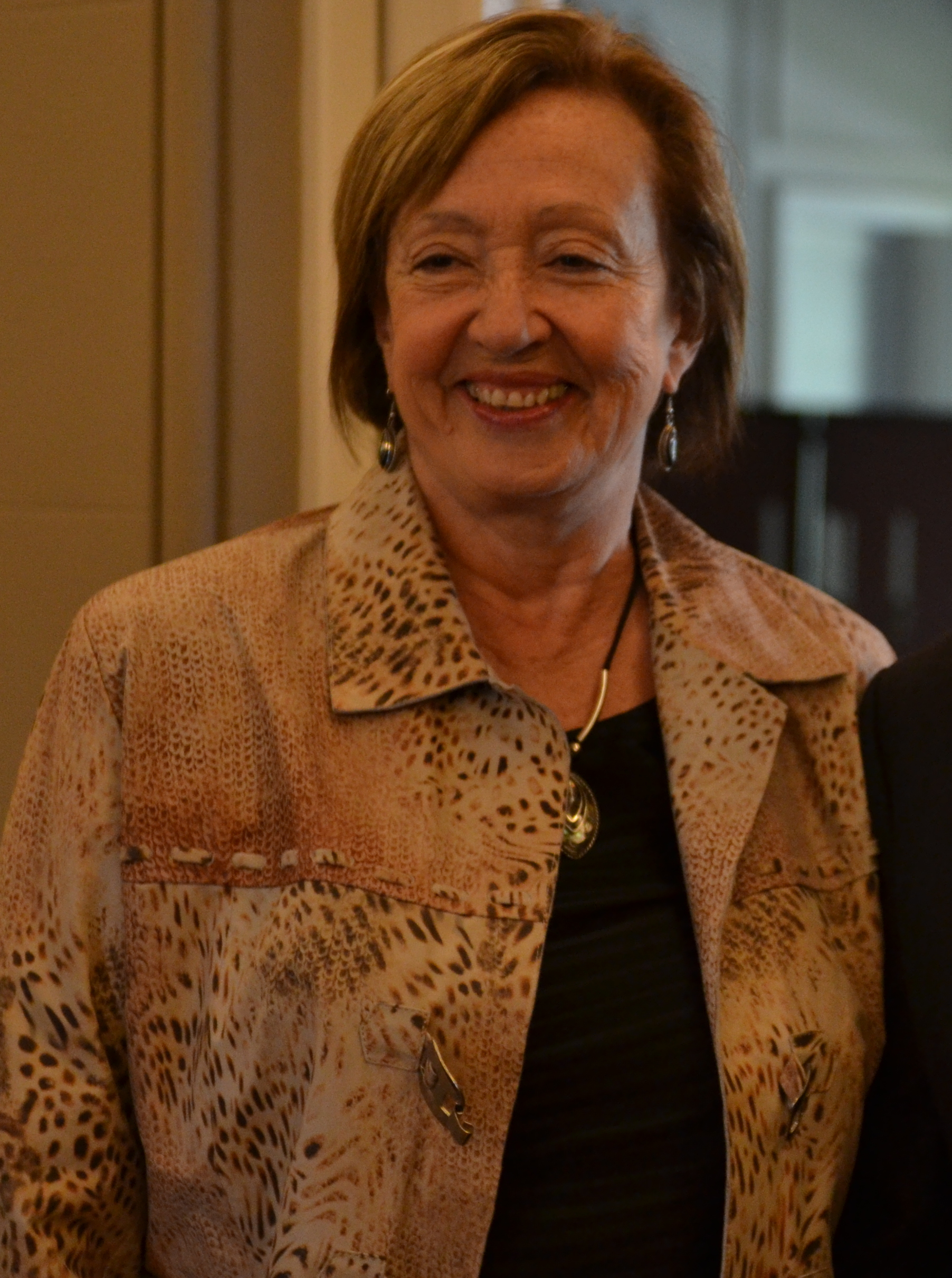

Minister of Education and Culture of Uruguay
- In office 1 March 2015 – 29 February 2020
- President: Tabaré Vázquez
- Preceded by: Ricardo Ehrlich
- Succeeded by: Pablo Da Silveira

Minister of Public Health
- In office 1 March 2005 – 1 March 2010
- President: Tabare Vasquez
- Preceded by: Conrado Bonilla
- Succeeded by: Daniel Olesker

General Secretary of the Municipality of Montevideo
- In office 5 May 1995 – 24 May 2004

Personal details
- Born: María Julia Muñoz; 18 October 1950 (age 75) Montevideo, Uruguay
- Party: Socialist Party
- Other political affiliations: Broad Front
- Education: University of the Republic

María Julia Muñoz (born February 3, 1950) is a Uruguayan doctor in medicine and politician. She served as Minister of Public Health from 2005 to 2010 and as Minister of Education and Culture between 2015 and 2020.

== Biography ==
María Julia Muñoz graduated in 1975 with a medical degree and specialized in infectious diseases in 1980. In 1983 she received the title of specialist in Public Health, and six years later, in 1989, the title of specialist in Epidemiology. For nearly 20 years, she was an educator in the Department of Preventative and Social Medicine within the College of Medicine at the Universidad de la República, in Montevideo, Uruguay. During her teaching career, she became an Assistant Professor before leaving to dedicate herself to politics.

=== Entrance in politics ===
Muñoz has served in politics since the age of 16 and joined the Frente Amplio, or Broad Front, a center-left political party of Uruguay. Within the Broad Front, she originally participated in the Vertiente Artiguista, a social democratic political sector, which was led by the politician and architect Mariano Arana, who was also the former Secretary of Housing, Intendant of Montevideo, and Senator of the Republic. In the internal elections of 2009, Muñoz formed her own approval list, including the presidential candidate Marcos Carámbula, alongside Víctor Rossi.

== Political career ==
=== Intendancy of Montevideo ===
In 1990, she began working in the Municipal City Council of Montevideo, in charge of Mayor Tabaré Vázquez, in succession as Directora de División de Alimentación, Prosecretaria General and Directora General de Recursos Humanos y Materiales.

When Mariano Arana worked as Mayor during 1995–2004, Muñoz worked as Secretary General of the Mayorship (Secretaria General de la Intendencia).

In August 2011, the district attorney Diego Pérez asked for the imprisonment of Muñez, arguing that under her direction as Secretary General of the Mayorship of Montevideo, she facilitated the actions carried out by the Director de Casinos, Juan Carlos Bengoa, who in turn was accused in 2007. The request was, however, dismissed just three months later (in November 2011) by the judge Fanny Canessa under the consideration that there was not sufficient evidence that supported the accusation.

=== Ministration in Public Health ===
In May 2004, the secretary assumed the position of Gerente General of the most important benefit society of Uruguay (approximately 260,000 members), the CASMU, also known as the Centro de Asistencia del Sindicato Médico del Uruguay. Muñoz was in charge of CASMU until 2005 when the elected president Tabaré Vázquez turned his position as Minister for Public Health over to Muñoz, who accepted the position even though it held a lower salary than that of Gerente General of CASMU. Muñoz therefore became the first woman in control of this position and worked the five years of the gubernatorial period, just as did all of her consultant and director counterparts. During these five years under her leadership, she both began and completed the reform of Uruguay's Health System.

On November 13, 2008 she supported the decision of President Vázquez to veto a law, approved by the Parliament, that decriminalized abortion.

=== Honorary Commission of Fighting against Cancer ===
On the first of April in 2011, Muñoz assumed the title of the Comisión Honoraria de Lucha contra el Cáncer, or the Honorary Commission of Fighting against Cancer, taking the place of Óscar Magurno.

=== Second Presidency of Vázquez ===
In December 2014, after securing the election of Tabaré Vázquez for another presidency, it was announced that Muñoz would be at the forefront of the Ministry of Education and Culture (Ministerio de Educación y Cultura), the position which she still holds today.

Predecessor:	Minister of Public Health	Successor:
Conrado Bonilla	2005-2010	Daniel Olesker
