= 2025 Uruguayan municipal elections =

Local election

- 11 May 2025
- 19 intendants, 589 ediles, 136 mayors, and 544 local councilors
- Turnout: 2,366,874 (86.88%) ▲1 pp
Party	Leader	Vote %	Seats	+/–
National Party	Luis Lacalle Pou	23.84	13	−2
Broad Front	Yamandú Orsi	40.60	4	+1
Republican Coalition	Luis Lacalle Pou	23.31	1	New
Colorado Party	Andrés Ojeda	4.09	1	0
This lists parties that won seats. See the complete results below.

Uruguay held local government elections on 11 May, 2025, to elect the intendente and departmental councils of the 19 departments (first-lever administrative divisions of Uruguay) as well as 136 local governments. Across the country, 19 intendants, 589 ediles, 136 mayors and 544 local councilors will be elected.

== Background ==
In the municipal elections of September 2020, the National Party won 15 departments, the Broad Front won 3 departments, and the Colorado Party won 1 department.

=== Canelones ===
Canelones has been held by the Broad Front coalition since 2005. Yamandú Orsi has been elected President, so other candidates are coming up. Francisco Legnani has already been proposed.

=== Montevideo ===
There will be an ad-hoc party, Republican Coalition, made up of politicians from the National Party, Colorado Party, Independent Party, and Cabildo Abierto parties. Martín Lema has already been proposed as candidate.

== See also ==
- 2024 Uruguayan general election
