= Pablo Bartol =

Uruguayan social entrepreneur, lecturer and politician

Minister of Social Development of Uruguay
- In office 1 March 2020 – 1 May 2021
- President: Luis Alberto Lacalle Pou
- Preceded by: Marina Arismendi
- Succeeded by: Martín Lema

Personal details
- Born: 20 November 1965 (age 60)
- Party: National Party
- Education: University of the Republic; University of Montevideo; University of Navarra

Pablo Bartol (born 20 November 1965) is an Uruguayan social entrepreneur, lecturer and politician who served as Minister of Social Development from March 1, 2020 to May 1, 2021.

Graduated from the University of the Republic in 1989, he has a Bachelor's Degree in International Relations and a Master's in Business Administration and Organizational Government from the University of Montevideo and the University of Navarra, respectively.

== Biography ==
=== Career ===
Bartol served as professor of politics at the Business School of the University of Montevideo. In 1997 he founded the Los Pinos Educational Center in Casavalle and directed this institution for 21 years where he developed educational and job training programs. In 2011 Los Pinos received the National Innovation Award from the National Agency for Research and Innovation (ANII) and in 2016 it became the Los Pinos Foundation. In 2009, he began to receive institutional support from Boys & Girls Clubs of America, the most important American organization in school support programs in critical areas of the USA. He has also participated in training and exchange programs in Chile, Spain and Finland.

Before his activity in social organizations he worked for the media. From 1995 to 1998 he served as Project Manager for the newspaper El Observador. And he was also a columnist for the newspaper El País between 1990 and 1993.

He began his academic life in 2009 as professor of Corporate Social Responsibility at the Institute of Business Studies at the University of Montevideo. Since 2014 he was in charge of the Leadership course for the participants of the Master in Business Management.

=== Minister of Social Development ===
Since March 1, 2020 he serves as Minister of Social Development, during the administration of Luis Alberto Lacalle Pou. His Deputy Minister is Armando Castaingdebat (Former Intendant of the Flores Department) and the Director General of the Secretariat is the attorney Nicolás Martinelli.

Bartol promised to move the office of the ministry to Casavalle, one of the poorest barrios in Montevideo, the capital of Uruguay, buy did not do it.

On May 1, 2021, President Lacalle Pou announced that Bartol had been removed from office, because the "health, labor, social and educational consequences of the pandemic will demand a strong political and territorial articulation mark"; and he expressed his appreciation for his "dedication and commitment to serving the country." Bartol had no political party ties until his approach to Lacalle Pou's team. In addition, the president announced that Martín Lema would be the new head of the portfolio.
