= Ana María Vignoli =

Former minister of Social Development

- Born: 27 July 1945 (age 80); Montevideo
- Predecessor: Marina Arismendi
- Successor: Daniel Olesker
- Political party: Broad Front

Ana María Vignoli or Ana Maria Vignoli (born 27 July 1945) is an Uruguayan former minister of Social Development.

== Life ==
Vignoli was born in Montevideo in 1945. During the dictatorship she was exiled in 1973 and she lived in Sweden until 1984.

In March 2010 she became the Minister of Social Development after she was appointed by President José Mujica. He and Vignoli are members of the Broad Front political party. The following July she was replaced by Daniel Olesker.
