= Cecilia Bottino =

Uruguayan lawyer and politician

President of the Chamber of Representatives of Uruguay
- In office 1 March 2019 – 15 February 2020
- Preceded by: Jorge Gandini
- Succeeded by: Martín Lema

Representative of Uruguay for Paysandú
- Incumbent
- Assumed office 15 February 2015

Personal details
- Born: María Cecilia Bottino Fiuri; 19 October 1968 (age 57) Paysandú, Uruguay
- Party: Movement of Popular Participation
- Other political affiliations: Broad Front
- Education: University of the Republic

María Cecilia Bottino Fiuri (born 19 October 1968) is a Uruguayan lawyer and politician of the Movement of Popular Participation – Broad Front. Since February 15, 2015 she serves as Representative for Paysandú Department. Between 2019 and 2020 she served as President of the Chamber of Representatives of Uruguay.

Graduated from the University of the Republic as a Doctor in Law and Social Sciences in 1993, she has been fully dedicated to politics since 2010.

== Biography ==
=== Early life ===
She was born in the City of Paysandú and completed her primary studies at the "Padre Lamas" School. She attended Liceo No. 1 and No. 2 of her hometown.

=== Political activity ===
Her beginnings in political militancy were in 1983, in the Broad Front as an independent militant. In 2005 she entered the MPP, in which she still continues. During the 47th Legislature of the Chamber of Deputies (2010-2015) she was a substitute for the Representative for Paysandú Gustavo Rombys. Subsequently, in the national elections that were held in October 2014, Bottino led the list of Space 609 in Paysandú and was elected national representative by this department, being one of the 14 women who make up the Chamber of Representatives.

In the 2019 general election, Bottino was re-elected National Representative for the new legislature (2020-2025).
