= Daniel Olesker =

Uruguayan economist and politician

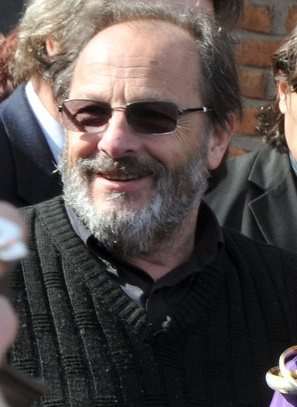

Senator of Uruguay
- Incumbent
- Assumed office February 15, 2020

Minister of Social Development of Uruguay
- In office July 19, 2011 – 28 February 2015
- President: Jose Mujica
- Preceded by: Ana María Vignoli
- Succeeded by: Marina Arismendi

Minister of Public Health of Uruguay
- In office March 1, 2010 – July 19, 2011
- President: Jose Mujica
- Preceded by: María Julia Muñoz
- Succeeded by: Jorge Enrique Venegas

Personal details
- Born: 23 August 1952 (age 74) Montevideo, Uruguay
- Party: Socialist Party; Broad Front
- Education: University of the Republic; Université catholique de Louvain

Daniel Olesker (born August 23, 1952 in Montevideo) is an Uruguayan politician of the Socialist Party – Broad Front. He served as Minister of Social Development from 2011 to 2015 and as Minister of Public Health between 2010 and 2011. Since February 15, 2020, he has served as Senator of the Republic.

== Biography ==
=== Early life and education ===
He was born to a Jewish family on August 23, 1952. His father, Bernardo Olesker was honorary president of the Zionist Organization of Uruguay.

Studied economy at the University of the Republic but did not graduate. Began his political militancy at age 18, in the March 26 Movement, a left-leaning Marxist–Leninist group. Due to his political activities, he was imprisoned for three and a half years. He lived in Belgium, where he completed a postgraduate degree at the Université catholique de Louvain.

=== Career ===
He teaches grade 5 Faculty of Economics and holder of the area of Labor Economics. He is a member of the Network of World Economy, Political Economy Workshop and Working Group on Global Economy of the Latin American Council of Science, where he also teaches courses in labor economics.

He served as Minister of Social Development from 2011 to 2015, during the administration of José Mujica. Previously he served as Minister of Public Health (2010-2011). In the 2019 general election, he was elected Senator of the Republic for the 49th Legislature, a position he accessed on February 15, 2020.

== Bibliography ==
- Daniel Olesker (2009). Crecimiento e inclusión: logros del gobierno frenteamplista. Ediciones Trilce. ISBN 978-9974-32-518-0.
