= Sandra Lazo =

Uruguayan radio announcer and politician

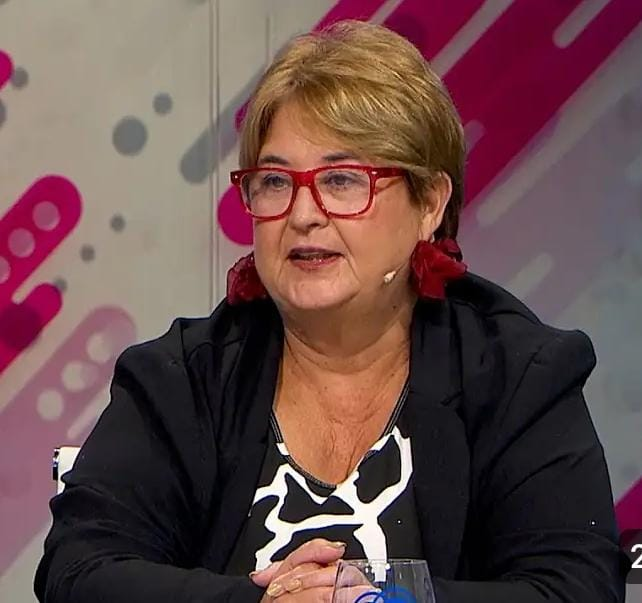

Minister of Defence
- Incumbent
- Assumed office 1 March 2025
- President: Yamandú Orsi
- Preceded by: Armando Castaingdebat

Personal details
- Born: April 12, 1967 (age 59) Montevideo, Uruguay
- Party: Broad Front

Sandra Maria Lazo (born 12 April 1967) is a Uruguayan politician who has served as the country's Minister of Defense since March 2025.

== Education and early life ==
Sandra Maria Lazo was born in Montevideo on 12 April 1967. She studied at the Ravel conservatory, graduating as a guitar and solfeggio teacher.

== Career ==
Lazo worked as a radio announcer for FM Coronilla in Rocha and FM Oceanica in Punta del Este. She is also a tango singer, and performed annually at the "Come Sing to Gardel" contest held in Tacuarembó.

=== Political career ===
Lazo joined the Union of Communist Youth before becoming a member of the Movement of Popular Participation in 1989. In 2005, she was appointed Director of Communication for the first Broad Front government in Rocha. She entered Parliament as an alternate for representative Amaury de los Santos in 2010. In 2015, she became an alternate for senator Andrés Berterreche, taking his seat permanently when he was appointed Undersecretary of Defense on 4 April 2019. She served on the committees for Population, Development and Inclusion, Human Rights, Equity and Gender, Defense, and Environment and Departmental and Municipal Affairs.

In the 2019 parliamentary elections, Lazo was elected Senator for the 2020-2025 term. She became known publicly for her strong defense of victims of the civic-military dictatorship which had ruled the country until 1985, actively pushing for prosecution for those responsible. In 2024, she said in parliament, "democracy will be healthier the day all families know where their disappeared detainees are."

Lazo has participated in international studies and delegations since 2012, including contributing to the Colombian peace process between FARC and the government, and engaging with President of Honduras, Xiomara Castro.

In December 2024, President-elect Yamandú Orsi announced Lazo as the future Minister of National Defense. She commenced in the role on 1 March 2025. She is the second woman to hold the role after Azucena Berrutti. Under her leadership, the Armed Forces of Uruguay has around 15,200 personnel in the Army, 4,600 in the Navy, and 2.600 in the Air Force. On her appointment, she said she was "not here to reinvent the wheel" and would seek to strengthen rather than innovate.

== Personal life ==
Lazo is married to Orfilio "Chaco" Cardoso, a racing commentator. She lives in San Miguel in Rocha and identifies as a feminist.
