= Fernando Mattos Costa =

Uruguayan politician and businessman (born 1958)

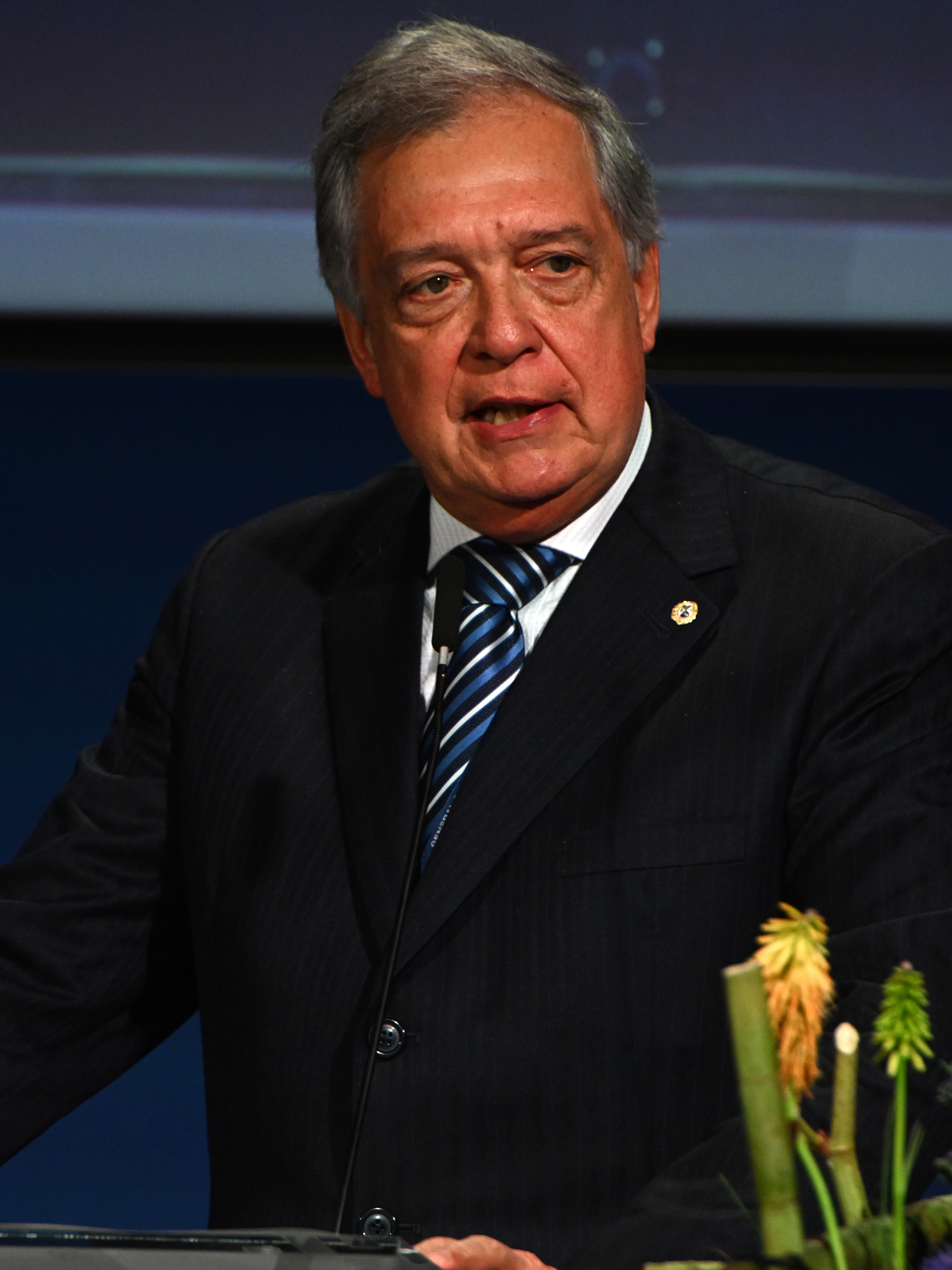
- Mattos Costa in 2022

Minister of Livestock, Agriculture, and Fisheries of Uruguay
- In office 27 June 2021 – 1 March 2025
- President: Luis Alberto Lacalle Pou
- Preceded by: Carlos María Uriarte

Personal details
- Born: Fernando Mattos Costa; 9 December 1958 (age 67) Montevideo, Uruguay
- Party: Colorado Party
- Occupation: Agronomist; businessman; politician

Fernando Mattos Costa (born 9 December 1958) is a Uruguayan agronomist, businessman and politician of the Colorado Party (PC) who served as Minister of Livestock, Agriculture, and Fisheries under President Luis Lacalle Pou.

== Early life and education ==
Mattos Costa was born in 1958 in Montevideo, the son of two ranchers. His uncle Carlos Mattos Moglia served as Minister of Agriculture and Fisheries from 1981 to 1985. He attended the Federal University of Rio Grande do Sul, Brazil, graduating in 1981 as an agricultural engineer. In 1985 he revalidated his degree at the University of the Republic in Uruguay.

== Career ==
After graduating from university in Brazil, during the 1980s Mattos Costa worked in meatpacking plants in Porto Alegre and held management positions. Upon his return to Uruguay, he began working as a rancher in the departments of Cerro Largo and Tacuarembó.

Between 2004 and 2006 he served as president of the Rural Association of Uruguay (ARU), and also served as its delegate to the National Meat Institute (INAC) and as member of its board of directors.

In March 2020, he was appointed president of the National Meat Institute in the administration of President Luis Lacalle Pou. On June 27, 2021, he was appointed Minister of Livestock, Agriculture and Fisheries, after the resignation of Carlos María Uriarte.
