= Marina Arismendi =

Uruguayan politician (born 1949)

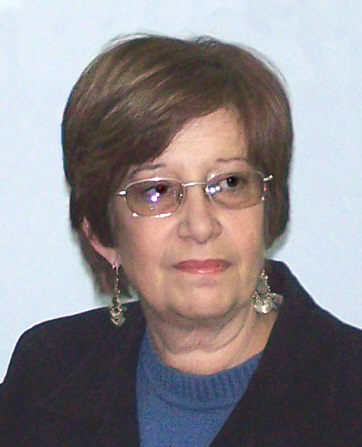

1st and 4th Minister of Social Development
- In office 1 March 2015 – 29 February 2020
- President: Tabare Vasquez
- Preceded by: Daniel Olesker
- Succeeded by: Pablo Bartol
- In office 21 March 2005 – 1 March 2010
- Preceded by: Inaugural Holder
- Succeeded by: Ana María Vignoli
- In office 1992–2006
- President: Luis Alberto Lacalle; Julio María Sanguinetti; Jorge Batlle; Tabaré Vázquez
- Preceded by: Jaime Pérez
- Succeeded by: Eduardo Lorier
- President: Tabare Vasquez

Personal details
- Born: Ana Marina Arismendi Dubinsky; 30 May 1949 (age 76) Montevideo, Uruguay
- Party: Broad Front; Communist Party

Ana Marina Arismendi Dubinsky (born 30 May 1949, Montevideo) is an Uruguayan teacher and politician of the Communist Party. She served as Minister of Social Development from 2005 to 2010, and from 2015 to 2020, in the first and second government of President Tabaré Vázquez.

== Biography ==
Arismendi was born on 30 May 1949, the daughter of Rodney Arismendi, a historic leader of the Communist Party and founder of the Broad Front, and Rosa Dubinsky.

In the early years of her adolescence she joined the Union of Communist Youth and the Committee of Support to the Cuban Revolution "Camilo Cienfuegos".

During the civic-military dictatorship she went into exile to East Germany, where she obtained a Bachelor of Social Science.

== Political career ==
In 1990, she was elected member of the Central Committee of the Communist Party for its XXII Congress. She joined the Collective General Secretariat in 1992, and until 2006 she served as General Secretary of the party, after the resignation of Jaime Pérez. She was part of the Broad Front Political Board between 1992 and 1999.

In the 1994 general election, she was elected Senator. In the following elections, from 1999 and 2004 she was re-elected. In 2005, after Tabaré Vázquez assumed the position of President of Uruguay, she was appointed minister of the newly created Ministry of Social Development.

== See also ==
- List of political families#Uruguay
