= Pablo Da Silveira =

Uruguayan writer, philosopher and politician

Pablo da Silveira
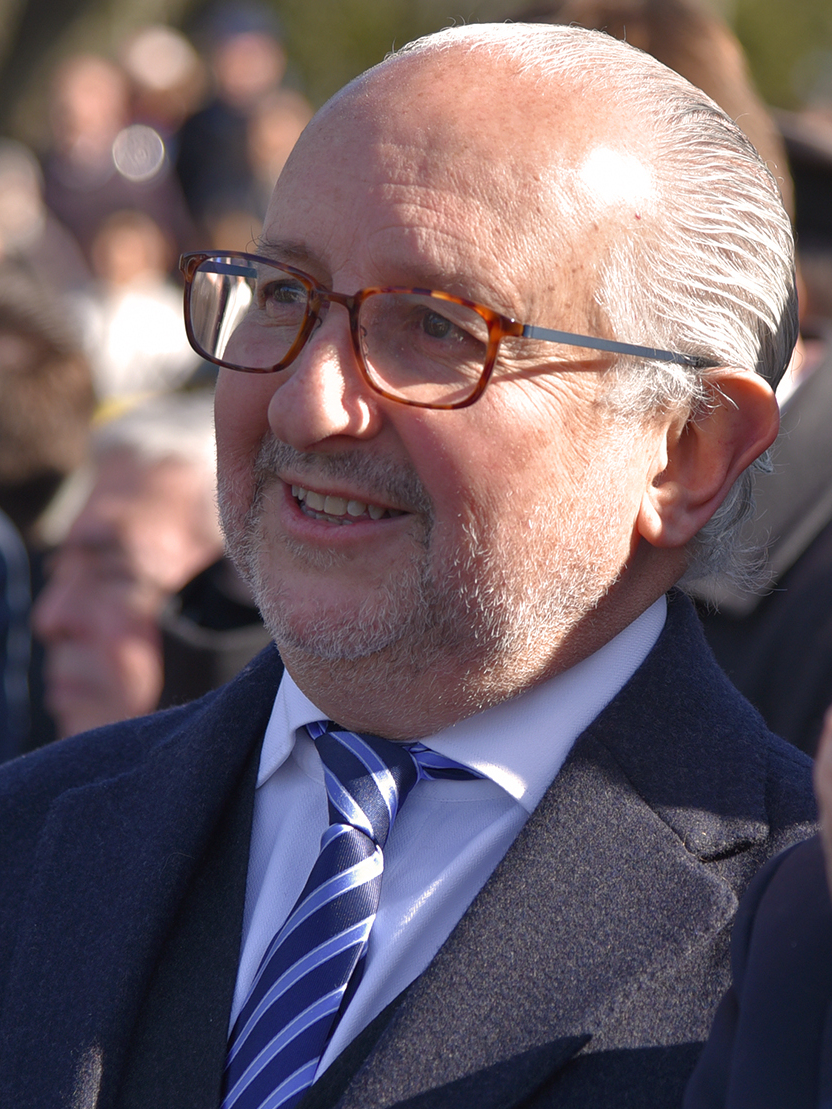
- Pablo da Silveira in 2020.

Minister of Education and Culture of Uruguay
- In office 1 March 2020 – 1 March 2025
- President: Luis Alberto Lacalle Pou
- Preceded by: María Julia Muñoz
- Succeeded by: José Carlos Mahía

Personal details
- Born: 21 September 1962 (age 63) Montevideo, Uruguay
- Party: National Party
- Education: Université catholique de Louvain

Pablo da Silveira García (born 21 September 1962) is a Uruguayan writer, lecturer, philosopher, and politician of the National Party, who served as Minister of Education and Culture from 2020 to 2025.

== Biography ==
=== Education ===
Graduated from the Université Catholique de Louvain, he has a PhD in Philosophy. In addition, he served as a researcher at the same university.

=== Career ===
He served as a lecturer of Political Philosophy and Director of the Government of Education Program at the Catholic University of Uruguay and in some in America and Europe. He is the co-founder of the Liceo Impulso, along with Ernesto Talvi. At the Catholic University, he teaches Political Philosophy and directs the Government of Education Program.

Author of La Segunda Reforma, a publication in which he opposes Germán Rama's proposal from the right, as it is based on public education, and in which he suggests the transfer of public resources to private education. This is the vision that Da Silveira holds so far and the one that has given it the greatest public significance.

=== Political career ===
During the 2019 election campaign, Da Silveira served as advisor to candidate Luis Lacalle Pou on education policies. On December 16, 2019, after the victory of Lacalle Pou, he was announced as Minister of Education and Culture, a position he assumed on March 1, 2020. His Deputy Minister is Ana Ribeiro.
