= Nicolás Martinelli =

Uruguayan lawyer and politician (born 1982)

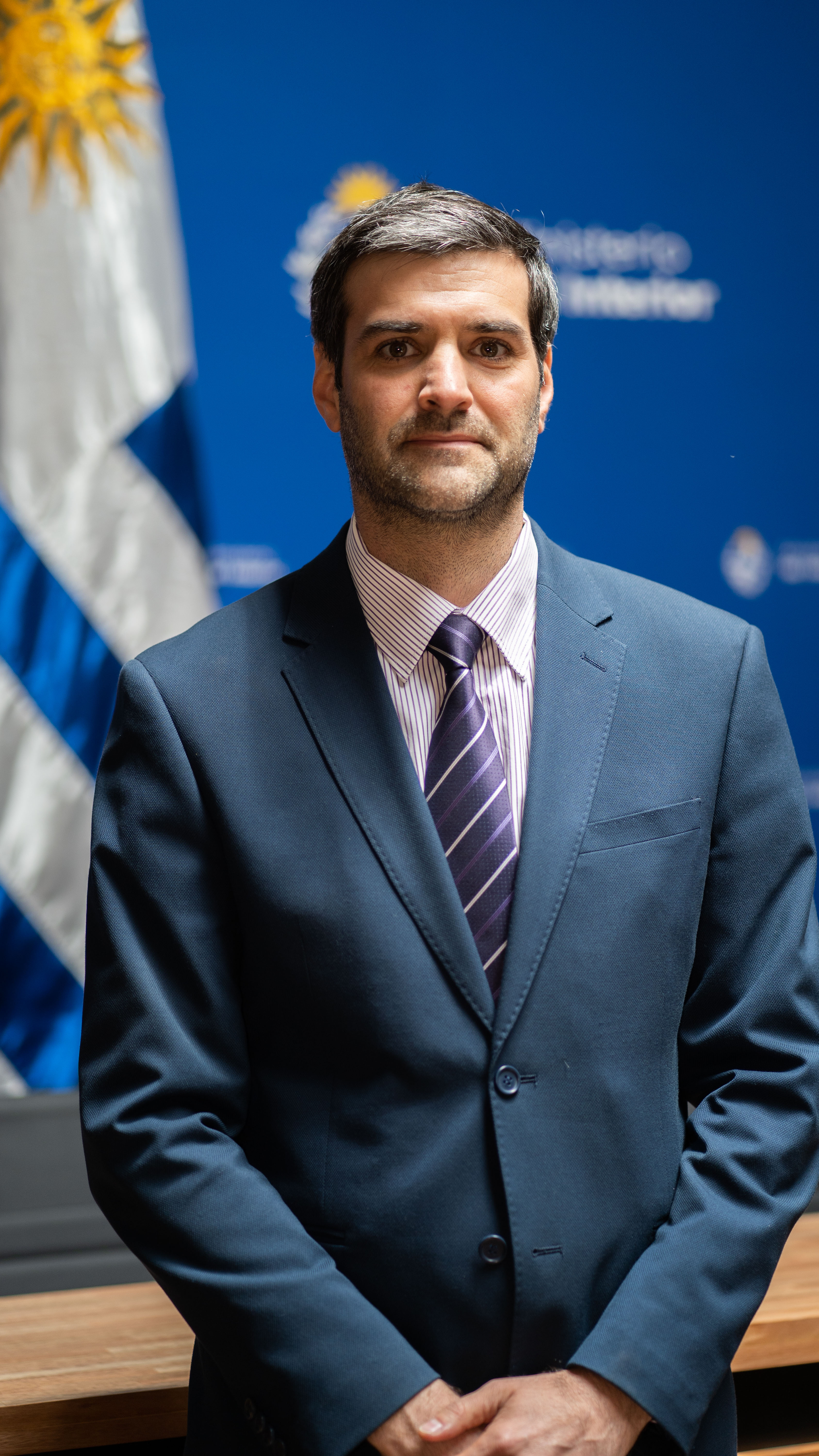

Minister of the Interior of Uruguay
- In office 6 November 2023 – 1 March 2025
- President: Luis Alberto Lacalle Pou
- Preceded by: Luis Alberto Héber
- Succeeded by: Carlos Negro

Personal details
- Born: Nicolás José Martinelli Waksman; 2 January 1982 (age 44) Montevideo, Uruguay
- Party: National Party
- Education: University of the Republic
- Occupation: Lawyer; politician

Nicolás José Martinelli Waksman (born January 2, 1982) is a Uruguayan lawyer and politician of the National Party who served as Minister of the Interior from 2023 to 2025 under President Luis Lacalle Pou.

== Early life and education ==
Martinelli Waksman was born on January 2, 1982, in Montevideo.

He obtained a law degree from the University of the Republic. He clerked at the Posadas, Posadas y Vecino firm as a lawyer in the corporate and litigation sector from 2007 to 2010, and at the Teyma-Abengoa law firm between 2013 and 2015.

== Political career ==
=== Early political career ===
Martinelli joined the National Party while studying at university. In 2008 he co-founded the Aire Fresco sector – Lista 404, together with Martín Lema, José Luis Satdjián and Luis Lacalle Pou.

In the 2010 municipal elections he unsuccessfully ran for mayor of Municipality E of the Montevideo Department, but was nevertheless elected as a councilor of the Municipality. In 2011 he was a member of the commission led by the then president of the Chamber of Representatives Luis Lacalle Pou, which was in charge of removing obsolete, repealed or unregulated laws from the Uruguayan legal system.

In 2014 he was elected alternate National Representative in the 48th Legislature (2015-2020). He also served as coordinator of the Todos sector.
