= Gonzalo Civila =

Uruguayan professor and politician

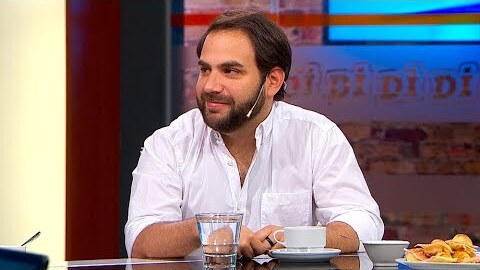
Gonzalo Civila in 2020

Gonzalo Martín Civila López (Montevideo, December 6, 1984) is a Uruguayan professor and politician who belongs to the Socialist Party of Uruguay (PS). Since March 1, 2025 he has been Minister of Social Development.

== Early life and education ==
Since the age of 15, he has been involved in community activities in settlements in Montevideo and in various socio-educational projects.

He graduated as a philosophy teacher from the Artigas Teachers' Institute (IPA) in 2006. He also completed advanced studies in philosophy (research option) at the Faculty of Letters and Educational Sciences of the University of the Republic.

== Political offices ==
Gonzalo Civila was a member of the Broad Front and the Socialist Party since his adolescence

In March 2019 he was elected Secretary General of the Socialist Party. In 2022 he was reelected Secretary General.

In December 2024, Civila was announced by President-elect Yamandú Orsi as the future Minister of Social Development.
