= Javier García (Uruguayan politician) =

Uruguayan politician and physician

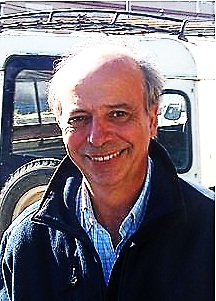

Senator of Uruguay
- Incumbent
- Assumed office 4 March 2024
- In office 15 February 2015 – 29 February 2020

Minister of Defense of Uruguay
- In office 1 March 2020 – 4 March 2024
- President: Luis Lacalle Pou
- Preceded by: José Bayardi
- Succeeded by: Armando Castaingdebat

Representative of Uruguay for Montevideo
- In office 15 February 2005 – 15 February 2015
- In office 1995–2000

Personal details
- Born: Javier Fernando García Duchini; 28 November 1963 (age 62) Montevideo, Uruguay
- Party: National Party
- Spouse: Rosana Supparo
- Children: 3
- Education: University of the Republic

Javier Fernando García Duchini (born 28 November 1963) is a Uruguayan politician of the National Party, currently serving as Senator of the Republic since 2024. He previously served as Minister of National Defense from 2020 to 2024 under Luis Lacalle Pou, and as National Representative on several occasions.

== Early life ==
García was born on 28 November 1963 in the capital city of Montevideo. Through his mother, Margarita Duchini, he is of Italian descent. García is a graduate of the Faculty of Medicine at the University of the Republic, receiving his Doctor of Medicine degree in 1991. Thereafter, García began his specialization in pediatrics. García began his political activities within the Movement for the Homeland as an opponent of the military dictatorship.

== Political career ==
In 2004, García accompanied Jorge Larrañaga in the presidential candidacy. Together with Pablo Iturralde, they lead a successful list for Montevideo. In the 2004 Uruguayan general election, García was elected deputy for the National Alliance sector of the National Party.

In the 2005 municipal elections, García was the only candidate of the National Party to the Intendant of Montevideo. In the 2009 primary elections, he again supported the candidacy of Jorge Larrañaga as a candidate for the presidency of the National Party. At the end of December 2012, García announced his separation from the National Alliance sector and aligned himself with future president Luis Alberto Lacalle Pou, who at that time, was a presidential candidate for the 2014 presidential primaries.

In the 2019 general election, García was the second Senator candidate on the Space 40 list, headed by Lacalle Pou. He was elected Senator of the Republic. After Lacalle Pou's election, he was appointed Minister of National Defense, a position he assumed on 1 March 2020.

== Controversies ==
On 18 November 2016, Semanario Brecha indicated that García had failed to clarify on numerous press releases that he did not have the title of pediatrician that was awarded to him. In an interview with that newspaper, Garcia admitted that he did not possess the pediatrician title stating "I do not award myself or let myself be awarded" and denounced what he considered an attack on himself.

== Personal life ==
He is married to Rosana Supparo and together they have three children: Alfonso, Belén, and Delfina.
