= Secretary of the Presidency of Uruguay =

Secretary of the Presidency
- Secretario de la Presidencia
- Incumbent; Alejandro Sánchez Pereira since 1 March 2025
- Executive Tower
- Reports to: President of Uruguay
- Appointer: President of Uruguay
- Formation: 1 March 1967
- First holder: Héctor Giorgi
- Salary: UYU 360,518.98 (US$8,638) monthly (as of January 2024)
- Website: www.gub.uy/presidencia/

The Secretary of the Presidency of Uruguay (Spanish: Secretario de Presidencia) is a government office within the Uruguayan presidency tasked with overseeing the government's general administration and assisting the President of the Republic in their functions, in addition to certain responsibilities that depend on the administration.

The Secretary of the Presidency is a political appointee of the president of the Uruguay who does not require parliamentary confirmation, and who serves at the pleasure of the President. The position was introduced in the 1967 Constitution, which establishes that the office holder acts as such in the sessions of the Council of Ministers, and that he would cease to hold office once the president's term ended.

== Role ==
The responsibilities of the secretary of the Presidency are both managerial and advisory and may include the following:

- Advise the Presidency of the Republic on the implementation of State policies.
- Plan and order the implementation and execution of all policies determined by the Presidency of the Republic.
- Advise the Executive Branch of the government in emergency situations.
- Carry out the activities or tasks entrusted to it by the President of the Republic.
- Organize, direct and coordinate the National Quality Program in the production of goods and services in the country.

== List of Secretaries of the Presidency ==
#	Name	Term of office		Tenure length	President	Notes
#	Name	Start of term	End of term	Tenure length	President	Notes
1	Héctor Giorgi	March 1, 1967	March 26, 1971	4 years, 25 days	Óscar Diego Gestido	
2	Carlos Pirán	March 26, 1971	February 28, 1972	339 days	Jorge Pacheco Areco	
3	Luis Barrios Tassano	March 1, 1972	June 27, 1973	1 year, 118 days	Juan María Bordaberry	
4	Álvaro Pacheco Seré	June 27, 1973	August 31, 1976	3 years, 65 days	Juan María Bordaberry	
5	Luis Vargas Garmendia	September 1, 1976	March 1, 1980	3 years, 182 days	Aparicio Méndez	
6	Enrique Ferri	March 1, 1980	August 31, 1981	1 year, 95 days	Aparicio Méndez	
7	Ángel Mario Scelza	September 1, 1981	February 12, 1985	3 years, 164 days	Gregorio Conrado Álvarez	
8	Miguel Semino	March 1, 1985	November 30, 1989	4 years, 274 days	Julio María Sanguinetti	
9	Carlos Balsa	November 30, 1989	March 1, 1990	91 days	Julio María Sanguinetti	
10	Pablo García Pintos	March 1, 1990	March 1, 1995	5 years, 0 days	Luis Alberto Lacalle	
11	Elías Bluth	March 1, 1995	February 29, 2000	4 years, 365 days	Julio María Sanguinetti	
12	Raúl Lago Finsterwald	March 1, 2000	February 28, 2005	4 years, 364 days	Jorge Batlle	
13	Gonzalo Fernández	March 1, 2005	March 3, 2008	3 years, 2 days	Tabaré Vázquez	
14	Miguel Toma Sanchis	March 3, 2008	February 28, 2010	1 year, 362 days	Tabaré Vázquez	
15	Alberto Breccia Guzzo	March 1, 2010	October 31, 2012	2 years, 244 days	José Mujica	
16	Homero Guerrero	November 1, 2012	February 28, 2015	4 years, 364 days	José Mujica	
17	Miguel Toma Sanchis	March 1, 2015	February 28, 2020	4 years, 364 days	Tabaré Vázquez	
18	Álvaro Delgado Ceretta	March 1, 2020	December 21, 2023	3 years, 295 days	Luis Lacalle Pou	
19	Rodrigo Ferrés	December 21, 2023	March 1, 2025	2 years, 323 days	Luis Lacalle Pou	
20	Alejandro Sánchez	March 1, 2025	Incumbent	1 year, 253 days	Yamandú Orsi	
