= Martín Lema =

Uruguayan lawyer and politician

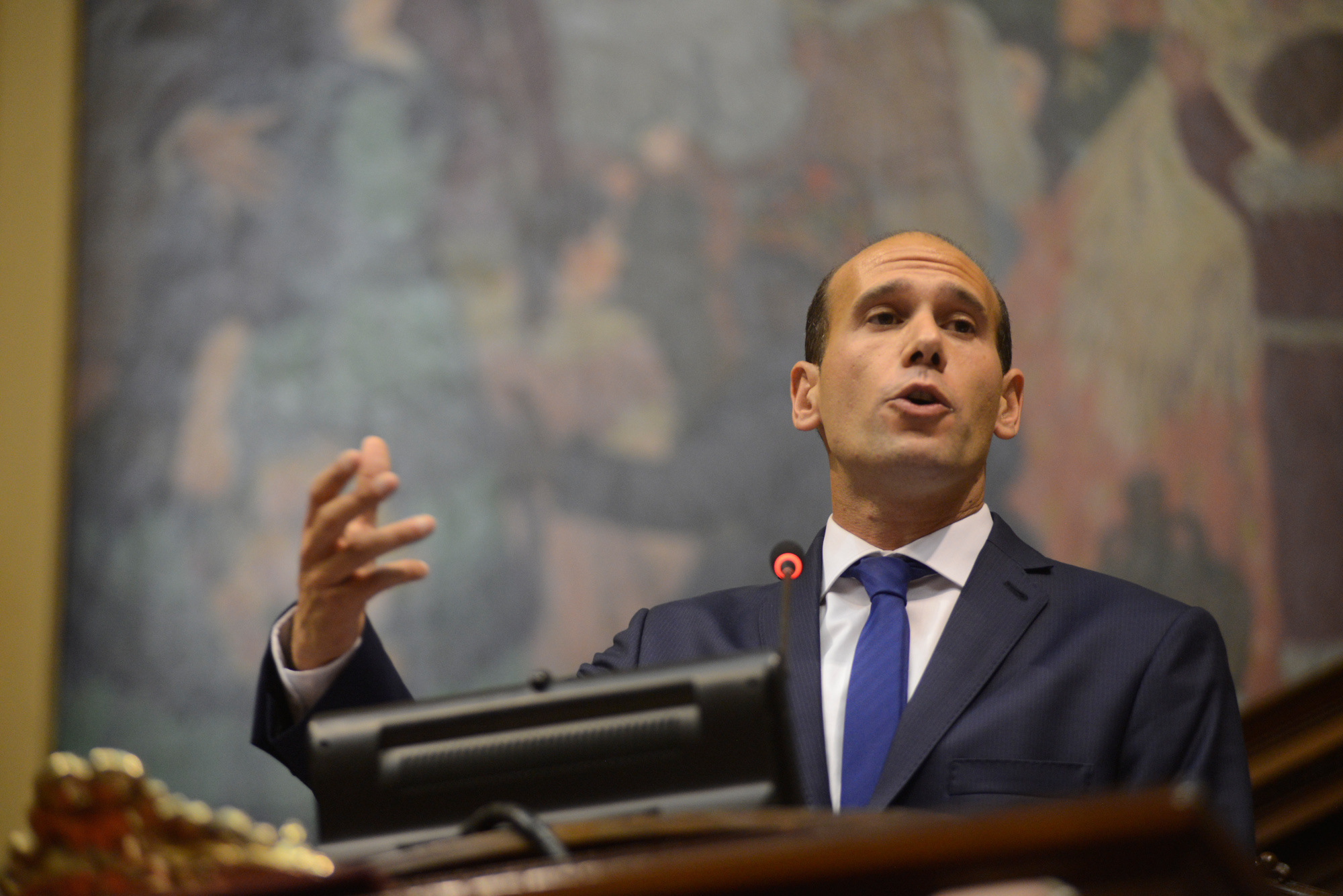
- Martín Lema in 2020.

National Representative for Montevideo
- Incumbent
- Assumed office 4 March 2024
- In office 15 February 2015 – 1 May 2021

Minister of Social Development of Uruguay
- In office 3 May 2021 – 4 March 2024
- President: Luis Lacalle Pou
- Preceded by: Pablo Bartol
- Succeeded by: Alejandro Sciarra

President of the Chamber of Representatives of Uruguay
- In office 15 February 2020 – 1 March 2021
- Succeeded by: Alfredo Fratti
- Preceded by: Cecilia Bottino

Personal details
- Born: Martín Alejandro Lema Peretta; 6 September 1982 (age 44) Montevideo, Uruguay
- Party: National Party
- Education: University of the Republic
- Occupation: Lawyer and politician

Martín Alejandro Lema Perretta (born September 6, 1982) is a Uruguayan lawyer and politician of the National Party, serving as Senator of the Republic in the 50th Legislature. He previously served as Minister of Social Development from 2021 to 2024, as National Representative 49th Legislature and as president of the Chamber of Representatives in 2020.

== Early life and education ==
Lema was born in the Jacinto Vera neighborhood of Montevideo, the son of an elementary school teacher and the owner of a food company, both of whom were not members of any political party. He attended Elbio Fernández School. In 2002 he enrolled at the University of the Republic, where he graduated in law. While he was studying at university, he was a member of the University Guild Current (CGU), a student union with a long association with the National Party.

== Political career ==
After graduating, he worked in the private sector until 2006, when at the request of then-representative Luis Alberto Lacalle Pou, he entered active politics in the National Party. In 2008 he co-founded, together with other young politicians, the Aire Fresco sector – Lista 404. From 2010 to 2015 he was an advisor to Luis Alberto Lacalle, while serving in the Senate.

In the 2014 general election, he was first elected to the Chamber of Representatives for the Montevideo Department. During the 48th Legislature, he focused on health issues, for which he joined the parliamentary commission on Health and Social Assistance, which he chaired in 2017. In 2017, he also appointed the creation of a parliamentary investigative commission on the management of the State Health Services Administration during the Broad Front administrations. The results of the commission's work led then-President Tabaré Vázquez to dismiss the body's top management in February 2018.

In the 2019 general election, he was re-elected as National Representative for the 49th Legislature. In February 2020, at the start of the legislative sessions, he was elected President of the Chamber of Representatives for the first annual period (2020-2021). In February 2021, prior to finishing his term as president of the Chamber, he announced that during annual term, 4.2 million dollars had been saved, which were allocated to General Revenues.

On May 1, 2021, President Luis Lacalle Pou announced Lema as Pablo Bartol's successor as head of the Ministry of Social Development. The reason for Bartol's dismissal was the "demanding social consequences of the pandemic", which had to be addressed by "strong political and territorial coordination". He took office on May 4, 2021.

In March 2024, he resigned from his ministerial post to return to his seat in the Chamber of Representatives and actively participate in the electoral campaign. He endorsed Álvaro Delgado Ceretta for president in the June presidential primaries and for the general election he is a candidate for the Senate on the Lista 404 electoral list of the Aire Fresco sector, as first substitute for the head of the list, Luis Lacalle Pou.

On December 20, 2024, the Montevideo Departmental Commission of the National Party confirmed Lema as the party's candidate for Intendant of Montevideo within the Republican Coalition for the 2025 municipal election. On February 6, 2024, the Republican Coalition officially presented its three candidates, Lema for the National Party, Virginia Cáceres for the Colorado Party, and Roque García for Cabildo Abierto. The Independent Party did not present a candidate and instead adhered to Lema's candidacy.
