= Luis Lacalle Pou =

President of Uruguay from 2020 to 2025

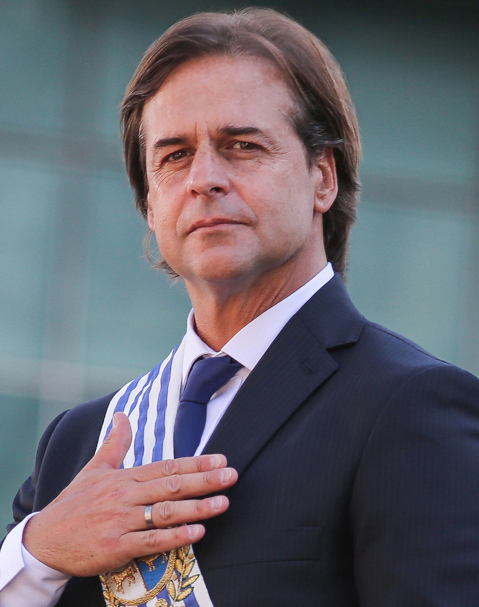
- Official portrait, 2020

42nd President of Uruguay
- In office 1 March 2020 – 1 March 2025
- Vice President: Beatriz Argimón
- Preceded by: Tabaré Vázquez
- Succeeded by: Yamandú Orsi

Senator of the Republic
- In office 15 February 2015 – 12 August 2019
- Constituency: At-large

President of the Chamber of Representatives
- In office 1 March 2011 – 1 March 2012
- Preceded by: Ivonne Passada
- Succeeded by: Jorge Orrico

National Representative
- In office 15 February 2000 – 15 February 2015
- Constituency: Canelones

Personal details
- Born: Luis Alberto Aparicio Alejandro Lacalle Pou; 11 August 1973 (age 53) Montevideo, Uruguay
- Party: National Party
- Spouse: Lorena Ponce de León (m. 2000; div. 2024)
- Children: 3
- Parents: Luis Alberto Lacalle (father); Julia Pou (mother)
- Education: The British Schools
- Alma mater: Catholic University of Uruguay
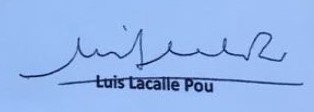
- Signature

Luis Alberto Aparicio Alejandro Lacalle Pou (Latin American Spanish: [ˈlwis laˈkaʝe ˈpow], locally [ˈlwih laˈkaʒe ˈpow, -aʃe -]; born 11 August 1973), is a Uruguayan politician and lawyer, who served as the 42nd president of Uruguay from 2020 to 2025.

The son of former president Luis Alberto Lacalle, Lacalle Pou attended The British Schools of Montevideo and graduated from the Catholic University of Uruguay in 1998 with a law degree. A member of the National Party, he was first elected to the Chamber of Representatives in the 1999 election as a National Representative for the Canelones Department, a position he held from 2000 to 2015. During the first session of the 47th Legislature (2011–2012) he chaired the lower house of the General Assembly. He also served as Senator from 2015 to 2019. He ran unsuccessfully for president in 2014.

Five years later, he defeated the Broad Front nominee and former mayor of Montevideo Daniel Martínez in the 2019 general election and was elected President of Uruguay with 50.79% of the vote in the second round. At the age of 46, Lacalle Pou ended the 15 years of leftist rule in the country and became the youngest president since the end of the dictatorship in 1985.

During his presidency, Lacalle Pou oversaw several reforms to retirement and pension laws and the education system. He led Uruguay's response to the COVID-19 pandemic and vaccination rollout, for which he won praise and high approval ratings for his successful handling of the virus. In April 2020, his administration presented a bill under the constitutional label of "Urgent Consideration Law", which after being enacted on July 8, 2020, introduced reforms and restructuring in various areas. After an opposition campaign, a referendum was held in March 2022 to ask the electorate whether 135 articles of the law should be repealed, with the option to keep them in force winning.

During his presidency, events occurred such as a drought that caused some protests due to the reduction in water availability and access in the Montevideo metropolitan area for a few weeks in mid-2023. In addition, a series of controversies arose with certain figures within his administration, resulting in several resignations such as Alejandro Astesiano, former chief custodian who was dismissed from his position and subsequently arrested for forging Uruguayan identity cards and passports for Russian citizens. In July 2024, it was announced that Lacalle Pou would be a candidate for the Senate in the 2024 general election. He was not able to run for a second term as president due to a constitutional ban on consecutive re-election.

== Early life and education ==
Lacalle Pou was born on 11 August 1973 in the capital city of Montevideo. Lacalle Pou comes from a family with historical ties with the nation's government; he is the son of former president Luis Alberto Lacalle and former first lady and senator Julia Pou. He has two siblings, Pilar and Juan José, and is the great-grandson of Luis Alberto de Herrera on his paternal side. He is also a distant relative to political figure Joaquín Suárez.

Lacalle Pou lived in the Pocitos neighborhood during his childhood and adolescence. When his father took office as president in 1990, his family moved to the Suárez presidential residence in Prado. At the age of 14, a medical consultation in the United States revealed that he had a growth hormone problem. He underwent treatment with hormone injections that allowed him to reach an adult height of 1.70 meters.

He took up surfing during his youth and also played football for Montevideo Cricket Club. He was educated at The British Schools of Montevideo. As his final years at the school coincided with his father's elevation to the presidency, a guard was posted at the school gates while he and his younger brother attended class. Resisting official protocol to be taken to school in a car by government escort, he instead preferred to drive himself in an old family vehicle. In 1993 he enrolled at the Catholic University of Uruguay to study law, graduating in 1998.

== Political career ==
In the 1999 general elections, Lacalle Pou was elected representative for Canelones, serving the 2000–2005 term. He was re-elected in 2004 under the Herrerist faction of the National Party, a movement founded by his great-grandfather, Luis Alberto de Herrera. In the 2009 general elections, he was elected for a third consecutive time and served until 2015. As leader of the opposition, he opposed some laws and principles of the past left-wing government. He defines himself as religious, which is why he emphasized his commitment to disincentiveize abortion, and resorting to it only when necessary.

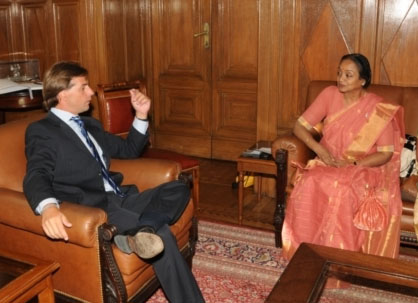
Lacalle Pou in a meeting with the Speaker of the Lok Sabha, Meira Kumar in Montevideo, 2012

Lacalle Pou was a candidate for Intendant of Canelones in the 2010 municipal election, obtaining 22.82% of the votes and being defeated by Marcos Carámbula of the Broad Front. He was the leader of the political lists 404 (Montevideo) and 400 (Canelones).

== Presidential candidacies ==
=== 2014 ===
On 30 March 2014, Lacalle Pou launched his bid for the presidency. On 1 June 2014 he was nominated as candidate of his party for the presidential elections in October, in which he was elected Senator of the Republic. He was defeated on the second round of presidential election on 30 November 2014.

=== 2019 ===
In the 2019 presidential primaries, Lacalle Pou competed against Enrique Antía, Carlos Iafigliola, Jorge Larrañaga and the new candidate Juan Sartori. Lacalle Pou won by 53% of the votes, enough to announce Beatriz Argimón the same night of 30 June as a vice president candidate.

In the first round of the 2019 general election, held on Sunday, 27 October 2019, he obtained second place with 28.62% of the votes. As no presidential candidate received a majority of voting, a runoff election took place on 24 November. In the runoff, Luis Lacalle Pou garnered 48.71% of the unofficial vote. His opponent, Broad Front candidate and former intendant of Montevideo, Daniel Martínez obtained 47.51% of the vote. The Electoral Court of Uruguay published the official results Friday, 29 November 2019, as observed votes were still to be counted, totaling more than the difference between the two candidates, thus the difference being too close to do so. Daniel Martinez did not concede the results yet, awaiting the official count. Lacalle Pou unofficially declared himself the winner, as the votes already counted marked an irreversible trend. Martínez conceded defeat on 28 November 2019. On 30 November, final votes counts confirmed Lacalle Pou as the winner with 48.8% of the total votes cast over Martínez with 47.3%. He was the first National/Blanco candidate to win the presidency since his father left office in 1995. His election also marked only the fourth time in 154 years that the Blancos had been elected to lead the government.

== President of Uruguay ==
Presidential styles of Luis Lacalle Pou
- Reference style: Señor Presidente. "Mr. President"
- Alternative style: Presidente de la República. "President of the Republic"

=== Inauguration ===
Lacalle took office on 1 March 2020. After the constitutional oath before the General Assembly, he paraded down with Vice President Beatriz Argimón along Libertador Avenue in a 1937 Ford V8 convertible that belonged to his great-grandfather, Luis Alberto de Herrera. The parade ended in Plaza Independencia, where he received the presidential sash from the outgoing President Tabaré Vázquez.

With a coalition of five parties, ranging from the centre-left to the hard right, he intends to pursue a policy of austerity. During his campaign, he promised to cut government spending in order to reduce the public deficit. Claiming to be a liberal, he declared that he wanted to favour business leaders in the face of "tax pressure". He proposed before his inauguration to establish an attractive tax policy to attract wealthy foreigners. The left-wing party Frente Amplio deplores initiatives that could lead to a "setback" for the country, which risks becoming a "tax haven" again, as it was in the past.

Lacalle had announced during his electoral campaign the introduction of a package of government measures through an urgent consideration law, a prerogative of the Executive Power in Uruguay that allows it to send to the General Assembly a bill with a peremptory term of 90 days, expired which is approved in the affirmative form if the General Assembly is not issued to the contrary. The 2020 coronavirus pandemic delayed the presentation of the bill, which finally formally entered the Parliament on 23 April 2020.

=== Cabinet ===
Lacalle announced his cabinet on 16 December 2019, which is formed by an electoral alliance, the Coalición Multicolor, which is made up of the National Party, the Colorado Party, Open Cabildo, the Independent Party and the Party of the People. He declared that it was going to be a "government of action", and that he wanted to form a "government that talks a lot with the people".

Cabinet of Luis Lacalle Pou's Government
Office	Name	Political party	Term
Ministry of National Defense	Javier García Duchini	National	1 March 2020 – 4 March 2024
Ministry of National Defense	Armando Castaingdebat	National	4 March 2024 – 1 March 2025
Ministry of the Interior	Jorge Larrañaga	National	1 March 2020 – 22 May 2021
Ministry of the Interior	Luis Alberto Héber	National	24 May 2021 – 4 November 2023
Ministry of the Interior	Nicolás Martinelli	National	6 November 2023 – 1 March 2025
Ministry of Foreign Relations	Ernesto Talvi	Colorado	1 March 2020 – 6 July 2020
Ministry of Foreign Relations	Francisco Bustillo	nonpartisan politician	6 July 2020 – 1 November 2023
Ministry of Foreign Relations	Omar Paganini	National	6 November 2023 – 1 March 2025
Ministry of Economy and Finance	Azucena Arbeleche	National	1 March 2020 – 1 March 2025
Ministry of Education and Culture	Pablo Da Silveira	National	1 March 2020 – 1 March 2025
Ministry of Public Health	Daniel Salinas	Open Cabildo	1 March 2020 – 13 March 2023
Ministry of Public Health	Karina Rando	Open Cabildo	13 March 2023 – 1 March 2025
Ministry of Social Development	Pablo Bartol	National	1 March 2020 – 1 May 2021
Ministry of Social Development	Martín Lema	National	3 May 2021 – 4 March 2024
Ministry of Social Development	Alejandro Sciarra	National	4 March 2024 – 1 March 2025
Ministry of Labour and Social Welfare	Pablo Mieres	Independent	1 March 2020 – 1 March 2025
Ministry of Transport and Public Works	Luis Alberto Héber	National	1 March 2020 – 24 May 2021
Ministry of Transport and Public Works	José Luis Falero	National	25 May 2021 – 1 March 2025
Ministry of Livestock, Agriculture, and Fisheries	Carlos María Uriarte	Colorado	1 March 2020 – 27 June 2021
Ministry of Livestock, Agriculture, and Fisheries	Fernando Mattos	Colorado	27 June 2021 – 1 March 2025
Ministry of Industry, Energy and Mining	Omar Paganini	National	1 March 2020 – 4 November 2023
Ministry of Industry, Energy and Mining	Elisa Faccio	National	6 November 2023 – 1 March 2025
Ministry of Housing and Territorial Planning	Irene Moreira	Open Cabildo	1 March 2020 – 5 May 2023
Ministry of Housing and Territorial Planning	Raúl Lozano Bonet	Open Cabildo	9 May 2023 – 1 March 2025
Ministry of Tourism	Germán Cardoso	Colorado	1 March 2020 – 22 March 2021
Ministry of Tourism	Tabaré Viera	Colorado	23 August 2021 – 11 March 2024
Ministry of Tourism	Eduardo Sanguinetti	Colorado	11 March 2024 – 1 March 2025
Ministry of Environment	Adrián Peña	Colorado	27 August 2020 – 30 January 2023
Ministry of Environment	Robert Bouvier	Colorado	1 February 2023 – 1 March 2025
Secretariat of Sports	Sebastián Bauzá	National	1 March 2020 – 1 March 2025
Secretariat of the Presidency	Álvaro Delgado	National	1 March 2020 – 21 December 2023
Secretariat of the Presidency	Rodrigo Ferrés	National	21 December 2023 – 1 March 2025
Deputy Secretariat of the Presidency	Rodrigo Ferrés	National	1 March 2020 – 21 December 2023
Deputy Secretariat of the Presidency	Mariana Cabrera	National	21 December 2023 – 1 March 2025
Office of Planning and Budget	Isaac Alfie	Colorado	1 March 2020 – 15 December 2023
Office of Planning and Budget	Fernando Blanco	National	15 December 2023 – 1 March 2025

=== Foreign policy ===
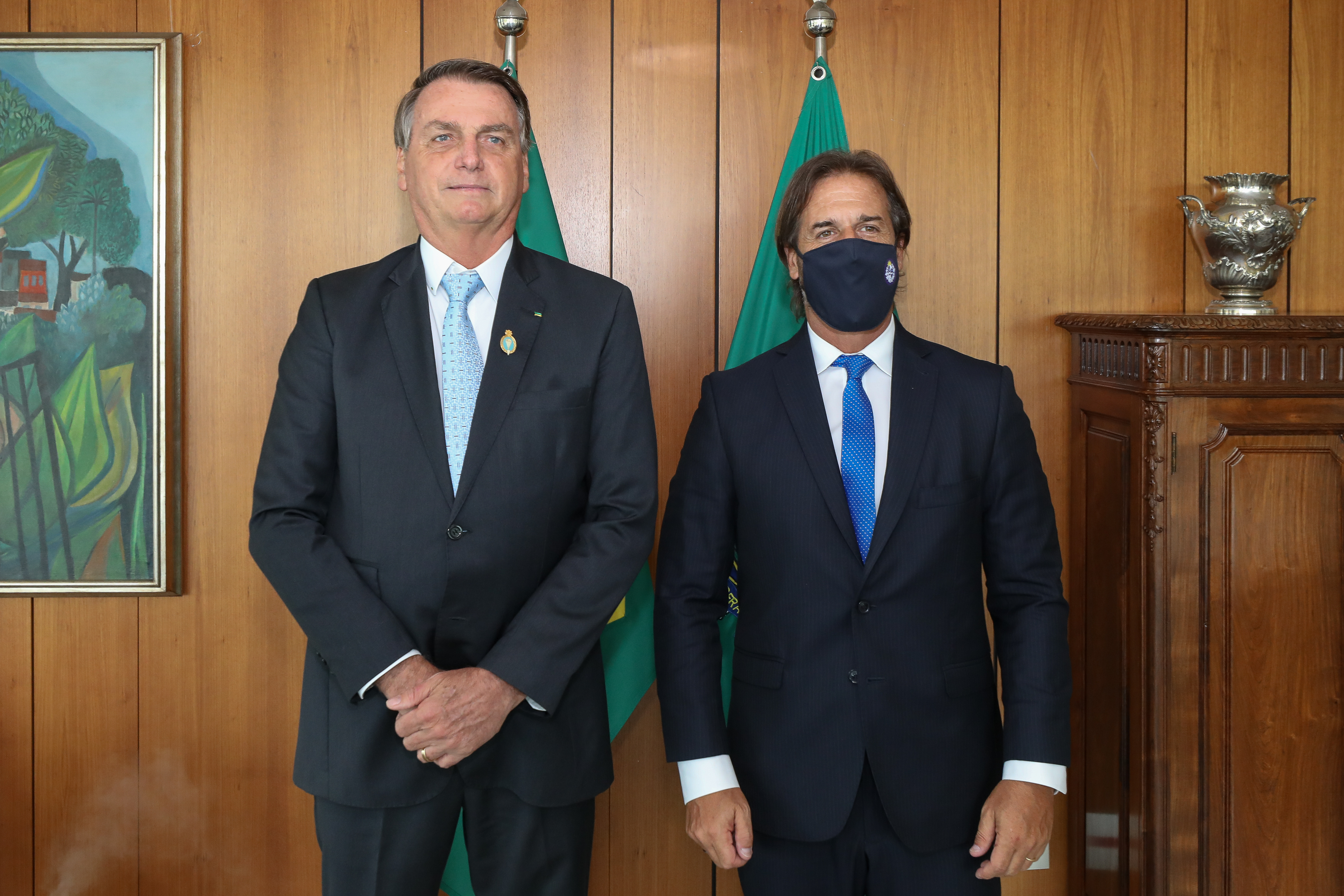
President Lacalle Pou with Brazilian President Jair Bolsonaro

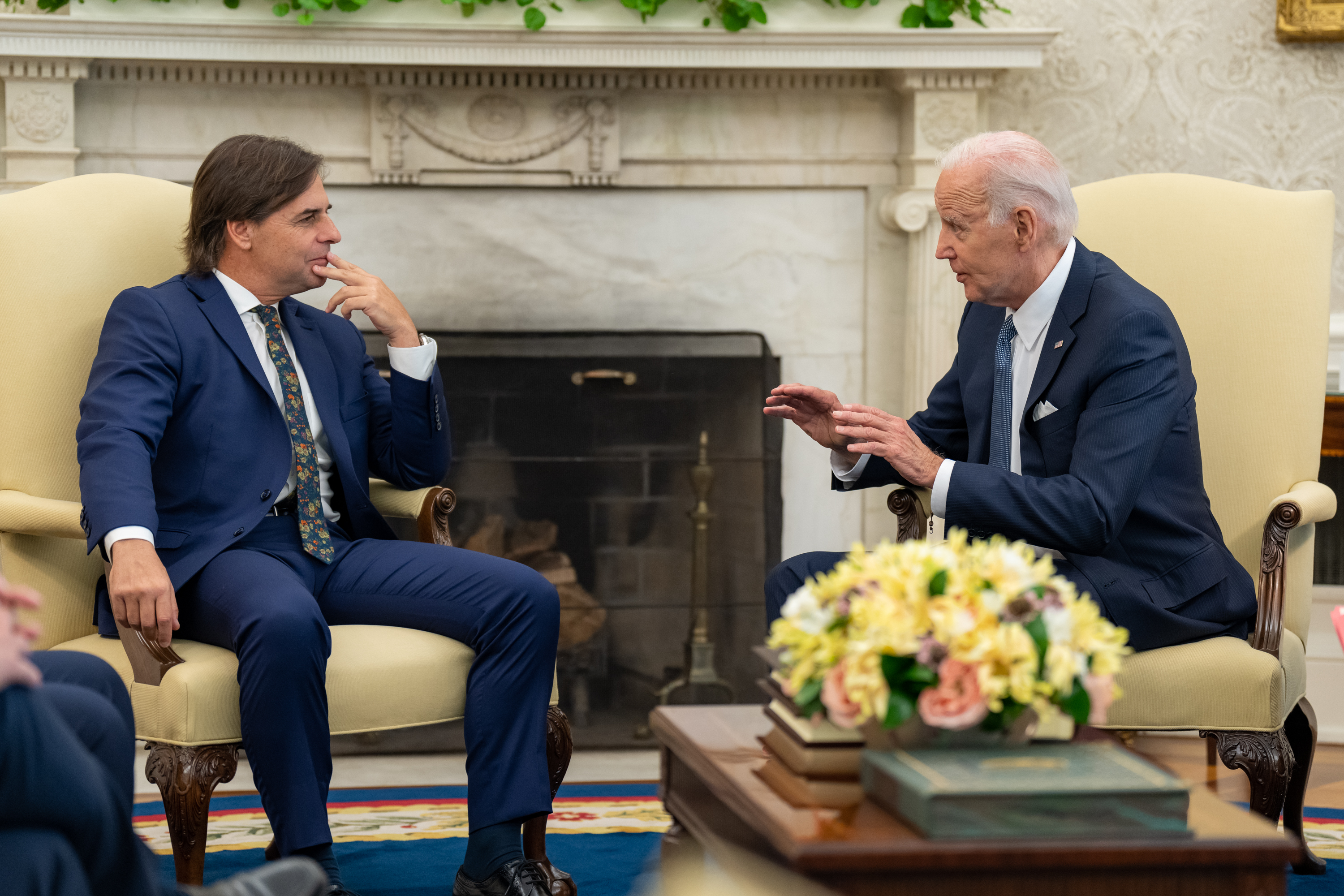
President Lacalle Pou with U.S. President Joe Biden

During Lacalle Pou's first days of presidency, Uruguay's foreign relations shifted substantially from those under Broad Front. After taking office, he condemned the government of Nicolás Maduro in Venezuela. And also Lacalle decided not to invite him to his inauguration stating "it is a personal decision, which I take care of. This is not the Chancellery, this is not protocol, this is my person who made this decision". The presidents of Cuba and Nicaragua were not invited either. However, the Lacalle government refused to recognize Guaidó as legitimate President of Venezuela and instead recognized him as President of the National Assembly stating that recognizing Guaidó at the same time that Maduro is in power is a "step that for now we cannot take." In January 2021, the Lacalle government refused to recognize the new National Assembly, and stated that the Maduro's "dictatorial regime" violates the "rule of law."

Lacalle's government ordered the withdrawal of Uruguay from the Union of South American Nations (UNASUR), arguing that it occurred because "it is an organization that became an ideological political alliance contrary to the country's objectives of linking." In addition, it was reported that the country would return to the Inter-American Treaty of Reciprocal Assistance (TIAR) and that the government would support Luis Almagro in a re-election to the post of president of the Organization of American States. Lacalle has been in favor of a flexibilization of the Southern Common Market (MERCOSUR) rules, such as the common external fees. He has also proposed to deepen the free trade zone.

During his presidency, Luis Lacalle Pou pursued closer economic and diplomatic relations with the United States. In June 2023, he held a bilateral meeting with U.S. President Joe Biden at the White House to discuss trade, investment, and regional security.Lacalle Pou's government condemned the Russian invasion of Ukraine in February 2022 and advocated for the application of the Minsk agreements as a "peaceful and lasting" solution to the conflict. During the Gaza war, he condemned the actions of Hamas as terrorism and expressed solidarity with the Israeli people. The Lacalle government also requested to enter the Trans-Pacific Partnership in New Zealand.

=== COVID-19 pandemic ===
The COVID-19 pandemic emerged within the first days of Lacalle Pou's presidency. The first four cases, all imported, were reported on 13 March. On 14 March, Lacalle requested the cancellation of public performances, and the closure of some public places. An awareness campaign was launched and citizens were advised to stay home. A two-week suspension of classes at public and private schools was also announced. On 16 March, Lacalle issued an order to close all border crossings except Carrasco International Airport. The border with Argentina was closed effective 17 March at midnight.

Lacalle refused to implement the lockdown, appealing for "individual freedom". On April 17, he informed that his administration decided to create an committee, made up of experts that would define methods and studies to advise the government. The experts would be: the mathematician, electrical engineer, and academic from the Latin American Academy of Sciences, Fernando Paganini; Dr. Rafael Radi, the first Uruguayan scientist at the National Academy of Sciences of the United States and president of the National Academy of Sciences of Uruguay; and Dr. Henry Cohen, President of the National Academy of Medicine and awarded as a Master by the World Gastroenterology Organisation in 2019. The group disbanded after 14 months.

At the beginning, its measures were praised, when the country was facing a relative control of the situation and a low number of cases per day. By the beginning of 2021, infections started to increase to almost 8,000 cases per day, until the end of July when it started to decrease again. In January 2022, daily cases peaked at 14,000 cases per day for four months before declining.

=== 2022 referendum ===
In April 2020, the Lacalle administration presented a bill "of urgent consideration" –power of the Executive Branch of the Government according to Article 168 of the Constitution. It contained modifications in different areas, such as the economy, public safety, education, and work. It was approved in both the Senate and the Chamber of Representatives, and signed into law on 9 July 2020. Opposition to the law consisted of the national trade union center PIT-CNT and the opposition party Broad Front, which launched a campaign to collect signatures to file a referendum appeal on 135 articles of the law. Finally, a referendum was held on 27 March 2022, in which the option not to repeal 135 articles of said law was imposed with 50% of the votes, compared to the option in favor of repealing with 48%.

== Personal life ==
Lacalle Pou married Lorena Ponce de León in 2000, in a service conducted by Daniel Sturla in the Montevideo Metropolitan Cathedral. Together, they have three children: Luis Alberto, Violeta and Manuel, two of whom were born through in vitro fertilization. In May 2022, the couple announced their separation, and in June 2024, the divorce process was finalized.

Lacalle Pou is a surfing enthusiast, and has been practicing this sport since the 1980s. He is also an avid fan of rugby union and is a follower of the Old Boys & Old Girls Club (the alumni team of his former school) as well as the national rugby union team, and has been seen wearing the national team tie at public functions.

== See also ==
- List of political families of Uruguay

Political offices
Preceded by Ivonne Passada	President of the Chamber of Representatives; 2011–2012	Succeeded by Jorge Orrico
Preceded by Tabaré Vázquez	President of Uruguay; 2020–2025	Succeeded by Yamandú Orsi
Party political offices
Preceded by Luis Alberto Lacalle	National Party nominee for President of Uruguay; 2014, 2019	Most recent
