= Ministry of Social Development (Uruguay) =

Government ministry of Uruguay

- Ministerio de Desarrollo Social
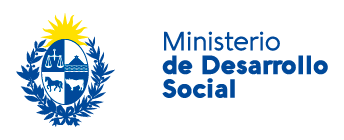

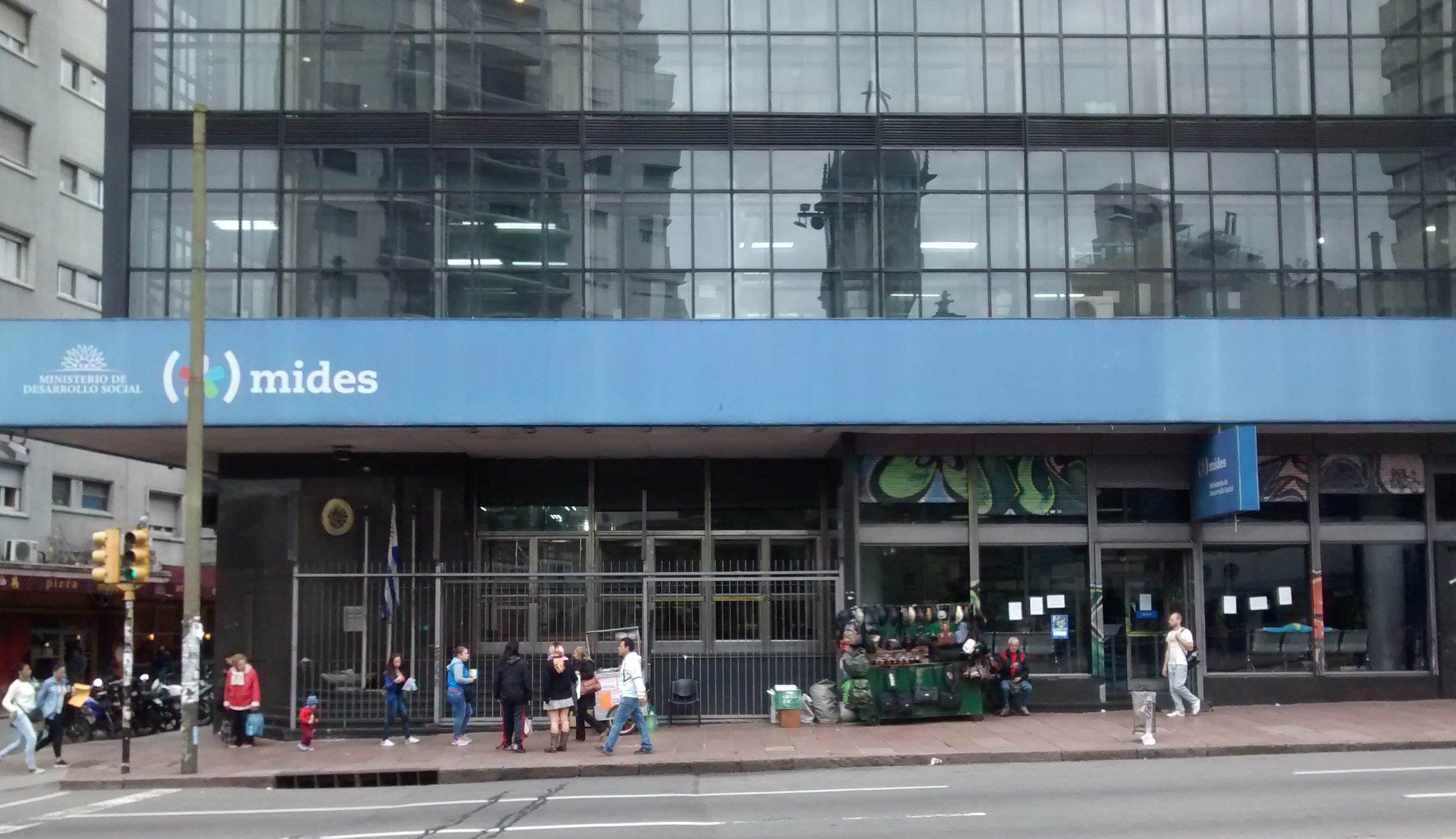

Ministry overview
- Formed: 21 March 2005
- Jurisdiction: Government of Uruguay
- Headquarters: Montevideo
- Minister responsible: Gonzalo Civila
- Website: Social Development

The Ministry of Social Development (Spanish: Ministerio de Desarrollo Social, MIDES) of Uruguay is the ministry of the Government of Uruguay that is responsible for proposing, generating and activating national social policies. It is headquartered at 18 de Julio Avenue in the Cordón neighborhood, Montevideo.

It was created on March 21, 2005, by Emergency Law No. 17,866, 20 days after President Tabaré Vázquez took office. The first minister appointed by the president was Marina Arismendi.

== List of ministers of social development ==
Minister	Term start	Term end	Party
Marina Arismendi	2005	2010	Broad Front (PCU)
Ana María Vignoli	2010	2011	Broad Front (PCU)
Daniel Olesker	2011	2015	Broad Front (PS)
Marina Arismendi	2015	2020	Broad Front (PCU)
Pablo Bartol	2020	2021	National
Martín Lema	2021	2024	National
Alejandro Sciarra	2024	2025	National
Gonzalo Civila	2025	Incumbent	Broad Front (PS)
