= Jop (surname) =

Jop is a surname. Notable people with the surname include:

- Franciszek Jop (1897–1976), Polish Roman Catholic bishop
- Mariusz Jop (born 1978), Polish footballer

== See also ==
- JOP (disambiguation)
- Jopp
- Jopp Group
- Jupp (surname)
