= Uruguayan intrastate war =

1972 conflict in Uruguay

- Part of the Cold War in Latin America
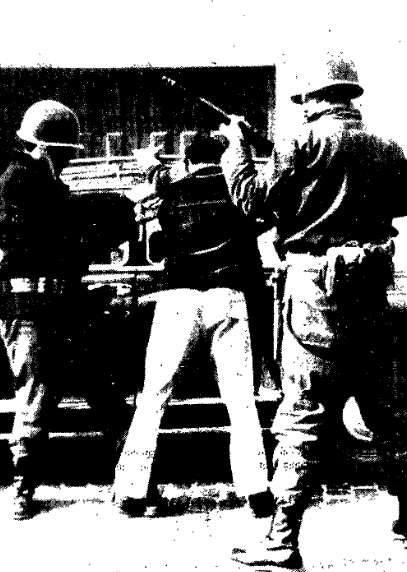
- Uruguayan soldiers detaining a car driver, 1972.
Date	15 April 1972; State Security Law: 10 July 1972; 1973 Uruguayan coup d'état: 27 June 1973
Location	Uruguay
Result	Uruguayan government victory

Belligerents
Far-left guerrillas Tupamaros; OPR-33; FARO; Supported by:Cuba; USSR	Uruguay; Supported by:United States	Far-right guerrillas Juventud Uruguaya de Pie; Death Squads

Commanders and leaders
Eleuterio Fernández Huidobro (POW); Héctor Amodio Pérez; Henry Engler (POW); Mauricio Rosencof (POW); Raúl Sendic (POW)	(Uruguay) Juan María Bordaberry; Gregorio Álvarez; Eduardo Zubía; Ramón Trabal	Miguel Sofía (alleged)

Units involved
Tupamaro militias OPR-33 militias Oriental Revolutionary Armed Forces	Joint Forces: National Army of Uruguay; National Police of Uruguay	JUP militias Comando Caza Tupamaros; Comando Dan A. Mitrione; Defensa Armada Nacionalista; Comando Armando Leses; Brigadas Nacionales; Escuadrón de Justicia Oriental

The Uruguayan intrastate war (Spanish: Guerra Interna) was a short military conflict in which the Uruguayan Government carried out a general crackdown on left-wing guerrillas through the implementation of martial law. The Intrastate War was declared by the Uruguayan Parliament on 15 April 1972.

== Background and declaration ==
The intrastate war was declared after a period of widespread political violence. Amidst a deep inflationary crisis, the government had assumed the role of fixing prices and salaries through the COPRIN institution, and had announced a raise in wages by 20% for April 1972 despite the trade unions had asked for a 40%. This led to a resume of social mobilizations, which had been mitigated in previous months, both from trade unions and from student organizations.

Urban guerrillas intensified their activity that month: an army lieutenant was shot in the stomach by Raúl Sendic at Mercedes, left-wing guerrillas raided the National Council of Family Allocations and a home appliances store, and right-wing paramilitary groups attacked the homes of Zelmar Michelini and Enrique Rodríguez Fabregat. One of the most impressive terrorist blows was the jailbreak from the Punta Carretas prison by 21 members of the Tupamaros.

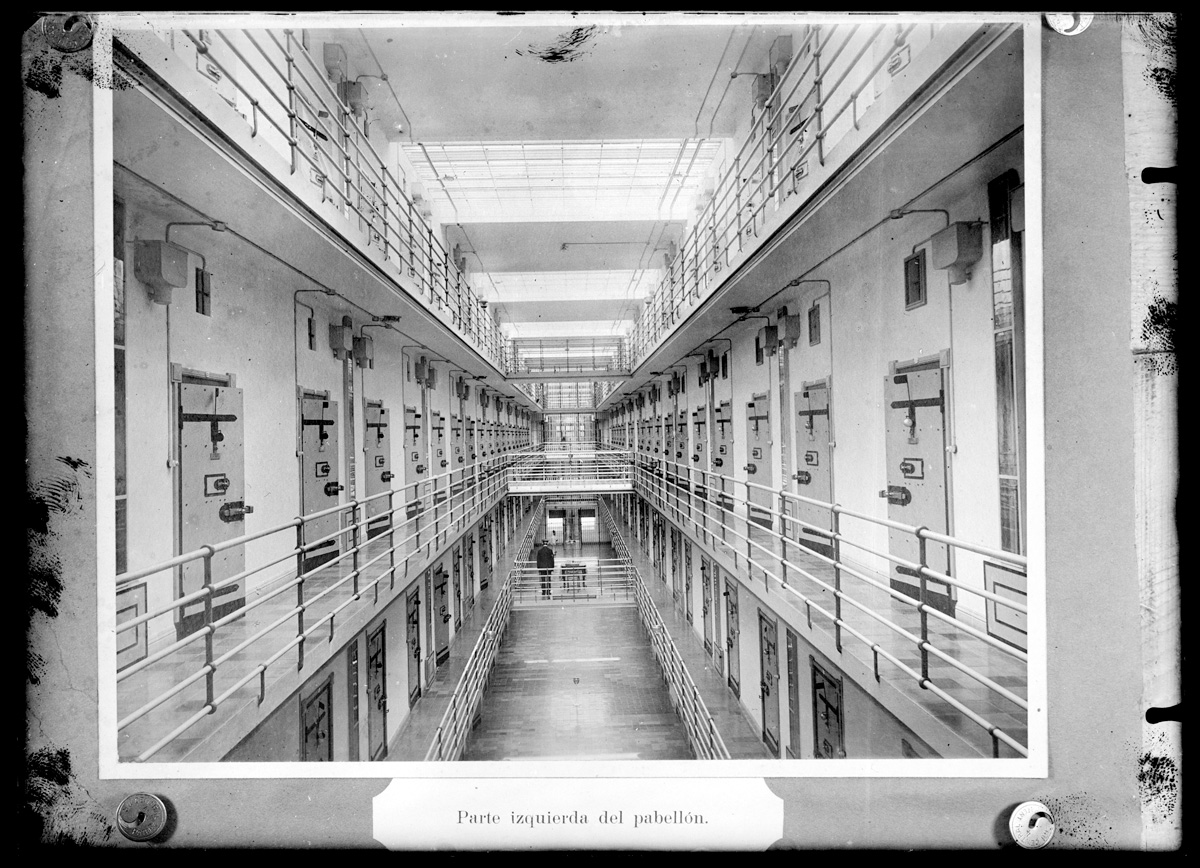
Punta Carretas prison, 1918.

The most important attack, however, was the series of murders carried out by the Tupamaros on 14 April. In the early morning, the terrorist group executed three soldiers who were travelling in a car. Corvette captain Ernesto Motto was also killed that morning while leaving his house, and professor Armando Acosta y Lara was shot dead by a sniper outside his home. The Tupamaros also tried to kill Miguel Sofía, an alleged leader of the Death Squads. In the failed operation, two tupamaros were killed and policeman Juan Carlos Reyes was severely wounded. (Note: The killed soldiers were named Óscar Delega, Carlos Leites and Segundo Goñi. The two tupamaros were Norma Pagliano and Nicolás Groop.)

The same day, the Joint Forces broke into the home of tupamaros Luis Martirena and Ivette Jiménez, who were killed afterwards. Eleuterio Fernández Huidobro and David Cámpora, who were hiding at the house, were jailed after the operation. The Army broke into another house later that day, in an operation in which four people were killed.

13 murders were carried out in total. Later that day, the Police Forces invaded the headquarters of the Communist Party of Uruguay, of the March 26 Movement and of the Christian Democratic Party. President Juan María Bordaberry announced through cadena nacional that he would ask the Parliament to declare the country in a state of civil war the following day. The event was labeled as the "day of blood", and not only marked the beginning of the primacy of the Armed Forces in the counterterrorist campaign, but also decreased dramatically the popularity of the guerillas. Fernández Huidobro would later admit that the offensive had been a "serious mistake".

Senate after the 1971 general election, with representatives from the Broad Front, Colorados and Blancos.

The next day, in the Parliamentary session that would discuss the declaration, senator Enrique Erro read a series of documents compiled by the Tupamaros, called the "Actas de Bardesio", in which the guerrilla justified the previous day killings by claiming that those executed were directive figures of the far-right Death Squads. The report, allegedly written by a photographer kidnapped by the Tupamaros, accused the government of approving the actions of the Squads, which it responsibilized for the forced disappearance of tupamaro Héctor Castagnetto. The work claimed that the photographer had witnessed as a member of the Squads how Castagnetto was personally tortured by Miguel Sofía and other important figures, and stated that two Brazilian policemen had been involved in the operation. The photographer would later tell police that his statements were false and were obtained under psychological torture.

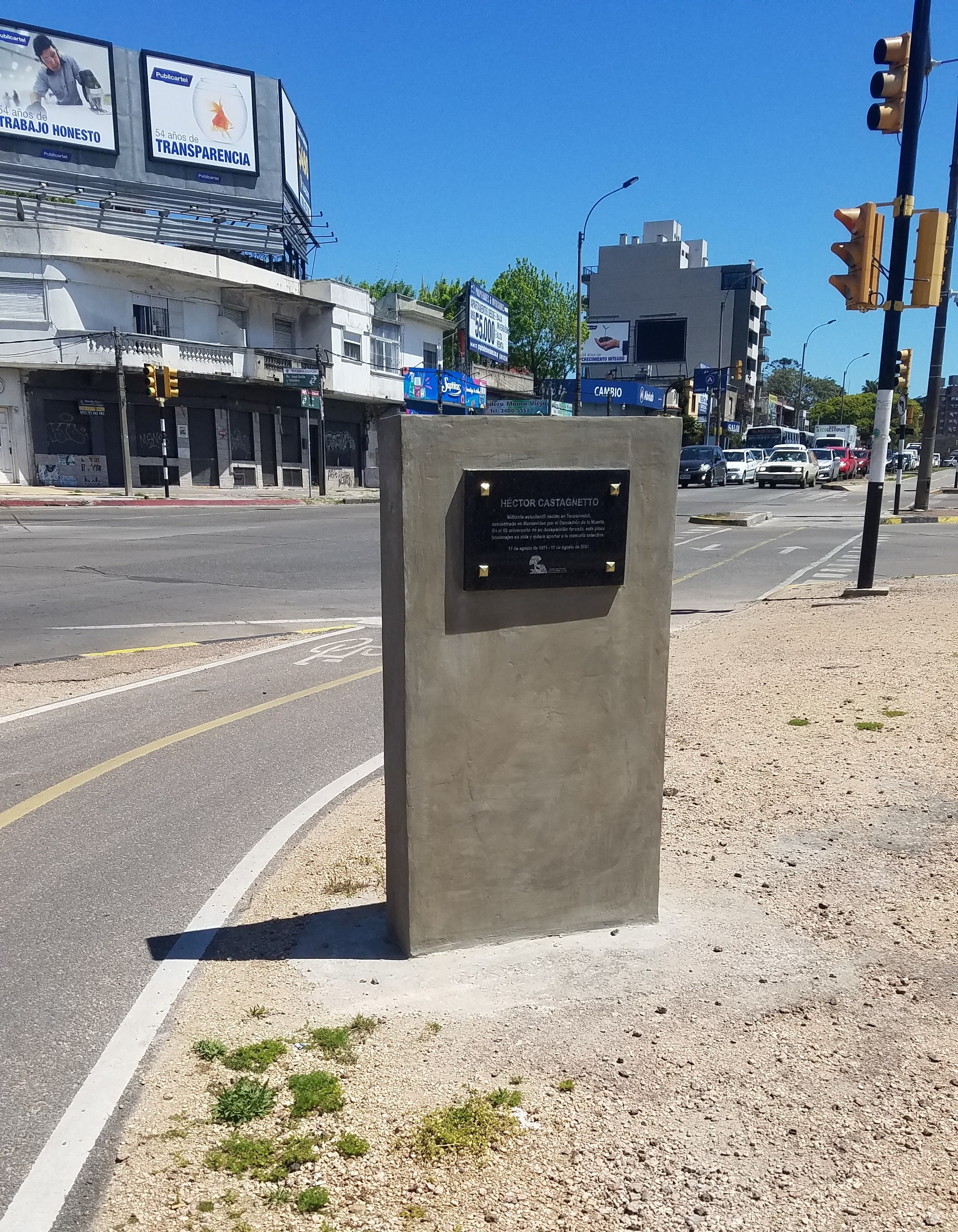
Commemorative plaque at the place of disappearance of Héctor Castagnetto.

Nevertheless, the public image of the Tupamaros was greatly damaged after the events. The movement had already informed communist senator Rodney Arismendi that they were prepared to start waging full-scale war against the Army on 14 April, an initiative which the MP deemed "insane". The Parliament voted in favor of the declaration, with the support of both Blanco and Colorado representatives. A series of far-right terrorist attacks were carried out during the session: the embassy of the Soviet Union and the house of various left-wing figures were stormed, and a group of young men who insulted Broad Front politicians from the stands of the Parliament later attempted to beat up Erro. Highschool classes were cancelled for 10 days. After a period of enforced martial law, the state of civil war was replaced by the definitive State Security Law.

== Operations and development ==
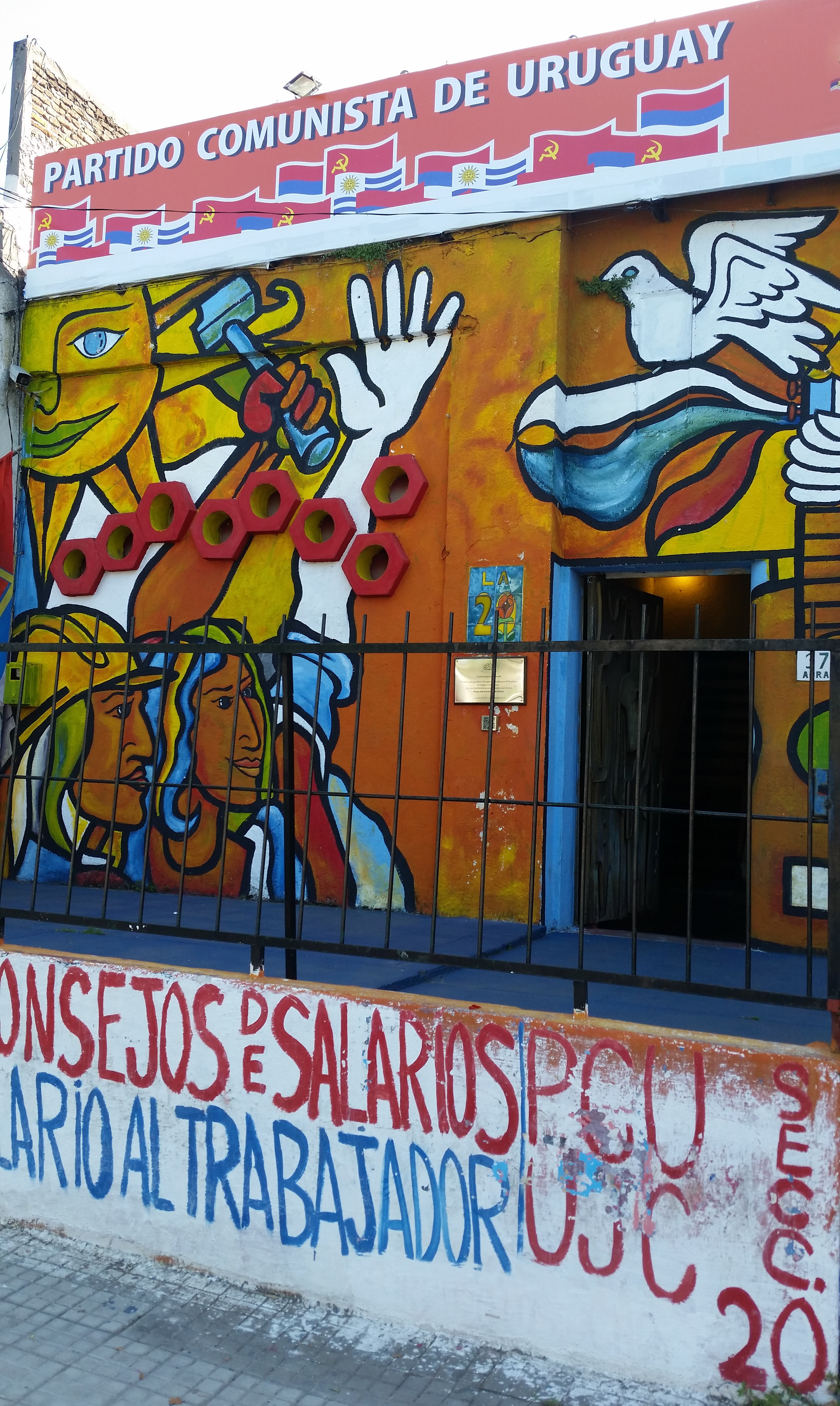
Communist Party headquarters where the 17 April events took place.

On 17 April the Joint Forces carried out an operation against the Communist Party, in which a policeman and eight communists were killed. The army claimed that the activists had shot first, while the Communist Party stated that the procedure had the killing of the activists as an explicit motivation considering the incoherences in the official version.

After an event of friendly fire in which two soldiers died during a procedure, Bordaberry was advised by the intelligence agency to reassemble the military leadership. Generals Gregorio Álvarez and Ramón Trabal, leaders of the Joint Chiefs of Staff and of the Information Service, drafted a plan aimed at "winning the war", based on cutting off supplies to the guerrillas by a strict social surveillance, an extensive work of counterintelligence, and the sabotage of Tupamaro recruitment campaigns.

The military kept carrying out search and seizure procedures all over the country, what led to shootouts in Fray Bentos and Mercedes which left two soldiers severely wounded. On 24–25 April, seven tupamaros were detained in Dolores and other one was killed. Four days later, left-wing general Líber Seregni gave a speech calling for peace, stating that "if we are at war, there are two ways to end it: either through dialogue or through extermination" and called for a "just" agreement between the government and the guerrillas.

Bordaberry was infuriated by the speech, and gave an aggressive address through cadena nacional against the "wolves in sheep's clothing" who pretended to be "apostles of peace", emphasizing on the duty of the state to destroy the guerrillas. The president manifested his desire for peace, but stated that "authentic and lasting" peace required the "good faith and honesty of those who invoke it". Bordaberry criticized the Broad Front as hypocritical, stressing that the party had previously justified terrorist violence and embraced ideologically intolerant beliefs, and celebrated ironically that "it is never too late to sit at the peace table". However, the president argued, the death of policemen and of guerrilla fighters were not equal and, due to respect for the first ones, the conflict was to be resumed.

By the end of April, guerrillas had killed 5 people and perpetrated 37 terrorist attacks (22 against buildings and 15 against vehicles), 10 Tupamaros and 7 communists had been executed by the Joint Forces, 64 people had been imprisoned and 11 terrorist hideouts had been discovered, of which 3 were located in the countryside.

The guerrillas continued their attacks. On 9 May, the OPR-33 kidnapped the businessman Hugo Molaguero, who was released in August after being subject to "inhumane treatment". Soon after, the government detained Tupamaro leaders Mario Píriz Budes and Mauricio Rosencof. On 18 May, the MLN-T attempted a terrorist attack against the commander-in-chief of the Army, Florencio Gravina, in which four soldiers who served as guards were shot dead inside their jeep. José Mujica defined the killings as "a typical war action" at the "home of the top commander of an Army that was at war", while a military chief stated that "not even in wars people are killed this way". (Note: The killed soldiers were called Saúl Correa, Osiris Núñez, Gaudencio Núñez and Ramos Jesús Ferreira.) The murder of four soldiers on the national Armed Forces Day was particularly significant, as it managed to convince the sectors of the army that resisted its new role to continue with the fight.

On 13 May an official report by the Army announced that the Joint Forces had successfully detained 256 people, 70 long weapons and 500 short ones had been seized and 40 hideouts had been discovered. Since the declaration of the war, 18 people had been killed. On 16 May 16 tupamaros were arrested at Treinta y Tres. On 22 May, the Joint Forces broke into an abandoned "Jail of the People" (Spanish: Cárcel del Pueblo) at Constitución street, a facility used as a prison for clandestine tortures and kidnaps by the Tupamaros, as well as into their explosives factory, and discovered one of their undercover infirmaries the following day.

The same day accusations of torture in Uruguayan barracks were presented at the senate. Two days later, the claims were confirmed when young Christian-democratic activist Luis Carlos Batalla was beaten to death at a military facility in Treinta y Tres. The minister of Defense was later interpelled by the Parliament.

The main Jail of the People, which remained in activity, was discovered on 26 May and its two prisoners, Ulysses Pereira Reverbel and Carlos Frick Davie were released. The jail was placed below a normal house in which a family lived. The Army had engaged in search and seizure in nearby homes, and carried out a large-scale operation for the release of the hostages. The guards of the prison were given the order to execute the prisoners if the government found the facilities, but they ignored it. The fall of the Jail was a huge morality blow to the Tupamaro movement, to the point that leading guerrilla figures like Amodio Pérez or Mariano Píriz Budes started collaborating secretly with the Joint Forces to save their lives. These defections were central for the disbandment of the movement soon after.

The Tupamaro movement was quickly neutralized afterwards. On 27 May numerous tupamaros were arrested at Paysandú. On 31 May 20 alleged guerrilla fighters were arrested at Melo, other 7 were detained at Maldonado, 10 at Paso de los Toros, 8 at San José and 43 at Artigas. On 13 June, the Tupamaros' Paysandú branch was completely defeated after an operation that killed 3 men and imprisoned 94. Later that month, 59 suspected fighters were detained at Treinta y Tres, 49 at Artigas, 68 remnants of the Paysandú branch, 19 at Salto and 12 at Florida. In July, 45 tupamaros were arrested at Paso de los Toros, 34 at Florida and 39 at Río Negro. The perpetrators of the murders of Delega and Acosta y Lara, of the kidnap of Molaguero and of the massacre at Gravina's house were arrested as well that month. In August, 31 fighters surrendered at Paysandú, 13 were arrested at Salto and 13 others were captured at Colonia. Despite the Tupamaros counterattacked and killed 7 people, the movement had been almost completely dismantled by the crackdown and lost any real possibility of seizing power. Among the seven murdered was the brother of Gregorio Álvarez, colonel Artigas Álvarez, who was shot dead in front of his family while taking his children to school. The public outrage and protests sparked by the case, as Álvarez was widely seen as a moderate figure with no ties to torture procedures, caused a radicalization of the Army's counterterrorism policies: after Álvarez's murderer was arrested in August, the Joint Forces beat him into a coma. The tupamaro's family later claimed that, by order of Gregorio Álvarez, the fighter had been denied food and medical care once hospitalized, what had eventually killed him 17 days later.

== Outcome and negotiations ==
=== State Security Law ===
The state of war was formally replaced by the State Security Law on 10 July, but the conflict continued and the crackdown went even further. The Law gave the army even more power to defeat the guerrillas, created new crimes and gave a wider jurisdiction to military courts. The SSL also officially allowed the army to hold prisoners at their barracks.

=== Failed negotiations ===
On 26 June, by order of Bordaberry, the government arranged a meeting with imprisoned Tupamaro leaders, and offered to accept their unconditional surrender. Cristi and Álvarez had communicated to the president on the previous day that the Tupamaros were willing to surrender in exchange for a series of political and economic reforms, as well as for being condemned to prison farms, but Bordaberry rejected the proposal and asked for their full demobilization and later unconditional judgement. After the meeting, Fernández Huidobro was sent by the government to negotiate the surrender with the Tupamaro leaders who were not arrested yet. The commanders openly rejected the state proposal and wrote their own project, which included a large amount of laws to be approved in exchange for the groups demobilization. After the rejection of the proposal by the Army, Raúl Sendic went personally to negotiate at the military facilities, but he was informed that the negotiations had been stopped by order of the government.

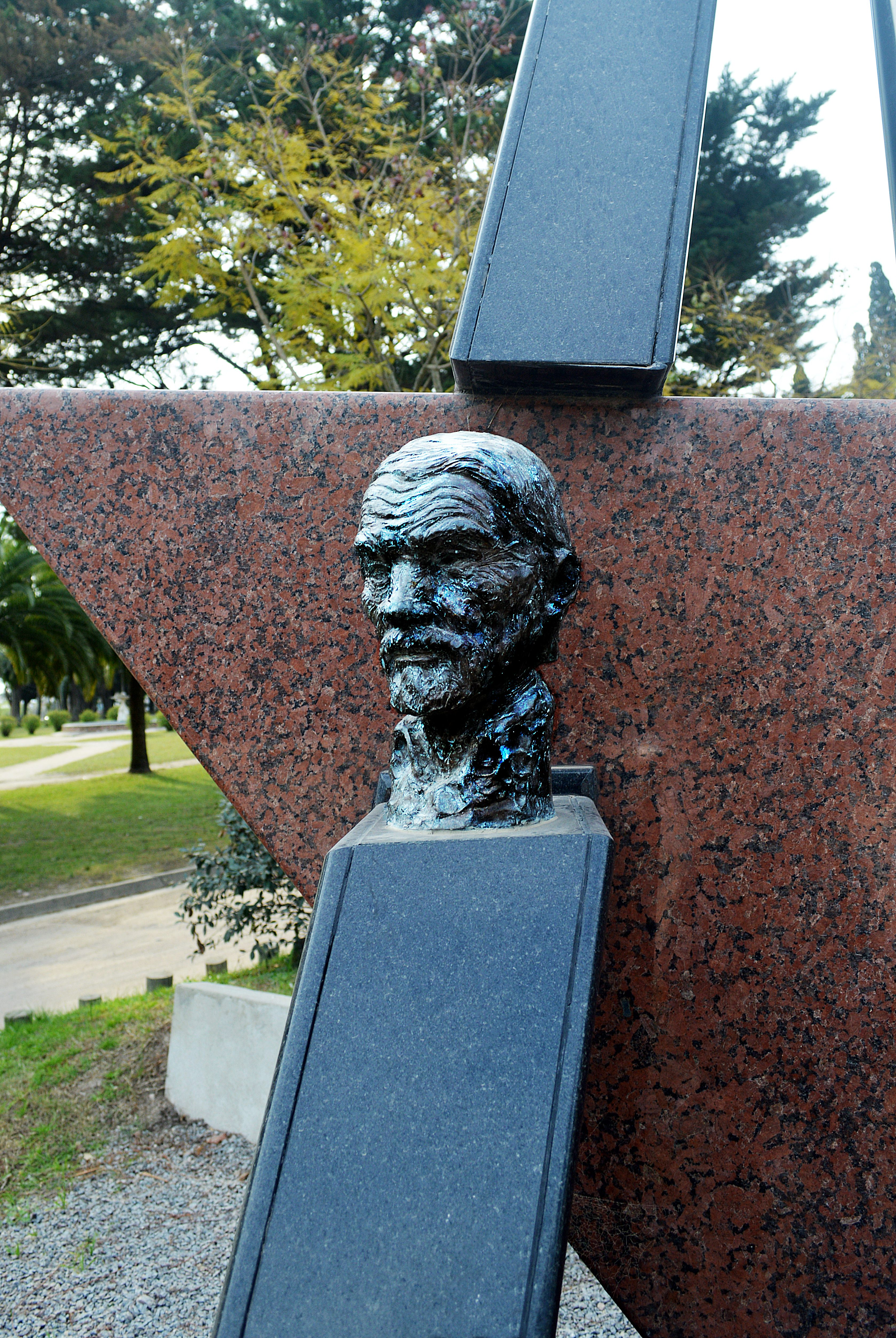
Monument to Raúl Sendic at Trinidad, Flores.

After the official refusal, the Tupamaros tried to start a political scandal and organized a public meeting of the March 26 Movement in which the population was informed that the Army was negotiating with guerrilla fighters at military facilities. (Note: The 26 March Movement is an active political party, member of the Popular Unity coalition. Back then, it served as the political wing of the Tupamaros within the Broad Front coalition under the name of "Independents' March 26 Movement".) The top military commanders issued a statement denying any involvement, but evidence of the events was presented at the Parliament and caused general outrage. Despite other attempts of negotiation were briefly tried, they were cancelled abruptly. The Army executed three imprisoned tupamaros, and the guerrillas reacted by murdering colonel Álvarez. The short truce between both sides was definitively over, armed violence intensified and tortures became more common short after.

Sendic, the last tupamaro leader who had not yet been caught, tried to continue negotiating with General Julio Marenales, but stopped after the killing of another fighter. Sendic was finally imprisoned on 1 September. The movement, however, was not dissolved and kept taking part in political and armed actions after the capture of Sendic. The Tupamaros remained active in Uruguay until November 1973, and later operated in exile. A few thousands of tupamaro exiles remained in Argentina, Cuba and Chile, and tried to organize a return to the country. After some attempts of international coordination, the isolation and lack of communication between cells caused the failure of the project.

== See also ==
- Cuban Revolution
- Dirty War
- Guatemalan Civil War
- Operation Condor

== Bibliography ==
- Lessa, Alfonso (2007). La revolución imposible: los tupamaros y el fracaso de la vía armada en el Uruguay del siglo XX (in Spanish) (2nd ed.). Montevideo: Fin de Siglo. ISBN 978-9974-7784-9-8.
- Maiztegui Casas, Lincoln (2008). Orientales: Una Historia política del Uruguay (in Spanish). Vol. 4 (1st ed.). Montevideo: Editorial Planeta. ISBN 978-9974-643-70-3.
- Sanguinetti, Julio María (2008). La agonía de una democracia (in Spanish) (3rd ed.). Montevideo: Taurus. ISBN 978-9974-95-276-8.
