= Jopp =

Jopp is a surname. Notable people with the surname include:

- James Jopp, provost of Aberdeen
- Patrick Jopp (born 1962), Swiss archer
- Victor Jopp (1887–1965), Canadian ice hockey player

== See also ==
- JOP (disambiguation)
- Jopp Group
- Jupp (surname)
