= Anti-imperialist Unitary Commissions =

Anti-imperialist Artiguist Unitary Commissions for National Liberation and Socialism Comisiones Unitarias Antiimperialistas Artiguistas por la Liberación Nacional y el Socialismo
- Leader: Mario Rossi Garretano
- Founded: 2008
- Ideology: Communism; Marxism-Leninism; Guevarism; Revolutionary socialism; Artiguism; Anti-imperialism
- Political position: Far-left
- Slogan: Por la unidad sin exclusiones de la Izquierda antimperialista y socialista.

Website
- comuna.nuevaradio.org

Anti-imperialist Unitary Commissions (Spanish: Comisiones Unitarias Antiimperialistas, COMUNA) is a far-left Marxist–Leninist political alliance in Uruguay founded in 2008 that describes itself as revolutionary left, class-conscious, anti-imperialist and anticapitalist.

Having failed at the admission to the 2009 election, it negotiated a cooperation with the leftist Popular Unity, but abandoned the talks and finally didn't participate in the 2014 general election either.

== History ==
=== Formation ===
The alliance with the full name Anti-imperialist Artiguist Unitary Commissions for National Liberation and Socialism (Spanish: Comisiones Unitarias Antiimperialistas Artiguistas por la Liberación Nacional y el Socialismo) was founded in 2008 when a number of member parties of the governing Broad Front alliance defected and joined forces with the Oriental Revolutionary Movement (MRO) in order to jointly contest elections. Among the founding parties were the Movimiento Revolucionario Artiguista (MRA) and the Refundación Comunista (RC) including popular folk musician Yamandú Palacios, the latter party however moving on to yet another newly founded alliance, the Popular Assembly.

=== 2009 elections ===
COMUNA appointed MRO president Mario Rossi Garretano as a single candidate for presidency. With just 266 votes in the internal election primaries the alliance however missed the 500 votes minimum and finally wasn't admitted to the October 2009 general election. Finally a recommendation was issued to vote blank, yet support the referendum aiming at abolishing the Law on the Expiration of the Punitive Claims of the State.

=== 2014 elections ===
Ahead of the 2014 general election, COMUNA negotiated joining forces with Popular Assembly in forming the larger Popular Unity alliance. In April 2013 it however decided to leave the coordination referring to fundamental differences. With a sufficiently promising alliance out of sight, COMUNA finally decided not to participate in the election at all, again recommending to vote blank instead. It however urged electors to turn down the referendum aiming at a lowered age of criminal responsibility.
