= Death squads in Uruguay =

Alleged Uruguayan far-right paramilitary organization

Death Squads
- Escuadrones de la Muerte
- Skull and bones flag, commonly associated with Latin American death squads during the Cold War.
- Dates active: Early 1970s
- Country: Uruguay
- Ideology: Anti-communism; Ultranationalism
- Political position: Far-right
- Wars: Uruguayan intrastate war

The Death Squads were a group of far-right paramilitary associations which carried out extrajudicial killings and other criminal actions in Uruguay in the years previous to the civic-military dictatorship. Their existence and power have been disputed.

== Background ==
The paramilitary Squads were not a unified group. The movement carried out its operations through different organizations and names, namely the:

- Comando Caza Tupamaros
- Comando Dan A. Mitrione
- Defensa Armada Nacionalista
- Comando Armando Leses
- Brigadas Nacionales
- MANO
- Escuadrón de Justicia Oriental.

The main sources of information about the Squads are the "Actas de Bardesio" (lit: Proceedings of Bardesio), a document disclosed by the Tupamaros. The proceedings were written after the abduction of photographer Nelson Bardesio, an alleged member of the group who confessed the Squads' activities and motives. According to Bardesio, the Death Squads were a total of 5 groups and had the approval of the Ministry of the Interior. The Squads would have been organized and promoted by important politicians and military personnel. The proceedings also point to the involvement of Paraguayan and Brazilian citizens in the organizations. Bardesio would later deny his claims before the police and state he had spoken under psychological torture.

A policeman, Nelson Mario Benítez Saldivia, confessed his participation in the Death Squads during a parliamentary investigation on the subject in May 1972. Benítez claimed to have been recruited by Bardesio for a "commando" involved in "terrorist actions", of which he was informed at Buenos Aires. He resigned the project soon after understanding its full implications, and claimed to have been detained for some days afterwards. Nevertheless, Benítez stated he was not informed of the involvement of the Squads in extrajudicial killings, and claimed he could only learn of small-scale attacks against left-wing figures' homes in which nobody was harmed.

A 1972 declassified document from the United States Department of State stated that four Tupamaros had been killed by the Death Squads in the context of counterterrorist operations.

== See also ==
- Juventud Uruguaya de Pie
- Uruguayan intrastate war
- Vanguards of the Fatherland
