= George Jupp =

George Jupp may refer to:

- George Jupp (cricketer, born 1845) (1845–1930), English cricketer
- George Jupp (cricketer, born 1875) (1875–1938), English cricketer
