= Jeff Wilson =

Jeff Wilson may refer to:

- Jeff Wilson (footballer) (born 1964), English footballer
- Jeff Wilson (sportsman) (born 1973), New Zealand rugby and cricket player
- Jeff Wilson (Canadian politician) (born c. 1978), Canadian politician
- Jeff Wilson (Washington politician), member of the Washington Senate
- Jeff Wilson (racing driver), British auto racing driver
- Jeff Wilson (professor), American professor and academic dumpster diver
- Jeff Wilson (American football) (born 1995), American football player
- Jeff Wilson (Vermont politician), member of the Vermont House of Representatives
- Jeff Wyatt Wilson, American film director, screenwriter and producer
- Jeff Wilson (born 1983/84), American contestant on Survivor: Palau
- Jeff Wilson (fl. 2000s), American musician, past member of band Nachtmystium

== See also ==
- Jeffrey Wilson (disambiguation)
- Geoff Wilson (disambiguation)
