= 1912–13 Toronto Hockey Club season =

NHA hockey team season (inaugural season)

1912–13 Toronto Hockey Club
- 1912–13 record: 9–11–0
- Home record: 7–3–0
- Road record: 2–8–0
- Goals for: 86
- Goals against: 95

Team information
- General manager: Bruce Ridpath
- Coach: Bruce Ridpath; Jack Marshall (Jan-)
- Arena: Arena Gardens

The 1912–13 Toronto Hockey Club season was the first season of the Toronto franchise in the National Hockey Association (NHA). The team was also known as the Blueshirts.

== Team business ==
Operation of the ice-making equipment at the new Arena Gardens was delayed a week when the pipes had to be relaid. Local pipefitters, unfamiliar with ice-making equipment, had installed the pipes improperly, and W. H. Magee of New York, advisor to the Arena, ordered the pipes removed and reinstalled.

== Off-season ==
The Torontos' manager Bruce Ridpath built the team from new prospects, rather than signing established professionals, like the Tecumsehs, the other Toronto NHA club. Ridpath signed Scotty Davidson, who had been playing in Calgary; Frank Foyston of the Toronto Eatons, Roy McGiffin of the Simcoes, Cully Wilson of Winnipeg, and Harry Cameron and Frank Nighbor of Port Arthur. Only Archie McLean from the PCHA had previous big-league experience.

== Regular season ==
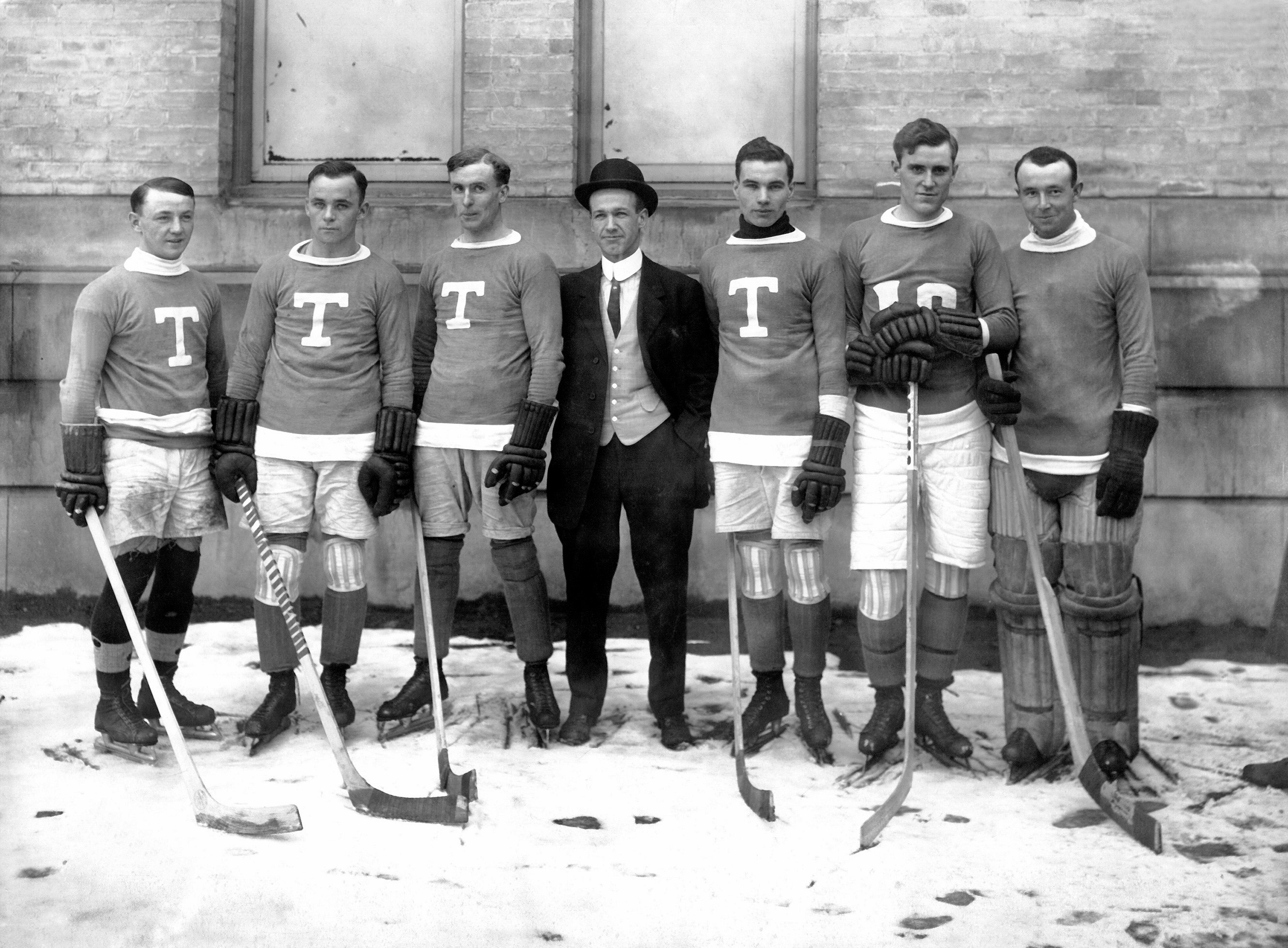
Members of the 1912–13 Toronto Blueshirts Cully Wilson, Harry Cameron, Frank Foyston, Bruce Ridpath (manager), Frank Nighbor, Archie McLean, Hap Holmes

Cully Wilson scored the first-ever goal for the Torontos, in their opening night 9–5 loss to the Canadiens. The team started the season poorly under the coaching of Ridpath, but Ridpath signed Jack Marshall, the former star of the Montreal Wanderers as coach. The team continued to struggle until Marshall decided to become a playing coach with the team. His veteran presence helped the Blueshirts to win some games, eventually finishing third in the standings.

Nighbor was the scoring star for the Blueshirts, scoring 23 goals.

=== Final standings ===
National Hockey Association
	GP	W	L	T	GF	GA
Quebec Bulldogs	20	16	4	0	112	75
Montreal Wanderers	20	10	10	0	93	90
Toronto Hockey Club	20	9	11	0	86	95
Montreal Canadiens	20	9	11	0	83	81
Ottawa Senators	20	9	11	0	87	81
Toronto Tecumsehs	20	7	13	0	59	98

Note: W = Wins, L = Losses, T = Ties, GF= Goals For, GA = Goals Against

== Schedule and results ==
#	Date	Visitor	Score	Home	Record	Pts
1	December 25	Montreal Canadiens	9–5	Toronto	0–1–0	0
2	December 28	Toronto	5–8	Montreal Canadiens	0–2–0	0
3	January 1	Toronto	1–7	Ottawa Senators	0–3–0	0
4	January 4	Montreal Wanderers	3–5	Toronto	1–3–0	2
5	January 8	Toronto	5–10	Quebec Bulldogs	1–4–0	2
6	January 11	Toronto	2–5	Toronto Tecumsehs	1–5–0	2
7	January 15	Toronto Tecumsehs	1–6	Toronto	2–5–0	4
8	January 18	Toronto	1–3	Montreal Wanderers	2–6–0	4
9	January 22	Quebec Bulldogs	3–6	Toronto	3–6–0	6
10	January 25	Ottawa Senators	9–5	Toronto	3–7–0	6
11	February 1	Toronto	2–3	Montreal Wanderers	3–8–0	6
12	February 5	Ottawa Senators	0–2	Toronto	4–8–0	8
13	February 8	Montreal Canadiens	3–5	Toronto	5–8–0	10
14	February 12	Quebec Bulldogs	11–2	Toronto	5–9–0	10
15	February 15	Montreal Wanderers	3–10	Toronto	6–9–0	12
16	February 19	Toronto	7–3	Toronto Tecumsehs	7–9–0	14
17	February 22	Toronto Tecumsehs	3–5	Toronto	8–9–0	16
18	February 26	Toronto	4–6	Quebec Bulldogs	8–10–0	16
19	March 1	Toronto	2–3	Ottawa Senators	8–11–0	16
20	March 5	Toronto	6–2	Montreal Canadiens	9–11–0	18

Source: Coleman 1966

== Player stats ==
Player	Pos.	No.	GP	G	A	Pts	PIM
Frank Nighbor	C	9	19	23	2	25	13
Scotty Davidson	RW	3	20	20	2	22	69
Cully Wilson	RW	5	19	12	3	15	45
Harry Cameron	D	2	20	10	2	12	20
Frank Foyston	C	4	16	8	3	11	8
Roy McGiffin	LW	11	15	7	1	8	83
Jack Marshall	C		13	3	1	4	8
Archie McLean	D	10	9	2	0	2	4
Steve Gunnlaugson	F		3	1	0	1	0
Fred Doherty	RW	6	1	0	0	0	0
Victor Jopp	F	8	1	0	0	0	0
Mickey O'Leary	C		1	0	0	0	0
Ken Randall	RW	12	2	0	0	0	0
Jack Walker	F	7	1	0	0	0	0

Source: Society for International Hockey Research (SIHR)

== See also ==
- 1912–13 NHA season
