= JUP =

JUP may refer to:

- JUP (gene), a gene on chromosome 17
- Janata Unnayan Party, an Indian political party
- Jamiat Ulema-e-Pakistan, a Political Party of Pakistan
- Jupiter Fund Management, a British fund management group
- Juventud Uruguaya de Pie, a former Uruguayan far-right student organization

== People with the name ==
- Jup Weber (1950-2021), Luxembourgish politician

== See also ==
- Jupp (disambiguation)
- Jupe (disambiguation)
- jup, ISO 639 code of the Hup language of the Amazon
