= Jupp =

Jupp may refer to:

- Jupp (given name), a German masculine given name
- Jupp (surname), a surname
- jupp, a cross-platform text editor forked from Joe's Own Editor

== See also ==
- Jup (disambiguation)
