= Lieutenants of Artigas =

Uruguayan far-right secret society

The Legion of the Lieutenants of Artigas (Spanish: Legión Tenientes de Artigas) is an active ultranationalist secret society in the Uruguayan Army. Originally styled as a "lodge" despite not holding any relationship with freemasonry, it later abandoned the term.

== Background ==
Explicitly anti-communist and anti-masonic, the secret society was founded by generals Mario Aguerrondo and Julio Tanco in 1964 on an intent to counter "marxist infiltration" in the Uruguayan armed forces. The Legion has been active since its foundation and was particularly relevant during the Uruguayan Dictatorship, despite none of the four dictators were members of the lodge. (Note: Uruguayan presidents Juan María Bordaberry, Aparicio Méndez and Alberto Demicheli could not belong to the Legion as they were civilians. Gregorio Álvarez, the only military dictator of the regime, was not a member either.) The movement is deeply anti-liberal and anti-batllist, and rejects the separation of powers and of Church and state.

The society has experienced periods of growth and decline, being particularly powerful during the constitutional governments of Lacalle Herrera and the Broad Front, and experiencing a relative decay during both presidencies of Julio María Sanguinetti.

The Legion is anti-political and shows contempt towards professional politicians, labeling them as corrupt. Lieutenants favour a larger involvement of the armed forces on the political leadership of the country. The lodge's ideology is based on nationalism and political Catholicism, and most of its original members were close to the National Party. On their initiation ceremony, Lieutenants must make an oath before the Artigas flag to "respect and obey the orders of the military lodge and serve the fatherland". Aguerrondo defined the Lieutenants as being "not nazi nor fascist" but only "easterners and doctrinaire nationalists".

The movement can be placed amid many other military secret societies created in Latin America during the 20th century with the goal of preventing the propagation of communism among military officers.

Uruguayan politician Guido Manini Ríos has been accused of being a member of the Legion. This would make him the first Lieutenant to hold the commander-in-chief office since the transition to democracy.

== See also ==
- Artiguist Legion
- Fascism in Uruguay
- United Officers' Group
- Vanguards of the Fatherland
