= Artiguist Legion =

Uruguayan political movement

- Legión Artiguista
- Flag of Artigas
- Leaders: Raúl G. Sartorio; Vicente Vivas Chappe; Juan A. da Costa
- Founded: 1961
- Split to: Tricolour Vanguard (1963)
- Ideology: Initially: Anti-communism; Artiguism; Conservatism; Economic nationalism Militarism; Later; Anti-democracy; Authoritarianism; Corporate statism
- Political position: Originally right-wing, later far-right
- Status: Defunct

The Artiguist Legion (Spanish: Legión Artiguista) was an anti-communist social and political movement in Uruguay.

The Legion claimed to follow the ideology of the Uruguayan national hero José Gervasio Artigas from a "practical and constructive" point of view, based on social action across the country. The movement was born mainly as a social organization concerned with social justice and patriotic propaganda, despite it gradually shifted towards more extremist right-wing views.

Legionaries were radically opposed to communism from a nationalist point of view, considering it the "most outright denial of the ideas and struggles of Artigas". The movement was anti-liberal as well, and supported economic nationalism against the liberalizing policies promoted by the government. Despite supporting liberal democracy, the movement was in favour of the proscription of the Communist Party.

== Ideology and early years ==
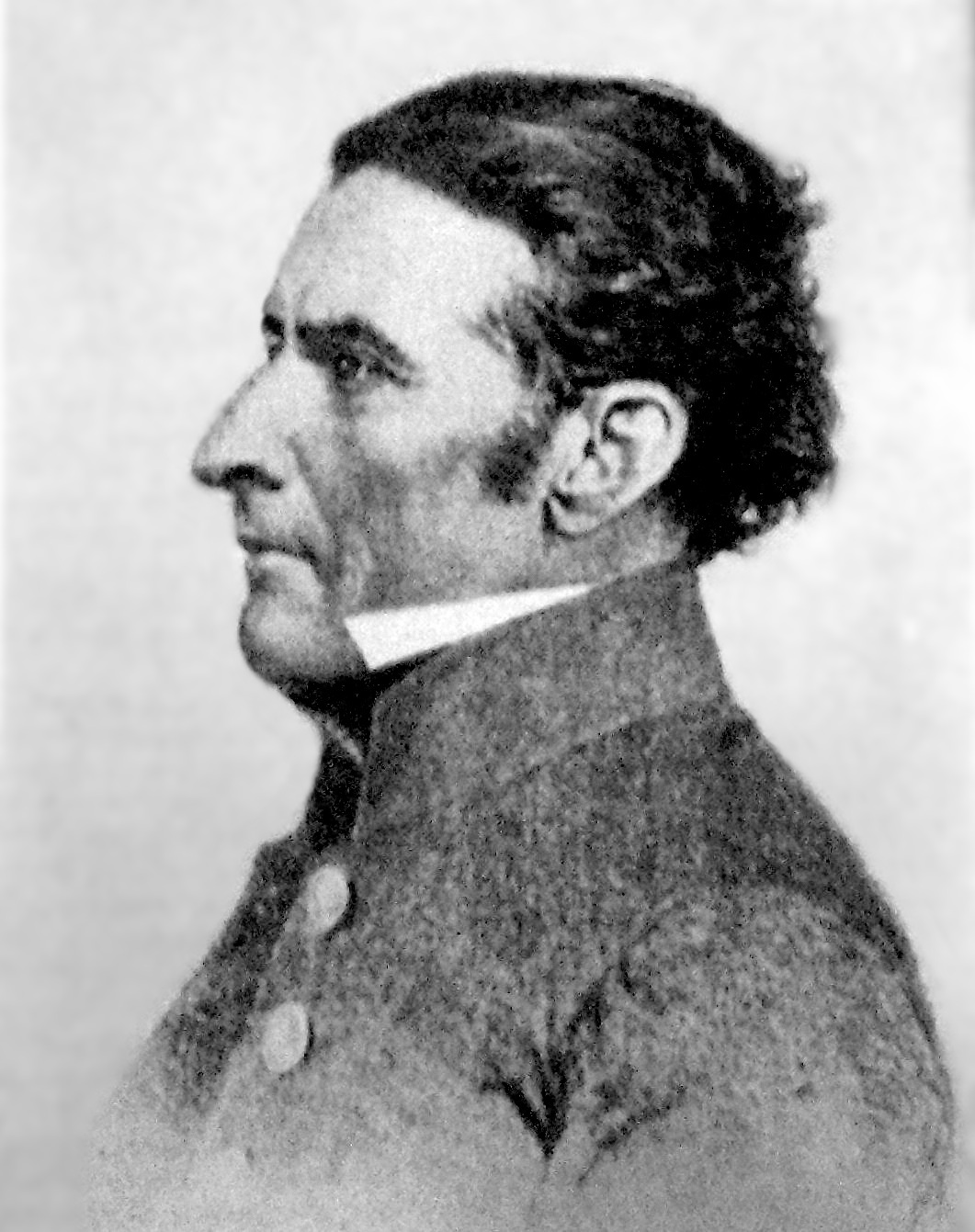
José Gervasio Artigas by Juan Manuel Blanes.

The Legion was founded as the Eastern Artiguist Legion in 1961, but only became an important nationwide movement in 1963. Its members were mostly civilians, despite most of its founders and leading figures were retired military personnel. Raúl Sartorio, an army sergeant expulsed under accusations of nazi propaganda, served as Secretary General of the movement, while the presidency of the Legion was held by captain Vicente Vivas Chappe. The movement had a wide presence in the national police and armed forces.

One of the main concerns of the movement was a perceived "laziness" of the Uruguayan people, which was seen by legionaries as promoted by trade unionism and civil service. In a context of deep economic crisis, the Legion called its members to "produce more and better" as that was the "only economic miracle" the country was to search for. Legionaries despised trade unionists as "professional agitators" who were not representative of the general opinions of the working class and were supported and financed by "foreign forces". The organization was opposed to the economically liberal policies carried out by the National Party, and adopted an anti-political rhetoric based on the unableness of professional politicians to counter communist revolutionaries appropriately. The Legion developed a counter-revolutionary rhetoric and promoted the undertaking of legal reforms that would make the state more effective in order to defend itself against foreign enemies.

Legionaries carried out a wide number of political campaigns that ranged from the distribution of leaflets, newspapers and flags to television and radiophonic propaganda. The movement was centered in "creating conscience" and resurrecting supposedly lost patriotic and national values based on selflessness and social duty. The Legion believed the crisis was to be solved through a collective self-sacrifice of the "moral forces of the nation" that were to leave gremial and personal interests behind and build a future nation through hard work and collaboration. The organization supported social justice and charity as a way of neutralizing communist claims.

The Legion was initially supported by many relevant figures of the Uruguayan society such as Juana de Ibarbourou, Edgardo Ubaldo Genta or Pedro Berro. All of them were part of the organization's honorary directive board.

== Far-right shift ==
In 1963, the most radical faction of the movement split from the organization and founded the Tricolour Vanguard (Spanish: Vanguardia Tricolor) with the objective of establishing a "Government of National Revolution" through violent means. This revolutionary administration would establish a corporatist developmental state effective for the banishment of communism from the country. In 1964, a complaint of a coup attempt by the Artiguist Legion was presented in Treinta y Tres, what led to a heavy police crackdown on the movement. The existence of the project has been questioned, as most of the interrogued members expressed not being aware of the plot save for those of worst reputation. The movement had already been accused of nazi sympathies by MP Jorge Vila and raised the attention of the parliament after a series of unidentified violent attacks.

The Legion continued its activities after the crackdown, despite its reputation was highly severed. Its rhetoric became closer to the Vanguard's in being outspokenly militarist, anti-democratic and revolutionary, and expressed favourable views of the regime of Humberto Castelo Branco in Brazil. The movement praised the armed forces and the figure of Esteban Cristi (future member of the Lieutenants of Artigas secret society), calling the army to the "hour of the sword" in which a nationalist coup d'état would save the country from communist infiltration and create a "new time" where the oligarchy, the political parties and the bourgeoisie would have been destroyed.
