= Technical University of Applied Sciences Würzburg-Schweinfurt =

Technical university in Germany

Coordinates: 50°02′42″N 10°12′37″E

- Technische Hochschule Würzburg-Schweinfurt
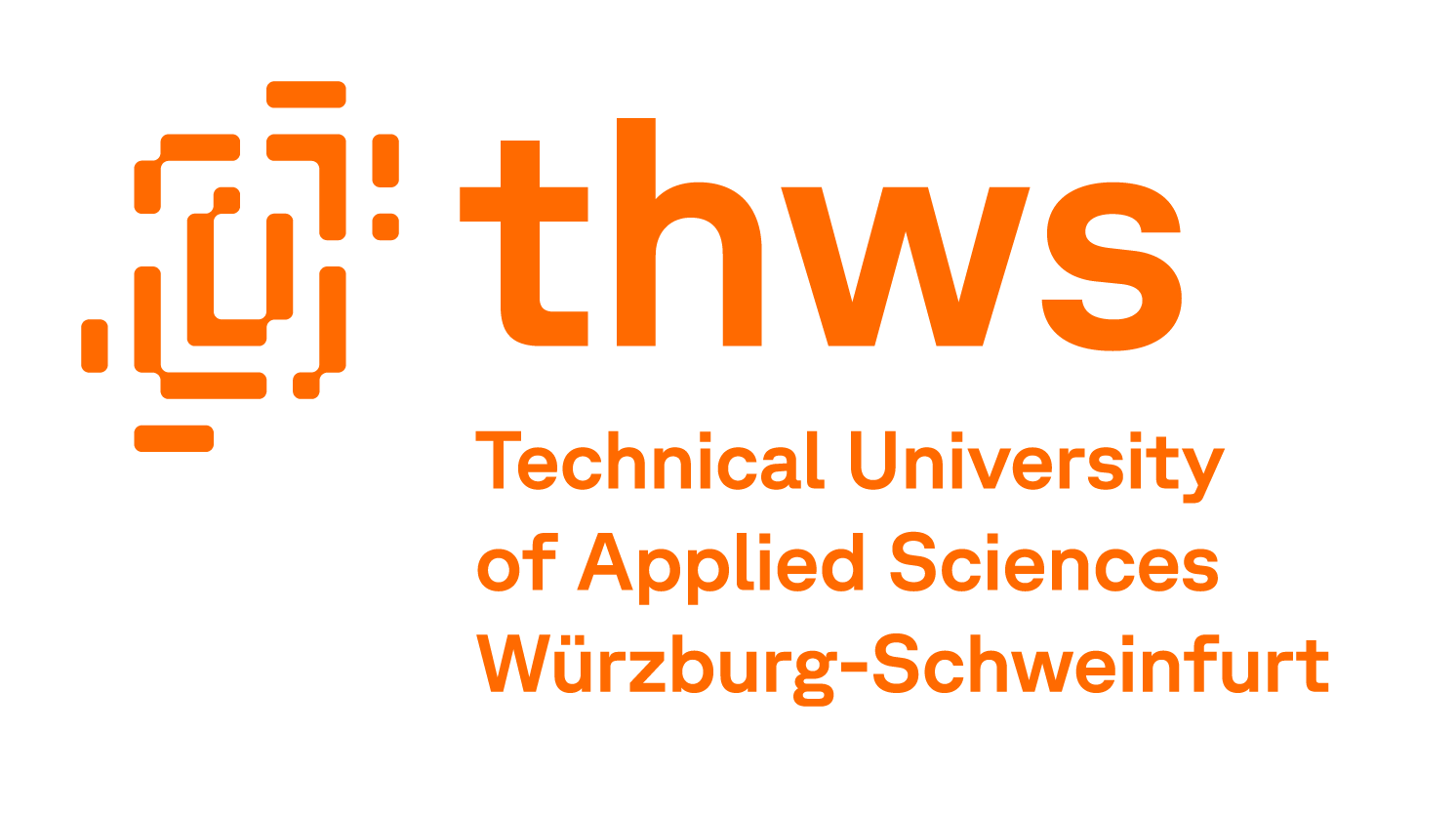
- Logo of the Technical University of Applied Sciences Würzburg-Schweinfurt (Technische Hochschule Würzburg-Schweinfurt)
- Type: Public
- Established: 1807 (Reformed during 1971)
- Endowment: €80 Million - 160 Million
- President: Prof. Dr. Jean Meyer
- Faculty: 328 (2018)
- Administrative staff: 625 (2018)
- Students: 9274 (2018)
- Location: Würzburg & Schweinfurt, Bavaria, Germany
- Colours: Orange, White
- Website: www.thws.de

The Technical University of Applied Sciences Würzburg-Schweinfurt (Technische Hochschule Würzburg-Schweinfurt, abbreviated: THWS) is a technical university in Germany, which was founded originally in 1807, and was restructured during 1971. The university is among the applied sciences universities in Germany with over 150 partner universities worldwide. The university is located in Bavaria with campuses in Würzburg and Schweinfurt.

== History ==
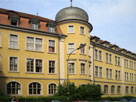
THWS main building in Würzburg city centre, at Sanderring 8

The history of today's University of Applied Sciences Würzburg-Schweinfurt dates back to 1807 and is linked with three previous institutions: the Balthasar-Neuman Polytechnic of the district of Lower Franconia, the Würzburg Commercial College and the Würzburg School of Applied Arts.

Following the passing of the Bavarian Technical University Law of 1970 (Bayerisches Fachhochschulgesetz or FHG), the current university opened its doors on 1. August 1971 with 1566 students and courses in seven subjects. The Würzburg campus offered courses in architecture, civil engineering, business administration and graphic design, while in Schweinfurt students could choose between electrical engineering, mechanical engineering and industrial engineering. In the following years new courses were added including social work (1972), plastics engineering (1973), computer science (1975), nursing management (1995), business economics (1998), Business informatics (2000), media management (2000), computational engineering (2003), logistics (2008) and robotics (2020).

Between 1991 and 2000 the university developed a new campus in Aschaffenburg, initially offering business economics and from 1997 electrical engineering. In 2000, this evolved into the independent University of Applied Sciences Aschaffenburg.

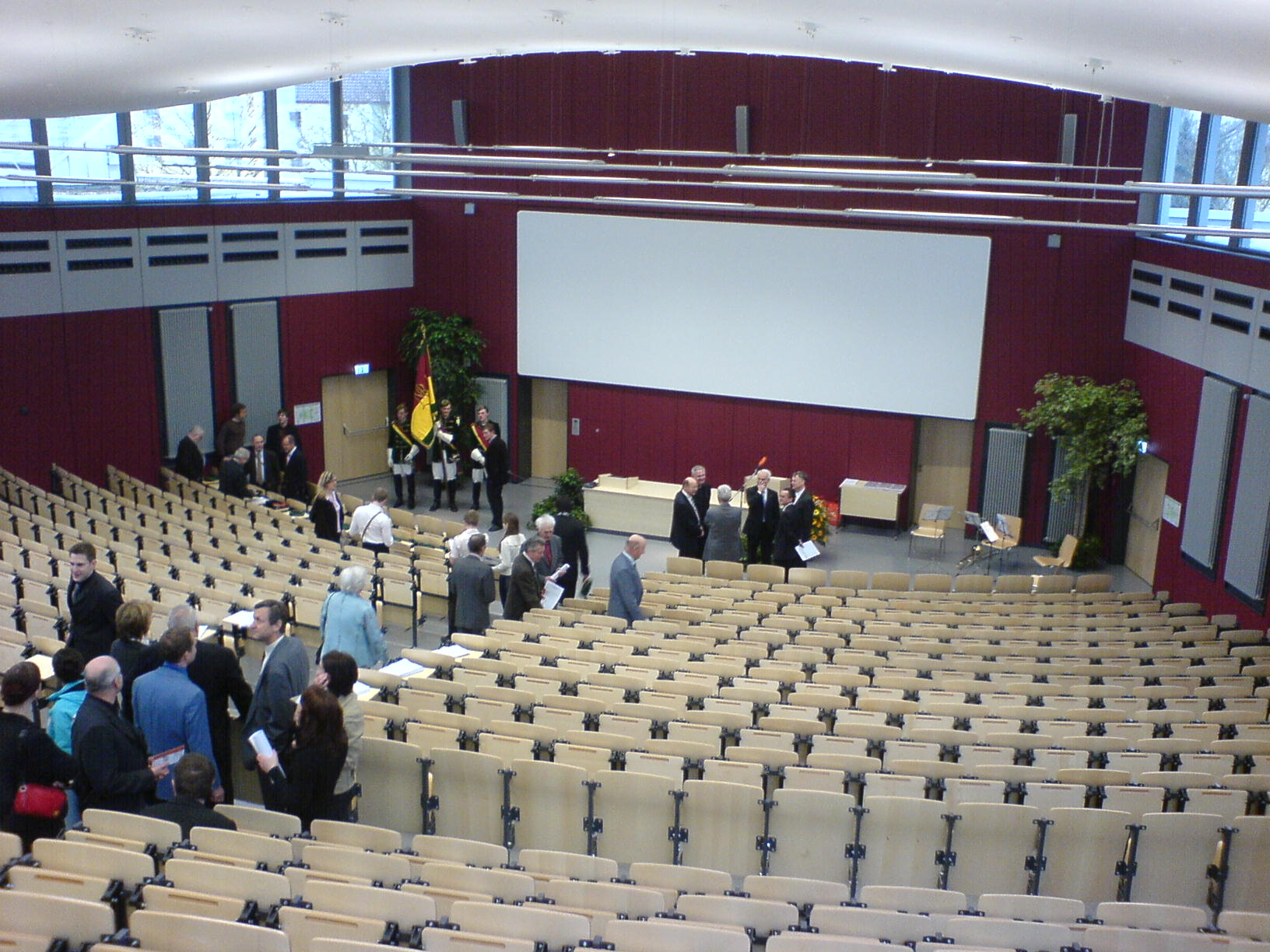
Opening ceremony of the Aula in Schweinfurt

On 14. February 2003, the then minister of science, Hans Zehetmair, laid a foundation for a circular teaching building in Schweinfurt extending to 3000m² and costing almost 14.5 million euros. In the basement of the building there are modern student computer pool rooms. On the first floor a spacious assembly hall (Aula) offers a venue for events and conferences. arranged in a circle around the central space are deans' offices, administrative offices and the largest auditorium of the building. On the second and third floor of the building, constructed of reinforced concrete and aluminium, there are air-conditioned multimedia rooms. The building was opened by the minister of science, Thomas Goppel, on 4. October 2004. Since then, most of the courses in Schweinfurt have been held in these new premises. The older buildings in Schweinfurt have mostly been vacated and since 2004 been extensively refurbished.

In 2008, the name of the university was changed from Fachhochschule Würzburg-Schweinfurt to Hochschule für Angewandte Wissenschaften – Fachhochschule Würzburg-Schweinfurt. On 1 May 2011 the official name of the university became Hochschule für Angewandte Wissenschaften Würzburg-Schweinfurt, and the official English name University of Applied Sciences Würzburg-Schweinfurt. However, the logo with the abbreviation FH|W-S was until the end of 2022.

In 2011 new buildings were acquired in both towns. In Würzburg, the new auditorium and laboratory building in Sanderheinrichsleitenweg was given to the university at the beginning of September 2011. In Schweinfurt, a new building located at Grüner Markt, opposite Kilianskirche was erected by the housing company Stadt- und Wohnbau GmbH (SWG). It cost about 9.6 million euro and the State of Bavaria has rented it from SWG for a minimum of 12 years. As second Schweinfurt campus, it accommodates 720 students in 7 auditoriums. It was officially opened on 10 August 2011.

In 2015, the first English-language TWIN programmes started at the THWS i-Campus. In 2021, a new building of the Faculty of Business and Engineering was erected on Ledward Campus (Campus 3) in Schweinfurt.

On 1 January 2023, the university was accorded the status of a technical university. The name was changed to Technische Hochschule Würzburg-Schweinfurt, abbreviated THWS, with the official English name Technical University of Applied Sciences Würzburg-Schweinfurt. The logo has also been changed from the previous FH|W-S to thws.

== Faculties ==
There are eleven faculties offering more than 50 bachelor's and master's degree programmes in the field of STEM (science, technology, engineering, mathematics), visual design, social sciences, language, and economy/business administration. Six of them are located only in the city of Würzburg, and four of them are in the city of Schweinfurt. The Faculty of Applied Natural Sciences and Humanities is present at both study locations.

=== Faculties in Schweinfurt ===
- Applied Natural Sciences and Humanities
- Electrical Engineering
- Mechanical Engineering
- Business and Engineering

=== Faculties in Würzburg ===
- Applied Natural Sciences and Humanities
- Applied Social Sciences
- Architecture and Civil Engineering
- Visual Design
- Computer Science and Business Information Systems
- Plastics Engineering and Surveying
- Economics and Business Administration

== Profile ==
The University of Applied Sciences Würzburg-Schweinfurt is the third largest university of applied sciences in Bavaria with 8654 students (winter semester 2011/12), over 200 lecturers (WS 2011/12), 20 lecturers with special tasks and 298 other members of staff. Currently, the 10 faculties offer 30 courses finishing with a diploma, bachelor or master's degree.

The University of Applied Sciences Würzburg-Schweinfurt is a member of MedienCampus Bayern, the umbrella organization for media education in Bavaria.

== Research & Established Institutes of Research ==
The university has seven application-oriented research institutes, some of which are interdisciplinary, in which, in addition to non-graduate students, especially graduate students, an ideal opportunity to practice "research on the object":

=== Institute Of Applied Logistics (IAL) ===
For more than ten years, the Institute for Applied Logistics (IAL) at THWS has been involved in research in the broad field of logistics. The institute works with partners from industry, trade and logistics services.

==== Sponsors ====
- BVL - Confederation of Logistics (The logistics network for specialists and executives. Promotion of research and development projects in the field of logistics.)
- LRA - Logistics Research Austria (Cooperation Initiative of Austrian universities, colleges and non-university institutions for research and development in the fields of logistics, supply chain management and transport)
- Hans-Wilhelm Renkhoff Foundation (The Hans-Wilhelm Renkhoff Foundation was launched in 1995 by Hans-Wilhelm Renkhoff, founder of the group WAREMA. The foundation promotes both science, research and development as well as the practical and SME-related training of engineers and business economists at the FHWS.)
- Federal Ministry of Education and Research of Germany
- Association of the Logisticians

=== Institute for Digital Engineering (IDEE) ===
The IDEE is a cross-faculty institute of THWS. Five research professors are in charge of the IDEA around the Industry 4.0 topic. They are supported by research-oriented colleagues in the respective projects. The research professorships are characterized by the special research mandate, which goes hand in hand with a reduction in the workload of teaching. The IDEE is thematically divided into the following centers, whereby interdisciplinary cooperation in the sense of the required competencies in Industry 4.0 is always in the foreground.

==== Center for Artificial Intelligence and Robotics (CAIRO) ====
The objective of the Center for Artificial Intelligence and Robotics (CAIRO) is to research topics in artificial intelligence.

==== Center Robotics (CERI) ====
CERI is closely linked to its THWS sister center CAIRO. Both centers are working towards the integration of AI into Robotics.

Recently, CERI received 120 million euro funding from Bavarian Government for its new building in Schweinfurt.

==== Center Additive Metal Printing (CAMP) ====
The Center for Additive Metal Printing, or CAMP for short, deals with application-oriented research fields that are gaining in importance for both SMEs and large regional companies.

=== Institute of Design and Information Systems (IDIS) ===
The IDIS is an institution based at the Würzburg-Schweinfurt University of Applied Sciences, which deals with applied, interdisciplinary research and development in the field of digital information and communication media.

==== Notable Sponsors & Customers ====
- Audi
- DATEV
- iWelt
- O2
- Schaffler

=== Technology Transfer Center for E-Mobility ===
At the TTZ-EMO, more than 35 employees including students with six professors are currently researching and developing specific topics and issues relating to electrical energy technology, drive technology and electromobility. In addition to the Bad Neustadt location, they also use laboratories and institutes at the Schweinfurt location. The main topics are currently bundled in five scientific working groups: battery systems, power electronics, electrical machines, control engineering and electrical power engineering.

==== Notable Sponsors ====
- Fraunhofer ISC
- Winora Group
- JOPP

=== IEHT - Institute for Power Engineering and High Voltage Technology at the Competence Centre Mainfranken ===
The Institute for Power Engineering and High Voltage Technology (IEHT) was founded on 1 October 2011 at FHWS and forms part of the Competence Centre Mainfranken at the department in Schweinfurt. It serves as technological interface between the laboratories of the institute, the power engineering and high voltage technology laboratories of the faculties, the Technology Transfer Centre for E-mobility as well as external project partners.

=== IREM - Institute for Rescue, Emergency and Disaster Management ===
The Institute for Rescue, Emergency and Disaster Management was founded in the summer semester of 2014 and is affiliated with the IAL, the second research-based institution of the faculty with the aim of transferring interdisciplinary knowledge into usable projects and products To raise college. Of particular importance in IREM is the integration of structures and experiences of members of public authorities and organizations with security tasks (BOS).

== University Media Center (HMZ) ==
The Hochschulmedienzentrum (HMZ) is a service provider in matters of media in the context of audiovisual productions, university projects, lectures and theses available to students and lecturers of all faculties. Like the library and IT service center, the HMZ is a central institution of the university.

== Ranking ==
CHE University Ranking (Category: Subject)	Rank
Mechatronics	65
Mechanical Engineering	104

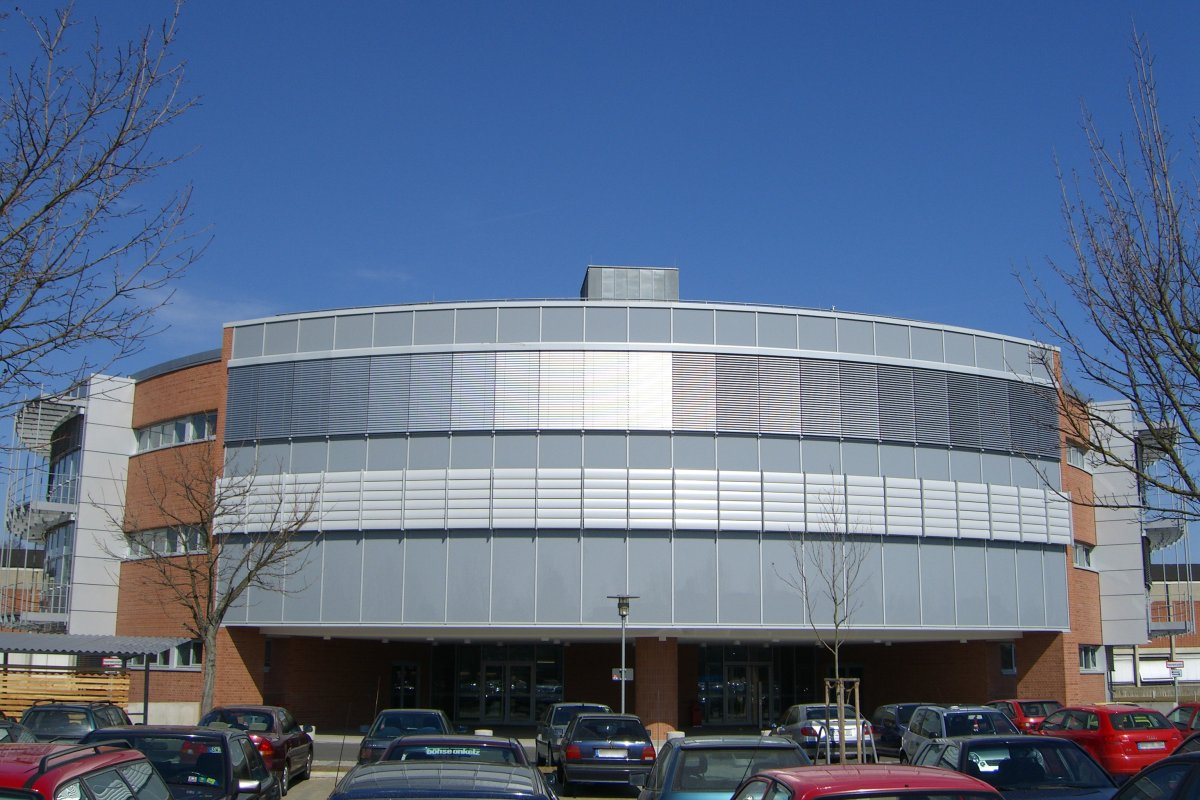
University building in Schweinfurt

== Library ==
The University Library holdings are specialized on the range of subjects taught at the university, from social sciences through economics to engineering. The library is located in four buildings in Würzburg and one in Schweinfurt. Services include inter-library loans, work stations, computers, printing and photocopying.

== Campus TV ==
Since 2007 the Bachelor students in Media Management have produced "Campus TV" in co-operation with TV Touring. As part of their course work, the students take responsibility for both content and technical aspects. The broadcasts focus on the life of the university and of the students. Broadcasts are every Tuesday at 18.30.

== Awards and membership ==
- MINTernational Best Strategy Award
- National Code of Conduct for German Universities regarding international students

== See also ==
- Fachhochschule

== Gallery ==
University logo prior to 31 December 2022

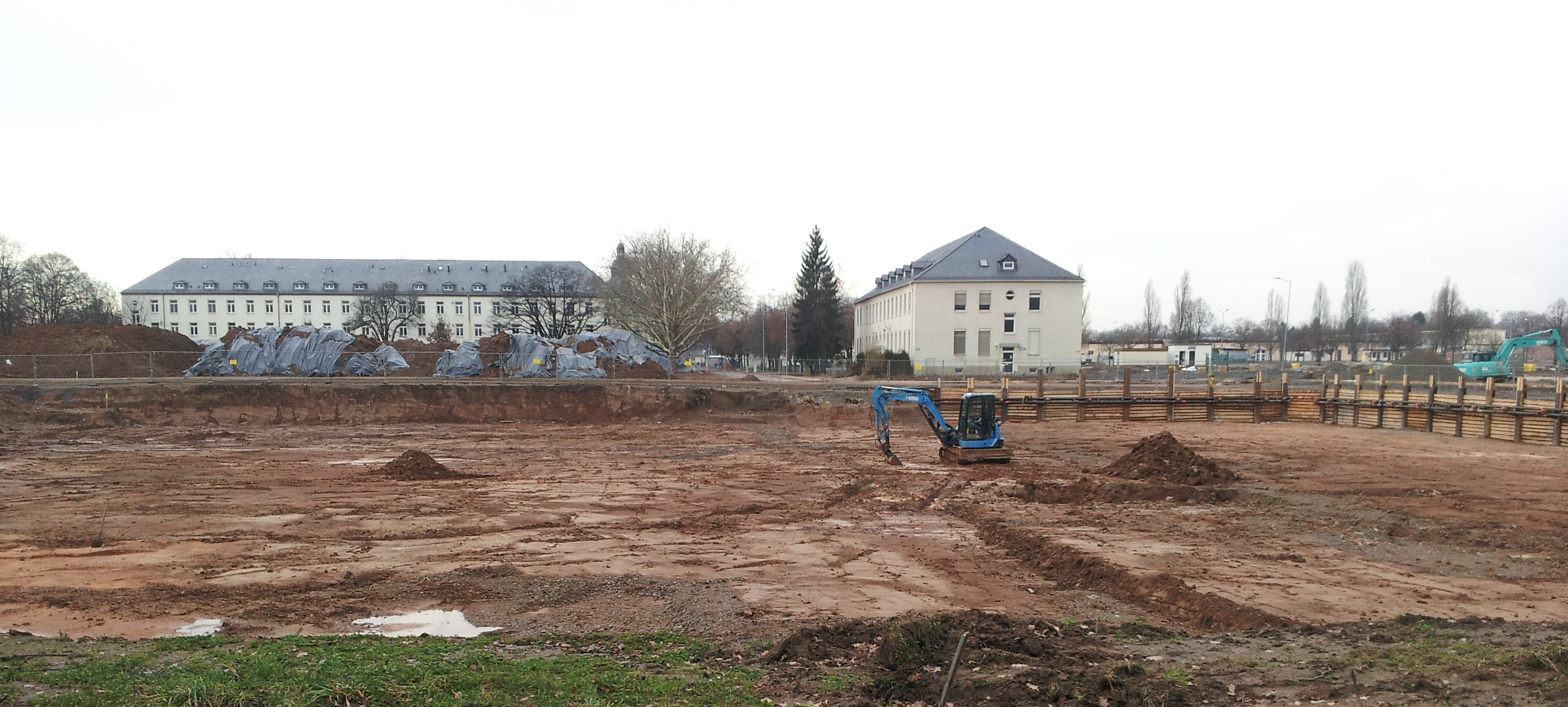
Building works at the new I-Campus in Schweinfurt, 2018
