= Instructions of the Year XIII =

Set of Uruguayan mandates brought upon the Assembly of the Year XIII

The Instructions of the Year XIII (Spanish: Instrucciones del año XIII) were the mandate brought by the representatives from the Oriental Province to the Assembly of the Year XIII of the United Provinces of the River Plate.

In 1813, a meeting called by the Second Triumvirate was meant to define the type of government for the new nation. The people of the Oriental Province (what is now Uruguay) drafted a federalist document, opposed to the centralism of the Second Triumvirate.

Among other ideas, the following principles were proclaimed:

- independence,
- republic,
- federalism,
- full civic and religious freedom,
- the capital should not be Buenos Aires.

These Instructions were the origin of an unending conflict between the Oriental leader, José Gervasio Artigas, and the authorities that be in Buenos Aires.

Some scholars see the influence of American founding father Thomas Paine in these Instructions.

== See also ==
- Assembly of the Year XIII
- Oriental Province
- Liga Federal
- Artiguism
