= Popular Unity (Uruguay) =

Popular Unity Unidad Popular
- Abbreviation: UP
- Founded: 21 April 2013
- Headquarters: Montevideo
- Ideology: Socialism; Anti-capitalism; Anti-imperialism
- Political position: Left-wing to far-left
- Chamber of Representatives: 0 / 99
- Senate: 0 / 30
- Intendants: 0 / 19
- Departmental Board: 0 / 112

Party flag

Website
- www.unidadpopular.org.uy

Popular Unity (Spanish: Unidad Popular) is a Uruguayan electoral alliance of political parties.

Previously known as Popular Assembly, they were born out of dissatisfaction with the Broad Front since it became the party in charge of the government, accusing it of being "not leftist enough". In 2013 they changed to the current name. They took part in the 2014 Uruguayan general election, when they got their first representative at the Chamber of Deputies, who has been a vocal critic of the centre-left government.

Their candidate to the 2019 Uruguayan general election was once again Gonzalo Abella, with an anti-oligarchy and anti-imperialist platform.

In 2023 they reached an agreement with the Workers' Party and the Struggling Workers' Front, forming an electoral agreement called the Popular Unity–Workers' Front. The candidate for that front in 2024 was Gonzalo Martínez from the Popular Unity, with Andrea Revuelta from the Workers' Party as the running mate.

== Composition ==
- Avanzar Movement
- Bolshevik Party of Uruguay
- Communist Refoundation
- Humanist Party of Uruguay
- March 26 Movement
- National Group ProUNIR
- Popular Assembly
- Retirement Defense Movement
- Revolutionary Communist Party of Uruguay
- Socialist Compromise
- Socialist Intransigence
- Workers' and Peasants' Party of Uruguay

== Electoral history ==
=== Presidential elections ===
Election	Party candidate	Running mate	Votes	%	Votes	%	Result
Election	Party candidate	Running mate	First Round		Second Round		Result
2014	Gonzalo Abella	Gustavo López	26,869	1.13%	–		Lost ✗
2019	Gonzalo Abella	Gustavo López	19,728	0.84%	–		Lost ✗
2024 (as part of UP-FT)	Gonzalo Martínez	Andrea Revuelta	10,102	0.41%	-		Lost ✗

=== Chamber of Deputies and Senate elections ===
Election	Votes	%	Chamber seats	+/-	Position	Senate seats	+/-	Position	Size
2014	26,869	1.13%	1 / 99	▲1	5th	0 / 30	Steady	Opposition	5th
2019	19,728	0.84%	0 / 99	▼1	8th	0 / 30	Steady	Extra-parliamentary	8th
2024 (as part of UP-FT)	10,102	0.41%	0 / 99	Steady	8th	0 / 30	Steady	Extra-parliamentary	8th

== See also ==
- Anti-imperialist Unitary Commissions
- Broad Front
