= Jeffrey Wilson =

Jeffrey Wilson may refer to:

- Jeffrey A. Wilson, professor of geological sciences
- Jeffrey T. Wilson, chief executive officer of Imperial Petroleum

== See also ==
- Jeff Wilson (disambiguation)
- Geoff Wilson (disambiguation)
