= March 26 Movement =

March 26 Movement Movimiento 26 de Marzo
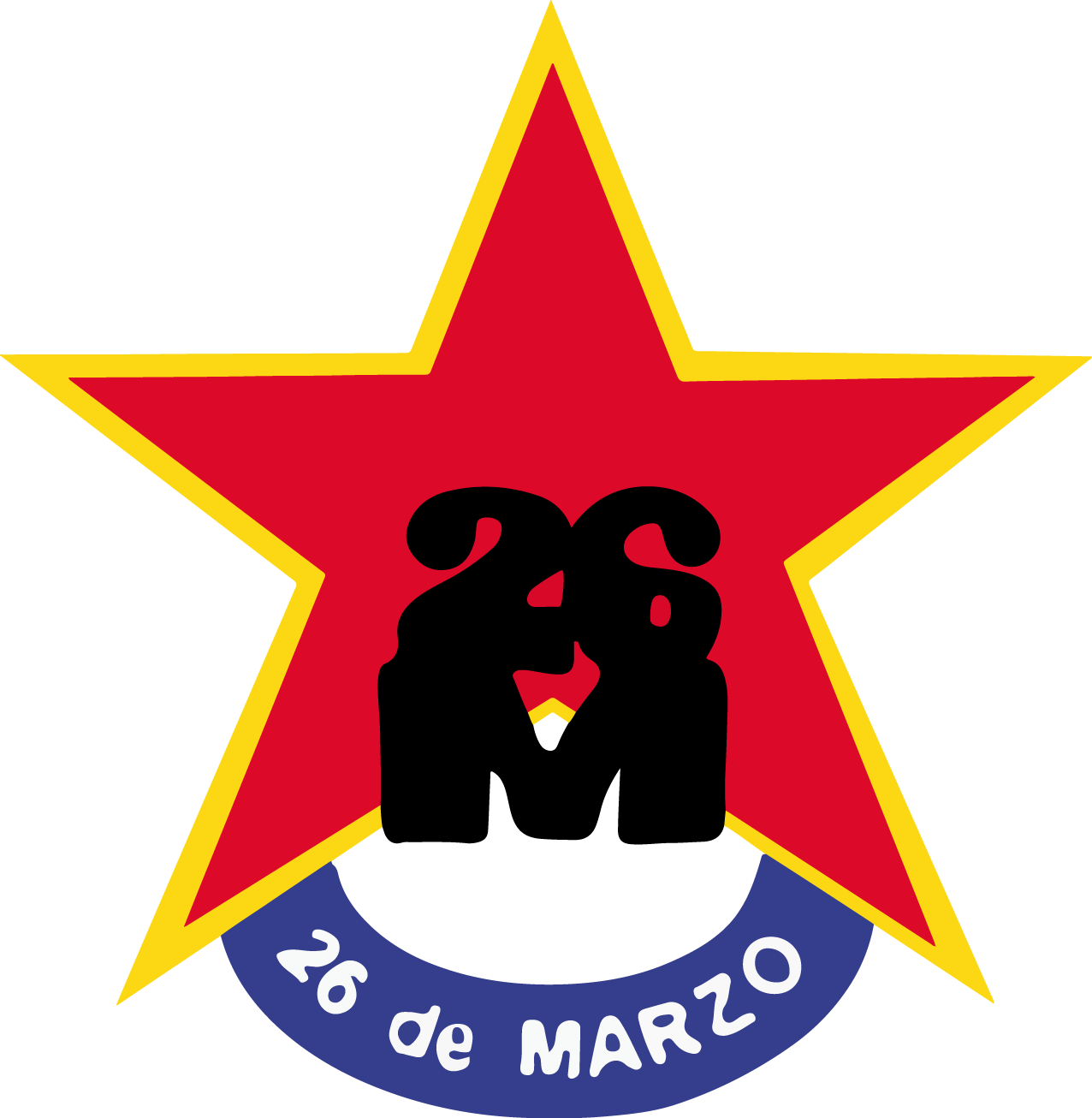
- Leader: Eduardo Rubio
- Founded: 1971
- Split from: Tupamaros
- Newspaper: Liberación
- Youth wing: Youth of March 26 Movement
- Ideology: Communism; Marxism–Leninism; Artiguism; Anti-imperialism
- Political position: Far-left
- National affiliation: Popular Unity
- Regional affiliation: São Paulo Forum
- Chamber of Deputies: 0 / 99

Website
- m26demarzo.wordpress.com

The March 26 Movement (Movimiento 26 de Marzo – M26) is a Marxist–Leninist communist party in Uruguay, which emerged out the Tupamaros – National Liberation Movement. Since its foundation in 1971 until March 2008 was a member organisation of the BroadFront. After that the M26 founded a new party called "Asamblea Popular" (People's Assembly) in cooperation with other leftwing groups; nowadays that coalition is known as Popular Unity.

== See also ==
- Popular Unity
