= Popular Assembly =

Political party in Uruguay

Popular Assembly Asamblea Popular
- Founded: 21 April 2006
- Headquarters: Montevideo
- Ideology: Socialism; Communism; Marxism–Leninism; Anti-imperialism
- Political position: Left-wing to far-left
- National affiliation: Popular Unity
- Chamber of Deputies: 0 / 99

The Popular Assembly (Spanish: Asamblea Popular) is a political party in Uruguay.

== History ==
The party was founded in April 2006, as a further left alternative to the Broad Front. It is supported by the Revolutionary Communist Party of Uruguay, the Humanist Party of Uruguay and other left-wing groups, including several former local organisation of the Broad Left. In 2008, it gained the support of the March 26 Movement.

The party's best known members include former Senator Helios Sarthou, and political activist Raúl Rodríguez. The group stood Rodriguez in the 2009 presidential election. He took 0.67% of the vote, while the party took 0.66% in the parliamentary elections and did not win any seats.

== 2014 elections ==
Popular Assembly took part in the 2014 Uruguayan general elections under the denomination Popular Unity. The party won their first seat in the House of Deputies.
