= Jupe =

Jupe may refer to:

== Arts and entertainment ==
- Le Jupe, a character in the 1718 comedy play The Coquet
- Sissy Jupe, a character in Dickens's Hard Times

== People ==
- Jacobi Jupe (born 2013), British child actor
- Noah Jupe (born 2005), English actor
- Walter Jupé (1916–1985), German actor and screenwriter
- Jupe Karhu, member of the Finnish metal band Rifftera
- Julia Perez (1980–2017), known as Jupe, Indonesian actress, singer and businesswoman

== Other uses ==
- Jupe (clothing), a loose-fitting wool jacket or tunic for men, and later an item of women's and children's clothing
- Jupe (IRC), a term used in Internet Relay Chat networks
- Jupe, a flat-packed housing business of Jeff Wilson
- Jupes, a division of the Comanche tribe

== See also ==
- Alain Juppé (born 1945), French politician, Prime Minister of France from 1995 to 1997
