= Geoff Wilson =

Geoffrey or Geoff Wilson may refer to:

- Geoff Wilson (Canadian politician) (born 1941), former member of the Canadian House of Commons
- Geoff Wilson (Australian politician) (born 1952), member of the Queensland Parliament
- Geoff Wilson (Australian footballer) (1940–2022), Australian rules footballer
- Geoff Wilson (professor) (1938–2020), Australian nuclear physicist
- Geoffrey Plumpton Wilson (1878–1934), English amateur footballer
- Geoffrey Wilson (cricketer) (1895–1960), English cricketer
- Geoffrey Wilson (British politician) (1903–1975), British Conservative politician

== See also ==
- Jeff Wilson (disambiguation)
- Jeffrey Wilson (disambiguation)
