= Helios Sarthou =

Uruguayan politician and lawyer

Helios Sarthou (6 or 7 May 1926 – 2 June 2012) was an Uruguayan politician and lawyer. He was one of the founding members of the Broad Front and the Popular Assembly.

A lawyer by profession, he specialized in defending workers in labor disputes.

He entered politics in 1961 by helping to found the Popular Union, a movement that brought together socialists, independents, and members of the National Party. He was also one of the founders of the Broad Front coalition in 1971 and the Movement of Popular Participation (MPP) in 1989.

He was elected deputy in 1989 and senator in 1994 for the MPP. However, his disagreements within the Broad Front led him to leave the political group, proposing a left-wing alternative.

He was a law professor at the University of the Republic, Uruguay.
