= Jopp Group =

German multinational manufacturing company

- Type: GmbH
- Founded: 6 February 1919
- Headquarters: Bad Neustadt an der Saale, Germany
- Key people: Hubert P. Büchs; Martin Büchs; Klaus Gockler
- Products: Gearshift systems for vehicles incl. knobs, gearshift covers and sensor technology, precision-machined parts and powder metal parts
- Number of employees: > 1,900 (2016)
- Website: jopp.com

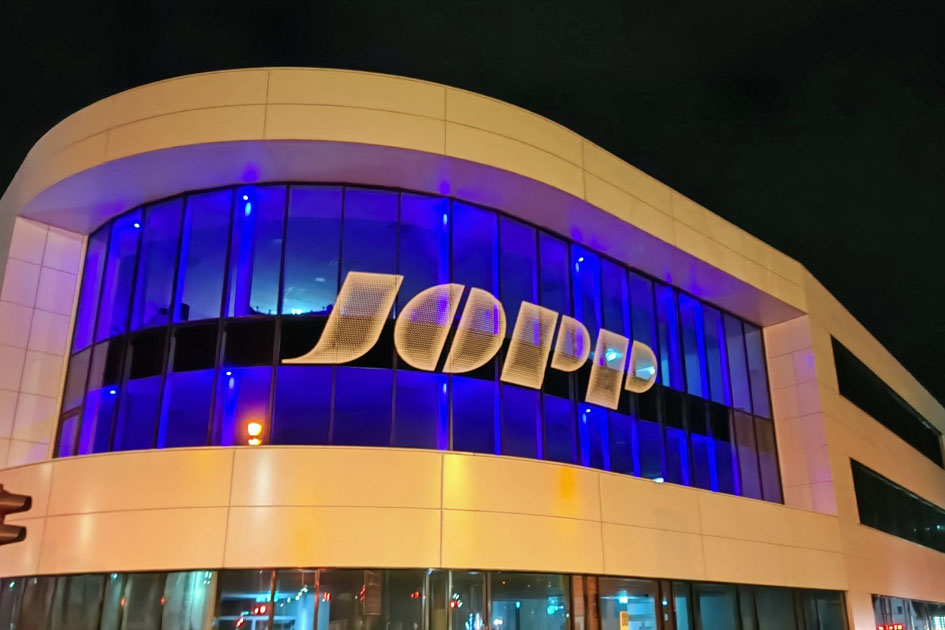
JOPP Campus in Bad Neustadt, Germany

The Jopp Group is an international supplier of automotive and industrial components.

Founded in 1919, Jopp is headquartered in Bad Neustadt an der Saale, Germany Jopp employs over 1,900 people in Germany, the Czech Republic, Hungary, Mexico, the US and China.

== Products ==
Jopp manufactures gearshift systems for manual transmissions (MT), automated (AMT) and automatic transmissions (AT) as well as corresponding plastics and electronics components, gearshift knobs and gearshift covers made of TPU and leather.

Jopp also produces mechanical components like precision-machined and powder metal parts. The company provides consulting services for industrial assembly, automatization, and production. Jopp also produces plastics, electronics systems and components. and machines and equipment in automation engineering.

== History ==
On 6 February 1919, Theodor Valentin Jopp, a manufacturer from Zella-Mehlis in Thuringia, bought a monastery mill "house with attached turbine facility with generators" in Bad Neustadt. He founded a company there and named it Jopp.

In the beginning, Jopp Group produced bicycle parts By 1920, Jopp was manufacturing sowing machines, harrows, ploughs, food cutting machines and bicycles. In the 1920s, Jopp started making screws and turned parts. After World War II, Jopp operated for a period under foreign management. After the Second World War, the company was temporarily foreign-managed. In the 1950s, Jopp started producing components for the automotive industry and its suppliers.

At the beginning of the 1960s, Jopp built a new plant in Herschfeld. This was also the start of powder metal technology. On 16 October 1991, Jopp was taken over by new share holders: Dr. Hubert P. Büchs, a senior staff at FAG Kugelfischer and three Jopp executives. After their retirement, further family members of Dr. Büchs acquired shares of the company.

=== Company growth ===
In 2000, Jopp acquired a second plant in Bad Neustadt. In 2001, Jopp purchased what is today Jopp Plastics Technology GmbH in Euskirchen, North Rhine-Westphalia. Gearshift components are manufactured here from high-strength engineering plastics.

In 2002, Jopp acquired what is today Jopp Electronics GmbH in Rottweil, Baden-Württemberg. Since then, JOPP has been developing and manufacturing gear recognition systems with corresponding sensors.

=== New company foundations ===
On 28 January 2003, Jopp founded Jopp Automotive s.r.o. in Velké Meziříčí, Czech Republic to supply components to a Bosch facility in that country. Apart from mechanical components, the facility produces manual shifters for the automotive industry. Around 200–500 employees work for Jopp Automotive s.r.o. in a production area of around 6,000 m^{2} in 2022.

In 2006, Jopp opened a sales office in Suzhou Industrial Park in Suzhou, China. In 2008 a production company was created there. At first, sophisticated mechanical components were manufactured for German production. In the meantime, automotive customers have been supplied locally.

In 2010, Jopp acquired 60% of the company shares of IFSYS GmbH in the course of a capital increase. IFSYS is manufacturer of feeding and automatization technology. In 2011, Jopp took over what is today the Jopp Interior Group in Reichenschwand, Hungary and Mexico. In 2015, Jopp assumed control of Verbund Elektroniksysteme St. Georgen GmbH..

In 2016, Jopp established a joint venture with the Indian supplier Remsons Industries Ltd. in which both companies have a share of 50%. In addition, the Rattelsdorf-based ELKCOM GmbH was taken over in 2016, now operating under the name of EMSO Electrical Mechanical Solutions GmbH.

== Products ==
=== Business sectors ===
- Gearshift Systems: shifter systems for all common transmission types
- Lubrication & Engine Cooling Systems: oil- and water-distribution systems for engines and transmissions
- Machining Technology: high precision machined metal parts
- Powder Metal Technology: high precision powder metal components
- Electronics: PCB design and assembly services
- Automation Solutions: feeding technology and custom-built machinery manufacture

=== External gearshift systems ===
Jopp produces external gearshift systems for various vehicle transmissions and vehicle interior: gearshift systems for the centre console which are either installed on the vehicle floor or below the vehicle floor and shifters, which are mounted at the bulkhead of the vehicle. The necessary gear recognition sensor system is also developed and built by Jopp.

=== Shift shaft modules ===
Shift shaft modules, which comprise - beside the shift shaft - numerous functional elements for ergonomical and secure shifting of gears in the transmission, including start-stop sensor system.

=== Oil-bearing systems ===
Produced by Jopp Plastics Technology. There exist high requirements regarding material and processing.

=== Clutch actuator technology ===
Components made of aluminum, plastics and rubber enable the hydraulic operation of double clutches and their jerk-free shifting.

=== Knobs and covers ===
Knobs and covers for external gearshift systems are developed in Germany and manufactured in Mexico and Hungary. Materials such as polyurethane, leather and plastics are used.

=== Mechanical components ===
Components are manufactured pre-finished on turning machines and machining centres.

== Research ==
Jopp supports the Formula Student Teams of the University of Applied Sciences Würzburg-Schweinfurt and the University Bayreuth and engages in the endowed chair electromobility in the technology transfer centre Bad Neustadt and allocates essential resources for the project "bidirectional loading of electric vehicles in company smart grid".

== Locations ==
- Jopp Automotive GmbH, Bad Neustadt an der Saale, Germany
- Jopp Plastics Technology GmbH, North Rhine-Westphalia, Germany
- Jopp Electronics GmbH, Baden-Wuerttemberg, Germany
- IFSYS Integrated Feeding Systems GmbH Großbardorf, Germany
- Jopp Automotive s.r.o., Meziříčí, Czech Republic
- Jopp Technology (Suzhou) Co., Ltd., Suzhou, Jiangsu Province, P. R. China
- Jopp Automotive de México S.A. de C.V., Carr., Tlaxco Tlaxcala, Mexico
- Jopp Interior Hungary Kft., Szolnok, Hungary
- Jopp Remsons Industries Private Ltd., Mumbai, India
- EMSO Electrical Mechanical Solutions GmbH, Rattelsdorf, Germany

== Literature/Itemization ==
- Büchs H. P.: Getriebe-Außenschaltungen, VDI-Berichte Nr. 1393, 1998
- Büchs H. P., Neunzig T., Versmold H.: Shift by Wire Schaltung, Vereinfachtes Schaltungskonzept mit elektronischer Realisierung von Sicherheitsfunktionen. VDI-Berichte Nr.1610, 2001
- Büchs H. P.: Die äußere Schaltung, Verlag moderne Industrie, 2004
- Büchs H. P.: Gear Recognition for Manual Transmissions with start-stop-control. 9th International CTI Symposium, 29.11. – 2 December 2010, Berlin, Volume 2
- Bayern Innovativ: http://www.bayern-innovativ.de/6a88af90-a4af-ae40-7145-6a84ecb87394?PP=4a17644b-ee26-c89e-0f51-ac754f52e2f1
- Branchenbuch: http://branchenbuch.meinestadt.de/bad-neustadt-saale/company/2776302
- Stadt Bad Neustadt: http://www.badneustadt.rhoen-saale.net/Wirtschaft/Elektromobilitaet/Foerderverein
- Mainpost: http://www.mainpost.de/regional/rhoengrabfeld/Neuorganisierte-Jopp-Gruppe-strebt-weiter-nach-Wachstum;art765,7708866
- Mainfranken-Racing Team: http://www.mainfranken-racing.de/cms/index.php/component/content/article/1-news/30-neuer-sponsor-jopp-gmbh-aus-bad-neustadt.html
- M-E-NES: https://web.archive.org/web/20140727005130/http://www.m-e-nes.de/de/news/aktuell/energiewende-auf-vier-raedern-ttz-entwickelt-ein-effizientes-lade-entladegeraet-fuer-elektroautos-kopie-1.html
