= Revolutionary Communist Party of Uruguay =

- Secretary-General: Ricardo Cohen
- Founded: 1972
- Ideology: Communism; Marxism–Leninism–Maoism
- Political position: Far-left
- National affiliation: Popular Unity
- International affiliation: ICMLPO (defunct); ICOR

Party flag

The Revolutionary Communist Party (Spanish: Partido Comunista Revolucionario) is a Marxist–Leninist–Maoist political party from Uruguay.

Established in 1972, nowadays it is part of the leftist Popular Unity.

It takes part in the International Conference of Marxist–Leninist Parties and Organizations (International Newsletter).

Its secretary general is Ricardo Cohen.

== See also ==
- Communist Party of Ecuador – Red Sun
