= JOP =

JOP may refer to:

- Java Optimized Processor, an implementation of a Java Virtual Machine
- Jon Oliva's Pain, an American heavy metal band
- Jop van der Linden (born 1990), Dutch footballer
- The Journal of Politics, a peer-reviewed journal published by University of Chicago Press.
- JOP: Journal of the Pancreas, a journal published by the predatory OMICS Publishing Group
- JOP, a nickname of J. O. Prestwich, a British historian
- Jeux Olympiques et Paralympiques, official designation of the Olympic Games and the Paralympic Games in France:
  - Jeux Olympiques et Paralympiques de 2024, branded as Paris 2024, the 2024 Summer Olympics and 2024 Summer Paralympics in Paris
  - Jeux Olympiques et Paralympiques de 2030, branded as French Alps 2030, the 2030 Winter Olympics and 2030 Winter Paralympics in the French Alps
- Jeux Olympiques de Paris, unofficial name of the 2024 Olympic Games
- Jesús Ortiz-Paz, nicknamed JOP, musician of the American regional Mexican band Fuerza Regida
- Mariusz Jop (born 1978), a Polish professional football manager and former player

== See also ==
- Jopp, a surname
