= Archie McLean (ice hockey) =

Canadian ice hockey player

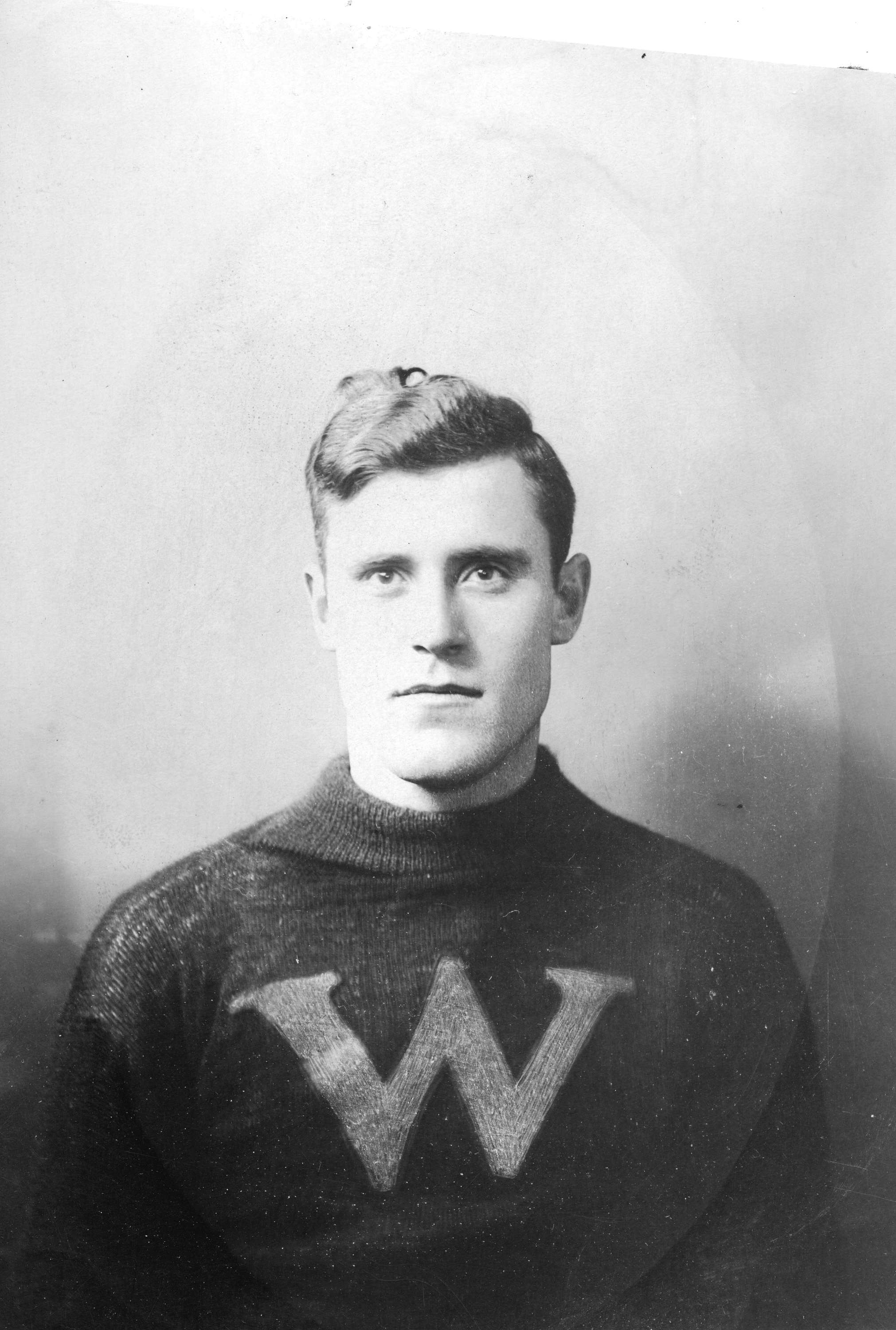
- Archie McLean in 1912 with the New Westminster Royals
- Born: March 10, 1889 Bracebridge, Ontario, Canada
- Died: August 21, 1960 (aged 71) Vancouver, British Columbia, Canada
- Height: 6 ft 0 in (183 cm)
- Position: Defense
- Played for: Winnipeg Hockey Club; Winnipeg Monarchs; New Westminster Royals; Toronto Blueshirts
- Playing career: c.1910–c.1913

Archibald "Sue, Soo" McLean (March 10, 1889 – August 21, 1960) was a Canadian professional ice hockey player. McLean played in the 1910s in the early years of professional hockey. He played defence with the Winnipeg Monarchs, New Westminster Royals and Toronto Blueshirts. He was released by the Blueshirts on December 5, 1913.

== Statistics ==
			Regular season					Playoffs
Season	Team	League	GP	G	A	Pts	PIM	GP	G	A	Pts	PIM
1912	New Westminster Royals	PCHA	15	2	0	2	36	—	—	—	—	—
1912–13	Toronto Blueshirts	NHA	9	2	0	2	4	—	—	—	—	—
			–	–	–	–	–	—	—	—	—	—
