= Meziříčí =

- Municipality
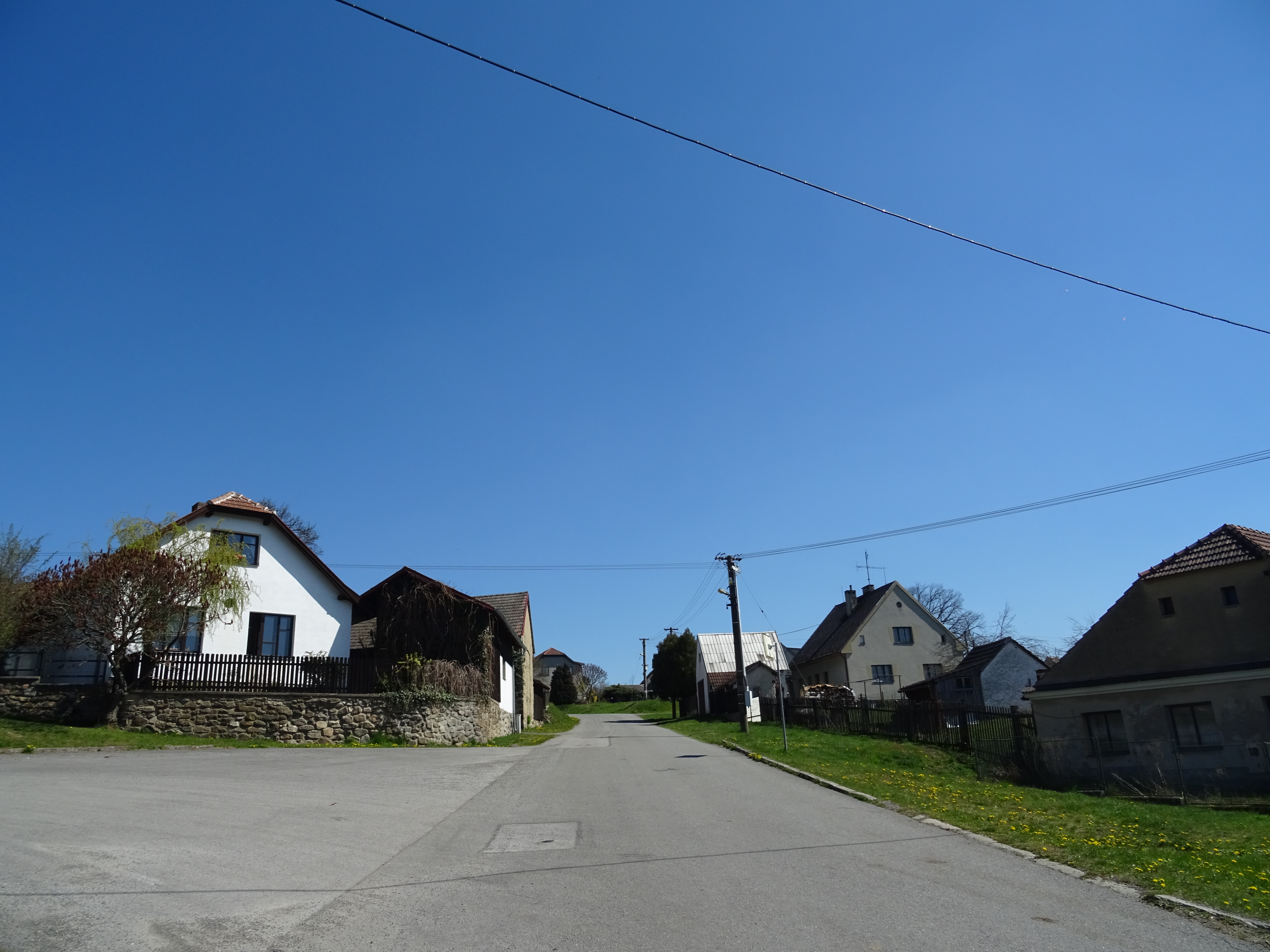
- Centre of Meziříčí

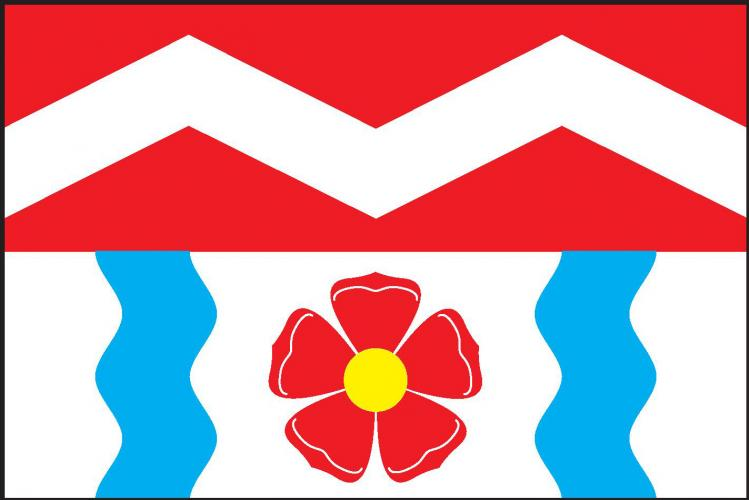
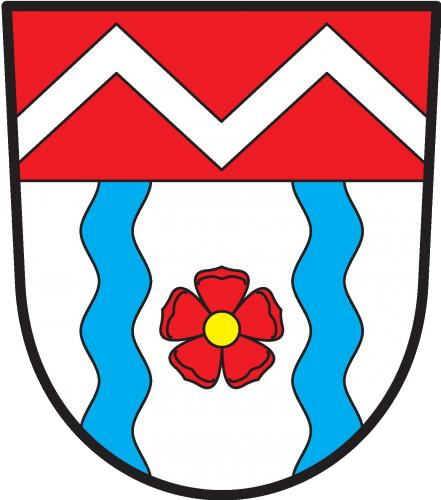
- Flag Coat of arms

- Location in the Czech Republic
- Coordinates: 49°26′12″N 14°34′30″E
- Country: Czech Republic
- Region: South Bohemian
- District: Tábor
- First mentioned: 1379

Area
  - Total: 5.75 km^{2} (2.22 sq mi)
- Elevation: 456 m (1,496 ft)

Population (2026-01-01)
  - Total: 181
  - Density: 31.5/km^{2} (81.5/sq mi)
- Time zone: UTC+1 (CET)
  - Summer (DST): UTC+2 (CEST)
- Postal code: 391 31
- Website: www.obecmezirici.cz

Meziříčí is a municipality and village in Tábor District in the South Bohemian Region of the Czech Republic. It has about 200 inhabitants.

Meziříčí lies approximately 7 kilometres (4 mi) west of Tábor, 52 km (32 mi) north of České Budějovice, and 74 km (46 mi) south of Prague.

== Demographics ==
Historical population
Year	Pop.	±%
1869	385	—
1880	463	+20.3%
1890	402	−13.2%
1900	382	−5.0%
1910	390	+2.1%
1921	373	−4.4%
1930	325	−12.9%
1950	239	−26.5%
1961	222	−7.1%
1970	212	−4.5%
1980	186	−12.3%
1991	137	−26.3%
2001	132	−3.6%
2011	177	+34.1%
2021	171	−3.4%
Source: Censuses
