= Jupp (surname) =

Jupp is a surname, originating in the English county of Sussex and may refer to:

In music

- Ryan Jupp (born 1995), British West End Performer
- Eric Jupp (1922–2003), British musician
- Mickey Jupp (born 1944), English musician
- Richard Jupp (musician) (21st century), British drummer

In sport

- Duncan Jupp (born 1975), Scottish footballer
- Gabrielle Jupp (born 1997), British gymnast
- George Jupp (cricketer, born 1845) (1845–1930), English cricketer
- George Jupp (cricketer, born 1875) (1875–1938), English cricketer
- Harry Jupp (1841–1889), English cricketer
- Vallance Jupp (1891–1960), English cricketer

Other

- Alex Jupp (1927–2018), Canadian politician
- James Jupp (1932–2022), British-Australian political scientist
- Miles Jupp (born 1979), British actor
- Richard Jupp (1728–1799), English architect
- Roger Jupp (born 1956), English bishop
- Simon Jupp (born 1985), British politician
