= Schäffler =

Schäffler is a surname. Notable people with the surname include:

- Alfredo Schäffler (born 1941), Austrian priest and theologian;
- Frank Schäffler (born 1968), German politician;
- Manuel Schäffler (born 1989), German footballer.
