= Jeff Wilson (footballer) =

English footballer

Personal information
- Full name: Jeffrey Hansel Wilson
- Date of birth: 7 December 1964
- Place of birth: South Shields, England
- Position: Defender

Youth career
- Darlington

Senior career*
| Years | Team | Apps | (Gls) |
| 1982–1984 | Darlington | 11 | (0) |
- Ryhope CA
- * Club domestic league appearances and goals

Jeffrey Hansel Wilson (born 7 December 1964) is an English former footballer who played as a defender in the Football League for Darlington and in non-league football for Ryhope CA.
