= Oriental Revolutionary Movement =

Communist party in Uruguay

Oriental Revolutionary Movement Movimiento Revolucionario Oriental
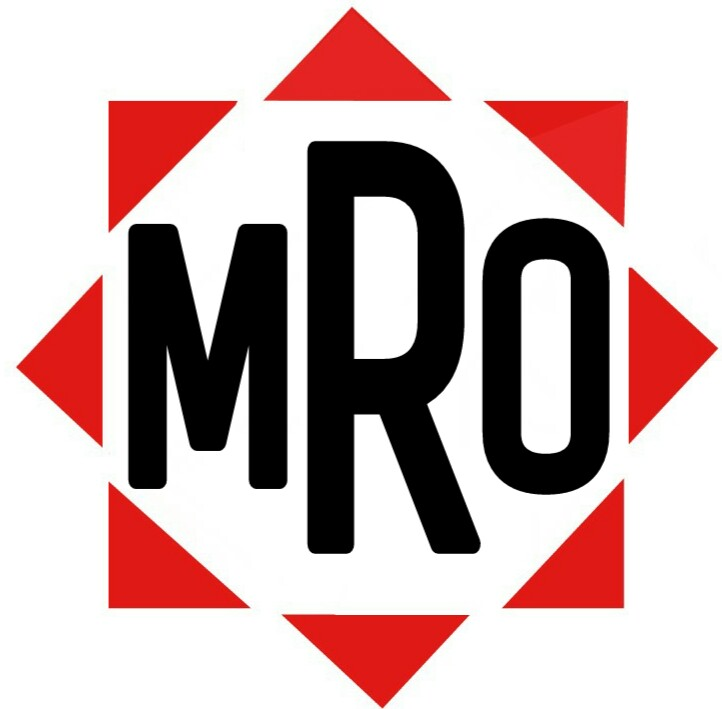
- General Secretary: Mario Rossi Garretano
- Founded: April 21, 1961
- Headquarters: Daniel Fernández Crespo 2178 bis, Montevideo, Uruguay
- Newspaper: Los Orientales
- Youth wing: Guevarist Youth
- Armed wing: FARO (1967–1985)
- Ideology: Communism; Marxism–Leninism; Guevarism; Foco theory; Left-wing nationalism; Revolutionary socialism
- Political position: Far-left
- National affiliation: COMUNA
- International affiliation: International Guevarist Coordinator

Website
- www.mro.nuevaradio.org

Oriental Revolutionary Movement (Spanish: Movimiento Revolucionario Oriental, MRO) is a far-left Marxist–Leninist communist party in Uruguay.

From 1967 to 1985, it had an armed wing, the Oriental Revolutionary Armed Forces (Fuerzas Armadas Revolucionarias Orientales). Politically, being one of the founders of Frente Amplio, it left the alliance in 1993 and is now part of the far-left Comisiones Unitarias Antiimperialistas (COMUNA).

== History ==
MRO was founded by Ariel Collazo on April 21, 1961, following a split from the Partido Blanco. He traveled to Cuba and became a Marxist–Leninist under the influence of Che Guevara and the Cuban Revolution. The establishment of the MRO involved a large number of members of the Communist Party of Uruguay who left the party and former executives, fiercely criticizing the anti-Stalinist and revisionist lines of the Communist Party of Uruguay.

In 1971, MRO was one of the founding organizations of Frente Amplio. It left Frente Amplio in 1993.

Since 2008, it has been part of the electoral alliance Comisiones Unitarias Antiimperialistas (COMUNA) which however failed at the admission for the 2009 election and didn't run in 2014. Current General Secretary is Mario Rossi Garretano.

== Structure ==
MRO has a youth wing, the "Guevarist Youth" (Juventud Guevarista) and a mass front, the "Revolutionary Front for a Socialist Alternative" (Frente Revolucionario por una Alternativa Socialista). MRO publishes Los Orientales.

== See also ==
- Tupamaros – National Liberation Movement
- Revolutionary Left Movement
- Revolutionary Movement Tupamaro
- Revolutionary Armed Forces of Colombia
- National Liberation Army
- Paraguayan People's Army
