= George Jupp (cricketer, born 1845) =

English cricketer

Personal information
- Full name: George Harman Jupp
- Born: 26 February 1845; Brentford, Middlesex, England
- Died: 24 February 1930 (aged 84); West Ealing, Middlesex, England
- Batting: Right-handed
- Bowling: Roundarm slow

Domestic team information
- Years: Team
- 1867: Gentlemen of the South
- 1867–1868: Middlesex

Career statistics
| Competition | FC |
|---|---|
| Matches | 8 |
| Runs scored | 181 |
| Batting average | 12.92 |
| 100s/50s | –/– |
| Top score | 49 |
| Balls bowled | 72 |
| Wickets | 2 |
| Bowling average | 24.50 |
| 5 wickets in innings | – |
| 10 wickets in match | – |
| Best bowling | 2/49 |
| Catches/stumpings | 1/– |
- Source: Cricinfo, 27 November 2010

George Harman Jupp (26 February 1845 – 24 February 1930) was an English cricketer. Jupp was a right-handed batsman who bowled roundarm slow, although with which hand he bowled with is unknown. He was born at Brentford, Middlesex.

Jupp made his first-class debut for Middlesex in 1864 against Surrey at the Cattle Market Ground in Islington. From 1867 to 1868, he represented Middlesex in 7 first-class matches, the last of which came against Surrey. Jupp also played a single first-class match for the Gentlemen of the South against the Players of the South in 1867. In his 8 first-class matches, he scored 181 runs at a batting average of 12.92, with a high score of 49. With the ball he took 2 wickets at a bowling average of 24.50, with best figures of 2/49.

Jupp died at West Ealing, Middlesex on 24 February 1930.
