= Victor Jopp =

Canadian ice hockey player (1887–1965)

- Born: June 25, 1887 Moosomin, Northwest Territories, Canada
- Died: June 25, 1965 (aged 78) Victoria, British Columbia, Canada
- Position: Forward
- Played for: Toronto Blueshirts; Sydney Millionaires; Halifax Crescents
- Playing career: 1906–1914

Victor Wilfrid Jopp (June 25, 1887 – June 25, 1965) was a Canadian professional ice hockey player. He played with the Toronto Blueshirts of the National Hockey Association, appearing in one game for the Blueshirts in the 1912–13 season. That same season included stints with the Halifax Crescents and Sydney Millionaires. He played in Halifax once again in 1913–14. He previously played in the Saskatchewan Senior Hockey League with Moosomin, his hometown from around 1906 to 1910.
