= Vanguards of the Fatherland =

Uruguayan far-right paramilitary organization

The Vanguards of the Fatherland (Spanish: Vanguardias de la Patria) were a group of far-right pseudo-fascist organizations in the Uruguayan Army, ideologically close to the riverist trend.

The movement was born in the context of the militarist opposition to the reformist policies promoted by the Uruguayan welfare state, soon before the 1933 Uruguayan coup d'état. Anti-egalitarian and explicitly opposed to batllism and communism, the movement offered military training for young civilians.

The Vanguards were directly linked to the previous Uruguayan Patriotic Association (Spanish: Asociación Patriótica del Uruguay) and were founded in 1929 under the sponsorship of riverists general Manuel Dubra and colonel Ulises Monegal. The movement used official Army facilities for their activities.

Aside from their training, vanguardists would organize military-styled parades and march using combat uniforms and weapons. The movement numbered nearly 400 members, despite Dubra stated his expectations were to reach 20,000 combatants by 1930.

At the moment of the foundation of the Vanguards, Dubra was serving as minister of War and Navy for the riverist government of Juan Campisteguy. His involvement in the development of a paramilitary organization led to a parliamentary investigation and interpellation, in which he was supported by riverist leader Pedro Manini Ríos.

The name of the Vanguards had been used by previous Uruguayan scouting organizations, despite there was no relationship between both movements.

== See also ==
- Fascism in Uruguay
