= George Jupp (cricketer, born 1875) =

English cricketer

George William Jupp (30 October 1875 – 6 July 1938) was an English cricketer who played in first-class cricket matches for Somerset between 1901 and 1907 and for Scotland from 1905 to 1912. He was born at Clevedon, Somerset and died at Longniddry, East Lothian, Scotland.

Educated at Uppingham School, Jupp played most of his cricket in Scotland where he was a civil servant in the Office of Works. He was a right-handed lower order batsman and a bowler of unknown type; in five games for his native Somerset, his highest score was just 23 and he bowled only three overs, conceding a single run but taking no wickets. His record in Scottish minor cricket was much more substantial, however, and at his death in 1938 he was termed "a dominating personality in Scottish cricket" and "for many years an automatic choice in representative matches". First-class matches played by Scotland were very limited in Jupp's heyday, but against the 1912 Australian side he scored 27 and 56, his two highest first-class scores, in what would prove to be his final first-class game.
