= Jeff Wilson (professor) =

American scientist

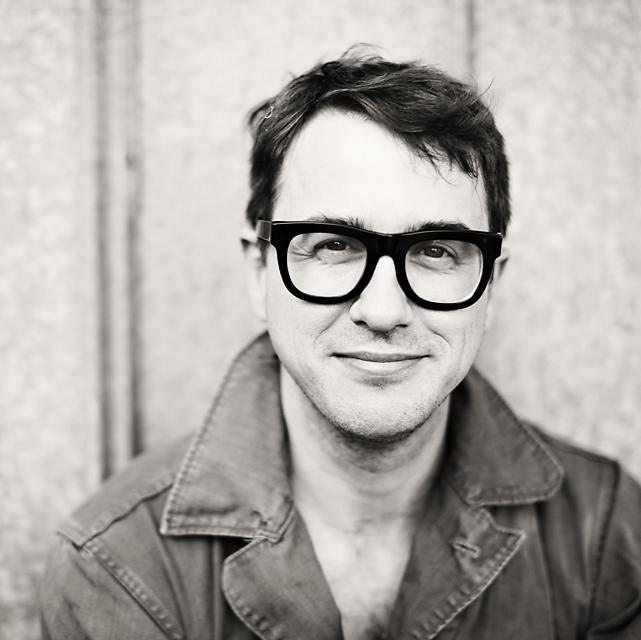
- Other name: Professor Dumpster
- Education: University of Canterbury (NZ)
- Known for: Environmental Health, Sustainability Education, Dumpster Diving
- Awards: Regents' Outstanding Teaching Award
- Scientific career
- Fields: Environmental Science
- Workplaces: Harvard, IBM, Ernst & Young, Huston–Tillotson University, University of Texas at Brownsville

Jeff Wilson is an American academic and serial startup entrepreneur. The pseudonym Professor Dumpster is based upon his role as part of 'The Dumpster Project', an educational and minimalist living experiment that transformed a trash dumpster into a fully sustainable home. Wilson lived in the dumpster over the course of the yearlong project.

== No Cap ==
Wilson co-founded and acted as chief creative officer of the startup No Cap, the first artificial intelligence (AI) early stage investor, along with Alex Nevedovsky in 2025. No Cap was backed by Y Combinator. The company launched virally in March of 2025 with a video of No Cap's first investment - $100k into an agentic AI e-commerce company. The company was acquired by business-building and funding AI company Audos on March 26, 2026, a year to the day of the launch.

== Jupe ==
In 2020, Wilson launched Jupe, a flat-packed 'universal autonomous housing' tech startup that aimed to solve for 1.5B humans in need of housing. Jupe was backed by Y Combinator as part of the Summer 2021 batch and its seed round was led by Garry Tan, then of Initialized Capital. Jupe produced hundreds of units and deployed to over a dozen states. The company sold in 2024.

== Kasita ==
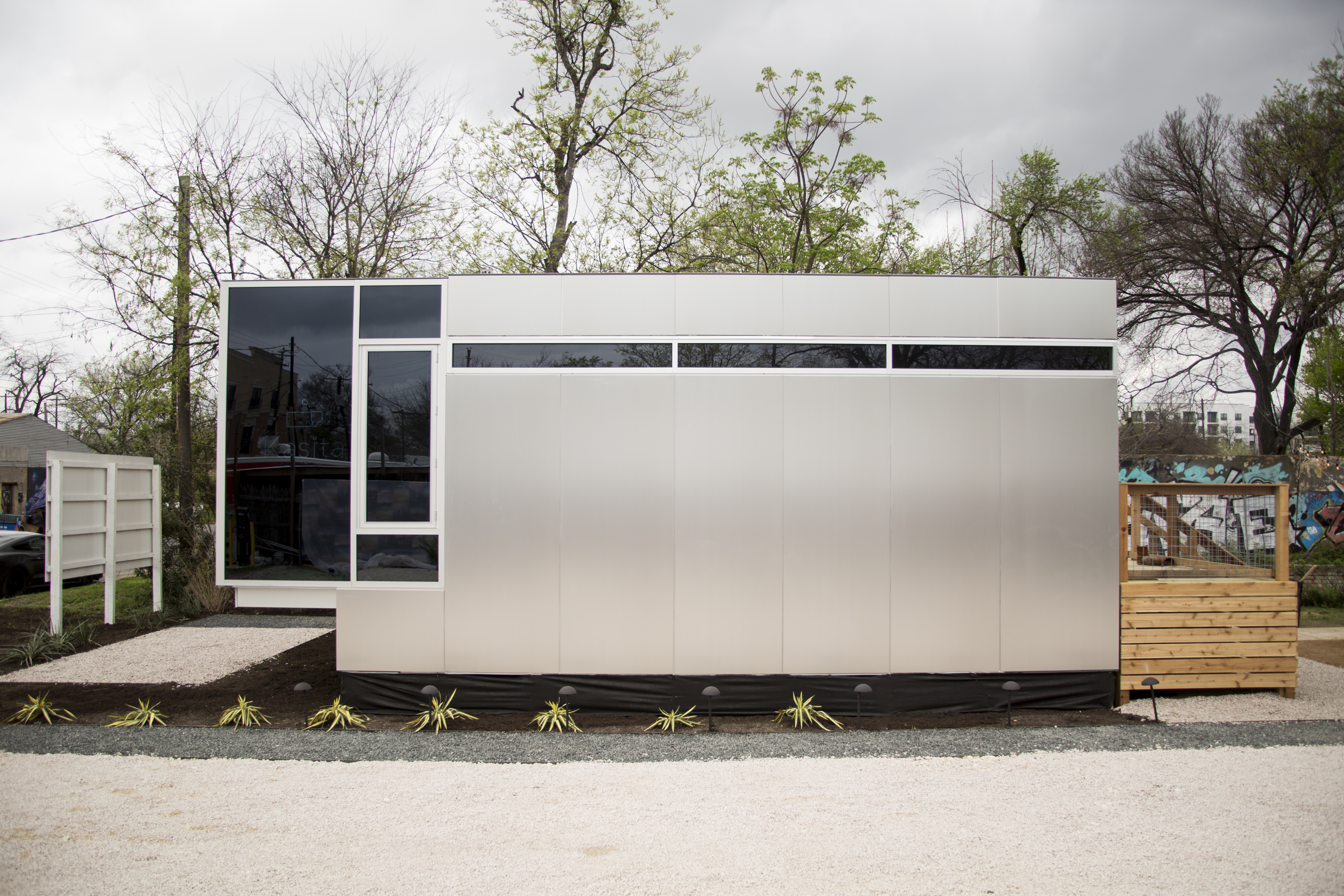
Kasita Exterior

Wilson was a co-founder and CEO at the startup company Kasita. Kasita builds micro smart homes that are capable of stacking. Kasita was named one of Fast Company's Most Innovative Companies and won a SXSW Interactive Innovation Award. Wilson has referred to Kasita as a holistic integrated product, rather than a house. In December 2018, Kasita was sold to a tiny house hotel company in Austin, Texas.

== The Dumpster Project ==
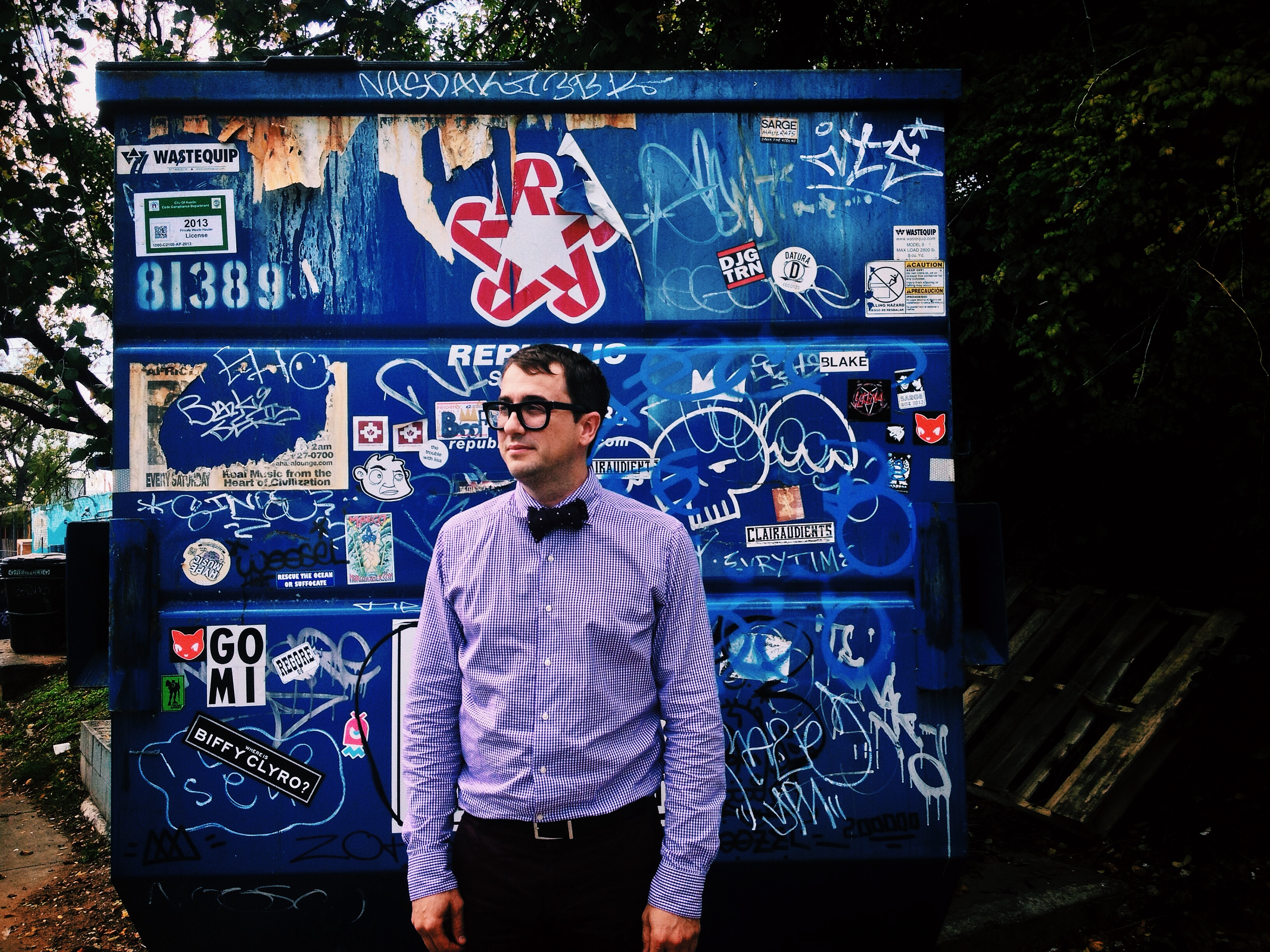
Professor Dumpster in front of a dumpster

Wilson is the chairman and Founder of the 501(c)(3) non-profit 'The Dumpster Project', a STEM educational experiment in which he moved into an empty dumpster and transformed it into a 33 square feet (3.1 m^{2}) environmentally sustainable home. The project has been featured in a variety of local and national news sources. The project won an HBCU Ford Corporation community sustainability grant and a $10,000 Home Depot 'Retool Your School' competition, but a Kickstarter crowd-funding campaign was cancelled a few days before the deadline when it did not reach its goal. The project has received its share of criticism, as commenters have likened the endeavor to "poverty tourism" and noted the self-promotional nature of Wilson's publicity. On August 4, 2014, after six months without electricity, the project moved into the second phase, aiming to create what Wilson referred to as the 'Ultimate Studio Apartment'. Though Wilson moved out of the dumpster in February 2015 short of accomplishing the goal of building a fully functioning home, it remains on the college campus where Wilson worked and has become a rotating space for teachers and educators. On the first night of the new home school program, Austin's Blackshear Elementary Principal Betty Jenkins overnighted in the dumpster. Wilson claims that the dumpster experiment was the central inspiration for Wilson's creation of the startup company, Kasita.

== "No Baggage" experiment ==
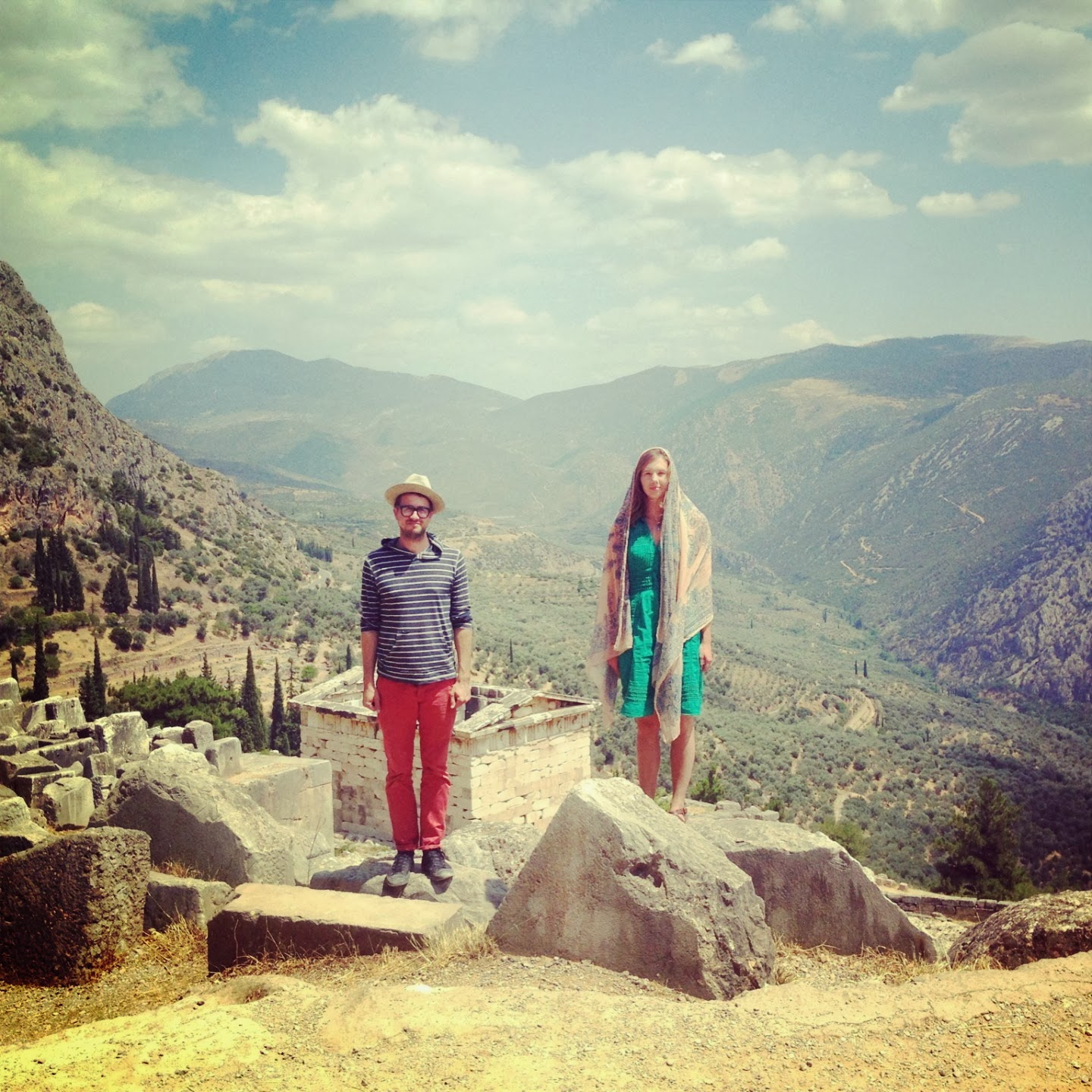
Wilson and Bensen in No Baggage

Together with freelance writer Clara Bensen, Wilson performed the 'travel experiment' "No Baggage", in which they traveled for 21 days through eight countries with no change of clothes shortly after meeting on a dating website. New Line Cinema has acquired the right to produce a feature film and hired Adam Brooks of Bridget Jones to screen write the film based on a book from Perseus Books entitled 'No Baggage' by Bensen. American actress Shailene Woodley has been slated to play Bensen in the film.

== 99 Nights Couchsurfing experiment ==
Subsequent to moving out of the dumpster, Wilson launched a project entitled '99 Nights ATX' in which he aimed to spend 99 nights in 99 different homes across Austin, gaining an up-close and intimate understanding of how Austinites relate to their home spaces. The project is in collaboration with writer Clara Bensen.

== Academic Work ==
Wilson was formerly dean of the University College and an associate professor at Huston–Tillotson University in Austin, Texas. He did post-doctoral work at Harvard, holds a PhD in Environmental Science from the University of Canterbury and is the recipient of a University of Texas Systems' Regents' Outstanding Teaching Award, the largest monetary teaching award in the United States. Wilson has authored numerous publications in the environmental science field and has received funding from the National Science Foundation.
