= Juventud Uruguaya de Pie =

Uruguayan Youth Standing
- Juventud Uruguaya de Pie
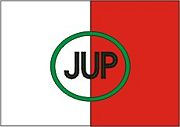
- Formation: 29 October 1970
- Dissolved: 1974
- Type: Student organization
- Purpose: Activism
- Headquarters: Av. 18 de Julio, Montevideo
- Location: Uruguay
- Region served: National
- Official language: Spanish
- Key people: Daniel García Pintos

The Uruguayan Youth Standing or Uruguayan Youth at Attention (Spanish: Juventud Uruguaya de Pie) was a right to far-right student organization in Uruguay during the 1970s.

This relatively short-lived organization (it was dissolved in 1974) had a Patriotic and anti-Communist orientation and was opposed to the insurgency of the Tupamaros and other far-left organizations. It experienced rapid growth, but its armed struggle efforts were relatively less successful. A factional undercurrent of the group desired a national revolution along the lines of Falangism.

The main colours of their flag represent the two traditional major Uruguayan political parties: the National Party (white) and the Colorado Party (red). Presidents Jorge Pacheco Areco and Juan María Bordaberry both spoke positively of the group.

== Bibliography ==
- Bucheli, Gabriel (2019). O se está con la patria o se está contra ella. Montevideo: Fin de Siglo. ISBN 9789974499744.
