= Artiguism =

Political ideas of José Gervasio Artigas

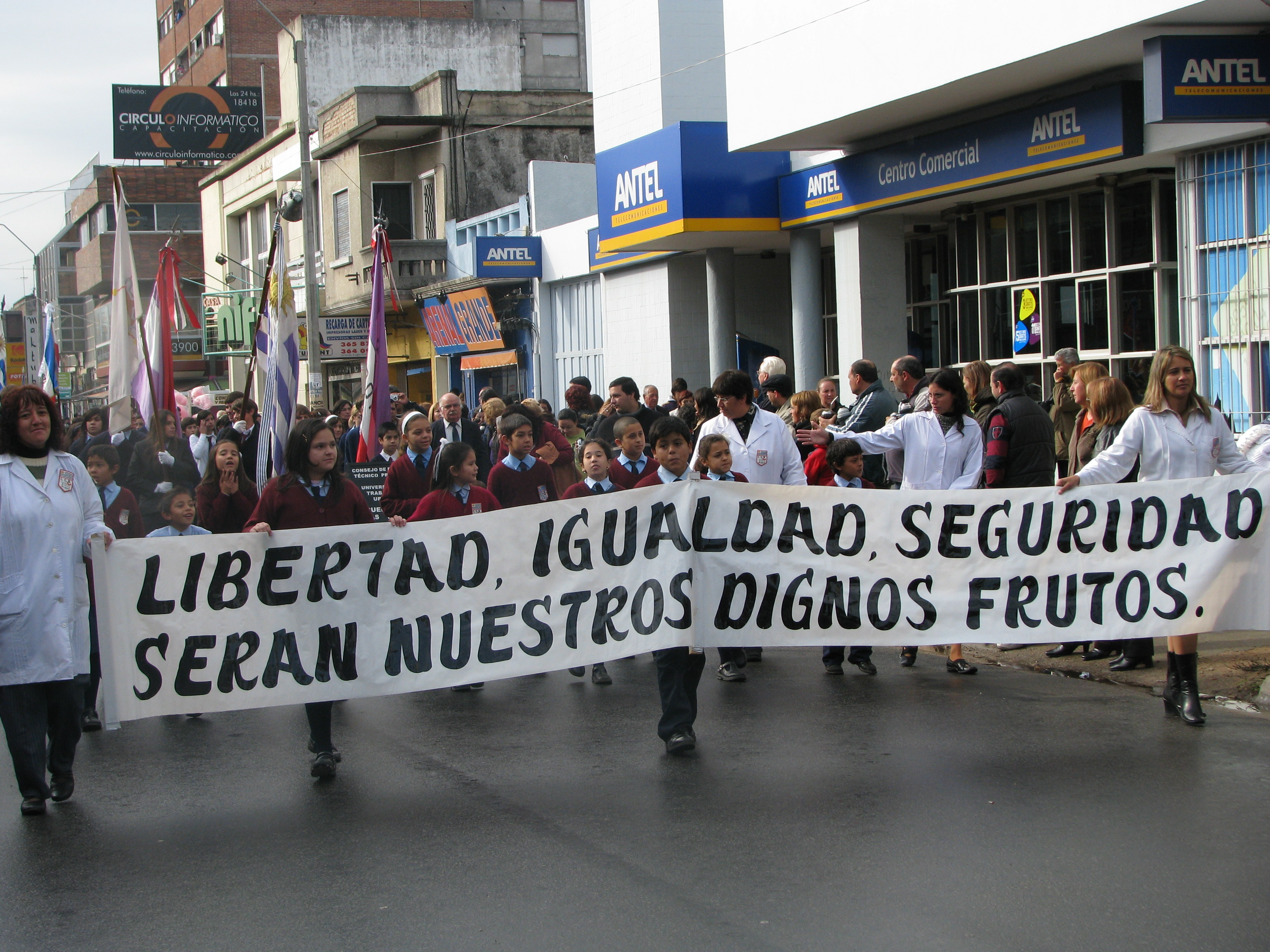
"Let freedom, equality and security be our worthy fruit". Parade in Uruguay honoring the Artiguist thought.

Artiguism (Spanish: Artiguismo) is the set of political, economic and social ideas of José Gervasio Artigas, the main leader of the Oriental Revolution held in the Oriental Province of the United Provinces of the Río de la Plata, which was a predecessor of the modern Oriental Republic of Uruguay.

== Sources of Inspiration ==
Artiguism has two main sources: the works of American authors such as Thomas Paine (supporters of federalism) and the French authors of the Enlightenment as Jean-Jacques Rousseau. Artigas read books in his teens such as "Common Sense" by Paine and "The Social Contract" by Rousseau.

The ideology of Artigas is partially taken from the U.S. legal texts. American political liberalism exerted a strong influence on him. Other Hispanic independence leaders, however, were more influenced by the French Revolution and the authors of France. Some historians, such as Eugenio Petit Muñoz and Ariosto González, have shown that paragraphs of artiguist documents were taken directly from "The Independence of the Mainland Justified by Thomas Paine, Thirty Years Ago," a work which was published by Paine in Philadelphia in 1811 and translated immediately into Spanish. Another source for artiguist writing was the "Concise History of the United States" by John McCulloch. Artigas had both books.

The first of the works cited contained a large appendix of documents with the United States Declaration of Independence, the Federal Constitution of 1787 and the State Constitutions of Massachusetts, New Jersey, Pennsylvania and Virginia.

Artigas was educated at a Franciscan Catholic school, from which he retired to the ranches of his father, which were located in the current land bordering Villa de Casupá. In the first stage of his life he was not influenced by revolutionary ideas. His education was not very orthodox, although he showed flashes of brilliance. They chroniclers at the time of purification, when he had 3 or 4 secretaries, reported that he dictated letters simultaneously to the four, with surprising clarity. Those were related to administrative and political organization, through diplomatic letters and minor issues as refunds of goods to villagers, or set pensions for widows and children of its fighters killed in action. During his association with the campaign he gained experience for the revolution which took place later.

In the opinion of author Carlos Maggi, Artigas was influenced in his teens by his relationship with the natives, black peoples and gauchos. He mixed his roots, his readings and his contact with high society in Montevideo and the outcasts.

== Ideas ==
The Artiguist ideology consisted of political ideas, which were expressed in the Instructions of the Year XIII and the establishment of the League of the Free Peoples. His socioeconomic ideas were expressed in the Regulation of Land, the Provisional Regulations of the Eastern Province for the Promotion of Safety Campaign and its Planters and the Provisional Regulation on Tariffs for the Confederated Provinces of the Banda Oriental del Paraná. Other sources of Artiguist thought are the speech to the Congress in Tres Cruces, the Mercedes Proclamation, General Ordinance Corso and the "Treaty on the Security of Free Trade between England and the Ports of the Banda Oriental del Rio de la Plata" signed between Artigas and Britain in August 1817.

Artigas' primary ideals included:

- Independence from the Spanish and Portuguese Empire.
- Formation of a confederation between the former provinces of the Viceroyalty of the Río de la Plata.
- Political organization as a republic with separation of the three powers.
- Organization embodied in a written constitution.
- Civil and religious liberty.
- Government focused on the preservation of equality, liberty and the security of citizens.
- An independent capital outside of Buenos Aires.
- Free trade among the provinces of the confederation.
- Freedom of the port of Maldonado and Colonia del Sacramento for all ships.
- Solution to the Countryside Agreement by:
  - Distribution of land to free Negros, free Zambos, natives, poor Criollos, and needy widows with children.
  - Expropriation of the land of emigrants that have not been pardoned for having their old properties and land sold or donated by Montevideo between 1810 and 1815.
  - Reformation of ranching practices.
  - Ban on livestock exports to Brazil.
  - Obligation of landowners to register their workers and the prosecution of those who did not have registration from their employers.

== See also ==
- Instructions of the Year XIII
