= Laura Raffo =

Uruguayan economist, businessman and politician (born 1973)

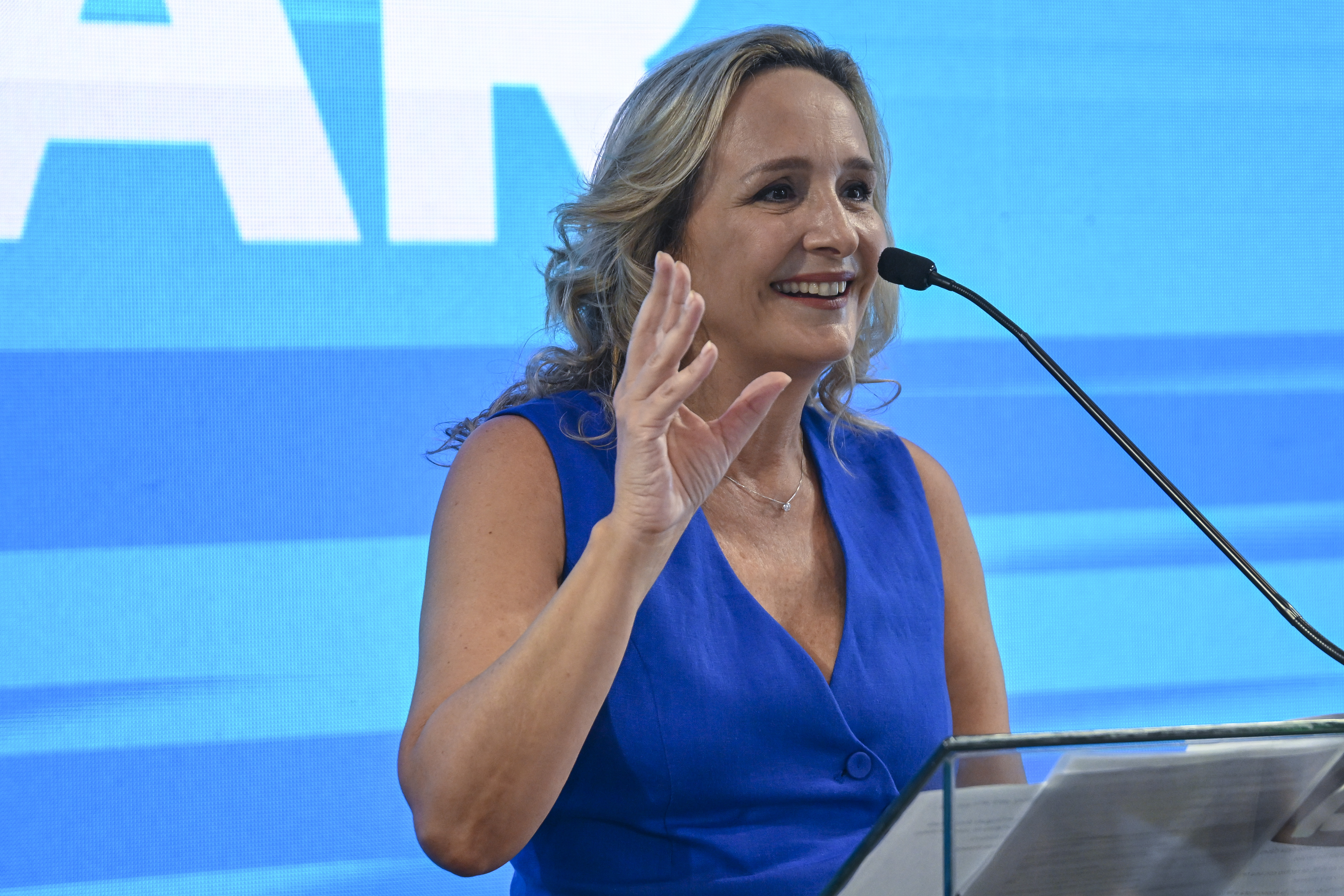

President of the Montevideo Departmental Commission of the National Party
- In office 14 December 2020 – 8 May 2023
- Preceded by: Juan Jose Olaizola
- Succeeded by: Pedro Jisdonian

Personal details
- Born: María Laura Raffo Degeronimi; 22 September 1973 (age 53) Montevideo, Uruguay
- Party: National Party
- Spouse: Federico Muttoni (m. 2005; div. 2014)
- Children: 2
- Parent(s): Juan Carlos Raffo; Marta Degeronimi
- Relatives: Juan Carlos Raffo Frávega (great-grandfather); Jorge Pinto (cousin)
- Education: University of the Republic; University of Montevideo
- Occupation: Businesswoman; Economist; Politician; Television columnist

María Laura Raffo Degeronimi (born 22 September 1973) is a Uruguayan economist, businesswoman, and politician of the National Party. She began her political career in 2020 as the candidate of the Coalición Multicolor for the municipal elections of that year.

Born in Montevideo, she graduated from the University of the Republic with a degree in economics and earned an MBA from the University of Montevideo. She rose to prominence serving as a columnist on economic issues on the Telemundo 12 newscast and various television programs.

== Early life ==
Raffo was born in Montevideo on 22 September 1973, the daughter of politician and writer Juan Carlos Raffo and Marta Degeronimi. She has two siblings, Verónica and Juan Carlos. Raffo is of Italian and Portuguese descent. Portuguese politician Jorge Pinto is her distant cousin.

Raised in the neighborhood of Prado, she attended the Lycée Français of Montevideo. In her teens, she won the National Literature Award for poetry. In 1992, she enrolled in the Faculty of Economic Sciences and Administration of the University of the Republic, graduating in 1998 as an economist. She subsequently obtained a master's degree in business administration from the University of Montevideo.

== Career ==
While she was studying at the university, she got a job position in the newspaper El Observador to write the economics column. She was later employed by the Uruguayan branch of the ManpowerGroup corporation, as manager of the recruiting area. In 2003 she made her television debut, as a panelist on the Channel 10 debate program Zona Urbana. That year he worked as a columnist on the radio together with the journalist and broadcaster Néber Araujo in FM Setiembre.

From 2004 to 2008 she worked for Microsoft and later began hosting an economics segment on Teledoce's Telemundo 12 newscast, which brought her wide national recognition. She served as the executive director of Endeavor Uruguay. From 2013 to 2017, she was a leading economist and image representative of Grupo Sura and was a member of the board of directors of the Banco Santander branch from February 2018 to February 2020.

She worked as a columnist in the television program, Código País, broadcast by Teledoce. In 2016 she published the book La Economía al alcance de todos. From August 2021 to 2022 she was part of the panel of Todas las voces, a debate program aired on Channel 4.

== Political career ==
=== 2020 campaign for Intendant of Montevideo ===
In early February 2020, it was confirmed that Raffo would be the candidate for Intendant of Montevideo for the Coalición Multicolor in the 2020 municipal elections. In the following days, she was approved conventions of the National, Colorado, Independent, Open Cabildo and De La Gente parties, members of the electoral coalition. The candidacy was made official on February 11, at the launch, Raffo stated that it is necessary to take care of "the problems of every day of the people".

On July 23, in the presentation of the government plan dedicated to cleaning up the city, the National Representative for Montevideo of the Ecologist Radical Intransigent Party (PERI), César Vega, officially supported Raffo stating that she would be the "person who is going to do things better for Montevideo", and urged PERI voters to vote for her.

The closing of the campaign was held on September 24 with an act in Varela Square. On election day, Raffo obtained 39.3% of the votes, being the most voted individual candidate, but this percentage was not enough to obtain the government of Montevideo, due to the double simultaneous voting system.

On December 14, 2020, she was proclaimed president of the Montevideo Departmental Commission of the National Party, in a ceremony that was attended by Vice President Beatriz Argimón. On June 9, 2021, she launched the Centro de Estudios Metropolitano, with the purpose of "promoting a serious and professional debate" about what concerns Montevideo people."

=== 2024 presidential campaign ===
On May 8, 2023, Raffo announced her resignation from the position of president of the National Party's Montevideo Departmental Commission. She confirmed that she would not run for Intendant of Montevideo in the 2025 municipal elections. The announcement came after months of speculation about her leap into national politics by 2024.

On May 15, 2023, the National Alliance faction made official its support for Raffo's candidacy for the 2024 presidential primaries, promoted by Herrerism, including, among others, Carlos Camy and Jorge Larrañaga Vidal (son of the late Jorge Larrañaga). In June, Rocha's National Movement also announced its support for her candidacy, and in July Raffo officially launched her faction within the party, Sumar.

In the National Party primary election on June 30, 2024, Raffo obtained 19.2% of the vote, placing second behind Álvaro Delgado Ceretta who was elected the party's candidate for that year's general election.

== Personal life ==
In 2005, she married Federico Muttoni. They had twin children born in 2007. The couple divorced nine years later.
