= 2024 Uruguayan presidential primaries =

Presidential primary elections were held in Uruguay on 30 June 2024 in order to nominate the presidential candidate for every political party in the general election on 27 October 2024.

== Background ==
The formally called elecciones internas (Spanish for 'Internal elections') are the first stage of the electoral system established by the Constitution of 1997. In this election, the only candidates for President of Uruguay per party for the general election will be elected. In addition, the integration of the National Deliberative Body and the different Departmental Deliberative Bodies of the different parties, which will have the function of nominating the candidate for president and vice president of each party, and the candidates for mayors for the municipal elections of 2025 will be also elected.

In accordance with the transitory provisions of the Constitution, the primary electionsare held on the last Sunday of June of the electoral year, and those "qualified to vote"—all those over 18 years of age and registered in the Civic Registry and with a civic credential―can participate in the secret and non-compulsory suffrage.

In order to win the primary election and be proclaimed a presidential candidate, the pre-candidate must obtain an absolute majority of the party's valid votes. In the event that no pre-candidate obtains that majority, the winner will be the one that exceeds 40% of the votes and leads the second by no less than 10 percentage points. If none of these circumstances occur, the deliberative body elected in the election will nominate the party's candidate for president by an absolute majority of its members.

The participation of the parties in the elections is mandatory. In addition, each one had to obtain at least 500 votes to participate in the general elections.

== Pre-candidates ==
The following is a list of the pre-candidates of parties that had an internal election:

=== National Party ===
Due to the fact that immediate re-election is not allowed in Uruguay according to Article One Hundred and Fifty-Two of the Constitution, President Luis Lacalle Pou cannot run for office again.

Name	Born	Experience	Supporting factions	Vote	Ref
Álvaro Delgado Ceretta	11 March 1969 (age 56) Montevideo	Secretary of the Presidency (2020–2023); Senator of the Republic (2015–2020); National Representative from Montevideo (2005–2010)	Aire Fresco – Lista 404; Espacio 40 – Lista 40; Mejor País – Lista 430; Manuel Oribe Group; D Centro Group	241,872 (74.4%)	
Laura Raffo Degeronimi	22 September 1973 (age 52) Montevideo	Economist and businesswoman Member of the Board of Banco Santander in Uruguay; Candidate for Intendant of Montevideo in 2020	Herrerism – Lista 71; National Alliance – Lista 2004; Rocha's National Movement – Lista 504; Lista 903	62,406 (19.2%)	
Jorge Gandini Astesiano	5 March 1958 (age 67); Montevideo	Senator of the Republic (2020–present); President of the Chamber of Representatives (2018–2019); National Representative from Montevideo (2005–2020)	Por la Patria – Lista 250	18,953 (5.8%)	
Carlos Iafigliola Pimentel	1 February 1963 (age 62); Montevideo	Member of the Legislature of Montevideo (2005–2015)	Adelante – Lista 252	841 (0.3%)	
Roxana Corbran Rizzo	20 September 1963 (age 62); Montevideo		Fuerza Nacionalista - Lista 1007; Red Wilsonista; Blancos Federales; Unión Blanca Republicana; Tiempo de Cambio	571 (0.2%)	
Invalid votes				265	
Total				324,908 (33.43%)	

=== Broad Front ===
Name	Born	Experience	Supporting factions	Vote	Ref
Yamandú Orsi Martínez	13 June 1967 (age 58); Canelones	Intendant of Canelones (2015– Feb 2020; Nov 2020–2024)	Movement of Popular Participation – Lista 609; Vertiente Artiguista – Lista 77; PAIS – Lista 52; La Patriada; Compromiso Frenteamplista – Lista 711; Rumbo de Izquierda – Lista 642; PAR – Lista 182; Frente en Movimiento – Lista 764; Ir – Lista 329; Espacio de Integración Frenteamplista – Lista 939; Movimiento Alternativa Socialista – Lista 959	243,407 (59.1%)	
Carolina Cosse Garrido	25 December 1962 (age 62); Montevideo	Intendant of Montevideo (2020–present); Minister of Industry, Energy and Mining (2015–2019); President of ANTEL (2010–2015)	Communist Party – Lista 1001; Socialist Party – Lista 90; Revolutionary Workers' Party – Lista 871; La amplia – Lista 42020; Casa grande – Lista 3311; Movimiento Sumemos; Congreso Frenteamplista – Lista 6009; Movimiento Cambio Frenteamplista – Lista 5005; New Space – Lista 99000; Espacio De Frente – Lista 1303; Partido por la Victoria del Pueblo – Lista 567; Partido Socialista de los Trabajadores – Lista 1968; Brazo Libertador – Lista 611; Corriente de Izquierda – Lista 527	154,717 (37.6%)	
Andrés Lima Proserpio	Octubre 31, 1973 (age 50); Salto	Intendant of Salto (2015–present); National Representative from Salto (2010–2015)	Seregnistas de a pie – Lista 319; Corriente Progresista Independiente – Lista 606; Izquierda Democrática – Lista 933; Liga Federal Montevideo – Lista 1813; Agrupación Nuevo Frente; Agrupación Todos Nosotros; Espacio Celeste; Frenteamplistas Independientes; Agrupación Unión; Frente Común; Banderas de Líber – Lista 1312	12,244 (3.1%)	
Invalid votes				582	
Total				411,550 (42.36%)	

=== Colorado Party ===
Name	Born	Experience	Supporting factions	Vote	Ref
Andrés Ojeda Spitz	5 January 1984 (age 41); Montevideo	Criminal defense lawyer Member of the Legislature of Montevideo (2010–2015)	Batllistas	40,040 (39.5%)	
Robert Silva García	7 March 1971 (age 54); Tacuarembó	President of ANEP (2020–2023)	Ciudadanos	22,790 (22.4%)	
Gabriel Gurméndez Armand-Ugon	4 July 1961 (age 64); Montevideo	President of ANTEL (2020–2023; 2002–2004); Minister of Transport and Public Works (2004)	Lista 15; Lista 30	18,908 (18.6%)	
Tabaré Viera Duarte	7 April 1955 (age 70); Rivera	Minister of Tourism (2021–2024); Senator of the Republic (2020–2021); President of ANTEL (1998–2000) Intendant of Rivera (2005–2014)	Batllistas – Lista 2000; Vamos Salto; Pachequismo – Lista 1021; Lista 1010	18,303 (18.0%)	
Carolina Ache Batlle	19 November 1980 (age 45); Montevideo	Deputy Minister of Foreign Relations (2020–2023)	Lista 919; Lista 10	1,158 (1.1%)	
Invalid votes				203	
Total				101,718 (10.47%)	

== Results ==
Party	Presidential candidate	Candidate votes		Overall votes	
Party	Presidential candidate	Votes	%	Votes	%
Broad Front	Yamandú Orsi Martínez	243,407	59,1	411,550	42.36
Broad Front	Carolina Cosse Garrido	154,717	37,6	411,550	42.36
Broad Front	Andrés Lima Proserpio	12,844	3,1	411,550	42.36
National Party	Álvaro Delgado Ceretta	241,872	74.4	324,908	33.43
National Party	Laura Raffo Degeronimi	62,406	19.2	324,908	33.43
National Party	Jorge Gandini Astesiano	18,953	8.5	324,908	33.43
National Party	Carlos Iafigliola Pimentel	841	0.3	324,908	33.43
National Party	Roxana Corbran Rizzo	571	0.2	324,908	33.43
Colorado Party	Andrés Ojeda Spitz	40,179	39.5	101,718	10.47
Colorado Party	Robert Silva García	22,790	22.4	101,718	10.47
Colorado Party	Gabriel Gurméndez Armand-Ugon	18,908	18.6	101,718	10.47
Colorado Party	Tabaré Viera Duarte	18,303	18.0	101,718	10.47
Colorado Party	Carolina Ache Batlle	1,165	1.1	101,718	10.47
Colorado Party	Zaida González Legnani	170	0.2	101,718	10.47
Open Cabildo	Guido Manini Ríos	17 282	1.78	17 282	1.78
Sovereign Identity	Gustavo Salle	4658	0.48	4658	0.48
Independent Party	Pablo Mieres Gómez	2802	0.29	2802	0.29
Popular Assembly	Walter Martínez Maruca	2174	0.29	2802	0.22
Environmental Constitutional	Eduardo Lust Hitta	1176	0.12	1176	0.12
Green Animalist Party	Rita Rodríguez González	1084	78.7	1377	0.14
Green Animalist Party	Raúl Viñas Ortiz	293	21.3	1377	0.14
Republican Coalition	Juan Ortomin Gómez	1041	0.11	1041	0.11
Basta Ya	Jorge Bonica Sierra	1035	0.11	1035	0.11
PERI	César Vega Erramuspe	867	0.09	867	0.09
Party for Necessary Changes	Guillermo Franchi Soria	719	0.07	719	0.07
Advance Republican	Felipe Pérez Banchero	572	0.06	572	0.06
Libertarian Party (Note: The party did not exceed the threshold of 500 votes necessary to compete in the general election)	Nelson Petkovich Moll	486			
Alternative Homeland (Note: The party did not exceed the threshold of 500 votes necessary to compete in the general election)	Javier Sciuto Olivera	380			
Harmony Party (Note: The party did not exceed the threshold of 500 votes necessary to compete in the general election)	Ruben Martínez Izaguirre	340			
Devolución (Note: The party did not exceed the threshold of 500 votes necessary to compete in the general election)	Pablo Paiva Fiures	314			
Blank votes				5,711	
Total				971,659	
Valid votes				971,659	
Invalid votes				7,408	
Total votes				989,829	

== See also ==
- 2024 Uruguayan general election
