= Verónica Alonso =

Uruguayan politician

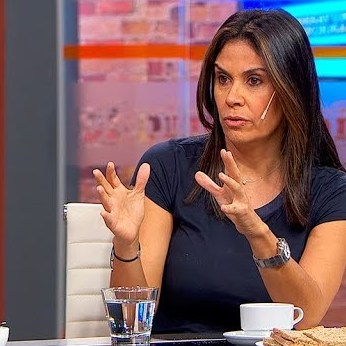

Senator of Uruguay
- In office 15 February 2015 – 15 February 2020

Representative of Uruguay for Montevideo
- In office 15 February 2010 – 15 February 2015

Personal details
- Born: Verónica María Alonso Montaño; 24 October 1973 (age 52) Montevideo, Uruguay
- Party: National Party
- Spouse: Marcel Gerwer (m. 2000)
- Children: Camila, Delfina, Violeta

Verónica María Alonso Montaño (born October 24, 1973) is a Uruguayan businesswoman and politician of the National Party. She served as a Senator of the Republic from 2015 to 2020 and as a National Representative from 2010 to 2015.

== Early life and education ==
Alonso was born in Montevideo in 1973. She has five brothers and was raised as a Catholic. She began studying International Relations at the University of the Republic, but obtained her degree from the Universidad ORT Uruguay. She holds a postgraduate Diploma in International Relations and Latin American Political Development from Miguel de Cervantes University in Santiago. She has completed the coursework, but has pending delivery and defense of the thesis for a master's degree in Integration and International Trade at the Law School of the University of Montevideo.

== Political career ==
She began her political career in the Wilsonist Current, a faction of the National Party, supporting then-senator Francisco Gallinal. In the 2009 general election, she backed former president Luis Alberto Lacalle Herrera and was elected National Representative for Montevideo Department. Her first legislative initiative was to propose to the Chamber of Representatives to exempt private companies from paying employer contributions for workers over forty years old.

In the 2014 presidential primaries, Alonso supported Senator Jorge Larrañaga, who lost the internal election of the National Party to Luis Lacalle Pou. In the general election of that year, with Lacalle Pou as the candidate for the National Party, she joined the National Alliance faction, being elected Senator of the Republic.

In July 2018, Alonso announced her presidential pre-candidacy for the 2019 presidential primaries. However, on April 8, 2019, she withdrew her candidacy to support the nomination of businessman Juan Sartori, stating "we are going to define the intern of the National Party." Ultimately, Lacalle Pou defeated Sartori in the presidencial primaries, and was the candidate of the PN in the 2019 general election. Alonso ran for reelection as Senator, but was not elected.

In July 2020, Alonso claimed in an interview that she had been wrong to support Juan Sartori's nomination, stating "I made a wrong decision, but I can't turn back time." As a consequence, Sartori's supporter faction reported that Alonso had been "excluded" from it.

== Private life ==
Alonso married Marcel Gerwer in 2000 and they have three daughters: Camila, Delfina and Violeta. She was raised as a Catholic but converted to Judaism at the time of her marriage.

During the COVID-19 pandemic in Uruguay, a hotel owned by her family let rooms at $7 a day, with fees paid by the state to provide homeless people with a place to stay. The Hotel Urban Express is owned by her husband's family and is normally charged at $45 a night. It was noted that other hotels had refused to allow homeless individuals to use their facilities, and at $7 a night, the hotel would not cover its costs. Critics were told that $7 a night was not a charge, but virtually a donation.
