= Euthanasia in Uruguay =

Current status of euthanasia around the world: Active voluntary euthanasia legal Passive euthanasia legal (refusal of treatment / withdrawal of life support) Active euthanasia illegal, passive euthanasia not legislated or regulated All forms of euthanasia illegal

Euthanasia became legal in Uruguay with the so called Muerte Digna (Spanish for 'Dignified Death Bill') which was promulgated in October 2025. It recognises the right of mentally sound adults in the terminal stage of an incurable and irreversible disease to request euthanasia to be administered by a doctor on their behalf, this procedure is known as active euthanasia.

Any patient who requests to be euthanized will first need to get a doctor’s counsel and approval, and then that of a second doctor independent of the first one or a medical board in case of disagreement between the first two. The patient will then undergo another interview, and finally, they will have to ratify their decision before two witnesses at least one of whom shall not receive any financial benefit due to the death of the declarant.

According to the law, the physician and other members of the healthcare may validly object to provide their services for reasons of religion or conscience under the figure of conscientious objector. In such a case, the healthcare institution will determine who should replace them, always ensuring the provision of the service.

== Background ==
The 1933 Penal Code of Uruguay was among the first legal documents to include a provision relating to euthanasia. It allowed judges, in its article 37, to pardon the so called "merciful homicide" stating that:

Article 37. Judges have the power to exonerate from punishment a person with an honorable record who commits a homicide, carried out out of mercy, through repeated pleas from the victim.

This de facto permissive stance has led the Hungarian medical journal Orvosi Hetilap to consider Uruguay as having legalised a form of active euthanasia.

In 2009 parliament approved the "Anticipated Will Law" or "Good Dying Law", which explicitly recognised the freedom of a patient of legal age and mentally fit, voluntarily, consciously and freely to refuse treatment, including palliative care in the case of a terminal, incurable and irreversible illness, this procedure is known as passive euthanasia.

== Dignified Death Bill ==
A bill to legalize active euthanasia under conditions of specific terminal illnesses was first promoted in 2020 under the 49th Legislature of the Uruguayan General Assembly by Colorado Party senator Ope Pasquet, but even though it had the support of the majority-party Broad Front it never got Senate approval after Pasquet failed to gain his party's support given internal differences.

Five years later, during the 50th Legislature, the bill was taken up again for consideration. Due to Uruguay’s bicameral system, the bill required approval from both chambers of Parliament. On 13 August 2025, the Chamber of Representatives approved the initiative with 64 votes in favour out of 93. Subsequently, on 15 October 2025, the Senate approved and promulgated the bill into law, adopting the text passed by the lower house, with 20 votes in favour out of 31. Support came from the entire Broad Front caucus, Graciela Bianchi of the National Party, and Ope Pasquet of the Colorado Party—who, acting as substitute for Robert Silva, was granted the seat in a symbolic gesture acknowledging his role in drafting the legislation—as well as Colorado Party senator Heber Duque.
