= Jorge Gandini =

Uruguayan politician

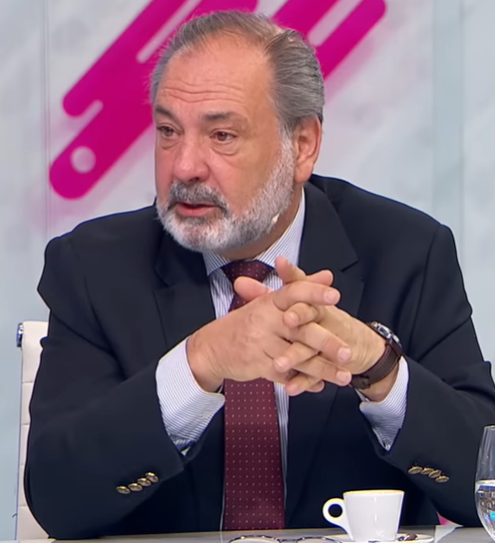

Senator of the Republic
- In office February 15, 2020 – 15 February 2025

Personal details
- Born: Jorge Osvaldo Gandini Astesiano; 5 March 1958 (age 68) Montevideo, Uruguay
- Party: National
- Spouse: Laura Scalabrino Muga
- Children: 3
- Occupation: Politician

Jorge Osvaldo Gandini Astesiano (born 5 May 1958) is a Uruguayan politician who served as Senator of the Republic from 2020 to 2025, as National Representative from 2005 to 2020 and as president of the Chamber from 2018 to 2019. A member of the National Party, he was a candidate in its 2024 presidential primary.

== Early life and education ==
Jorge Gandini Astesiano was born on May 5, 1958, in the Aires Puros neighborhood of Montevideo, the eldest son of a newsstand and a public official, both supporters of the Colorado Party. He attended School Israel and Liceo 21. He studied law at the University of the Republic, however he dropped out in his fourth year.

== Political career ==
Gandini became a member of the National Party while he was studying at university during the campaign for the 1980 constitutional referendum.

In the 1984 election, he was elected alternate National Representative for the 42nd Legislature. From 1985 to 1987 he served as secretary of the youth wing of the National Party, and between 1985 and 1988 as secretary of the youth of the Por la Patria sector.

During the Lacalle Herrera administration, he was the first director of the National Youth Institute (INJU), a position he held until 1995, and from that position he promoted the 'Youth Card' program. At the same time and since 1992, he presided over the National Post Office of Uruguay.

In 1994 he endorsed Alberto Volonté for president, by joining the Propuesta Nacional sector led by Álvaro Ramos Trigo. In the election that year Gandini was re-elected as National Representative, but he joined the Senate after the appointment of Ramos Trigo as foreign minister in the administration of Julio María Sanguinetti.

In 2004 he joined the National Alliance and was elected National Representative. For the 2009 presidential primaries he endorsed Jorge Larrañaga for president. Gandini's 2004-50 list was the most voted in Montevideo among those in the National Alliance sector, so he was re-elected National Representative for the 47th Legislature. In June 2012 he announced that he would run for Intendant of Montevideo in the 2015 municipal elections. However, in December 2014 he withdrew his candidacy for the Concertation Party (an alliance between the National and Colorado parties) because the Herrerist faction of the National Party defeated the Wilsonist in that year's election. Instead, the party decided to nominate Álvaro Garcé. Simultaneously, Gandini was re-elected National Representative for the 48th Legislature in the 2014 general election.

In the 2019 presidential primaries Gandini supported Jorge Larrañaga for president. In the general election he supported the party's candidate Luis Lacalle Pou and was elected Senator of the Republic. In the campaign leading up to the referendum on the Law of Urgent Consideration of 2022, Gandini was one of the main National Party politicians in defense of the law.

== Presidential campaign (2023–2024) ==
Gandini declared on several occasions since 2022 that a candidate from the Wilsonist faction of the party should run in the 2024 presidential primaries. He also declared that the other potential nationalist pre-candidates Álvaro Delgado Ceretta and Laura Raffo came from the same party faction, Herrerism. On October 18, 2023 he officially announced his candidacy for president, becoming the first major candidate to announce a run for the 2024 National presidential primaries.

In the National Party primary election on June 30, 2024, Gandini obtained 5,8 % of the vote, placing third behind Álvaro Delgado Ceretta―who was elected the party's candidate for the general election―and Laura Raffo.
