= Gloria Rodríguez Santo =

Uruguayan journalist (born 1960)

Gloria Rodríguez
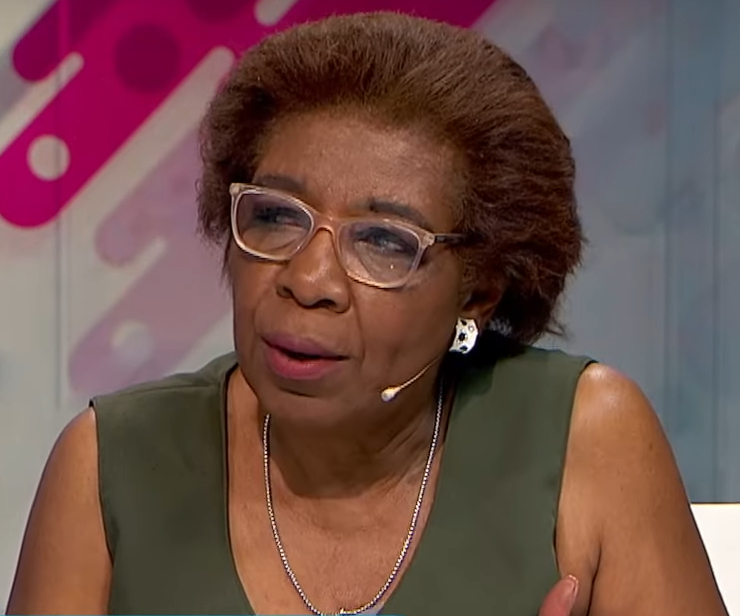
- Rodríguez in 2024

Senator of Uruguay
- In office 15 February 2020 – 15 February 2025

Representative of Uruguay for Montevideo
- In office 15 February 2015 – 15 February 2020

Personal details
- Born: Gloria Rudi Rodríguez Santo; 26 October 1960 (age 65) Melo, Uruguay
- Party: National Party
- Occupation: Journalist; politician

Gloria Rudi Rodríguez Santo (born 26 October 1960) is a Uruguayan journalist, civil servant, activist and politician of the National Party (PN). She served as Senator of the Republic from 2020 to 2025, being the first Afro-Uruguayan woman to hold a senatorial seat.

== Early and personal life ==
Gloria Rodríguez was born in 1960 in Melo, Cerro Largo Department. Her father, was a policeman, and her mother, a domestic worker. Her parents knew Jorge Silveira Zavala, a leader of the National Party in Cerro Largo, who was the one who transmitted the ideology to her. In 1991, she moved to Montevideo with her children and great-grandmother. She settled in the barrio Malvín Norte. She worked as a secretary at the Colegio María Auxiliadora, as a shop assistant and as an official of the Ministry of Transport and Public Works, and the Ministry of Education and Culture. She studied journalism at the Professional Institute of Journalism Teaching (IPEP).

== Political career and activism ==
Rodríguez began her militancy in the 90s, distributing ballots from List 71, of the Herrerism faction of the National Party in Malvín Norte. During the 2002 Uruguay banking crisis, she set up a community soup kitchen, which fed 70 children in the area. Since then she has been dedicated to community work in slums.

She participated in the 2014 general election as a member of Todos, a faction led by Luis Lacalle Pou. She ran for a seat in the Chamber of Deputies, being elected National Representative for the 48th Legislature. She took office on February 15, 2015, becoming the first Afro-Uruguayan woman to hold a seat in the lower house of the General Assembly of Uruguay. In the 2019 election, she was elected Senator for the 49th Legislature. Thus she became the first Afro-Uruguayan woman to hold a senatorial seat in Uruguay. She stated "we have to work a lot so that the fact that a black woman reaches Parliament does not surprise anyone".

She introduced a bill to establish a new gender quota in Parliament. It sought to stipulate a parity system of alternating and sequential order of women and men on each electoral list for the Legislature. It would have modified the Quota Law passed in 2009, which establishes that two out of three places on the list are allocated to one gender and the third to the other. The bill was rejected 15–14 by the Senate.

In mid-September 2024, she announced her departure from Herrerismo and List 71. Days later she joined the centrist sector D Centro, and confirmed that she would be Beatriz Argimón's substitute candidate on the List 5 electoral list.
