= Batlle =

- Coat of arms described by Enrique Rodríguez Fabregat
- Language: Catalan, Occitan, Spanish

Other gender
- Feminine: Baylina

Origin
- Language: Latin
- Origin: baiulus
- Meaning: bailiff
- Region of origin: Limousin

Other names
- Variant form: Batle

Batlle (Catalan pronunciation: [ˈbaʎːə, ˈbaʎːe]), alternatively spelled Batle (pronounced [ˈbalːe, ˈbalːə]), is a Catalan surname that originally came from the Limousin dialect of Occitan.

== Etymology ==
The name derives from the Catalan common noun, batlle, which referred to bailiffs in the sense of overseers of bailiwicks and has the same ultimate origin; a more modern analogue would be the role of mayor, though batlles were considered vassal rulers. This ultimate origin is the Latin term baiulus, someone employed with a degree of responsibility and authority. The Latin term entered Old Occitan as baile before becoming bayle in Occitan (remaining baile in Aragonese) and batlle in the Limousin dialect. It is one of a variety of officeholder titles that became widely used as surnames. In their dictionary, César Conto and Emiliano Isaza noted the ending of the surname Batlle is strange in Spanish, into which it has been adopted, due to originating from different languages.

== Coats of arms ==
The traditional coat of arms of the Catalan (Sitges) family from which descended the Uruguayan Batlle family is described by Enrique Rodríguez Fabregat as being a field of red – "violently red like dawn" – and depicting an arm armoured in silver bearing a silver sword with a golden hilt, the sword facing its bearer: "The arm of this [coat of arms] neither subjugates nor kills. The arm of this [coat of arms] wears armour like Don Quixote's. The sword of this arm has a light like that of Justice."

Coat of arms for the Batlle family of Girona

Another coat of arms, for the Batlle family of Girona, was a field of green with two silver stars at the top and a complex golden cross; the cross potent had two horizontal arms, with its vertical arm providing the upright of the letters A and B. Ignacio Vicente Cascante in his Heráldica General y Fuentes de las Armas de España mentions a Berenguer Batlle whose coat of arms bears green leaves extending out.

== People ==
- Uruguayan Batlle family:
  - Lorenzo Batlle y Grau, President of Uruguay from 1868 to 1872
  - José Batlle y Ordóñez, President of Uruguay from 1903 to 1907 and 1911 to 1915, son of Lorenzo Batlle y Grau
  - Matilde Pacheco, wife of José Batlle y Ordóñez and, previously, his cousin Ruperto Michaelsson Batlle
  - Lorenzo Batlle Pacheco, Uruguayan politician and son of José Batlle y Ordóñez
  - César Batlle Pacheco, Uruguayan politician and son of José Batlle y Ordóñez
  - Rafael Batlle Pacheco, Uruguayan journalist and son of José Batlle y Ordóñez
  - Luis Batlle Berres, President of Uruguay from 1947 to 1951 and 1955 to 1956, nephew of José Batlle y Ordóñez
  - Matilde Ibáñez Tálice, Uruguayan journalist and wife of Luis Batlle Berres
  - Jorge Batlle Ibáñez, President of Uruguay from 2000 to 2005, son of Luis Batlle Berres
  - Mercedes Menafra, Uruguayan entrepreneur, wife of Jorge Batlle Ibáñez
  - Carolina Ache Batlle, Uruguayan politician, Deputy Minister of Foreign Relations of Uruguay since 2020, grand niece of Jorge Batlle Ibáñez
  - José Amorín Batlle, Uruguayan politician, Senator since 2010, first cousin once removed of Jorge Batlle Ibáñez
- Dominican descendants of Ulises Francisco Espaillat:
  - Aída Mercedes Batlle, Dominican political figure, former First Lady of the Dominican Republic
  - Federico Antún Batlle, Dominican politician
  - Julio Vega Batlle, Dominican writer
- Aida Batlle, Salvadoran businesswoman
- Alexis Batle, Cuban volleyball player
- Antonio Enrique Lussón Batlle, Cuban soldier and politician
- Armand Batlle, French rugby union footballer
- Eduard Batlle, Spanish scientist
- Enric Marco, Spanish impostor
- Fernando Clavijo Batlle, Spanish politician, President of the Canary Islands since 2023
- Francesc Cambó, Spanish politician
- Jay Batlle, American artist
- José Perdomo, Uruguayan footballer
- Josep Maria Abella Batlle, Spanish bishop
- Juan Batlle Planas, Spanish-Argentine painter
- Manuel Arturo Peña Batlle, Dominican historian, diplomat, politician and lawyer
- Ona Batlle, Spanish footballer
- Ramón Carnicer, Spanish composer and conductor

== See also ==
- Laurent Batlles, French footballer
