= Marisol Díaz =

Venezuelan politician and activist

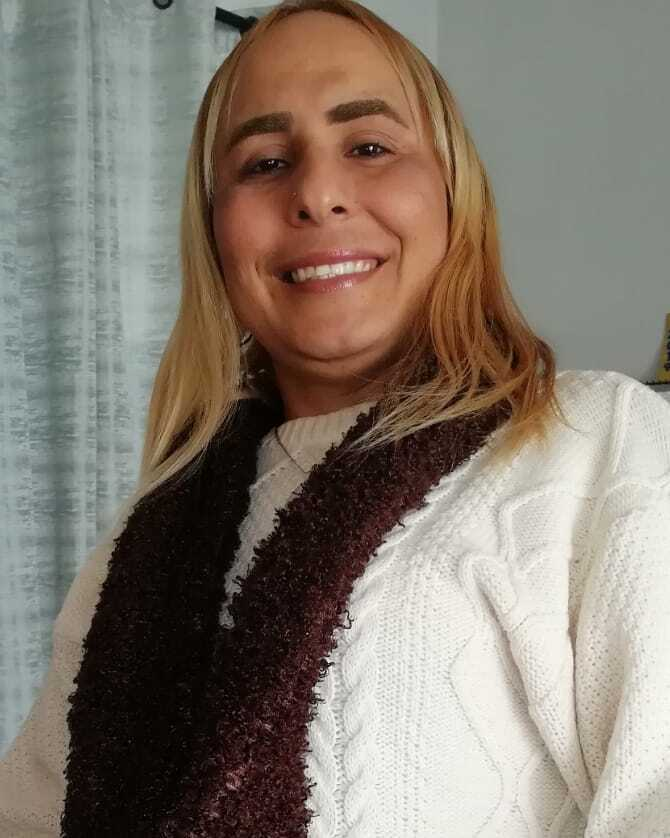
- Marisol Johana Diaz Reyes de Cordova
- Born: 25 September 1985 (age 40); Falcon, Venezuela
- Citizenship: Uruguay
- Education: Business Administration
- Occupations: Politician, activist, writer
- Employer: Melfon sa
- Political party: National Party Democratic Action (previous)
- Spouse: Reinaldo Cordova (2018-present)
- Children: Duvine, Nilson, Rosibel.

Marisol Díaz (born 25 September 1985) is a Venezuelan politician and an activist. After being a member in the political party Democratic Action, Díaz left Venezuela, exiled herself in Uruguay, and later ran in the 2024 Uruguayan primary elections. She became the first immigrant transgender woman to be a member of the National Party.

== Career ==
She was a member of Democratic Action and later had to leave Venezuela. She came to Uruguay in July 2016 and settled in Montevideo. She left due to being prosecuted by the administration of Nicolás Maduro, and also because of the discrimination she has faced in Venezuela.

In 2024 she ran in the primary elections, heading electoral list 350, and supporting the candidacy of Jorge Gandini. She became the first immigrant transgender member of National Party, intending to become the first elected immigrant transgender woman in the General Assembly of Uruguay.

== Personal life ==
Marisol Díaz married in Uruguay and has three children.
