= Jorge Larrañaga Vidal =

Uruguayan lawyer and politician

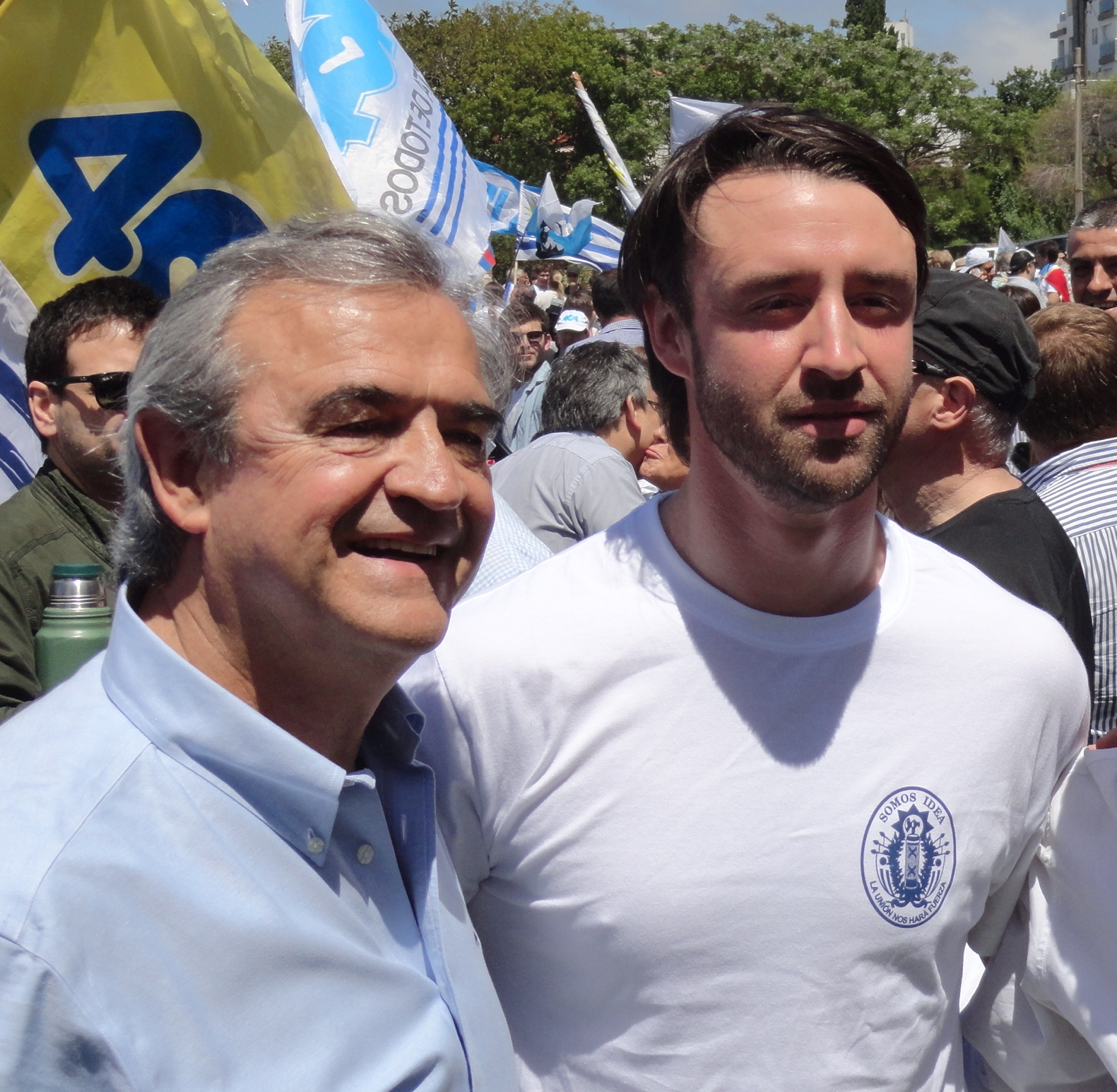
Jorge Larrañaga, father and son, at a political rally in Montevideo, 2019.

Jorge Washington Larrañaga Vidal (born 15 October 1989 in Paysandú) is a Uruguayan lawyer and politician.

== Biography ==
Born in 1989 as the eldest child of Ana María Vidal Elhordoy and Jorge Larrañaga Fraga; he has 3 younger brothers: Aparicio, Juan Francisco, and Faustino.

In 2014 graduated as lawyer from the University of Montevideo.

In 2017 he launched his own political career in the National Party, founding the sector "Juntos podemos". In 2019 he took part in the general elections. Later, he took part in the elections to the Municipality CH in Montevideo; in 2022 he served as substitute for mayoress Matilde Antía.

After the death of his father in 2021, Larrañaga Vidal became a notable figure in their sector, National Alliance. In 2024 he endorsed the presidential candicacy of Laura Raffo. Subsequently he ran for the office of Intendant of Paysandú in 2025.

During the legislative period 2025-2030 he has frequently served as substitute senator for Jorge Botana.
