= Andrés Lima =

Andrés Lima may refer to:

- Andrés Lima (theatre director), Spanish actor and theatre director
- Andrés Lima (politician), Uruguayan politician
