= Carolina Ache =

Uruguayan lawyer and politician

Carolina Ache Batlle
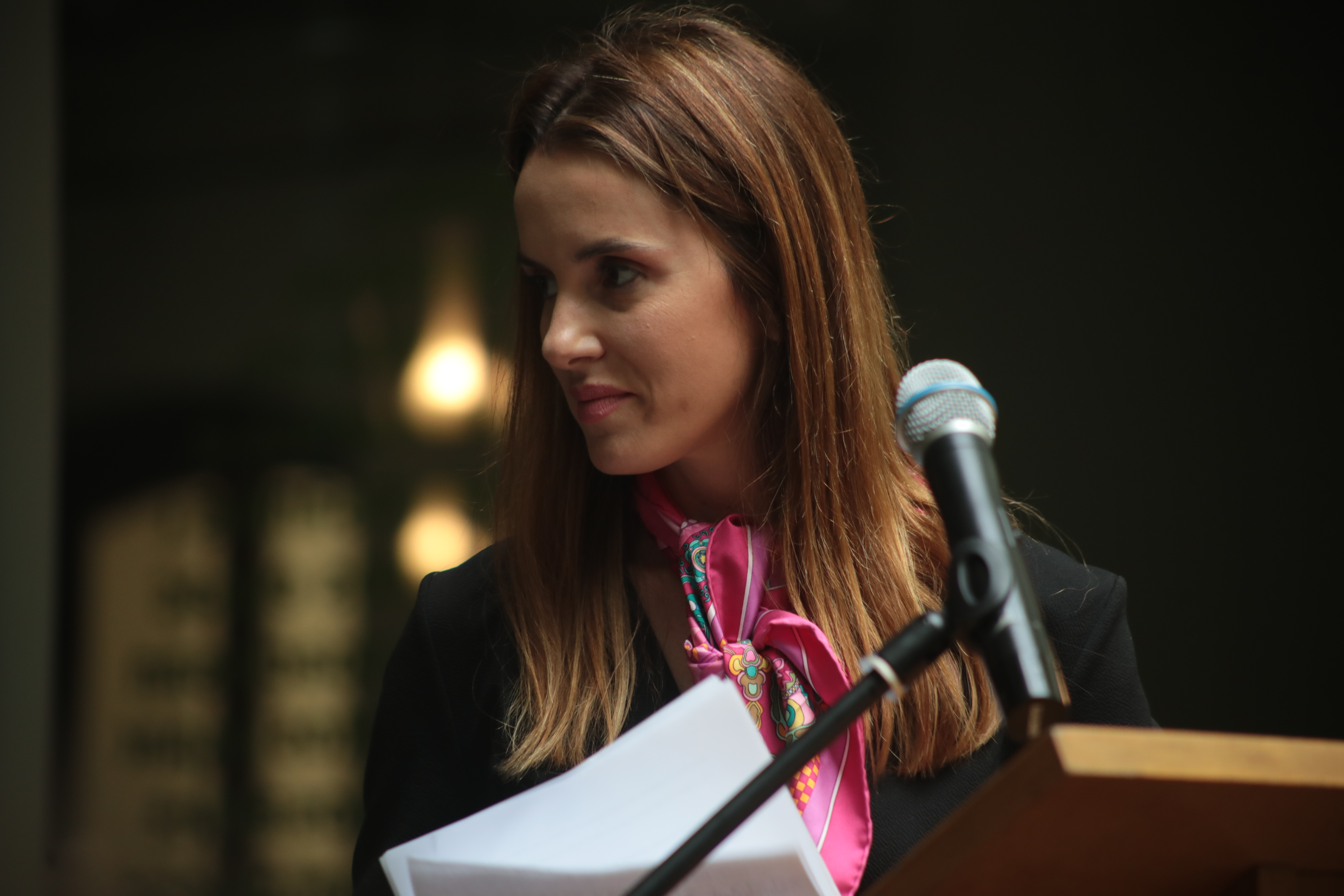

Deputy Minister of Foreign Relations
- In office 1 March 2020 – 19 December 2022
- President: Luis Lacalle Pou
- Preceded by: Ariel Bergamino
- Succeeded by: Nicolás Albertoni

Personal details
- Born: Carolina Ache Batlle; 19 November 1980 (age 45) Montevideo, Uruguay
- Party: Colorado Party
- Spouse: Tomás Romay
- Relations: Batlle family
- Children: 2
- Education: Catholic University of Uruguay; University of Bologna

Carolina Ache Batlle (born 19 November 1980) is a Uruguayan lawyer and politician of the Colorado Party who served as Deputy Minister of Foreign Relations from 1 March 2020 to 19 December 2022. She was a candidate in the 2024 Colorado presidential primaries for president of Uruguay.

== Biography ==
Born into a political family in Montevideo, Ache Batlle graduated from the Catholic University of Uruguay in 2005 with a law degree. After graduating, she obtained a master's degree in International Law at the University of Bologna. Also, in 2007 she completed a technical degree in foreign trade at the Mercosur Technical Institute. In 2006 she carried out a curricular internship at the European Commission in Milan, and from 2008 to 2010, she worked in the Legal and Compliance Department of Banco Santander in Geneva, Switzerland. She is the great-niece of former President Jorge Batlle Ibáñez; and she is married to Tomás Romay, a great-grandson of the late businesswoman Elvira Salvo.

== Political career ==
Ache first competed in the Colorado youth elections in 2007. From 2015 to 2019, she was a member of the National Executive Committee of the Colorado Party and held the position of its Human Rights Prosecutor. In the 2014 presidential primaries, she participated as a member of the group Vamos Adelante, founded a year earlier.

In 2018, Ache was a founding member of Ciudadanos, a faction of the Colorado Party led by Ernesto Talvi. In 2019 she was reelected as a member of the National Executive Committee of her party, and in the presidential primaries of that year she was the most voted woman in her political sector. For the runoff of the general election, she supported the formula of Luis Lacalle Pou-Beatriz Argimón, as a member of the Coalición Multicolor.

Once Lacalle's victory was known, Ache was appointed Deputy Minister of Foreign Relations by the president-elect, on December 16, 2019; she would accompany Ernesto Talvi, who was appointed Minister. She took office on March 1, 2020, becoming the second woman to hold the position, after Belela Herrera. In June, Talvi announced his intention to step down as minister, which was made official on July 1. After much speculation, it was announced that Ambassador Francisco Bustillo would replace Talvi at the head of the Foreign Ministry. Despite the change of minister, Ache was retained in office by President Lacalle Pou on July 6. On December 19, 2022, she resigned from the position, being succeeded by Nicolás Albertoni. A few days later, she submitted her resignation as a member of Ciudadanos.

== See also ==
- List of political families of Uruguay
