= Robert Silva =

Robert Silva may refer to:

- Robert Silva (politician) (born 1971), Uruguayan lawyer, teacher and politician
- Robert Silva (footballer) (born 2005), Brazilian footballer
