= Graciela Bianchi =

Uruguayan lawyer, teacher and politician

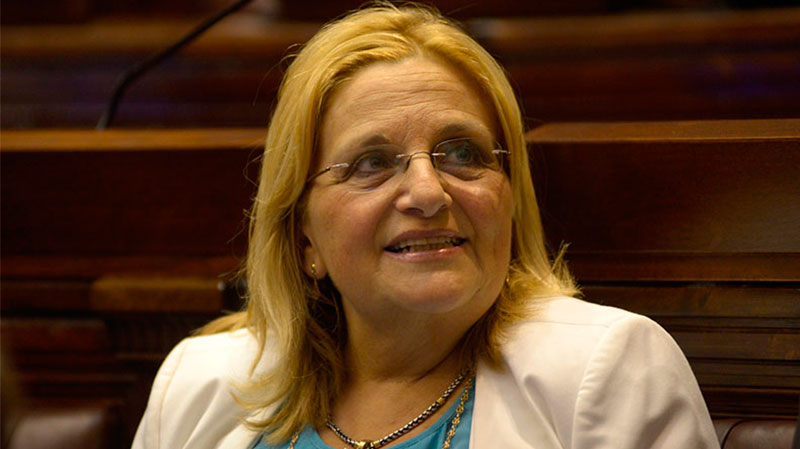

Senator of Uruguay
- Incumbent
- Assumed office 15 February 2020

Representative of Uruguay for Montevideo
- In office 15 February 2015 – 15 February 2020

Personal details
- Born: November 14, 1953 (age 72) Uruguay
- Party: Broad Front (1971–2014); National Party (2014 – present)
- Education: University of the Republic
- Occupation: Professor, politician, lawyer, notary

Graciela Elena Bianchi Poli (born 14 November 1953) is a Uruguayan lawyer, notary, teacher, and politician of the National Party. She served as Senator of Uruguay in the 49th Legislature. She is known for her interventions in constant confrontation with the opposition and for posting fake news on social media.

== Early life and education ==
Graciela Bianchi was born in Montevideo, to an Italian-Uruguay family. All four of her grandparents fled Fascist Italy and settled in Uruguay in 1925, originating from the Tuscany region. She was raised in a working-class household; her father worked at a bank and her mother was a homemaker. Her maternal grandfather, who lost his Italian citizenship upon acquiring Uruguayan nationality, was an active member of the Communist Party of Uruguay.

She studied history teaching at the Instituto de Profesores Artigas, and later pursued notary studies and law at the University of the Republic. After 35 years in teaching, she is currently retired. She was a secondary education principal of the Liceo Francisco Bauzá for 18 years, secretary of Germán Araújo in the Senate, and secretary of the Central Directing Council (CODICEN). She worked until 2014 as a panelist on the daytime talk show Esta boca es mía aired on Teledoce.

== Political career ==
In 2013 she joined the National Party. In the 2014 primaries, she endorsed Luis Lacalle Pou for president, being elected Senator and Deputy for Montevideo. In January 2015, she announced that she would not assume her seat in the Senate, opting to take on deputies, in accordance with the provisions of Article 101 of the Constitution of the Republic.

In the 2019 general election, she was elected senator for the 49th Legislature. She assumed her seat on February 15, 2020, and since March of that year, she has been second in the presidential line of succession.

== Personal life ==
Bianchi is married and the mother of two children, the elder a notary and the younger an architect.
