= Carlos Camy =

Uruguayan politician

Senator of Uruguay
- Incumbent
- Assumed office 2005

Director of ANCAP
- In office 2010–2013

Personal details
- Born: Carlos Daniel Camy Antognazza; 9 September 1970 (age 55) San José de Mayo, Uruguay
- Party: National

Carlos Daniel Camy Antognazza (born 9 September 1970) is a Uruguayan politician of the National Party (PN).

== Education ==
He studied Business Administration in the School of Commerce and Law in the University of the Republic.

== Political career ==
He is a member of the National Alliance sector in the San José Department. He currently serves as Senator of the Republic, a position he has held since 2005. From 2010 to 2013 he was the director of ANCAP, later he formed the board of the National Corporation for Development.

In 2015, after the resignation of Senator Sergio Botana (who took office as Intendant of Cerro Largo), Camy assumes the Senate seat for the entire legislature. In March 2019, he is elected 2nd Vice President of the Senate.

Following the death of National Alliance leader Jorge Larrañaga, Camy took over as faction leader.
