= Carlos Iafigliola =

Uruguayan politician

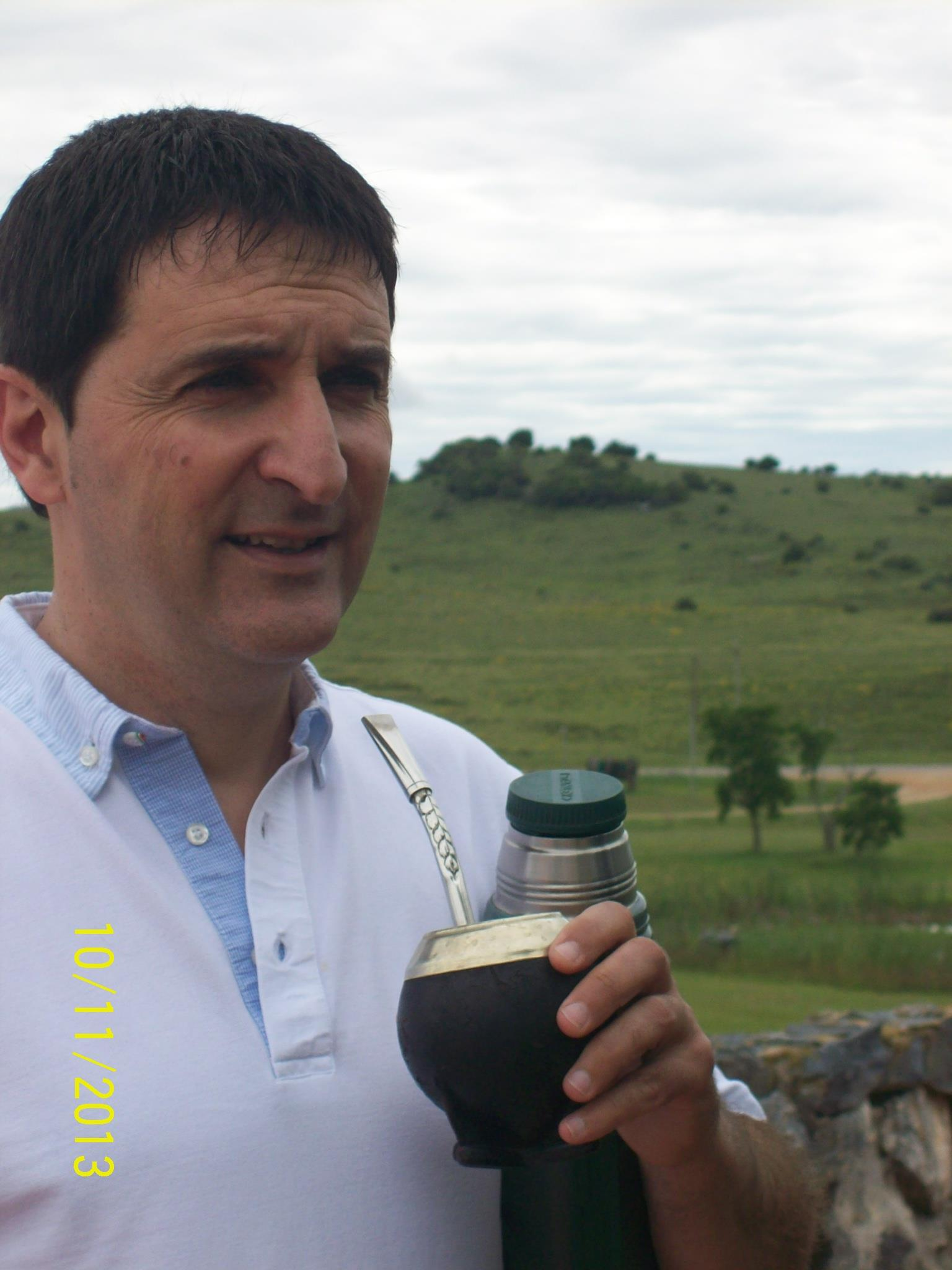
- Iafigliola in 2014

Personal details
- Born: Carlos Alberto Iafigliola Pimentel; 1 February 1963 (age 63) Montevideo, Uruguay
- Party: National
- Education: Catholic University of Uruguay

Carlos Alberto Iafigliola Pimentel (born 1 February 1963) is a Uruguayan politician and activist who served as a member of the Montevideo Legislature from 2005 to 2015, and as a deputy National Representative from 2015 to 2020. A member of the National Party (PN), he was a candidate in the 2024 presidential primaries for president of Uruguay in the 2024 general election.

== Early life and education ==
Iafigliola was born into a working-class family on 1 February 1963, in the Buceo neighbourhood of Montevideo. He studied engineering at the University of the Republic and was part of the university union as a member of a Christian student association. He ultimately did not graduate, instead he obtained a degree in marketing from the Catholic University of Uruguay.

== Political career ==
In 2003, he founded the Christian Social Current (List 252) as a sector of the National Party.
