= 2014 Uruguayan constitutional referendum =

26 October 2014
- Hold criminally responsible and punish according to provisions of the Penal Code those over 16 and under 18 years of age. Maintain records of those under 16 in conflict with criminal law

Results
Choice	Votes	%
Yes	1,110,283	46.81%
No	1,261,834	53.19%
Valid votes	2,372,117	100.00%
Invalid or blank votes	0	0.00%
Total votes	2,372,117	100.00%
Registered voters/turnout	2,620,235	90.53%

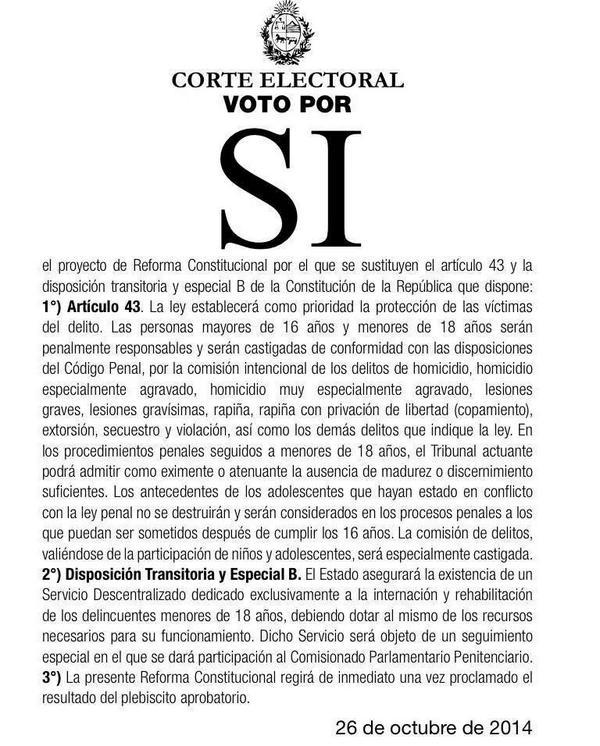
Ballot paper.

A constitutional referendum, officially referred to as the referendum to lower the age of criminal responsibility (Spanish: plebiscito para bajar la edad de imputabilidad), was held in Uruguay on 26 October 2014, alongside general elections. Voters were asked whether Article 43 of the Constitution should be amended to lower the age of criminal responsibility from 18 to 16. The proposal was rejected by 53% of voters.

== Background ==
During the electoral campaign for the 2009 elections, security was a significant issue, with criticism of the Broad Front government from the two main opposition parties, the National Party and the Colorado Party, regarding its handling of the issue. Towards the second half of 2010, several bills had been created that were aimed at modifying the legal framework that governs crimes committed by young people between 16 and 18 years of age, either by toughening the penalties, judging them as adults, or maintaining their legal record once they came of age.

On 17 April 2012, the signatures aimed at enabling a plebiscite were delivered to the Electoral Court, which were verified on 6 September, exceeding the 250,000 (10% of those authorized to vote) necessary to hold the vote.

== Results ==
Choice	Votes	%
For	1,110,283	46.81
Against	1,261,834	53.19
Total	2,372,117	100
Registered voters/turnout	2,620,235	90.53
Source: Corte Electoral
