= Liceo Ildefonso Pablo Estévez =

Location
- 363 Doctor Ivo Ferreira St. Tacuarembó, Tacuarembó Department; Uruguay
- Coordinates: 31.7146°S 55.9869°W

Information
- Other name: Liceo No. 1 de Tacuarembó
- Type: Public secondary
- Established: 1912
- Gender: Coeducational

Liceo Ildefonso Pablo Estévez is a public secondary school in Tacuarembó, Uruguay. Officially designated Liceo No. 1 of Tacuarembó, it provides upper secondary education, serving students in the first through third years of Educación Media Superior, corresponding to the final three years of secondary education (grades 10 to 12).

== History ==
The Liceo N.º 1 de Tacuarembó was established under the Law on the Creation of Departmental Lyceums enacted on 5 January 1912, during the administration of President José Batlle y Ordóñez, which provided for the establishment of secondary schools in the capitals of Uruguay’s departments as part of a broader policy aimed at decentralizing secondary education in the country. The institution began its academic activities on 8 April 1912 in a building located at the intersection of 18 de Julio and General Artigas streets, under the direction of Principal José Pol Santandreu.

In 1934, owing to a growing student population, the institution relocated to larger premises. Further increases in enrollment led to the inauguration of its current building in 1956. In 1989, the school was formally granted the name Ildefonso P. Estévez by law.

== Notable alumni ==
- Tomás de Mattos – writer
- Eduardo Larbanois – musician
- Richard Mascarañas – cyclist
- Renzo Pozzi – footballer
- Robert Silva – politician
