= Amin Niffouri =

Uruguayan politician (born 1971)

Amin Niffouri Blanco (born 1971 in Las Piedras, Uruguay) is a Uruguayan politician from the National Party.

== Biography ==
Born to a family of Syrian descent, Niffouri was elected town councillor for Canelones Department in 2005. As a member of Luis Lacalle Pou's TODOS faction, he was elected to Parliament in 2009. Niffouri was re-elected for the following two terms. In 2020, following the resignation of Álvaro Delgado (who took over as Secretary to the Presidency) Niffouri held a seat in the Senate for the entire legislative term. In the 2024 election, he was once again elected to the House of Representatives.

In 2014–2015, faced with the arrival of Syrian immigrants fleeing the war, Niffouri volunteered his services, as did his sister.
