= 2014 Uruguayan general election =

- 26 October 2014; 30 November 2014 (runoff)
- Registered: 2,620,791
- Turnout: 90.51% (first round) ▲0.60pp 88.58% (second round) ▼0.60pp
- Presidential election
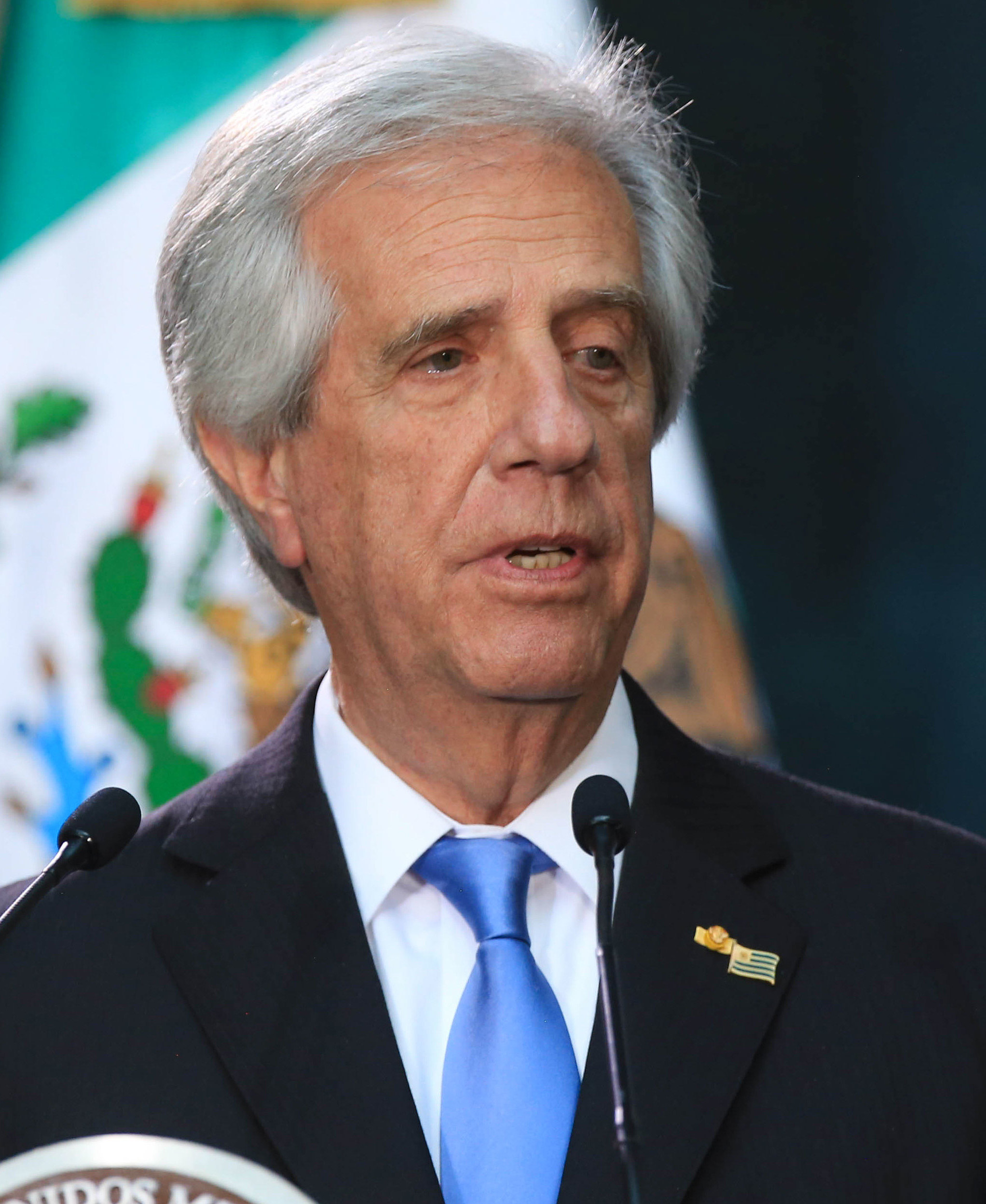

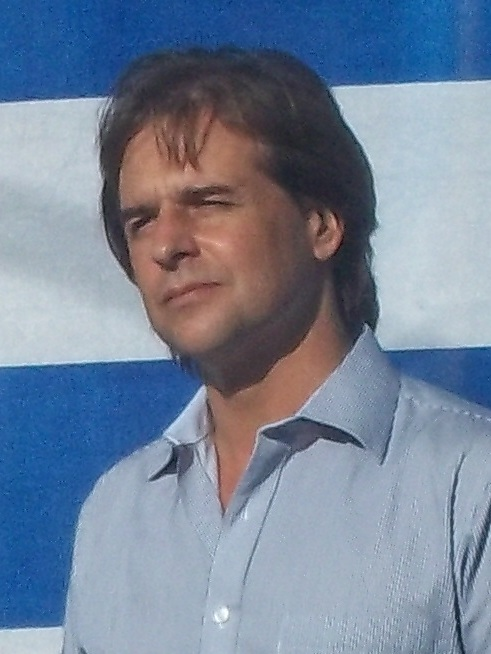
Nominee	Tabaré Vázquez	Luis Lacalle Pou
Party	Socialist	National
Alliance	Broad Front
Running mate	Raúl Sendic	Jorge Larrañaga
Popular vote	1,241,568	955,741
Percentage	56.50%	43.50%
President before election
José Mujica
Broad Front
Elected President
Tabaré Vázquez
Broad Front
- Parliamentary election
Party	Leader	Vote %	Seats	+/–
Chamber
Broad Front	Tabaré Vázquez	49.45	50	0
National	Luis Lacalle Pou	31.94	32	+2
Colorado	Pedro Bordaberry	13.33	13	−4
Independent	Pablo Mieres	3.20	3	+1
Popular Unity	Gonzalo Abella	1.17	1	+1
Senate
Broad Front	Tabaré Vázquez	49.45	15	−1
National	Luis Lacalle Pou	31.94	10	+1
Colorado	Pedro Bordaberry	13.33	4	−1
Independent	Pablo Mieres	3.20	1	+1
This lists parties that won seats. See the complete results below.
- Maps

General elections were held in Uruguay on 26 October 2014, alongside a constitutional referendum. As no presidential candidate received an absolute majority in the first round of voting, a runoff took place on 30 November. Primary elections to determine each party's presidential candidate had been held on 1 June.

Incumbent President José Mujica was ineligible to run owing to a constitutional limit on serving consecutive terms. The governing Broad Front nominated Mujica's predecessor, Tabaré Vázquez, as its candidate. Vázquez came within a few thousand votes of a first-round victory and advanced to the runoff with National Party candidate Luis Alberto Lacalle Pou, son of former president Luis Alberto Lacalle de Herrera. In the runoff, Vázquez was returned to office with the widest margin since the run-off system was first implemented in 1999. The Broad Front also maintained its majority in the Chamber of Deputies, winning 50 of the 99 seats.

== Electoral system ==
The president was elected using the two-round system, with a run-off required if no candidate received 50% of the vote in the first round. The 30 members of the Senate were elected by proportional representation in a single nationwide constituency. The 99 members of the Chamber of Representatives were elected by proportional representation in 19 multi-member constituencies based on the departments. Seats are allocated using the highest averages method.

The elections were held using the double simultaneous vote method, whereby voters cast a single vote for the party of their choice for the presidency, the Senate and the Chamber of Representatives.

== Candidates ==
Presidential primaries were held on 1 June to select the candidates. The following list shows the presidential candidates elected to take part in the October presidential elections.

Party	Candidate	Ideology	Previous result	
Party	Candidate	Ideology	Votes (%)	Seats
Broad Front	Tabaré Vázquez	Democratic socialism Social democracy	47.96%	50 / 99 16 / 30
National Party	Luis Lacalle Pou	Conservatism Christian democracy	29.07%	30 / 99 9 / 30
Colorado Party	Pedro Bordaberry	Liberalism	17.02%	17 / 99 5 / 30
Independent Party	Pablo Mieres	Christian humanism Christian democracy	2.49%	2 / 99 0 / 30
Popular Unity	Gonzalo Abella	Marxism	0.67%	0 / 99 0 / 30
Ecologist Radical Intransigent Party	César Vega	Green liberalism	Did not contest	
Workers' Party	Rafael Fernández	Trotskyism	Did not contest	

== Campaign ==
There were around 250,000 new voters in this election, many of them not used to traditional media. Campaign managers and advertising agents took notice of this new trend, and implemented an important portion of their campaign via social media.

== Opinion polls ==
Pollster	Date	Sample size	FA	PN	PC	PI	UP	None/unsure
Cifra	10–21 July 2013	1,021	43%	25%	14%	2%	–	16%
Mori	21 December 2013	–	44%	25%	14%	2%	–	11%
Cifra	19 February 2014	1,000	45%	28%	15%	–	–	–

== Results ==
Within the Broad Front coalition, the Movement of Popular Participation won six seats in the Senate, the Liber Seregni Front won three and the Socialist Party won two. Following the second round of the presidential elections, the Broad Front gained an extra seat in the Senate, giving them a majority, as Vice President Raúl Fernando Sendic Rodríguez automatically became a member.

Party	Presidential candidate	First round		Second round		Seats			
Party	Presidential candidate	Votes	%	Votes	%	Chamber	+/–	Senate	+/–
Broad Front	Tabaré Vázquez	1,134,187	49.45	1,241,568	56.50	50	0	15	–1
National Party	Luis Alberto Lacalle Pou	732,601	31.94	955,741	43.50	32	+2	10	+1
Colorado Party	Pedro Bordaberry	305,699	13.33			13	–4	4	–1
Independent Party	Pablo Mieres	73,379	3.20			3	+1	1	+1
Popular Unity	Gonzalo Abella	26,869	1.17			1	+1	0	0
Partido Ecologista Radical Intransigente	César Vega	17,835	0.78			0	New	0	New
Workers' Party	Rafael Fernández	3,218	0.14			0	New	0	New
Total		2,293,788	100.00	2,197,309	100.00	99	0	30	0
Valid votes		2,293,788	96.70	2,197,309	94.66				
Invalid/blank votes		78,329	3.30	124,066	5.34				
Total votes		2,372,117	100.00	2,321,375	100.00				
Registered voters/turnout		2,620,791	90.51	2,620,791	88.58				
Source: Corte Electoral

=== By department ===
First round
Constituency	Broad Front			National Party			Colorado Party			Independent Party			Popular Assembly			Others (Note: Parties which gained no parliamentary representation: PERI and Workers' Party.)		Valid votes		Invalid votes	
Constituency	Votes	%	D	Votes	%	D	Votes	%	D	Votes	%	D	Votes	%	D	Votes	%	Votes	%	Votes	%
Artigas	21,964	40.2	1	20,881	38.2	1	9,073	16.6	0	628	1.1	0	418	0.8	0	94	0.2	53,058	97.1	1,595	2.9
Canelones	176,187	51.0	8	99,090	28.7	4	37,669	10.9	2	10,827	3.1	0	4,133	1.2	0	4,282	1.2	332,188	96.1	13,597	3.9
Cerro Largo	29,191	44.8	1	25,002	38.3	1	7,722	11.8	0	884	1.4	0	443	0.7	0	79	0.1	63,321	97.1	1,894	2.9
Colonia	39,877	42.2	1	35,378	37.4	1	12,569	13.3	1	2,592	2.7	1	620	0.7	0	522	0.6	91,558	96.9	2,977	3.1
Durazno	16,614	36.9	1	19,979	44.4	1	5,627	12.5	0	1,016	2.3	0	432	1.0	0	44	0.1	43,712	97.0	1,331	3.0
Flores	6,903	33.5	1	9,658	46.9	1	2,902	14.1	0	362	1.8	0	133	0.6	0	22	0.1	19,980	97.0	611	3.0
Florida	20,991	39.7	1	19,877	37.6	1	8,159	15.4	0	1,575	3.0	0	536	1.0	0	96	0.2	51,234	96.9	1,629	3.1
Lavalleja	16,431	34.5	1	20,184	42.4	1	7,877	16.5	0	1,195	2.5	0	273	0.6	0	48	0.1	46,008	96.6	1,642	3.4
Maldonado	46,692	39.4	2	42,010	35.5	2	18,890	15.9	1	3,853	3.3	0	955	0.8	0	1,701	1.4	114,101	96.3	4,384	3.7
Montevideo	497,184	53.5	23	238,834	25.7	11	98,658	10.6	5	38,311	4.1	1	14,198	1.5	0	12,500	1.3	899,685	96.8	29,403	3.2
Paysandú	40,860	48.5	1	28,838	34.3	1	9,209	10.9	1	1,541	1.8	0	689	0.8	0	584	0.7	81,721	97.1	2,449	2.9
Rio Negro	17,434	43.1	1	13,848	34.2	1	6,574	16.2	0	809	2.0	0	286	0.7	0	48	0.1	38,999	96.3	1,493	3.7
Rivera	27,987	36.3	1	24,461	31.7	1	20,738	26.9	1	1,045	1.4	0	459	0.6	0	150	0.2	74,840	97.0	2,334	3.0
Rocha	23,403	42.5	1	19,001	34.5	1	7,958	14.4	0	1,460	2.6	0	829	1.5	0	87	0.2	52,738	95.7	2,390	4.3
Salto	45,409	50.0	2	19,659	21.7	0	20,614	22.7	1	2,113	2.3	1	412	0.5	0	81	0.1	88,288	97.3	2,445	2.7
San Jose	33,665	44.6	1	27,291	36.2	1	8,707	11.5	0	2,011	2.7	0	680	0.9	1	501	0.7	72,855	96.5	2,613	3.5
Soriano	30,117	45.8	1	22,184	33.7	1	9,073	13.8	0	1,413	2.1	0	579	0.9	0	122	0.2	63,488	96.5	2,278	3.5
Tacuarembó	27,949	39.5	1	28,836	40.7	1	10,180	14.4	1	1,219	1.7	0	496	0.7	0	60	0.1	68,740	97.1	2,039	2.9
Treinta y Tres	15,329	39.8	1	17,590	45.7	1	3,500	9.1	0	525	1.4	0	298	0.8	0	32	0.1	37,274	96.8	1,225	3.2
Total	1,134,187	47.81	50	732,601	30.88	32	305,699	12.89	13	73,379	3.09	3	26,869	1.13	1	21,053	0.89	2,293,788	96.70	78,329	3.30
Source: Corte Electoral

Second round
Constituency	Broad Front		National Party		Valid votes		Invalid votes	
Constituency	Votes	%	Votes	%	Votes	%	Votes	%
Artigas	25,999	49.3	25,030	47.5	51,029	96.7	1,717	3.3
Canelones	190,042	56.1	129,228	38.1	319,270	94.2	19,610	5.8
Cerro Largo	33,915	52.9	27,845	43.4	61,760	96.3	2,356	3.7
Colonia	44,649	48.2	43,711	47.1	88,360	95.3	4,358	4.7
Durazno	19,871	45.5	21,729	49.7	41,600	95.2	2,092	4.8
Flores	8,217	40.8	11,124	55.2	19,341	96.0	809	4.0
Florida	24,105	46.8	24,807	48.1	48,912	94.9	2,633	5.1
Lavalleja	19,110	41.2	24,794	53.5	43,904	94.8	2,430	5.2
Maldonado	52,679	45.4	56,611	48.8	109,290	94.2	6,690	5.8
Montevideo	524,966	57.6	331,454	36.4	856,420	94.0	54,414	6.0
Paysandú	44,720	54.4	33,875	41.2	78,595	95.7	3,554	4.3
Rio Negro	19,688	49.9	18,012	45.7	37,700	95.6	1,751	4.4
Rivera	35,782	47.7	35,850	47.7	71,632	95.4	3,452	4.6
Rocha	26,389	48.7	24,494	45.2	50,883	93.9	3,289	6.1
Salto	51,469	58.3	33,317	37.8	84,786	96.1	3,470	3.9
San Jose	37,450	50.8	32,686	44.3	70,136	95.1	3,623	4.9
Soriano	33,139	51.3	28,258	43.8	61,397	95.1	3,159	4.9
Tacuarembó	31,815	46.0	34,303	49.6	66,118	95.6	3,032	4.4
Treinta y Tres	17,563	46.5	18,613	49.2	36,176	95.7	1,627	4.3
Total	1,241,568	53.48	955,741	41.17	2,197,309	94.7	124,066	5.3
Source: Corte Electoral
