= Carmen Sanguinetti =

Uruguayan politician

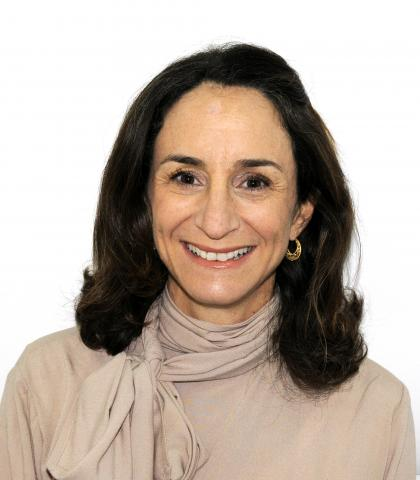
- Carmen Sanguinetti in 2020.

Senator of Uruguay
- In office 1 March 2020 – 15 February 2025

Personal details
- Born: Carmen Sanguinetti Masjuan; 1977 (age 48–49) Montevideo, Uruguay
- Party: Colorado Party
- Spouse: Alberto Brause
- Children: Trinidad, Benjamín, Isabel
- Education: Catholic University of Uruguay
- Occupation: Activist; Politician

Carmen Sanguinetti Masjuan (born 1977) is a Uruguayan politician of the Colorado Party (PC), who served as Senator of the Republic in the 49th Legislature.

== Education ==
Sanguinetti attended The British Schools of Montevideo. She graduated from the Catholic University of Uruguay, she has a bachelor's degree in Business Administration. After graduating, she moved to the United States, where he obtained a master's degree in Public Policy from the Northeastern University. She has served as Executive Director of the company Sistemas B Uruguay.

== Political career ==
For the 2019 presidential primaries, Sanguinetti joins Ciudadanos, a faction of the Colorado Party led by Ernesto Talvi.

She was the advisor on the issue of disability in the presidential campaign of Ernesto Talvi in 2019. In the general election of that year, she was elected first substitute of Senator Ernesto Talvi. When Talvi took office as Minister of Foreign Affairs, on March 1, 2020, Sanguinetti took the seat for the 49th Legislature. In addition, the post was ratified after Talvi's definitive resignation from politics.

== Private life ==
Carmen Sanguinetti is the niece of politician Jorge Sanguinetti, who is the cousin of former president Julio María Sanguinetti.

Her husband is Alberto Brause. The couple have three children: Trinidad, Benjamin and Isabel.
