= Jorge Silveira Zabala =

Uruguayan politician

Jorge Silveira Zavala (6 January 1930, Tacuarembó – 7 July 2005) was a Uruguayan politician.
