= Uruguayan presidential line of succession =

Order by which officers of the Uruguayan government fill the office of president

The Uruguayan presidential line of succession is the set order in which officials of the Uruguayan government assume the office of head of state if the incumbent President of Uruguay becomes incapacitated, dies in office, resigns, or is removed from office. The line of succession is set out in Article 153 of the Uruguayan Constitution and follows the order of the Vice President and the Senator of the list most voted for of the political party by which they were elected.

== Current order of succession ==
No.	Office	Incumbent	Party
	President	Yamandú Orsi	Broad Front
1	Vice President	Carolina Cosse	Broad Front
2	Senator	Blanca Rodriguez	Broad Front
3	Senator	Daniel Caggiani	Broad Front
4	Senator	Sebastián Sabini	Broad Front
5	Senator	Felipe Carballo	Broad Front

== Presidential successions ==
=== Cases of presidential succession due to permanent vacancy ===
The following were cases of actual presidential succession due to permanent vacancy of the title holder:

- On 28 February 1882 the president of Uruguay Francisco Vidal submitted after the General Assembly a letter with his resignation for health reasons, and it was accepted. Because the General Assembly established the election date for the new president on 1 March, until this was going to be done, the presidential succession system foresaw in article 77 of Uruguayan Constitution of 1830 was triggered, and for that day the President of the Senate Alberto Flangini was designated acting president. The next day the General Assembly elected as the new president Máximo Santos.

=== Temporary substitutions ===
The following were temporary substitutions where the title holder obtained permission to leave of absence and returning after this term ended, and between those dates an acting official took charge of the duties:

- During the second administration of Julio María Sanguinetti, Senator Luis Bernardo Pozzolo held the presidency temporarily for three days.
- During the administration of José Mujica, Senator Alberto Couriel held the presidency temporarily for one day, as did Senator Ernesto Agazzi.
- During the second administration of Tabaré Vázquez, in the first days of June 2018, Senator Patricia Ayala temporarily held the presidency.
