= Enrique Rodríguez Fabregat =

Uruguayan politician and diplomat

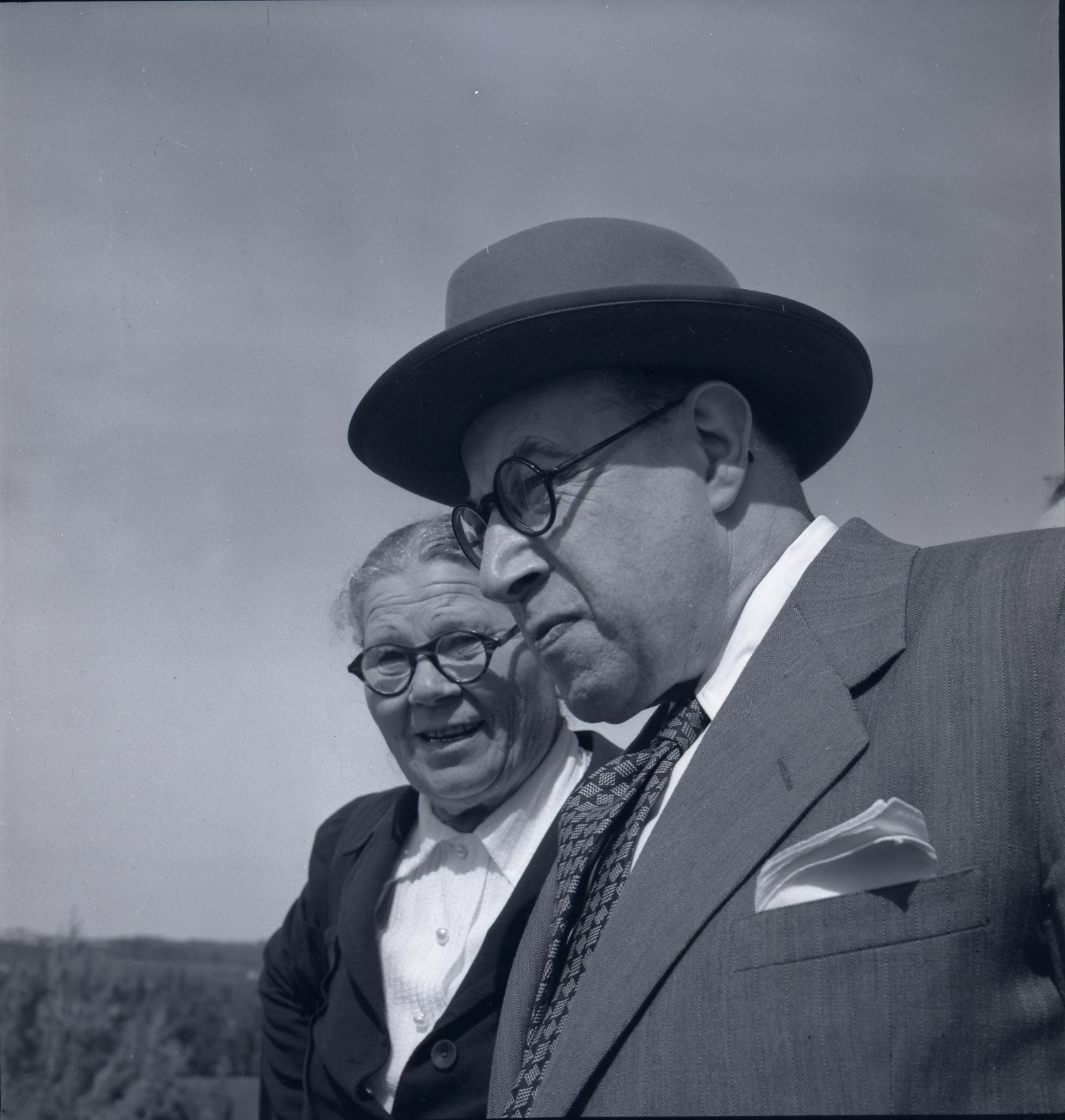
- Rodríguez Fabregat in 1947
- Born: Enrique Rodríguez Fabregat; 11 November 1895; San José de Mayo, Uruguay
- Died: 19 November 1976 (aged 81); Montevideo, Uruguay
- Occupations: Politician; journalist; diplomat
- Political party: Colorado (1913–1970); Broad Front (1971–1976)

Enrique Rodríguez Fabregat (11 November 1895 – 19 November 1976) was a Uruguayan politician and diplomat. He served as Minister of Public Instruction from 1927 to 1929, and later as Uruguay's delegate to the United Nations, taking part in its Special Committee on Palestine in 1947, where he played a prominent role in supporting the partition plan that led to the establishment of the State of Israel.

== Biography ==
Rodríguez Fabregat born on 11 November 1885 in San José de Mayo, the son of Enrique Rodríguez and María Fabregat. He obtained a diploma as a teacher of public instruction before beginning his career in education and public service.

A member of the Batllist faction of the Colorado Party, he was appointed Minister of Public Instruction in 1927 during the presidency of José Batlle y Ordóñez within the National Council of Administration. Following the establishment of Gabriel Terra’s dictatorship, he went into exile, living in several South American countries and teaching in Brazil, Ecuador, Bolivia, and the United States. During this period, he also collaborated with the Chilean writer Gabriela Mistral to draft the Decalogue of the Rights of the Child.

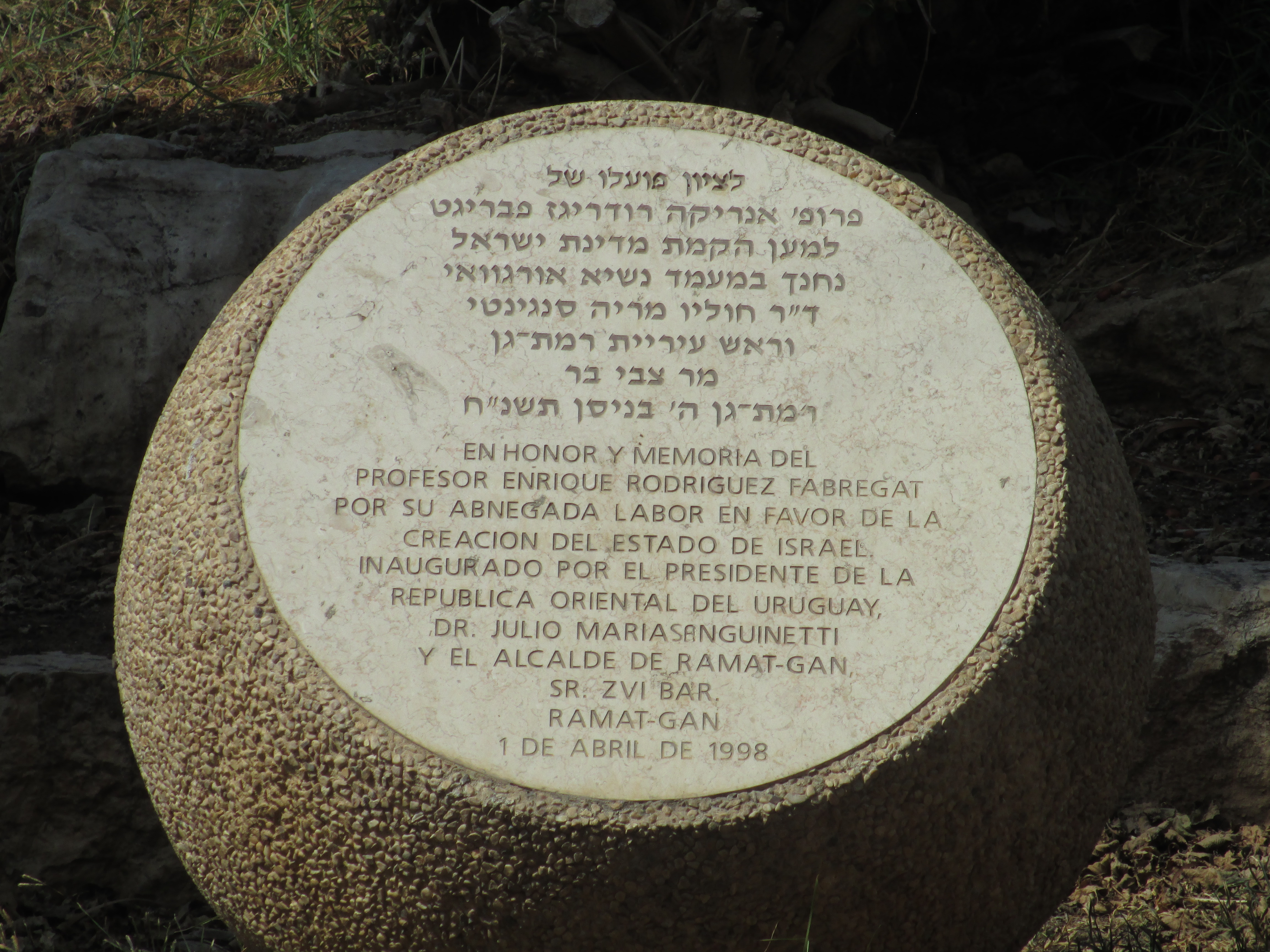
Commemorative plaque dedicated to Rodríguez Fabregat in Ramat Gan, Israel, inaugurated in 1998.

From 1946 to 1961, he served as Uruguay's ambassador to the United Nations. In this capacity, he was a member of the United Nations Special Committee on Palestine, which visited the region and proposed the Partition Plan. During the committee's deliberations, Fabregat highlighted the connection between the situation in the Land of Israel and the plight of Jewish refugees following World War II. On 29 November 1947, during the vote on the Partition Plan, he responded to a request from the representative of the Zionist delegation, Abba Eban, and, together with Guatemalan Ambassador Jorge García Granados, coordinated the other Latin American ambassadors into a crucial voting bloc in favor of the plan, without which it might not have passed.

In 1965, he endorsed Amílcar Vasconcellos in the internal elections of the electoral list Lista 15, who was defeated by Jorge Batlle. The following year, he supported the presidential ticket of Óscar Diego Gestido and Jorge Pacheco Areco in the general election. In 1970, he left the Colorado Party and joined a group of its members who went on to found the Broad Front.
