= Jay Batlle =

American painter

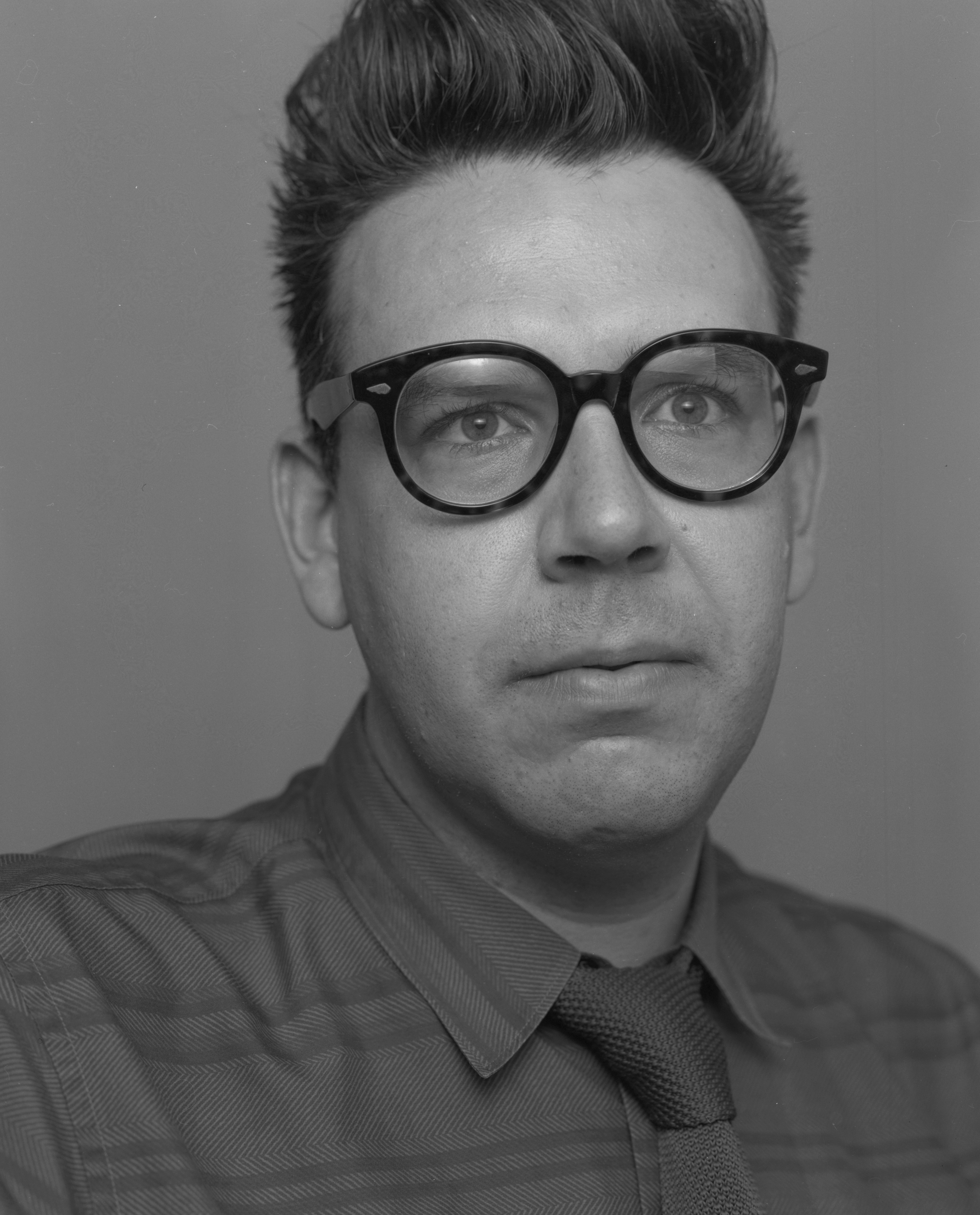
- Born: July 10, 1976 (age 50); Syracuse, New York

Jay Batlle (born 1976) is an American artist. Batlle received his Bachelor of Arts from UCLA in 1998. He went to the Ateliers in Amsterdam from 1998 to 2000. Batlle uses an epicurean style in paintings, drawings, and sculptures to produce social commentary about decadence and . His oeuvre offers both a critique of comestible-related decadence and a celebration of the preparation and consumption of food across various cultures.

Batlle's works often incorporate images and text from the food section of publications such as The New Yorker and The New York Times, stationery from restaurants in different parts of the world, and fragments of recipes, sketches, photographs, and other found objects. He also incorporates coffee grounds, wine, and other food stains.

Batlle’s work has been exhibited at galleries and museums including Metro Pictures, the Chelsea Museum, Exit Art, The Dorsky Gallery in New York City, the Ausstellungshalle Zeitgenössische Kunst in Münster, (Germany), the National Museum of Fine Arts, Santiago de Chile, and at the Museum of Liverpool, United Kingdom. He is represented by 1000eventi gallery in Milan, Italy and works with Nyehaus, in New York and Clages, in Cologne.
