= National Administration of Public Education =

- Administración Nacional de Educación Pública
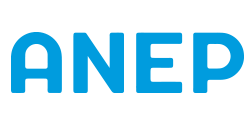
- Logo of the ANEP

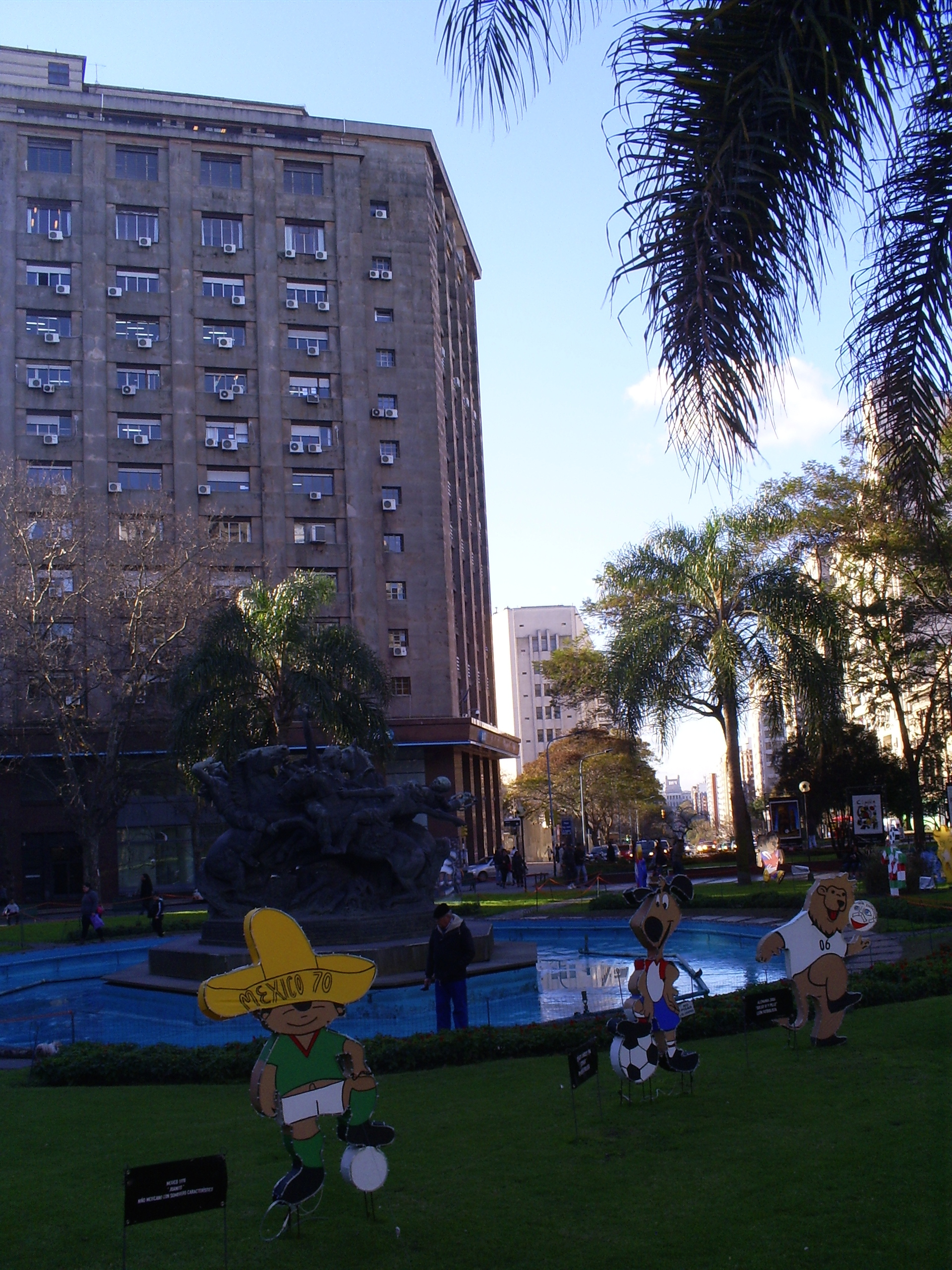
- Headquarters of ANEP

Agency overview
- Formed: March 28, 1985; 41 years ago
- Headquarters: 1409 Libertador Avenue; Montevideo, Uruguay
- Website: anep.edu.uy

The National Administration of Public Education (Spanish: Administración Nacional de Educación Pública) is the government agency responsible for the planning, management and administration of the public educational system in all its stages and also for teacher training in Uruguay.

The ANEP has its headquarters in the Agraciada Building, located on Libertador Avenue in front of Plaza Fabini in the central business district of Montevideo. Designed by architects Miguel Ángel Canale and Beltrán Arbeleche, and built in the 1950s, it served as the headquarters of the Uruguayan airline PLUNA.

== History ==
The ANEP was created on March 28, 1985, by President Julio María Sanguinetti with the promulgation of Law No. 15,739 –known as the Education Law–. It has the legal status of an autonomous entity, which grants autonomy from the Executive Branch to the organization of the public educational system. However, it is about technical and administrative autonomy, although not financial.

== Current organization ==
The ANEP is administered by the Consejo Directivo Central (Spanish for 'Central Directive Council'), a body of five members of which three are appointed by the President of the Republic acting in the Council of Ministers, and the other two are elected by the body's teaching staff. In addition, the administration has seven sectoral directorates and three secretariats.

The directorates that administer the different stages of the educational system depend on the Central Directive Cousil, designing the curriculum, supervising the development of classes, projecting salary budgets and supervising the authorized private institutes.

== Presidents ==
The chairman of the Central Directive Council is the one who serves as president of the National Public Administration.

No.	Name	Term of office		Appointed by	Ref.
No.	Name	Took office	Left office	Appointed by	Ref.
1	Juan Pivel Devoto	1985	1990	Julio María Sanguinetti	
2	J. A. Gabito Zóboli	1990	1995	Luis Alberto Lacalle	
3	Germán Rama	1995	2000	Julio María Sanguinetti	
4	Javier Bonilla	2000	2005	Jorge Batlle	
5	Luis Yarzábal	2005	2010	Tabaré Vázquez	
6	José Seoane	2010	2012	José Mujica	
7	Wilson Netto	2012	2020	José Mujica	
7	Wilson Netto	2012	2020	Tabaré Vázquez	
8	Robert Silva	2020	2023	Luis Lacalle Pou	
9	Virginia Cáceres	2023	Incumbent	Luis Lacalle Pou	
