= Partido Ecologista Radical Intransigente =

Intransigent Radical Ecologist Party Partido Ecologista Radical Intransigente
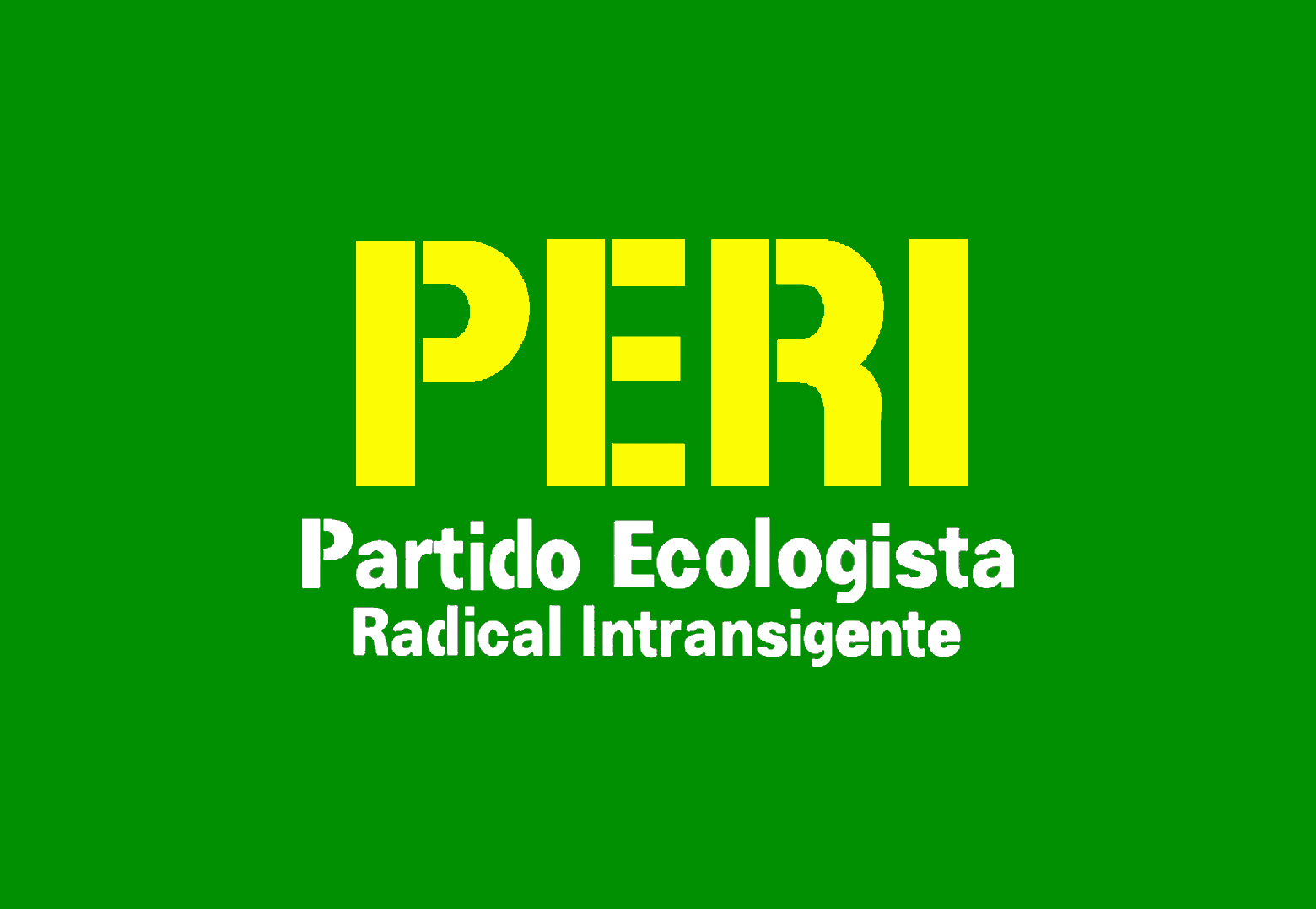
- President: César Vega
- Founder: César Vega
- Founded: July 2013
- Headquarters: Montevideo, Uruguay
- Ideology: Radicalism; Green liberalism Green politics Social liberalism
- Political position: Centre to centre-left
- Colors: Green, Yellow
- Chamber of Deputies: 0 / 99

Website
- www.peri.org.uy

The Intransigent Radical Ecologist Party (Spanish: Partido Ecologista Radical Intransigente, acronym PERI) is a Uruguayan green party established in 2013.

It participated in 2014 and 2019 primaries and general elections, obtaining in 2019 for the first time a seat in the Deputy chamber.

The party runs its own broadcasting programme on CX 40 Radio Fénix, La voz del agro.

== History ==
=== 2014 elections ===
PERI obtained 1,596 votes in the 2014 Uruguayan presidential primaries held on 1 June 2014, enough votes to gain the right to participate in the 2014 Uruguayan general election. One of its goals for October 2014 campaign was to install the environmental and ecological agenda in the Uruguayan Parliament.

After the final scrutiny of the October general elections by the Electoral Court of Uruguay, PERI obtained 17,835 votes. After one year since its creation, it almost reached a seat in the Deputy Chamber in 2014.

=== 2019 elections ===
After the final counts of the general election of October by the Electoral Court of Uruguay, PERI obtained 33,461 votes (with the total of circuits scrutinized), therefore Cesar Vega was elected as the sole deputy for PERI to the lower chamber.

== Election results ==
=== Presidential elections ===
Election	Party candidate	Running mate	Votes	%	Votes	%	Result
Election	Party candidate	Running mate	First Round		Second Round		Result
2014	César Vega		17,835	0.75%	–		Lost ✗
2019	César Vega	Andrés Chucarro	33,461	1.43%	–		Lost ✗
2019	César Vega	Sergio Billiris	9,281	0.40%	–		Lost ✗

=== Chamber of Deputies and Senate elections ===
Election	Votes	%	Chamber seats	+/-	Senate seats	+/-	Position	Size
2014	17,835	0.75%	0 / 99	New	0 / 99	New	Extra-parliamentary	6th
2019	33,461	1.43%	1 / 99	▲1	0 / 99	0	Opposition	▲5th
2024	9,281	0.40%	0 / 99	▼1	0 / 99	0	Extra-parliamentary	▼9th

== Gallery ==
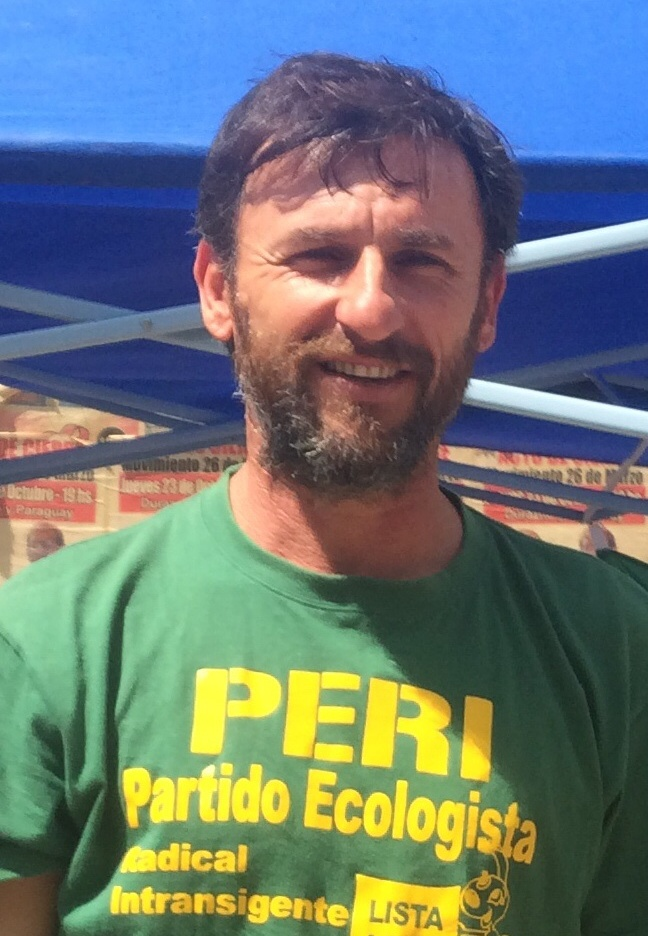
César Vega in 2014

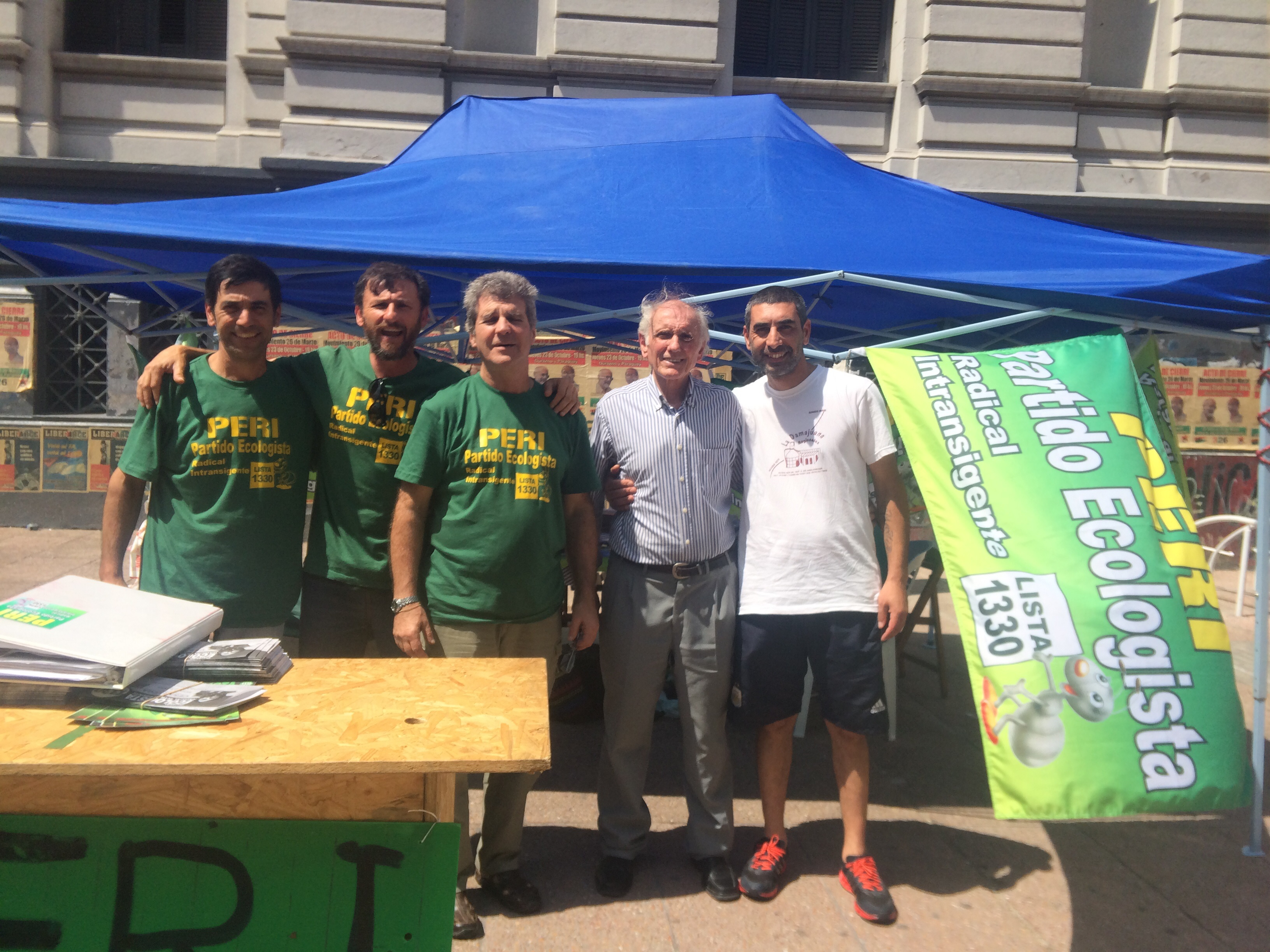
Richard Álvarez, César Vega, Sergio Billirís, Edén Aramburu and Martín Álvarez in 2014.
