= Robert Silva (politician) =

Uruguayan lawyer and politician (born 1972)

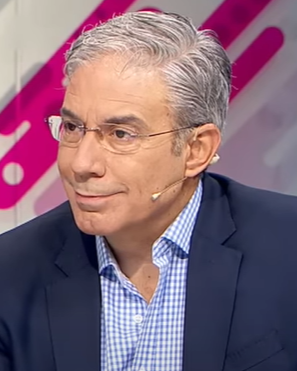
- Silva in 2023

Senator of the Republic
- Incumbent
- Assumed office 15 February 2025

President of the National Administration of Public Education
- In office 19 March 2020 – 26 October 2023
- President: Luis Alberto Lacalle Pou
- Preceded by: Wilson Netto
- Succeeded by: Virginia Cáceres

Personal details
- Born: Robert Silva García; 7 March 1971 (age 55) Tacuarembó, Uruguay
- Party: Colorado
- Children: Bruno; Joaquín; Agustina
- Education: University of the Republic
- Occupation: Lawyer; teacher; politician

Robert Silva García (born 7 March 1971) is a Uruguayan lawyer, teacher and politician, serving as Senator of the Republic since 2025. A member of the Colorado Party (PC), he served as president of the Central Directive Council of the National Administration of Public Education from 2020 to 2023 and was the Colorado nominee for vice president in the 2019 and 2024 general election.

== Early life and education ==
Silva García was born in Tacuarembó on March 7, the son of Neri Silva, a bar employee, and Martha García, a school teacher. He has a brother, Romín. He was raised in San Gregorio de Polanco where his mother taught in a rural school, living with his grandmother Eulalia Cuiliotti.

He attended the San Javier Jesuit Catholic School after winning a scholarship, and Liceo Ildefonso Pablo Estévez. In 1989 he moved to the capital Montevideo and enrolled at the University of the Republic, from which he obtained a law degree.

In 2001 he qualified as a professor of administration and services at the Instituto Normal de Enseñanza Técnica, an educational center that trains technical teachers for the University of Labor of Uruguay (UTU). A supporter of the Colorado Party, during his time at the university, Silva was one of the founders of Foro Universitario, a student union of Batllist ideology.

== Teaching career ==
Throughout his career as an educator, Silva has been part of different education governing bodies. From 1996 to 1999 he served as general secretary of the Council of Secondary Education, and from 1999 to 2005, as general secretary of the Central Directive Council (CODICEN) of the National Administration of Public Education (ANEP).

== Political career ==
=== 2019 vice-presidential campaign ===
After winning the primary election over former president Julio María Sanguinetti and senator José Amorín Batlle in the 2019 Colorado presidential primaries, economist Ernesto Talvi announced Silva as his running mate.

The announcement sparked controversy because Article 201 of the Constitution establishes that members of the boards of directors of autonomous entities and decentralized services who want to run for a parliamentary seat must leave their positions at least twelve months before the election. At the time of the announcement, three months before the general election, Silva served as a councilor of the Central Directive Council (CODICEN) of the National Administration of Public Education, an autonomous entity. Due to this issue, a consultation was carried out with the Electoral Court, so that it could interpret the Constitution and decide if the Vice President is a legislator more likely to be included in the restriction of Article 201.

At the end of July, the Electoral Court approved by six votes in nine the authorization of Silva to run for the vice presidency. In the October general election, the Talvi-Silva ticket came in third place with 12.80% of the vote.

=== 2024 presidential and vice-presidential campaigns ===
In mid-2023, speculation began that Silva could be a pre-candidate for President in the 2024 presidential primaries for the Ciudadanos sector of the Colorado Party. In September, Senator Adrián Peña, who was also speculated to be able to run in the Colorado primaries for the same sector, announced that he would not run. On September 15, the Open Batllismo sector led by Representative Ope Pasquet became the first to officially support Silva's candidacy.

On October 2, Representatives Felipe Schipani, María Eugenia Roselló and Sebastián Sanguinetti endorsed Silva for President. In addition, they publicly urged him to resign from his position in the National Administration of Public Education in order to run for the Senate and President. Days later, the entire Ciudadanos sector announced support for Silva's candidacy.

On October 26, Silva resigned from the position of President of the National Public Education Administration to carry out his campaign. He was succeeded by Colorado lawyer Virginia Cáceres Batalla, who became the first woman to hold the position. On November 7, 2023, Silva officially launched his candidacy, as part of the Crece platform, made up mainly of members of Ciudadanos and other sectors of the party.

In late November 2023, he was polling at about 30% in the Colorado primary opinion polls. In the Colorado Party primary election on June 30, 2024, Silva obtained 22.4% of the vote, placing second behind Andrés Ojeda who was elected the party's candidate for that year's general election. The following day, he was announced as Ojeda's running mate and vice presidential candidate.

In the general election, the Colorado ticket finished in third place with 16.07% of the vote. Silva was elected to the Senate for the 50th Legislature.
