= Andrés Lima (politician) =

Uruguayan politician

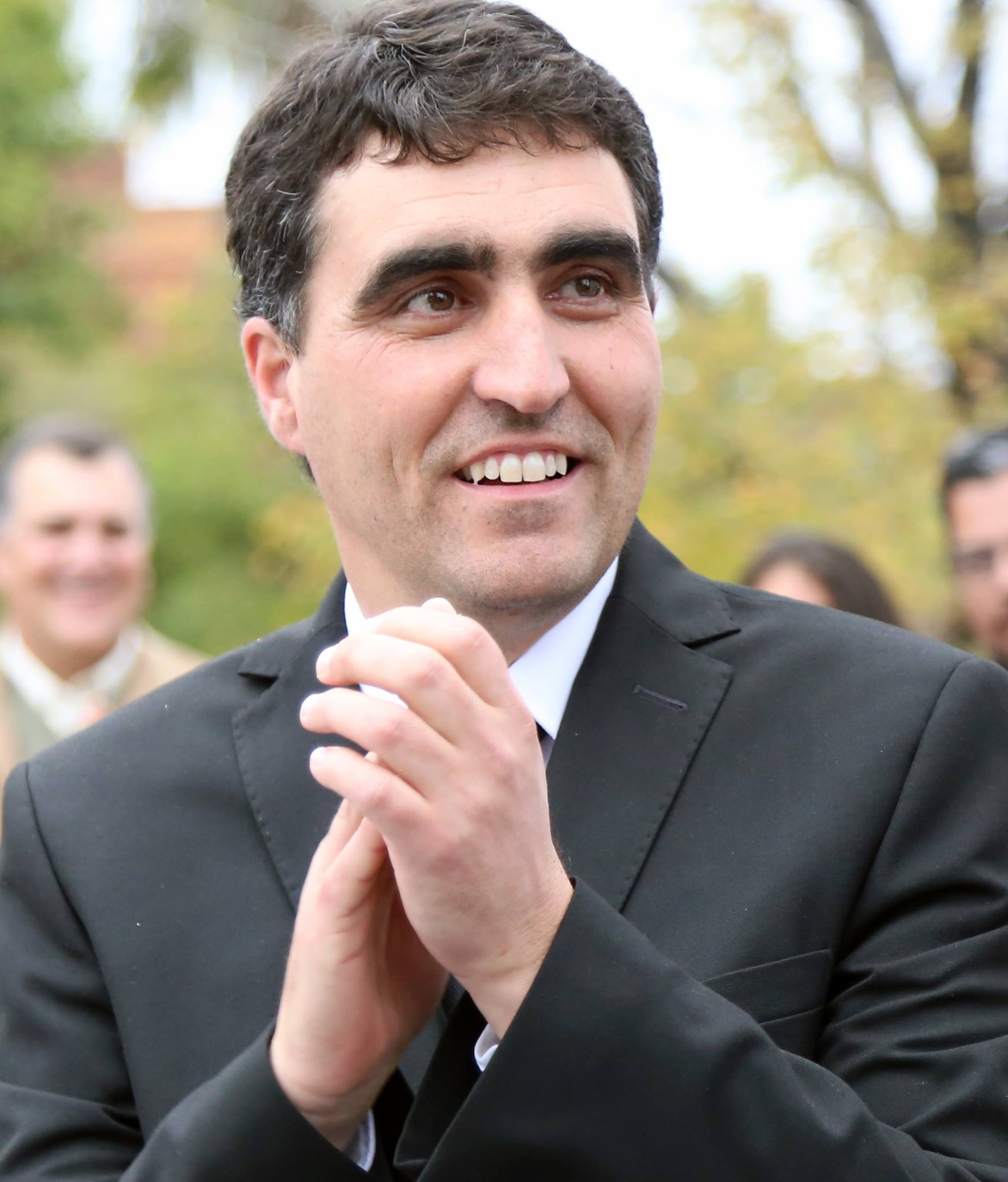

Intendant of the Salto Department
- Incumbent
- Assumed office 26 November 2020
- Preceded by: Alejandro Noboa
- In office 9 July 2015 – 8 February 2020
- Preceded by: Manuel Barreiro Maldonado
- Succeeded by: Alejandro Noboa

National Representative of Uruguay for Salto
- In office 15 February 2010 – 15 June 2015

Personal details
- Born: Andrés Pablo Lima Proserpio; 31 October 1973 (age 52) Salto, Uruguay
- Party: Broad Front
- Education: University of the Republic
- Occupation: Lawyer; politician

Andrés Pablo Lima Proserpio (born 31 October 1973) is a Uruguayan politician of the Broad Front, serving as Intendant of the Salto Department since 26 November 2020. He was born in Salto and graduated as a lawyer from the University of the Republic. Raised Catholic, in 2018 he joined the Evangelical Church, to which his then-partner belonged.
