= National Alliance (Uruguay) =

National Alliance Alianza Nacional
- Leader: Carlos Camy
- Ideology: Christian democracy
- Political position: Centre to centre-right
- National affiliation: National Party

The National Alliance ("Alianza Nacional") is a sector of the National Party (Uruguay).

== Leadership ==
The Alliance's first leader was its founder Jorge Larrañaga, who ran for President of Uruguay in 2004. Larrañaga was beaten by Tabaré Vázquez of the Broad Front. After Larrañaga's death 2021, Senator Carlos Camy was made the faction's new leader. The ideologies of the sector are centrism and christian democracy.

== Prominent members ==
Other prominent figures within the National Alliance sector include the following:

Sergio Abreu current senator and former minister of Industry; current senators Eber da Rosa, Carlos Moreira, Ana Lía Piñeyrúa, Verónica Alonso, Jorge Gandini, Pablo Abdala, Pablo Iturralde; as well as governors Bertil Bentos, Guillermo Besozzi, Sergio Botana, Omar Lafluf, Adriana Peña, Dardo Sánchez, Wilson Ezquerra, and Walter Zimmer; and former Senator Ruperto Long and others.

== 2004 primaries ==
Primary elections were held in 2004. The Alianza Nacional took the first positions inside the party.

== See also ==
- Politics of Uruguay
