= University of Montevideo =

- Universidad de Montevideo
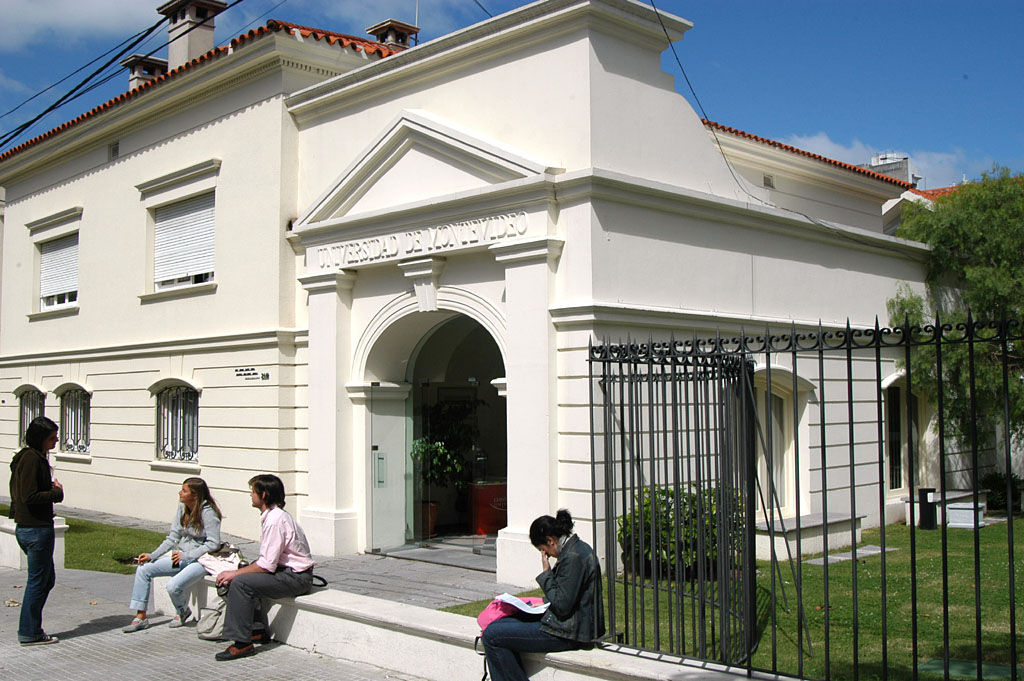
- Type: Private University
- Established: 1986
- Rector: Juan Manuel Gutierrez Carrau
- Location: Montevideo, Uruguay
- Website: www.um.edu.uy
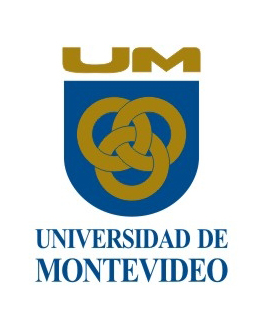

The University of Montevideo (Spanish: Universidad de Montevideo; UM) is a private (catholic, Opus Dei) university in Montevideo, Uruguay. It opened in 1986, and obtained the right to be legally named a university in 1997. It has been ranked as the number one University in Uruguay by the QS World University Rankings four years in a row. As of 2019, the UM reached the TOP 500 in the general rankings according to the international organization.

== Schools, Faculties & Centers ==
The UM has seven schools:

- School of Management Science and Economics (Undergraduate and Graduate programs)
- School of Law (Undergraduate and Graduate programs)
- School of Communication (Undergraduate and Graduate programs)
- School of Humanities (Undergraduate and Graduate programs)
- School of Engineering (Undergraduate and Graduate programs)
- IEEM (Business school - graduate programs only)
- Center of Biomedical Sciences (Only Graduate programs)

Centers:

- CINOI: Innovation Center in Industrial Organization
- CEDEI: Center for Latin American Research & Documentation
- Initium: Center of Leadership, Entrepreneurship and Innovation
- Applied Economics Research Center
- UM Library

== International Office ==
The UM International Office is responsible for developing a coherent corporate strategy to promote Universidad de Montevideo's international relations, global profile, and international competitiveness. It complements the academic mission of the University by providing the services and programs necessary to facilitate international education. The UM holds academic agreements with more than 140 institutions worldwide that enable student mobility and research projects.

== Academic programs ==
- B.A. in Accounting
- B.A. in Business Administration
- B.A. in Economics
- B.A. in Finance
- B.A. in International Business
- B.A. in Communications
- B.A. in Law
- B.A. in Humanities
- B.A. in History
- B.A. in Philosophy
- B.A. in Literature
- B.A. in Mathematics
- B.A. in English Language & Literature
- Degree in Civil Engineering
- Degree in Industrial Engineering
- Degree in Telematics Engineering
- Degree in Information Technology
- Public Notary Degree
- Teacher Education Programs
