= César Vega (agronomist) =

Uruguayan agronomist, communicator, and politician (born 1962)

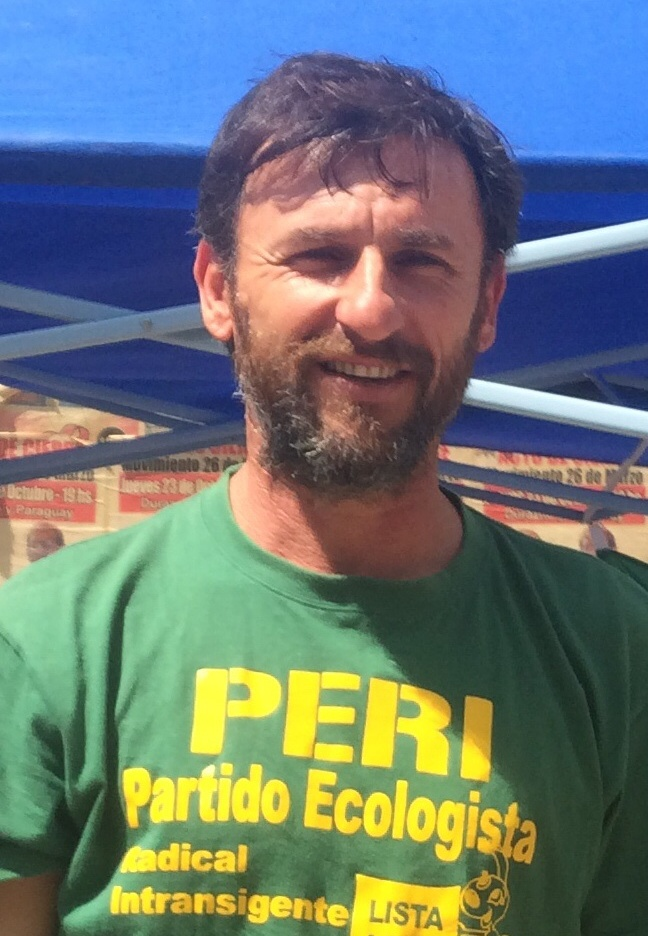
- César Vega in 2014.

Representative of Uruguay from Montevideo
- In office 15 February 2020 – 15 February 2025

Personal details
- Born: César Vega; 30 October 1962 (age 63) Paysandú, Uruguay
- Party: Partido Ecologista Radical Intransigente
- Education: University of the Republic
- Occupation: agronomist, communicator, politician

César Vega (born 1962) is a Uruguayan agronomist, communicator, and politician.

He graduated as agronomist in 1987 at the Faculty of Agronomy of the University of the Republic. Its announcer radio program called «La voz delagro» in Radio Fénix 1330AM, promotes responsible consumption of fruits and vegetables.

He is a candidate for the presidential election Uruguay and parliamentary representation by the Partido Ecologista Radical Intransigente (PERI), founded in 2013. The program has an emphasis on the preservation of natural resources and are against strip mines.

In the 2019 general election, he ran for president but lost however, he was elected national representative for Montevideo, a position he took on 25 February 2020.
