= 2014 Uruguayan presidential primaries =

Presidential primary elections were held in Uruguay on 1 June 2014 in order to nominate the presidential candidate for every political party taking part in the 2014 Uruguayan general election.

== Background ==
The formally called elecciones internas (Spanish for 'Internal elections') are the first stage of the electoral system established by the Constitution of 1997. In this election, the only candidates for President of Uruguay per party for the general election will be elected. In addition, the integration of the National Deliberative Body and the different Departmental Deliberative Bodies of the different parties, which have the function of nominating the candidate for president and vice president of each party, and the candidates for mayors for the municipal elections of 2015 are also elected.

In accordance with the transitory provisions of the Constitution, the primary elections are held on the last Sunday of June of the electoral year, and those "qualified to vote"—all those over 18 years of age and registered in the Civic Registry and with a civic credential―can participate in the secret and non-compulsory suffrage.

In order to win the primary election and be proclaimed a presidential candidate, the pre-candidate must obtain an absolute majority of the party's valid votes. In the event that no pre-candidate obtains that majority, the winner will be the one that exceeds 40% of the votes and leads the second by no less than 10 percentage points. If none of these circumstances occur, the deliberative body elected in the election will nominate the party's candidate for president by an absolute majority of its members.

The participation of the parties in the elections is mandatory. In addition, each one had to obtain at least 500 votes to participate in the general elections.

== Overview ==
According to the opinion polls, the political landscape remained stable, due to the fact that most serious candidates had already run on the previous election. In the ruling coalition Broad Front, former president Tabare Vazquez who had left office in 2010 with approval ratings above 60%, was challenged by senator Constanza Moreira. The major surprise was the rise of representative Luis Alberto Lacalle Pou from the conservative faction of the National Party, and his narrow victory over the more liberal former presidential candidate and senator Jorge Larrañaga:

- Broad Front: this party has a long tradition of single candidacies since 1971, with just a few exceptions. Finally, in November 2013, the Congress of the Broad Front announced two candidacies:
  - former President Tabaré Vázquez (winner)
  - senator Constanza Moreira
- National Party: the primary election within the National Party was a close contest, garnering most of the attention:
  - representative Luis Alberto Lacalle Pou, son of former president Luis Alberto Lacalle Herrera (winner)
  - senator Jorge Larrañaga
  - Álvaro Germano
  - Alfredo Oliú
- Colorado Party:
  - senator Pedro Bordaberry (winner)
  - senator José Amorín Batlle
  - former senator Manuel Flores Silva
- Independent Party:
  - former representative Pablo Mieres

Smaller parties

Many other smaller parties, most of them newly created, also took part in the elections and put forward presidential condidates:

- Popular Unity: Gonzalo Abella
- Unión para el Cambio: Marcelo Fuentes
- Partido de la Concertación: José Luis Vega
- Workers' Party: Rafael Fernández
- Partido Ecologista Radical Intransigente: César Vega
- Unidos por Nuestras Riquezas Naturales: Beatriz Banchero
