= Jorge Larrañaga =

Uruguayan politician and lawyer (1956–2021)

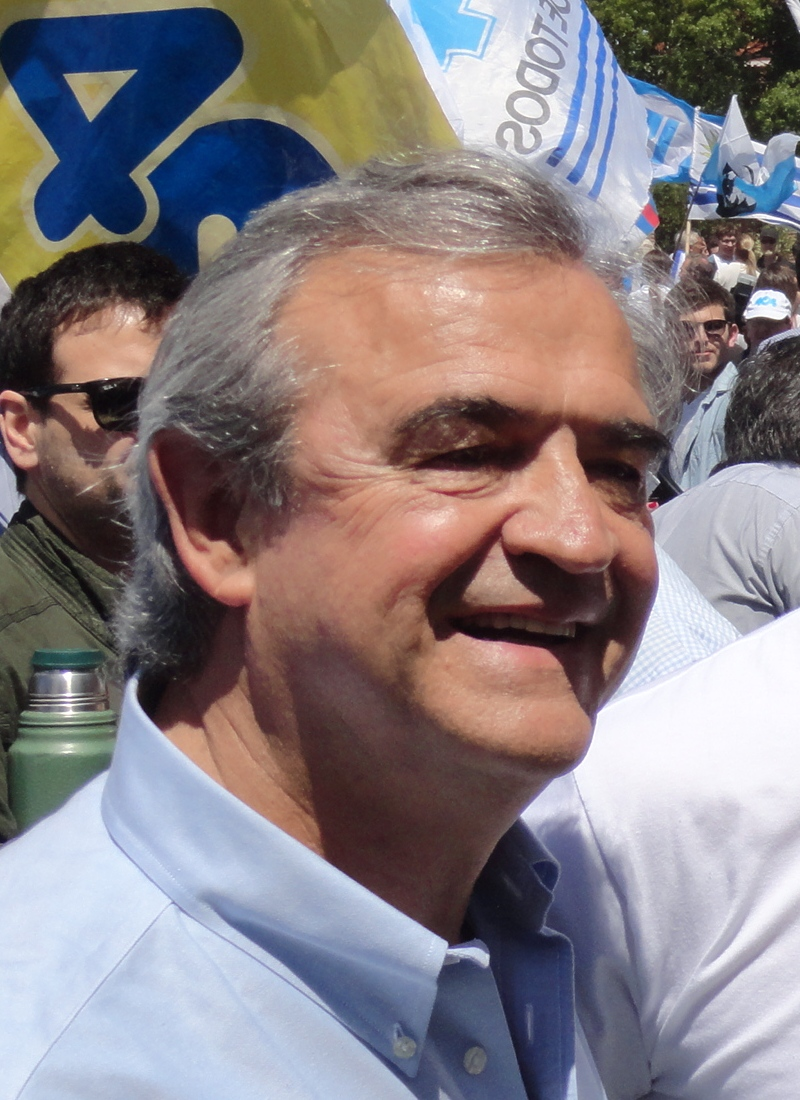
- Jorge Larrañaga in 2019

Minister of the Interior
- In office 1 March 2020 – 22 May 2021
- President: Luis Alberto Lacalle Pou
- Preceded by: Eduardo Bonomi
- Succeeded by: Luis Alberto Héber

Senator of Uruguay
- In office 15 February 2000 – 15 February 2020

Personal details
- Born: 8 August 1956 Montevideo, Uruguay
- Died: 22 May 2021 (aged 64)
- Party: National Party; Alianza Nacional
- Spouse(s): Ana María Vidal Elhordoy (-2005); María Liliana Echenique
- Children: Jorge Washington, Aparicio, Juan Francisco, Faustino
- Education: Universidad de la República
- Occupation: Politician, lawyer
- Website: Jorge Larrañaga

Jorge Washington Larrañaga Fraga (8 August 1956 – 22 May 2021) was a Uruguayan lawyer and politician of the National Party (PN) who served as Minister of the Interior from 1 March 2020 until his death. He previously served as Intendant of Paysandú from 1990 to 1999, as well as a Senator between 2000 and 2020.

== Early life and education ==
Larrañaga was born on August 8, 1956 in Paysandú, the son of Jorge Washington Larrañaga Ilarraz (1921–2003) and Ketty Fraga Coubrough (1923–2010). He was of Basque, Scottish and English descent.

He obtained a law degree from the University of the Republic and specialized in civil and labor law.

== Political career ==
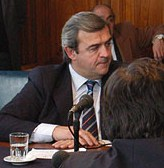
Larrañaga, Uruguayan senator.

From 1982 to 1984 he served as secretary of the Paysandú Departmental Commission of the National Party, and later from 1985 to 1989 as its vice president. In parallel, he served as a member of the department's legislature.

In the 1990 election he was elected Intendant of the Paysandú Department to serve a five-year term. In 1995 he was reelected to office. In the 1999 general election he was elected Senator of the Republic for the National Alliance sector. From the Senate he was critical of the administration of President Jorge Batlle and positioned himself against the agreements made between the National and Colorado parties.

In the 2004 presidential primaries, Larrañaga ran for president of Uruguay, and was elected the party's candidate. He announced Sergio Abreu as his running mate and in the October general election he obtained 35.13% of the vote, finishing second behind Tabaré Vázquez, candidate of the Broad Front who was elected president.

In August 2004 Larrañaga became president of the National Party, being a strong opponent of the Tabaré Vázquez government. He served in the position until September 2008, when he was succeeded by Carlos Julio Pereyra. Weeks later he announced that he would run for president again in the 2009 presidential primaries, in which he finished second to Luis Alberto Lacalle. However, Larrañaga was proclaimed as his running mate and vice presidential candidate for the general election. During the campaign he focused on capturing the vote of the political center. In October of that year, the Lacalle-Larrañaga formula obtained 29.07% of the vote and in the second round, 45.37%, which was not enough to beat José Mujica, who was elected president with 54.63%.

In January 2012 he resigned from his seat on the National Party board. In the 2014 presidential primaries he came in second place behind Luis Lacalle Pou, who offered him the vice presidential candidacy. Despite not being elected as a presidential candidate, Larrañaga was reelected Senator of the Republic for the 48th Legislature.

Since 2016 it was rumored that he would run again in the presidential primaries in 2019. In June 2017 he announced his pre-candidacy for President of Uruguay. In May 2018 he launched the signature collection campaign to promote constitutional reform. The project sought to implement measures regarding public security due to the increase in crime rates during the Broad Front governments. The proposed amendments to the Constitution would create a national guard, forbid early release for some serious crimes, introduce life sentences for crimes of rape, sexual abuse or homicide of minors as well as aggravated homicide of adults, and allow the police to conduct night raids.

In the 2019 presidential primaries he finished in third place within his party. In the October general election he was re-elected Senator, but was announced as Minister of the Interior by the elected president Luis Lacalle Pou. He took office on March 1, 2020.

== Death ==
On 22 May 2021, Larrañaga suddenly died of a heart attack. He was mourned by the government and several political figures of all ideologies.
