= General Assembly of Uruguay =

Bicameral legislature of Uruguay

General Assembly of Uruguay Asamblea General
- 50th Legislature of the Chamber of Senators; 50th Legislature of the Chamber of Deputies

Type
- Type: Bicameral
- Houses: Chamber of Senators; Chamber of Deputies

History
- Founded: October 25, 1828

Leadership
- President of the General Assembly & Senate: Carolina Cosse, Broad Front since March 1, 2025
- President of the Chamber of Representatives: Rodrigo Goñi Reyes, National Party since March 1, 2026

Structure
- Seats: 129 members 99 deputies 30 senators
- Senate political groups: Government (16): Broad Front (16); Opposition (14): National Party (9); Colorado Party (5)
- Chamber of Representatives political groups: Government (48): Broad Front (48); Opposition (51): Republican Coalition (49); National Party (29); Colorado Party (17); Open Cabildo (2); Independent Party (1); Sovereign Identity (2)

Elections
- Senate voting system: Ley de lemas
- Chamber of Representatives voting system: Ley de lemas with Localized list
- Last Senate election: 27 October 2024
- Last Chamber of Representatives election: 27 October 2024

Meeting place
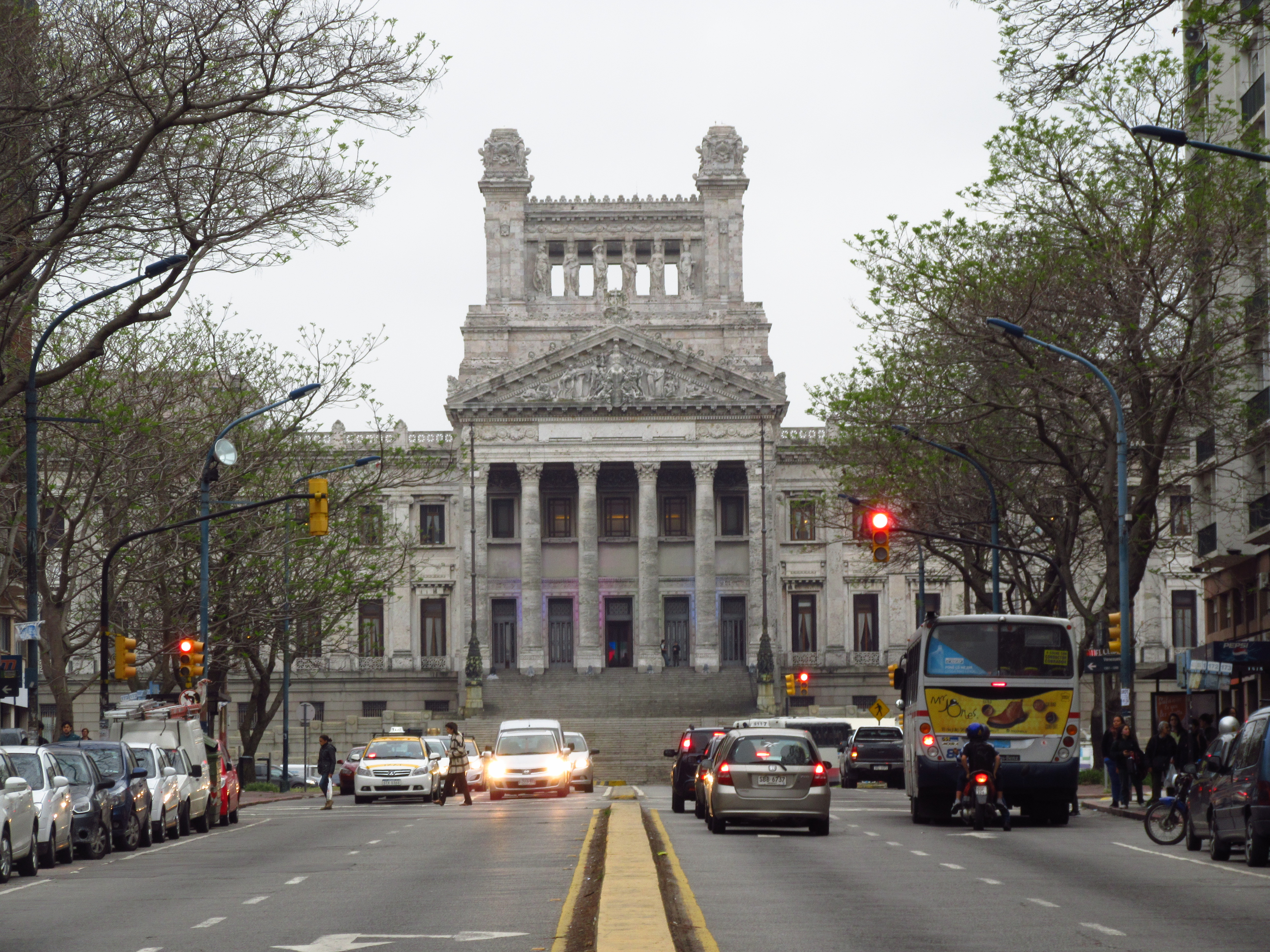
- Legislative Palace, Montevideo

Website
- www.parlamento.gub.uy

The General Assembly of Uruguay (Spanish: Asamblea General de Uruguay) is the bicameral legislature of the government of Uruguay, and consists of two chambers: the Chamber of Senators and the Chamber of Representatives. General Assembly has 130 voting members: 99 representatives and 30 senators, the Vice President of the Republic, who serves as President of the General Assembly, and the Senate has the right to vote. The legislature meets in the Legislative Palace in Montevideo. Both senators and representatives are chosen through proportional representation for five-year terms.

The General Assembly holds its sessions in the Chamber of Representatives of the Legislative Palace. During the 19th century, the legislature met in the Montevideo Cabildo.

== History ==
In 1828, on the initiative of Juan Antonio Lavalleja, delegates were elected to what was to be the Parliament of the Eastern Province of Río de la Plata. As a consequence of the Treaty of Montevideo, such institution became the General Constituent and Legislative Assembly of the State, and had among other tasks the drafting of the country's first Constitution.

The Assembly was unicameral. But with the establishment of the Constitution in 1830, the Uruguayan Parliament became bicameral, and has remained so to this day. The voting system of its members also changed: during the 19th century, voting was reserved for a minority, and senators represented departments. Later, the secret and universal vote was established, and the representativeness of the senators, who are elected at the national level, was reformulated.

== Attributes ==
The ordinary sessions span every year from March 1 to December 15, or until September 15 in fifth year when elections are held, since the new Assembly must begin its sessions on February 15 of the following year.

Article Ninety of the Uruguayan Constitution requires that members of the Chamber of Representatives must be aged at least 25 and have been a citizen of Uruguay for five years. While Article Ninety-eight requires that the members of the Senate must be at least 30 years old and have been Uruguayan citizens for seven years.

The General Assembly is entitled to impeach the president or other government officials, to declare war and to approve or reject peace treaties, alliances, commerce, and conventions or contracts of any nature that the Executive enters into with foreign powers and designate every year the necessary armed force, as well as allowing foreign troops to enter the country. Denying or granting the departure of national forces outside the nation is also among the functions of the Assembly. The creation of new Departments, the setting of their limits, as well as the establishment of customs and export and import duties concern the legislative power, in addition to other functions established in Article Eighty-Five of the Constitution.

== Latest elections ==
As a result of the high number of small parties not meeting the electoral threshold to obtain representation in the Senate, the Broad Front won 16 of the 30 seats despite not achieving a majority of the valid votes. On the other hand, no coalition secured a majority in the Chamber of Representatives. The blank and invalid votes represented almost 5% and more than 100,000 votes, a record high.

Party	Presidential candidate	First round		Second round		Seats			
Party	Presidential candidate	Votes	%	Votes	%	Chamber	+/–	Senate	+/–
Broad Front	Yamandú Orsi	1,071,826	46.12	1,212,833	52.00	48	+6	16	+3
National Party	Álvaro Delgado	655,426	28.20	1,119,537	48.00	29	–1	9	–1
Colorado Party	Andrés Ojeda	392,592	16.89			17	+4	5	+1
Sovereign Identity	Gustavo Salle	65,796	2.83			2	New	0	New
Open Cabildo	Guido Manini Ríos	60,549	2.61			2	–9	0	–3
Independent Party	Pablo Mieres	41,618	1.79			1	0	0	0
Environmental Constitutional Party	Eduardo Lust	11,865	0.51			0	New	0	New
Popular Assembly	Gonzalo Martínez	10,102	0.43			0	New	0	New
Partido Ecologista Radical Intransigente	César Vega	9,281	0.40			0	–1	0	0
For Necessary Changes	Guillermo Franchi	3,183	0.14			0	New	0	New
Republican Advance Party	Martín Pérez Banchero	1,909	0.08			0	New	0	New
Total		2,324,147	100.00	2,332,370	100.00	99	0	30	0
Valid votes		2,324,147	95.11	2,332,370	95.72				
Invalid votes		52,750	2.16	64,654	2.65				
Blank votes		66,739	2.73	39,542	1.62				
Total votes		2,443,636	100.00	2,436,566	100.00				
Registered voters/turnout		2,727,120	89.61	2,727,120	89.35				
Source: Corte Electoral (First Round) Corte Electoral (Second Round) El Observador (Chamber and Senate)

== Library of the Legislative Power ==
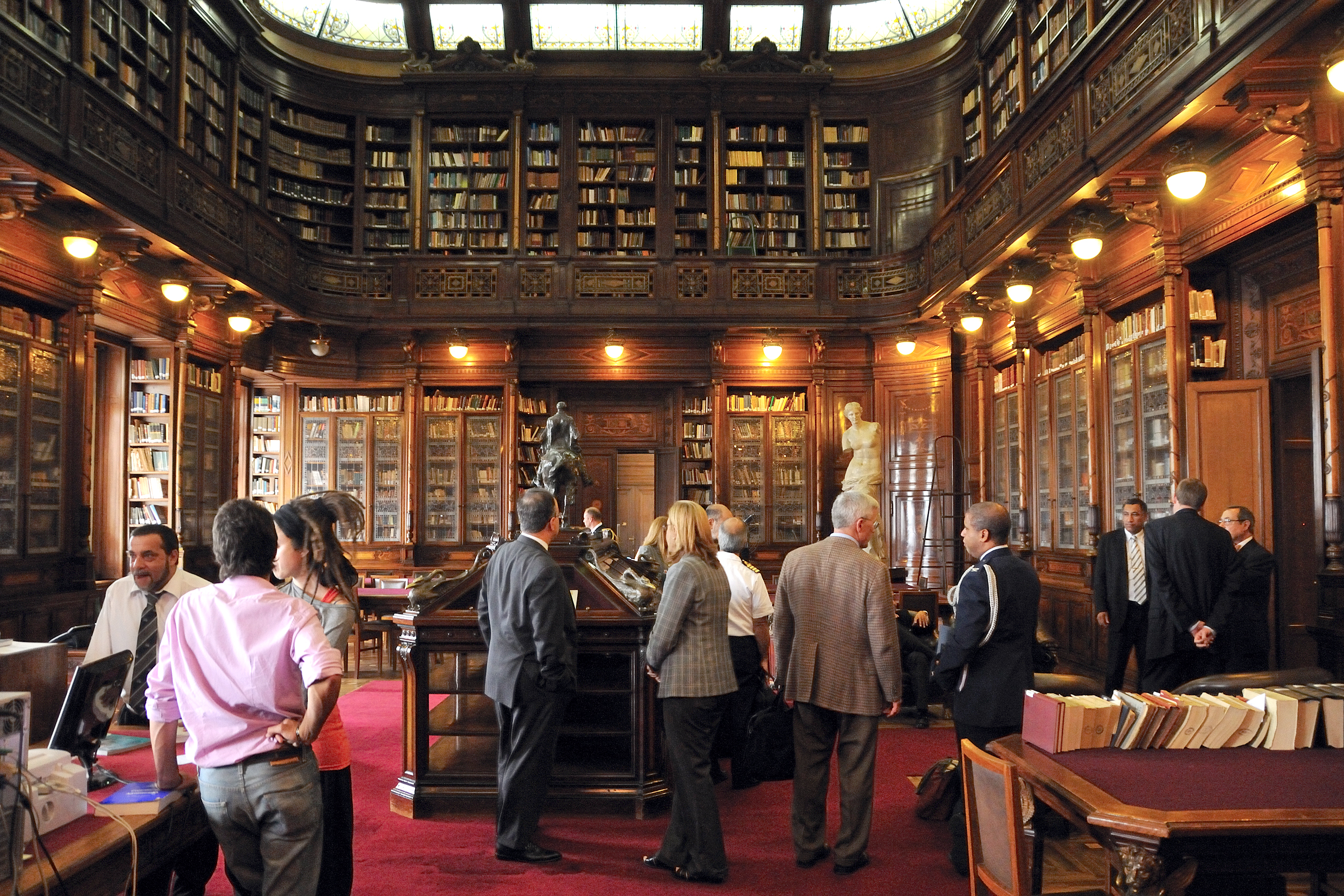
Library of the Legislative Power.

The Library of the Legislative Power of Uruguay is a specialized institution whose main objective is to assist Uruguayan legislators and the cultural development of the community in the fulfillment of its functions, in order to provide documentation, information and advice to citizens, thanks to extensive bibliographic, jurisprudential, doctrinal and legislative collection. It is considered the second most important library in Uruguay, behind the National Library, due to the large collection and the status of parliamentary and public library. The current library was founded on August 25, 1929, and has its origin in the unification of the libraries of the Chamber of Representatives and the Chamber of Senators.

== Gallery ==
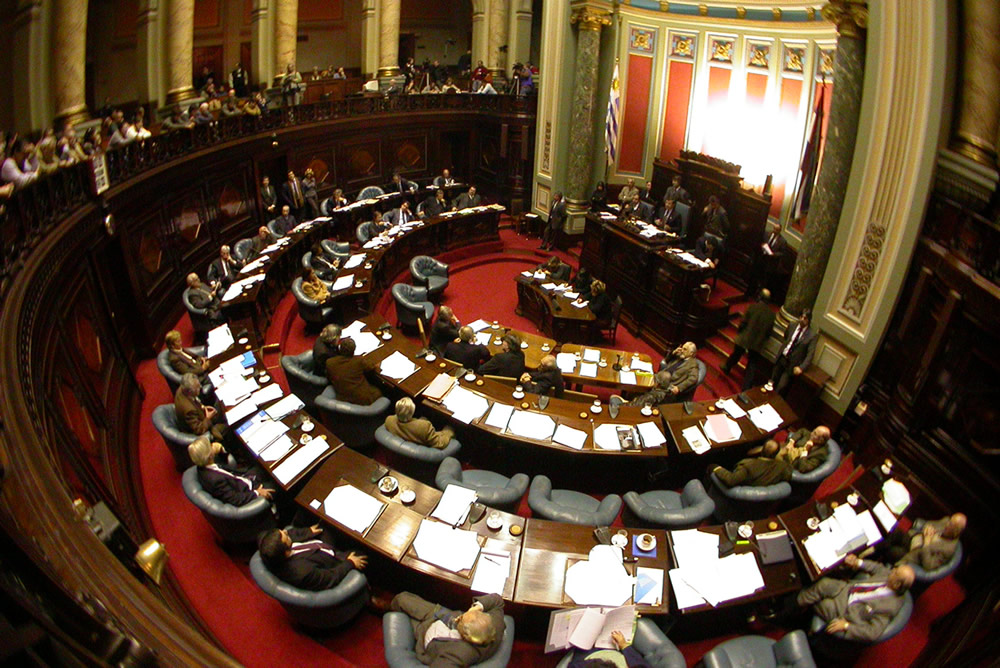
Hemicycle of the Senate

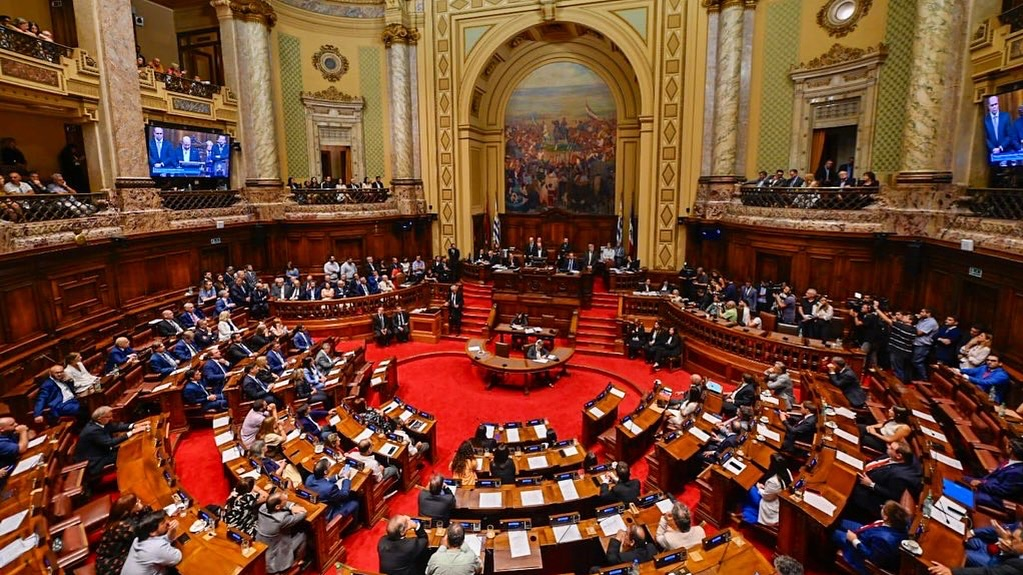
Hemicycle of the Chamber of Representatives

== See also ==
- Chamber of Deputies of Uruguay
- Senate of Uruguay
- Politics of Uruguay
- List of legislatures by country
