= Valeria Ripoll =

Uruguayan civil servant, trade unionist and television personality (born 1982)

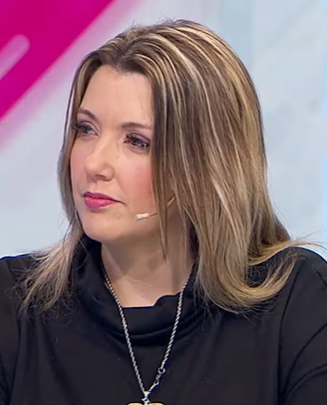
- Ripoll in 2022

General Secretary of ADEOM
- In office September 2017 – 13 September 2023
- Preceded by: Facundo Cladera
- Succeeded by: Silvia Tejera

Personal details
- Born: Shirley Valeria Ripoll Fraga; 13 October 1982 (age 43) Montevideo, Uruguay
- Party: National Party (2023–present)
- Other political affiliations: Communist Party of Uruguay (2010–2017)
- Children: 3

Shirley Valeria Ripoll Fraga (born 13 October 1982) is a Uruguayan trade unionist, civil servant, television personality and politician of the National Party. She was the party's nominee for vice president in the 2024 general election as Álvaro Delgado Ceretta's running mate.

== Early life and career ==
Ripoll was born on 13 October 1982 in Montevideo, to Shirley Fraga, an ANCAP official, and Néstor Ripoll, a non-commissioned officer of the National Navy. The eldest daughter in a Catholic family, she has a younger sister, Joana. Raised in the Brazo Oriental neighborhood of Montevideo, she attended the Colegio Sagrado Corazón of the Brothers of the Sacred Heart.

In her teens, to help with expenses at home, she studied piano and music theory, and worked as a music teacher in a kindergarten. She also served as a manager at a McDonald's restaurant and as a clerk at the National Navy headquarters, where she rose to the rank of seaman. After graduating from high school she enrolled at the University of the Republic to study psychology, but she did not finish her degree. She later studied to become an accounting administrative assistant.

In 2007 she signed up for a call for tenders from the Intendancy of Montevideo and got a position at the Municipal Planetarium. During this time she joined the Asociación de Empleados y Obreros Municipales (ADEOM), the workers' union of the municipality of Montevideo. Ripoll also worked as an official at the Botanical Garden and at the Montevideo Philharmonic Orchestra for a number of years.

While working as a civil servant, she held different union positions. From 2015 to 2017 she was a member of the union's culture secretariat and hosted its radio program. In September 2017 she took office as general secretary of ADEOM, which exponentially increased her public exposure. In this position she was critical of the Broad Front administrations of Montevideo headed by Daniel Martínez and Carolina Cosse. In the 2019 union elections, her group received the most votes, obtaining a majority in the union executive.

In the 2021 union elections, her group once again had the most votes. In 2023 she announced her departure from union activity. Until July 2024, when she had already entered party politics, she presided over the National Federation of Municipal Employees and was a member of the executive secretariat of the Plenario Intersindical de Trabajadores – Convención Nacional de Trabajadores trade union centre.

== Political career ==
Despite coming from a right-wing family, in 2010 while beginning union activity, she joined the Communist Party of Uruguay at the invitation of one of her union colleagues. However, in 2017 she disaffiliated and left the party due to disagreement with the party's lenient position regarding the administration of Daniel Martínez as Intendant of Montevideo, of which she was critical. She has stated that she was asked to be less harsh in her criticism because Martínez was going to be the Broad Front presidential candidate in 2019. In addition, she has reported that after refusing to do so and leaving the party, she suffered vandalism at her residence, until she needed police custody.

In mid-August 2023, she announced her departure from union activity and her entry into party politics, as a member of the centre-right National Party. She endorsed Álvaro Delgado Ceretta for president and began working as an advisor under commission in Martín Lema's seat—occupied by his first substitute—in the Chamber of Representatives. In February 2024 she announced that she was joining D Centro, a centrist sector of the National Party, along with leaders such as Vice President Beatriz Argimón and Vice Minister of the Interior Pablo Abdala. In the 2024 presidential primaries she was a leader of the Lista 5 electoral list, which supported the candidacy of Delgado Ceretta.

Following Álvaro Delgado Ceretta's landslide victory in the National Party primary on June 30, Ripoll was announced as his running mate and vice presidential candidate for the general election. The decision caused great surprise and made headlines in most newspapers the following day, due to her past as a member of the Communist Party and a trade unionist, and because she had only been in the National Party for almost a year. Among the reasons given by Delgado's team for the selection of Ripoll is to attract more centrist or centre-left voters who do not intend to vote for a Broad Front "more shifted to the left".

== Filmography ==
Year	Title	Role	Notes
2021–2024; 2025–present	Esta boca es mía	Herself	Panelist
2022	¿Quién es la máscara?	Herself	Contestant; 12th Eliminated

== Personal life ==
Ripoll has three children, two girls and a boy. As the latter was diagnosed with autism, she has become involved in activism, promoting the Fundación Abrazo Azul, a non-profit autism awareness organization.
