= Yamandú Orsi =

President of Uruguay since 2025

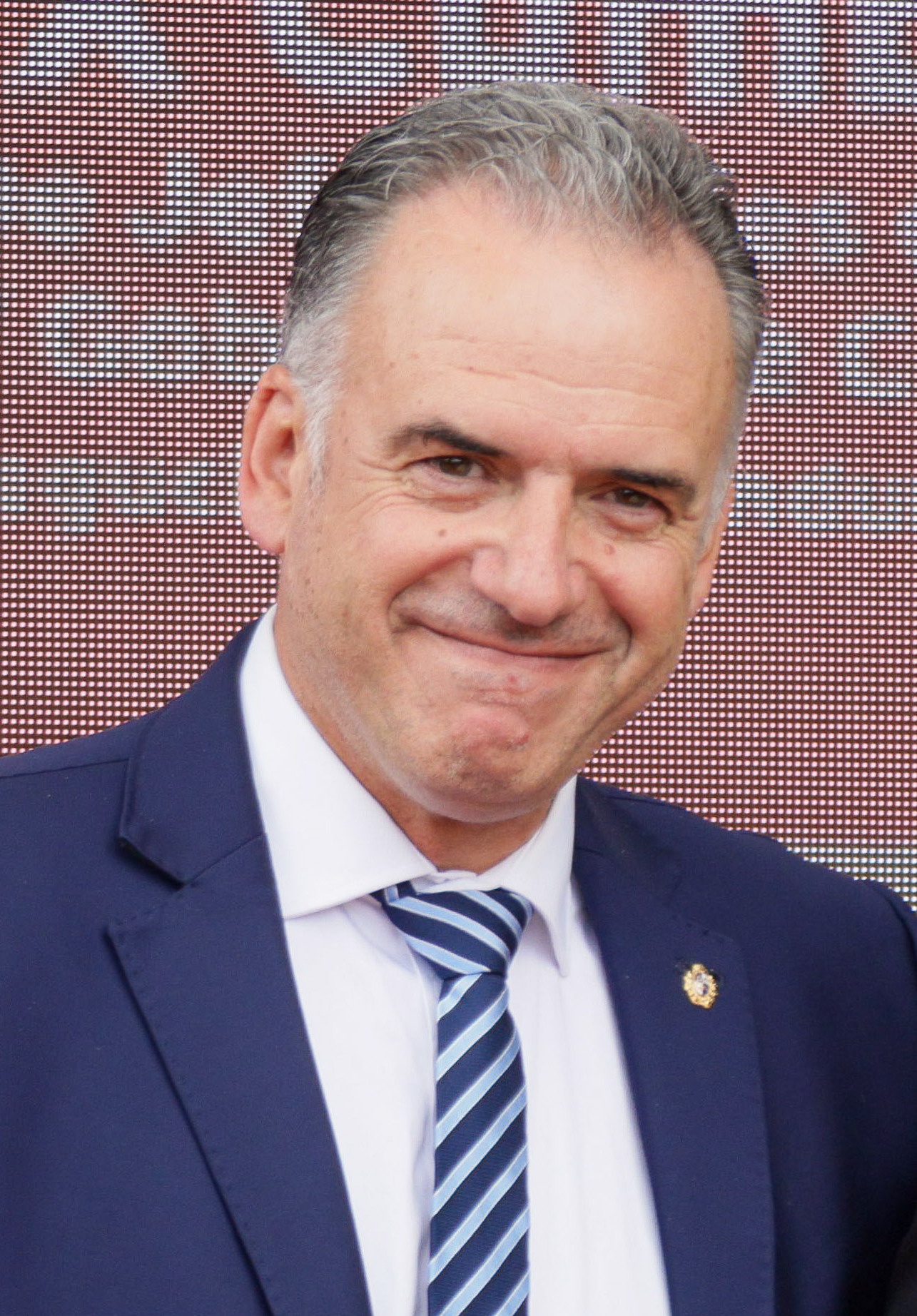
- Orsi in 2025

43rd President of Uruguay
- Incumbent
- Assumed office 1 March 2025
- Vice President: Carolina Cosse
- Preceded by: Luis Lacalle Pou

President pro tempore of Mercosur
- Incumbent
- Assumed office 1 July 2026
- Preceded by: Santiago Peña

President pro tempore of the Community of Latin American and Caribbean States
- Incumbent
- Assumed office 21 March 2026
- Preceded by: Gustavo Petro

Intendant of Canelones
- In office 26 November 2020 – 1 March 2024
- Preceded by: Tabaré Costa
- Succeeded by: Marcelo Metediera
- In office 9 July 2015 – 6 February 2020
- Preceded by: Gabriela Garrido
- Succeeded by: Tabaré Costa

Personal details
- Born: Yamandú Ramón Antonio Orsi Martínez; 13 June 1967 (age 59) Canelones Department, Uruguay
- Party: Broad Front (since 1990)
- Other political affiliations: Vertiente Artiguista (until 1990); Movement of Popular Participation (since 1990)
- Spouse: Laura Alonsopérez
- Children: 2
- Education: Instituto de Profesores Artigas
- Occupation: Politician; teacher (formerly)

Yamandú Ramón Antonio Orsi Martínez (Note: Latin American Spanish pronunciation: [ɟʝamanˈdu raˈmon anˈtonjo ˈoɾsi maɾˈtines], Yamandú locally [ʒamanˈdu, ʃamanˈdu -]) (born 13 June 1967) is a Uruguayan politician and history teacher who has been the 43rd president of Uruguay since March 2025. A member of the left-wing Movement of Popular Participation, the main faction of the Broad Front party, he served as intendant of the Canelones Department from 2015 to February 2020, and a second term from November 2020 to 2024.

A graduate from the Artigas Institute for Teacher Education in 1991 as a history teacher, he worked in different secondary schools in the Canelones, Florida, and Maldonado departments. He became politically active during his adolescence, being part of the Vertiente Artiguista until 1990, when he joined the Movement of Popular Participation (MPP) that had been founded the previous year.

== Early life and education ==
Yamandú Ramón Antonio Orsi Martínez was born in rural Canelones Department on 13 June 1967, to Pablo "Bebe" Orsi, a rural worker, and Carmen "Beba" Martínez, a seamstress. He has an older sister, María Orsi, Sra. del Luján.

Orsi is of paternal Italian descent, tracing his heritage to Osiglia, a municipality situated in the province of Savona, in the Liguria region of Italy. Orsi claims that the first of his paternal ancestors immigrated to Uruguay at the beginning of the 19th century. Following his presidential election victory, Paola Scarzella, the current mayor of Osiglia, congratulated Orsi and expressed her pride upon learning of his ancestral ties. Italian news outlets revealed that Orsi is the great-grandson of Giovanni Orsi, a native of Osiglia who immigrated to Uruguay. On his maternal side, he is of Spanish descent whose ancestors were one of the first settlers in Montevideo from the Canary Islands.

Raised in a rural area between the towns of Santa Rosa and San Antonio, the family struggled financially during Orsi's adolescence years and, for a time, lived in a house without electricity. At the age of five, he moved to the city of Canelones due to his father's spine disease, which prevented him from working in the fields. The family set up a grocery store there, where Orsi began his primary studies at Primary School No. 110 and his secondary studies at the Liceo Tomás Berreta.

Coming from a Roman Catholic family, Orsi was an altar boy for the neighborhood chapel. In his adolescence, he practiced folk dance, and at the age of fifteen, he won a contest to be part of a municipal cast, which he integrated until he was 26. In turn, in his teens he became politically active, militating in the Vertiente Artiguista until 1990, when he joined the Movement of Popular Participation (MPP). He began by participating in a collection of signatures for the 1989 amnesty referendum on the Law on the Expiration of the Punitive Claims of the State.

In 1986, he began a degree in international relations at the University of the Republic, however, he dropped out after a month. Subsequently, he enrolled at the Instituto de Profesores Artigas in Montevideo to study for a teaching post in history in secondary education, graduating in 1991.

== Political career ==
=== Early political career ===
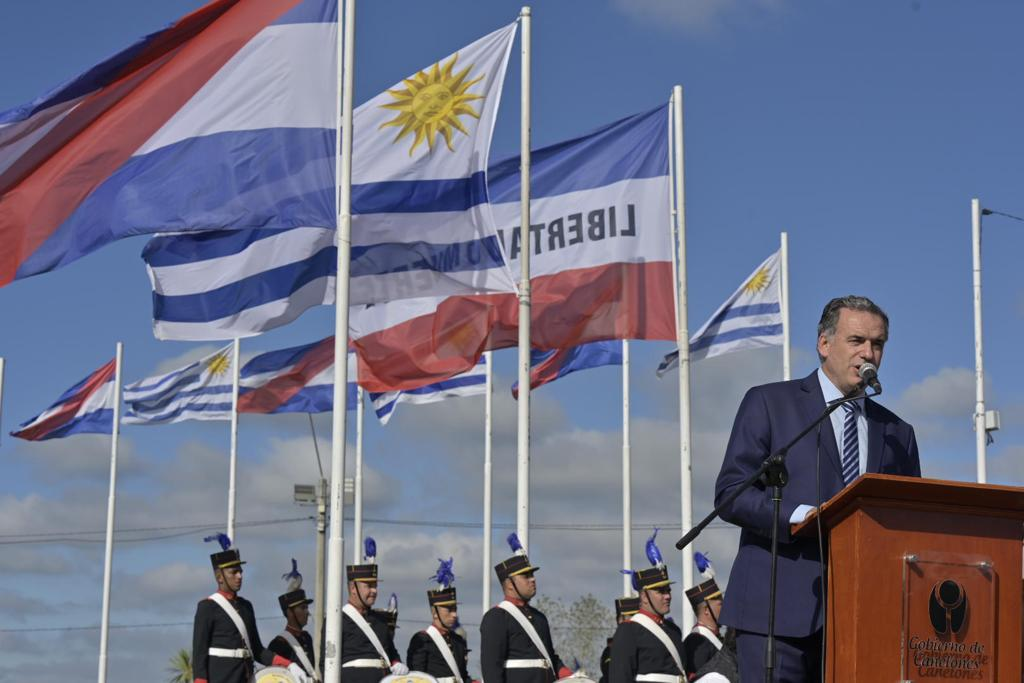
Orsi giving a speech at a ceremony commemorating the Battle of Las Piedras; 18 May 2023.

In 2004, while still working as a history teacher in Maldonado, he ran unsuccessfully for the Chamber of Representatives as the fourth candidate on the electoral list of the Movement of Popular Participation in the Canelones Department. In early 2005, he was announced as Marcos Carámbula's first alternate in his candidacy for Intendant of Canelones. Following Carámbulas's victory in the municipal elections of that year, Orsi was appointed Secretary General of the Intendancy. After the 2010 election, he was confirmed in office after the re-election of the Carámbula administration. Since July 2005, he has been a member of the national and departmental board in Canelones of the Movement of Popular Participation.

=== Intendant of Canelones (2015–2024) ===
In early March 2015, he resigned to run for Intendant. His candidacy was supported by various sectors of the Broad Front, such as the MPP, the Communist Party, the Vertiente Artiguista, and Casa Grande. In the 2015 election, he was elected Intendant of the Canelones Department with 37% of the vote, being the candidate with the most votes from the party with the most votes, according to the Ley de Lemas system. He took office on 9 July 2015. In October 2019, facing the second round of the general election, Orsi was appointed campaign manager for Broad Front nominee Daniel Martínez Villamil. On 7 February 2020, he resigned from the position of Intendant of Canelones, being succeeded by Tabaré Costa. However, he launched his campaign for re-election, and in the municipal election of that year, he was re-elected in office.

=== 2024 presidential campaign ===
After the Broad Front's electoral defeat in the 2019 general election, Orsi began to be seen as a contender for the 2024 presidential primaries. On 19 March 2023, the Movement of Popular Participation officially announced its support for his candidacy. He also received the support of the Vertiente Artiguista and other leftist sectors of the party. On 9 December 2023, during the Broad Front Congress, Orsi's candidacy was made official, as well as that of Mario Bergara, Carolina Cosse, and Andrés Lima.

== Presidency (2025–present) ==
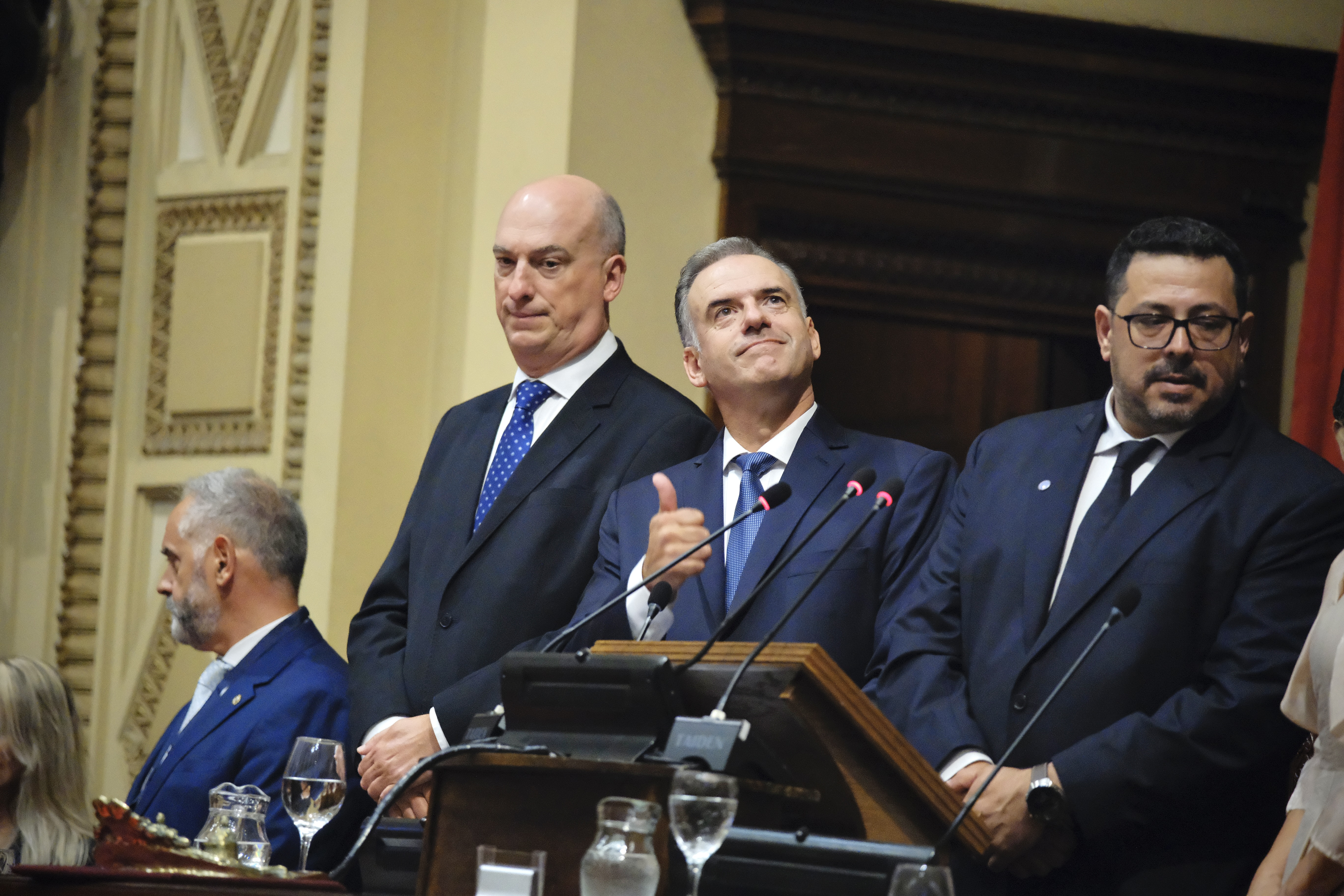
Orsi during his presidential inauguration at the Legislative Palace; 1 March 2025.

Orsi was the Broad Front's candidate for president in the 2024 Uruguayan general election. He emerged with a plurality of 43.2–44% in the first round on 27 October and faced Álvaro Delgado of the Coalición Multicolor in the runoff on 24 November, which Orsi won. After the projection of the results, he was congratulated by several heads of state across the world, including from Gabriel Boric, Nicolás Maduro, and Claudia Sheinbaum. Additionally, he was also congratulated by international politicians such as Yolanda Díaz, Cristina Fernández de Kirchner, and Mauricio Macri. After the night of the presidential runoff, Orsi's first public activity as president-elect was visiting former president José Mujica and his wife, former vice president Lucía Topolansky, at their private residence in the outskirts of Montevideo. The following day, outgoing president Luis Lacalle Pou chaired a meeting with the nation's cabinet to plan out the presidential transition for Orsi.

On 23 September, during his campaign ahead of the 2024 general elections, Orsi announced his first cabinet member, economist Gabriel Oddone would proceed as the Ministry of Economy and Finance during his administration. On 27 November, Orsi assigned Alejandro Sánchez Pereira to serve as the Secretary of the Presidency. In the following days, Orsi began appointing more representatives for his upcoming administration, including Alfredo Fratti, recommended by José Mujica himself, as Minister of Livestock, Agriculture, and Fisheries, and Cristina Lustemberg as Minister of Public Health, among others. By 16 December, Orsi officially announced all the members of his cabinet.

Upon his election as president-elect, Orsi met with several international politicians in the preceding days to discuss relations between Uruguay and their nation, including meetings on 28 November, with the Chinese Ambassador to Uruguay, Huang Yazhong, who delivered him a letter from General Secretary of the Chinese Communist Party Xi Jinping to congratulate his win in hopes of deepening ties with China, and with Luiz Inácio Lula da Silva in Brasília to discuss infrastructure projects.

On 6 December, the 2024 summit of Mercosur began in Montevideo, where Orsi participated as an invited guest of former President Lacalle Pou. At the summit, the final text of the EU–Mercosur free trade agreement was concluded after nearly 25 years of negotiations, during which, Orsi held bilateral meetings with regional leaders, including Luis Arce, Santiago Peña, and Gustavo Petro.

On 2 February 2025, Orsi announced that he would not be moving to the official presidential residence in Montevideo and would instead continue to live in his residence in Salinas.

== Personal life ==
Orsi is married to Laura Alonsopérez, an actress and ballet dancer originally from Maldonado. Together, the couple have two children, twins Lucía and Victorio, born in 2012. Orsi resides with his family in the municipality of Salinas. Despite his Catholic upbringing, Orsi now considers himself an agnostic. Orsi is an avid association football fan and a supporter of Club Atlético Peñarol.

== See also ==
- List of current heads of state and government
- List of heads of the executive by approval rating
