= Green Animalist Party =

Uruguayan green party

Green Animalist Party Partido Verde Animalista
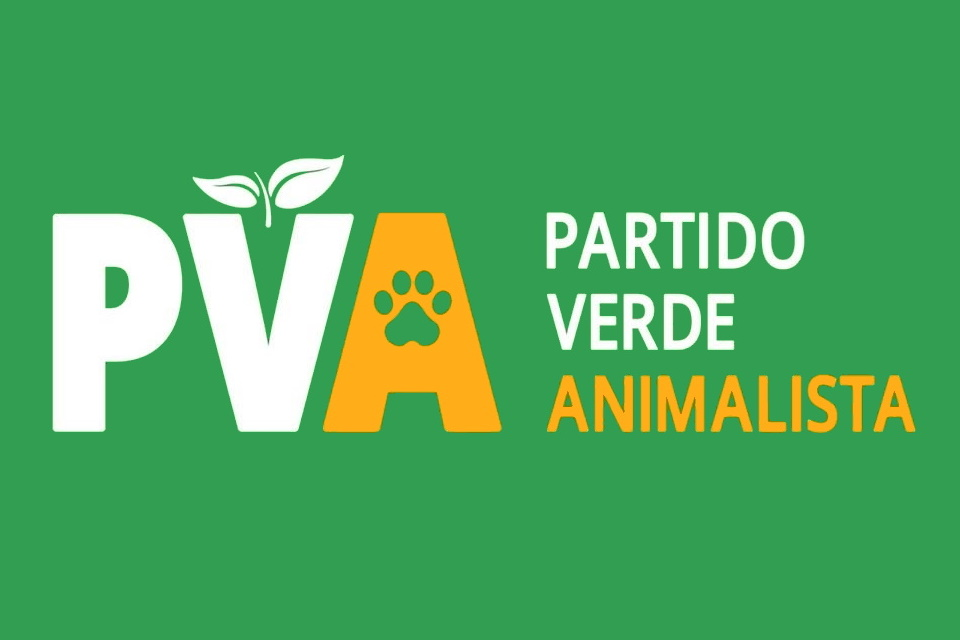
- Leader: Rita Rodríguez González
- Founded: 28 October 2018; 7 years ago
- Ideology: Green conservatism Animal rights Direct democracy
- Political position: Centre to centre-right

Website
- Partido Verde Animalista

The Green Animalist Party (Spanish: Partido Verde Animalista, acronym PVA) is a Uruguayan conservative green party established in 2018, which places a particular emphasis on animal rights.

On 30 June 2019, its candidates took part in the primary elections and gained the right to participate in the October general election. Their presidential candidate was Gustavo Salle, and Enrique Viana was intended to be his running mate, but after Viana declined his participation, the party proclaimed Ana Cordano as the candidate for vicepresidency. In the general election, the party obtained 19,392 votes, around 0.83%, therefore, it failed to get any parliament representation. After the general elections, Salle left the party to create his own party.

The party competed again in the 2024 presidential primaries, where two nominees submitted their candidacy: philosophy teacher Rita Rodríguez González from the group Desafio, and the environmentalist and university professor Raúl Viñas for the group Movimiento por un Uruguay Sustentable. Rodríguez obtained 1,084 votes against 293 of Viñas, then she became the presidential candidate for the party in the 2024 general elections. The party did not gather enough delegates to keep its candidate in the presidential election.

== Electoral history ==
=== Presidential elections ===
Election	Party candidate	Running mate	Votes	%	Votes	%	Result
Election	Party candidate	Running mate	First Round		Second Round		Result
2019	Gustavo Salle	Ana Cordano	19,392	0.83%	-	-	Lost ✗
2024	Rita Rodríguez González	TBA					

=== Chamber of Deputies and Senate elections ===
Election	Votes	%	Chamber seats	+/-	Position	Senate seats	+/-	Position
2019	19,392	0.83%	0 / 99	Steady	9th	0 / 30	Steady	9th
2024								
