= Gustavo Salle =

Uruguayan lawyer and politician

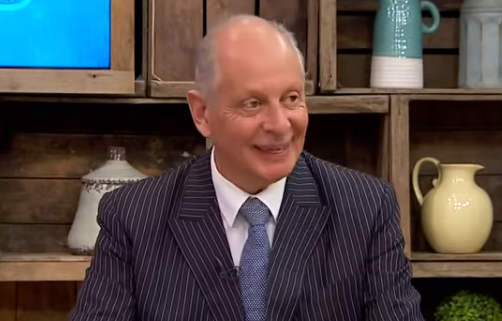

National Representative
- Incumbent
- Assumed office 15 February 2025
- Constituency: Montevideo

Personal details
- Born: Gustavo Alberto Salle Lorier; 19 March 1958 (age 68) Montevideo, Uruguay
- Party: Sovereign Identity (since 2022)
- Other political affiliations: Broad Front (1971–2004); Green Animalist (2019)
- Spouse: Alba Pereira
- Children: 2
- Parents: Ariel Salle (father); Esther Lorier (mother)
- Education: University of the Republic
- Occupation: Politician; lawyer

Gustavo Alberto Salle Lorier (born March 19, 1958) is a Uruguayan lawyer and politician serving as National Representative since February 2025. Founder and leader of the far-right, nationalist Sovereign Identity party, he was a presidential candidate in the 2019 and 2024 general elections.

Graduated from the University of the Republic with a law degree, gained notoriety by filing criminal complaints against members of the Broad Front governments and for his activism against the installation of the UPM-Kymmene cellulose production plants in Uruguay. Salle is widely known for his flamboyant personality, aggressive and anti-establishment rhetoric and embrace of conspiracy theories, including the New World Order, that of the so-called "kleptocorporatocracy" or government of the corporations and that of the Judeo-Masonic secret coalition.

== Early life and legal career ==
Salle Lorier was born in Montevideo on March 19, 1958, the youngest child of Ariel Salle, an administrative employee at a car importing company, and Esther Lorier, a schoolteacher. His brother Carlos Salle was a professor at the Faculty of Dentistry before he died. He was raised in the Sayago neighborhood in a middle-class family and attended public schools. His parents were supporters of the Colorado Party and campaigned for Battlism during the leadership of Luis Batlle Berres.

In 1976 he enrolled at the University of the Republic and graduated with a law degree in 1982. He gained notoriety for taking several legal actions and making outrageous accusations, such as that former president Tabaré Vázquez was a "CIA agent" and a request for the extradition of former US Secretary of State Henry Kissinger for being the "ideologist" of Operation Condor. He also filed charges against high-ranking politicians, such as Vice President Raúl Fernando Sendic, for "usurpation of a university degree" in 2016, as well as against other government officials during the Broad Front administrations for cases of corruption and mishandling of public funds.

== Activist and political career ==
In his youth, Salle supported the Broad Front, however after the party reached the presidency for the first time, he disaffiliated from it and had approaches to the Popular Assembly.

In addition to his legal career in criminal defense, he has been an anti-imperialist and "anti-corporate" activist. Since the announcement of the installation of a second cellulose pulp plant by the Finnish company UPM-Kymmene Oyj in Uruguay, Salle has staunchly opposed it. In May 2019, he chained himself in Plaza Independencia in front of the Executive Tower, alleging that the contract that was signed was "null, criminal, and abusive, in addition to having a genocidal projection because it contaminates the water that we give them and they return contamination to us".

Salle has been characterized by a radical, aggressive and anti-establishment discourse, even insulting some politicians. For several years, during official events in Florida for Independence Day attended by the president of the Republic and government officials, he has appeared with megaphones to protest and to interrupt the speeches.

In early 2019, he joined the Green Animalist Party (PVA) and launched his presidential campaign. In the June presidential primaries, his candidacy surpassed the electoral threshold of 500 votes, allowing him to participate in the general election. In the general election, he received 19,392 votes, which represented 0.80% of the electorate, and was not elected to any office.

From 2020 to 2022, his media prominence grew due to his activism against health measures implemented during the COVID-19 pandemic, as well as his opposition to vaccination, which was not mandatory in Uruguay. He also echoed conspiracy theories about the pandemic, dubbing it 'Plandemia' – a portmanteau of the words 'plan' and 'pandemia' (Spanish for 'Pandemic'). In November 2022, he founded the Sovereign Identity party, describing it as neither left-wing nor right-wing, and ran for president for a second time. In the 2024 general election, he received 2.69% of the vote, making him the fourth most-voted candidate, and securing two seats for his party in the Chamber of Representatives.

== Controversies ==
=== Comments on the Jewish community ===
His embrace of conspiracy theories, including the Judeo-Masonic one, and his comments in support of them, have sparked controversy. In October 2024, after being elected National Representative, he referred to the Department of Maldonado, home to a significant Jewish population, as 'a territory occupied by Zionism and an appendix of the government of Israel.' His statements were met with condemnation from institutions of the Jewish community in Uruguay, one of the most prominent in Latin America.

Another controversy arose when he tweeted that 'it would be necessary to investigate how the Jewish lobby got Cohen into the GACH,' referring to Dr. Henry Cohen Engelman, an academic and physician who was part of the government's scientific advisory committee (GACH for its acronym in Spanish) during the COVID-19 pandemic. The Central Israelite Committee of Uruguay and the Uruguayan division of B'nai B'rith along with figures such as former president Julio María Sanguinetti, condemned the comment and even called for official action by the Prosecutor's Office. Salle has also referred to Freemasonry as a "pawn of Judeo-Zionism" and the "top" of B'nai B'rith, and has been accused of being anti-Semitic.

== Personal life ==
Despite being raised Catholic, he is an atheist.

== Electoral history ==
=== Presidential ===
Election	Office	List	Votes			Ref.
Election	Office	List	Total	%	P.	Ref.
2019	President of Uruguay	Green Animalist Party	19,392	0.80%	9th	
2024	President of Uruguay	Sovereign Identity	65,796	2.69 %	4th	
