= Carolina Cosse =

Uruguayan politician and engineer (born 1961)

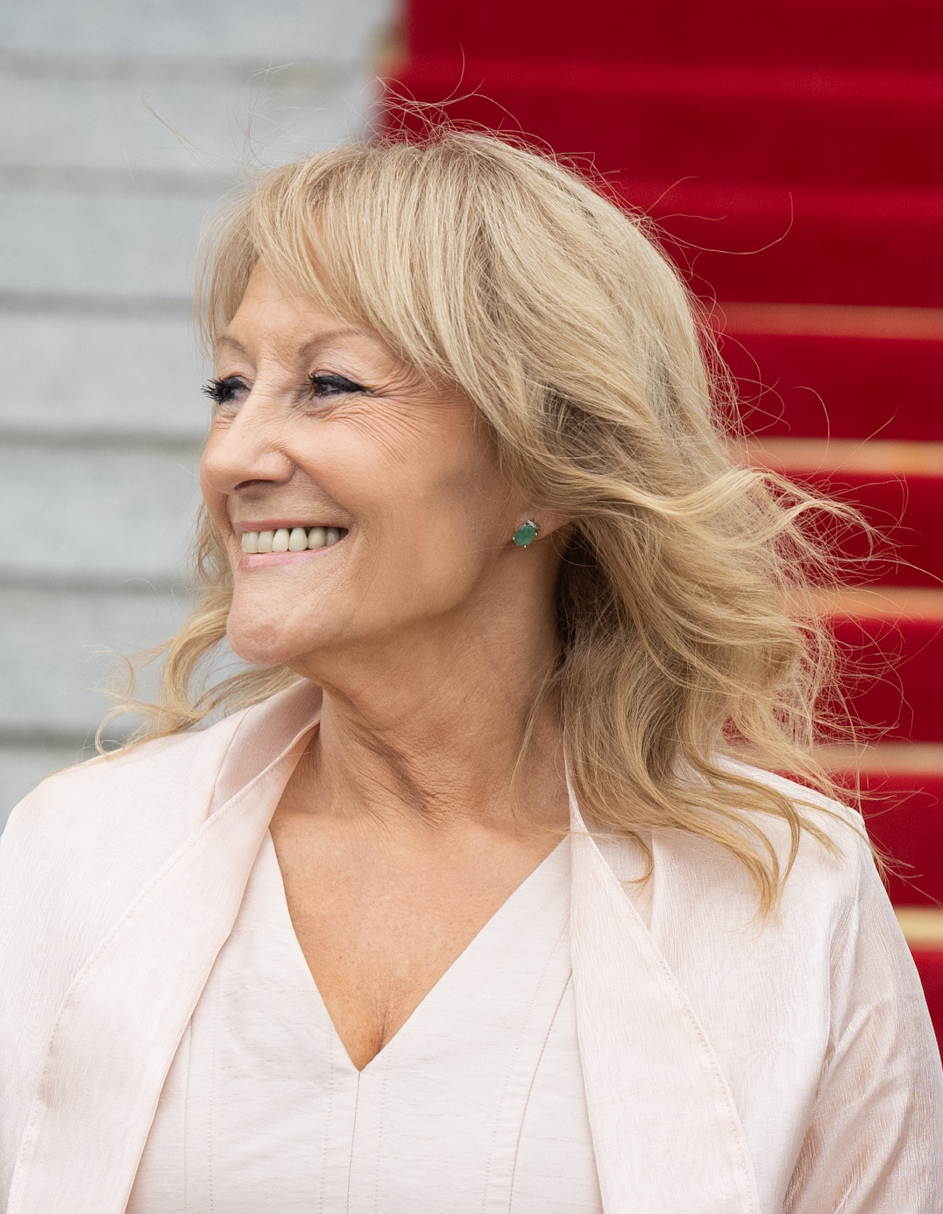
- Cosse in 2025

19th Vice President of Uruguay
- Incumbent
- Assumed office 1 March 2025
- President: Yamandú Orsi
- Preceded by: Beatriz Argimón

24th Intendant of Montevideo
- In office 27 November 2020 – 8 July 2024
- Preceded by: Christian Di Candia
- Succeeded by: Mauricio Zunino

Senator of Uruguay
- In office 15 February 2020 – 20 November 2020

Minister of Industry, Energy and Mining
- In office 2 March 2015 – 23 January 2019
- President: Tabaré Vázquez
- Preceded by: Roberto Kreimerman
- Succeeded by: Guillermo Moncecchi

President of ANTEL
- In office May 2010 – 28 February 2015
- Preceded by: Beno Ruchansky
- Succeeded by: Andrés Tolosa

Director of the Information Technology Division of the Intendancy of Montevideo
- In office 2007–2010

Personal details
- Born: Ana Carolina Cosse Garrido; 25 December 1961 (age 64) Montevideo, Uruguay
- Party: Broad Front
- Children: Rodrigo, Ángeles
- Parents: Villanueva Cosse (father); Zulma Garrido (mother)
- Education: University of the Republic
- Occupation: Politician
- Profession: Electrical engineer Mathematical engineer

Ana Carolina Cosse Garrido (born 25 December 1961) is a Uruguayan engineer and politician who is serving as the Vice President of Uruguay since 2025, after winning the 2024 general election. She served as Intendant of Montevideo from November 2020 until her resignation in July 2024. A member of the Broad Front, she served as Minister of Industry, Energy, and Mining from 2015 to 2019 during the second administration of President Tabaré Vázquez. In the 2019 Uruguayan general election, she was elected to the Senate of Uruguay, taking her seat on 15 February 2020. On 27 September 2020, she was elected Intendant of Montevideo, the capital of the country.

== Early life and education ==
Ana Carolina Cosse Garrido was born and raised in the capital city of Montevideo on 25 December 1961 to Villanueva Cosse, a history professor and actor primarily active in Argentina, and Zulma Garrido, between the neighbourhoods of Villa Española and Curva de Maroñas. Cosse is of French and Spanish descent. She began her studies at Primary School N.º 117. In 1991, Cosse graduated from the Faculty of Engineering of the University of the Republic with a degree in electrical engineering. During her college years, she joined the Union of Communist Youth (UJC).

After her academic career, she mainly worked for private corporations, including Siemens, Claro, and Verizon. She also provided assistance to governmental agencies such as designing and supervising the first structured cabling for the state under the Ministry of Foreign Relations and developing fingerprint capture devices for the Venezuelan National Electoral Council between 1994 and 1999. In 2009, Cosse obtained a master's degree in mathematical engineering.

== Early political career ==
Cosse's political career began in 2007 when she assumed the position of director of the Information Technology Division of the Indendancy of Montevideo. Among the policies she enacted in office was the technological implementation of the city's Metropolitan Transportation System (STM).

In May 2010, President José Mujica appointed her as president of the National Administration of Telecommunications (Antel), a position she held until 2015. In December 2014, after the election of Tabaré Vázquez for a new presidential term was confirmed, it was announced that Cosse would be the head of the Ministry of Industry, Mining and Energy, a position she assumed on March 2, 2015. During her tenure at the head of that ministerial portfolio, a data center was built, and a submarine cable was installed that connected Uruguay to the United States. In addition, the Antel Arena was built, a venue whose construction was marked by controversies and interruptions during the years in which Cosse was at the head of Antel and the Ministry of Industry.

== 2019 presidential campaign ==
In 2018, she began to be seen as a possible candidate for the presidency or vice presidency in the 2019 election. She announced her candidacy for the 2019 presidential primaries in September 2018 and was officially nominated at the Plenary of the Broad Front on November 10, alongside Daniel Martínez, Óscar Andrade, and Mario Bergara. Cosse's candidacy was supported by the Movement of Popular Participation and other groups further to the left of the Broad Front.

In the Broad Front primary election on June 30, 2019, Cosse obtained 25.43% of the vote, placing second behind Daniel Martínez, who was elected the party's candidate for that year's general election. Following the presidential primaries, speculation began about who would be Martínez's running mate and Cosse was one of the leading options, as she finished second. However, on July 5, it was announced that Martínez had chosen Graciela Villar, a former member of the Montevideo legislature, as his running mate and vice-presidential candidate. Cosse publicly criticized the selection process for the vice-presidential candidate, claiming that it was not positive for the "unity of the party".

She also announced that she would run for the Senate on the Lista Amplia electoral list, in an alliance with the Communist Party, which arose after the refusal of the Movement of Popular Participation, the largest sector of the Broad Front that had previously supported her candidacy for the primaries, to include her on its electoral list for the upper house of the General Assembly. In the general election, she was elected Senator of the Republic for the 49th Legislature, taking office on February 15, 2020.

== Intendant of Montevideo (2020–2024) ==
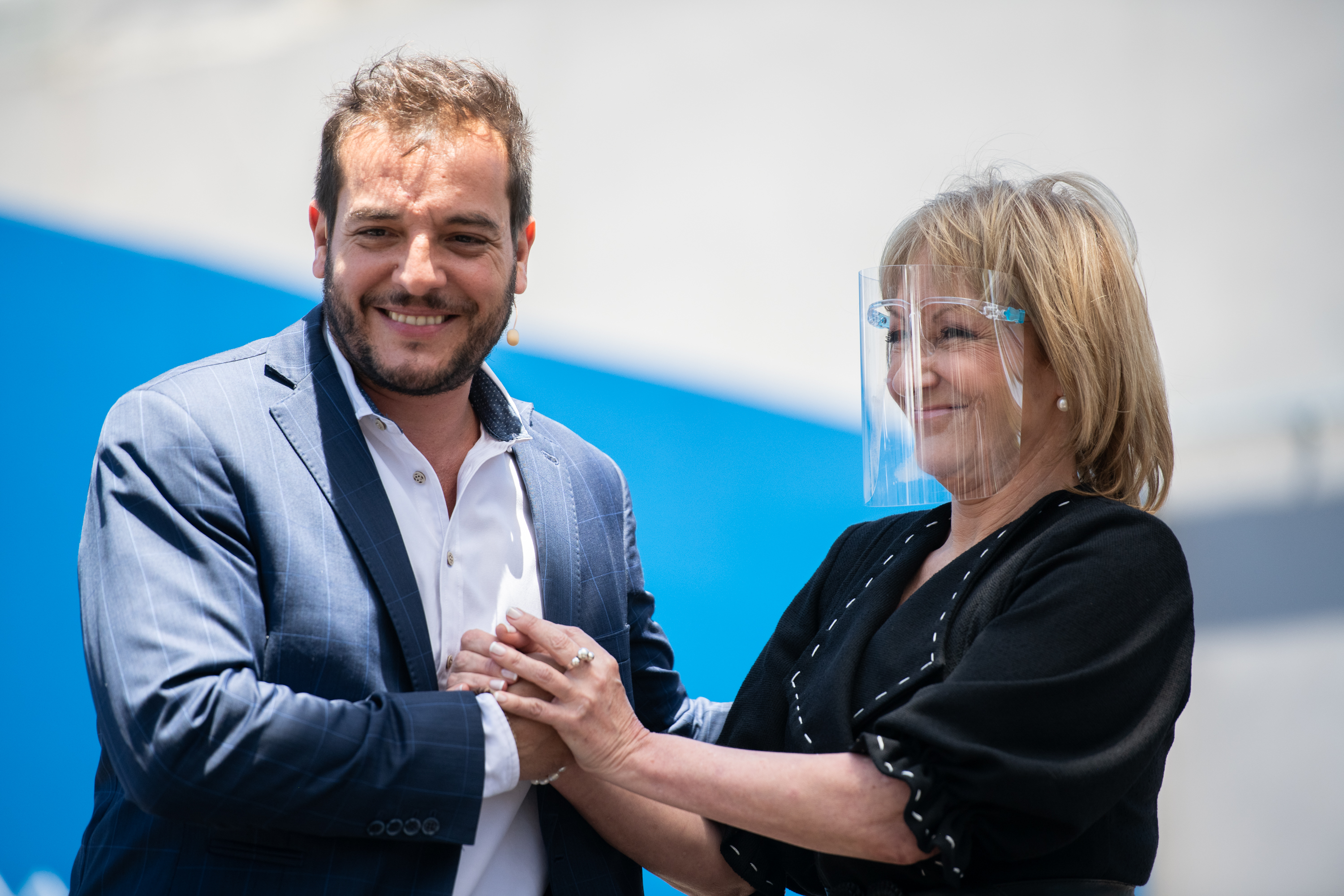
Cosse at her inauguration with outgoing Intendant Christian Di Candia

Beginning in late 2019, before she took her seat in the Senate, rumors began to circulate that Cosse could be a candidate for the Broad Front to Intendant of Montevideo, head of the capital's government. On January 29, she was officially nominated by her party, along with Daniel Martínez and Álvaro Villar. Her candidacy was supported by the Communist Party, the Socialist Party and the Victory's People Party, as well as other minority groups and constituent parties.

Despite having been nominated as a candidate for Intendant of Montevideo, Cosse assumed her seat in the Senate and occupied it during the electoral campaign.

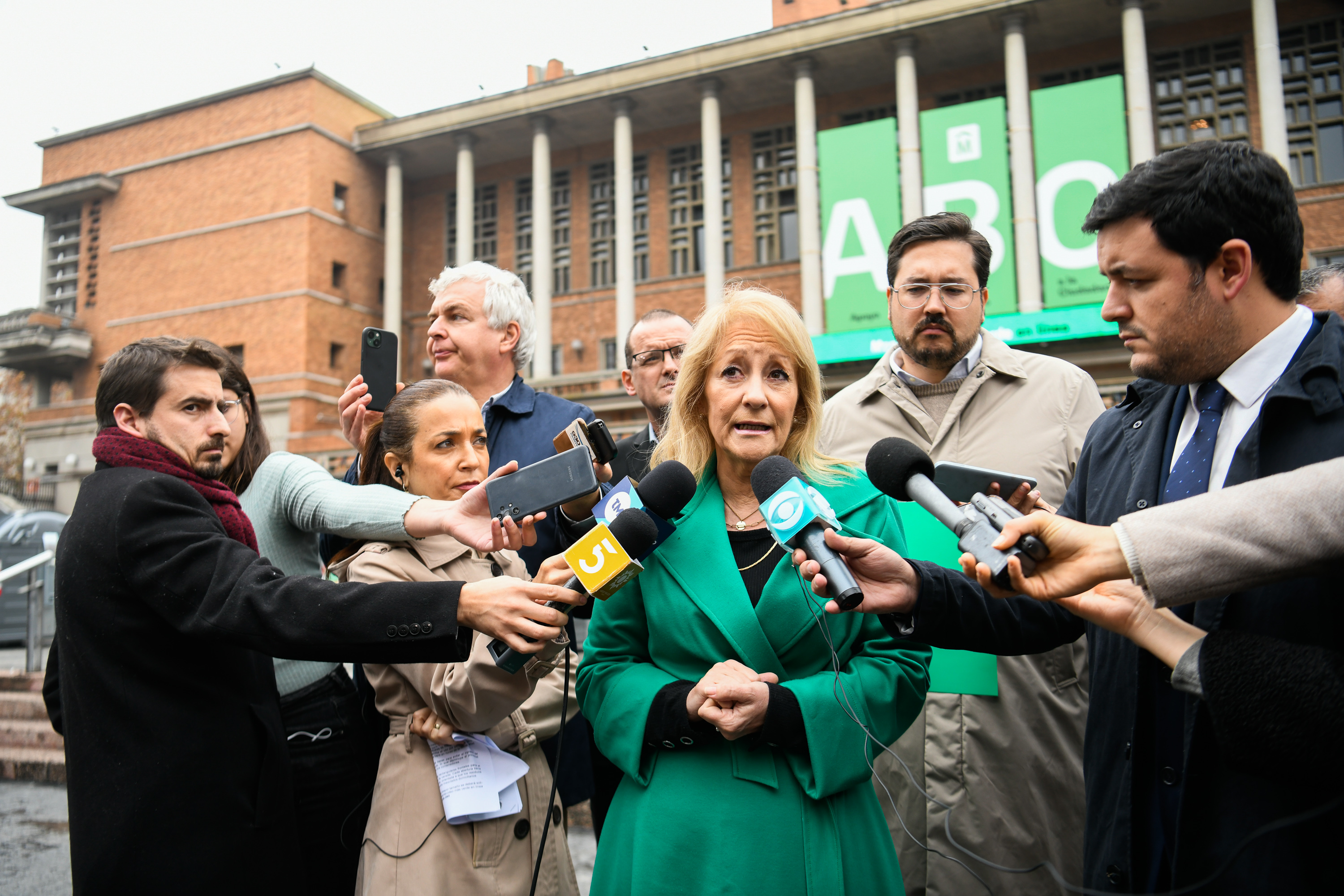
Cosse in front of the Montevideo City Hall during a press conference

Cosse won the 2020 municipal election with 21.01% of the vote. Although the candidate of the opposition Multicolor Coalition, Laura Raffo, obtained 40.03% and was the most voted candidate, Cosse still won due to the Ley de lemas system, in which the most voted candidate of the most voted party wins. She took office as Intendant on November 26, 2020 succeeding Christian Di Candia.

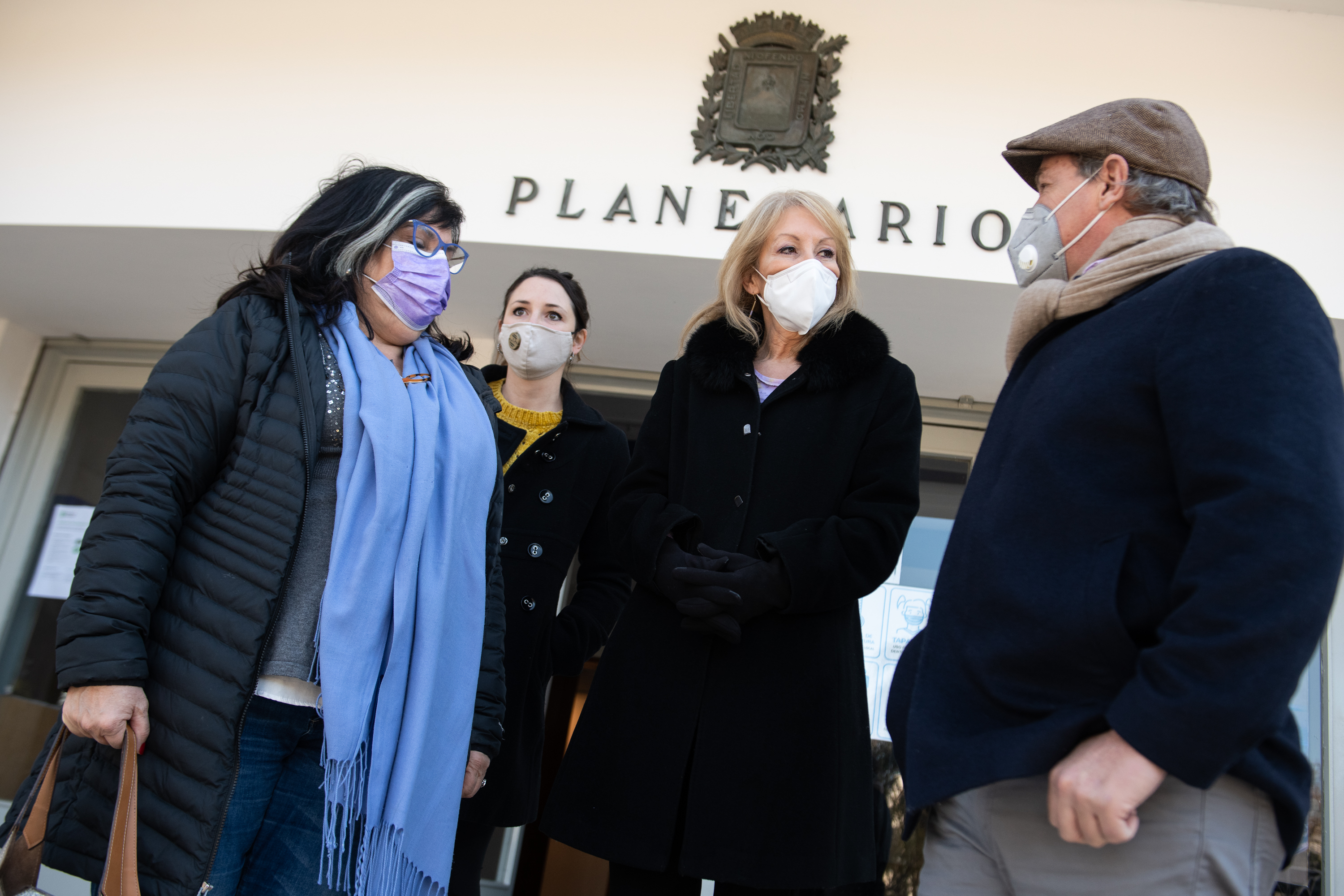
Reinauguration of the Municipal Planetarium, 2021

In March 2023, the Montevideo legislature, with opposition votes, summoned Intendant Cosse to give explanations about "the systematic lack of response to requests for information made by councilors". After Cosse did not appear to report back on her administration, the opposition promoted an impeachment alleging that she violated Article 285 of the Constitution, which establishes the power of the legislature to summon the Intendant "to request and receive the reports it deems appropriate, whether for legislative or oversight purposes". After the start of the process, the case was analyzed in the Senate's Constitution and Legislation Committee in accordance with the provisions of Article 296. Finally, the motion was rejected by the Senate, where not even the Multicolor Coalition supported it.

In 2023, United Nations Secretary-General António Guterres appointed Cosse to his Advisory Group on Local and Regional Governments, co-chaired by Pilar Cancela Rodríguez and Fatimatou Abdel Malick.

== 2024 presidential election ==
=== Presidential campaign ===
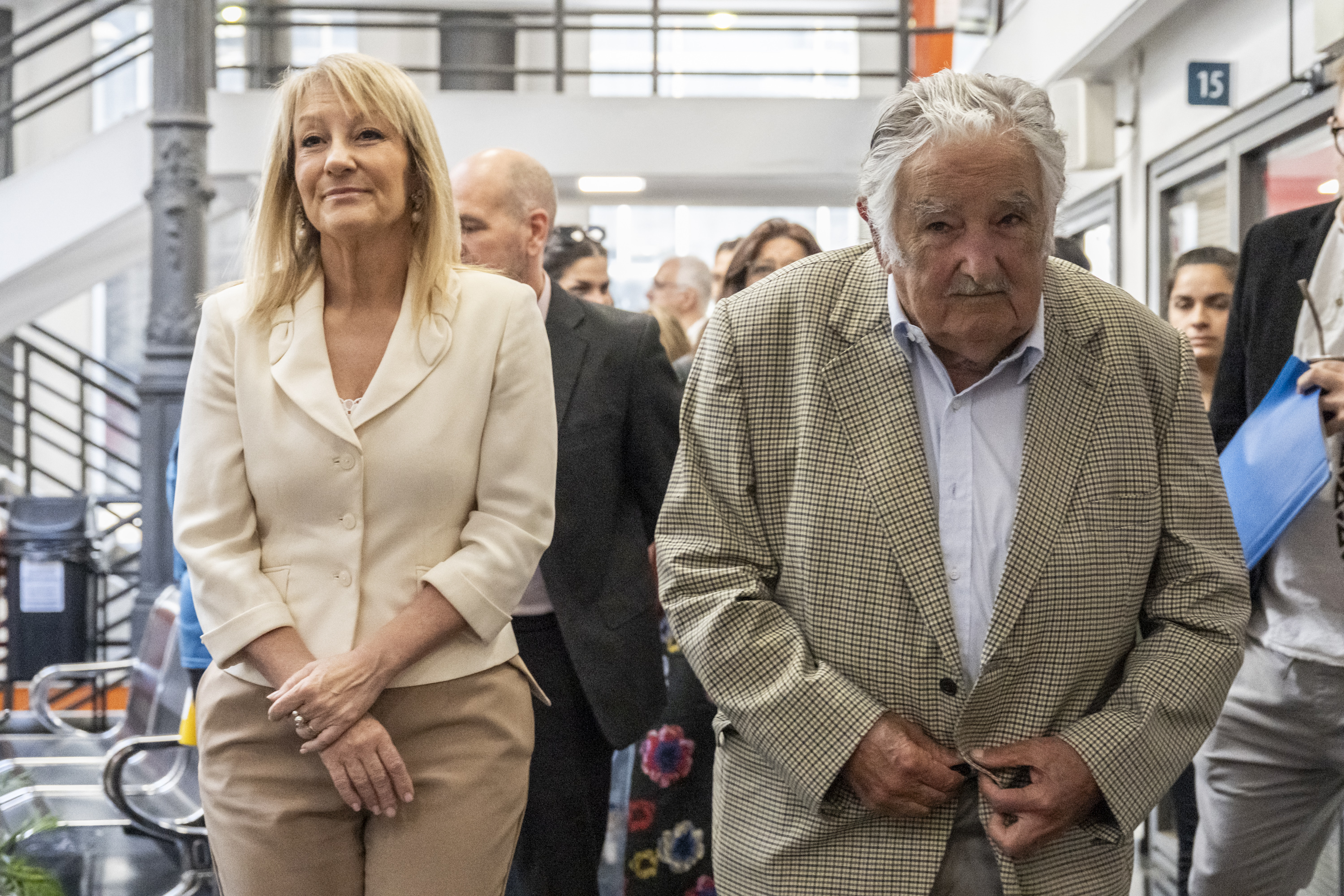
Cosse with former President José Mujica in December 2023

Throughout 2023 different constituent sectors of the Broad Front announced their support for a possible candidacy of Cosse for the 2024 presidential primaries, including the most left-wing ones, such as the Communist, Socialist and Revolutionary Workers' parties.

On November 8, 2023, still in the position of Intendant, Cosse formally announced her candidacy. She had previously said in 2020 that she would not run for president if she was elected Intendant of Montevideo. In late November 2023, she was polling at about 33% in national Broad Front primary opinion polls, second to Yamandú Orsi. On December 10, she was officially nominated by the Congress of the Broad Front, along with Orsi, Andrés Lima and Mario Bergara, who later withdrew his candidacy.

She announced that she would give her signature to promote the constitutional referendum proposed by the Plenario Intersindical de Trabajadores – Convención Nacional de Trabajadores to eliminate private pension companies. This sparked controversy because there was no consensus in the party on whether to support it or not. During the campaign, both former President José Mujica and his wife Lucía Topolansky, publicly criticized Cosse and stated that the Broad Front could lose the general elections if she were the presidential candidate. They later claimed that she could not beat the National Party because outside of Montevideo people "could not stand her", referring to the fact that Cosse focused her politics only on the capital.

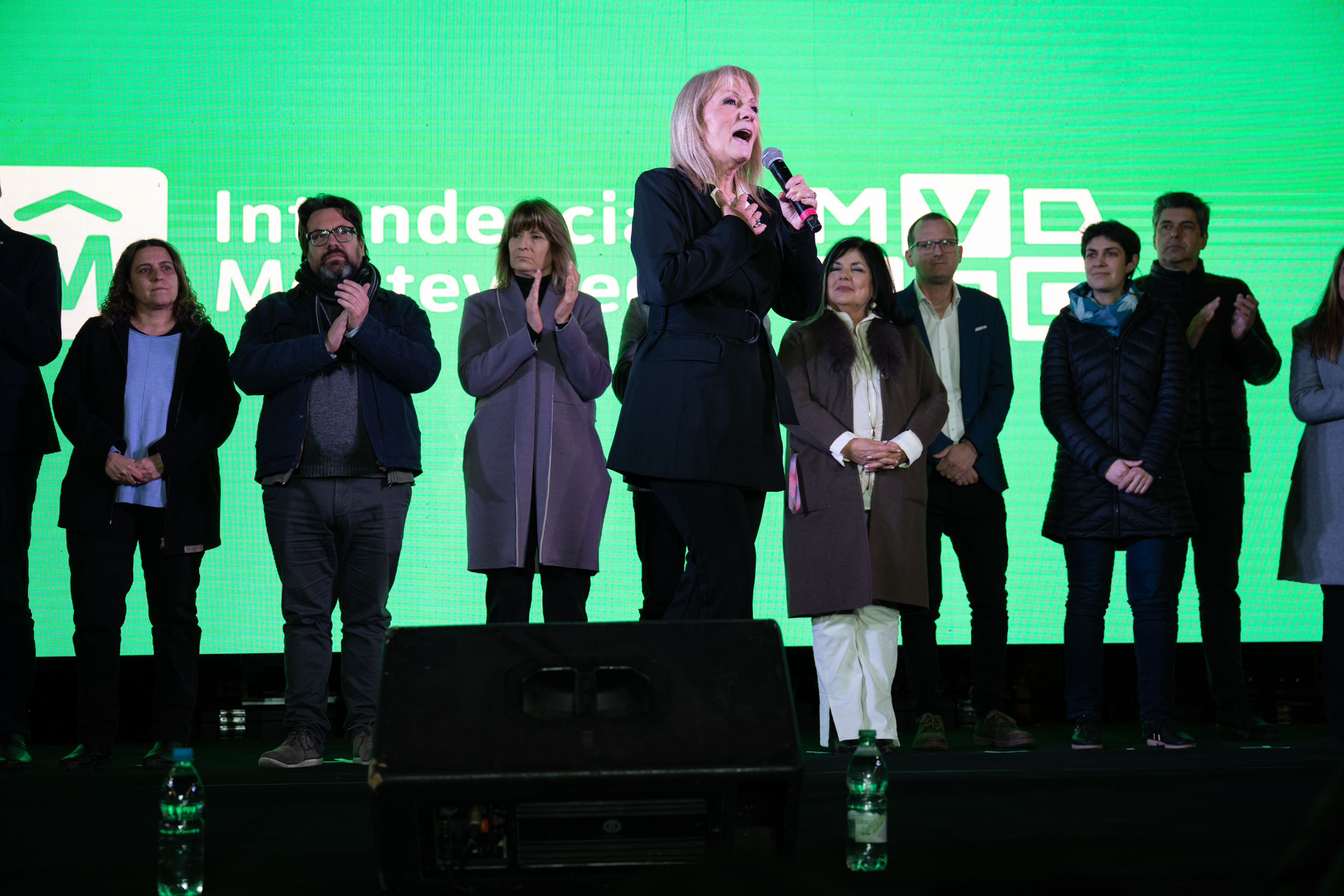
Cosse during the closing ceremony of her administration

Cosse lost to Orsi in the Broad Front primary in June 2024, with 36% of the votes. She lost in the Montevideo Department, which she was governing. However, she was selected by Orsi as his running mate for the general election. On July 8, she resigned as Intendant of Montevideo after having requested a "leave" in March, and held a closing ceremony for her administration that was criticized as "populist". She was succeeded by Macerlo Zunino.

=== Vice presidential campaign ===
Cosse was officially nominated for vice presidency by the Broad Front National Convention on August 3. She announced that she would not vote in favor of any of the constitutional referendums up for popular consultation. Regarding the reform to allow nighttime police raids, she said that a Broad Front government would not apply the measure. Her statements sparked controversy due to the possibility of not respecting the Constitution which she later retracted.

During the campaign she refused to participate in a debate between the vice-presidential candidates, thus rejecting proposals from the candidate for the National Party, Valeria Ripoll. Cosse became the vice president–elect after Orsi won the runoff of the 2024 general election.

== Personal life ==
Cosse has two children, Rodrigo and Ángeles. She is a supporter of Club Nacional de Football.
