= Álvaro Delgado (politician) =

Uruguayan politician (born 1969)

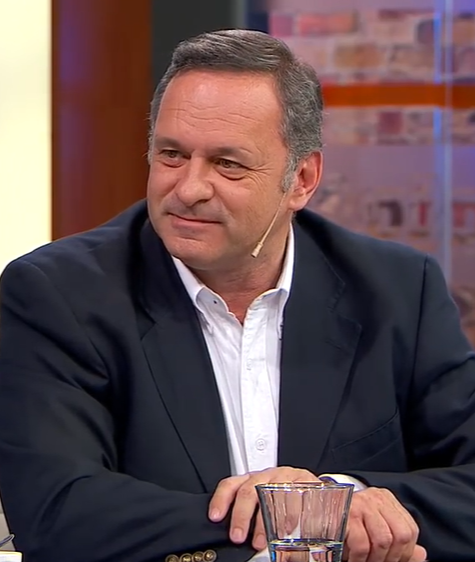
- Delgado in 2019

President of the National Party
- Incumbent
- Assumed office 7 July 2025

Senator of the Republic
- In office 15 February 2025 – 5 August 2025
- In office 15 February 2015 – 1 March 2020

Secretary of the Presidency of Uruguay
- In office 1 March 2020 – 21 December 2023
- President: Luis Alberto Lacalle Pou
- Preceded by: Miguel Toma
- Succeeded by: Rodrigo Ferrés

National Representative of Uruguay for Montevideo
- In office 15 February 2005 – 15 February 2015

Personal details
- Born: Álvaro Luis Delgado Ceretta; 11 March 1969 (age 57) Montevideo, Uruguay
- Party: National Party
- Spouse: Leticia Lateulade (m. 1997)
- Children: Agustina; Felipe; Pilar
- Education: University of the Republic
- Occupation: Veterinarian; politician

Álvaro Luis Delgado Ceretta (born 11 March 1969) is a Uruguayan veterinarian and politician of the National Party (PN), who served as the 18th Secretary of the Presidency of the Republic from 2020 to 2023. He also previously served as National Representative from 2005 to 2015, as well as Senator from 2015 to 2020. He was a candidate for president of Uruguay in the 2024 general election.

Born in Montevideo and graduated from the University of the Republic in 1995 with the degree of Doctor of Veterinary and Veterinary Technology, Delgado has a postgraduate degree in Agroindustrial Management in the School of Management and International Studies of the ORT University of Uruguay. After graduating he started working as a rural producer and was a veterinary advisor in agricultural establishments.

== Early life and education ==
Delgado was born in Montevideo on 11 March 1969 as the son of Omar Delgado, an accountant, and Celeste Ceretta, a pharmaceutical chemist. On his paternal side, he is of Spanish descent, tracing his ancestry to the Canary Islands, whereas on his mother's side, he is of Italian descent through Venetian immigrants who arrived in Uruguay at the end of the 19th century and settled in the Paysandú Department. Delgado, along with his younger sister, Adriana, was raised in the neighborhoods of Pocitos and Prado and attended the Sacred Heart School and the John XXIII Institute.

In 1987, Delgado enrolled at the University of the Republic, graduating in 1995 with a degree in veterinary medicine. During his academic career, he was a member of the academic senate of the Faculty of Veterinary Medicine, for the University Guild Current (CGU). In 1997, he obtained a diploma in agroindustrial management from the ORT University of Uruguay. Before entering a career in politics, Delgado worked as a rural producer and veterinary advisor in agricultural establishments.

== Political career ==
Delgado served as secretary to Senator Juan Carlos Raffo after joining his Senate campaign in 1989. In 1994 he was appointed secretary of the parliamentary nationalist caucus. In 1999, at the age of 29, he was appointed General Inspector of Labour, a position he held until December 2004.

In the 2004 general election, Delgado was elected National Representative for Montevideo Department for the 46th Legislature (2005–2010), as part of the Wilsonist Current. In 2008, Delgado left the Wilsonist Current and declared himself independent within the party. In June he endorsed Carmelo Vidalín for the presidential primaries, however, he withdrew his candidacy. Delgado later joined the new political group Aire Fresco – Lista 404 along with Luis Lacalle Pou.

In the 2009 general election, Delgado was re-elected National Representative to the 47th Legislature (2010–2015). During his terms in the Chamber of Representatives, he chaired the Energy and Mining Industry Commission (2006, 2011, 2012, and 2013). He was elected Senator of the Republic for the first time in the 2014 election. During his tenure in the Senate, he filed a complaint of various "irregular" events in the management of the state-owned company ANCAP between 2005 and 2015, invoking a parliamentary investigative commission. In 2016, he was part of the group of opposition senators who filed criminal complaints about the economic and financial situation of the company.

In the 2019 general election, he was the second-listed candidate to the Senate of the Aire Fresco ballot, which was the most voted in the entire National Party. In December, the then president-elect Luis Lacalle Pou appointed him Secretary of the Presidency. In February 2020, he assumed his senatorial seat, but resigned from it on March 1, when he took office as Secretary of the Presidency, succeeding Miguel Toma.

== 2024 presidential campaign ==
Álvaro Delgado began to be seen as a contender for the 2024 National Party presidential primaries since mid-2021. On November 18, 2023, he formally announced his candidacy for the Aire Fresco – Lista 404 sector of the party. On December 9 during the National Party Convention he announced that he would resign as head of the Presidential Secretariat on the 21st. In late November 2023, he was polling at about 52% in the National primary opinion polls. On December 21, 2023, he resigned from the position of Secretary of the Presidency to carry out his presidential campaign, which was officially launched on March 16, 2024, at a rally held at the Palacio Peñarol in Montevideo. On June 30, Delgado Ceretta won the National Party primary with a landslide victory of 74.4% of the vote, and was thus proclaimed the party's candidate for the October general election. After the results were announced, he announced Valeria Ripoll as his vice presidential running mate.

Delgado's campaign slogan reading "Re-elect a good government"

On August 10, Delgado Ceretta and Ripoll were officially nominated at the National Party Convention. Regarding the constitutional referendums under discussion, Delgado Ceretta positioned himself against the one referring to social security, and in favor of the one allowing nighttime raids. From August to October, Delgado and Ripoll held weekly press conferences announcing the campaign promises of their party manifesto, together with their respective teams in each area.

On August 1, he announced the then president of the Central Bank, Diego Labat Legarra, as Minister of Economy and Finance of his eventual administration. Throughout the campaign, Delgado stressed his intention to maintain and strengthen the Coalición Republicana alliance together with the Colorado, Cabildo Abierto and Independent parties for a runoff of the election. The first-timer in elections Constitutional Environmentalist Party joined the alliance after its leader and candidate Eduardo Lust announced that he would support Delgado for president in a runoff.

On October 22, Delgado and Ripoll held their closing campaign rally in Las Piedras, under the slogan of "ensuring the continuity" of Luis Lacalle Pou's coalition administration. By mid-October 2024, Delgado was polling around 21-23%. During the first round of the general election, Delgado emerged as the second-placer, with 26.77% of the vote. He was also elected Senator of the Republic as a candidate for the Aire Fresco electoral list. On November 3, he presented a manifesto with Andrés Ojeda, Guido Manini Ríos, Pablo Mieres and Eduardo Lust—the leaders of the Coalición Republicana parties.

Delgado participated in a presidential debate with Orsi on November 11. On November 20, he delivered a half-hour speech at the Obelisk to the Constituents of 1830 in Montevideo, at the closing rally of the campaign. His running mate Valeria Ripoll and the leaders of the Republican Coalition parties also spoke, and singer Lucas Sugo gave a concert. Delgado lost in the second round of voting on 24 November and conceded defeat to Yamandú Orsi.

== Personal life ==
Delgado met Leticia Lateulade while he was attending university in 1991, and they married in 1997. Together, they have three children: Agustina, Felipe, and Pilar.
