= Rodrigo Goñi Reyes =

Uruguayan lawyer and politician

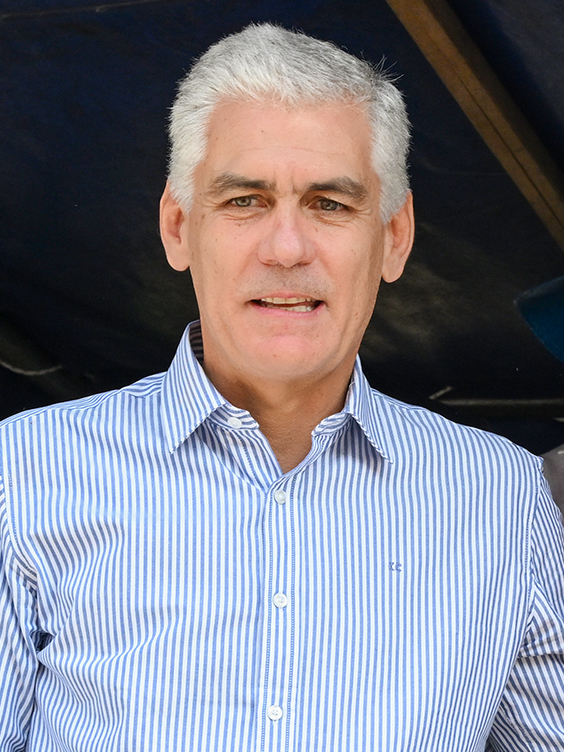

President of the Chamber of Representatives of Uruguay
- Incumbent
- Assumed office 1 March 2026
- Preceded by: Sebastian Valdomir

Member of the Chamber of Representatives of Uruguay
- Incumbent
- Assumed office 15 February 2015

Personal details
- Born: 3 July 1967 (age 59) Flores
- Party: National Party
- Education: University of the Republic
- Occupation: Politician,Lawyer

Rodrigo Goñi Reyes is a Uruguayan lawyer and politician who has been serving as President of the Chamber of Representatives of Uruguay since March 1, 2026.
