= 2024 Uruguayan general election =

- 27 October 2024; 24 November 2024 (runoff)
- Registered: 2,727,120
- Turnout: 89.60% (first round) ▼0.52pp 89.36% (second round) ▼0.24pp
- Presidential election
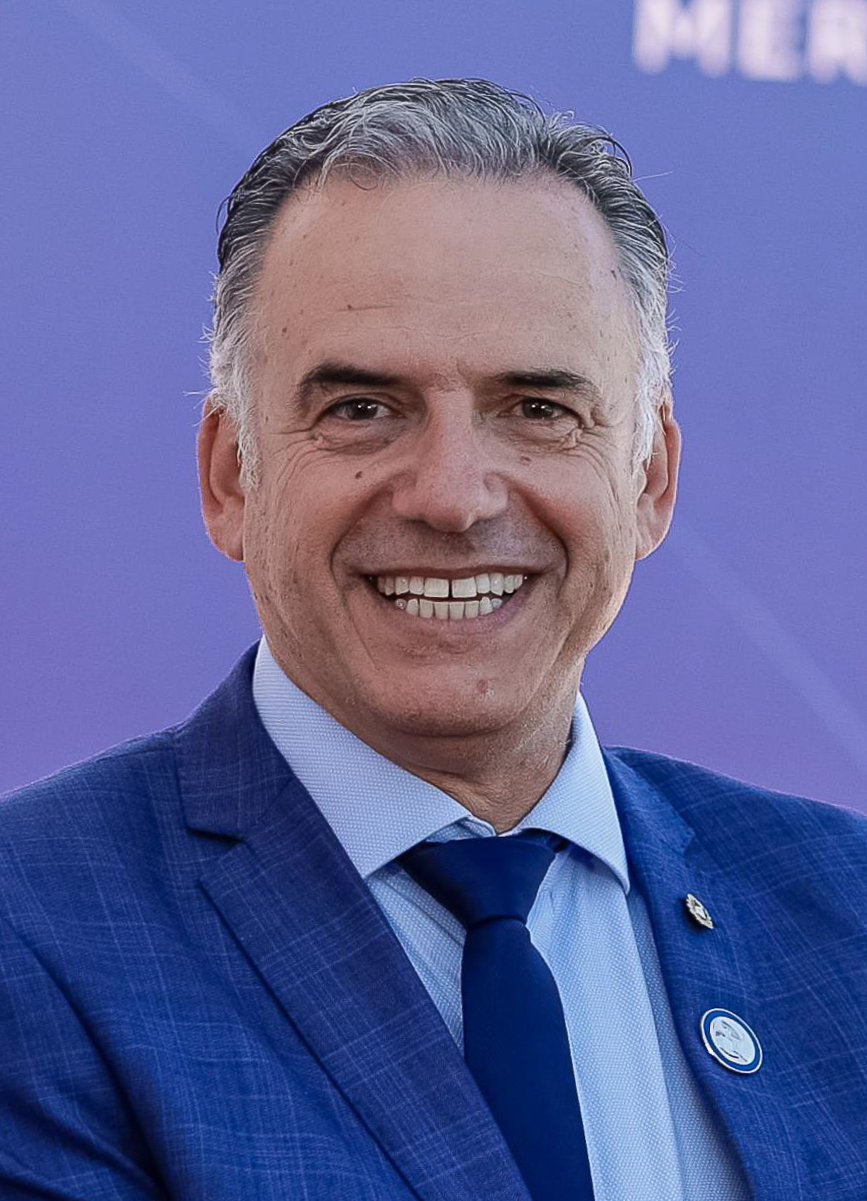

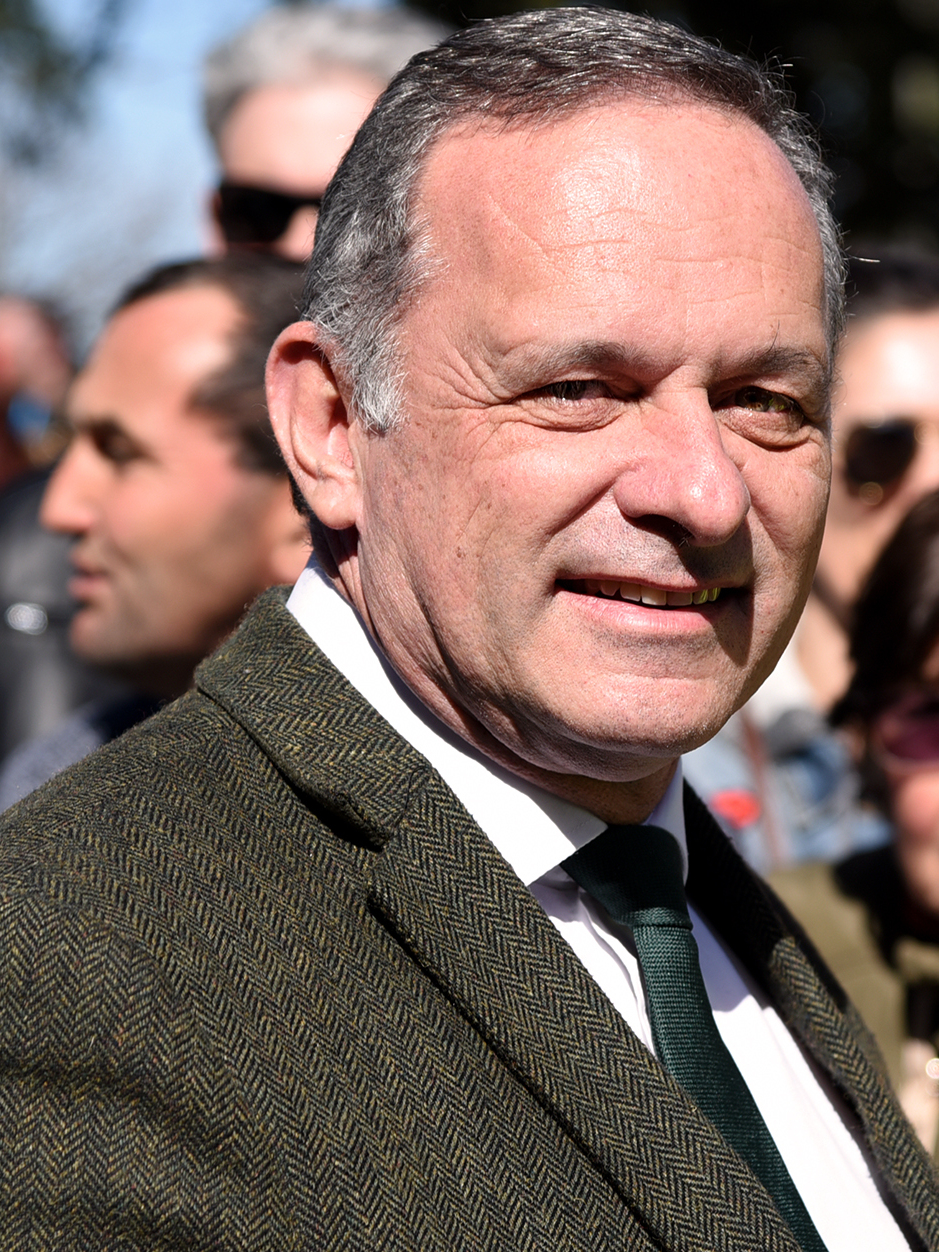
Nominee	Yamandú Orsi	Álvaro Delgado
Party	MPP	National
Alliance	Broad Front	Republican Coalition
Running mate	Carolina Cosse	Valeria Ripoll
Popular vote	1,212,833	1,119,537
Percentage	52.00%	48.00%
President before election
Luis Lacalle Pou
National
Elected President
Yamandú Orsi
Broad Front
- Chamber of Representatives
- 27 October 2024
- All 99 seats in the Chamber of Representatives
Party	Leader	Vote %	Seats	+/–
Broad Front	Yamandú Orsi	43.94	48	+6
National	Álvaro Delgado	26.77	29	−1
Colorado	Andrés Ojeda	16.85	17	+4
Sovereign Identity	Gustavo Salle	2.83	2	New
Cabildo Abierto	Guido Manini Ríos	2.58	2	−9
Independent	Pablo Mieres	1.80	1	0
This lists parties that won seats. See the complete results below.
- Senate
- 27 October 2024
- All 30 seats in the Senate
Party	Vote %	Seats	+/–
Broad Front	43.94	16	+3
National	28.15	9	−1
Colorado	16.85	5	+1
This lists parties that won seats. See the complete results below.

General elections were held in Uruguay on 27 October 2024. Since no presidential candidate received a majority in the first round of voting, a runoff took place on 24 November 2024, with Yamandú Orsi of the Broad Front defeating Álvaro Delgado of the Republican Coalition.

The first round of the election also coincided with two constitutional referendums on reforms to the social security system that would lower the retirement age, increase payouts and transfer privately managed savings to a state-run trust, and allowing for nighttime police raids in homes.

== Background ==
Incumbent president Luis Lacalle Pou, who won the 2019 elections, cannot run again as the constitution bars a president from immediate re-election. As a result, the governing National Party has to nominate a new candidate.

Lacalle Pou took office in 2020, heading the Multicolor Coalition, a big tent political alliance formed after October 2019 first round that remains active in the 2024 elections under the name Republican Coalition. His cabinet is composed of leaders from the member parties of the coalition, which holds a majority in both chambers of Parliament, allowing it to push through various legislative initiatives despite the Broad Front opposition.

During the period from 2020 to 2024, the government of Luis Lacalle Pou has faced various controversies and challenges. These have included issues related to the handling of the COVID-19 pandemic, economic policies, corruption scandals and social issues such as education reform and security.

== Electoral system ==
Voting in Uruguay is compulsory and extends to all citizens aged 18 and over. Those who cannot vote without a valid reason will face a fine or be sanctioned with the inability to carry out various public procedures. According to the Constitution of Uruguay, voting is not only a right of the citizen but above all, it is a duty as a citizen, as well as an obligation.

The President of Uruguay is elected using the two-round system, with a run-off held between the two most-voted candidates if no candidate receives 50% of the vote in the first round. The 30 members of the Senate are elected by proportional representation in a single nationwide constituency. The vice president, elected on the same ballot as the president, becomes president of the Senate, with his vote being determinant in case of tie. The 99 members of the Chamber of Representatives are elected by proportional representation in 19 multi-member constituencies based on the 19 departments. Seats are allocated using the highest averages method.

The elections are held using the double simultaneous vote method, whereby voters cast a single vote for the party of their choice for all three seats of Presidency, Senate and Chamber of Representatives.

== Parties and candidates ==
Presidential primaries were held on 30 June 2024 to nominate the presidential candidate for every political party. Fourteen political parties surpassed the minimum of 500 valid votes in the internal elections required by the Electoral Court to participate in the general elections. Of these fourteen, only eleven ultimately participated in these elections (the same number of parties as in the previous elections of 2019, but with different parties).

Below are the parties that surpassed the 2024 primary elections, listed by their results in the 2019 general elections.

=== Summary ===
Party	Ideology	2019 result				Status
Party	Ideology	First round votes (%)	Chamber	Senate	Run-off votes (%)	Status
National Party; Partido Nacional	Conservatism; Christian democracy	29.70%	30 / 99	10 / 30	50.79%	Government
Broad Front; Frente Amplio	Progressivism; Democratic socialism	40.49%	42 / 99	13 / 30	49.21%	Opposition
Colorado Party; Partido Colorado	Liberalism	12.80%	13 / 99	4 / 30	Did not advance	Government
Open Cabildo; Cabildo Abierto	National conservatism Right-wing populism	11.46%	11 / 99	3 / 30	Did not advance	Government
Intransigent Radical Ecologist Party; Partido Ecologista Radical Intransigente	Green liberalism	1.43%	1 / 99	0 / 30	Did not advance	Opposition
Independent Party; Partido Independiente	Christian humanism Christian democracy	1.01%	1 / 99	0 / 30	Did not advance	Government
Popular Assembly (PU-WF); Asamblea Popular (UP-FT)	Communism; Marxism-Leninism	0.90%	0 / 99	0 / 30	Did not advance	Extra-parliamentary
Green Animalist Party; Partido Verde Animalista	Green conservatism	0.83%	0 / 99	0 / 30	Did not advance	Extra-parliamentary
Sovereign Identity; Identidad Soberana	Conspiracy theorism Eco-nationalism; Third Position	Did not contest				
Environmental Constitutional Party; Partido Constitucional Ambientalista	Constitutionalism; Eco-nationalism	Did not contest				
For Necessary Changes; Por los Cambios Necesarios		Did not contest				
Republican Advance Party; Partido Avanzar Republicano	Liberalism	Did not contest				
Enough is Enough Party; Partido Basta Ya		Did not contest				
Republican Coalition; Republican Coalition	Big tent	Did not contest				

=== Candidates in second round ===
Party	Candidates		First round result		Endorsements
Party	President	Vice president	Votes	%	Endorsements
Broad Front	Yamandú Orsi b. 1967 (age 59); Santa Rosa, Canelones	Carolina Cosse	1,071,826	43.86	Leaders: Zaida Gonzalez (Colorado Party); Daniel Isi (Republican Advance Party); Ricardo Cohen (Popular Assembly PU-WF); Marcos Taramasco (Colorado Party); Marcelo Maute Saravia (National Party); Luis Guedes (National Party); Joaquín Guedes (National Party); Roberto Rivero (Colorado Party); Víctor Björgan (National Party); Roberto Araújo (National Party); Walter Machado (Colorado Party); Factions: LAURA Batllista – Lista 1616 (Colorado Party); Partido Comunista Revolucionario – Lista 960 (Popular Assembly PU-WF); Avanzar (Canelones) – Lista 937 (Republican Advance Party); Batllistas Independientes (Maldonado) – Lista 919 (Colorado Party); Renovación (Tacuarembó) – Lista 32 (National Party); Agrupación Lista 65 (Rivera) – Lista 65 (Colorado Party)
National Party	Álvaro Delgado b. 1969 (age 57); Montevideo	Valeria Ripoll	655,426	26.82	Republican Coalition Parties: Colorado Party; Open Cabildo; Independent Party; Environmental Constitutional Party
Blank/null vote
Parties: Sovereign Identity; Intransigent Radical Ecologist Party; Workers' Party; Workers' Struggle Front; Enough is Enough Party

=== Candidates in first round ===
==== Parties with parliamentary representation ====
Party	Presidential candidate			Vice Presidential candidate		
Party	Name Birth date and place	Prior experience	Party faction	Name	Prior experience	Party faction
National Party	Álvaro Delgado b. 1969 (age 57); Montevideo	Veterinarian; Secretary of the Presidency (2020–2023) See more: Senator of the Republic (2015–2020); National Representative for Montevideo (2005–2015)	(Aire Fresco)	Valeria Ripoll	Unionist; General Secretary of ADEOM (2017–2023)	(D Centro)
Broad Front	Yamandú Orsi b. 1967 (age 59); Santa Rosa, Canelones	History teacher Intendant of Canelones (2015–2024) See more: Secretary General of the Municipality of Canelones (2005–2015)	(MPP)	Carolina Cosse	Electrical Engineer; Intendant of Montevideo (2020–2024) See more: Senator of the Republic (2020); Minister of Industry, Energy and Mining (2015–2019); President of ANTEL (2010–2015); Director of the Information Technology Division of the Intendancy of Montevideo (2007–2010)	(La Amplia)
Colorado Party Factions: Vamos Uruguay! – 10; Lista 15 – 15; Lista 25 – 25; Ciudadanos – 600; Batllistas – 2025; Tercera Vía – 9007; LAURA Batllista – 1616; Corriente Constructora Liberal – 1716; Uruguay Es Posible – 321	Andrés Ojeda b. 1984 (age 42); Montevideo	Criminal defense lawyer See more: 2020 candidate for first substitute of the Intendant of Montevideo under Coalición Multicolor.; Lawyer of the SIFPOM (2019–present); Television pundit (2016–present); Member of the Montevideo Legislature (2010–2015)	(Lista 25)	Robert Silva	Lawyer; President of ANEP (2020–2023) See more: 2019 vice presidential candidate under the Colorado Party; General secretary of the Central Directive Council (CODICEN) (1999–2005); General secretary of the Council of Secondary Education (CES) (1996–1999)	(Ciudadanos)
Open Cabildo Factions: Todos Con Manini – 510; Derecha y Punto – 411; Encuentro Nacional Cristiano – 7001; La Gente de Manini – 1850; Nacimos Con El Prócer – 1815; Vamos Con Todo – 202; Proyecto Artiguista – 1829; Vamos Con Sodano – 48; Amanecer Artiguista – 7575; La Lista Del Personal Militar – 2614; Independientes al Cambio – 47; Volver al Origen – 2701; Vivir Mejor – 100	Guido Manini Ríos b. 1958 (age 67); Montevideo	Retired general officer Senator of the Republic (2020–present) See more: Commander-in-Chief of the Uruguayan Army (2015–2019)	(Todos con Manini)	Lorena Quintana	Family doctor Director of the SATP program of the MSP (2023–present) See more: Coordinator of the Adolescent and Youth Health Area at the MSP (2018-2023)	(Encuentro Nacional Cristiano)
Intransigent Radical Ecologist Party Factions: Ecologistas – 1330; Movimiento de los Comunes – 696	César Vega b. 1962 (age 64); Paysandú	Agronomist; National Representative for Montevideo (2020–present) See more: 2014 and 2019 presidential candidate under the PERI	(Ecologistas)	Sergio Billiris	Bookseller; N/A	(Ecologistas)
Independent Party Factions: Lista 909 - 909; Crecer – 1199; Libres – 980; Compromiso Republicano Independiente – 9909; Icemos – 2026	Pablo Mieres b. 1959 (age 67); Montevideo	Lawyer; Minister of Labour and Social Welfare (2020–2024) See more: 2004, 2009, 2014 and 2019 presidential candidate under the Independent Party; Senator of the Republic (2015–2020); National Representative for Montevideo (2000–2005); Dean of the Faculty of Social Sciences of the UdelaR (1998–1999)	(Lista 909)	Mónica Bottero	Journalist; Director of the National Institute for Women of the MIDES (2020–present) See more: 2019 vice presidential candidate under the Independent Party	(Crecer)

==== Parties without parliamentary representation ====
Party	Presidential candidate			Vice Presidential candidate		
Party	Name Birth date and place	Prior experience	Party faction	Name (Party sector)	Prior experience	Party faction
Popular Assembly Factions: Unidad Popular; Movimiento 26 de Marzo – 326; Partido Humanista – 1696; Partido Comunista Revolucionario – 960; MoDeJu – 3060; Movimiento AVANZAR – 13013; Partido de los Trabajadores – 1917; Frente de Trabajadores en Lucha – 565	Gonzalo Martínez b. 1989 (age 37); Montevideo	Student; Substitute National Representative for Montevideo (2015–2020)	(March 26 Movement)	Andrea Revuelta	Teacher; Union member of the ADES	(Workers' Party)
Sovereign Identity Factions: Nosotros Mismos – 18010	Gustavo Salle b. 1958 (age 68); Montevideo	Lawyer; 2019 presidential candidate under the Green Animalist Party	(Nosotros Mismos)	María Canoniero (N/A)	School Teacher	(Nosotros Mismos)
Environmental Constitutional Party Factions: Lista 1187 – 1187	Eduardo Lust b. 1959 (age 67); Paysandú	Constitutional Law professor National Representative (2020–present)	(Lista 1187)	Luján Criado	N/A; N/A	(Lista 1187)
For Necessary Changes Factions: Lista 2018 – 2018	Guillermo Franchi b. na Montevideo	Agronomist	(Lista 2018)	Virginia Vaz (N/A)	Architect; 2021 candidate for Director of the BPS representing retirees	(Lista 2018)
Republican Advance Party Factions: Avanzar – 937; Partido Digital – 678	Martín Pérez Banchero b. 1976 (age 50); Colonia	Lawyer; National Director of Tourism at the Ministry of Tourism (2020–2021)	(Avanzar)	Daniel Isi	N/A; N/A	(Avanzar)

==== Disqualified before the first round ====
Parties that did not manage to gather the minimum required of 251 delegates in their National Convention before August 31 to approve their presidential ticket.

Party	Presidential candidate			Vice Presidential candidate		
Party	Name Birth date and place	Prior experience	Party faction	Name (Party sector)	Prior experience	Party faction
Green Animalist Party Factions: Desafío – 409; EcoVida – 669	Rita Rodríguez b. na na	Philosophy professor	(Desafío)	Agustín Helal	N/A; N/A	(Desafío)

==== Withdrew after the primaries ====
Party	Presidential candidate			Vice Presidential candidate			Withdraw	
Party	Name Birth date and place	Prior experience	Party faction	Name (Party sector)	Prior experience	Party faction	Date	Reason
Enough is Enough Party Factions: Basta Ya Uruguay – 39	Jorge Bonica b. 1953 (age 70) Montevideo	Journalist; Director of El Bocón newspaper	(Basta Ya Uruguay)	Not announced			August 9	Logistical and financial difficulties in carrying out the electoral campaign and convening their National Convention.
Republican Coalition Factions: Lista 3002 – 3002; Partido Nacional; Partido Colorado; Cabildo Abierto; Partido de la Gente; Partido Independiente	Juan Carlos Otormín b. na Montevideo	Parliamentary reporter	(Lista 3002)	Not announced			August 18	It was actually a technicallity so to be able to use this party on the municipal elections, but it was not intended to participate in 2024.

=== Defeated in the primary elections ===
Party	Name Birth date and place	Prior experience
Libertarian Party	Nelson Petkovich b. na	N/A
Alternative Homeland	Javier Sciuto b. na	N/A
Harmony Party	Ruben Martínez b. na	N/A
Devolución	Pablo Paiva b. na	N/A

== Campaign slogans ==
Candidate	Party	Original slogan English translation	Ref
Yamandú Orsi	Broad Front	El frente es amplio "The front is broad"	
Álvaro Delgado	National Party	Reelegí un buen gobierno "Re-elect a good government"	
Andrés Ojeda	Colorado Party	El nuevo presidente "The new president"	
Guido Manini Ríos	Open Cabildo	A lo seguro "Playing safe"	
Pablo Mieres	Independent Party	De acá, para arriba "From here, upwards"	
Gonzalo Martínez	Popular Assembly	Sumate a construir la izquierda que lucha "Join us in building the left that fights"	
Gustavo Salle	Identidad Soberana	Trinchera de los valores "Bastion of values"	
Eduardo Lust	Constitutional Environmentalist Party	Tu voz al parlamento "Your voice in Parliament"	
Martín Pérez Banchero	Partido Avanzar Republicano	Para avanzar hay que cambiar "To move forward, we must change"	

== Endorsements ==
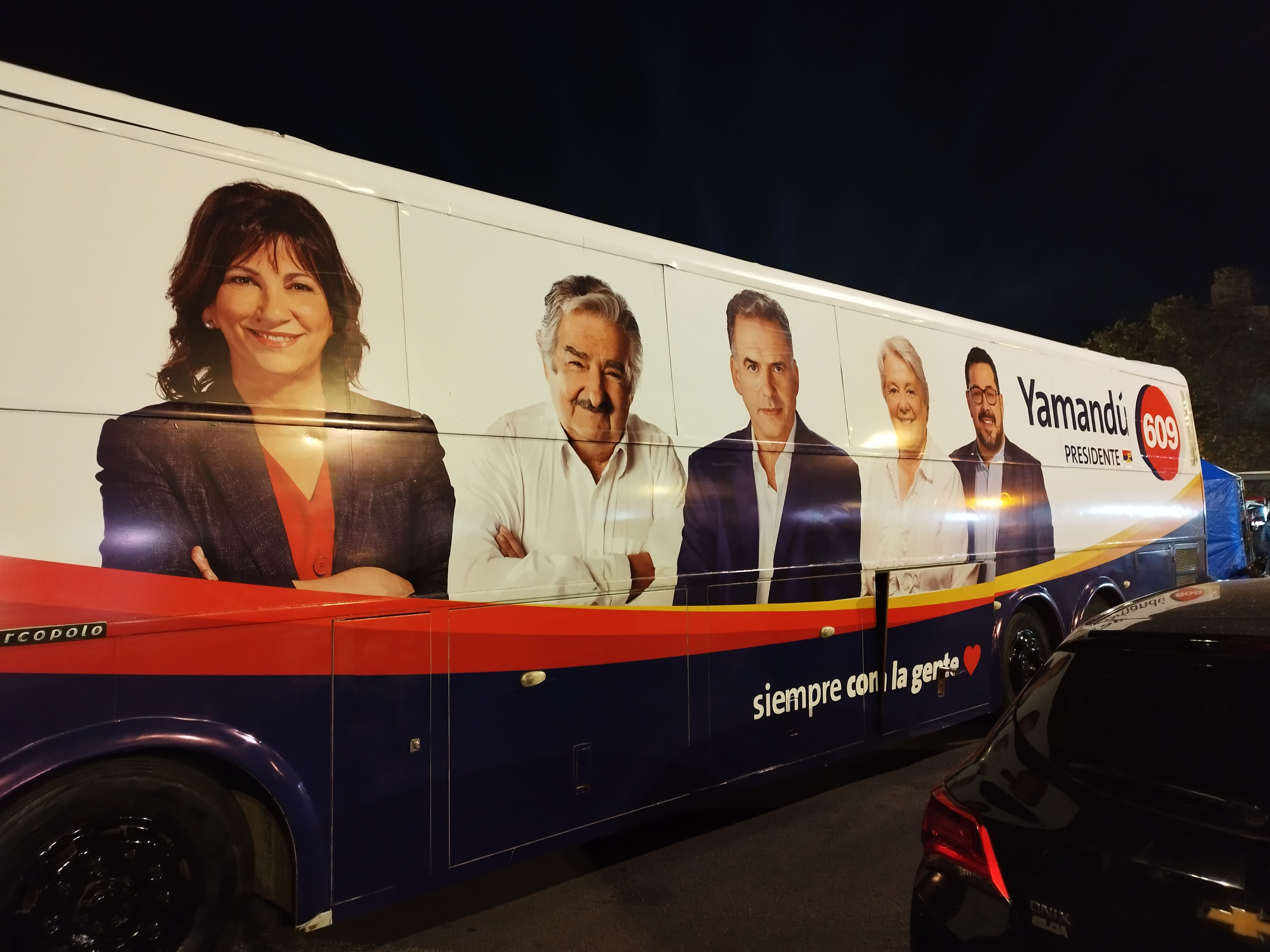
Pro-Orsi themed bus on the streets on Montevideo, October 2024.

Yamandú Orsi was endorsed by former president José Mujica, who rarely made appearances during the campaign due to his treatment against cancer. Following her defeat in the national primaries, pre-candidate Laura Raffo joined the list 40 of the National Party, with Álvaro Delgado. Following the first round, Andrés Ojeda expressed his support for Álvaro Delgado and the National Party.

== Opinion polls ==

=== Party polling after primaries ===
Polling firm	Fieldwork date	Sample size	FA Orsi	PN Delgado	PC Ojeda	CA Manini	PERI Vega	PI Mieres	UP Martínez	IS Salle	PCA Lust	Others	Und.	Blank/Abs.	Lead
General election	27 Oct 2024	–	46.12%	28.20%	16.89%	2.61%	0.4%	1.8%	0.4%	2.8%	0.5%	0.2%	—N/a	4.9%	18.1%
Opción Consultores	17–23 Oct 2024	1,218	45%	24%	16%	4%	—N/a	1%	—N/a	4%	—N/a	2%	4%		21%
UPC	18–22 Oct 2024	500	47%	25%	16%	3%	—N/a	1%	—N/a	—N/a	—N/a	4%	4%		22%
Factum	16–22 Oct 2024	900	45.5%	25.1%	15.0%	4.1%	—N/a	2.5%	0.7%	2.9%	—N/a	0.6%	—N/a	3.6%	20.4%
Equipos Consultores	8–22 Oct 2024	2,327	41.4%	20.2%	16.1%	1.6%	0.9%	2.0%	—N/a	1.9%	—N/a	0.7%	11.5%	3.7%	21.2%
Cifra	11–20 Oct 2024	1,000	44%	23%	15%	3%	—N/a	2%	—N/a	2%	—N/a	1%	2%	8%	21%
MPC Consultores	7–11 Oct 2024	1,200	37%	20%	17%	5%	1%	1%	—N/a	2%	1%	1%	15%		17%
Factum	28 Sep–6 Oct 2024	900	44%	24%	17%	4%	—N/a	3%	1%	3%	—N/a	1%	—N/a	3%	20%
Opción Consultores	23 Sep–3 Oct 2024	1,232	42%	24%	12%	3%	—N/a	2%	—N/a	2%	—N/a	1%	14%		18%
UPC	27–30 Sep 2024	500	46%	24%	13%	2%	—N/a	1%	—N/a	—N/a	—N/a	3%	11%		22%
Cifra	13–26 Sep 2024	1,001	44%	24%	14%	2%	—N/a	1%	—N/a	1%	—N/a	1%	13%		20%
Equipos Consultores	11–23 Sep 2024	2,000	43%	21%	15%	3%	—N/a	1%	1%	1%	—N/a	—N/a	10%	5%	22%
MPC Consultores	10–15 Sep 2024	1,260	34%	19%	15%	5%	1%	1%	—N/a	1%	1%	1%	19%	3%	15%
Factum	31 Aug–9 Sep 2024	900	44%	27%	15%	4%	—N/a	3%	—N/a	—N/a	—N/a	3%	—N/a	4%	17%
UPC	29 Aug–1 Sep 2024	500	47%	24%	13%	2%	—N/a	1%	—N/a	—N/a	—N/a	2%	6%	5%	23%
Equipos Consultores	14 Aug–1 Sep 2024	2,000	41%	22%	13%	3%	1%	—N/a	—N/a	1%	—N/a	1%	13%	3%	19%
Cifra	16–27 Aug 2024	1,003	44%	28%	11%	3%	—N/a	1%	—N/a	1%	—N/a	1%	11%		16%
Opción Consultores	15–27 Aug 2024	1,200	43%	23%	14%	4%	1%	1%	—N/a	1%	—N/a	1%	13%		20%
MPC Consultores	1–10 Aug 2024	1,160	33%	20%	14%	7%	—N/a	—N/a	—N/a	—N/a	—N/a	4%	19%	3%	13%
Factum	28 Jul–8 Aug 2024	900	44%	26%	15%	5%	1%	3%	1%	1%	—N/a	1%	—N/a	3%	18%
Nómade	29 Jul–4 Aug 2024	1,730	46.1%	25.3%	9.7%	1.3%	—N/a	—N/a	—N/a	—N/a	—N/a	2.6%	9.4%	5.6%	20.8%
Equipos Consultores	17–30 Jul 2024	1,207	43%	22%	11%	3%	—N/a	1%	—N/a	1%	—N/a	1%	15%	3%	21%
Cifra	17–28 Jul 2024	1,003	45%	27%	9%	3%	—N/a	1%	—N/a	1%	—N/a	1%	13%		18%
Opción Consultores	15–25 Jul 2024	1,000	42%	20%	13%	4%	1%	2%	—N/a	1%	—N/a	1%	16%		22%
MPC Consultores	10–14 Jul 2024	1,000	33%	23%	9%	7%	—N/a	—N/a	—N/a	—N/a	—N/a	3%	22%	3%	10%
UPC	5–9 Jul 2024	500	48%	24%	11%	2%	—N/a	1%	—N/a	—N/a	—N/a	3%	5%	6%	24%

=== Party polling before primaries ===
Polling firm	Fieldwork date	Sample size	FA	PN	PC	CA	PERI	PG	PI	Others	Und.	Blank/Abs.	Lead
Presidential primaries	30 Jun 2024	–	42.4%	33.4%	10.5%	1.8%	0.1%	—N/a	0.3%	1.4%	—N/a	0.6%	9.0%
Nómade	13–22 Jun 2024	1,124	43.6%	31.5%	8.1%	2.2%	—N/a	—N/a	—N/a	4.0%	6.0%	4.6%	12.1%
Equipos Consultores	29 May–13 Jun 2024	1,413	44%	26%	9%	3%	—N/a	—N/a	1%	1%	12%	4%	18%
Factum	1–11 Jun 2024	900	43%	30%	12%	5%	—N/a	—N/a	3%	3% (Note: 1% for Popular Unity)	—N/a	4%	13%
Opción Consultores	15–31 May 2024	1,420	42%	27%	7%	4%	1%	—N/a	1%	1%	10%	6%	15%
Cifra	16–29 May 2024	1,501	47%	32%	7%	3%	—N/a	—N/a	1%	10%			15%
UPC	24–28 May 2024	500	47%	29%	7%	1%	1%	—N/a	—N/a	3%	6%	6%	18%
MPC Consultores	20–25 May 2024	900	33%	23%	8%	8%	1%	—N/a	1%	3% (Note: 1% for Constitutional Environmentalist Party and 1% for Sovereign Identity)	20%	4%	10%
Factum	19–30 Apr 2024	900	43%	30%	10%	6%	—N/a	—N/a	2%	4% (Note: 2% for Popular Unity)	—N/a	5%	13%
Nómade	25–29 Apr 2024	1,076	41.5%	32.3%	4.2%	3.1%	1.4%	—N/a	—N/a	2.7%	14.3%	0.5%	9.2%
Equipos Consultores	11–28 Apr 2024	1,402	43%	29%	7%	3%	—N/a	—N/a	—N/a	2%	12%	4%	14%
UPC	19–23 Apr 2024	500	45%	29%	7%	2%	1%	—N/a	1%	2%	6%	7%	16%
Cifra	11–22 Apr 2024	1,000	45%	32%	7%	3%	—N/a	—N/a	1%	12%			13%
Nómade	10–14 Apr 2024	1,042	46.5%	32.9%	4.7%	2.4%	—N/a	—N/a	0.8%	6.0%	6.6%	—N/a	13.6%
Opción Consultores	1–10 Apr 2024	1,231	43%	28%	8%	3%	—N/a	—N/a	1%	2%	9%	6%	15%
MPC Consultores	18–23 Mar 2024	900	34%	23%	7%	9%	1%	—N/a	1%	3%	19%	3%	11%
Cifra	7–20 Mar 2024	1,198	46%	32%	7%	3%	—N/a	—N/a	1%	11%			14%
Factum	20 Feb–2 Mar 2024	900	43%	29%	8%	7%	—N/a	—N/a	3%	6%	—N/a	4%	14%
Opción Consultores	14–28 Feb 2024	800	41%	31%	6%	3%	1%	—N/a	1%	1%	10%	7%	10%
Equipos Consultores	15–27 Feb 2024	1,400	42%	27%	7%	4%	—N/a	—N/a	—N/a	2%	13%	5%	15%
Cifra	1–17 Feb 2024	1,001	47%	31%	6%	2%	—N/a	2% (Note: Unspecified or other Multicolor parties)	1%	11%			16%
MPC Consultores	29 Jan–2 Feb 2024	960	34%	22%	6%	10%	1%	—N/a	2%	3%	19%	3%	12%
Nómade	22 Jan–2 Feb 2024	839	40.6%	29.7%	4.2%	2.3%	1.3%	—N/a	—N/a	3.3% (Note: 1.1% for Constitutional Environmentalist Party)	17.8%	0.8%	10.9%
MPC Consultores	15–20 Dec 2023	900	33%	20%	7%	8%	—N/a	—N/a	—N/a	4%	24%	4%	13%
Factum	17–30 Nov 2023	900	42%	26%	9%	7%	—N/a	—N/a	3%	5%	5%	3%	16%
Equipos Consultores	16–29 Nov 2023	1,204	45%	29%	7%	2%	—N/a	—N/a	—N/a	2%	12%	3%	16%
Opción Consultores	4–20 Nov 2023	800	44%	30%	6%	3%	1%	—N/a	3%	—N/a	7%	6%	14%
UPC	10–14 Nov 2023	500	45%	27%	5%	3%	1%	2%		2%	7%	8%	18%
Nómade	6–11 Nov 2023	975	41.6%	23.0%	4.3%	3.7%	—N/a	—N/a	1.1%	1.8%	23.3%	1.2%	18.6%
Cifra	17 Oct–3 Nov 2023	1,002	44%	31%	6%	2%	—N/a	1%	1%	15%			13%
Equipos Consultores	5–18 Oct 2023	1,204	40%	29%	4%	2%	1%	—N/a	—N/a	1%	17%	6%	11%
UPC	15–19 Sep 2023	400	45%	29%	6%	3%	0%	1%	1%	2%	6%	7%	16%
Factum	21 Aug–6 Sep 2023	900	41%	28%	7%	8%	—N/a	—N/a	3%	3%	8%	2%	13%
Cifra	17–31 Aug 2023	1,000	42%	30%	4%	2%	—N/a	—N/a	1%	21%			12%
Equipos Consultores	10–23 Aug 2023	1,204	43%	26%	7%	3%	1%	—N/a	1%	1%	15%	3%	17%
Nómade	19–23 Jul 2023	902	40.6%	25.9%	3.6%	3.9%	—N/a	—N/a	1.1%	0.9%	22.3%	1.7%	14.7%
Cifra	15 Jun–2 Jul 2023	1,009	44%	27%	6%	2%	—N/a	2%	1%	18%			17%
Factum	21–28 Jun 2023	900	40%	26%	9%	7%	—N/a	—N/a	4%	4%	7%	3%	14%
Equipos Consultores	2–16 Jun 2023	1,207	43%	28%	7%	2%	1%	—N/a	1%	1%	12%	5%	15%
UPC	2–6 Jun 2023	400	45%	29%	5%	4%	—N/a	—N/a	1%	3%	7%	6%	16%
Opción Consultores	15–22 May 2023	849	42%	30%	4%	4%	1%	—N/a	1%	1%	11%	6%	12%
Factum	24 Apr–11 May 2023	900	41%	23%	8%	11%	—N/a	—N/a	4%	3%	7%	3%	18%
Cifra	20 Apr–3 May 2023	987	41%	30%	3%	4%	—N/a	2%	1%	19%			11%
Equipos Consultores	11–24 Apr 2023	1,204	42%	28%	5%	2%	—N/a	—N/a	1%	—N/a	15%	7%	14%
Nómade	3–17 Apr 2023	803	43.7%	29.0%	4.3%	5.3%	—N/a	—N/a	2.1%	0.8%	12.5%	2.3%	14.7%
Latinobarómetro	2–28 Mar 2023	1,200	34.9%	24.9%	2.6%	0.7%	0.2%	0.1%	0.2%	1.7%	18.4%	16.3%	10%
Cifra	15–27 Feb 2023	1,007	43%	30%	3%	2%	—N/a	2%	1%	19%			13%
Factum	11–20 Feb 2023	1,000	41%	26%	6%	9%	—N/a	—N/a	4%	4%	7%	3%	15%
Equipos Consultores	Feb 2023	–	43%	24%	9%	3%	—N/a	1%	1%	1%	n/a	n/a	19%
Nómade	3–17 Jan 2023	828	43.1%	27.8%	4.9%	6.5%	0.6%	0.6%	0.8%	0.3% (Note: 0.3% for Green Animalist Party)	14.1%	1.3%	15.3%
Equipos Consultores	Dec 2022	–	44%	23%	6%	4%	1%	—N/a	—N/a	1%	16%	5%	21%
Opción Consultores	2–10 Nov 2022	–	40%	28%	6%	5%	1%	—N/a	1%	1%	12%	6%	12%
Cifra	20–31 Oct 2022	810	43%	31%	4%	2%	—N/a	1%	1%	18%			12%
Factum	4–16 Oct 2022	800	41%	27%	8%	8%	—N/a	—N/a	3%	3%	7%	3%	14%
Equipos Consultores	24 Jul–8 Oct 2022	1,900	38%	28%	5%	3%	1%	—N/a	1%	2%	20%	5%	10%
Factum	3–13 Jun 2022	900	39%	28%	8%	8%	—N/a	—N/a	3%	3%	7%	4%	11%
Equipos Consultores	23 Apr–7 May 2022	1,195	35%	25%	5%	2%	—N/a	—N/a	—N/a	1%	25%	7%	10%
Factum	6–15 Nov 2021	900	39%	30%	8%	9%	—N/a	1%	2%	2%	7%	2%	9%
Equipos Consultores	Jul–Sep 2021	1,500	35%	30%	4%	3%	—N/a	—N/a	1%	1%	19%	7%	5%
Opción Consultores	13–20 May 2021	824	34%	33%	5%	5%	1%	—N/a	1%	2%	11%	8%	1%
2019 election, 1st round	27 October 2019	–	39.0%	28.6%	12.3%	11.0%	1.4%	1.1%	1.0%	1.9%	—N/a	3.6%	10.4%

=== Party polling with hypothetical presidential candidates ===
Polling firm	Fieldwork date	Sample size	FA		PN		PC	CA	PERI	PI	Lead
Polling firm	Fieldwork date	Sample size	Orsi	Cosse	Delgado	Raffo	PC	CA	PERI	PI	Lead
Equipos Consultores	15–27 Feb 2024	1,400	44%	—N/a	26%	—N/a	5%	9%	—N/a	2%	18%
Equipos Consultores	15–27 Feb 2024	1,400	45%	—N/a	—N/a	22%	8%	10%	—N/a	3%	23%
Equipos Consultores	15–27 Feb 2024	1,400	—N/a	37%	30%	—N/a	6%	10%	—N/a	2%	7%
Equipos Consultores	15–27 Feb 2024	1,400	—N/a	37%	—N/a	21%	10%	11%	—N/a	5%	16%
Opción Consultores	14–28 Feb 2024	800	40%	—N/a	33%	—N/a	4%	5%	1%	3%	7%
Opción Consultores	14–28 Feb 2024	800	—N/a	39%	35%	—N/a	6%	5%	1%	3%	4%
Equipos Consultores	16–29 Nov 2023	1,204	47%	—N/a	29%	—N/a	5%	7%	—N/a	3%	18%
Equipos Consultores	16–29 Nov 2023	1,204	46%	—N/a	—N/a	24%	8%	8%	—N/a	4%	22%
Equipos Consultores	16–29 Nov 2023	1,204	—N/a	42%	31%	—N/a	7%	7%	—N/a	4%	11%
Equipos Consultores	16–29 Nov 2023	1,204	—N/a	42%	—N/a	24%	10%	7%	—N/a	5%	18%
Opción Consultores	4–20 Nov 2023	800	45%	—N/a	27%	—N/a	8%	6%	1%	4%	18%
Opción Consultores	4–20 Nov 2023	800	—N/a	39%	31%	—N/a	6%	6%	1%	6%	8%
Equipos Consultores	2–16 Jun 2023	1,207	46%	—N/a	26%	—N/a	11%	5%	—N/a	4%	20%
Equipos Consultores	2–16 Jun 2023	1,207	46%	—N/a	—N/a	20%	13%	7%	—N/a	4%	26%
Equipos Consultores	2–16 Jun 2023	1,207	—N/a	39%	25%	—N/a	13%	6%	—N/a	6%	14%
Equipos Consultores	2–16 Jun 2023	1,207	—N/a	41%	—N/a	21%	16%	7%	—N/a	5%	20%
Opción Consultores	23 May–1 Jun 2022	800	40%	—N/a	22%	—N/a	12%	8%	1%	3%	18%
Opción Consultores	23 May–1 Jun 2022	800	—N/a	39%	23%	—N/a	13%	9%	2%	3%	16%

=== Presidential polling with hypothetical candidates ===
Polling firm	Fieldwork date	Sample size	FA				PN				PC		CA		Other	Und.	Blank/ Abs.
Polling firm	Fieldwork date	Sample size	Orsi	Cosse	Bergara	Other FA	Delgado	Raffo	Argimón	Other PN	Bordaberry	Other PC	Manini	Other CA	Other	Und.	Blank/ Abs.
Presidential primaries	30 Jun 2024	–	25.1%	15.9%	—N/a	1.3%	24.9%	6.4%	—N/a	2.1%	—N/a	10.5% (Note: 4.1% for Andrés Ojeda Spitz)	1.8%	—N/a	1.8%	—N/a	0.6%
Cifra	1–17 Feb 2024	1,001	24%	11%	1%	2%	18%	6%	—N/a	2% (Note: 1% for Jorge Gandini and 1% for Juan Sartori)	—N/a	1% (Note: 1% for Robert Silva)	2%	—N/a	2% (Note: A different Multicolor candidate)	30%	—N/a
Cifra	17 Oct–3 Nov 2023	1,002	20%	9%	1%	5%	12%	4%	1%	4% (Note: 1% for Jorge Gandini)	—N/a	1%	3%	—N/a	1%	38%	—N/a
Cifra	17–31 Aug 2023	1,000	23%	8%	1%	5%	12%	4%	1%	3%	2%	—N/a	3%	—N/a	1%	37%	—N/a
Cifra	15 Jun–2 Jul 2023	1,009	20%	12%	1%	7%	10%	5%	1%	3%	3%	—N/a	2%	—N/a	1%	35%	—N/a
Cifra	20 Apr–3 May 2023	987	22%	10%	1%	4%	13%	4%	1%	3%	2%	—N/a	4%	—N/a	2%	34%	—N/a
Nómade	3–17 Apr 2023	803	17.2%	11.2%	0.7%	0.7% (Note: 0.7% for Óscar Andrade)	5.7%	0.6%	—N/a	5.3% (Note: 5.3% of respondents named incumbent president Luis Lacalle Pou, who is ineligible for re-election)	0.9%	—N/a	4.0%	—N/a	4.5%	45.9%	3.3%
Cifra	4–14 Aug 2022	704	17.5%	8.9%	—N/a	9.9%	9.6%	2.7%	1.3%	7.7% (Note: 7.7% of respondents named incumbent president Luis Lacalle Pou, who is ineligible for re-election)	3.0%	—N/a	2.8%	—N/a	2.8%	33.8%	—N/a
Opción Consultores	23 May–1 Jun 2022	800	9%	6%	(Note: included with other FA)	8%	5%	(Note: included with other FN)	1%	3%	2%	2%	3%	1%	1%	62%	—N/a

=== Second round ===
Polling firm	Fieldwork date	Sample size	FA		PN		Und.	Blank/ Abs.	Lead
Polling firm	Fieldwork date	Sample size	Orsi	Cosse	Delgado	Raffo	Und.	Blank/ Abs.	Lead
UPC	18–22 Oct 2024	500	49%	—N/a	41%	—N/a	10%		8%
Opción Consultores	23 Sep–3 Oct 2024	1,232	48%	—N/a	41%	—N/a	5%	6%	7%
UPC	27–30 Sep 2024	500	50%	—N/a	40%	—N/a	10%		10%
UPC	29 Aug–1 Sep 2024	500	49%	—N/a	39%	—N/a	12%		10%
Opción Consultores	15–27 Aug 2024	1,200	48%	—N/a	41%	—N/a	4%	7%	7%
Factum	28 Jul–8 Aug 2024	900	50%	—N/a	46%	—N/a	—N/a	4%	4%
Nómade	29 Jul–4 Aug 2024	1,730	51.5%	—N/a	34.2%	—N/a	7.4%	6.9%	17.3%
Opción Consultores	15–25 Jul 2024	1,000	50%	—N/a	38%	—N/a	6%	7%	12%
MPC Consultores	10–14 Jul 2024	1,000	36%	—N/a	39%	—N/a	20%	5%	3%
MPC Consultores	20–25 May 2024	900	43–48% (Note: Generic FA candidate)		47–52% (Note: Generic Multicolor candidate)		—N/a	3–5%	2%
Cifra	16–28 May 2024	1,503	50%	—N/a	39%	—N/a	11%	—N/a	11%
Cifra	16–28 May 2024	1,503	—N/a	45%	45%	—N/a	10%	—N/a	Tie
Nómade	10–14 Apr 2024	1,042	53.4%	—N/a	46.6%	—N/a	—N/a	—N/a	7%
Nómade	10–14 Apr 2024	1,042	—N/a	48.7%	51.3%	—N/a	—N/a	—N/a	17%
Equipos Consultores	15–27 Feb 2024	1,400	48%	—N/a	41%	—N/a	7%	4%	7%
Equipos Consultores	15–27 Feb 2024	1,400	52%	—N/a	—N/a	35%	8%	5%	17%
Equipos Consultores	15–27 Feb 2024	1,400	—N/a	42%	44%	—N/a	8%	6%	2%
Equipos Consultores	15–27 Feb 2024	1,400	—N/a	42%	—N/a	39%	9%	10%	3%

== Results ==
As a result of the high number of small parties not meeting the electoral threshold to obtain representation in the Senate, the Broad Front won 16 of the 30 seats despite not achieving a majority of the valid votes. On the other hand, no coalition secured a majority in the Chamber of Representatives. The blank and invalid votes represented almost 5% and more than 100,000 votes, a record high.

Party	Presidential candidate	First round		Second round		Seats			
Party	Presidential candidate	Votes	%	Votes	%	Chamber	+/–	Senate	+/–
Broad Front	Yamandú Orsi	1,071,826	46.12	1,212,833	52.00	48	+6	16	+3
National Party	Álvaro Delgado	655,426	28.20	1,119,537	48.00	29	–1	9	–1
Colorado Party	Andrés Ojeda	392,592	16.89			17	+4	5	+1
Sovereign Identity	Gustavo Salle	65,796	2.83			2	New	0	New
Open Cabildo	Guido Manini Ríos	60,549	2.61			2	–9	0	–3
Independent Party	Pablo Mieres	41,618	1.79			1	0	0	0
Environmental Constitutional Party	Eduardo Lust	11,865	0.51			0	New	0	New
Popular Assembly	Gonzalo Martínez	10,102	0.43			0	New	0	New
Partido Ecologista Radical Intransigente	César Vega	9,281	0.40			0	–1	0	0
For Necessary Changes	Guillermo Franchi	3,183	0.14			0	New	0	New
Republican Advance Party	Martín Pérez Banchero	1,909	0.08			0	New	0	New
Total		2,324,147	100.00	2,332,370	100.00	99	0	30	0
Valid votes		2,324,147	95.11	2,332,370	95.72				
Invalid votes		52,750	2.16	64,654	2.65				
Blank votes		66,739	2.73	39,542	1.62				
Total votes		2,443,636	100.00	2,436,566	100.00				
Registered voters/turnout		2,727,120	89.61	2,727,120	89.35				
Source: Corte Electoral (First Round) Corte Electoral (Second Round) El Observador (Chamber and Senate)

=== By department ===
First round & parliamentary election
Constituency	Broad Front			National Party			Colorado Party			Sovereign Identity			Open Cabildo			Independent Party			Others (Note: Parties which gained no parliamentary representation: Popular Unity, Green Animalist Party, Digital Party, Workers' Party.)		Valid votes		Invalid votes	
Constituency	Votes	%	D	Votes	%	D	Votes	%	D	Votes	%	D	Votes	%	D	Votes	%	D	Votes	%	Votes	%	Votes	%
Artigas	17,630	32.8	1	21,615	40.2	1	9,768	18.2	0	804	1.5	0	3,226	6.0	0	275	0.5	0	367	0.7	53,685	95.7	2,429	4.3
Canelones	190,715	52.1	8	90,464	24.7	4	55,981	15.3	3	10,502	2.9	1	7,874	2.2	1	4,756	1.3	0	5,878	1.6	366,170	94.1	22,928	5.9
Cerro Largo	21,875	33.9	1	29,645	46.0	1	8,357	13.0	0	1,417	2.2	0	2,094	3.2	0	445	0.7	0	675	1.0	64,508	95.9	67,283	4.1
Colonia	37,157	40.0	1	33,339	35.9	1	16,195	17.4	1	2,072	2.2	0	1,455	1.6	0	1,296	1.4	0	1,395	1.5	92,909	95.0	4,874	5.0
Durazno	16,353	36.6	1	15,774	35.2	1	9,553	21.4	0	976	2.2	0	1,076	2.4	0	421	0.9	0	573	1.3	44,726	95.4	2,172	4.6
Flores	5,643	28.4	1	8,843	44.6	1	4,303	21.7	0	353	1.8	0	311	1.6	0	190	1.0	0	206	0.9	19,848	95.8	867	4.2
Florida	19,782	38.9	1	18,265	36.0	1	9,427	18.6	0	1,272	2.5	0	731	1.4	0	650	1.3	0	675	1.3	50,802	95.1	2,620	4.9
Lavalleja	14,245	32.5	1	14,958	34.2	1	11,127	25.4	0	1,259	2.9	0	1,072	2.4	0	468	1.1	0	1,130	2.6	43,791	94.2	2,678	5.8
Maldonado	45,719	35.0	2	49,038	37.5	2	23,559	18.0	1	4,687	3.6	0	3,108	2.4	0	2,175	1.7	0	2,311	1.8	130,597	94.4	7,765	5.6
Montevideo	470,349	54.3	22	186,075	20.5	8	119,305	13.2	5	27,354	3.2	1	21,455	2.5	1	26,389	3.0	1	15,914	1.8	866,841	95.6	39,653	4.4
Paysandú	34,641	41.7	1	30,512	36.7	1	12,386	14.9	1	2,234	2.7	0	1,408	1.7	0	477	0.6	0	1,404	1.7	83,062	95.1	4,275	4.9
Rio Negro	17,346	43.5	1	11,333	28.4	1	8,446	21.2	0	1,090	2.7	0	1,052	2.6	0	270	0.7	0	341	0.8	39,878	94.9	2,149	5.1
Rivera	20,572	27.2	1	20,298	26.8		27,524	36.4	1	1,537	2.0	0	4,556	6.0	0	453	0.6	0	665	0.9	75,605	95.5	3,537	4.5
Rocha	23,232	41.5	1	17,995	32.2	1	10,150	18.1	0	1,915	3.4	0	1,244	2.2	0	429	0.8	0	962	1.7	55,927	93.9	3,631	6.1
Salto	39,893	43.6	1	24,785	27.1		19,042	20.8	1	1,859	2.0	0	3,966	4.3	0	818	0.9	0	967	1.1	91,330	96.0	3,758	4.0
San Jose	33,841	44.5	1	23,440	31.2	1	12,782	17.0	0	1,745	2.3	0	1,426	1.9	0	847	1.1	0	1,136	1.5	75,217	94.4	4,453	5.6
Soriano	25,738	40.5	1	21,231	33.4	1	11,656	18.3	1	2,001	3.1	0	1,506	2.4	0	459	0.7	0	1,002	1.6	63,593	95.1	3,292	4.9
Tacuarembó	24,500	35.5	1	22,134	32.1	1	17,165	24.5	1	1,615	2.3	0	2,158	3.1	0	599	0.9	0	803	1.2	68,974	94.8	3,728	5.2
Treinta y Tres	12,478	34.3	1	15,630	43.0	1	5,788	15.9	0	1,098	3.0	0	819	2.2	0	198	0.5	0	399	1.1	36,410	94.6	2,089	5.4
Total	1,071,709	46.1	48	655,374	28.2	29	392,514	16.9	17	65,790	2.8	2	60,537	2.6	2	41,615	1.8	1	36,334	1.5	2,323,873	95.1	119,673	4.9
Source: Corte Electoral

Second round
Constituency	Broad Front		National Party		Valid votes		Invalid votes	
Constituency	Votes	%	Votes	%	Votes	%	Votes	%
Artigas	23,041	43.0	30,548	57.0				
Canelones	209,462	56.4	161,631	43.6				
Cerro Largo	28,914	45.0	35,377	55.0				
Colonia	42,414	45.3	51,270	54.7				
Durazno	20,532	45.6	24,445	54.3				
Flores	7,570	38.3	12,173	61.7				
Florida	23,698	46.6	27,110	53.4				
Lavalleja	17,502	39.8	26,449	60.2				
Maldonado	54,105	41.3	76,898	58.7				
Montevideo	508,730	58.5	360,355	41.5				
Paysandú	42,060	50.8	40,681	49.2				
Rio Negro	19,621	49.2	20,266	50.8				
Rivera	27,782	36.9	47,475	63.1				
Rocha	26,570	47.3	29,626	52.7				
Salto	45,991	50.4	45,185	49.6				
San Jose	38,303	50.5	37,584	49.5				
Soriano	30,949	48.6	32,734	51.4				
Tacuarembó	29,886	43.3	39,190	56.7				
Treinta y Tres	15,703	43.3	20,540	56.7				
Total	1,212,833	52.00	1,119,537	48.00				
Source: Corte Electoral (reporting: 100)

== Reactions ==
=== Domestic ===
Following the results of the second round, Delgado conceded defeat to Orsi, who pledged to be a president "who calls again and again for national dialogue to find the best solutions". Outgoing president Luis Lacalle Pou congratulated Orsi, who pledged to begin the presidential transition "as soon as I deem it appropriate".

=== International ===
- Argentina: The Ministry of Foreign Affairs issued a statement congratulating Orsi on his victory, as well as wishes to strengthen the ties between Argentina and Uruguay.
- Brazil: President Luiz Inácio Lula da Silva congratulated Orsi on his victory, as well as the electoral process.
- Colombia: President Gustavo Petro congratulated Orsi on his victory, who stated that "this victory reflects the will of the Latin American people for unity and change".
- Guatemala: President Bernardo Arévalo (who was born in Montevideo) congratulated Orsi on his victory, who stated that: "May the success of your government translate into the improvement of the material and spiritual conditions of the beloved Uruguayan people".
- Honduras: President Xiomara Castro congratulated Orsi on his victory, who said that "a clear victory that reaffirms the progressive and democratic trend in Latin America".
- Mexico: President Claudia Sheinbaum congratulated both Orsi and Cosse on their victories, as well as saying that the Uruguayan people "once again demonstrates its democratic and progressive vocation".
- Panama: President José Raúl Mulino congratulated Orsi and wished to strengthen the ties between Panama and Uruguay.
- Peru: The Ministry of Foreign Affairs issued a statement congratulating Orsi on his victory.
- Sahrawi Republic: President Brahim Ghali congratulated Orsi on his election and expressed his commitment to strengthening ties of friendship and cooperation between their nations.
- Spain: The Government of Spain issued a statement congratulating Orsi on his victory, and wished that "continue working with its authorities for the benefit of our peoples".
- United States: Outgoing President Joe Biden congratulated both Orsi and the Uruguayan people for "their unyielding commitment to democracy".
- Venezuela: President Nicolás Maduro congratulated Orsi on social media, and wished him "the greatest of successes".
