= Chamber of Representatives of Uruguay =

Lower house of the General Assembly of Uruguay

Coordinates: 34°53′28″S 56°11′14″W

Chamber of Representatives Cámara de Representantes
- 50th Legislature

Type
- Type: Lower house of the General Assembly of Uruguay

History
- Founded: 19 October 1830

Leadership
- President of the Chamber: Rodrigo Goñi Reyes, National Party since 1 March 2026

Structure
- Seats: 99
- Political groups: Government (48): Broad Front (48); Opposition (51): Republican Coalition (49); National Party (29); Colorado Party (17); Open Cabildo (2); Independent Party (1); Sovereign Identity (2)

Elections
- Voting system: Ley de lemas (D'Hondt method)
- Last election: 27 October 2024
- Next election: 27 October 2029

Meeting place
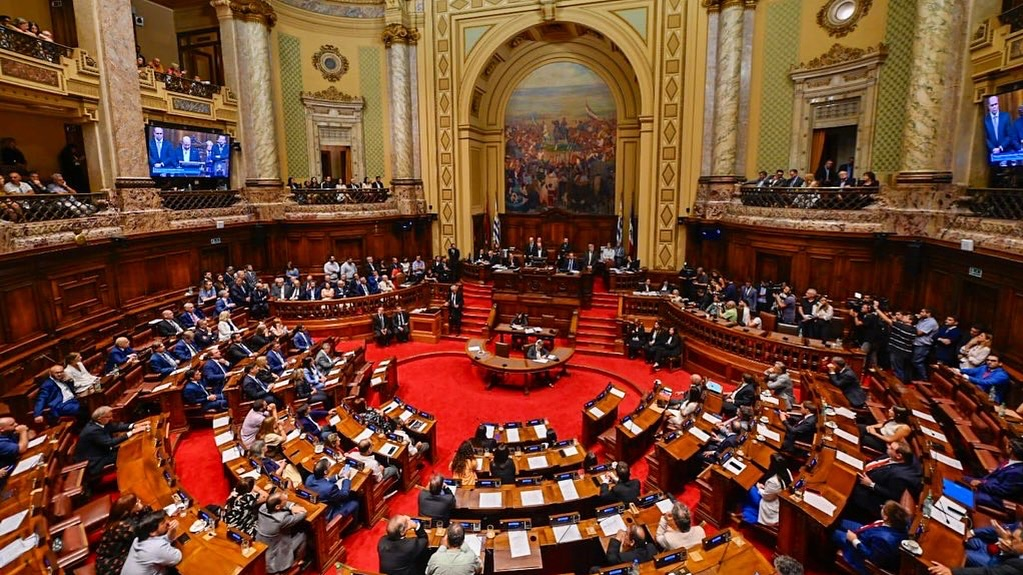
- Chamber of Representatives, Legislative Palace, Montevideo, Uruguay

Website
- Official website

The Chamber of Representatives (Spanish: Cámara de Representantes) is the lower house of the General Assembly of Uruguay (Asamblea General de Uruguay). The Chamber has 99 members, elected for a five-year term by proportional representation with at least two members per department.

The composition and powers of the Chamber of Representatives are established by Article Ninety of the Uruguayan Constitution. It also requires that members must be aged at least 25 and have been citizens of Uruguay for five years. It is the competence of the Chamber of Representatives to accuse in the Senate members of both houses, the President and Vice President of the Republic, the Ministers of State, the members of the Supreme Court, the Administrative Litigation Court, the Court of Accounts and the Electoral Court, either for violating the Constitution or other serious crimes.

== President ==
The Presidency of the Chamber is renewed at the beginning of each session. Every year, a Representative is elected by the rest of the members as its President. The current officeholder of the Chamber of Representatives is Sebastián Andújar, who took office on March 1, 2023.

== Historical seat division ==
=== 1989–1994 ===
39	30	21	9
National Party	Colorado Party	PDC	PP

=== 1994–1999 ===
32	31	31	5
Colorado Party	National Party	Broad Front	NS

=== 1999–2004 ===
40	33	22	4
Broad Front	Colorado Party	National Party	NS

=== 2004–2009 ===
52	36	10	1
Broad Front	National Party	Colorado	IP

=== 2009–2014 ===
50	30	17	2
Broad Front	National Party	Colorado Party	IP

=== 2014–2019 ===
50	32	13	3	1
Broad Front	National Party	Colorado Party	IP	PA

=== 2019–2024 ===
42	30	13	11	1	1	1
Broad Front	National Party	Colorado Party	Open Cabildo	IP	PG	PERI

=== 2024–2029 ===
48	29	17	2	2	1
Broad Front	National Party	Colorado Party	SI	Open Cabildo	IP

== See also ==
- General Assembly of Uruguay
- Chamber of Senators of Uruguay
- Elections in Uruguay
