= List of Uruguayan lawyers =

A list of notable Uruguayan lawyers:

- Alberto Abdala
- Pablo Abdala
- Washington Abdala
- Sergio Abreu
- Eduardo Acevedo Maturana
- Rafael Addiego Bruno
- Gonzalo Aguirre
- Luis Almagro
- Raúl Alonso de Marco
- Sofía Álvarez Vignoli
- José Amorín Batlle
- Alejandro Atchugarry

B

- Luis Barrios Tassano
- Hugo Batalla
- Jorge Batlle
- Washington Beltrán Barbat
- Washington Beltrán Mullin
- Azucena Berrutti
- Daniel Blanco Acevedo
- Juan Carlos Blanco Acevedo
- Juan Carlos Blanco Estradé
- Juan Carlos Blanco Fernández
- Domingo Bordaberry
- Pedro Bordaberry
- Sara Bossio
- Alfeo Brum
- Baltasar Brum

C

- Milton Cairoli
- Juan Campisteguy
- Diego Cánepa
- Lorenzo Carnelli
- Jorge Chediak
- Juan Vicente Chiarino
- Eduardo Juan Couture

D

- Alberto Demicheli
- Daniel Díaz Maynard
- Ramón Díaz (economist)
- Guillermo Domenech

E

- Martín Echegoyen
- José Eugenio Ellauri

F

- Pedro Figari
- Emilio Frugoni

G

- Héctor Grauert
- Julio César Grauert
- Héctor Gros Espiell

H

- Luis Alberto de Herrera

I

J

- Eduardo Jiménez de Aréchaga

L

- Luis Alberto Lacalle
- Luis Alberto Lacalle Pou
- Jorge Larrañaga
- Jorge Larrieux

M

- Alejandro Magariños Cervantes
- Carlos Maggi
- Antonio Marchesano
- Martín C. Martínez
- Tomás de Mattos
- Aparicio Méndez
- Pablo Mieres

N

O

- Didier Opertti
- Jorge Orrico

P

- Jorge Pacheco Klein
- Ope Pasquet

Q

- Carlos Quijano

R

- Juan Andrés Ramírez
- Siegbert Rippe
- Alba Roballo
- Hipólito Rodríguez Caorsi
- Eduardo Rodríguez Larreta
- Jorge Ruibal

S

- Julio María Sanguinetti
- Walter Santoro
- Enrique Sayagués Laso
- Héctor Martín Sturla
- Michelle Suárez Bértora

T

- Enrique Tarigo
- Pablo Troise

U

V

- Leslie van Rompaey

W

- Claudio Williman
- José Claudio Wílliman

Z

- Alberto Fermín Zubiría
- Alberto Zumarán
