= List of Lebanese people in Uruguay =

This is a list of notable individuals born in Uruguay of Lebanese ancestry (Lebanese Uruguayans) or people of Lebanese and Uruguayan dual nationality who live or lived in Uruguay.

== Arts ==
- Malena Muyala - tango singer
- Felipe Seade - painter
- Dahd Sfeir - actress
- Bárbara Mori - actress

== Politicians ==
- Alberto Abdala - politician, lawyer, painter, former Vice-President of Uruguay
- Carlos Abdala - politician and diplomat
- Pablo Abdala - politician and lawyer
- Washington Abdala - politician, lawyer, media pundit

== Writers ==
- Amir Hamed - writer and translator

== Judges ==
- Jorge Chediak - member of the Supreme Court

== See also ==
- Lebanon–Uruguay relations
- List of Lebanese people
- List of Lebanese people (Diaspora)
