= Arab Uruguayans =

Ethnic group

Arab Uruguayans Uruguayo árabe عرب أوروغواي
Total population
- over 100,000 descendants (6% of total population)

Regions with significant populations
- Montevideo, Chuy

Languages
- Uruguayan Spanish, Arabic

Religion
- Christians (majority) and Islam (minority)

Arab Uruguayans (Arabic: عرب أوروغواي) are residents or citizens of Uruguay of Arab ethnicity, whose ancestry predominantly traces back to any of various waves of immigrants from the Arab world, especially Lebanon and Syria.

== Overview ==
Arab Uruguayans originated mainly from what is now Lebanon (of which there may be over 80,000 descendants); a notable trend was immigration during Ottoman times; for this reason, Arab Uruguayans are traditionally (and wrongly) denominated "turcos" (Turks). There are also individuals from other Arab countries such as Egypt, Syria, Morocco and Palestine.

Most Uruguayans of Arabic descent are Christians (Maronites), with some Muslim minorities. There was also a small influx of Arab Jews, who have since lost their Arab cultural identity.

Arab Uruguayans are among the smallest Arab diaspora groups in the world. There are some 500 Arab-speaking people in the border towns of Chuy and Rivera.

Lately there are two noticeable trends:

- Syrian refugees who flee from the Syrian Civil War,
- Arab investors interested in Uruguay, who created the Uruguayan-Arab Chamber (in cooperation with the Gulf Cooperation Council).

== Notable people ==
- Alberto Abdala, Vice President of Uruguay 1967-1972, of Lebanese descent
- Washington Abdala, lawyer and politician, President of the Chamber of Deputies (2000), of Lebanese descent
- Hebert Abimorad, journalist and poet of Lebanese descent
- Matías Abisab, footballer
- Alejandro Apud, football manager
- Cacho de la Cruz, entertainer, of Moroccan descent
- Amir Hamed, writer and translator, of Syrian descent
- Christian Mirza, academic, of Egyptian descent
- Jorge Nasser, musician, of Lebanese descent
- Amin Niffouri, politician, of Syrian descent

== See also ==
- Lebanese Uruguayans
- Palestinian Uruguayans
- Syrians in Uruguay
