= Cairoli =

Cairoli is an Italian name. It may refer to:

== People ==
- The Cairoli brothers, including:
  - Benedetto Cairoli (1825–1889), an Italian statesman
  - Enrico Cairoli (1840–1867), an Italian patriot
  - Giovanni Cairoli (1841–1869), an Italian patriot
- Adelaide Cairoli (1806–1871), their mother, also a patriot
- Charlie Cairoli (1910–1980), an Italian-English clown
- Matteo Cairoli (b. 1996), an Italian racing driver
- Milton Cairoli (b. 1933), a Uruguayan lawyer and judge
- Tony Cairoli (b. 1985), an Italian motorcycle racer

== Places ==
- Gropello Cairoli, a municipality in the province of Pavia, Italy
- Monument to the Cairoli Brothers on the Pincian hill of Rome depicting Enrico and Giovanni in 1867 at Villa Glori; of five brothers, four died fighting for the consolidation of the Italian country

== Ships ==
- Italian destroyer Benedetto Cairoli, a destroyer of the Italian Regia Marina (Royal Navy) commissioned in 1918
- Italian destroyer Francesco Nullo (1914), a destroyer of the Italian Regia Marina (Royal Navy) renamed Fratelli Cairoli in 1921

== Transportation ==
- Cairoli (Milan Metro), a station of the Milan Metro in Italy
