= Monument of Piazza Mentana =

Monument in Florence, Italy

Coordinates: 43°46′2.43″N 11°15′28.10″E

The Monument of Piazza Mentana or Monument to those fallen at the Battle of Mentana (Monumento ai caduti della battaglia di Mentana) is an early-20th century outdoor stone statue located the said square of Florence, Italy. The monument displays two patriotic fighters of Garibaldi's units, one wounded, the other fighting, in a dramatic scene.

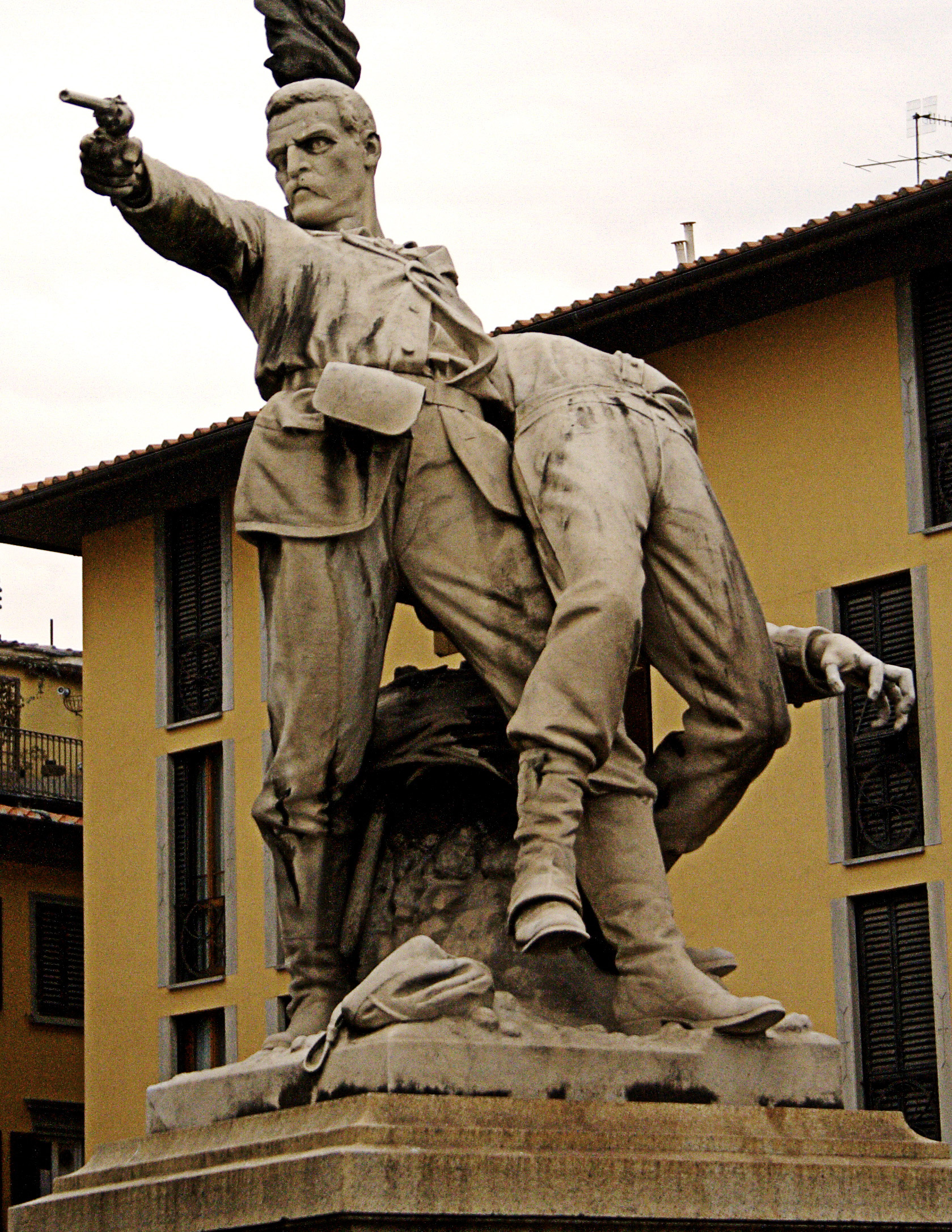
Front view of statue.

The commission was assigned in 1898 after a contest sponsored by the Società dei Reduci Garibaldini. The statuary group was sculpted by Oreste Calzolari, and it was inaugurated on April 27, 1902. It is meant to honor the 150 soldiers, who fighting with Garibaldi against the Franco-papal forces, died at the Battle of Mentana and the next day at Monterotondo. The plaque reads: "To the strong ones who fell at Mentana, consecrating Rome to Free Italy".

The stone group depicts two soldiers: one holding aloft and aiming a revolver, while he holds a wounded companion who still raises a flag or standard.

Critics noted the similarities of the subject to the Monument to the Cairoli Brothers (1883) by Ercole Rosa, a statue located near the Spanish Steps in Rome, which display a similar dramatic event with two soldiers. (Mazzanti). Both statues also seem to cite the well-known Hellenistic statue of Menelaus supporting the body of Patroclus, as interpreted in the Loggia dei Lanzi in Florence.

On the base are two bronze bas-reliefs depicting the retreat from Monterotondo and the battle of Mentana. A plaque states these were donated by donors from Trieste and Trentino.
