= Lebanese Uruguayans =

Lebanese Uruguayans Líbano-uruguayos
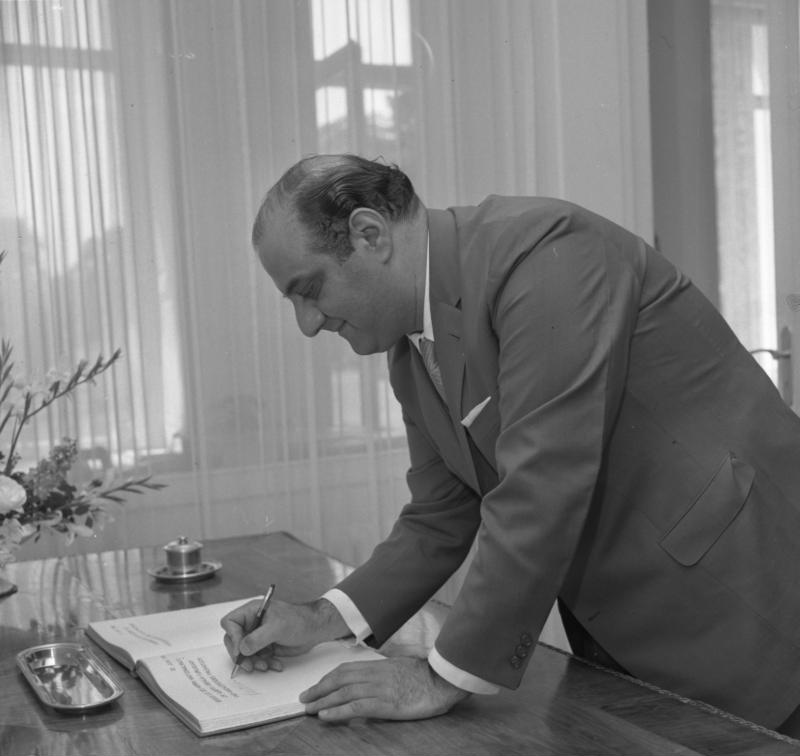
- Alberto Abdala, a lawyer and politician of Lebanese descent, who served as member of the National Council of Government (1963-1937) and, later, Vice President of Uruguay (1968-1972).

Total population
- Various estimates for descents: 53,000 (2009).; 70,000 (2008).; 80,000 (2014).

Regions with significant populations
- Montevideo, Chuy

Languages
- Uruguayan Spanish, Lebanese Arabic

Religion
- Christians (majority) and Islam (minority)

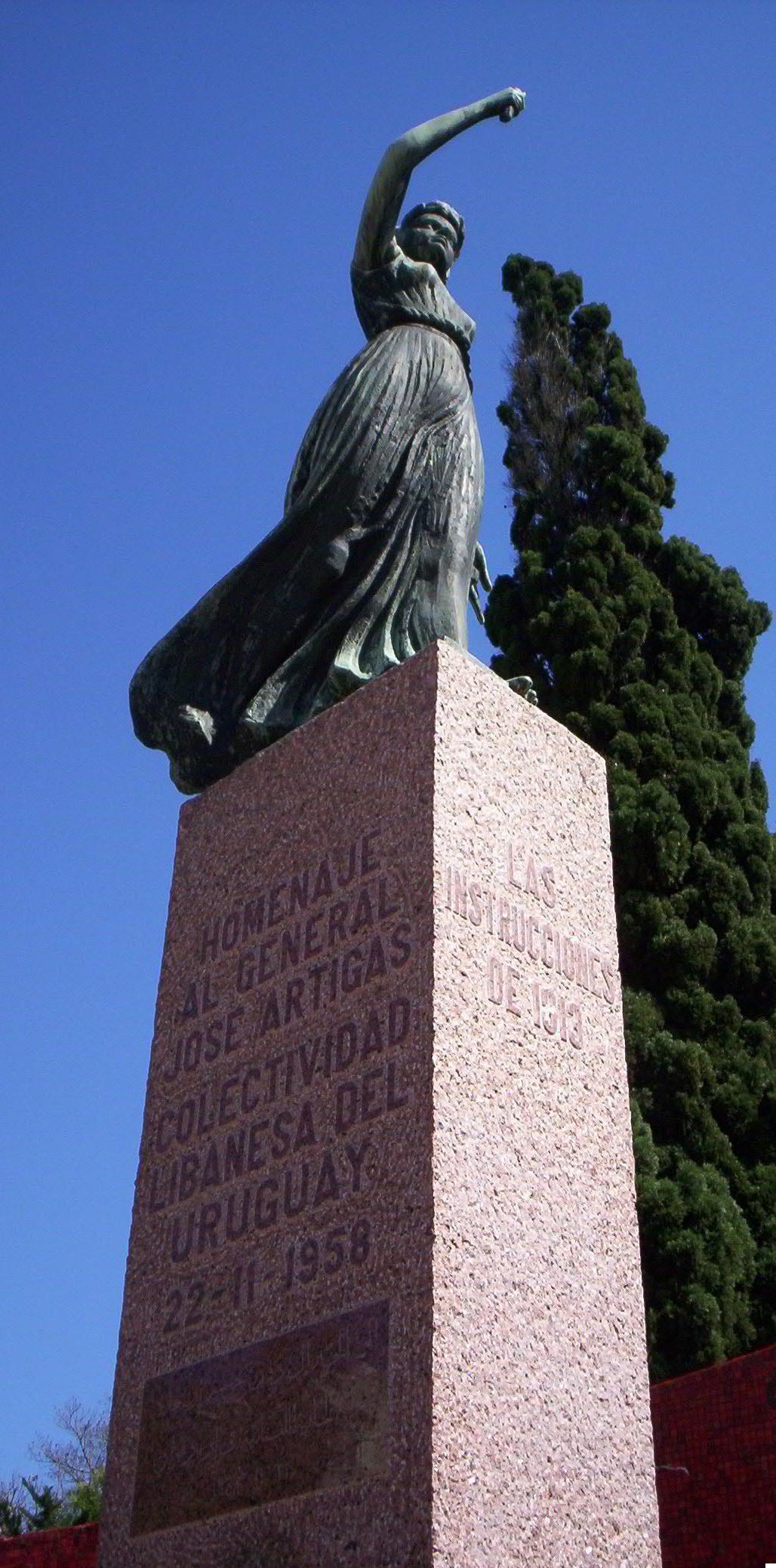
Memorial to the Uruguayan national hero José Gervasio Artigas, dedicated by the Lebanese community in Uruguay.

There are about 80,000 Lebanese Uruguayans, or Uruguayans of Lebanese origin. The Lebanese are one of the larger non-European communities, though still not as large a group as most European groups. Relations between Uruguay and Lebanon have always been close.

== History ==
The first Lebanese immigrants to Uruguay arrived in the 1860s, settling in Montevideo around Juan Lindolfo Cuestas street. These early immigrants were mainly Maronite Christians, speaking only Arabic. The last great influx of Lebanese came in the 1920s along with other nationalities like Europeans. Between 1908 and 1930, Montevideo's population doubled. Some of them also settled in the frontier city of Rivera.

On January 21, 1924, the Apostolic Missionary of Maronites was established by decree in Uruguay. On March 10, 1925, Monseñor Shallita arrived in Montevideo from Naples to lead the mission.

The early settlers faced some discrimination as "Asiatics", and a few were unable to adapt and returned to their homeland. However, most became established as small businessmen and entrepreneurs, and successfully adjusted to the society of their adopted country. Although retaining some cultural characteristics, notably the Lebanese cuisine, most Uruguayans of Lebanese origin no longer speak Arabic and have fully assimilated.

In 1997, the house speaker of Uruguay visited Lebanon and met Patriarch Sfeir. He noted that the 99-seat parliament in Uruguay included two members with Lebanese origins including himself. In 1954 there were 15,000 people of Lebanese descent living in Uruguay. By 2009 the number had grown to between 53,000 and 80,000. The 2011 Uruguayan census revealed 136 people who declared Lebanon as their country of birth.

Lebanese-Uruguayans have their own institutions:

- Lebanese Club in Uruguay (Spanish: Club Libanés del Uruguay), established 1902.
- Lebanese Women Association (Spanish: Asociación Libanesa Femenina), established 1915.
- Lebanese Society in Uruguay (Spanish: Sociedad Libanesa del Uruguay), established 1930.
- Children of Darbeshtar Society (Spanish: Sociedad Hijos de Darbeshtar).

The majority of Lebanese-Uruguayans are Christians who belong to various churches, including the Maronite Church (they have their own church, Our Lady of Lebanon), Roman Catholic, Eastern Orthodox and Melkite Catholic. There was also a small presence of Lebanese Jews. A scant number are Muslims.

== Notable Uruguayans of Lebanese origin ==
- Felipe Seade (1912 – 18 January 1969) was a social-realist painter and teacher born in Antofagasta, Chile, the elder son of a Lebanese immigrant family, who spent most of his life in Uruguay after moving to Montevideo at the age of 12.
- Alberto Abdala (1920–1986), born of Lebanese immigrant parents, was a Uruguayan politician and painter who was Vice-President of Uruguay from 1967 to 1972. He was noted for his abstract compositions in oil on glass.
- Bárbara Mori - Uruguayan-Mexican actress her mother is Lebanese.
- Dahd Sfeir (1932-2015), Uruguayan singer and actress
- Amir Hamed (1962-), Uruguayan writer and translator
- Jorge Nasser (1956-), musician
- Bruno Sfeir(1970-), painter whose work shows Cubist, Constructivist and surrealist influences, somewhat reminiscent of the school of art initiated by Uruguayan artist Joaquín Torres García.
- Jorge Chediak (1951-), lawyer and judge, former member of the Supreme Court
- Jorge Majfud (1969-), architect and writer
- Malena Muyala (1971-), singer
- Hebert Abimorad (1946-), journalist and poet
- Omar Lafluf (1954-), veterinarian and politician

== See also ==
- Lebanon–Uruguay relations
- Lebanese diaspora
- Arab diaspora
- Arab Uruguayans
