= Troise =

Troise is a surname. Notable people with the surname include:

- Ciccio Troise, Italian footballer and coach
- Domenico Troise, Italian sculptor of decorative carvings in Naples Cathedral, 1590
- Emanuele Troise (born 1979), Italian footballer and coach
- Pablo Troise (born 1936), Uruguayan lawyer and judge
- Pasquale Troise (1895-1957), Italian-born English bandleader
