= Elena Martínez Rosso =

Uruguayan lawyer and judge

President of the Supreme Court of Uruguay
- In office 1 February 2024 – 2 February 2025
- Preceded by: Doris Morales Martínez
- Succeeded by: John Pérez Brignani
- In office 1 February 2018 – 1 February 2019
- Preceded by: Jorge Chediak
- Succeeded by: Eduardo Turell Araquistain

Justice of the Supreme Court of Uruguay
- In office 2 September 2015 – 2 September 2025
- Preceded by: Jorge Ruibal
- Succeeded by: Julio Alfredo Posada

Personal details
- Spouse: Ope Pasquet
- Education: University of the Republic

Elena Martínez Rosso is a Uruguayan lawyer and lecturer who served as minister of the Supreme Court of Uruguay from 2015 to 2025.

== Career ==
Martínez Rosso graduated from the University of the Republic with a degree in law. She entered the Judiciary in 1981 as a Justice of the Peace (Spanish: Jueza de paz) in the Colonia Department.

She served as a Justice of the Peace in the Canelones Department from 1983 to 1988, then as a member of the Misdemeanor Court (Spanish: Tribunal de Faltas). In 1989 she was appointed as a Lawyer Judge (Spanish: Jueza Letrada) in the San José Department and a year later as head of the Legal Court of First Instance of Labor. On 13 March 2002, she assumed justice of the 6th Turn Civil Appeals Court, a position she held until 2015.

Martínez succeeded Jorge Ruibal as Justice of the Supreme Court, after he retired in June 2015. She was sworn in before the General Assembly on 2 September 2015, becoming the fourth woman to serve as such. She presided over the court in the 2018-2019 annual term.

On 1 February 2024, she again assumed the rotating presidency of the Supreme Court, succeeding Doris Morales Martínez. She is a professor at the Law School of the Catholic University of Uruguay.

== Personal life ==
Martínez Rosso is married to National Representative Ope Pasquet. They have two daughters, Florencia and Victoria.
