= Fratelli Cairoli =

Fratelli Cairoli may refer to:

- The Cairoli brothers, including:
  - Benedetto Cairoli (1825–1889), an Italian statesman
  - Enrico Cairoli (1840–1867), an Italian patriot
  - Giovanni Cairoli (1841–1869), an Italian patriot
- Italian destroyer Francesco Nullo (1914), an Italian destroyer later renamed Fratelli Cairoli
