= Antonio Marchesano =

Antonio Marchesano may refer to:

- Antonio Marchesano (politician)
- Antonio Marchesano (footballer)
