= Doris Morales Martínez =

Doris Morales

President of the Supreme Court of Uruguay
- Incumbent
- Assumed office 2 February 2026
- Preceded by: John Pérez Brignani
- In office 1 February 2023 – 1 February 2024
- Preceded by: John Pérez Brignani
- Succeeded by: Elena Martínez Rosso

Justice of the Supreme Court of Uruguay
- Incumbent
- Assumed office 8 February 2022
- Preceded by: Luis Tosi Boeri

Personal details
- Born: Doris Perla Morales Martínez; 25 September 1959 (age 66) Fray Marcos, Uruguay
- Education: University of the Republic

Doris Perla Morales Martínez (born 25 September 1959) is a Uruguayan lawyer who serves as a minister of the Supreme Court of Uruguay.

== Early life and education ==
Morales was born in Fray Marcos, Florida and raised in Bolívar, one of the smallest towns in the Canelones Department. She graduated from the University of the Republic in 1982 with a law degree. In 1987 she took the Labor Law graduate course at the University of the Republic, while from 1988 to 1989 she took the preparation course to enter the magistracy.

== Career ==
Two years after graduating, Morales began her teaching career in Forensic Techniques at the Law School of the University of the Republic, in 1986 she began teaching Procedural Law at the same college, and in 2000 at the University of Montevideo, as an assistant in the Introduction to Procedural Law class. In 2005 she was appointed interim group manager in Procedural Law II in the law degree at the University of the Republic.

Morales entered the Judiciary in 1989 as a Lawyer Judge (Spanish: Jueza Letrada) in Paysandú. In 1994, she held the same position in Las Piedras and a year later she took office as Family Lawyer Judge in Montevideo. In 2003 she was appointed to the Labor Court of Appeals, while continuing to teach at the university.

Morales succeeded Luis Tosi Boeri as Justice of the Supreme Court, after he retired on October 27, 2021. Since 90 days had elapsed since that date without an appointment by the General Assembly, Morales —who was the member of the Court of Appeals with the longest tenure in her position—, was automatically appointed to the position, in accordance with the provisions of Article 236 of the Constitution of the Republic. She took office as minister of the Supreme Court of Justice on February 8, 2022, after swearing in the position before the General Assembly. After her swearing in, the highest court had, for the first time, a mostly female integration, when she was accompanied by associate judges Bernadette Minvielle Sánchez and Elena Martínez Rosso. On February 1, 2023, she took office as president of the Supreme Court for the 2023 annual term, succeeding John Pérez Brignani. On February 1, 2024 she was succeeded by Elena Martínez Rosso.
