= Sebastián Andújar =

Uruguayan politician

President of the Chamber of Representatives of Uruguay
- In office 1 March 2023 – 1 March 2024
- Preceded by: Ope Pasquet
- Succeeded by: Ana Olivera

Personal details
- Born: 14 March 1974 (age 52)
- Party: National Party

Sebastián Andújar (born 14 March 1974) is a Uruguayan politician who has served in the Chamber of Representatives of Uruguay as a member of the National Party since 2015, and was President of the chamber from 2023 to 2024. He unsuccessfully ran for mayor of the Municipality of Canelones in the 2025 election.

== Early life ==
Sebastián Andújar was born on 14 March 1974. He worked in communications and rural production. His father Juan Andújar was a mayor.

== Career ==
Andújar joined the National Party when he was 15. In 2015, he was expelled from the party by Luis Lacalle Pou due to allegations of forged signatures and his debts, but was allowed back into the party in 2017. He was aligned with the Herrerism faction of the party until 2024, when he joined the National Alliance faction.

In the 2014 election Andújar was elected to the Chamber of Representatives of Uruguay from the Canelones Department. During his tenure he served on the Finance, Labor and Social Security, National Intelligence System, Native Forest Authority, and Municipal Affairs committees.

On 1 March 2023, Andújar succeeded Ope Pasquet as president of the chamber; he was the fourth president of the 49th legislative session after Pasquet, Alfredo Fratti, and Martín Lema. He ran for mayor of the Municipality of Canelones, in the 2025 election, but lost to Francisco Legnani, the nominee of the Broad Front coalition.

== Personal life ==
In 2022, Andújar was hospitalised and treated for head trauma after a car hit him while he was riding a bicycle.

== Political positions ==
Andújar supports having the holiday for Battle of Las Piedras, which is on 18 May, be a floating holiday held on different days each year.

== Works cited ==
- "Diputado Andújar se reincorpora al bloque de Lacalle Pou, del que había sido expulsado por "conductas impropias"". la Diaria. 2017.
- "Diputado Sebastián Andújar internado tras protagonizar un accidente en la Ruta Interbalnearia". Subrayado. 3 February 2022. Archived from the original on 26 June 2025.
- "Hijo 'e tigre". Brecha. 1 October 2015. Archived from the original on 26 June 2025.
- "Perfiles de diputados del Interior". Montevideo Portal. 15 February 2015. Archived from the original on 26 June 2025.
- "¿Quién ganó en Canelones?: así fue el resultado del escrutinio primario en las elecciones departamentales". El País. 11 May 2025. Archived from the original on 12 May 2025.
- "Sebastián Andújar takes office as Speaker of the Uruguayan House of Representatives". Infobae. 1 March 2023. Archived from the original on 26 June 2025.
- "¿Valorar el hecho histórico o el aporte al turismo? Andújar reactivó debate sobre inamovilidad de feriados". Subrayado. 22 May 2023. Archived from the original on 26 June 2025.
- Cassarino, Jennifer (25 April 2025). "Con Sebastian Andújar, candidato a intendente de Canelones por el Partido Nacional/Coalición Republicana". Hoy Canelones. Archived from the original on 26 June 2025.
- Castillo, Federico (22 August 2024). "Tras su salida del Herrerismo, Sebastián Andújar se une a Alianza País". Búsqueda. Archived from the original on 26 June 2025.
