= Larrieu =

Larrieu is a French surname. Notable people with the surname include:

- Arnaud Larrieu (b. 1966), French film director and screenwriter
- Francie Larrieu Smith (b. 1952), American track and field athlete
- Jean-Claude Larrieu (b. 1943), French cinematographer
- Jean-Claude Larrieu (b. 1946), French footballer
- Jean-Marie Larrieu (b. 1965), French film director and screenwriter
- Maxence Larrieu (b. 1934), French classical flautist
- Romain Larrieu (b. 1976) French footballer

== See also ==
- Amel Larrieux (b. 1973), American singer-songwriter
- Jorge Larrieux (b. 1946), Uruguayan lawyer and judge
