= Sturla (disambiguation) =

Sturla may refer to:

== Places ==
- Sturla, a neighbourhood of Genoa, Italy

== People ==
=== Given name ===
- Sturla Ásgeirsson (born 1980), Icelandic handball player
- Sturla Böðvarsson (born 1945), Icelandic politician, President of the Althing
- Sturla Holm Lægreid (born 1997), Norwegian biathlete
- Sturla Ottesen (born 2001), Norwegian footballer
- Sturla Sighvatsson (1199 – 1238), Icelandic chieftain of the Sturlungar family clan
- Sturla Þórðarson (1214 – 1284), Icelandic writer and skald

=== Surname ===
- Daniel Sturla, SDB (born 1959), Uruguayan Roman Catholic cleric, archbishop of Montevideo
- Gérard Sturla (1930 – 2006), French basketball player
- Héctor Martín Sturla (1953 - 1991), Uruguayan lawyer and politician
