= Roberto Parga =

Uruguayan judge

Roberto Parga (4 February 1937 – 18 March 2015) was an Uruguayan judge who served on the Supreme Court from 2000 to 2007.
