= Palestinian Uruguayans =

Palestinian Uruguayans Palestinos uruguayos فلسطينيو أوروغواي
Regions with significant populations
- Chuy, Rivera, Montevideo

Languages
- Palestinian Arabic, Spanish

Religion
- Islam and Christianity

Related ethnic groups
- Palestinian Brazilian and other Palestinian people Other Arab Uruguayans

Palestinian Uruguayans (Arabic: فلسطينيو أوروغواي) are Uruguayan citizens of Palestinian descent or Palestine-born people residing in Uruguay. There are approximately 5000 Uruguayans with Palestinian ancestry, mostly living on the Brazilian border. Most of them in Chuy, where they run their own mosque and association, others in Rivera.

The majority of Palestinian Uruguayans are Muslim, with a tiny Christian minority.

== See also ==
- Palestine–Uruguay relations
- Palestinian diaspora
- Arab Uruguayan
