= Roberto Echavarren =

Uruguayan poet and translator

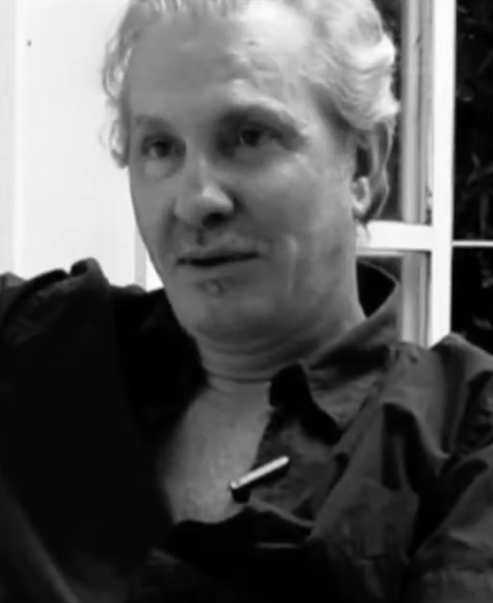
Roberto Echavarren

Roberto Echavarren (born 1944 in Montevideo) is an Uruguayan poet and translator.

== Biography ==
Echavarren moved to Germany at the age of 20 after winning a scholarship to study philosophy, and later moved to France, where he earned his doctorate at the University of Paris VIII. He later moved to London and joined the local branch of the Gay Liberation Front, an experience that proved pivotal in his life, especially given that LGBTQ people were still being persecuted in Uruguay at the time.

He has taught in Europe, where he lectured at the University of London, and in the Americas, where he served as a professor for twenty years at New York University and continued his teaching career at the University of Buenos Aires (Rojas Institute) and currently at the University of the Republic (Faculty of Humanities).

He has translated works by William Shakespeare, Friedrich Nietzsche, John Ashbery, Wallace Stevens, Paulo Leminski, and Haroldo de Campos. He has also written monographs on authors such as Felisberto Hernández and Manuel Puig, as well as poetry, novels, and popular essays.

== Works ==
- La Planicie Mojada, 1981; poems
- El espacio de la verdad: Felisberto Hernández, Buenos Aires, Sudamericana, 1981; essay
- Animalaccio, 1986; poems
- Montaje y alteridad del sujeto: Manuel Puig, Santiago de Chile, Maitén, 1986; essay
- Aura Amara, 1989; poems
- Poemas Largos, 1990
- Universal Ilógico, 1994
- Oír no es ver, 1994; poems
- Ave Roc, Montevideo, Graffiti, 1994; novel
- Arte andrógino: estilo versus moda, 1998 (expanded in Montevideo, Brecha, 2008); essay
- Performance, Buenos Aires, Eudeba, 2000
- Margen de ficción: poéticas de la narrativa hispanoamericana, México, Joaquín Mortiz, 1992
- El diablo en el pelo, Montevideo, Trilce, 2003
- Casino Atlántico, Montevideo, Artefato, 2004; poems
- Centralasia, Buenos Aires, Tse-tse, 2005; poems
- Andrógino Onetti, 2007.
- Fuera de género: criaturas de la invención erótica, Buenos Aires, Losada, 2007
- El expreso entre el sueño y la vigilia, Montevideo, Premio Fundación Nancy Bacelo, 2009
- Ruido de fondo, Santiago de Chile, Cuarto Propio, 2009
- Yo era una brasa, Montevideo, HUM, 2009
- La salud de los enfermos, Montevideo, HUM, 2010; narrative
- Porno y postporno, Montevideo, HUM, 2011; essay (in collaboration with Ercole Lissardi and Amir Hamed)
- Las noches rusas. Materia y memoria, La Flauta Mágica, 2011; ISBN 9789974983786
- The Virgin Mountain, New Orleans, Diálogos Books, 2017; poem, translated by the author and Donald Wellman.
