= List of presidents of the Chamber of Representatives of Uruguay =

List of presidents of the Chamber of Representatives of Uruguay.

Below is a list of office-holders from 1830.

Name	Entered office	Left office
Francisco Antonino Vidal Gosende	1830	1835
Antonino Domingo Costa	1836	
Manuel Errazquin	1837	1838
Manuel Basilio Bustamante	1839	
Vacant	1840	
Julián Álvarez	1841	1843
Pedro Pablo Vidal	1843	
Juan Zufriateguy	1844	
Eusebio Cabral	1845	
Guerra Grande	1846	1851
José M. Martínez	1852	
Atanasio Cruz Aguirre	1853	
Salvador Tort	1854	
José Encarnación de Zas	1854	
Mateo Magariños	1855	
José G. Palomeque	1856	1857
Julio C. Pereira	1858	1860
Marcos Vaeza	1861	
Pedro Fuentes	1862	1863
Vacant	1864	1867
Antonio Rodríguez Caballero	1868	
Eusebio Cabral	1868	
Francisco Javier Laviña	1869	
Juan Francisco Rodríguez	1870	1872
Alejandro Chucarro (hijo)	1873	
Ambrosio Velazco	1874	1875
Pedro Carve	1876	
Vacant	1877	
José Cándido Bustamante	1879	
Juan Peñalva	1880	
José Ladislao Terra	1880	
Fernando Torres	1881	
Conrado Rucker	1882	
José Cándido Bustamante	1882	1883
Francisco Javier Laviña	1884	
Alberto Flangini	1885	
Vicente Garzón	1886	
Eduardo Mac Eachen	1887	
Juan Magariños Cervantes	1888	1889
Juan Alberto Capurro	1890	
Eduardo Chucarro	1890	
Miguel Herrera y Obes	1891	1894
Felipe Lacueva	1895	
Duncan Stewart	1896	
Alcides Montero	1897	1898
José Saavedra	1899	1901
Benito Cuñarro	1902	
Antonio María Rodríguez	1903	1911
Eugenio Lagarmilla	1912	1913
Ricardo Areco	1914	
Ramón Saldaña	1915	1916
Domingo Arena	1917	1918
César Alberto Miranda	1919	
Carlos María Sorín	1920	
José F. Arias	1921	
Héctor R. Gómez	1922	
Aureliano Rodríguez Larreta	1923	
Gabriel Terra	1923	1924
César G. Gutiérrez	1925	
Arturo Lussich	1926	
Ítalo Perotti	1926	1927
Alfredo García Morales	1928	
Guillermo L. García	1929	1931
José Otamendi	1932	1933
Julio César Estol	1934	1936
Julio César Canessa	1936	1937
Cyro Giambruno	1938	1940
Euclides Sosa Aguiar	1941	
Coup d'état of Alfredo Baldomir, no parliament	1942	1943
Luis Batlle Berres	1943	1945
Juan Francisco Guichón	1946	
Antonio Rubio Pérez	1947	
José Lissidini	1948	1950
Arturo Lezama	1951	
José Lissidini	1952	
Arturo Lezama	1953	
Carlos B. Moreno	1954	
Fermin Sorhueta	March 1, 1955	March 1, 1957
Delfos Roche	March 1, 1957	March 1, 1958
Juan Rodríguez Correa	March 1, 1958	March 1, 1959
Francisco Rodríguez Camusso	March 1, 1959	March 1, 1960
Alejandro Zorrilla de San Martín	March 1, 1960	March 1, 1961
Ulises Pivel Devoto	March 1, 1961	March 1, 1962
Ciro Ciompi	March 1, 1962	March 1, 1963
Mauro Saravia	March 1, 1963	March 1, 1964
Luis Hierro Gambardella	March 1, 1964	March 1, 1965
Luis A. Viera	March 1, 1965	March 1, 1966
Mario Héber Usher	March 1, 1966	March 1, 1967
Nelson Constanza	March 1, 1967	March 1, 1968
Luis Riñon Perret	March 1, 1968	March 1, 1969
Hugo Batalla	March 1, 1969	March 1, 1970
Fernando Elichirigoity	March 1, 1970	March 1, 1971
Jorge Vila	March 1, 1971	March 1, 1972
Héctor Gutiérrez Ruiz	March 1, 1972	June 27, 1973
vacant (dictatorship)	June 27, 1973	February 14, 1985
Antonio Marchesano	February 15, 1985	March 1, 1986
Luis Ituño	March 1, 1986	March 1, 1987
Victor Cortazzo	March 1, 1987	March 1, 1988
Ernesto Amorín Larranãga	March 1, 1988	March 1, 1989
Luis Hierro López	March 1, 1989	March 1, 1990
Héctor Martín Sturla	March 1, 1990	March 1, 1991
Juan Adolfo Singer	March 1, 1991	March 1, 1992
Alem García	March 1, 1992	March 1, 1993
Luis Alberto Heber	March 1, 1993	March 1, 1994
Mario Cantón	March 1, 1994	March 1, 1995
Guillermo Stirling	March 1, 1995	March 1, 1996
Jorge Machiñena	March 1, 1996	March 1, 1997
Carlos Baráibar	March 1, 1997	March 1, 1998
Jaime Trobo	March 1, 1998	March 1, 1999
Ariel Lausarot	March 1, 1999	March 1, 2000
Washington Abdala	March 1, 2000	March 1, 2001
Gustavo Penadés	March 1, 2001	March 1, 2002
Guillermo Álvarez	March 1, 2002	March 1, 2003
Jorge Chápper	March 1, 2003	March 1, 2004
José Amorín Batlle	March 1, 2004	March 1, 2005
Nora Castro	March 1, 2005	March 1, 2006
Julio Cardozo	March 1, 2006	March 1, 2007
Enrique Pintado	March 1, 2007	March 1, 2008
Alberto Perdomo	March 1, 2008	March 1, 2009
Roque Arregui	March 1, 2009	March 1, 2010
Ivonne Passada	March 1, 2010	March 1, 2011
Luis Lacalle Pou	March 1, 2011	March 1, 2012
Jorge Orrico	March 1, 2012	March 1, 2013
Germán Cardoso	March 1, 2013	March 1, 2014
Aníbal Pereyra	March 1, 2014	March 1, 2015
Alejandro Sánchez	March 1, 2015	March 1, 2016
Gerardo Amarilla	March 1, 2016	March 1, 2017
José Carlos Mahía	March 1, 2017	March 1, 2018
Jorge Gandini	March 1, 2018	March 1, 2019
Cecilia Bottino	March 1, 2019	February 15, 2020
Martín Lema	February 15, 2020	March 1, 2021
Alfredo Fratti	March 1, 2021	March 1, 2022
Ope Pasquet	March 1, 2022	March 1, 2023
Sebastián Andújar	March 1, 2023	March 1, 2024
Ana Olivera	March 1, 2024	February 15, 2025
Sebastián Valdomir	February 15, 2025	March 1, 2026
Rodrigo Goñi Reyes	March 1, 2026	Incumbent
