= Ricardo Pérez Manrique =

Uruguayan lawyer and judge (born 1947)

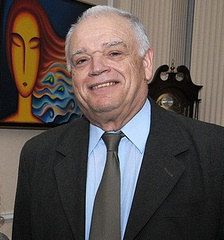
Ricardo Pérez Manrique

Ricardo Pérez Manrique (born 17 May 1947) is a Uruguayan lawyer and judge who has been serving as the President of the Inter-American Court of Human Rights since January 2022.

Since 2012 he is a member of the Supreme Court of Justice of Uruguay.

== Publications ==
- Código de la Infancia y la Adolescencia, comentado y anotado (with Jacinta Balbela)
- Reflexiones sobre la Ley de Seguridad Ciudadana (with Milton Cairoli)
