= Ercole Rosa =

Italian sculptor

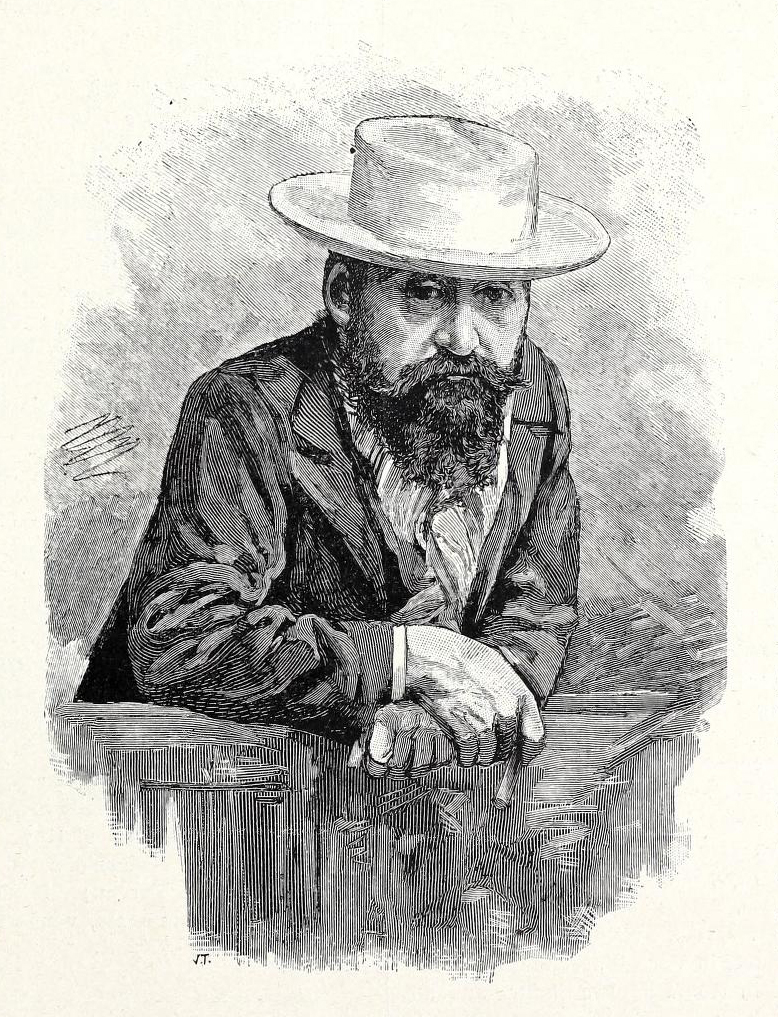
Depiction of Ercole from 1896

Ercole Rosa (13 February 1846 – 12 October 1893) was an Italian sculptor.

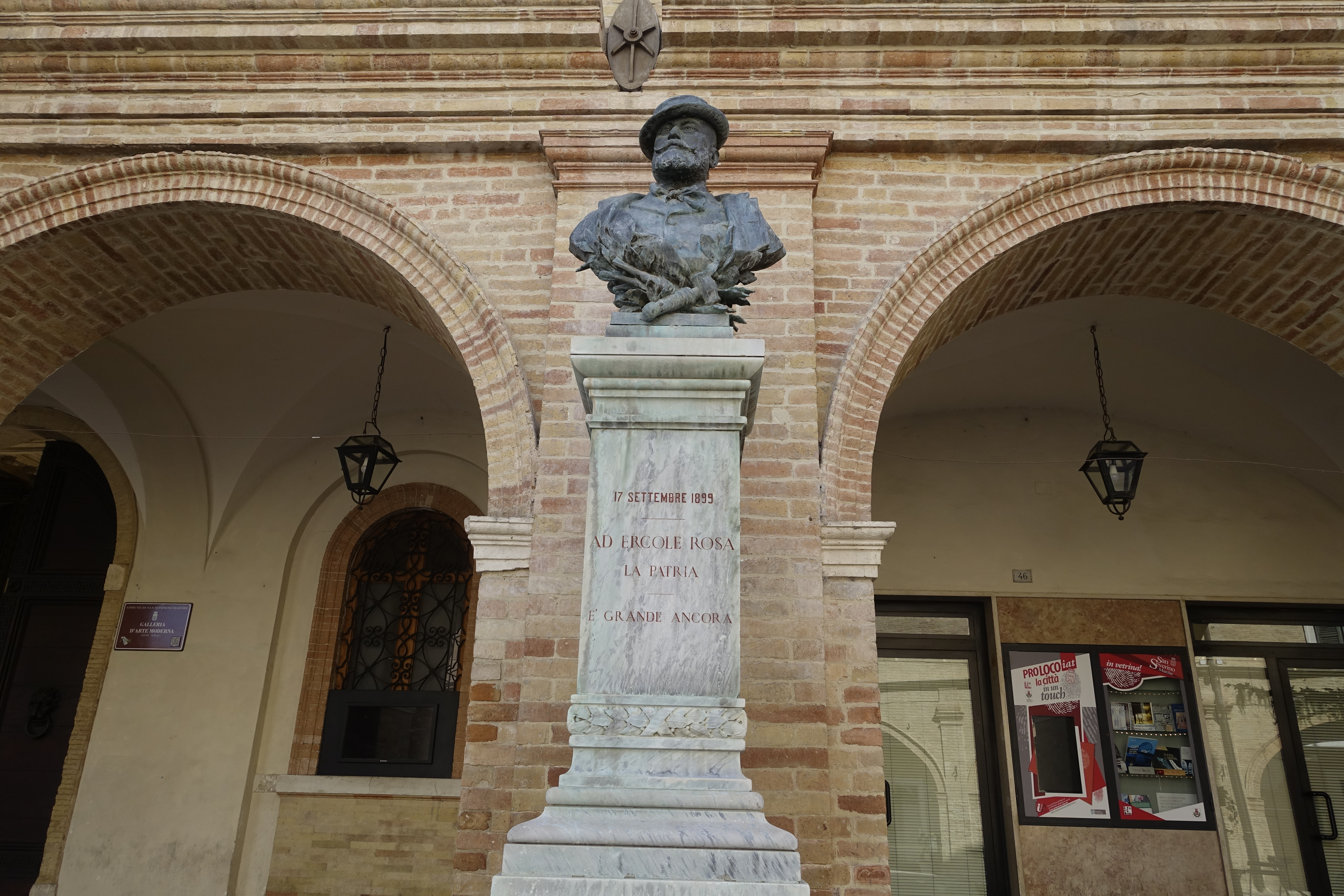
Monument to Ercole Rosa in San Severino Marche

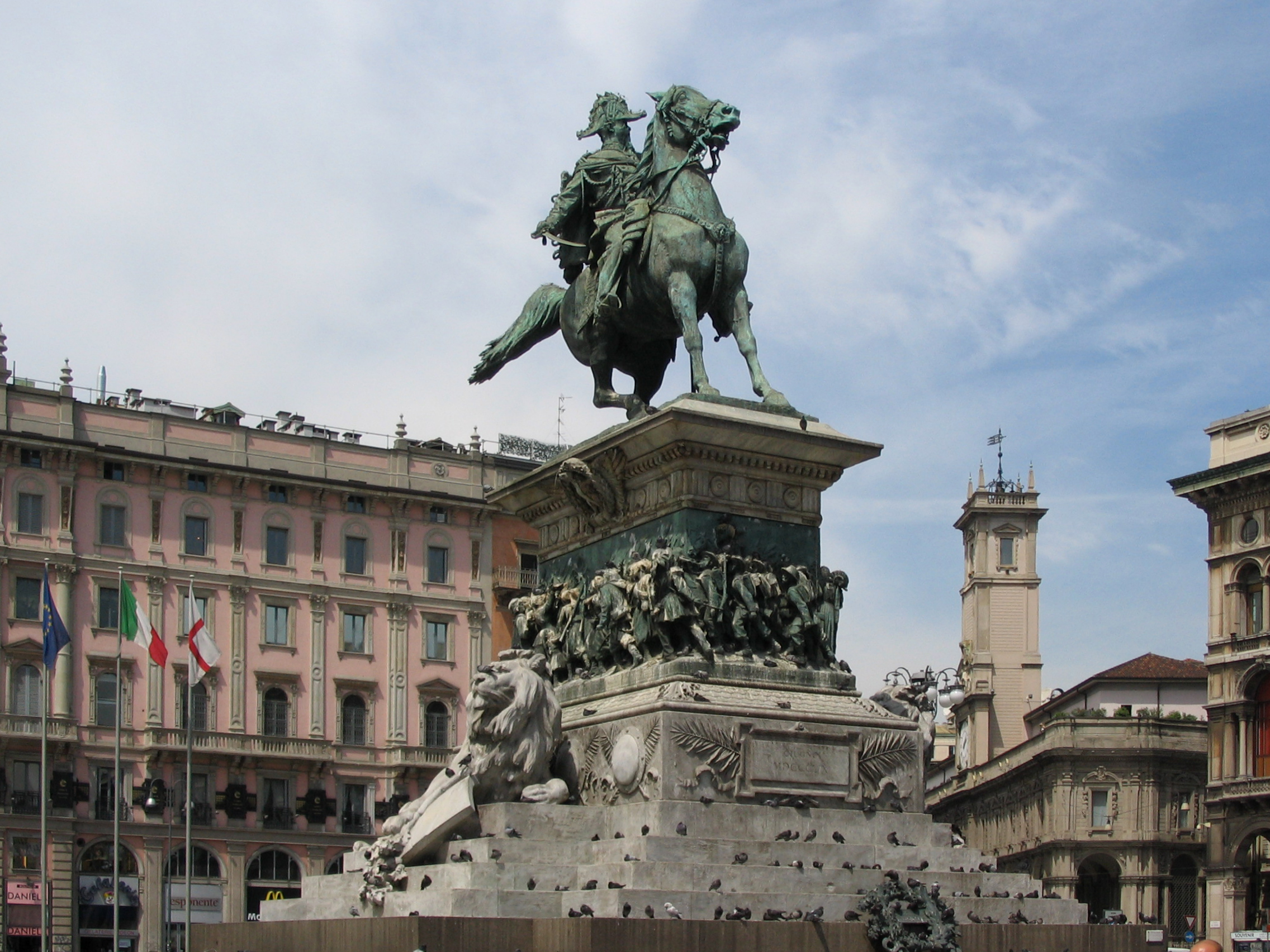
Monument to Vittorio Emanuele II located in the Piazza Duomo, Milan.

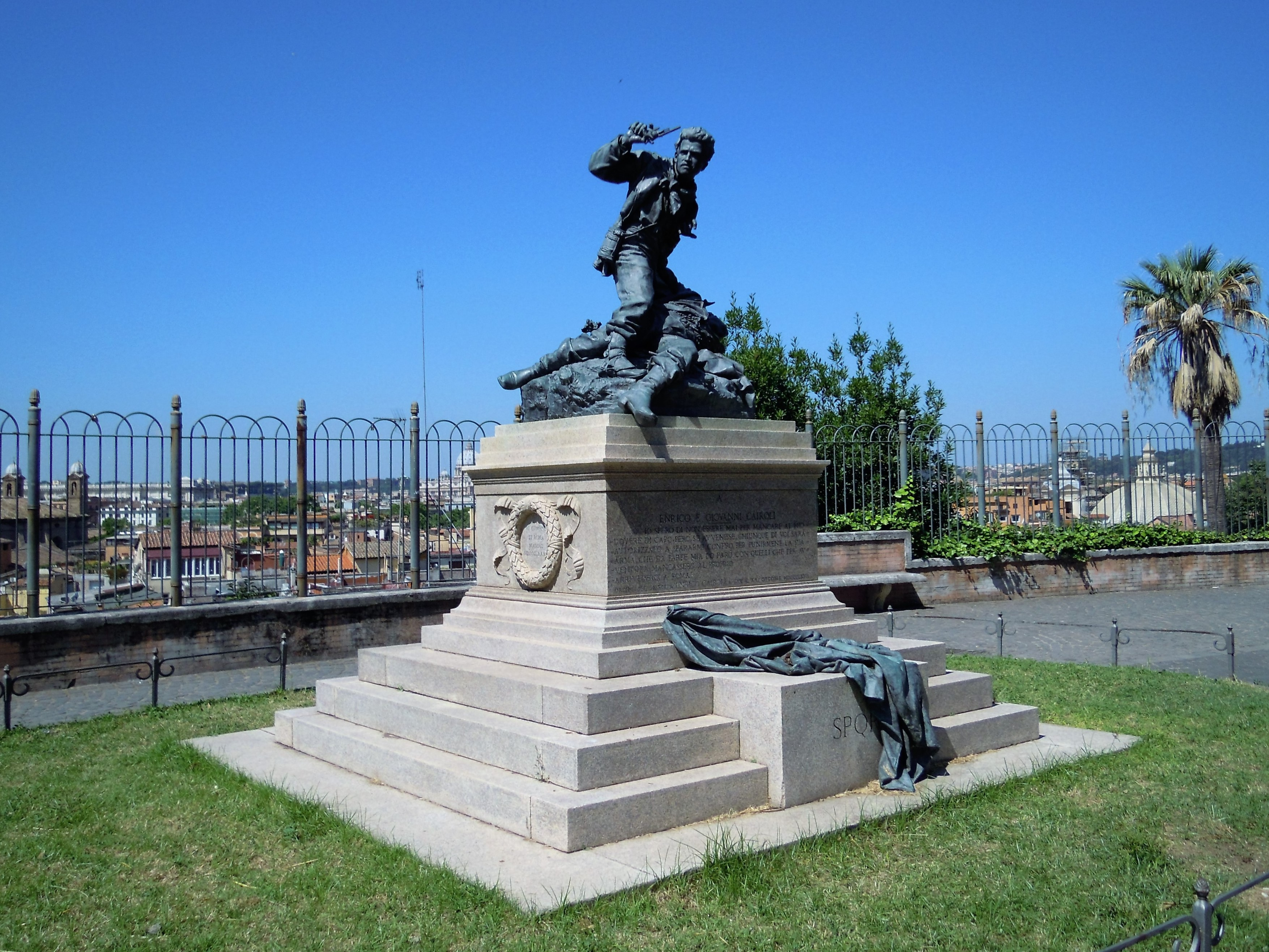
Monument to the Cairoli Brothers in the Pincian Hill

== Biography ==
Ercole was born in Rome to a stonemason of limited means. As a boy, Ercole was employed by his father making small terracotta figurines, which were sold. The Bishop of San Severino Marche, from where the family originated, sponsored the boy's education at the Academy of St Luke in Rome. Erocle by 1861 was working as an aide for various sculptors in town. In 1867, he fought with the troops of Garibaldi at the Battle of Mentana. Six years later he exhibited at the Fine Arts Exhibition, a sculptural group depicting the Brothers Cairoli. A bronze work was commissioned by the City of Rome and placed in a prominent spot in the Pincian Gardens, overlooking the center of Rome.

After this work, he gained major commissions: he labored for 12 years to complete the Monument to Vittorio Emanuele II, Milan, which was inaugurated in 1896 posthumous to his death. Among his other works were the statues in the facade of the Palazzo delle Finanze of Rome, the Diana the hunter; the large bust of Alessandro Manzoni in the Roman Galleria nazionale d'arte moderna e contemporanea; the Bust of Bartolomeo Eustachi in the city hall of San Severino; a bust of Nicola Fabrizi and Giuseppe Garibaldi.

== Bibliography ==
- monumento ai Fratelli Cairoli e il Sacro Drappello di Villa Glori by Baccio Emanuele Baineri, editor Stab. tipografico di G. Civelli (1883).
- L'Edilizia Moderna, Year 5, Volume 6 (1896), pages 40–41. Article on Ercole Rosa, by Luca Beltrami.
- Encyclopedia Treccani (1936) article by Palma Bucarelli.
