= Jacinta Balbela =

Jacinta Balbela (September 29, 1919 – October 26, 2007) was an Uruguayan judge. She was the second woman justice of the Supreme Court of Justice.

== Early life ==
Born in Salto, she obtained her degree as a lawye] in 1945, and in 1952 she was appointed as a judge. She served in many towns of the country, and later as a criminal judge in Montevideo.

== Career ==
In 1973 she became a member of a Court of Appeal with criminal jurisdiction. Twelve years later, in May 1985, she was appointed a member of the Supreme Court of Justice, where she remained until September 1989, when she retired because she had reached the age of 70.

After her retirement from the courts, she served as the co-director of the United Nations Latin American Institute for the Prevention of Crime and the Treatment of Offenders (ILANUD) in San José, Costa Rica.

She also wrote numerous articles about criminal lawy, family law and human rights. She died in Montevideo.

She died in October 2007. Her remains are buried at Cementerio del Norte, Montevideo.

== Publications ==
- Código de la Infancia y la Adolescencia, comentado y anotado (with Ricardo Pérez Manrique)
