= Hermann Kanzler =

German politician and soldier (1822–1888)

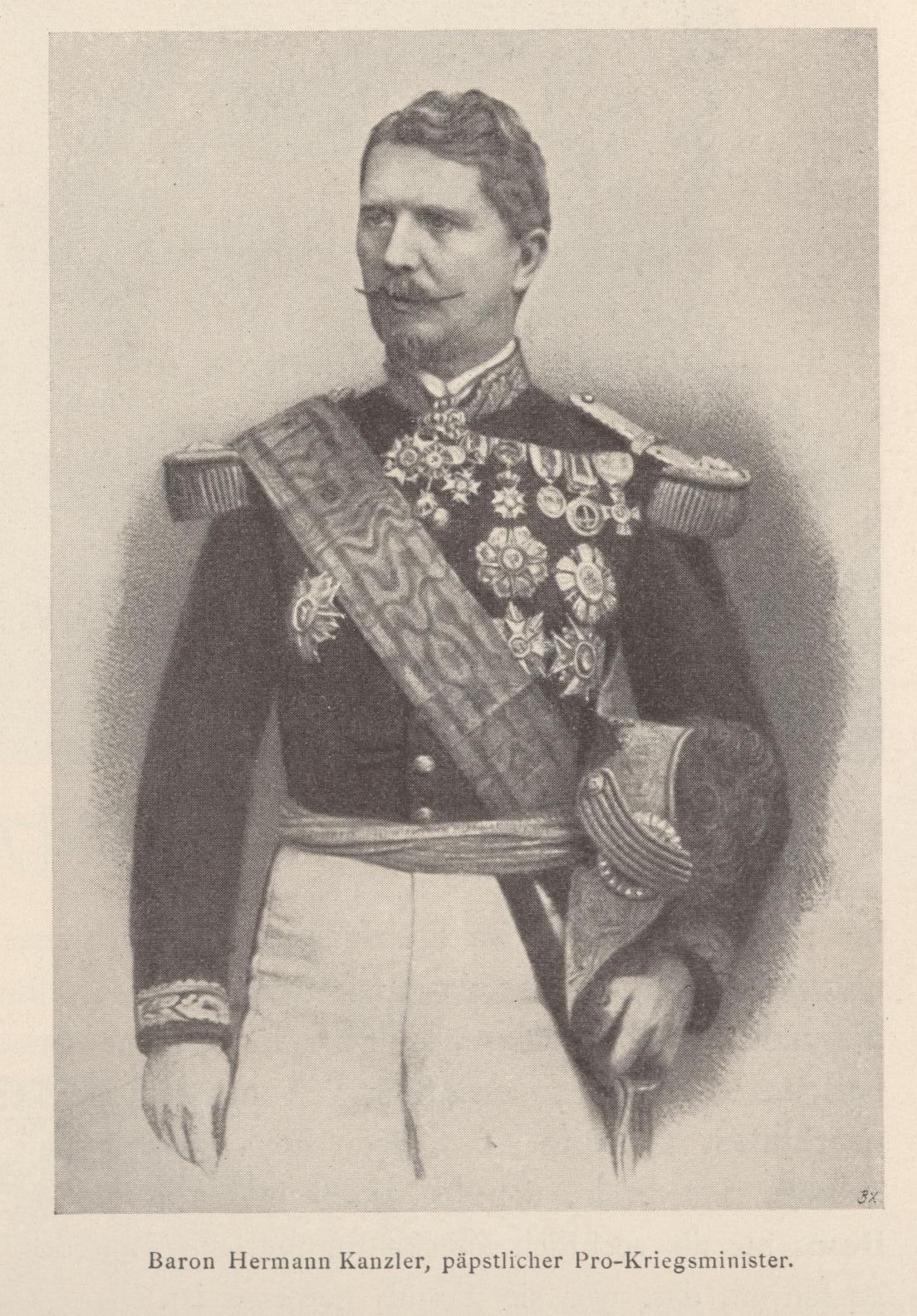
- General Hermann Kanzler
- Born: 28 March 1822; Weingarten, Grand Duchy of Baden
- Died: 6 January 1888 (aged 65) Rome, Kingdom of Italy
- Buried: Vöran
- Allegiance: Papal States
- Service years: 18??–1844; 1845–1870
- Rank: General
- Commands: Papal States Army
- Conflicts: Unification of Italy; First Italian War of Independence; Battle of Mentana; Capture of Rome
- Education: Military School of Karlsruhe
- Children: Rudolf Kanzler

Hermann Kanzler (28 March 1822 – 6 January 1888) was a German general who commanded the Army of the Papal States and was the arms minister during the reign of Pope Pius IX. He led Papal forces during the Battle of Mentana against Italian volunteers led by Garibaldi.

== Career ==
He was born in southern Germany in Weingarten in 1822 from a middle-class family, therefore with a surname still lacking the noble predicate "von". After high school he entered the military school of Karlsruhe and graduated as an officer in 1840, however he resigned in 1844.

After a stay in England, Kanzler entered the papal army in 1845, with the rank of captain; in 1848 he fought against the Austrians during the First War of Independence and, in 1859, he became regimental commander. A feverish job, in constant competition with the upheavals of Garibaldi's men throughout Italy.

The first major commitments came in 1867 when outbreaks of revolt were stirred up inside the Eternal City which, although not having the desired effects in the Roman population, produced the attack on the Serristori Barracks, the insurrection at the Ajani Wool Mill, severely repressed, and Garibaldi's raid with the clash at Villa Glori.

On the outside, however, the Garibaldians, with the tacit support of the Kingdom of Italy, started a real military campaign that from north and south aimed to conquer Rome. This led to the Battle of Monterotondo (25 October 1867) and that of Mentana (3 November 1867) where the French Expeditionary Force also made a decisive contribution, thanks also to its new Chassepot breech-loading rifles. The defeat for Garibaldi was complete. The excellent telegraph system and the encrypted code in use proved to be important for the papal victory.

To Kanzler, the Pontiff offered a noble title of high rank, but he refused as his modest finances would not allow him to maintain a lifestyle that matched his new social status. However, the victory of Mentana did not reassure the proministro about the future, so much so that he continued tirelessly in strengthening the papal army with new enlistments and works in the fortification of the walls of both the Leonine City and the Castel S. Angelo.

In 1870, after France had declared war on Prussia, the quick defeat suffered on 2 September by the French at Sedan brought down the empire of Napoleon III. Without French support, the State of the Church was now only in the hands of his small army and, as Pius IX wrote, "of God". Kanzler was under no illusions. Although the Italian Army had clearly preponderant forces, he aimed at an all-out resistance, until the inevitable capitulation of what remained of the State of the Church, which would demonstrate to Europe the violence perpetrated against the Pope.

After Pius IX refused the proposal to allow the Italian troops to enter Rome peacefully, Kanzler prepared for defense by proclaiming a state of siege. In a few days the walls were equipped with the available artillery and the city gates were buried. Troops stationed in the province were recalled and observation points were set up.

A few hours after the attack on September 20, the Papal Army was forced to surrender, as both sovereigns wanted to avoid excessive bloodshed during the capture of Rome. Dozens had died.

After the taking of Porta Pia, at the age of 48, Kanzler's career was over; he decided to stay in Rome with his family, continuing to maintain the now honorific position of proministro delle Armi. After the death of Pius IX he declined a pension from the Italian government with dignity and lived in very modest financial conditions.

Unexpectedly, in 1887, Leo XIII appointed him a baron, and this time Kanzler accepted: "A high title without the corresponding means to support it is a real burden", he wrote to a relative: "The title of Baron at least is more related to the my modest financial situation. The unexpected manifestation of the Holy Father is proof of the approval of the Holy Father of how the papal troops operated under my command”.

The following year, suffering from a sore on his foot, Kanzler died, peacefully and with all religious comforts, surrounded by his family, including his son Rudolf Kanzler who would become one of the most famous archaeologists of ancient Rome. His family went extinct, with the death of his nephew Angelo in the war in 1916. Today he rests among his Zouaves at Vöran and on his tomb, a Roman-style strigilated sarcophagus, two words at the beginning of the epitaph say it all: "BONVS MILES" ("a good soldier").
