= Palestine–Uruguay relations =

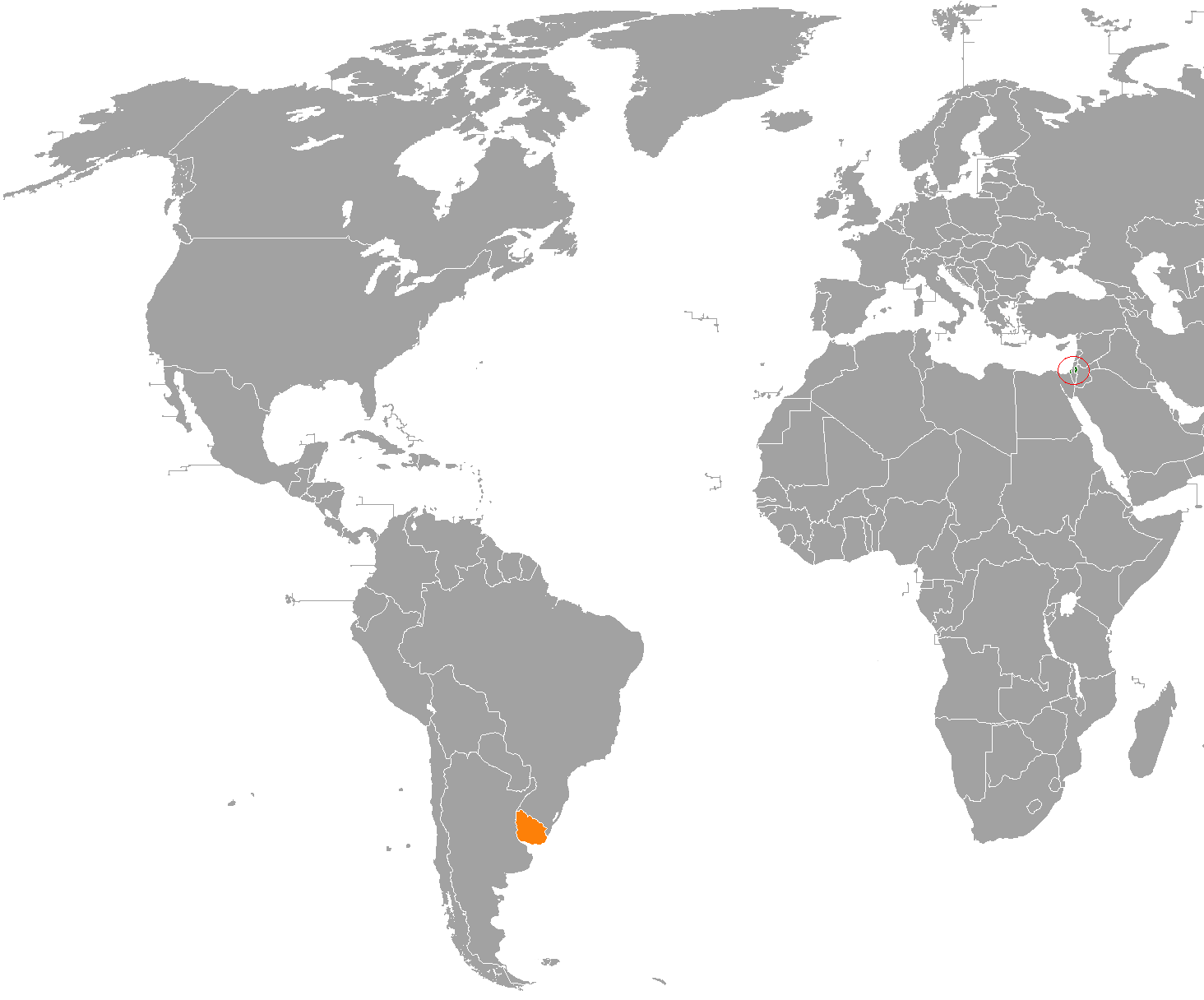

- Palestine: Uruguay

The State of Palestine has an embassy in Montevideo. The Oriental Republic of Uruguay has an embassy in Ramallah. During the period 2020-2024, the ambassador of Palestine in Montevideo is Nadia Rasheed.

Uruguay recognized Palestine in 2011, without specifically recognizing borders. There is a small Palestinian population in Uruguay, numbering a few thousands.

== See also ==
- Foreign relations of Palestine
- Foreign relations of Uruguay
- Palestinian Uruguayans
