= Gerardo Amarilla =

Uruguayan politician

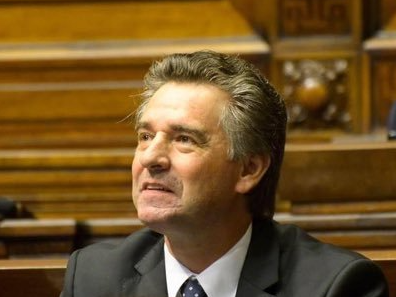

President of the Chamber of Deputies
- In office 1 March 2016 – 1 March 2017
- Preceded by: Alejandro Sánchez
- Succeeded by: José Carlos Mahía

Personal details
- Born: 1 February 1969 (age 56)
- Political party: National Party
- Website: http://gerardoamarilla.com/

Gerardo Amarilla (born 1 February 1969) is an Uruguayan politician. He was President of the Chamber of Deputies of Uruguay between 1 March 2016 and 1 March 2017. He replaced Alejandro Sánchez. Amarilla is a member of the National Party. He was succeeded as president by José Carlos Mahía on 1 March 2017.

Amarilla is an evangelical and he was the first evangelical to become President of the Chamber of Deputies. He has taken position against the decriminalization of abortion, the legalized sale of marijuana and same-sex marriage.

In the 2009 elections, he was elected to the Chamber of Deputies for the Rivera Department for the 2010–2015 period.
