= Raúl Alonso de Marco =

Raúl José Alonso de Marco (March 8, 1934 – February 26, 2007) was a Uruguayan lawyer and judge.

== Biography ==
He obtained his degree as a lawyer in 1958, and the next year was appointed as a judge in the town of Rivera. After that, he has served in Cerro Largo, Durazno and Colonia. In 1965 he was appointed a civil judge in Montevideo.

In 1982 he became a member of a court of appeal with civil jurisdiction. Ten years later, in September 1992, he was appointed as a member of the Supreme Court of Justice, a post in which he remained until 2002.

After his retirement from the judiciary, he defended the former attorney general, Óscar Peri Valdez, who was accused of various irregularities during his time in office.

He also wrote numerous articles about civil law.
