= Arturo Lussich =

Uruguayan politician (1872–1966)

Arturo Lussich (6 July 1872, in Montevideo – 22 May 1966) was a Uruguayan physician and politician.

He belonged to the National Party, for which he candidated several times. In 1916-1917 he was a member of the first National Council of Administration. In 1926 he presided over the Chamber of Deputies.
