= Pablo Iturralde =

Uruguayan politician and attorney

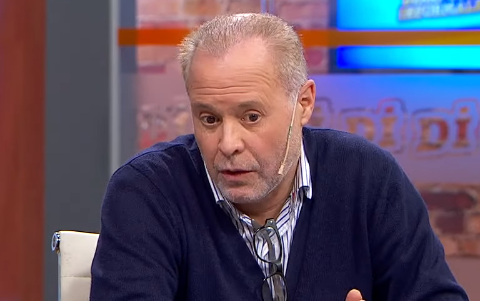

President of the National Party
- In office 11 May 2020 – 23 May 2024
- Preceded by: Pablo D. Abdala

Representative of Uruguay for Montevideo
- In office 15 February 2005 – 15 February 2020

Personal details
- Born: 23 September 1959 (age 66) Melo, Uruguay
- Party: National Party
- Spouse: Liliana Rodríguez Beltrame
- Children: Pablo Aparicio, Agustín Alberto, Leandro Luis, Rodrigo Diego
- Education: University of the Republic

Pablo Iturralde Viñas (born 23 September 1959) is an Uruguayan politician and attorney. He served as President of the Board of the National Party from 2020 to 2024 and as National Representative from 2005 to 2020.

== Biography ==
Born in Melo, Iturralde graduated from the University of the Republic with a Law degree.

== Political career ==
He begins his political militancy in the Movement for the Fatherland. In the 1989 elections, he heads the list 430, "The Young Whites". During Luis Alberto Lacalle's government between 1990 and 1993, he was general labor inspector and from 1993 to 1995 he was the head of the National Directorate of Labor in the Ministry of Labour and Social Welfare. From 1995 to 2000, he was a substitute senator for the Wilsonist Current, embodied in Juan Andrés Ramírez's 903 list.

In 2003 he joined Senator Jorge Larrañaga's sector, supporting him as a pre-candidate in the 2004 presidential primaries; along with Javier García and Álvaro F. Lorenzo, they led the most voted list by Montevideo in June. Therefore, in the general election of that year, Iturralde led the list to deputies by the National Alliance sector, being elected to the Chamber of Representatives and Secretary of the Honorable Directory of the National Party.

In May 2020, he was elected President of the Board of the National Party, succeeding Pablo Abdala who resigned from the post to be the head of the Institute of Children and Adolescents of Uruguay.

Iturralde resigned in 2024 following the publication of a series of conversations with former senator Gustavo Penadés, who was indicted by the courts for sexual exploitation of minors. In a conversation with Penadés, Pablo Iturralde welcomed the appointment of a prosecutor whom he described as a “friend” in the investigation against the former parliamentarian.
