= Ope Pasquet =

Uruguayan political figure and lawyer (born 1956)

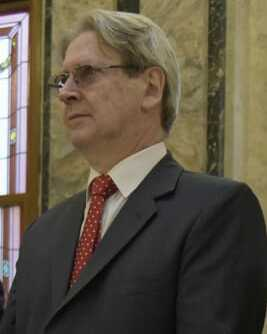

President of the Chamber of Representatives of Uruguay
- In office 1 March 2022 – 1 March 2023
- Preceded by: Alfredo Fratti
- Succeeded by: Sebastián Andújar

Representative of Uruguay for Montevideo
- Incumbent
- Assumed office 15 February 2015

Secretary General of the Colorado Party of Uruguay
- In office 4 April 2011 – 8 March 2012
- Preceded by: Pedro Bordaberry
- Succeeded by: Martha Montaner

Senator of Uruguay
- In office 15 February 2010 – 15 February 2015

Deputy Minister of Foreign Relations
- In office 22 February 1988 – 1 March 1990
- President: Julio María Sanguinetti

Personal details
- Born: Ope Pasquet Iribarne; 1 October 1956 (age 70) Montevideo, Uruguay
- Party: Colorado Party
- Spouse: Elena Martínez Rosso
- Children: 2
- Education: University of the Republic

Ope Pasquet Iribarne (born 10 January 1956) is a Uruguayan lawyer and politician of the Colorado Party.

== Political career ==
Pasquet is part of a generation of young politicians who began as opponents of the civic-military dictatorship (1973–85) and in the framework of the constitutional referendum of 1980 together with Enrique Tarigo. In 1984 they ran for the Chamber of Representatives for the Libertad y Cambio — List 85 sector, together with Luis Hierro López and Roberto Asiaín. The List obtained 5 seats, being the most voted party in Montevideo.

In 1988 he was appointed Deputy Minister of Foreign Relations by President Julio María Sanguinetti. In 2003 he founded the Open Batllismo sector in order to "rebuild the Colorado Party." In 2007 the group merged with Vamos Uruguay, a faction led by Bordaberry. In the 2009 general election he was elected Senator of the Republic for the 47th Legislature. From April 4, 2011, to March 8, 2012, he served as Secretary General of the Colorado Party.

In June 2013, during a parliamentary session remembering 40 years of the 1973 Uruguayan coup d'état, Pasquet brought forward the Colorado Party's need of self-criticism for its responsibility regarding these events. In the 2014 general election he endorsed Bordaberry for president and was elected National Representative for Montevideo. In 2015 he announced his departure from Vamos Uruguay, and said that the party lacked "political leadership".

In 2018, Pasquet was a founding member of Ciudadanos, a faction of the Colorado Party led by Ernesto Talvi. In the 2019 presidential primaries and general election, he endorsed Talvi for president and was re-elected National Representative. In early February 2022, it was announced that Ope Pasquet would succeed Alfredo Fratti as president of the Chamber of Representatives during the 3rd session (2022). He took office on March 1, and in his inaugural speech he stated that he would not set aside the "general criterion of prudence in spending".

He is the promoter of a bill to legalize Euthanasia and Medically Assisted Suicide.

== Personal life ==
Pasquet is married to Elena Martínez Rosso, judge and minister of the Supreme Court of Justice. They have two daughters Victoria and Florencia –who reached the semifinal of the fifth season of Got Talent Spain–.
