= Jaime Trobo =

Uruguayan politician (1956–2019)

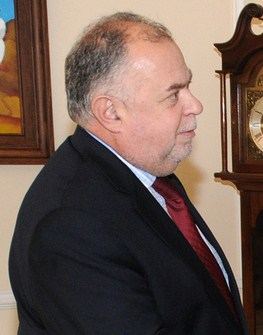

Minister of Sports and Youth
- In office 19 July 2000 – 13 November 2002
- Succeeded by: Leonardo Guzmán

Deputy of the Republic
- In office 1990–2019

Personal details
- Born: Jaime Mario Trobo; 5 October 1956 Canelones, Uruguay
- Died: 24 July 2019 (aged 62)
- Party: National Party
- Spouse: Ana María Bidegain
- Children: 3
- Occupation: Politician

Jaime Trobo (5 October 1956 – 24 July 2019) was an Uruguayan politician who served as a Deputy and as Minister of Sports and Youth pertaining to the National Party.

== Biography ==
He began military in White Youth in 1975, in opposition to the dictatorship. In 1982 he was elected conventional in the Herrerist sector along with who years later would become President of the Republic, Luis Alberto Lacalle.

In 1984 he was elected departmental mayor for Montevideo, a position he held between 1985 and 1989 when he was elected National Deputy for Montevideo on the list of Héctor Martín Sturla. He was reelected deputy in the elections of 1994, 1999, 2004, 2009 and 2014. In 1998 he chaired the Chamber of Deputies.

Between 2000 and 2002 he served as Minister of Sports and Youth in the government of Jorge Batlle.

In 2008 he chaired the International Affairs Committee of the House of Representatives.

He married Ana María Bidegain and they had three daughters.

Trobo suffered from cancer and in his last years he had traveled to Spain to get treatments for this disease. His last public appearance was on June 30, 2019, at the headquarters of Luis Lacalle Pou, on the occasion of the internal elections of 2019. He died on 24 July 2019 from a cancer.
