= Julio César Chalar =

Uruguayan lawyer and judge

Julio César Chalar (died 5 March 2016) was a Uruguayan lawyer and judge.

He had been a member of the Supreme Court of Justice since December 2012.
