= Supreme Court of Uruguay =

Supreme Court of Justice of the Oriental Republic of Uruguay
- Corte Suprema de Justicia de la República Oriental del Uruguay
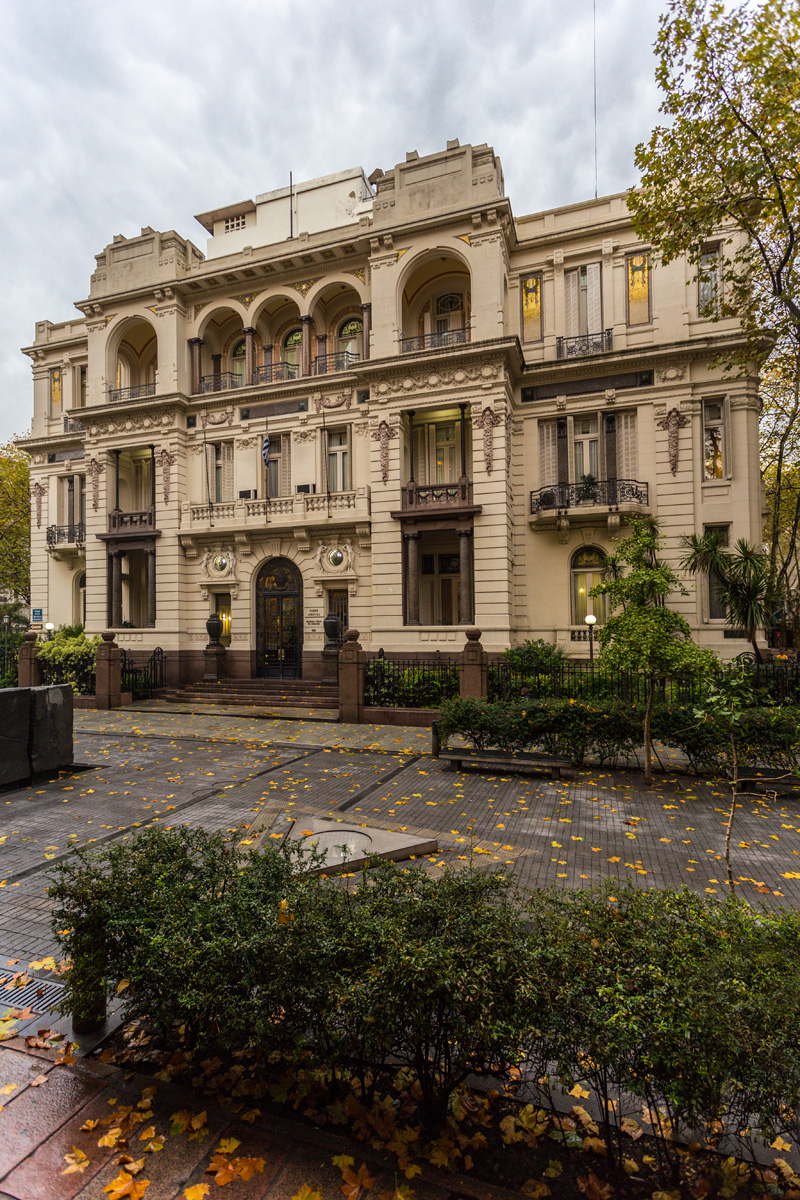
- Palacio Piria, seat of the Supreme Court
- Established: 28 October 1917; 108 years ago
- Location: Montevideo
- Composition method: Appointed by the General Assembly by two thirds of the votes.
- Authorised by: Uruguayan Constitution
- Judge term length: 10 years
- Number of positions: 5
- Website: poderjudicial.gub.uy

President of the Supreme Court
- Currently: Doris Morales Martínez
- Since: 2 February 2026; 7 months ago

The Supreme Court of Justice of Uruguay (Spanish: Suprema Corte de Justicia de Uruguay) is the highest court of law and last resort in the Oriental Republic of Uruguay. It serves as the highest appeals court, and appoints and oversees all other judges. Established on 28 October 1907, it is housed in the Palacio Piria, a masterpiece of eclectic architecture from 1917.

Article 235 of the Constitution establishes that members of the Supreme Court must be at least 40 years of age and either natural-born citizens or legal citizens with at least ten years of citizenship and twenty-five years of residence in the country. They must also have practiced law for a minimum of ten years or have served for at least eight years as a member of the Judiciary or the Public Ministry. Article 236 provides that justices are appointed by the General Assembly by a two-thirds vote of its full membership. Their term of office is ten years, and they are ineligible for re-election until five years have elapsed since the conclusion of their previous term. Their tenure also terminates upon reaching seventy years of age.

The presidency of the Court rotates annually among the justices, following the order of seniority in office.

== Powers and duties ==
According to Article 329 to the Supreme Court is assigned:

1. Judge all violators of the Constitution, without exception; offenses against the law of nations and cases in admiralty; questions relating to treaties, pacts and conventions with other States; and take cognizance of cases involving diplomatic Representatives in such cases as are contemplated in international law.
2. Exercise directive, corrective, advisory, and economic supervision over the Tribunals, Courts and other dependencies of the Judiciary.
3. Prepare the draft budgets of the Judicial Power and transmit them in due course to the Executive Power for inclusion in the draft of the general budget, together with such modifications as may be deemed appropriate.
4. With the approval of the Senate, or during its recess with that of the Permanent Commission, appoint the citizens who shall compose the Appellate Tribunals, such appointments to be contingent upon the following: a favorable vote of three of its members, for candidates who belong to the Judiciary or the Public Ministry; A favorable vote of four, for candidates not having the qualifications of the foregoing paragraph.
5. Appoint the Lawyer Judges of all grades and classes, an absolute majority of all members of the Supreme Court being required in each case.
6. Appoint the permanent Official Defenders and Justices of the Peace by absolute majority of all members of the Supreme Court of Justice.
7. Appoint, promote, or remove, by a vote of four of its members, the employees of the Judicial Power, in accordance with the provisions of Articles 58 to 66, wherever pertinent.
8. Perform such other duties as the law may prescribe.

== Membership ==
Ministers of the Supreme Court
Justice / birthdate and place	Start date / length of service	Succeeded			
Justice / birthdate and place	Start date / length of service	Succeeded	(President 2026); Doris Morales Martínez	8 February 2022; 4 years, 230 days	Tosi Boeri
John Pérez Brignani	15 December 2020; 5 years, 285 days	Turell Araquistain			
Bernadette Minvielle Sánchez	9 August 2017; 9 years, 48 days	Pérez Manrique			
Julio Alfredo Posada	1 December 2025; 299 days	Martínez Rosso			
Álvaro França	5 June 2026; 113 days	Sosa Aguirre			

=== Former members ===
Ministers of the Supreme Court
Name	Period	Name	Period	Name	Period
Carlos Fein	1907–1908	Edenes A. Mallo	1965–1974	Felipe Hounie	2015–2018
Domingo González	1907–1908	Velarde Cerdeiras	1967–1972	Elena Martínez Rosso	2015–2025
Luis Piera	1907–1910	Álvaro Méndez Modernell	1972–1974	Bernadette Minvielle Sánchez	2017–
Ezequiel Garzón	1907–1925	Rómulo Vago	1972–1978	Eduardo Turell Araquistain	2017–2020
Benito Cuñarro	1907–1928	Carlos Dubra	1972–1981	Luis Tosi	2018–2022
Luis Romeu Burgues	1908–1925	Sabino Dante Sabini	1973–1979	Tabaré Sosa Aguirre	2019–2026
Julio Bastos	1908–1929	Agustín de Vega	1974–1976	John Pérez Brignani	2020–
Pablo de María	1911–1914	Francisco José Márcora	1974–1978	Doris Morales Martínez	2022–
Abel Pinto	1914–1934	José Pedro Gatto de Souza	1976–1984	Julio Alfredo Posada	2025–
Ramón Montero Paullier	1925–1928	Enrique Frigerio	1978–1983	Álvaro França	2026–
Miguel V. Martínez	1925–1933	Ramiro López Rivas	1978–1984
Teófilo Piñeiro	1928–1931	José Pedro Igoa	1979–1981
Juan A. Méndez del Marco	1928–1939	Erik Colombo	1981–1982
Julio Guani	1929–1944	Sara Fons de Genta	1981–1985
Pedro Aladio	1931–1934	Juan José Silva Delgado	1983–1985
Juan Aguirre y González	1934–1940	Rafael Addiego Bruno	1984–1993
Mariano Pereira Núñez	1935–1938	Jacinta Balbela	1985–1989
Blas Vidal	1935–1938	Nelson Nicoliello	1985–1989
Román Álvarez Cortés	1938–1941	Armando Tommasino	1985–1992
Zoilo Saldías	1938–1942	Nelson García Otero	1985–1992
Jaime Cibils Larravide	1940–1942	Jorge Pessano	1989–1990
Juan José Aguiar	1940–1948	Jorge Marabotto	1990–2000
Amaro Carve Urioste	1941–1945	Luis Torello	1991–1998
José B. Nattino	1942–1947	Raúl Alonso de Marco	1992–2002
Juan M. Minelli	1942–1949	Juan Mariño Chiarlone	1993–2001
Eduardo Artecona	1944–1953	Milton Cairoli	1993–2003
Enrique Armand Ugón	1945–1952	Gervasio Guillot	1998–2003
Francisco Gamarra	1947–1953	Roberto Parga	2000–2007
Bolívar Baliñas	1949–1950	Leslie van Rompaey	2002–2012
Álvaro Macedo	1949–1959	Daniel Gutiérrez	2002–2012
Rivera Astigarraga	1951–1961	Pablo Troise	2003–2006
Manuel López Esponda	1952–1962	Hipólito Rodríguez Caorsi	2003–2009
Luis Alberto Bouza	1954–1964	Sara Bossio	2006–2008
Julio César De Gregorio	1954–1964	Julio César Chalar	2012–2014
Esteban Ruiz	1962–1967	Jorge Ruibal	2007–2015
Hamlet Reyes	1962–1972	Jorge Larrieux	2008–2016
Emilio Siemens Amaro	1962–1972	Jorge Chediak	2009–2019
Alberto Sánchez Rogé	1965–1973	Ricardo Pérez Manrique	2012–2017
