= Leslie van Rompaey =

Uruguayan lawyer and former judge (born 1946)

Leslie van Rompaey (born 21 December 1946, in Montevideo) is a Uruguayan lawyer and former judge.

From 2002 to 2012 he was a member of the Supreme Court of Justice, presiding over it 2004–2008.
