= Monument to the Cairoli Brothers =

- Monumento ai fratelli Cairoli
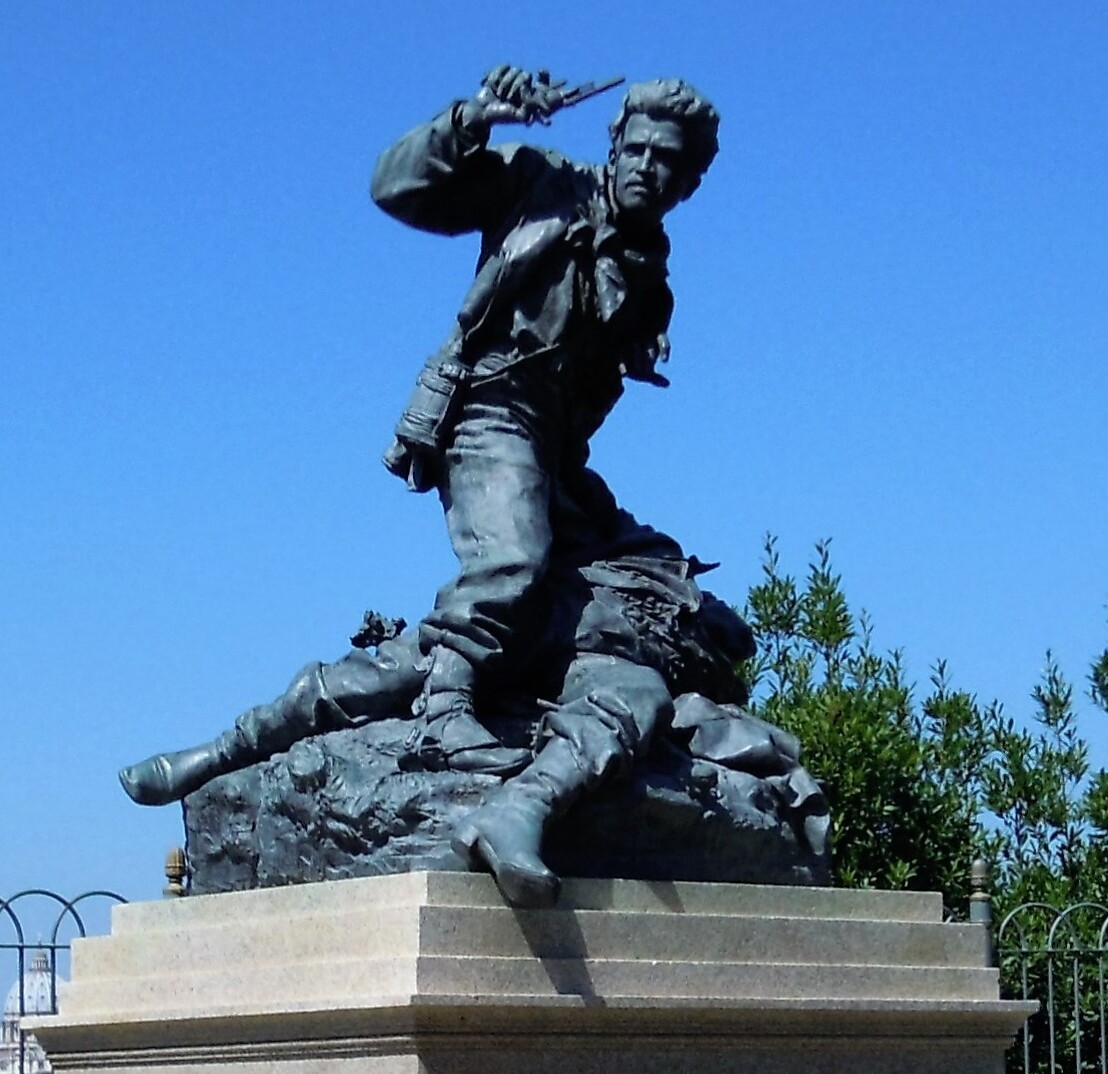
- The location of the monument today Click on the map to see marker.
- Location: Viale delle Trinita dei Monti, Pincian Hill, Rome, Italy
- Coordinates: 41°54′34″N 12°28′48″E
- Designer: Ercole Rosa
- Material: bronze and stone
- Completion date: 1872 (plaster model)
- Opening date: 1883 (bronze monument inaugurated)

The Monument to the Cairoli Brothers is a prominent patriotic statuary group on the Pincian Hill in Rome. It is located along the Pincian Hill, on a terrace overlooking the center of Rome. The statue is located just below the Terrazza Viale del Belvedere, and can be accessed by walking north from the summit of the Spanish Steps, past the Villa Medici.

== Description ==
A plaster model of this monument, designed by Ercole Rosa, was exhibited in 1872 in Fine Arts Exhibition of Rome. The city of Rome commissioned the sculptor to complete this bronze monument, and it was inaugurated on 27 May 1883.

The monument is meant to represent an event in the unification of Italy. Rosa himself had been part of the Garibaldian forces, attempting to occupy Rome in 1867, but who were routed at the Battle of Mentana some 4-5 miles northwest of Rome. The Cairoli brothers were part of a smaller contingent who contemporaneously reached Villa Glori in the northern suburbs of Rome, only to be surrounded by the Papal Zouaves. In the heated battle, Enrico Cairoli was killed. His brother Giovanni was wounded, and subsequently captured. Giovanni would die two years later, putatively of his wounds.

By then, the family story was known throughout Italy. Of five brothers Cairoli, originally from Pavia, four died fighting for Italian Independence: Ernesto (1833-1859) in 1859 at the Battle of Varese; Luigi in 1860 as part of the Expedition of the Thousand; Enrico in 1867 at Villa Glori, and Giovanni two years later from wounds he had received at Villa Glori. Numerous monuments, paintings, and memorials were created throughout Italy in the late 19th century memorializing the sacrifice of these brothers. The fifth brother, Benedetto Cairoli, also fought in the Wars of Italian Independence, and later would serve as Prime Minister of Italy, as well as other major leadership positions.

The monument depicts Giovanni, gun in the air, still bravely defiant despite the limp body of his brother below him. One hand holds his dead brother in grief, the other threatens battle to the enemy. At the base or plinth are the names of the 70 soldiers who accompanied the Cairoli at Villa Glori. The draped flag over a block engraved with SPQR recalls the group's efforts to liberate Rome or die trying. The arrangement of two soldiers, one dead and one defiant, recalls the hellenistic model of Menelaus supporting the body of Patroclus found in the Loggia dei Lanzi in Florence. A similar arrangement was pursued in the 1898 Monument of Piazza Mentana in FLorence.
