= Sara Bossio =

Uruguayan lawyer and former judge

Sara Bossio (born 7 April 1938 in Montevideo) is a Uruguayan lawyer and former judge.

From 2006 to 2008 she was a member of the Supreme Court of Justice, presiding over it in 2007–2008.
