= Alfredo Fratti =

Uruguayan politician (born 1956)

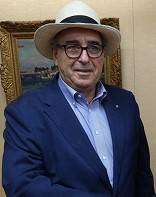
- 2025 photo of Alfredo Fratti

President of the Chamber of Representatives
- In office 1 March 2021 – 1 March 2022
- Preceded by: Martín Lema
- Succeeded by: Ope Pasquet

National Representative
- Incumbent
- Assumed office 15 February 2015
- Constituency: Cerro Largo
- In office 15 February 2005 – 15 February 2010
- Constituency: Cerro Largo

Personal details
- Born: Luis Alfredo Fratti Silveira; 1956 (age 69–70) Cerro Largo, Uruguay
- Party: Movement of Popular Participation
- Other political affiliations: Broad Front

Luis Alfredo Fratti Silveira (born 1956) is a Uruguayan politician and veterinarian of the Movement of Popular Participation – Broad Front, serving as National Representative for Cerro Largo Department since 15 February 2015. He served as president of the Chamber of Representatives from 1 March 2021 to 1 March 2022.

Fratti was a deputy between 2005 and 2010. During the government of José Mujica he was director of the National Meat Institute.
