= Hipólito Rodríguez Caorsi =

Uruguayan lawyer and judge

Hipólito Rodríguez Caorsi (July 10, 1939 in Montevideo – December 15, 2012) was a Uruguayan lawyer and judge.

In September 1992 he was appointed as a member of the Supreme Court of Justice, a post in which he remained until 2002.

He died in 2012, and is buried at Cementerio del Norte, Montevideo.
