= Ciccio Troise =

Italian football coach (born 1972)

- Troise with Uzbekistan in 2026

Personal information
- Full name: Francesco Troise
- Date of birth: 5 February 1972 (age 54)
- Place of birth: Santa Lucia, Naples, Italy
- Position: Midfielder

Team information
- Current team: Uzbekistan (assistant coach)

Francesco "Ciccio" Troise (born 5 February 1972) is an Italian football coach and former midfielder. Born in Naples, he has worked in Italy, England, Saudi Arabia, China and Croatia, as well as at international level. He has worked extensively as a member of Fabio Cannavaro's coaching staff and currently serves as an assistant coach with the Uzbekistan national football team.

== Career ==
Troise was born in the Santa Lucia district of Naples. A former midfielder, he began coaching in Campania, with early experiences at Virtus Volla, Arzanese, Nola, Scafatese and Torrecuso. In 2013, he joined Giuseppe Sannino's staff at Chievo Verona as a technical collaborator. In December 2013, Troise followed Sannino to English Championship club Watford, where he worked as part of the first-team coaching staff. He left Watford in 2014 and later joined Sannino's staff at Catania.

In 2015, Troise began working with Fabio Cannavaro in Asia, joining the coaching staff of Guangzhou Evergrande. In October 2015, Troise joined Cannavaro's staff at Saudi Arabian club Al Nassr. In 2016, Troise moved to Tianjin Quanjian, working as an assistant coach on Cannavaro's staff. The club won promotion to the Chinese Super League during their time there. He returned to Guangzhou in 2017. During his second spell he worked as an assistant coach, and was part of the staff when Guangzhou won the 2019 Chinese Super League. In 2019, while working at Guangzhou, Troise also worked with Cannavaro's staff at the China national football team during Cannavaro's brief spell in charge of the senior national side.

In September 2022, Troise returned to Italy as part of Cannavaro's staff at Benevento. He remained with the club until the departure of Cannavaro and his staff in February 2023. In April 2024, Troise joined Udinese with Cannavaro. Cannavaro's staff took charge while Udinese were involved in a relegation battle and remained until the end of the 2023–24 Serie A season, with the club retaining its top-flight status.

At the end of 2024, Troise joined Croatian club Dinamo Zagreb as part of Cannavaro's coaching staff, remaining there until April 2025. In October 2025, Troise joined Cannavaro's staff with the Uzbekistan national football team. Uzbekistan had already secured the country's first qualification for the 2026 FIFA World Cup before the appointment of Cannavaro's staff.
