= Jorge Machiñena =

Uruguayan politician (1936–2007)

Jorge Machiñena (April 17, 1936 – December 30, 2007), was an Uruguayan politician. He was born in Montevideo.

== Political alignment; Deputy ==
He was a member of the National Party, in the "Herrerismo" sector, led by Luis Alberto Lacalle. He was elected as a Deputy in the 1984 elections, and he occupied his seat from 1985 until 1990.

In the 1989 elections, Lacalle was elected President of the Republic, and Machiñena was reelected as a Deputy for his party. He remained in this post from 1990 to 1995.

Machiñena quit the "Herrerismo" sector and joined another group within the National Party, led by Alberto Volonté. In the 1994 elections Machiñena was re-elected for a third time as a Deputy. He occupied the seat between 1995 and 2000.

== President of the Chamber of Representatives ==
He left the General Assembly of Uruguay in February 2000, having been elected by his peers for a one-year term as the President of the Chamber of Deputies of Uruguay from March 1, 1996 - March 1, 1997.

== Death ==
In 2007, Machiñena died of a heart attack. His remains are buried at Cementerio del Buceo, Montevideo.
