= Carlos Abdala =

Uruguayan politician and diplomat

Uruguayan Ambassador to Paraguay
- In office 1975–1976

Uruguayan Minister of Labour and Social Affairs
- In office 1972–1973

Personal details
- Born: 1930; Uruguay
- Died: 1976; Paraguay

Carlos Abdala (1930–1976) was a Uruguayan politician and diplomat.

== Career ==
He served as Minister of Labour and Social Affairs. Later he was appointed Ambassador in Paraguay, a country where he was mistakenly assassinated by a Croatian Revolutionary Brotherhood terrorist who reportedly believed he was shooting at the Yugoslav ambassador.

== Personal life ==
His son Pablo is currently a national representative.
