= Felipe Seade =

- Born: Felipe Seade; 1912; Antofagasta, Chile
- Died: January 18, 1969 (aged 56–57); Montevideo, Uruguay
- Education: Fine Arts Circle School
- Known for: Painting, Muralism, Teaching
- Notable work: Alegoría al Trabajo (1936); La marcha del Pueblo à la Piedra Alta (1939)
- Style: Social Realism, Muralism

Felipe Seade (1912 – 18 January 1969) was a painter and teacher of Lebanese descent who spent most of his life in Uruguay.

== Biography ==
Seade was born in Antofagasta, Chile, the elder son of a Lebanese immigrant family. Eleven years later his whole family moved to Montevideo, Uruguay. At the age of 12 Seade began working as an assistant to the Muralist Enrique Albertazzi and the painter Guillermo Rodríguez. Under Rodríguez' influence Seade took some painting courses at the Fine Arts Circle school. He had his first show in 1925. From 1931 well into the 1950s Seade presented work in many national and city halls.

In 1944, Seade began his parallel career as a teacher. He first work as teacher of drawing at the Liceo de Colonia, where he managed to paint the large mural, Alegoría al Trabajo (1936), and later as a professor of the Montevideo Fine Arts School, where he taught for 25 years.

It is impossible to understand Seade's artistic life without a reference to his political life. He wanted to paint for "the people, not for the walls of the bourgeoisie". He aspired to paint murals, the preferred way for his generation to reach the masses, but the only murals he managed to finish were the one in Colonia and the La marcha del Pueblo à la Piedra Alta (1939) at the Conference Hall of the Liceo de Florida. However, a significant part or Seade's work is formed by his sketches of murals and preparity sketches for murals.

Thematically, Seade mostly sought to represent the characters of Uruguayan life – washing women, Gauchos, soccer fans, kids and women. Not from a tourist perspective, which he despised, but with the passion of a convinced social realist.

Seade was also an expert draughtsman. His most public work was a long series of illustrations for a key local magazine, Mundo Uruguayo. His more private drawings were mostly sketches for paintings.

Although Seade had an active participation in Salons and through his teaching was one of the more visible artists of Uruguay in his time, he disliked and avoided the world of galleries and art critics. This is probably one reason why after his death he has remained in relative obscurity. Important critics and historians such as Gabriel Peluffo Linari, Fernando García Esteban and Atahualpa del Cioppo have recognised Seade's cultural importance.

== See also ==
- Lebanese Uruguayan
