= Fray Marcos =

- Town
- Location in Uruguay
- Coordinates: 34°11′0″S 55°44′0″W
- Country: Uruguay
- Department: Florida Department
- Founded: 1888

Population (2011)
  - Total: 2,398
- Time zone: UTC −3
- Postal code: 90601
- Dial plan: +598 4311 (+4 digits)

Fray Marcos is a town in the Florida Department of southern-central Uruguay.

== Geography ==
It is located 2 kilometres (1.2 mi) north of the Santa Lucía River (the border with Canelones Department) and on the junction of Route 7 with Route 94. It is 96 kilometres (60 mi) north of Montevideo and on kilometre 107 of the railroad track Montevideo – Nico Pérez.

== History ==
It was founded in December 1888, and on 23 May 1919, it was declared a "Pueblo" (village) by the Act of Ley Nº 6.906. Its status was elevated to "Villa" (town) on 5 July 1956 by the Act of Ley Nº 12.297.

== Population ==
In 2011 Fray Marcos had a population of 2,398.

Year	Population
1963	1,403
1975	1,568
1985	1,676
1996	2,053
2004	2,509
2011	2,398

Source: Instituto Nacional de Estadística de Uruguay

== Places of worship ==
- Most Pure Heart of Mary Parish Church (Roman Catholic)
