= Pablo Abdala =

Uruguayan lawyer and politician

President of the Institute of Children and Adolescents of Uruguay
- Incumbent
- Assumed office 1 April 2020
- President: Luis Alberto Lacalle Pou
- Preceded by: Marisa Lindner

President of the National Party
- In office 9 March 2020 – 31 March 2020
- Preceded by: Beatriz Argimón
- Succeeded by: Pablo Iturralde

Representative of Uruguay for Montevideo
- In office 15 February 2005 – 15 February 2020

Personal details
- Born: 14 July 1966 (age 59) Montevideo, Uruguay
- Political party: National Party; National Alliance
- Spouse: Adriana Ibarra
- Children: Juan Ignacio, Federica, Inés.
- Parent: Carlos Abdala
- Education: University of the Republic
- Occupation: Lawyer, professor, politician

Pablo Daniel Abdala Schwarz (born 14 July 1966) is a Uruguayan lawyer and politician of the National Party (PN), serving as President of the Institute of Children and Adolescents of Uruguay (INAU) since 1 April 2020.

Born in Montevideo, Abdala attended Seminary College, graduated from University of the Republic, with a law degree.

== Biography ==
=== Early life ===
He is a son of Carlos Abdala, a politician and diplomat. Pablo lived part of his childhood in Paraguay, because his father served as Ambassador of Uruguay to that country. In his native country he attended the Ivy Thomas Memorial School and the Seminary College, completing their primary and secondary studies respectively.

=== Political career ===
He has been a member of the National Party since 1982. He served as secretary of the Herrerism youth in 1988. One year later, he was appointed as the first candidate of the Herrerism faction for the Legislature of Montevideo. In the 2004 elections, he was elected national representative by list 71 in Montevideo. On February 15, 2005, he assumed as Deputy for the department of Montevideo for the 46th. Legislature (2005-2010). He was reelected for the 47th (2010-2015) and the 48th legislature (2015-2020).

In 2019, he supported the pre-candidate Jorge Larrañaga facing the presidential primaries and also integrates the "Live without Fear" Commission, promoting a referendum in search of improving public security in Uruguay. In 2020, he briefly held the Presidency of the National Party, between March 9 and 31. He succeeded Beatriz Argimón who took office as Vice President of the Republic and resigned after being appointed president of INAU.

From 1996 to 1998 he taught political science at the Military School.
