= Pablo Troise =

Uruguayan lawyer and judge (born 1936)

Pablo Troise (born 17 April 1936) is a Uruguayan lawyer and former judge.

From 2003 to 2006 he was a member of the Supreme Court of Uruguay.
