= Jorge Ruibal =

Uruguayan lawyer and judge

Jorge Ruibal Pino (born 6 June 1945 in Montevideo) is a Uruguayan lawyer and judge.

Since 2007 he is a member of the Supreme Court of Justice, presiding over it 2008-2009 and again since 2013.
