= Héctor Martín Sturla =

Uruguayan lawyer and politician

Héctor Martín Sturla Berhouet (Montevideo, 13 July 1953 - 22 April 1991) was a Uruguayan lawyer and politician.

A man of the National Party, he supported Luis Alberto Lacalle and Jorge Machiñena, and he was elected to Parliament in November 1984. In the following election, with Lacalle elected President of the Republic, Sturla was appointed President of the Chamber of Deputies of Uruguay in 1990.

He died in 1991. Nowadays there is a square with his name in Montevideo and a political group of the National Party.

His youngest brother Daniel, a Salesian cleric, is the current archbishop of Montevideo.
