= Washington Abdala =

Uruguayan lawyer and politician

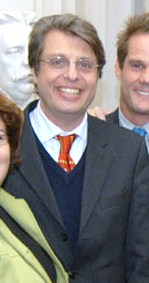
Image of Dip. Washington Abdala

Manuel Juan Washington Abdala Remerciari, a.k.a. el Turco (born 8 September 1959, in Montevideo) is a Uruguayan lawyer and politician.

He was a National Representative for the Colorado Party from 1995 till 2010. In 2000, with Jorge Batlle elected President of the Republic, Abdala was appointed President of the Chamber of Deputies of Uruguay, and he served from 2000 to 2001.

Lately he is devoted to television and stand-up comedy shows.
