= Lebanon–Uruguay relations =

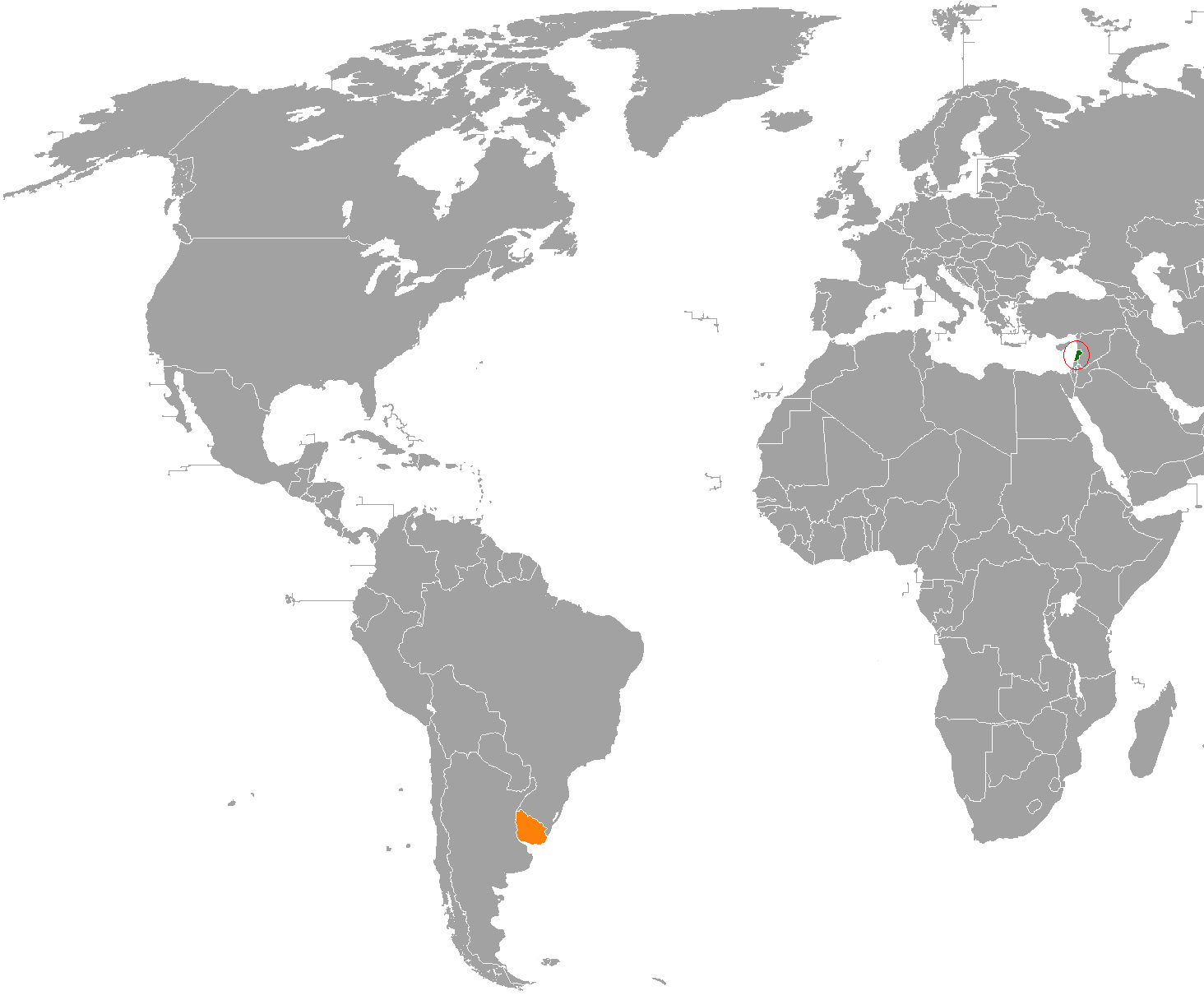
- Lebanon: Uruguay

Uruguay recognized Lebanon's independence on November 22, 1943. Both countries established diplomatic relations on October 25, 1945. Lebanon has an embassy in Montevideo. and a Uruguay has an embassy in Beirut.

Both countries are members of the Group of 77.

== Lebanese in Uruguay ==
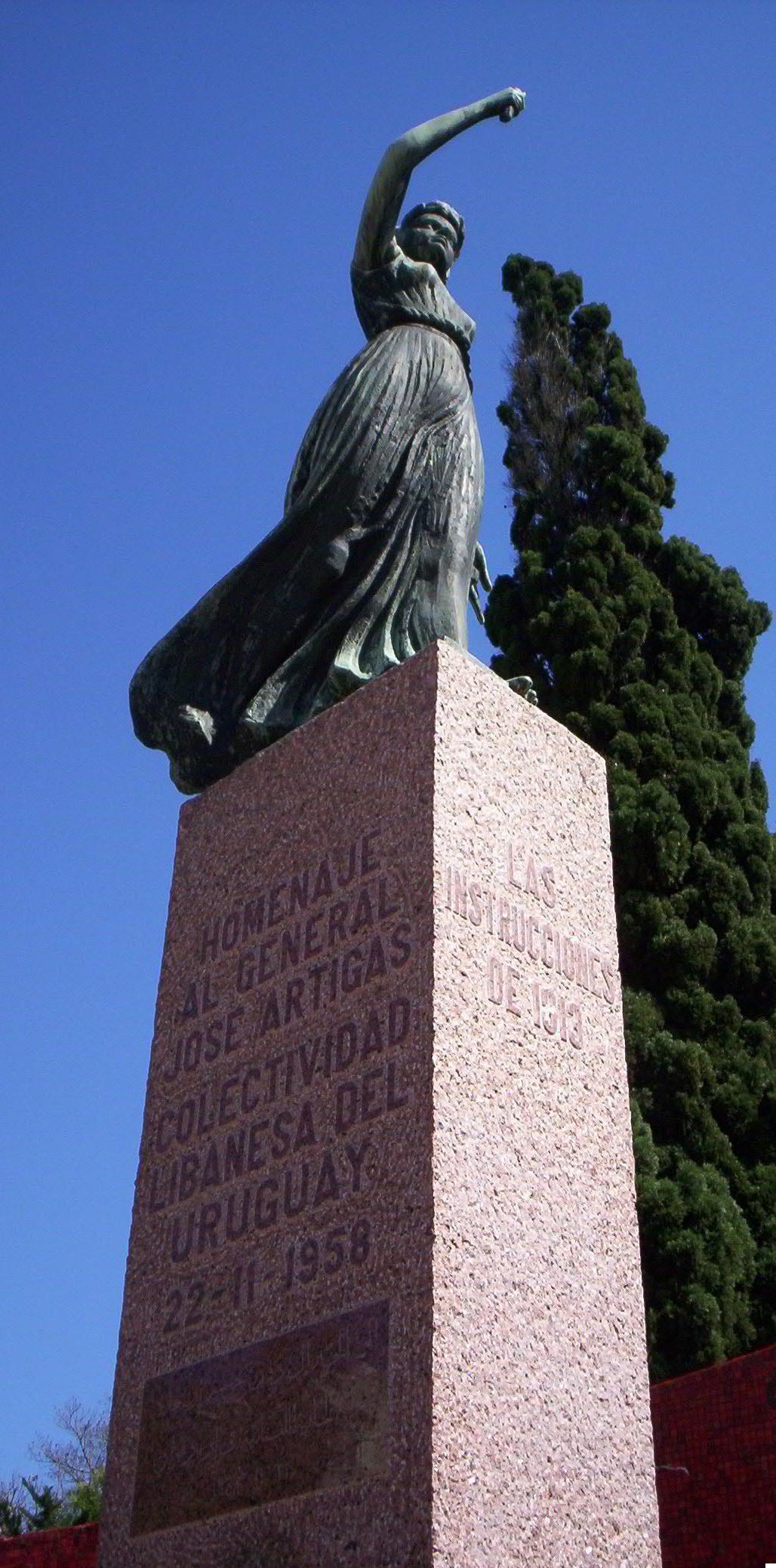
Memorial to the Uruguayan national hero José Gervasio Artigas, dedicated by the Lebanese community in Uruguay.

The first Lebanese immigrants to Uruguay arrived in the 1860s. In 1954, there were 15,000 people of Lebanese descent living in Uruguay. By 2009, the number had grown to about 55,000. In 1997, Uruguay's house speaker noted that its 99-seat parliament contains two members of Lebanese origin, including himself.

== History ==
In 1924, Uruguay established an honorary consulate in Beirut, and on November 16, 1928, made it a consulate general for the State of Greater Lebanon and Syria. On October 25, 1945, the Government of Uruguay was one of the first countries to open diplomatic relations with the newly independent state of Lebanon, upgrading their Beirut mission to an embassy. In 1954 the Lebanese President Camille Chamoun visited Uruguay. On May 31, 1954, he signed the first treaty between the two countries in Montevideo.

From 1946 to 1963, Lebanon was represented in Uruguay by an honorary consulate of Lebanon in Montevideo. From 1963, Lebanon was represented through their Embassy of Lebanon Buenos Aires, Argentina. In 1971, Lebanon established a diplomatic mission in Montevideo, with representation at the ambassadorial level.

In December 1999, Zafer El-Hasan, secretary general of the Lebanese Foreign Ministry, held bilateral talks with Uruguayan Deputy Foreign Minister Roberto Rodriguez Pioli about enhancing relations between the two countries in the political, economic and cultural fields. Pioli was visiting Lebanon with a delegation of businessmen of Lebanese origin. The two representatives signed an agreement on cultural cooperation.

There has been controversy in Uruguay about relations with Lebanon. Julio María Sanguinetti of the Partido Colorado, president from 1995 to 2000, said in an interview after losing power that Uruguay was wrong to support Lebanon in disputes with Israel due to Lebanon's failure to combat terrorism.

In May 2007 the Lebanese president Emile Lahoud decorated the outgoing Ambassador of Uruguay, Vos Alberto Rubio, with the National Order of the Cedar, in gratitude for to his diplomatic work. The ambassador later inaugurated a bust of José Artigas, the liberator of Uruguay, commemorating almost 49 years of uninterrupted diplomatic relations between the two countries. Later in 2007 Jorge Luis Jure Arnoletti became the new Uruguayan Ambassador to Lebanon.

Following the surprise election of pro a western government in Lebanon during June 2009, Uruguay congratulated the President Michel Suleiman, the new government, and the people of Lebanon saying they hoped recent developments would unite them with very close ties.

In April 2011, Foreign Minister Luis Almagro made an official visit to Lebanon and other countries in the Middle East.

== Lebanon-Israel conflicts ==
Uruguay has consistently supported Lebanon in disputes with Israel. When the 1978 South Lebanon conflict broke out, the Uruguay parliament was the only one in South America to take a decision demanding implementation of the 1978 United Nations Security Council Resolution 425, calling on Israel to immediately withdraw its forces from Lebanon. During the 2006 Lebanon War, five Uruguayan families of Lebanese origin were caught up in the conflict, but managed to escape from Lebanon to Syria. Uruguay coordinated with Venezuela to evacuate their citizens. Uruguayan Foreign Minister Reinaldo Gargano stated that Israel should cease fire and begin talks with Lebanon under the supervision of the United Nations.

== Trade ==
Trade between Lebanon and Uruguay is skewed in favor of Uruguay, which maintains a trade surplus of approximately $7.7 million as of 2024. Total bilateral trade volume reached approximately $9.1 million in 2024, driven by steady growth in exports from both nations over the preceding five-year period.

Between 2019 and 2024, Uruguayan exports to Lebanon expanded at an annualized rate of 19.0%, rising from $3.52 million to $8.4 million. The primary commodities exported by Uruguay to Lebanon include packaged medicaments ($2.96 million), concentrated milk ($2.83 million), and bovine meat ($1.53 million).

During the same five-year period, Lebanese exports to Uruguay grew at an annualized rate of 16.6%, increasing from $323,000 in 2019 to $695,000 in 2024. Lebanon's main exports to Uruguay consist of raw tobacco ($338,000), processed fruits and nuts ($117,000), and medical instruments ($47,700).

== Resident diplomatic missions ==
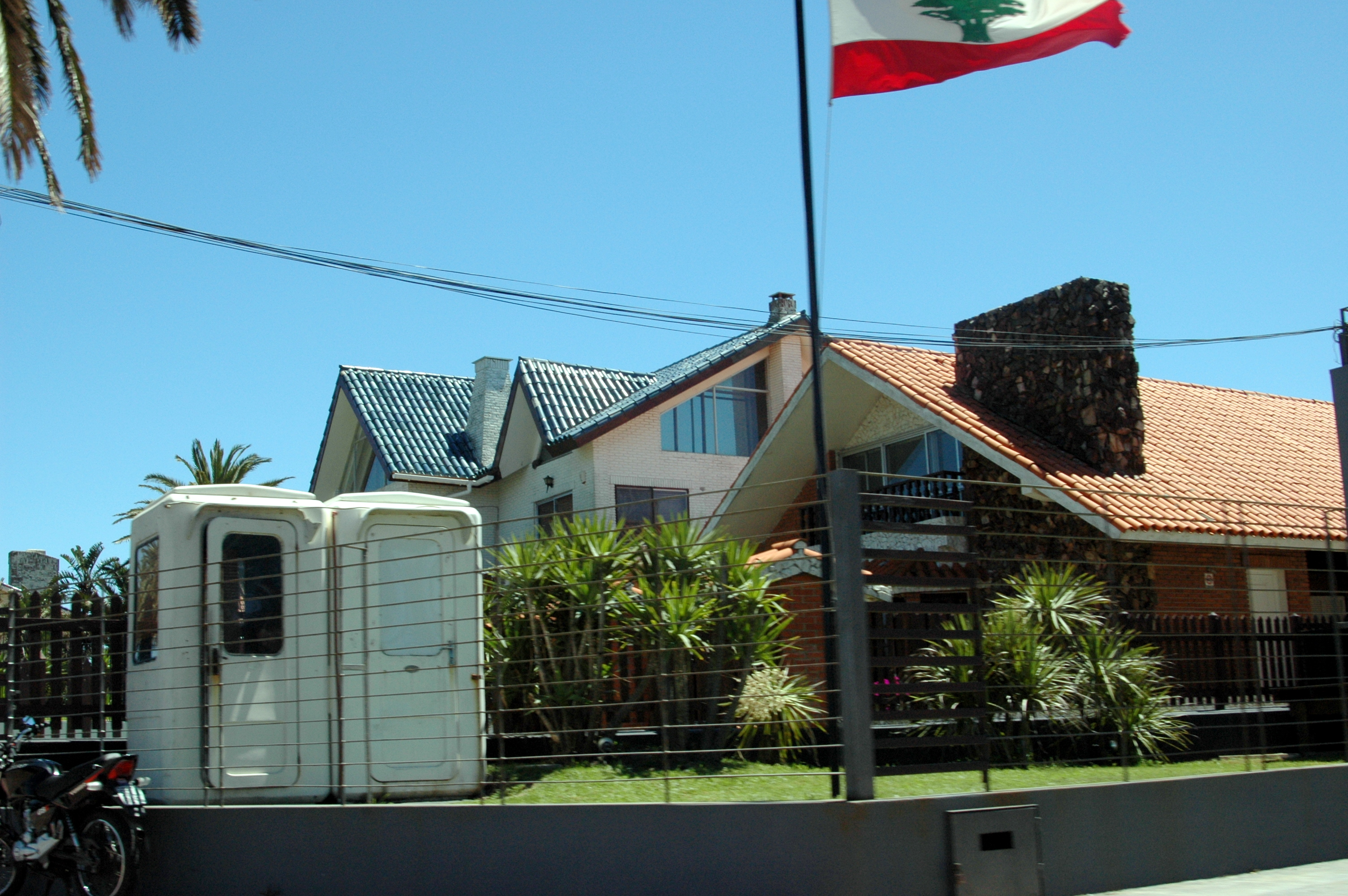
Residence of the Ambassador of Lebanon in Uruguay

- Lebanon has an embassy in Montevideo.
- Uruguay has an embassy in Beirut.

== See also ==
- Foreign relations of Lebanon
- Foreign relations of Uruguay
- Lebanese diaspora
