= Milton Cairoli =

Uruguayan lawyer and former judge

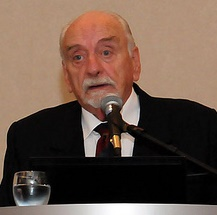
Milton Cairoli.

Milton Cairoli (born 12 June 1933) is a Uruguayan lawyer and former judge.

From 1993 to 2003 he was a member of the Supreme Court of Justice, presiding over it in 1997 and 2001.

== Publications ==
- Reflexiones sobre la Ley de Seguridad Ciudadana (with Ricardo Pérez Manrique)
