= Antonio Marchesano (politician) =

Uruguayan lawyer and politician (1930–2019)

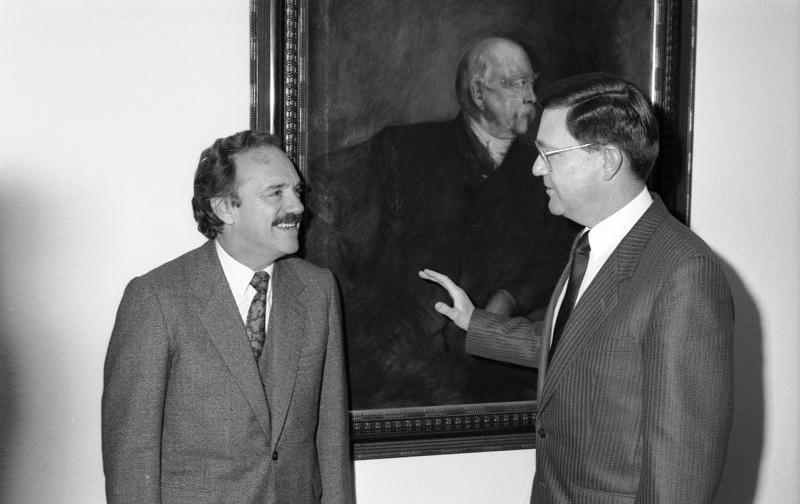
Uruguayan Interior Minister Antonio Marchesano (left) is received by German deputy Interior Minister Carl-Dieter Spranger.

Antonio Marchesano (7 November 1930 – 24 January 2019) was a Uruguayan lawyer and politician.

== Early life ==
Marchesano was born in Montevideo in 1930. A man of the Colorado Party, he was elected to the Chamber of Deputies in 1966. During the last years of the civic-military dictatorship he supported Julio María Sanguinetti, who was elected president in November 1984; then, Marchesano was once again elected to the Chamber of Deputies. In February 1985 he assumed as President of the Chamber of Deputies of Uruguay. Later, in April 1986, he was appointed Interior Minister. He died in Montevideo on January 24, 2019.
