= Jorge Larrieux =

Uruguayan lawyer and judge (born 1946)

Jorge Larrieux (born 26 November 1946, in Montevideo) is a Uruguayan lawyer and judge.

Since 2008, Larrieux has been a member of the Supreme Court of Justice, presiding over it in 2009.
