= Amir Hamed =

Uruguayan writer, essayist and translator

Amir Hamed (11 May 1962 – 20 November 2017) was a Uruguayan writer, essayist and translator.

== Background and education ==
Born in Montevideo, he earned a degree in literature from the University of the Republic and a doctorate in Hispanoamerican literature from Northwestern University.

== Works ==
Novels

- Artigas Blues Band (1994)
- Troya Blanda (1996)
- Semidiós (2001)
- Febrero 30 (2016)

Stories

- ¿Qué nos ponemos esta noche? (1992)
- Buenas noches, América (2003)

Essays

- Retroescritura (1998)
- Orientales: Uruguay a través de su poesía Siglo XX (1996)
- Mal y neomal. Rudimentos de geoidiocia (2007)
- Porno y post porno (2009, in collaboration with Roberto Echavarren and Ercole Lissardi)

Translations

- The Two Noble Kinsmen by William Shakespeare and John Fletcher

== See also ==
Uruguayan literature
