= Battle of Mentana =

Part of the Unification of Italy (1867)

- Part of the Unification of Italy
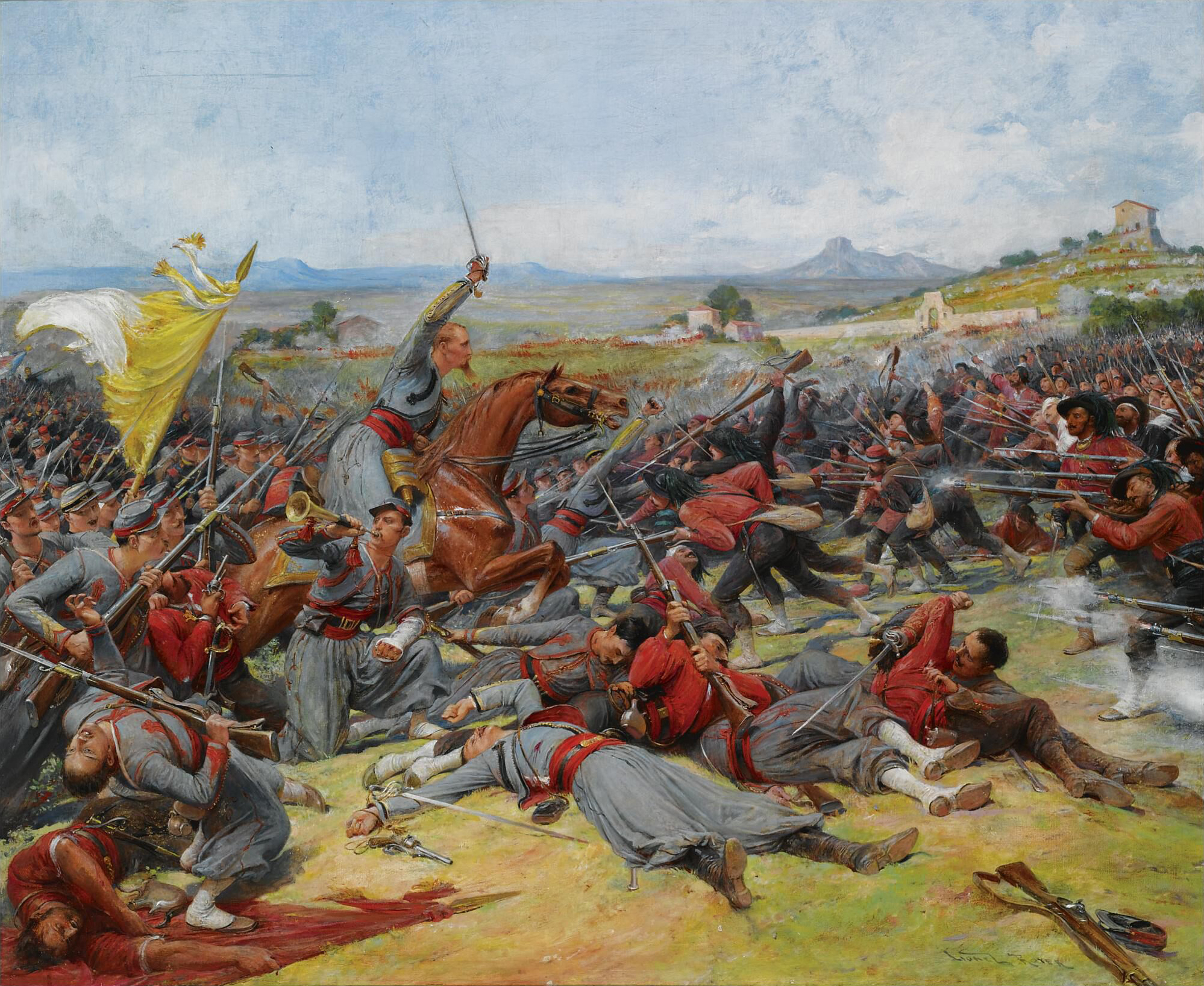
- "The Battle Near Mentana" by Lionel Royer, 1907.
Date	3 November 1867
Location	Near Mentana, modern Italy
Result	Franco-Papal victory

Belligerents
Italian volunteers	France; Papal States

Commanders and leaders
(Kingdom of Italy) Giuseppe Garibaldi	(Papal States) Hermann Kanzler (France) Balthazar Alban Gabriel, baron de Polhès

Strength
Uncertain: 4,000; 8,100; 10,000	Uncertain: 5,000; 5,500;

Casualties and losses
1,100 killed & wounded 800–1,000 captured	Papal: 144 killed & wounded French: 2 killed & 36 wounded

The Battle of Mentana was fought on November 3, 1867, near the village of Mentana, located north-east of Rome (then in the Papal States, now modern Lazio), between French-Papal troops and the Italian volunteers led by Giuseppe Garibaldi. Garibaldi's troops tried to capture Rome, which was at that time the main Italian city not yet incorporated into the newly unified Kingdom of Italy. The battle ended in victory for the French-Papal troops, maintaining the independence of the Papal States until 1870.

== Background ==
When the first Parliament of the Kingdom of Italy met in Turin, Victor Emmanuel II of Savoy was proclaimed King of Italy on March 17, 1861, and Rome was declared capital of Italy on March 27, 1861. However, the Italian government could not take its seat in Rome because Emperor Napoleon III maintained a French garrison there to prop up Pope Pius IX. This created an unstable political situation that led to much strife, both internal and external. In 1862 Giuseppe Garibaldi organized an expedition from Sicily, under the slogan Roma o Morte (Rome or Death) that attempted to take Rome. However, after crossing the Straits of Messina, the expedition was stopped at Aspromonte (known as the Aspromonte incident of 1862) by Italian troops. Garibaldi was wounded, taken prisoner, but subsequently released. Opposition to the expedition was forced on the Italian government by Napoleon III, who threatened military intervention if Garibaldi were not stopped.

On September 15, 1864, the September Convention was signed by the Italian government and Napoleon III. The Italian government agreed to protect the Papal States against external menaces and agreed to move the capital of Italy from Turin to Florence. The French garrison would be withdrawn from Rome within two years, during which time the Papal army would reorganize itself into a credible force. This unpopular agreement led to numerous riots (primarily in Turin which objected to its loss of status) and to renewed demands for the Italian government to take possession of its capital, Rome.

== Garibaldi's expedition ==
On August 12, 1866, in the aftermath of the Third Italian War of Independence, Italy gained Mantua and Veneto. Now only Rome and its neighbourhood were missing to complete the territorial unity of the state. In December of the same year, the last French battalions embarked from Civitavecchia to France.

On September 9, 1867, at a congress in Geneva, Garibaldi declared that the papacy was "the negation of God ... shame and plague of Italy". At the time, his popularity was at its apex, since he was the only Italian general who had obtained significant successes during the last war against Austria. He was therefore left free to organize a small army of about 10,000 volunteers. The plan was to march against Rome, while a riot was to break out inside the city.

However, Garibaldi's overt moves allowed Napoleon III to send a relief force in time to Rome. Apart from this official support, the Papal army was at the time composed mostly of French and European volunteers.

== Invasion of Lazio ==
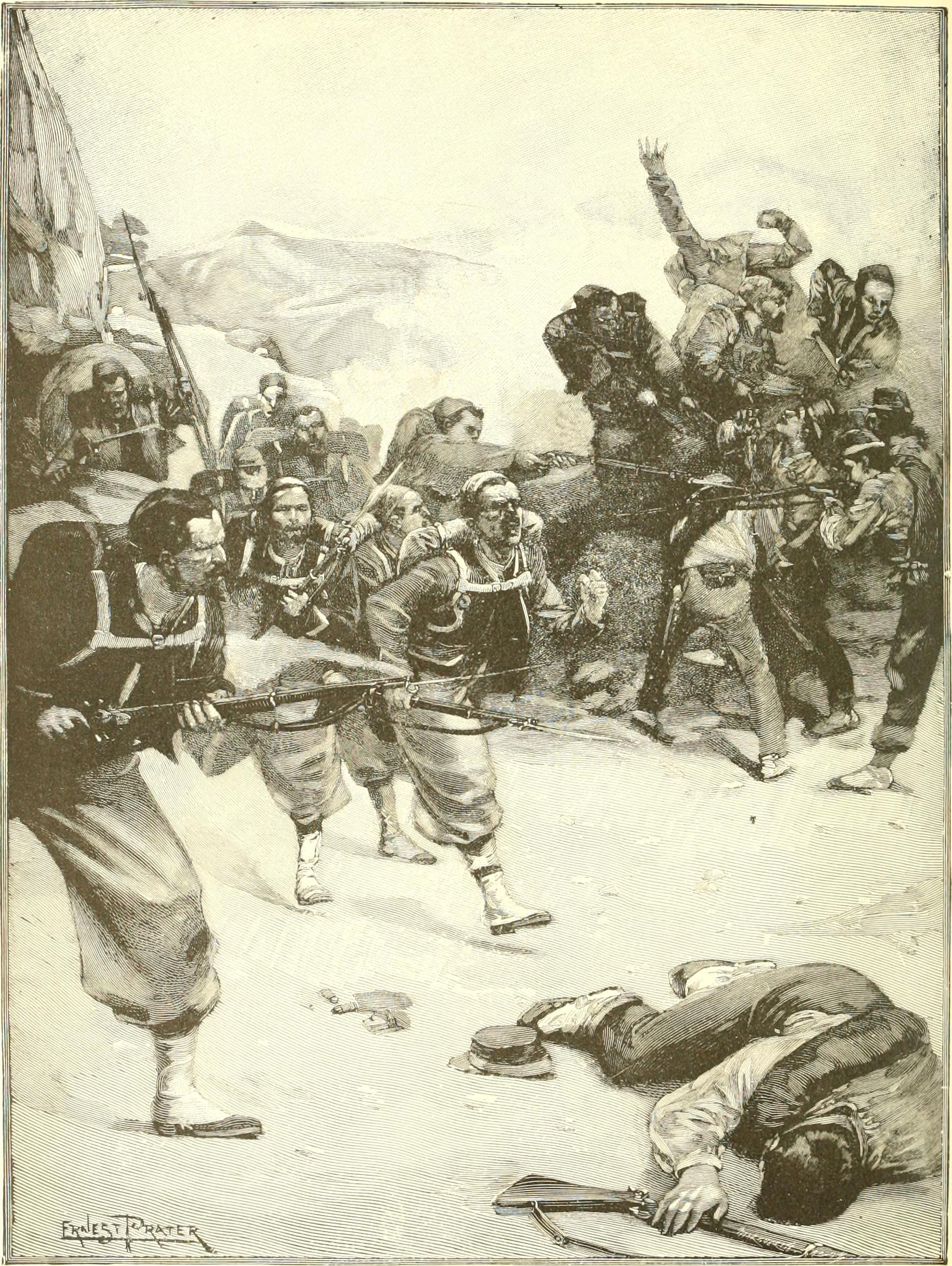
Victory of French Zouaves

Garibaldi's volunteers invaded Lazio, the region that contains Rome, in October 1867. A small contingent, led by Enrico Cairoli with his brother Giovanni and 70 companions, made a daring attempt to take Rome. The group embarked in Terni and floated down the Tiber. Their arrival in Rome was to coincide with an uprising inside the city. On 22 October 1867, the revolutionaries inside Rome seized control of the Capitoline Hill and of Piazza Colonna. In the meantime, Giuseppe Monti and Gaetano Tognetti let explode a mine under the Serristori barracks in Borgo, which was the seat of the Papal Zouaves, devastating the building and killing 27 persons. However, when the Cairolis and their companions arrived at Villa Glori, on the northern outskirts of Rome, the uprising had already been suppressed. During the night of 22 October 1867, the group was surrounded by Papal Zouaves, and Giovanni was severely wounded. Enrico was mortally wounded and bled to death in Giovanni's arms.

At the summit of Villa Glori, near the spot where Enrico died, there is a plain white column dedicated to the Cairoli brothers and their 70 companions. About 100 metres (110 yd) to the left of the top of the Spanish Steps, there is a bronze monument of Giovanni holding the dying Enrico in his arm. A plaque lists the names of their companions. Giovanni never recovered from his wounds and from the tragic events of 1867. According to an eyewitness, when Giovanni died on 11 September 1869:

In the last moments, he had a vision of Garibaldi and seemed to greet him with enthusiasm. I heard (so says a friend who was present) him say three times: "The union of the French to the Papal political supporters was the terrible fact!" he was thinking about Mentana. Many times he called Enrico, that he might help him! then he said: "but we will certainly win; we will go to Rome!

The last group of rebels inside Rome, in the rione of Trastevere, was bloodily captured on October 25. The captured Roman rebels were executed in 1868.

Garibaldi with about 8,100 men, had reached the neighbourhood of Rome, occupying Tivoli, Acquapendente and Monterotondo. Here he halted his march, waiting for an insurrection which never occurred. Minor fights ensued, but without relevant results. Three days later he advanced on the Via Nomentana, in order to spur the rebels to action, but returned to Monterotondo the following day.

On the same day, Italian troops of the Royal Italian Army had crossed the boundary to halt the Garibaldine army, and a French force had disembarked in Civitavecchia.

== Battle ==
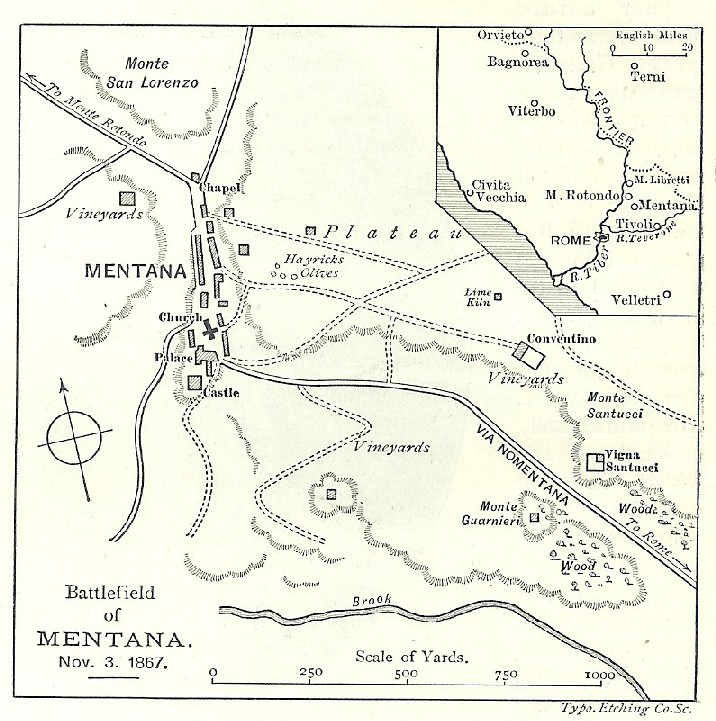
Battlefield of MENTANA. Nov. 3. 1867.

In the first hours of November 3, the Papal troops, under General Hermann Kanzler, and the French expeditionary corps, under General Balthazar de Polhès, moved from Rome to attack Garibaldi's army along the Via Nomentana. The Allies were well trained and organized, and the French troops were armed with the new Chassepot rifle; Garibaldi's volunteers were less well organized, and nearly without any artillery or cavalry, apart from a small squadron led by Garibaldi's son, Ricciotti.

The Papal vanguard met Garibaldi's volunteers about 1.5 kilometres (0.9 mi) south of the village Mentana, midway between Rome and Monterotondo. The three battalions defending the position were quickly dislodged. However, Garibaldi's resistance stiffened in the fortified village, and repeated papal attacks were all pushed back until nightfall. The situation changed when three companies of Zouaves occupied the road from Mentana and Monterotondo. Garibaldi intervened in person, but could not prevent his troops being routed. The survivors entrenched in the castle of Mentana; some surrendered the following morning, and others fled to Monterotondo.

On November 4 Garibaldi retreated to the Kingdom of Italy with 5,100 men. In Mentana, the monument Ara dei Caduti (Altar of the Fallen) is built over the mass grave of the Italian patriots who died in the battle.

Subsequently, a French garrison remained in Civitavecchia until August 1870, when it was recalled following the outbreak of the Franco-Prussian War. Rome was captured by the Italian Army on September 20, 1870, finally giving Italy possession of its capital and concluding the Unification.
