= Jorge Chediak =

Uruguayan lawyer and judge

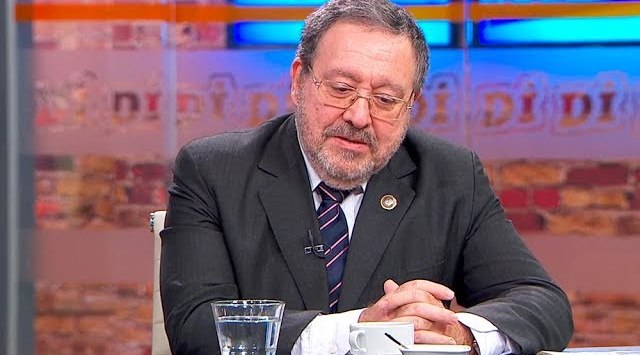
Jorge Chediak

Jorge Chediak (born 7 October 1951, in Montevideo) is a Uruguayan lawyer and judge.

He was a member of the Supreme Court of Justice (2009–2019).
