= Elections in Uruguay =

Elections in Uruguay encompass three different types: general elections, departamental elections and municipal elections. At the national level, Uruguay elects a head of state (the President) and a legislature (the General Assembly). Voting is compulsory and extends to all citizens aged 18 and over.

The Electoral Court sets standards for and issues guidelines to returning officers and polling station officials, and is responsible for nationwide electoral administration (such as the registration of political parties and directing the administration of elections and national referendums).

== 2024 Uruguay general election ==
Party	Presidential candidate	First round		Second round		Seats	
Party	Presidential candidate	Votes	%	Votes	%	Chamber	Senate
Broad Front (Uruguay)	Yamandú Orsi	1,071,826	46.12	1,212,833	52.00	48	16
National Party (Uruguay)	Álvaro Delgado (politician)	655,426	28.20	1,119,537	48.00	29	9
Colorado Party (Uruguay)	Andrés Ojeda	392,592	16.89			17	5
Sovereign Identity	Gustavo Salle	65,796	2.83			2	0
Open Cabildo (Uruguay)	Guido Manini Ríos	60,549	2.61			2	0
Independent Party (Uruguay)	Pablo Mieres	41,618	1.79			1	0
Environmental Constitutional Party	Eduardo Lust	11,865	0.51			0	0
Popular Assembly	Gonzalo Martínez	10,102	0.43			0	0
Partido Ecologista Radical Intransigente	César Vega (agronomist)	9,281	0.40			0	0
For Necessary Changes	Guillermo Franchi	3,183	0.14			0	0
Republican Advance Party	Martín Pérez Banchero	1,909	0.08			0	0
Total		2,324,147	100.00	2,332,370	100.00	99	30

== Voting ==
=== Electoral registration ===
Since voting is compulsory in Uruguay, every Uruguayan citizen upon turning 18 must register in the "National Civic Registry", an electoral roll of citizens with the right to vote, administered by the Electoral Court. After registration, the person obtains the Credencial Cívica, the official document used to cast the vote.

=== Polling procedure ===
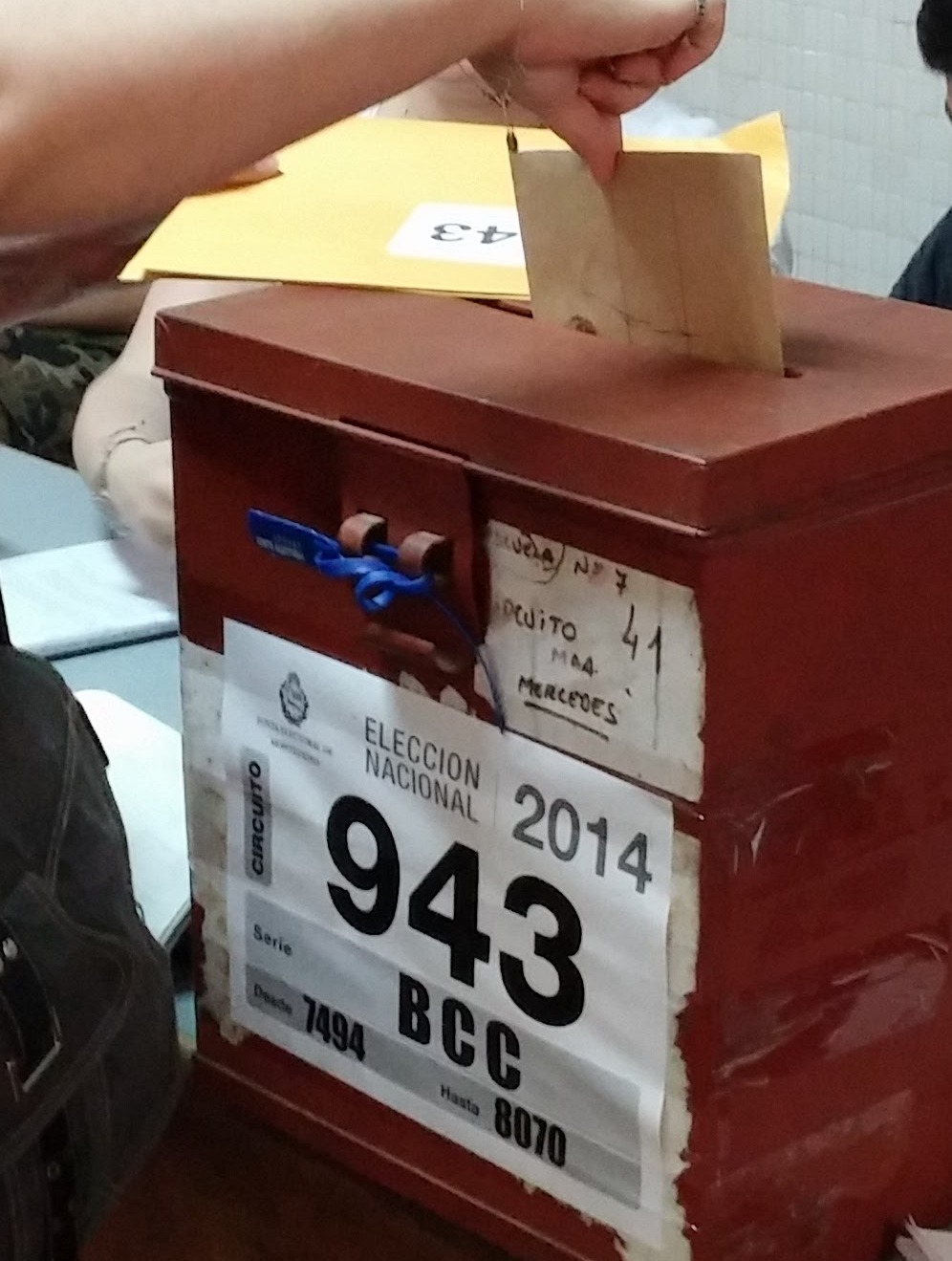
Voting ballot box in the 2014 general elections

The voting procedure is detailed in Law No. 7,812 –known as the "Elections Law"–. To cast the vote, Uruguayan citizens must appear before a polling station determined based on the series and number of their registration in the electoral roll.

Having verified the identity of the voter and their inclusion in the electoral roll, the polling station officials give them an envelope to go to the voting booth, known as Cuarto secreto (Spanish for 'Secret room'), and insert the ballot inside, guaranteeing the secrecy of the vote. Once outside the cuarto secreto, the voter places the envelope inside a closed ballot box.

== Presidential elections ==
The president and the vice-president are elected on one ballot for a five-year term by the people.

In Uruguay, a blanket primary election is held in June to elect the national convention of each party, which selects the presidential candidate. All parties must participate, however voting is voluntary unlike the other instances in the electoral process. The most voted presidential pre-candidate is automatically designated if they reach the absolute majority, or a 40% plurality with a 10% margin over the second most voted candidate. The convention also selects the vice-presidential candidate.

General elections are held in October. If no presidential candidate obtains the absolute majority of votes, there is a runoff between the two most-voted candidates.

== Parliamentary elections ==
The General Assembly (Asamblea General) has two chambers. The Chamber of Deputies (Cámara de Diputados) has 99 members, elected for a five-year term by proportional representation with representation from the 19 departments. The Chamber of Senators (Cámara de Senadores) has 30 members elected for a five-year term by proportional representation at the national level, plus the Vice-president.

After the 2019 elections, seven parties are represented in the Chamber of Deputies and four in the Chamber of Senators.

== Schedule ==
=== Election ===
Position	2029	2030	2031	2032	2033	2034	2035
Type	Presidential (October); National Congress (October); Gubernatorial (October)	None	None			Presidential (October); National Congress (October); Gubernatorial (October)	None
President and vice president	President and vice president	None	None			President and vice president	None
National Congress	All seats	None	None			All seats	None
Provinces, cities and municipalities	None	All positions	None			None	All positions

=== Inauguration ===
Position	2030	2031	2032	2033	2034	2035
Type	Presidential (March); National Congress (March); Gubernatorial (March)	None				Presidential (March); National Congress (March); Gubernatorial (March)
President and vice president	March 1	None				March 1st
National Congress	February 15	None				February 15
Provinces, cities and municipalities	July 8	None				July 11th

== Local elections ==
- 2000 Uruguayan municipal elections
- 2005 Uruguayan municipal elections
- 2010 Uruguayan municipal elections
- 2015 Uruguayan municipal elections
- 2020 Uruguayan municipal elections
- 2022 Uruguayan Law of Urgent Consideration referendum

== Next elections ==
- 2024 Uruguayan general election
- 2025 Uruguayan municipal elections

== See also ==
- Electoral calendar
- Electoral system
- Ley de lemas
