= Andrés Abt =

Uruguayan politician (1973–2021)

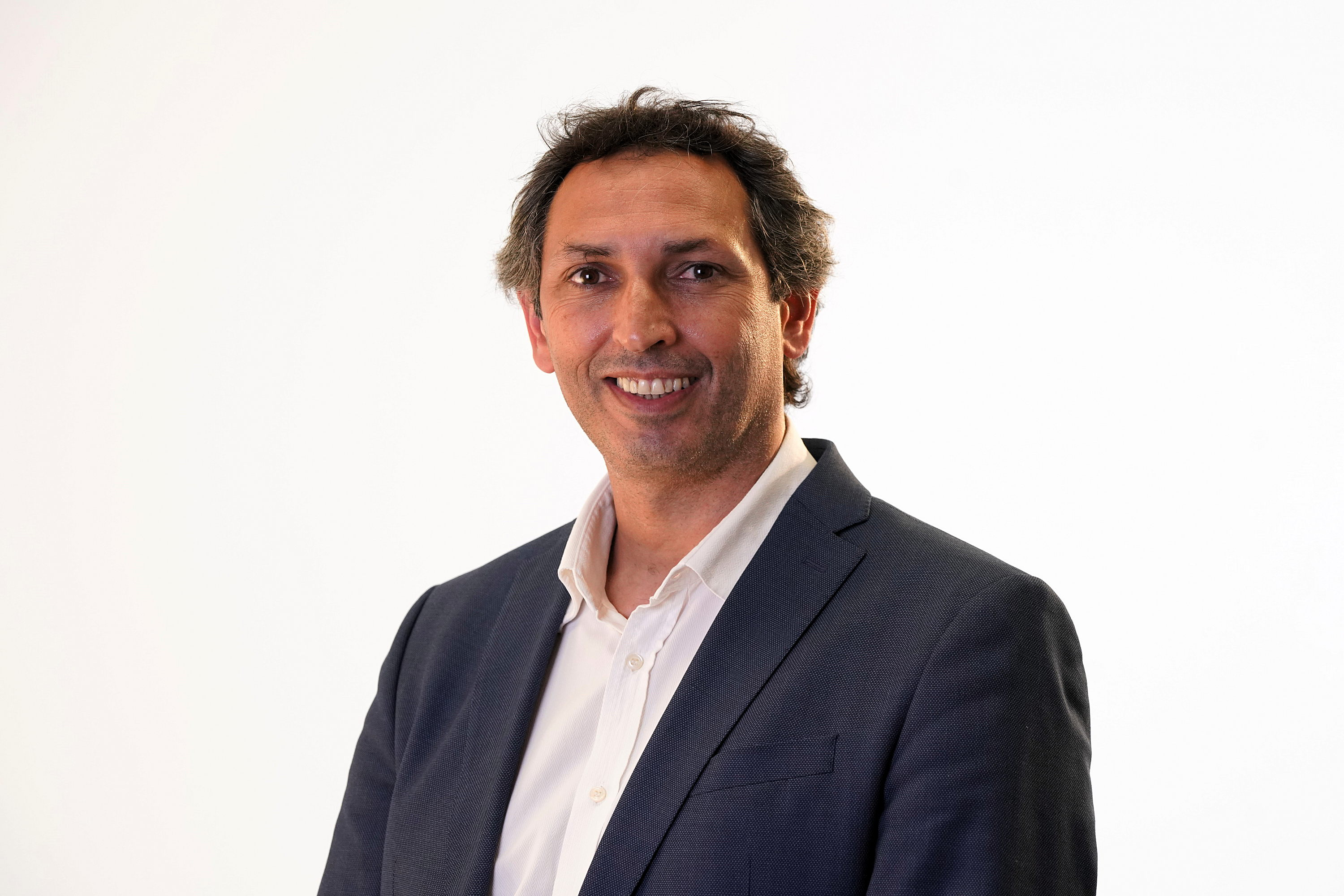
- Born: Andrés Abt Murguiondo; 1973; Montevideo, Uruguay
- Died: 12 March 2021 (47 years old); Montevideo, Uruguay
- Burial place: Israelite Cemetery of La Paz
- Occupation: Politician
- Political party: National Party
- Spouse: Analía Raurich
- Children: Felipe
- Parent(s): Elena Murguiondo; Harry Abt
- Website: Andrés Abt

Andrés Abt (1973 – 12 March 2021) was a Uruguayan politician who served as a member in the Chamber of Representatives and as mayor of Montevideo's CH Municipality.

He died from complications due to COVID-19 on 12 March 2021.

== Biography ==
Born in Montevideo, he was the son of Elena Murguiondo and Harry Abt. He had a sister.

His political life began as a local councilor at CCZ 5 in Punta Carretas. In 2005, he temporarily entered the Chamber of Representatives as a substitute for Jaime Trobo. In the following legislature, he re-entered as a substitute for Ana Lía Piñeyrúa. In the municipal elections of 2015, he was elected mayor of the CH Municipality of Montevideo as part of the political coalition between the National Party and the Colorado Party. During the 2019 general election, he supported the candidacy of Luis Lacalle Pou and was part of a list to the House of Representatives; as the incumbent Gustavo Penadés opted for the Senate, Abt acceded to the seat in the Chamber.

In the municipal elections of 2020, he ran for re-election as mayor while being the campaign manager of Laura Raffo's unsuccessful candidacy to Montevideo's Intendencia. He left the national parliament on 18 November 2020 to run for district CH Mayor again.

== Private life ==
He was married to Analía Raurich and had a son.

In February 2021, he was hospitalized after being diagnosed with COVID-19 and died on 12 March 2021, at the age of 47.

He was buried in the Israelite Cemetery in La Paz, Canelones.
