= Alejo Umpiérrez =

Uruguayan politician (born 1965)

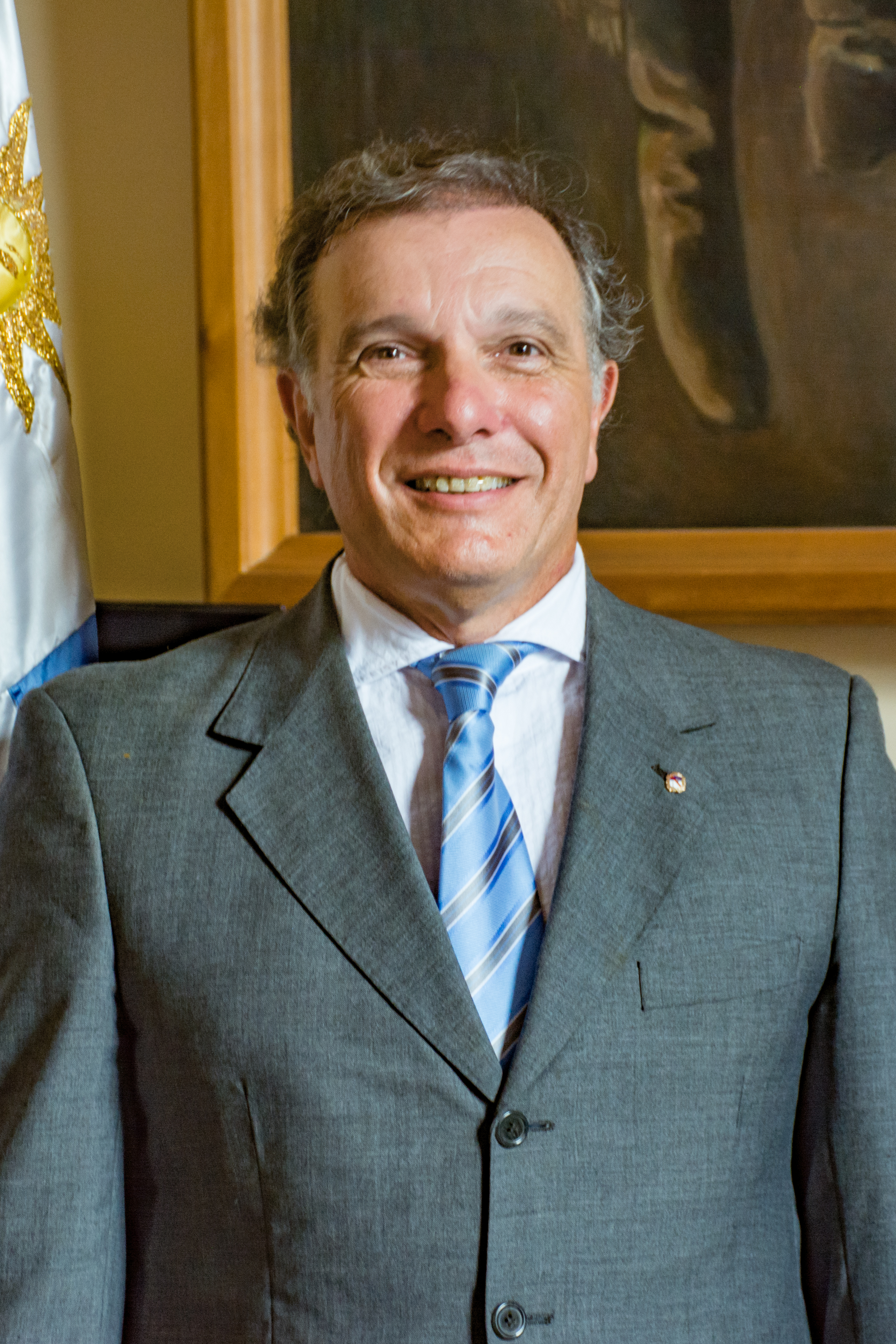
- Umpiérrez in 2022

National Representative
- Incumbent
- Assumed office 15 February 2025
- Constituency: Rocha
- In office 15 February 2015 – 18 November 2020
- Constituency: Rocha

Intendant of the Rocha Department
- In office 27 November 2020 – 26 July 2024
- Preceded by: Aníbal Pereyra
- Succeeded by: Nicolás García

Personal details
- Born: June 3, 1965 (age 60) Lascano, Uruguay
- Party: National
- Spouse: Ana Laura Serralta
- Children: 4

Alejo Alejandro Umpiérrez Cabrera (born June 3, 1965) is a Uruguayan lawyer and politician serving as a National Representative in the 50th Legislature since February 2025. A member of the National Party, he previously served as Intendant of the Rocha Department from 2020 to 2024.

Born in the town of Lascano, Umpiérrez graduated from the University of the Republic with a degree in law and notarization.During his time at university, he wrote several articles for university law journals. After graduating, he worked for different law firms and as a stockgrower in his maternal family's field. In the late 1990s, he was the manager of a soccer team in his hometown and was one of the founders of Rocha F.C., with which he held positions in the Uruguayan Football Association.

== Early life and education ==
Umpiérrez was born in the town of Lascano, Rocha, the son of Abayubá Umpiérrez, a truck driver and bar owner, and Violeta Cabrera, a housewife. On his mother's side, he is the grandson of the Herrerist politician, Antonio Atanasio Cabrera.

As a teenager, he moved with his family to Montevideo. After graduating from high school, he enrolled at the University of the Republic, earning a degree in notarial law in 1991 and a law degree in 1998. During his university years, he became involved in student activism and wrote for academic publications. He was the founder and first director of the Journal of Law of the Center for Law Students (1989–1991).

== Political career ==
In his youth, he was active in centre-left groups, mainly in the Party for the Government of the People (PGP), which was part of the No. 99 electoral list and led by Hugo Batalla, who was a member of the Broad Front. In 1989, he supported the split of the PGP from the Broad Front and the formation of the New Space.

In 1991, he stepped away from active political activism. After returning to the Rocha Department to practice law and work on the family estate, he joined the centre-right National Party at the end of the 1990s, following his time as a columnist for the local newspaper El Este.

From 1999 to 2004 he was part of the party's departmental commission, and in 2000 he was elected member of the Legislature of Rocha, being re-elected in 2005. From 2005 to 2010 he was also the alternate National Representative of the incumbent José Carlos Cardoso. In the 2014 general election, he was elected National Representative for the Rocha Department.

In 2018, while serving as a National Representative, he voted in favor of the Comprehensive Law for Transgender People—commonly known as the Ley Trans. In the 2019 general election, he was reelected as National Representative on the National Party's Lista 404 electoral list. Umpiérrez won the 2020 municipal election with 37.17% of the individual vote, contributing to the 49.41% obtained by the party as a whole.

At the end of 2021, he was appointed coordinator of the National Party's campaign committee for the 'NO' option in the referendum on the Law of Urgent Consideration. In February 2022, a few weeks before the vote, he participated in a debate with Broad Front senator Alejandro Sánchez Pereira. In late July 2024, he resigned from his position as Intendant of Rocha to focus on his campaign for the Chamber of Representatives. In the 2024 general election, he was elected National Representative for the 50th Legislature.
