= Fanny Puyesky =

- Born: Fany Puyesky Mitnik; 23 July 1939; Montevideo, Uruguay
- Died: 15 October 2010 (aged 71); Montevideo, Uruguay
- Resting place: Israelite Cemetery of La Paz
- Education: University of the Republic
- Occupations: Journalist, writer, lawyer
- Notable work: Manual para divorciadas
- Children: 2

Fany Puyesky Mitnik (23 July 1939 – 15 October 2010) was a lawyer, writer, and dramatist known as "the first feminist" of Uruguay.

== Biography ==
Fanny Puyesky received her PhD in Law and Social Sciences from the University of the Republic. From 1981 to 1996 she was a columnist for several weekly newspapers and newspapers in Montevideo, such as Aquí, Brecha, and La República de las Mujeres. In addition to writing about women's rights, she dealt with national and international politics, jurisprudence, and law.

Self-taught in dramaturgy, she excelled in literature and theater. Her work is composed of poetry, humor, novels, literary essays, and texts on law and theater.

In 1979 Puyesky published Manual para divorciadas (Manual for Divorcees), which was a bestseller, and which she then libretted and co-produced with actress and theater director Beatriz Massons. In 1986 she published Mujeres al poder, and in 2006 Diario de una diosa, which was also adapted for the theater.

In 1984 she participated in the National Programmatic Agreement (Concertación Nacional Programática; CONAPRO) Status of Women Working Group, alongside leaders such as Marta Canessa and Ana Lía Piñeyrúa.

In 1992 she wrote La mujer y su dinero. Un cambio hacia la libertad, in which the author raises the difficult relationship between women and money and inquires about the reasons why women are prejudiced about the issue of money and why they should give an account when they spend it.

In 1997 Puyesky produced and premiered the work Berenice's Windows, awarded by the Ministry of Education and Culture.

In 2004, she obtained a master's degree in gender, society, and public policies from the Latin American Social Sciences Institute (Facultad Latinoamericana de Ciencias Sociales; FLACSO), working as an independent regional consultant for equity policies in different organizations throughout the Americas.

In 2009 she obtained a master's degree in society and politics (FLACSO PRIGEPP).

In 2010 she was coordinator of the Gender Diploma of the College of the Americas and the Inter-American University Organization.

Fanny Puyesky died unexpectedly on 15 October 2010 due to a brain aneurysm. Her remains were buried in the Israelite Cemetery of La Paz.

== Manual para divorciadas ==
Published in 1979, Puyesky's Manual para divorciadas (Manual for Divorcees) turned out to be a commercial success. Passages from the manual include:

"Some men are like white dresses: they do not bear up to the second wearing."

"Freedom is something everyone says they love, less in other men and women."

"Nothing has changed as much as men in the last decade: they have become jauleros and querendones. Now, singles want to get married, divorcees want to get married, widowers want to get married, and even married people want to get married again – and everyone wants to change houses for free. Which to go to? To yours, my dear divorcee, of course."

== Works ==
- Manual para divorciadas (1980) Acali Editorial
- La sirenita (1981)
- Dama de noche (1981)
- Viva la burocracia (1983)
- Poemas de amor y bronca (1984) Librosur
- Contracuentos (1985) Librosur
- Mujeres al poder (1986)
- La mujer y su dinero (1992) Editorial Fin de Siglo
- Manual para divorciadas (1994) Editorial Fin de Siglo
- Berenice's Windows (1997) Ministry of Education and Culture co-production prize
- El acoso sexual (1999) Fundación de Cultura Universitaria
- Diario de una diosa (2005) Planeta
