= Vidalín =

Vidalín is a surname. Notable people with the surname include:

- Carmelo Vidalín (born 1955), Uruguayan politician
- Geir Vídalín (1761–1823), Icelandic prelate
