= Gabriel Gurméndez Armand-Ugon =

Uruguayan industrial engineer, business executive and politician

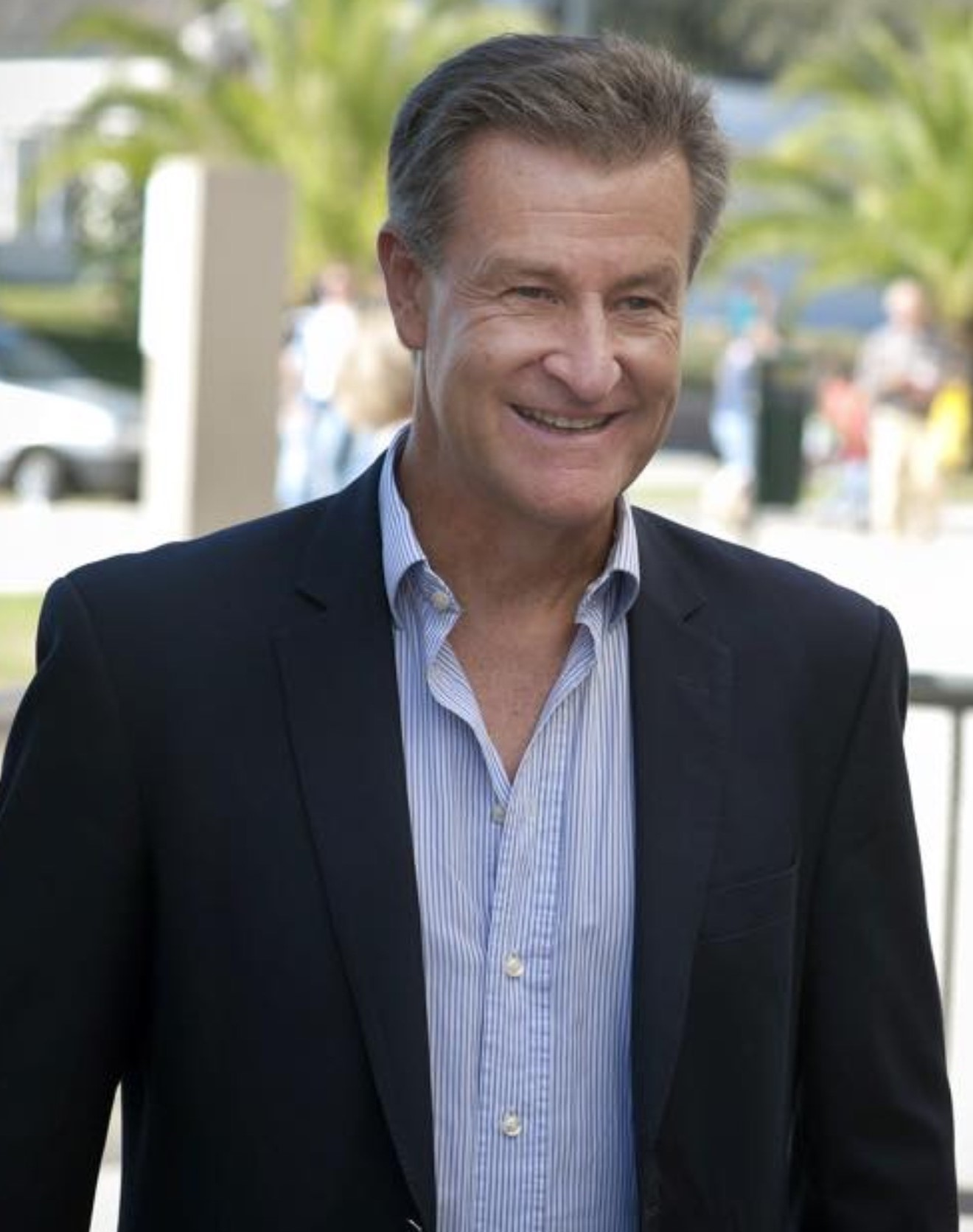
- Gurméndez in 2020

President of the National Administration of Telecommunications
- In office 17 June 2020 – 26 October 2023
- Preceded by: Guillermo Iglesias
- Succeeded by: Annabella Suburú
- In office 25 April 2002 – 2004
- Preceded by: Fernando Bracco
- Succeeded by: Graciela Pérez Montero

Minister of Transport and Public Works
- In office 15 July 2004 – 24 November 2004
- President: Jorge Batlle
- Preceded by: Lucio Cáceres
- Succeeded by: Gabriel Pais

Personal details
- Born: July 4, 1961 (age 64) Montevideo, Uruguay
- Party: Colorado Party
- Occupation: Industrial engineer; business executive; politician

Gabriel Gurméndez Armand-Ugon (born July 4, 1961) is a Uruguayan industrial engineer, business executive and politician of the Colorado Party (PC), who served as president of the National Administration of Telecommunications from 2020 to 2023, and as Minister of Transport and Public Works in 2004.

Gurmendez was born in Montevideo within a family with long ties to the Colorado Party, and graduated from the University of the Republic with a degree in electrical engineering, also obtaining diplomas in economics and business management. Throughout his professional career he has served in the management of numerous companies and business groups, such as the Cancún International Airport.

In the political sphere, he has served as a technical advisor in various government institutions, as well as president of the National Administration of Telecommunications and Minister of Transport and Public Works. Gurmendez was a candidate in the 2024 Colorado presidential primaries for president of Uruguay.

== Early life and education ==
Gabriel Gurméndez Armand-Ugon was born in Montevideo on July 4, 1961, the eldest son of Máximo Gurméndez, a lawyer who served as minister of the Electoral Court and as ambassador to Mexico between 1985 and 1990, and Margarita Armand-Ugon, a mathematics teacher. His paternal grandfather was the diplomat Carlos María Gurméndez who, while serving as ambassador to the Netherlands during World War II, saved 25 Jewish families from the Nazis by granting them Uruguayan passports or appointing them to positions in the embassy.

He was raised in the Pocitos neighborhood of Montevideo and attended The British Schools. He graduated from the University of the Republic with a degree in electrical engineering and earned a diploma in economics from the Montevideo Institute of Economics. He began to be politically active in the Colorado Party in his youth, campaigning for the "NO" option in the 1980 constitutional referendum. In 1981, during the civic-military dictatorship, he was under arrest for three days for distributing political material on the streets, considered by the regime as "subversive pamphlets".

== Career ==
In 1993 he was employed in the financial administrative department of the textile company Sudamtex. However, in 1994 he resigned to assume the position of general manager of Consorcio Aeropuertos Internacionales S.A. He led the construction of the Punta del Este International Airport, which he also managed for eight years. Between 2001 and 2002 he was president of the Tourism and Development League of Punta del Este.

In 2004 he was appointed as executive director of Cancún International Airport in Mexico, managed by Grupo Aeroportuario del Sureste (ASUR). In that position he directed the expansion of Terminal 3, inaugurated by Mexican President Felipe Calderón in 2007, as well as the second runway and control tower project, which was one of the most ambitious investment programs for airport infrastructure in the country.

From 2015 to 2020 Gurméndez served as CEO of HRU S.A, the management company of the Hipodromo Nacional de Maroñas and concessionaire of different racecourses in the country. In 2017 he became part of the board of directors of HRU S.A, as well as the Codere Uruguay Group, a business group of which he also served as country manager.

== Political career ==
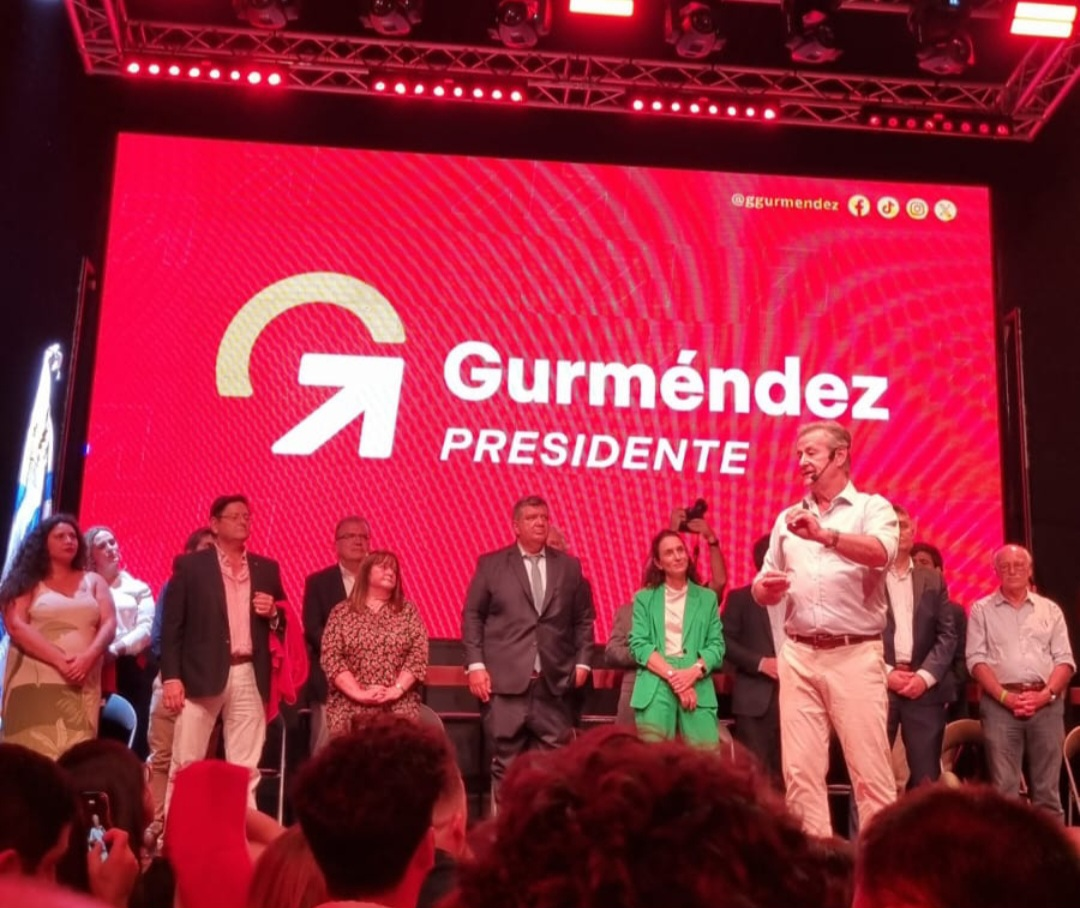
Gurméndez campaign launch

After the democratic transition he served as an advisor in different institutions, such as the Central Bank of Uruguay and the State Railways Administration. From 1990 to 1993 he served as a board member of the National Administration of Telecommunications (ANTEL) as a representative of the Colorado Party. In 2002, then-president Jorge Batlle appointed him president of ANTEL after the resignation of Fernando Bracco. He held the position until July 2004 when he was appointed Minister of Transport and Public Works, to succeed Lucio Cáceres.

In June 2020, he was appointed president of ANTEL, following the resignation of Guillermo Iglesias at the request of President Luis Lacalle Pou. He resigned on October 26, 2023, to run for president of Uruguay in the 2024 Colorado Party primary. In the election, he came in third place with 18.6% of the votes for the party. In August, he confirmed that he would form an alliance with Pedro Bordaberry's Vamos Uruguay sector. In the general election, Lista 10 was the most voted electoral list of the Colorado Party, and Gurméndez was elected to the Chamber of Representatives for the 50th Legislature.
