= Rydstrom =

Rydstrom, also spelt Rydström and Rydstrøm, is a surname. Notable people with the surname include:

- Arthur Rydstrøm (1896–1986), Norwegian gymnast
- Carlos Rydström (born 1992), Uruguayan politician
- Gary Rydstrom (born 1959), American sound designer and director
- Henrik Rydström (born 1976), Swedish football manager and former player
- Nils Rydström (1921-2018), Swedish fencer
- Rudolf Rydström (1886–1929), Swedish wrestler
