= Enrique Antía =

Uruguayan politician and engineer

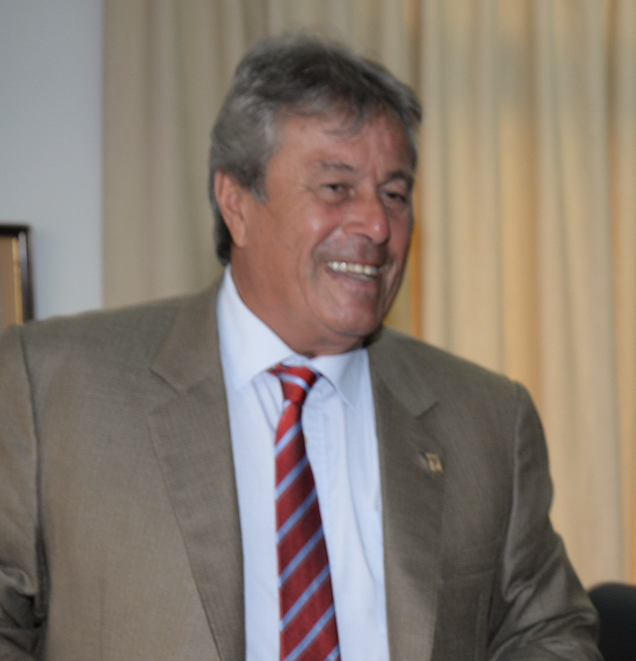

Intendant of Maldonado
- In office 26 November 2020 – 10 July 2025
- Preceded by: Jesús Bentancor
- Succeeded by: Miguel Abella
- In office 9 July 2015 – 6 February 2020
- Preceded by: Óscar de los Santos
- Succeeded by: Jesús Bentancor
- In office 13 July 2000 – 7 February 2005
- Preceded by: Camilo Tortorella
- Succeeded by: Oscar de los Santos

Representative of Uruguay for Maldonado
- In office 2014–2015

Senator of Uruguay
- In office 15 February 2005 – 14 February 2010

Personal details
- Born: Enrique Andrés Antía Behrens; 30 November 1949 (age 76) Maldonado, Uruguay
- Party: National Party
- Spouse: Liliana Bernárdez
- Education: University of the Republic
- Occupation: Agricultural engineer; politician

Enrique Andrés Antía Behrens (born November 30, 1949) is a Uruguayan agricultural engineer and politician of the National Party (PN). He has served three terms as Intendant of the Maldonado Department.

Graduated from the University of the Republic, he has an agricultural engineering degree. He served as an Extension Technician for the National Milk Producers Cooperative (Conaprole) in the departments of Maldonado and Rocha for twenty years.

== Family ==
Born in Maldonado as the son of the architect Enrique Antía Arlo and Consuelo Behrens Muñoz, Antía is the first cousin of the former Minister of Transport and Public Works, Lucio Cáceres Behrens, on his maternal side, and his mother is the first cousin of the well-known actress China Zorrilla.

== Political career ==
He began his militancy as a member of the Nationalist University Movement (MUN). In 1985, when democracy returned, he was elected edil of the Maldonado Departmental Board.

In the 2000 municipal elections, he was elected Intendant of Maldonado, a position he held until 2005. While in the 2004 general election, he was elected Senator of the Republic for the 46th Legislature, as part of the Wilsonist Current faction. From that year to 2014 he was part of the Board of the National Party.

In the 2005 municipal elections, Antía was again a candidate for Intendant, being defeated by the Broad Front nominee Óscar de los Santos. In 2010 he ran for the Intendancy of Maldonado, being defeated by De los Santos, who was re-elected. In July of that year he was appointed to the board of directors of the National Administration of Power Plants and Transmissions (UTE).

In 2015 he ran again for the post of Intendant of Maldonado, being elected for five years and ending the 10-year leftist rule in the department. In 2019 he was pre-candidate for president for the National Party in the presidential primaries; he obtained 7.51% of the votes, being defeated by Luis Lacalle Pou, who was the candidate in the general election.

On February 6, 2020, he resigned as Intendant to dedicate himself to the re-election campaign. In the municipal elections of September, he was re-elected Intendant of Maldonado, with 37.4% of the votes. He took office for the third time on November 26.
