= 50th Legislature of the Chamber of Representatives of Uruguay =

50th Legislature of the Chamber of Representatives
←	49th

Overview
- Legislative body: General Assembly
- Jurisdiction: Uruguay
- Meeting place: Montevideo
- Term: 15 February 2025 – 15 February 2030
- Election: 27 October 2024
- Website: parlamento.gub.uy

Chamber of Representatives
- Members: 99 deputies

Sessions
- 1st: 15 February 2025 – 15 December 2025
- 2nd: 1 March 2026 –

The Fifty Legislature of the Chamber of Representatives of Uruguay is the current meeting of the lower house of the Uruguayan General Assembly. It convened in Montevideo on February 15, 2025, during the last weeks of Luis Lacalle Pou's presidency and will remain in session throughout the five-year term of Yamandú Orsi's presidency.

Composition of the Chamber

Deputies were elected in the 2024 general election by department, for a five-year term by proportional representation with at least two members per department. The opposition Republican Coalition have a simple majority of 49 seats, compared to 48 for the ruling Broad Front and 2 for Sovereign Identity, which is not part of either of the two blocs.

== Party summary ==
Party	Senate			
Party	Votes	%	Seats	+/–
Broad Front	1,071,826	43.86	16	+3
National Party	655,426	26.82	9	–1
Colorado Party	392,592	16.07	5	+1
Sovereign Identity	65,796	2.69	0	New
Open Cabildo	60,549	2.48	0	–3
Partido Ecologista Radical Intransigente	33,461	1.43	0	0
Constitutional Environmentalist Party	11 865	0.49	0	New
Independent Party	41,618	1.70	0	0
Popular Unity-Workers' Party	10 102	0.41	0	0
For Necessary Changes Party	3,183	0.14	0	New
Republican Advance Party	1,909	0.08	0	New
Invalid/blank votes	85,106	–	–	–
Total	2,443,901	100.00	30	0
Source: Corte Electoral

== Composition ==
=== Artigas === ▌ Emiliano Soravilla (PN) ▌ Nicolás Lorenzo (FA) === Canelones === ▌ Sebastián Andújar (PN) ▌ Walter Cervini (PC) ▌ Inés Cortés (FA) ▌ Álvaro Dastugue (PN) ▌ Juan Pablo Delgado ▌ Daniel Diverio (FA) ▌ Matías Duque (PC) ▌ Paula de Armas (PC) ▌ Pedro Irigoin (FA) ▌ Margarita Libschitz (FA) ▌ José Carlos Mahía (FA) ▌ William Martínez (FA) ▌ Amín Niffouri (PN) ▌ Álvaro Perrone (CA) ▌ Federico Preve (FA) ▌ Carlos Reyes (FA) ▌ Nicolle Salle (IS) ▌ Nataly Zalkino (FA) === Cerro Largo === ▌ Graciela Echenique (PN) ▌ Yisela Araujo (FA) === Colonia === ▌ Mario Colman (PN) ▌ Nibia Reisch (PC) ▌ Nicolás Viera (FA) === Durazno === ▌ Aidemar González (FA) ▌ Domingo Rielli (PN) === Flores === ▌ Andrés Grezzi (PN) ▌ Ana Laura Melo (FA) === Florida === ▌ Álvaro Rodríguez Hunter (PN) ▌ Carlos Rodríguez (FA) === Lavalleja === ▌ Adriana Peña (PN) ▌ Javier Umpiérrez (PN) === Maldonado === ▌ Eduardo Antonini (FA) ▌ Mary Araujo (FA) ▌ Rodrigo Blas (PN) ▌Diego Echeverría ▌ Gabriel Gurméndez Armand-Ugon === Montevideo === ▌ Pablo Abdala (PN) ▌ Víctor Aldaya (FA) ▌ Fernando Amado (FA) ▌ Tatiana Antúnez (FA) ▌ Fernanda Auersperg (PN) ▌ Graciela Barrera (FA) ▌ Melody Caballero (FA) ▌ Elianne Castro (PC) ▌ Bettiana Díaz (FA) ▌ Bruno Giometti (FA) ▌ Gabriel Gianoli (PN) ▌ Rodrigo Goñi (PN) ▌ Pablo Inthamoussu (FA) ▌ Pedro Jisdonian (PN) ▌ Juan Martín Jorge (PC) ▌ Sol Maneiro (FA) ▌ Sandra Nedov (FA) ▌ Diana Noy ▌ María Inés Obaldía (FA) ▌ Juan José Olaizola (PN) ▌ Ana Olivera (FA) ▌ Rosario Palleiro (PC) ▌ Estela Pereyra (FA) ▌ Silvana Pérez Bonavita (CA) ▌ Marcos Presa (FA) ▌ Juan Martín Rodríguez (PN) ▌ Conrado Rodríguez (PC) ▌ Felipe Schipani (PC) ▌ Gustavo Salle (IS) ▌ José Luis Sadjian (PN) ▌ Julieta Sierra (FA) ▌ Gerardo Sotelo (PI) ▌ Mariano Tucci (FA) ▌ Carlos Varela (FA) ▌Sebastián Valdomir (FA) ▌Carlos Rydström (PC) ▌ Alejandro Zavala (FA)	=== Paysandú === ▌ Fermín Farinha (PN) ▌ Juan Gorosterrazu (FA) ▌ Walter Verri (FA) === Río Negro === ▌ Silvia Ibarguren (FA) ▌ Mercedes Long (PN) === Rivera === ▌ Marti Molins (PC) ▌ Marne Osorio (PC) ▌ Andrés Toriani (FA) === Rocha === ▌ Aníbal Pereyra (FA) ▌ Alejo Umpiérrez (PN) === Salto === ▌ Carlos Albisu (PN) ▌ Horacio de Brum (PC) ▌ Álvaro Lima (FA) === San José === ▌ Nicolás Mesa (FA) ▌ Sergio Valverde (PN) ▌ Mauricio Viera (PC) === Soriano === ▌ María Barreiro (PN) ▌ Aníbal Méndez === Tacuarembó === ▌ Máximo Campo (PC) ▌ Alfredo de Mattos (PN) ▌ Zumilar Ferreira (FA) === Treinta y Tres === ▌ Nino Medina (FA) ▌ Mónica Pereira (PN)
