= Carlos Rydström =

Uruguayan politician (born 1992)

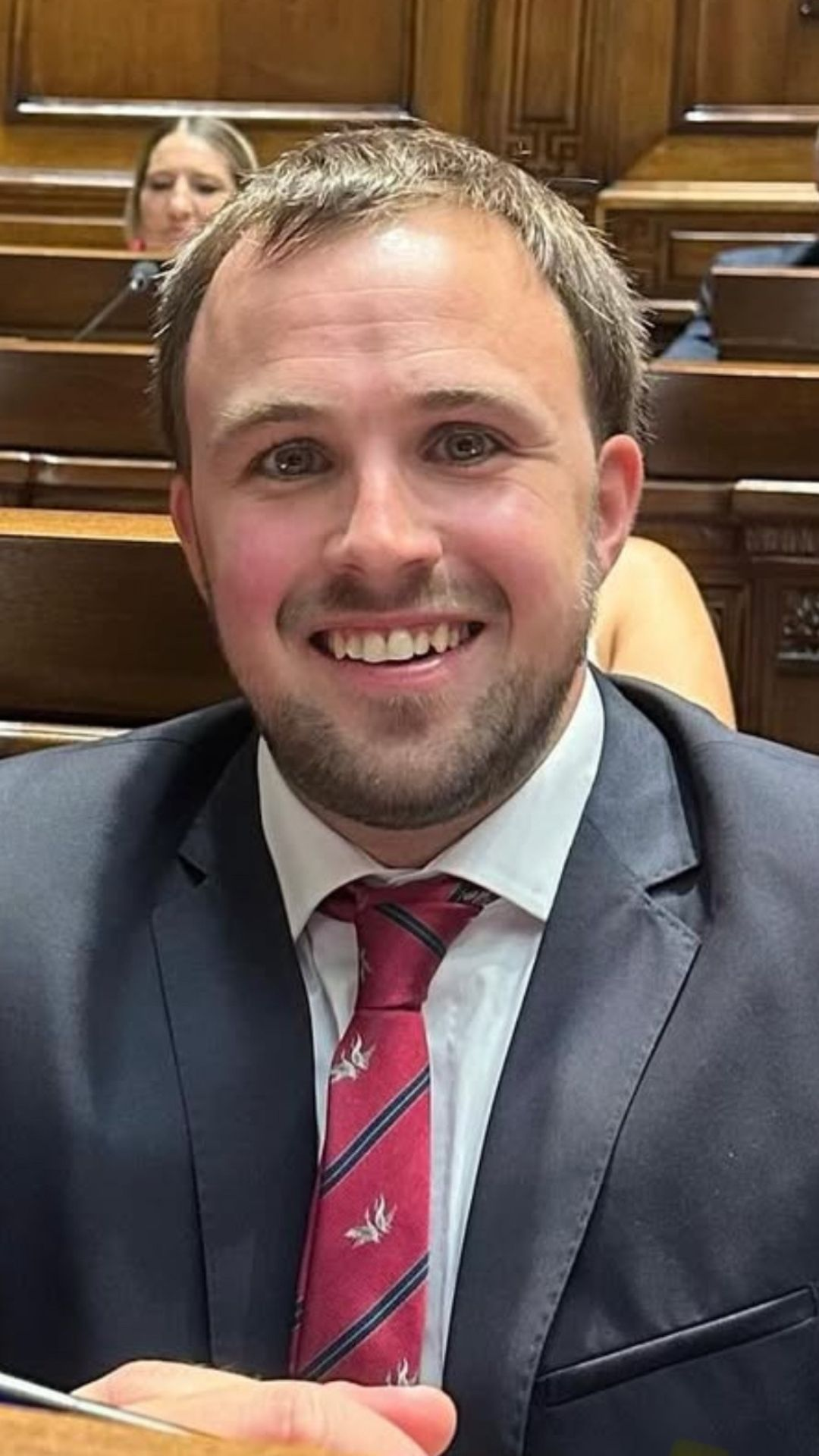
- Rydström in 2025

National Representative
- Incumbent
- Assumed office 15 February 2025
- Constituency: Montevideo

Personal details
- Born: April 22, 1992 (age 33) Montevideo, Uruguay
- Political party: Colorado
- Education: University of the Republic
- Occupation: Agricultural engineer; politician

Carlos Augusto Rydström Henderson (born April 22, 1992) is a Uruguayan agricultural engineer and politician, serving as a National Representative in the 50th Legislature. A member of the Colorado Party, he served as Director General of Rural Development at the Ministry of Livestock, Agriculture, and Fisheries from 2020 to 2023.

== Early life and education ==
Rydström was born and raised in Montevideo in a family of agricultural engineers. He graduated from the University of the Republic with a degree in agricultural engineering and earned a diploma in agriculture from Lincoln University in New Zealand in 2012.

== Career ==
He joined the Colorado Party in early 2010 at the age of 17. From December 2014 to June 2025, he was a member of the Departmental Executive Committee, the party's highest governing body in the Montevideo Department, where he eventually served as its secretary-general.

In the 2019 general election, he endorsed Ernesto Talvi for president and ran unsuccessfully for the Chamber of Representatives. During the presidency of Luis Lacalle Pou, he held several positions in the Ministry of Livestock, Agriculture, and Fisheries, serving as Director of the Unit for Decentralization and Departmental Coordination from March to August 2020, and as Director of the General Directorate of Rural Development from September 2020 to November 2023.

In October 2023, Lista 30, the electoral list led by Rydström, withdrew from the Ciudadanos faction to support Gabriel Gurméndez Armand-Ugón’s presidential pre-candidacy ahead of the 2024 Colorado Party primaries. In that year's general election, he ran again for the Chamber of Representatives as the second candidate on the Lista 10 electoral list of Vamos Uruguay, the faction led by Pedro Bordaberry in the Senate race, and was elected to the 50th Legislature.
