= Cecilia Eguiluz =

Uruguayan lawyer and politician

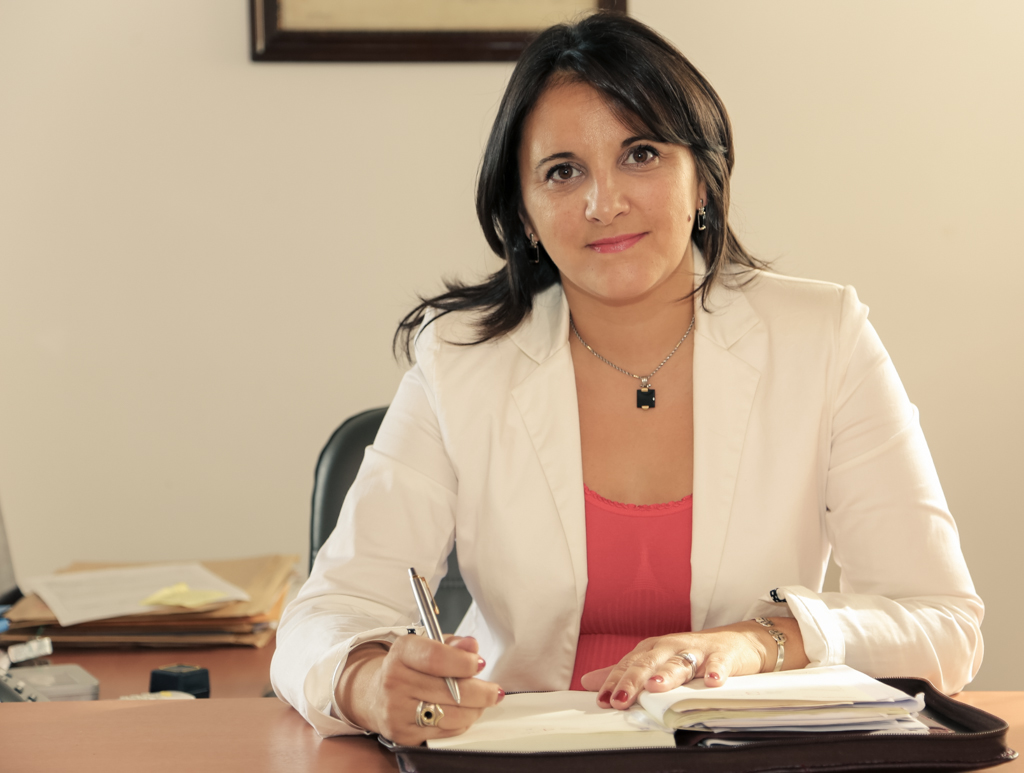

Member of the Chamber of Representatives of Uruguay
- In office 25 October 2009 – March 2020
- Constituency: Salto

Personal details
- Born: August 29, 1974 (age 52) Salto, Uruguay
- Party: Colorado Party; Open Cabildo
- Spouse: Gustavo Boksar
- Education: University of Alcalá de Henares; University of the Republic (Uruguay)

María Cecilia Eguiluz Laxague (born 29 August 1974 in Salto, Uruguay) is a Uruguayan lawyer and politician. She has served as a Member of the Chamber of Representatives of Uruguay, Secretary General of the Salto Municipality and as National Deputy of the Colorado Party. She is currently the leader of Cabildo Abierto (CA) in Salto.

== Biography ==
Eguiluz was born on 29 August 1974 in Salto, Uruguay and became interested in politics as a teenager. Her parents are María Juana Laxague and Jesús Humberto Eguiluz.

In May 2002, Eguiluz received a Master's degree in Human Rights, the Rule of Law, and Democracy in Latin America from the University of Alcalá de Henares, Spain. She studied a PhD in Law at the University of the Republic (Uruguay).

As a politician of the centre-right Colorado Party (Uruguay), Eguiluz was Director of Youth and Sports for the Salto Municipality from 2004 to 2005. Eguiluz was a member of the Vamos Uruguay faction furthest to the right within the Colorado Party. During this period, Eguiluz was Pedro Bordaberry's first alternate in the Senate when he took charge of the Uruguayan Football Association and had to request a leave of absence from Parliament.

Eguiliuz was elected as Member of the Chamber of Representatives of Uruguay for Salto in the 2009 Uruguayan general election. From July 2010 to February 2015, Eguiluz served as Secretary General of the Salto Municipality.

In March 2013, Eguiluz participated in the International Visitor Leadership Program (ILVP) exchange programme "Women in Action: Promoting Women's Issues in the Political System," representing her country on a tour in the United States.

Eguiluz became National Deputy of the Colorado Party in 2015. Whilst serving as a Member of the Chamber of Representatives of Uruguay, and after the findings of the UNICEF report "Panorama of Violence Against Children in Uruguay 2017," Eguiluz proposed unifying bills which had been drafted to prevent the abuse and murder of children.

Eguiluz declared herself an independent politician in 2017, resigning from her executive positions in the Colorado Party structure. She remained in her elected position until the end of her parliamentary term in March 2020.

In August 2021, Eguiluz joined the right-wing populist political party Cabildo Abierto, which was founded in 2019. Eguiluz founded the Éxodo del Siglo XXI group within the party in November 2021. In 2023, she defended Cabildo Abierto's campaign to reform the Uruguayan Constitution.

In 2024, Eguiluz ran as a candidate, and became leader of Cabildo Abierto in the Salto Municipality. In 2025, she endorsed nationalist Carlos Albisu's campaign for election as mayor of Salto and coordinated his election campaign.
