= 2000 Uruguayan municipal elections =

Final results by department of the Uruguayan municipal elections, 2000. Broad Front Colorado Party National Party

The municipal elections held on May 14, 2000, resulted in the consolidation of the EP-FA as the most popular party, a strong recovery for the Partido Nacional after its worst ever performance in the 1999 general elections, and a slight drop of support for the incumbent Partido Colorado of President Jorge Batlle.

== Overview ==
These elections were held 2 1/2 months after Jorge Batlle had been inaugurated president. Batlle, of the Partido Colorado, had been the winner of a presidential run-off on November 28, 1999, over Tabaré Vázquez, of the Frente Amplio. The 1999 elections had seen a major transformation of the Uruguayan political landscape, as the Frente Amplio had emerged as the largest party, breaking with the traditional PC-PN bipartisan competition, and the Partido Nacional had suffered its worst defeat in its history.

At the time of the municipal elections, the Batlle administration was in its early stages and was enjoying a honeymoon with the electorate. The Partido Colorado and the Partido Nacional had formed a coalition government, made up of 8 Colorado ministers and 5 Blanco ministers, and with an absolute majority in parliament. In this context, the two traditional parties faced off at the polls the emergent Frente Amplio, successfully defending all 18 departments ruled by them, the Frente Amplio unable to win any department aside of Montevideo.

In the previous municipal elections, held simultaneously with the presidential and legislative elections of November 1994, the Partido Nacional had won 11 departments, the Partido Colorado 7 departments, and the Frente Amplio 1 department. As a result of the municipal elections of 2000, the Partido Nacional won 13 departments, the Partido Colorado 5, and the Frente Amplio 1 department. The Partido Nacional had a net gain of 2 departments, the Partido Colorado had a net loss of 2 departments, while the Frente Amplio remained unchanged.

== Results ==
Party	Votes	%
Broad Front–Progressive Encounter	807,843	39.14
Colorado Party	650,216	31.50
National Party	577,871	28.00
New Space	21,772	1.05
Civic Union	6,416	0.31
Total	2,064,118	100.00
Source: Corte Electoral (www.corteelectoral.gub.uy)

Following is a list of the departments in Uruguay, with the name of the intendente elected, his party affiliation and the fraction within the party to which he belongs:

Montevideo: Mariano Arana (Frente Amplio, Vertiente Artiguista). Re-elected incumbent. Hold for the Frente Amplio.

Artigas: Carlos Signorelli (Partido Colorado, Foro Batllista).

Canelones: Tabaré Hackenbruch (Partido Colorado, Foro Batllista). Re-elected incumbent. Hold for the Partido Colorado.

Cerro Largo: Ambrosio Barreiro (Partido Nacional, Herrerismo). Hold for the Partido Nacional.

Colonia: Carlos Moreira (Partido Nacional, Herrerismo). Re-elected incumbent. Hold for the Partido Nacional.

Durazno: Carmelo Vidalín (Partido Nacional, Herrerismo). Hold for the Partido Nacional.

Flores: Carlos Mazzullo (Partido Nacional, Alianza Nacional). Re-elected incumbent. Hold for the Partido Nacional.

Florida: Andrés Arocena (Partido Nacional, Línea Nacional de Florida). Pickup for the Partido Nacional from the Partido Colorado.

Lavalleja: Hermán Vergara (Partido Nacional, Herrerismo). Hold for the Partido Nacional.

Maldonado: Enrique Antía (Partido Nacional, Independent). Hold for the Partido Nacional.

Paysandú: Alvaro Lamas (Partido Nacional, Alianza Nacional). Hold for the Partido Nacional.

Río Negro: Mario Carminatti (Partido Colorado, Lista 15). Hold for the Partido Colorado.

Rivera: Tabaré Viera (Partido Colorado), Foro Batllista). Hold for the Partido Colorado.

Rocha: Irineu Riet Correa (Partido Nacional, Alianza Nacional). Pickup for the Partido Nacional from the Partido Colorado.

Salto: Eduardo Malaquina (Partido Colorado, Foro Batllista). Re-elected incumbent. Hold for the Partido Colorado.

San José: Juan Antonio Chiruchi (Partido Nacional, Herrerismo). Hold for the Partido Nacional.

Soriano: Gustavo Lapaz (Partido Nacional, Independent). Re-elected incumbent. Hold for the Partido Nacional.

Tacuarembó: Eber da Rosa (Partido Nacional, Alianza Nacional). Re-elected incumbent. Hold for the Partido Nacional.

Treinta y Tres: Wilson Elso Goñi (Partido Nacional, Movimiento Nacional de Rocha). Hold for the Partido Nacional.

In the following map of Uruguay, departments coloured in blue represent the departments where the Partido Nacional won, the departments coloured in red represent the departments where the Partico Colorado won, and the departments coloured in dark red represent the departments where the Frente Amplio won.
