= Wilsonist Current =

- Leader: Francisco Gallinal
- Ideology: Social liberalism
- Political position: Centre
- National affiliation: National Party

The Wilsonist Current (Spanish: Correntada Wilsonista) is a social-liberal faction of the National Party of Uruguay.

Founded in 2002 by Francisco Gallinal, its name comes from the Wilsonism, an important tendency of the Party, led by Wilson Ferreira Aldunate. In 2008, jointly with the Herrerism, the Wilsonist Current created the National Unity, a group that supported the candidature of the former president Luis Alberto Lacalle for the primary elections of June 2009. Lacalle was beaten in the second round of the presidential election of November 2009 by José Mujica, candidate of the Broad Front (left coalition).

== History ==
The Wilsonist Current was founded in 2002 by Francisco Gallinal, elected senator in 1999 as part of the Herrerism faction. In the primary elections of 2004, this tendency supported the candidature of Jorge Larrañaga, that obtained the nomination of the party.

Several leaders of the Party are part of this faction, such as Enrique Antía (former mayor of the Maldonado Department) and Herman Vergara (former mayor of the Lavalleja Department). The ex-representative Beatriz Argimón was also part of the Wilsonist Current, but left it in December of 2007.
