= Gerardo Sotelo =

Uruguayan politician (born 1958)

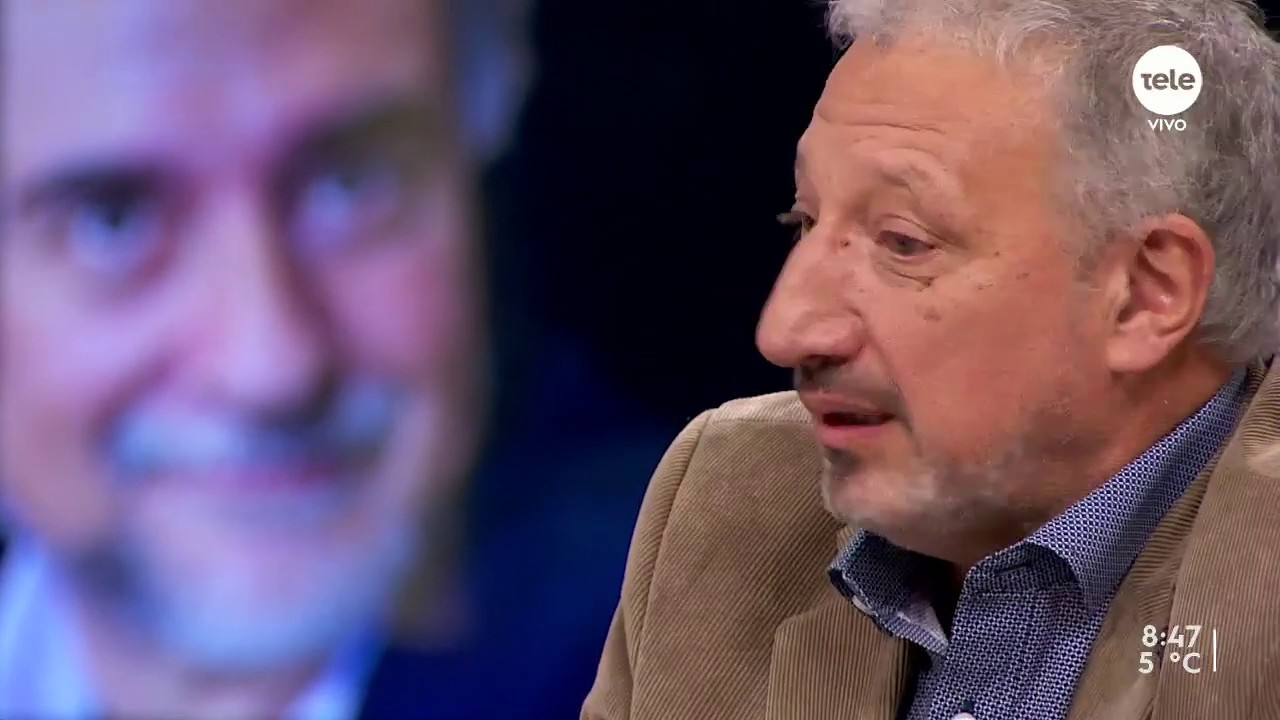
- Sotelo in 2019

National Representative
- Incumbent
- Assumed office February 15, 2025
- Constituency: Montevideo

President of the National Audiovisual Communication Service
- In office April 25, 2020 – June 1, 2024
- Preceded by: Ernesto Kreimerman
- Succeeded by: Carlos Muñoz

Director of National Television
- In office April 22, 2020 – June 1, 2024
- Preceded by: Carlos Muñoz
- Succeeded by: Carlos Muñoz

Personal details
- Born: April 28, 1958 (age 67) Montevideo, Uruguay
- Party: Independent Party
- Children: 6
- Occupation: Journalist; autor; politician

Gerardo Sotelo del Giacco (born April 28, 1958) is a Uruguayan journalist, author and politician, serving as a National Representative in the 50th Legislature since 2025. A member of the Independent Party, he previously served as director of the National Television and president of the National Audiovisual Communication Service from 2020 to 2024.

== Early life and education ==
Sotelo was born in Montevideo in 1958 and was raised in the Palermo neighborhood. His father was a graphic worker, and his mother was an officer at the State Insurance Bank. He is of Galician and Italian descent. He attended public schools and completed a technical baccalaureate at the Higher School of Social Communication and Graphic Design of the University of Labor of Uruguay.

== Journalistic career ==
Sotelo began his journalistic career in 1981, publishing articles in Noticias magazine and later in the weekly publications Opción and Aquí, opposition periodicals during Uruguay’s transition to democracy. In 1994, he entered television as a co-host of Channel 4's morning program Muy Buenos Días, alongside Ana Nahum. In 1997, he premiered Caleidoscopio on Channel 10 together with María Inés Obaldía; the show remained on the air for five years.

== Political career ==
In 2019, Sotelo announced his affiliation with the Independent Party and entered political activity. In the general election held that year, he was the party’s second substitute candidate for the Senate. In early 2020, he was proposed by the Independent Party as a candidate for Intendant of Montevideo under the Multicolor Coalition; however, he later withdrew his candidacy due to a lack of support from the other coalition parties. He was later selected as a substitute candidate for Laura Raffo, the coalition’s candidate representing the Independent Party, a role from which he subsequently resigned.

On 22 April 2020, Sotelo was appointed director of National Television, and three days later director of the National Audiovisual Communication Service. He resigned from both positions in June 2024 in order to participate in the electoral campaign as a candidate for the Chamber of Representatives. In the general election, he was elected, becoming the only legislator from the Independent Party in the 50th Legislature.
