= 2022 Uruguayan Law of Urgent Consideration referendum =

Referendum on the repeal of a 2020 law

Referendum on the Urgent Consideration Law
- 27 March 2022
- Referendum appeal against 135 articles of Law No. 19,889 of 9 July 2020
- Outcome: Repeal rejected

Results
Choice	Votes	%
Yes	1,078,425	48.67%
No	1,108,360	50.02%
Blank votes	29,121	1.31%
Valid votes	2,215,906	96.39%
Invalid votes	83,031	3.61%
Total votes	2,298,937	100.00%
Registered voters/turnout	2,684,131	85.65%
- Results by department: Yes No

A referendum on the Urgent Consideration Law was held in Uruguay to ask the electorate if 135 articles of Law 19,889 (known as the "Urgent Consideration Law", "Urgency Law" or simply "LUC") – approved by the General Assembly in 2020 and considered as the main legislative initiative of the coalition government of President Luis Lacalle Pou — should be repealed. It was the result of a campaign promoted by various social and political actors such as the national trade union center PIT-CNT and the opposition party Broad Front. On 8 July 2021, almost 800,000 adhesions were delivered to the Electoral Court, exceeding 25% of the total number of registered voters who are constitutionally required to file a referendum appeal against a law.

Article 168 of the Uruguayan Constitution establishes that the Executive Branch may submit bills to the General Assembly declaring them "of urgent consideration". In this case, the House that receives the bill in the first instance has a period of 45 days to put it into consideration; if the term expires without the bill being rejected, it is considered approved in its original form and is communicated to the other House, which has a term of 30 days, and in case of approving a bill with modifications, it must re-enter the first House where it will have another 15 days for consideration. If after this period there is no express statement that demonstrates common agreement between the houses regarding the modifications, the bill is sent to the General Assembly, which will have 10 days to consider it. With this constitutional mechanism, if a bill does not receive parliamentary approval within the stipulated periods, it automatically becomes law in the form in which it was sent by the Executive Power.

Since the transition to democracy in 1985, only 13 bills were sent to Parliament with a declaration of "urgent consideration" (0.003% of the total bills sent by the Executive in that period), of which 9 were approved and 4 were rejected. All governments applied the mechanism, except for the second terms of Julio María Sanguinetti and Tabaré Vázquez. However, in most of these cases urgent consideration was used for specific topics and only 3 bill fall into the category of “Omnibus bill”, based on the number of topics covered.

For the repeal to happen, the total of yes votes had to reach the absolute majority of valid votes, which included blank ones. It thus failed, only 48.67 % of the total votes including blank ones being for the repeal.

== Background ==
In 2018, the then presidential pre-candidate Luis Lacalle Pou of the National Party (PN) declared that his first measure in case of assuming the presidency in 2020 would be to send a bill to the Legislative Branch with the label of "urgent consideration", which would be the result of the negotiation between the members of a possible coalition government and whose content would include "everything that needs to be modified in the State", covering "education, security, housing, economy, administrative issues". The aim of the initiative would be "to take advantage of the first year of government to quickly apply the changes considered necessary". Pablo Da Silveira, then Lacalle campaign programmatic coordinator and Minister of Education and Culture in the subsequent government, referred to the fact that with this "omnibus law" actions could be taken in a shortened period with respect to a budget law, which requires a process more extensive legislature.

In March 2019, Lacalle Pou officially launched his campaign for the presidential primaries, which were held on 30 June of the same year. He obtained 53.77 percent of the vote, defeating Juan Sartori, Jorge Larrañaga, Enrique Antía and Carlos Iafigliola. Shortly after the victory, the nationalist candidate's campaign team began to draft the Law of Urgent Consideration (LUC), with Rodrigo Ferrés as the person in charge. It was stated then that the bill would have between 300 and 500 articles and that its content would be based on the government program of the PN. It was criticized from the Broad Front (FA), the Socialist Party (PS) affirmed that the mechanism would be unconstitutional since its use requires an identified pre-existing urgency and not one created "for political or ideological reasons or government priorities".

Originally, the Lacalle Pou campaign team planned to finish the drafting of the LUC bill in October 2019, so that it would be presented prior to the first round of the general election, to be held on the 27th of that month. However, this did not happen. In the election, the FA and the PN were the two most voted parties, with 39 and 28.6 percent of the vote, respectively. This result led to a second round between the candidates of each one to be held in November 2019, towards which all the main opposition parties lined up behind Lacalle Pou, forming the Coalición Multicolor. This alliance presented a common programmatic agreement known as "Commitment for the Country". In the second round, Lacalle Pou was elected the 42nd president of Uruguay with 50.79 percent of the vote. The first draft of the LUC bill was released in January 2020, containing 457 articles divided into 10 chapters. It underwent subsequent modifications as a result of the negotiation between the different members of the Coalición Multicolor and the final version was presented on 9 April, with 502 articles.

The final bill of the LUC entered Parliament on 23 April 2020. Both in the Senate and in the Chamber of Representatives, special commissions made up of legislators from all political parties with parliamentary representation were formed for its analysis. Various individuals, public bodies, institutions and organizations were summoned by these commissions to learn their views on its content.

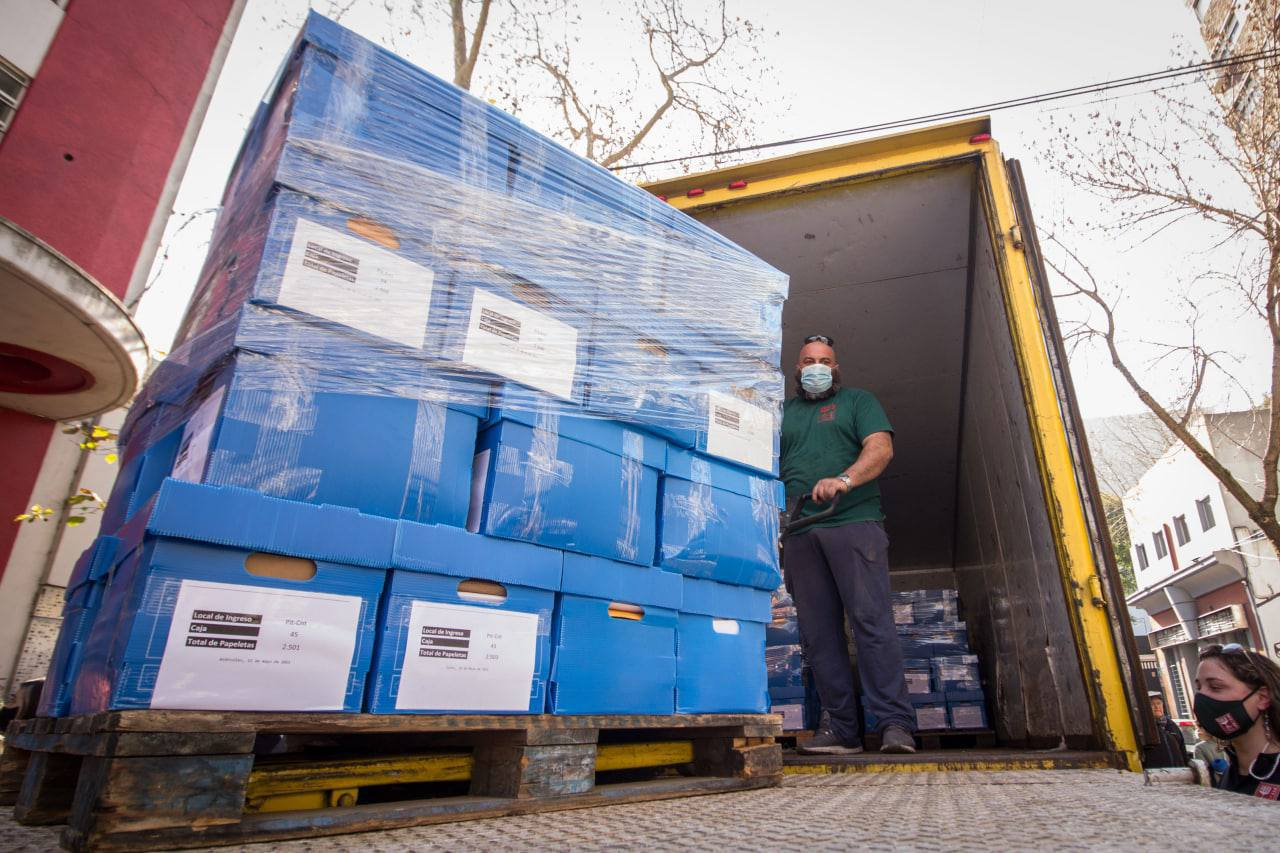
Boxes containing the almost 800,000 ballots that were delivered to the Electoral Court.

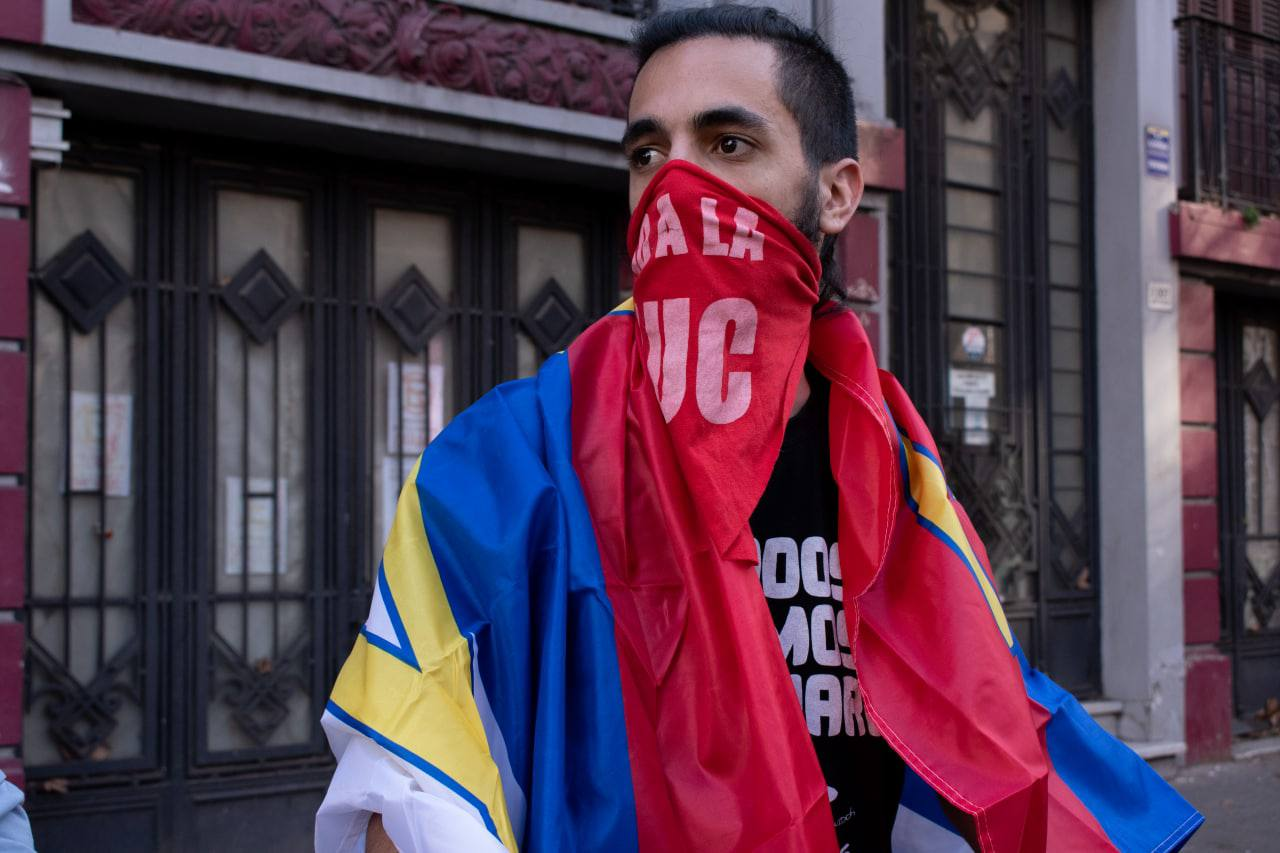
Militant of the Broad Front in favor of holding a referendum against the Law of Urgent Consideration.

After 25 articles were eliminated and more than 300 modified, the law was approved by the Senate in the first instance on 6 June 2020, after which it entered the Chamber of Representatives where 32 changes were introduced and it was approved on 5 July. Finally, the upper house approved its final version on the 8th of the same month with only the votes of the ruling coalition, and the Executive Power promulgated it a day later. President Lacalle Pou described it as a "necessary, fair and popular" instrument.

== Initiative ==
Before the LUC bill was sent to the Legislative Branch and later during the parliamentary discussion, the PIT-CNT trade union center spoke out against its contents and the use of the constitutional remedy of "urgent consideration", considering it a mechanism undemocratic, considering that it "limited" the political and social debate. On 4 June 2020, the workers' union held a demonstration in front of the Legislative Palace, during which its secretary general, Marcelo Abdala, stated that the LUC was not meeting the needs of the population in the context of the COVID-19 pandemic " neither in form nor in content. The ANCAP Federation (Fancap), a union of workers of the state fuel company ANCAP, was one of the first organizations to express itself in favor of filing a referendum against the LUC, considering it contrary to "the interests of the working class", according to its president Gerardo Rodríguez. One of the main points of objection was the elimination of ANCAP's monopoly for the import, export and refining of crude oil and derivatives, an issue that generated discussion even within the ruling coalition itself, and ended up being excluded from the bill during the parliamentary debate. Instead, it was established that the price of fuels be defined by the Executive Power, with an adjustment in line with the import parity price with a periodicity not exceeding sixty days, against which Fancap also manifested itself in disagreement.

In May, the National Political Board of the Broad Front expressed its rejection of the "urgent consideration" mechanism and characterized the bill as "inopportune, unconstitutional and undemocratic". During the parliamentary analysis, its legislators worked to incorporate various modifications, but they considered that the final version did not present substantial changes with respect to the original and, therefore, they maintained their negative vote on the bill, despite voting in favor of almost 50% of the articles.

On 9 September, the PIT-CNT officially announced for the first time that it would begin to analyze the possibility of developing a campaign with this objective, although at the moment it was not something definite. The campaign to collect signatures to file a referendum was confirmed on 17 October by Intersocial, a space made up of various social organizations in addition to the PIT-CNT, such as the Uruguayan Federation of Cooperatives for Mutual Savings (FUCVAM), the Intersocial Feminista and the Federation of University Students of Uruguay (FEUU). Two days later, on the 19th, the Broad Front decided to join the campaign, a decision ratified on the 23rd by the Board.

In Uruguay there are two ways to file a referendum appeal against a law before the Electoral Court. In one of them, it requires reaching the adhesions of 25% of the total number of registered voters in a period corresponding to the first year after the promulgation of the law and directly leads to the holding of the referendum. On the other hand, the other route requires reach at least 2% of the total number of registered voters eligible to vote within a period of 150 days after the enactment of the law and gives rise to the holding of an election with a non-compulsory vote known as a pre-referendum, in which if 25% vote affirmatively, a referendum must be held. Depending on the time required to collect signatures in each case, the first form is popularly known as "the long one" and the second as "the short one". At first, both the PIT-CNT and the Intersocial proposed to follow the "long way". On the Broad Front, this issue generated divisions, since the Communist Party (PC) and the Socialist Party supported the "long way", but other sectors such as the Movement of Popular Participation (MPP), the Uruguay Assembly (AU) and the Renovating Force (FR) preferred the "short way" given the risk implied by the high percentage of signatures required by the other mechanism.

On 8 December 2020, it was formally reported that the FA had also opted for the "long way", in agreement with social organizations. Another of the most important issues was whether the referendum would seek a total or partial repeal of the LUC and, in the latter case, which articles. In early December, as a result of an agreement between the different actors, it was announced that they would seek to repeal 133 articles, referring to the issues of public security, the economy, public companies, the agricultural sector, labor relations, social security and housing. In addition to the fact that among the articles to be repealed there were some that were voted by the FA in Parliament.

On 14 December, made up of the PIT-CNT, the FA and the Intersocial, the National Pro-Referendum Commission (later the National Commission for the YES) was installed. Four days later, the process formally began before the Electoral Court, and on 29 December 2020, the campaign to collect signatures began to repeal 135 articles of the Law of Urgent Consideration.

== Opinion polls ==
Date(s) conducted	Will you vote to repeal the 135 articles of the LUC?		Undecided	Blank/spoilt	Lead	Sample	Conducted by
Date(s) conducted	Yes	No	Undecided	Blank/spoilt	Lead	Sample	Conducted by
2022
18–22 March	43%	43%	10%	4%	N/A	400	UPC
17–22 March	41%	44%	14%	1%	3%	804	Opción
11–20 March	41%	45%	10%	4%	4%	1,006	Cifra
11–14 March	36%	41%	19%	4%	5%	900	Factum
19 February – 2 March	34%	35%	28%	3%	1%	1,209	Equipos
17–26 February	36%	38%	22%	4%	2%	800	Opción
12–22 February	32%	41%	22%	5%	9%	900	Factum
10–27 February	33%	45%	20%	2%	12%	809	Cifra
4–11 February	47%	42,6%	10,4%	N/A	4,4%	N/A	Nómade
26 January – 1 February	31%	41%	26%	2%	10%	500	Equipos
14–24 January	43%	38%	15%	3%	5%	400	UPC
2021
9–27 December	49,4%	41,2%	9,4%	N/A	8,2%	N/A	Nómade
25 November – 2 December	33%	46%	18%	3%	13%	500	Equipos
6–15 November	39%	51%	10%		12%	900	Factum
29 October – 8 November	37%	39%	19%	5%	2%	800	Opción
28 October – 7 November	41%	48%	11%	N/A	7%	800	Cifra
1–14 September	45%	50%	5%		5%	900	Factum
26 August – 3 September	34%	44%	22%	N/A	10%	707	Cifra
9–16 August	41%	37%	19%	3%	4%	800	Opción
22–31 July	43%	40%	11%	2%	3%	1,500	Radar
24 June – 3 July	34%	43%	23%	N/A	10%	1,003	Cifra
13–20 May	40%	38%	22%	N/A	2%	824	Opción

== Results ==
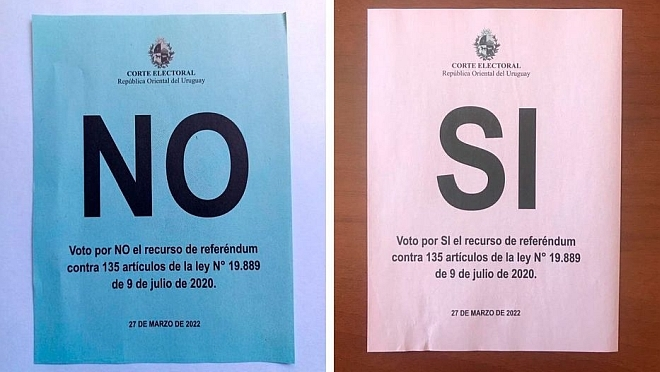
Ballots used in the referendum

Only three departments voted in favor of the repeal : Canelones, Montevideo, and Paysandú. While those against the repeal represented only 50.02%, the repeal failed by a wider margin as 50% of the total votes including blank votes was needed, when only 48.67% of this total voted for the repeal. The initial count had the yes at 48.82%, the No at 49.86% and the blank votes at 1.32%. While the failure of the votes for repeal to reach 50% was enough to declare a result, the margin was thin enough for the total of unassessed votes (those from people voting in a different polling station than their registered ones, usually ignored if the margin is higher) to be higher, forcing them to be counted for the first time.

Choice	Votes	%
For	1,078,425	48.67
Against	1,108,360	50.02
Blank	29,121	1.31
Total	2,215,906	100.00
Valid votes	2,215,906	96.39
Invalid votes	83,031	3.61
Total votes	2,298,937	100.00
Registered voters/turnout	2,684,131	85.65
Source: Corte Electoral

=== By department ===
Department	For	%	Against	%	Blank	%	Unassessed	Invalid	Total	Electorate	%
Artigas	16,556	32.25	34,232	66.68	548	1.07	11	1,160	52,507	63,121	83.18
Canelones	180,280	53.24	153,621	45.36	4,744	1.40	77	14,549	353,271	409,779	86.21
Cerro Largo	23,423	38.11	37,255	60.61	791	1.29	20	1,765	63,254	73,210	86.40
Colonia	38,872	43.62	49,162	55.16	1,087	1.22	37	3,173	92,331	106,001	87.10
Durazno	17,522	41.06	24,599	57.65	552	1.29	17	1,452	44,142	50,636	87.18
Flores	6,732	35.08	12,183	63.48	278	1.45	6	641	19,840	22,600	87.79
Florida	21,359	43.49	27,168	55.32	582	1.19	8	2,135	51,252	57,597	88.98
Lavalleja	15,237	35.20	27,359	63.20	694	1.60	3	1,726	45,019	51,040	88.20
Maldonado	47,945	40.39	69,161	58.26	1,600	1.35	27	5,188	123,921	142,277	87.10
Montevideo	468,268	55.86	358,775	42.80	11,216	1.34	210	32,370	870,839	1,029,113	84.62
Paysandú	40,391	50.97	37,975	47.92	879	1.11	18	2,502	81,765	95,285	85.81
Río Negro	17,237	45.39	20,257	53.34	480	1.26	9	1,178	39,161	46,490	84.24
Rivera	18,521	25.38	53,712	73.60	747	1.02	39	1,630	74,649	89,555	83.36
Rocha	22,498	43.57	28,301	54.81	839	1.62	4	2,279	53,921	62,454	86.34
Salto	41,633	47.66	44,790	51.28	926	1.06	22	2,026	89,397	104,046	85.92
San José	33,466	46.46	37,658	52.28	912	1.27	25	2,817	74,878	84,021	89.12
Soriano	28,931	46.93	31,958	51.84	753	1.22	15	2,230	63,887	75,294	84.85
Tacuarembó	25,514	38.69	39,464	59.85	965	1.46	12	2,196	68,151	78,732	86.56
Treinta y Tres	14,040	39.78	20,730	58.73	528	1.50	10	1,444	36,752	42,880	85.71
Total	1,078,425	48.67	1,108,360	50.02	29,121	1.31	570	82,461	2,298,937	2,684,131	85.65
Source: Corte Electoral
