= Carmelo Vidalín =

Uruguayan politician

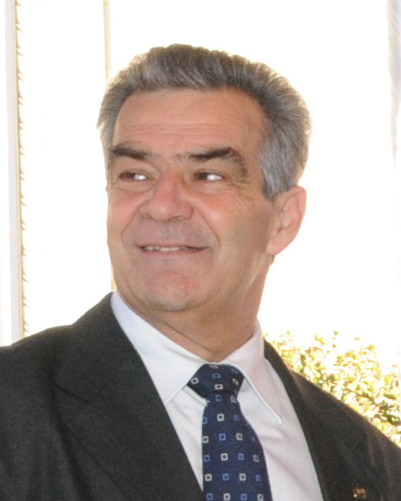

Intendant of Durazno Department
- Incumbent
- Assumed office 26 November 2020
- Preceded by: Jorge Reyna
- In office 9 July 2015 – 9 February 2020
- Preceded by: Benjamín Irazábal
- Succeeded by: Jorge Reyna
- In office 14 July 2000 – 2009
- Preceded by: Luis Hugo Apolo
- Succeeded by: Benjamín Irazábal

National Representative of Uruguay
- In office 15 February 2010 – 15 February 2015

Personal details
- Born: Carmelo José Vidalín Aguirre; 17 November 1955 (age 70) Durazno, Uruguay
- Party: National Party
- Education: University of the Republic
- Occupation: Politician

Carmelo José Vidalín Aguirre (born 17 November 1955) is a Uruguayan politician serving as Intendant of the Durazno Department since November 26, 2020. A member of the National Party, he previously served in the same position from 2000 to 2009 and from 2015 to 2020, as well as National Representative in the 47th Legislature (2010–2015).

Prior to entering politics, he worked as a philosophy teacher, and as a journalist in local media in his hometown. He began his local political career as a mayor and as an official in the Intendancy of Durazno, reaching the position of General Secretary. Due to the electoral results he was seen as a pre-presidential candidate for the 2009 presidential primaries. He is known for having been one of the promoters of the massive annual Pilsen Rock music festival that took place outskirts of Durazno in the 2000s.

== Early life and education ==
Vidalín was born and raised in Durazno. He attended the Marist Brothers' Colegio San Luis where he completed his primary and secondary education, and the Liceo Rubino.

In 2014 he obtained a Licentiate in labor relations from the University of the Republic.

== Political career ==
Vidalín began his political career in the 1980s, as an Edil (member of the department's legislature) from 1985 to 1989. In 1990 he was appointed Secretary General of the Intendancy of Durazno by Intendant Raúl Iturria Igarzábal. He served in the post until 1995, when he returned to a seat in the legislature.

In the 1999 general election, Vidalín was elected National Representative for the 45th Legislature, but promptly resigned to run for Intendant in the 2000 municipal elections, in which he was elected. In the 2004 general election he was elected Senator of the Republic, but again resigned from his seat. In the 2005 municipal elections he was again elected Intendant of Durazno with more than the 50% of the vote. In 2007 he served as an observer in the election in the Kingdom of Morocco.

In 2007, Vidalín began to be seen as a possible nationalist pre-candidate for the 2009 presidential primaries. However, in December 2008 he endorsed Luis Alberto Lacalle for president. In 2009, faced with the constitutional impossibility of a third term as Intendant of Durazno, Vidalín participated in the general election, being elected National Representative for the Department of Durazno in the 47th Legislature. In turn, in the third annual period (2012) he served as the fourth vice president of the Chamber.

In 2014 he was re-elected to the position of National Representative, but resigned to participate in the 2015 municipal election, in which he was elected Intendant of Durazno with 41.19% of the vote. In 2015 he obtained the Legion of the Book Award from the Uruguayan Book Chamber.

In September 2019, he was proclaimed the sole candidate of the National Party for the Intendant of Durazno in the 2020 municipal election. In the elections, which were postponed until September 27, 2020 due to the COVID-19 pandemic, Vidalín was reelected in the position for a fourth term with 48.5% of the vote.

== Personal life ==
He was married to María Isabel Ramos, a civil servant, with whom he had three children: Martín, Nicolás and Juan Ignacio.

In 2023, he participated in the television reality show ¿Quién es la máscara?, an adaptation of the South Korean format Masked Singer, ranking 8th.
