= Vamos Uruguay =

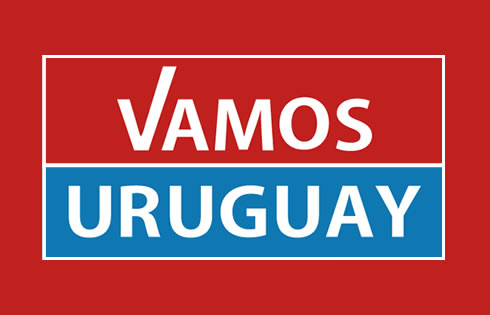
Vamos Uruguay logo

Vamos Uruguay (Spanish, 'Go Uruguay') is a political sector of the Colorado Party in Uruguay. It was founded by Pedro Bordaberry in 2007. It is considered to be the faction furthest to the right within the party, and is seen as the continuation of the old Riverist current. It opposes the direction of Battlist factions in the party.

In the 2009 Uruguayan general election, Vamos Uruguay members got a majority of Colorado votes. Since 2005, it has had three senators including Pedro Bordaberry, Germán Coutinho, and Ope Pasquet, as well as 14 representatives including Fernando Amado, Alma Mallo, Aníbal Gloodtofsky, Fitzgerald Cantero, Juan Manuel Garino y Juan Ángel Vázquez (Montevideo), Graciela Mattiaude (Canelones), Germán Cardoso (Maldonado), Gustavo Cersósimo (San José), Daniel Bianchi (Colonia), José Amy (Soriano), Martha Montaner (Tacuarembó), Walter Verri (Paysandú), and Cecilia Eguiluz (Salto).
