= 2020 Uruguayan municipal elections =

Local election

← 2015	27 September 2020	2025 →
- Winning party by department

Uruguay held departmental and local government elections on September 27, 2020, to elect the intendente of the 19 departments that are the administrative divisions of Uruguay, as well as 31 councilors; and a mayor and four councilors for each of the municipalities. Across the country, 19 intendants, 589 ediles, 125 mayors and 500 councilors were elected. This was the second time that both intendentes and alcaldes were elected simultaneously.

Initially, the election was to be held on May 10, however, in March 2020 all the political parties that made up the General Assembly, the Electoral Court and Vice President Beatriz Argimón, in a joint decision, agreed to postpone for the only time for Sunday, September 27, 2020 due to the coronavirus pandemic in the country.

== Election by department ==
In the municipal elections of May 2015, the Partido Nacional had won 12 departments, the Partido Colorado 1 departments, and the Frente Amplio 6 departments.

=== Artigas ===
Party	Candidates	Substitutes			Result		
Party	Candidates	1st.	2nd.	3rd.	%	Votes	Outcome
Broad Front	Gerardo García	Yamandú Olivera	Mirtha Tecco	Paula Chalart	7.25	3,537	Lost ✗
Broad Front	José González	Daniel Suárez	Mirta Artave	Elizabeth Alonzo	6.28	3,064	Lost ✗
Broad Front	Ricardo Xavier	Miriam da Rosa	Luis Ríos	Germán Ayala	8.65	4,225	Lost ✗
National Party	Raúl Arralde	Marcelo Díaz	Mario Sarasua	Angélica Bianchi	3.40	1,662	Lost ✗
National Party	Pablo Caram	Valentina dos Santos	Luis A. Rodríguez	Nieves Volpi	61.55	30,048	Elected ✓
National Party	Roque Moreira	Alejandro Olivera	Marta Fagúndez	Héctor Félix	6.29	3,069	Lost ✗
Colorado Party	Renato Sambucetti	Luis A. Rodríguez	Sonia Godoy	Juan Godoy	2.88	1,408	Lost ✗
Colorado Party	Cecilia Umpiérrez	Otto Fernández	Antonio J. Brum	Silvia Cortazzo	3.57	1,741	Lost ✗
Popular Assembly	Hugo Ribeiro	Alcibides dos Santos	Sandra Ribeiro	Juan Carlos Silva	0.13	63	Lost ✗

=== Canelones ===
Party	Candidate	Substitutes			Result		
Party	Candidate	1st.	2nd.	3rd.	%	Votes	Outcome
Broad Front	Yamandú Orsi	Marcelo Metediera	Gabriela Garrido	Alejandro Alberro	61.00	180,200	Elected ✓
National Party	Amin Niffouri	Alfonso Lerete	Álvaro Dastugue	Rosa Imoda	19.67	58,107	Lost ✗
National Party	Javier Radiccioni	Adrián Silva	Gonzalo Medina	Cecilia Marchi	10.49	30,978	Lost ✗
Colorado Party	Diego Castro	Andrés Moura	Daniel Haro	Paola dos Santos	5.03	14,846	Lost ✗
Popular Assembly	Milton Franco	Jorge Pérez	Mario Lista	Mary Johnston	0.41	1,203	Lost ✗
Green Animalist Party	Fabián Negreira	Paula Sosa	Claudia Curbelo	Lucía Arbes	0.42	1,230	Lost ✗
Open Cabildo	Álvaro Perrone	Hebert Pintos	Mónica Peña	Roberto Pereira	1.94	5,717	Lost ✗
Open Cabildo	María Inés Monzillo	Ana García	Sandra Faud	Walter Taberne	1.06	3,143	Lost ✗

=== Cerro Largo ===
Party	Candidate	Substitutes			Result		
Party	Candidate	1st.	2nd.	3rd.	%	Votes	Outcome
Broad Front	Rodolfo Nin Novoa	Luis Fratti	Yisela Araújo	José Aquino	13.08	8,118	Lost ✗
National Party	José Yurramendi	Fernando Gamarra	Graciela Echenique	Marcos López	43.86	27,215	Elected ✓
National Party	Carlos Duarte	Adrián Silva	Gonzalo Medina	Cecilia Marchi	42.00	26,061	Lost ✗
Colorado Party	John K. Rodríguez	Mauricio Crosa	Zulma Ferreyra	Mónica Cardozo	1.05	652	Lost ✗

=== Colonia ===
Party	Candidate	Substitutes			Result		
Party	Candidate	1st.	2nd.	3rd.	%	Votes	Outcome
Broad Front	Jorge Mota	Gabriel Matonte	Laura Irigoin	Alejandro Nario	26.95	21,321	Lost ✗
Broad Front	Ricardo A. Beltran	Luisa Espinosa	Edison Torres	María Cristina Araujo	10.38	8,213	Lost ✗
National Party	Carlos Moreira	Guillermo Rodríguez	María de Lima	Andrés Passarino	39.54	31,278	Elected ✓
National Party	Ricardo Planchón	Exequiel Carballo	Walter Zimmer	Silvia Hernández	14.05	11,112	Lost ✗
National Party	Eduardo López	Jorge Osta Rebellato	María Imperial	Nilda Matter	1.05	828	Lost ✗
Colorado Party	Nibia Reisch	Emilio Fernández	Carlos Foderé	Mery Rivoir	5.64	4,459	Lost ✗
Colorado Party	Daniel Forets	Andrés Durán	Adrián Michelin	Isabel Sánchez	1.98	1,570	Lost ✗
Popular Assembly	Daniel Rey	Eduardo Pelegrinetti	Estrellita Nuñez	Emanuel Olaverry	0.42	333	Lost ✗

=== Durazno ===
Party	Candidate	Substitutes			Result		
Party	Candidate	1st.	2nd.	3rd.	%	Votes	Outcome
Broad Front	Raúl Licandro	Francisco Sosa	Yeni Niche	Rosario Juambeltz	7.95	3,160	Lost ✗
Broad Front	Laura Baldenegro	María Isabel da Rosa	Carlos Viera	Carla Píriz	8.62	3,424	Lost ✗
Broad Front	Magdalena Recoba	María Bochiardo	Mario Sappia	Juan Delgado	7.50	2,982	Lost ✗
National Party	Carmelo Vidalin	José Rielli	Diego Ávila	María del Rosario Morena	55.42	22,024	Elected ✓
Colorado Party	Ana Hunter	Nelson D'Alessandro	Luis Correa	Yovana Souza	5.01	1,989	Lost ✗
Colorado Party	Edgardo H. Lerena	Edgardo D. Lerena	Blanca Mechelk	Bernardo Cataldo	4.44	1,763	Lost ✗
Colorado Party	Darío Martínez	Guzmán Acosta y Lara	Teresita Valenzuela	Javier Cordero	2.87	1,140	Lost ✗
Independent Party	Carlos Arreiz	Ruben de León	María A. Areosa	Humberto Trentini	0.94	375	Lost ✗
Popular Assembly	Martín Barrero	Roberto Correa	Nair Charlo		0.86	343	Lost ✗
Open Cabildo	Carlos M. Kuster	Héctor Fernández	Rossana Azar	Elvira García	2.28	906	Lost ✗
Open Cabildo	Guillermo Gurbindo	Manuel González	Walter Acuña	María Noel Olivera	4.11	1,634	Lost ✗

=== Flores ===
Party	Candidate	Substitutes			Result		
Party	Candidate	1st.	2nd.	3rd.	%	Votes	Outcome
Broad Front	Federico Ruíz	Luciana Irizabal	Roberto Rodríguez	Luciana Bentancor	15.05	2,818	Lost ✗
Broad Front	Roberto Gómez	Olga Silva	Fernando Oholeguy	Pamela Valiente	3.21	601	Lost ✗
Broad Front	Rivana Pedreira	Bruno Durán	Andrés Coitiño	Nancy González	3.78	708	Lost ✗
National Party	Fernando Echeverría	María C. Bidegaín	Armando Castaingdebat	Luis A. Montes de Oca	53.58	10,033	Elected ✓
Colorado Party	Claudio Aguilar	Hugo Moreira	Juan Máspoli	María E. Pedreira	10.80	2,022	Lost ✗
Colorado Party	Walter Naddeo	Horacio Bellini	Andrea Quevedo	Julián Rodríguez	2.05	383	Lost ✗
Colorado Party	Horacio Rodríguez	María Ramírez	Julio Etchegoimberry	Natalí Bidart	6.50	1,217	Lost ✗
Popular Assembly	Joel Leal	Carlos Giménez	Sandra Molina	Hugo González	0.29	54	Lost ✗
Open Cabildo	Numan Blanco	María Friedman	Iván Chulepin	Dahiana Dayuto	4.75	889	Lost ✗

=== Florida ===
Party	Candidate	Substitutes			Result		
Party	Candidate	1st.	2nd.	3rd.	%	Votes	Outcome
Broad Front	Álvaro Vega	Lorena Azpiroz	Fernándo Schiavoni	María Álvarez	18.85	8,753	Lost ✗
Broad Front	Mariana Lorier	Susana Nieto	Julio Tambasco	Felipe Jaurena	10.51	4,882	Lost ✗
Broad Front	Eduardo Riviezzi	Teresita Martínez	Ariel Palleiro	Fernándo Pérez	5.45	2,533	Lost ✗
National Party	Guillermo López	Marcos Pérez	Delia Mutay	Mario Lapasta	48.91	22,711	Elected ✓
National Party	Fernándo Pérez	Gustavo Bello	Evangelina Basignani	Alexis Lissio	4.94	2,293	Lost ✗
Colorado Party	Pablo Lanz Adib	Nicolás Urchitano	Rossana Bia Vega	Diego Machín	6.16	2,861	Lost ✗
Colorado Party	Claudio Fernández	Daniel Martínez	Cono Abreu	María F. Amaro	2.86	1,326	Lost ✗
Open Cabildo	Flavia Silva	Wilson Serra	Andrea Perazza	Elida Daluz	1.31	610	Lost ✗
Open Cabildo	Isabel Marisol	Santiago Chifteian	Adriana Centena	Sonia Blandor	1.01	468	Lost ✗

=== Lavalleja ===
Party	Candidate	Substitutes			Result		
Party	Candidate	1st.	2nd.	3rd.	%	Votes	Outcome
Broad Front	Julián Mazzoni	Yliana Fernández	Hebert Clavijo	Isabel Urquiola	9.64	3,901	Lost ✗
Broad Front	Pablo Fuentes	Rossana Jaimés	Pablo Cossio	Maria R. López	5.19	2,102	Lost ✗
Broad Front	Cecilia Bianco	Walter Ximénez	María E. Leis	Mery Felicitá	7.92	3,203	Lost ✗
National Party	Carol Aviaga	Eliana Alzugaray	Martín Rezk	Alejandra Pereira	25.51	10,325	Lost ✗
National Party	Mario García	Hernán Vergara	Lidia Araújo	Pablo Hernández	34.43	13,931	Elected ✓
Colorado Party	Julio C. Sánchez	TBA	TBA	TBA	1.55	629	Lost ✗
Colorado Party	Luis M. Carrese	Fernándo Toledo	Inés Gardil	Javier Fernández	10.12	4,097	Lost ✗
Independent Party	Estrella Cabana	Ruth Mattos	Roberto Bergero	Raúl Rubilde	0.45	183	Lost ✗
Popular Assembly	Julio Tellechea	Sergio Charquero	José M. Gorgoroso	Cristina Díaz	0.30	121	Lost ✗
Open Cabildo	Sandra Inzaurralde	Ignacio Bevilacqua	Miguel del Puerto	Sandra Colman	4.88	1,975	Lost ✗

=== Maldonado ===
Party	Candidate	Substitutes			Result		
Party	Candidate	1st.	2nd.	3rd.	%	Votes	Outcome
Broad Front	Gerardo Viñales	Carlos Huelmo	María A. Laurenzena	Roberto Domínguez	4.12	4,484	Lost ✗
Broad Front	Susana Hernández	Fabiana Danta	Gonzálo Zorrilla	Carmen Suárez	9.71	10,577	Lost ✗
Broad Front	Óscar de los Santos	Gustavo Salaberry	Estela Delgado	Carlos Corujo	14.77	16,091	Lost ✗
National Party	Enrique Antía	Luis Pereira	Adriana Graziuso	Indalecio Pígola	43.61	47,492	Elected ✓
National Party	Rodrigo Blas	Alejandro Lussich	Fernándo Servetto	María S. Iriarte	19.56	21,305	Lost ✗
Colorado Party	Eduardo Elinger	Germán Cardoso	Rita Garateguy	Haroldo Pi	0.69	755	Lost ✗
Colorado Party	Félix Riestra	Blanca dos Santos	Diego Mansilla	Daniel Martínez	4.48	4,877	Lost ✗
Popular Assembly	Carlos Pérez	Luciano Abelenda	Selva Pastorini	Pamela Rodríguez	0.52	565	Lost ✗
Green Animalist Party	Enrique Cenoz	Laura Magis	Aníbal Pereira	Adriana Alfonso	0.51	554	Lost ✗
Open Cabildo	Gaspar Barrabino	Eduardo Ulery	Laura Bonifacio	Washington Pereira	0.80	874	Lost ✗
Open Cabildo	Sebastián Cal	Kevin Fuentes	Soraya Silva	Raúl Blanco	1.22	1,334	Lost ✗

=== Montevideo ===
Party	Candidate	Substitutes				Result		
Party	Candidate	1st.	2nd.	3rd.	4th.	%	Votes	Outcome
Broad Front	Carolina Cosse	Mauricio Zunino (PS)	Federico Graña (PCU)	María E. Mazzoti (Casa Grande)	Isabel Andreoni	22.74	184,364	Elected ✓
Broad Front	Daniel Martínez	Pablo Ferreri (Asamblea Uruguay)	Laura Tabárez (Plataforma)	Analice Beron (Vertiente Artiguista)	Isabel Andreoni	12.96	105,050	Lost ✗
Broad Front	Álvaro Villar	Pablo Inthamoussu (MPP)	Partricia Roland (Fuerza Renovadora)	Fernando Amado (UNIR)	Isabel Andreoni	20.07	162,657	Lost ✗
Coalición Multicolor	Laura Raffo	Andrés Ojeda (PC)	José L. Alonso (CA)	Romina Fasulo (PG)	Juan C. Rodríguez (PI)	43.33	351,207	Lost ✗
Popular Assembly	Eduardo Rubio	Valeria Sánchez	Milton Rodríguez	Vivianne Gómez	Marta Belles	0.46	3,765	Lost ✗
Green Animalist Party	Leonel García	Claudia Libby	Manuel Daguerre	Ángel Díaz	-	0.44	3,529	Lost ✗

=== Paysandú ===
Party	Candidate	Substitutes			Result		
Party	Candidate	1st.	2nd.	3rd.	%	Votes	Outcome
Broad Front	Cecilia Bottino	Luis F. Burjel	Silvia Belvisi	Omar Araújo	11.82	9,118	Lost ✗
Broad Front	Marco García	Claudio Quintana	Margarita Heinzen	Alberto Zinno	3.30	2,542	Lost ✗
Broad Front	Guillermo Caraballo	Marcelo Romero	Liliana Gros	Federico Álvarez	27.68	21,344	Lost ✗
National Party	Mario Bandera	Carlos Leoni	Luciana Osaba	Claudio Zanoniani	15.21	11,729	Lost ✗
National Party	Bertil Bentos	Rafael Bartzabal	Roberto Davyt	Myriam Lamela	5.52	4,259	Lost ✗
National Party	Nicolás Olivera	Nancy Nuñez	Fermín Farinha	Eduardo van Hoff	31.18	24,043	Elected ✓
Colorado Party	Martín Irrazabal	Ricardo Molinelli	Beatríz Moreira	Juan C. Moreno	1.52	1,172	Lost ✗
Colorado Party	David Helguera	Yomely Flores	Renzo Spolzino	Ubaldo Gardiol	2.63	2,025	Lost ✗
Popular Assembly	Rossana Pereira	Rossana Pérez	Washington Dolimar	Jorge Azziz	0.47	365	Lost ✗
Partido Ecologista Radical Intransigente	Marcelo Fagúndez	María Gelvéz	Marcelo Weare	María Perdomo	0.67	515	Lost ✗

=== Río Negro ===
Party	Candidate	Substitutes			Result		
Party	Candidate	1st.	2nd.	3rd.	%	Votes	Outcome
Broad Front	Oscar Terzaghi	Sylvia Ibarguren	Maria J. Rodríguez	Álvaro Martínez	44.37	16,280	Lost ✗
National Party	Pablo Delgrosso	Guillermo Bordoli	Silvia Borba	Javier López	15.22	5,585	Elected ✓
National Party	Omar Lafluf	Jorge Gallo	Griselda Crevoisier	Fabricio Tisconia	33.64	12,343	Lost ✗
Colorado Party	Juan C. Serres	Daniel Porro	Alba Silva	Rafael Gandulfo	2.71	993	Lost ✗
Colorado Party	Angel Pavloff	Andrés Cianciarulo	Cristiana Rostán	Cristian Rosas	4.05	1,486	Lost ✗
Open Cabildo	Jorge González	Ecilda Sauleda	Jorge W. Morgan	Juana González	0.00	1.41	Lost ✗
Open Cabildo	Eduardo Poggio	Gabriela Konajovich	Ramón Salvatierra	Belis Masseilot	0.00	0.70	Lost ✗

=== Rivera ===
Party	Candidate	Substitutes			Result		
Party	Candidate	1st.	2nd.	3rd.	%	Votes	Outcome
Broad Front	Martires Etchecury	Carla Pérez	Jorge García	Cibela da Fontoura	4.92	3,426	Lost ✗
Broad Front	Aida Gonzálvez	Eduardo Pereyra	Carmelo Aristimuño	Cbela da Fontoura	4.48	3,120	Lost ✗
National Party	Ricardo Araújo	Fernando Araújo	Martha González	Solís Vidarte	10.77	7,496	Lost ✗
National Party	Milton Machado	Sabrina García	Luis García	Alberto Brizolara	6.65	4,631	Lost ✗
National Party	Pablo Saravia	Natalia López	Miguel González	Valdomir Macedo	7.81	5,437	Lost ✗
Colorado Party	Richard Sander	José Mazzoni	Neide Estévez	Alejandro Bertín	43.84	30,521	Elected ✓
Colorado Party	Mauricio González	Milton Soares	Nuri Marcelina	Heber Díaz	14.27	9,931	Lost ✗
Colorado Party	José Montejo	Anabella Traverso	Beatriz Centi	Enrique Núñez	2.19	1,525	Lost ✗
Popular Assembly	Jorge Díaz	Bianca Feo	José Lotito	Nair	0.13	91	Lost ✗
Open Cabildo	Carlos M. Laguzzi	Silvia Olivera	Waldemar Mancebo	Beder Taroco	4.94	3,438	Lost ✗

=== Rocha ===
Party	Candidate	Substitutes			Result		
Party	Candidate	1st.	2nd.	3rd.	%	Votes	Outcome
Broad Front	Artigas Barrios	Darcy de los Santos	Flora Vero	María Laxalte	8.96	4,361	Lost ✗
Broad Front	Mary Urse	Roberto Méndez	Graciela Darrospide	Paulo García	4.24	2,061	Lost ✗
Broad Front	Aníbal Pereyra	Marcelo Vaselli	Mauricio Moreno	Susana Puig	33.49	16,296	Lost ✗
National Party	Alejo Umpiérrez	Nicolás García	Cristina Silvera	Germán Magalhaes	37.17	18,087	Elected ✓
National Party	José C. Cardoso	Carlos Tarabochia	Marta Canova	Juan M. Olivera	3.74	1,820	Lost ✗
National Party	Martín Rodríguez	Roberto Rodríguez	José L. Molina	Silvia Arimón	8.50	4,137	Lost ✗
Colorado Party	Gerardo de León	Alejandro Tarán	Noelia Estol	Verónica Preyones	1.70	827	Lost ✗
Colorado Party	Enrique Campos	Juan C. Contreras	Mikaela Dianessi	Mauro Lorenzo	1.55	755	Lost ✗
Popular Assembly	Miguel Sosa	Juan C. Ferreira	Daniel Hernández	Elena Ema	0.22	109	Lost ✗
Green Animalist Party	Ana Cordano	María G. Feola	Fabián Rodríguez	Maria N. Cabral	0.42	204	Lost ✗

=== Salto ===
Party	Candidate	Substitutes			Result		
Party	Candidate	1st.	2nd.	3rd.	%	Votes	Outcome
Broad Front	Andrés Lima	Gustavo Chiriff	Sandra Mabel	Juan Cesio	34.73	30,336	Elected ✓
Broad Front	Soledad Marazzano	María Azambuja	Jorge de Souza	Pablo Alves	7.39	6,458	Lost ✗
National Party	Carlos Albisu	Walter Texeira	Rosa Blanco	Alquiles Mainardi	31.49	27,502	Lost ✗
National Party	Francisco Blardoni	Rodrigo Goñi	Enrique Piastri	Adriana Chaibun	4.51	3,938	Lost ✗
National Party	César Mari	Carlos Secco	Arturo Astudillo	Elena Rattin	1.02	895	Lost ✗
Colorado Party	Germán Coutinho	Joaquín Sant Anna	Eduardo Minutti	Elizabeth Machiavello	18.58	16,233	Lost ✗
Colorado Party	Gonzálo Leal	Julio C. Franchi	Serramna Cabrera	Noel González	1.09	956	Lost ✗
Colorado Party	Miguel Feris	Alejandro Campos	Hermes Morales	María de los Ángeles Márquez	0.91	796	Lost ✗
Popular Assembly	José Buslón	Luis Gómez	Cristina Pedetti	Juan Román	0.26	231	Lost ✗

=== San José ===
Party	Candidate	Substitutes			Result		
Party	Candidate	1st.	2nd.	3rd.	%	Votes	Outcome
Broad Front	María Noel Battaglino	Heber Sellanes	Fernanda Ceballos	Gonzálo Rodríguez	22.04	14,130	Lost ✗
Broad Front	Pablo Urreta	Soledad Díaz	Daniel Blanco	Nelson Hernández	14.89	9,551	Lost ✗
National Party	Ana María Bentaberri	Carlos Badano	Amalia Etcheverrigaray	Daniel Leyes	53.82	34,514	Elected ✓
National Party	César Zunino	Juan Menéndez	Gimena More	Juan Benzano	2.47	1,583	Lost ✗
Colorado Party	Alfredo Lago	Gonzálo Magnou	Esmeralda Zaro	Martín Modernel	2.26	1,451	Lost ✗
Colorado Party	Washington Almada	Dorcey Cuello	Silvia Rodríguez	Yoana Bauzá	1.14	729	Lost ✗
Independent Party	Luis A. Noya	Tomás Puerto	María del Carmen Grillo	Pedro Travieso	0.66	426	Lost ✗
Popular Assembly	Darío Camilo	Alejandro Sesser	Fiorella Campanella	Daniel López	0.47	301	Lost ✗
Open Cabildo	Edgar García	Dardo Carsin	María E. Larrañaga	José L. González	2.25	1,440	Lost ✗

=== Soriano ===
Party	Candidate	Substitutes			Result		
Party	Candidate	1st.	2nd.	3rd.	%	Votes	Outcome
Broad Front	Julio Guastavino	Elsa Barolín	William Kelland	Carla di Stasio	8.50	4,953	Lost ✗
Broad Front	Inocencio Bertoni	Elena Cuadrado	Leonardo Rey	Mariana Gross	3.96	2,306	Lost ✗
Broad Front	Pablo Ponce	Verónica Suárez	Ramón Mastandrea	Carolina Llanes	13.33	7,770	Lost ✗
National Party	Julio Besozzi	Ruben Valentín	Daniel Gastán	María Celia	45.03	26,253	Elected ✓
National Party	José L. Gómez	María Sarutte	José M. Lavista	Luciado Andriolo	14.64	8,534	Lost ✗
Colorado Party	Andrés Centurión	Juan M. Santellán	Roberto Fernández	Silvana Melazzi	6.79	3,960	Lost ✗
Colorado Party	Jorge Marroig	Otto Luhers	Marisa de Pazos	Isabel González	2.55	1,488	Lost ✗
Colorado Party	Federico Barboza	Vicente Rivero	Mirta Acuña	Ariel Gabarrot	1.36	792	Lost ✗
Popular Assembly	Raúl Perdomo	Javier Rodríguez	Catalina Fernández	Enrique Rey	0.26	150	Lost ✗
Partido Ecologista Radical Intransigente	Alejandro Cairus	Dorian Armand	Leticia Gómez	Dora Scasso	1.51	882	Lost ✗
Open Cabildo	Raúl Perdomo	Javier Rodríguez	Catalina Fernández	Enrique Rey	2.07	1,207	Lost ✗

=== Tacuarembó ===
Party	Candidate	Substitutes			Result		
Party	Candidate	1st.	2nd.	3rd.	%	Votes	Outcome
Broad Front	Edgardo Rodríguez	Rudyard Esquivo	Sheila Tarde	Wilton Núñez	10.20	6,491	Lost ✗
Broad Front	César González	César Guerrero	Silvia Real	Jesús Casco	8.51	5,419	Lost ✗
National Party	Wilson Ezquerra	Eber da Rosa	Greysi Araújo	Sergio Núñez	40.52	25,792	Elected ✓
National Party	José de Mattos	Julio Cardozo	Narcio López	Magdalena Ercilia	21.66	13,785	Lost ✗
Colorado Party	Federico Silva	José Velázquez	Ana Duarte	Juan Monteverde	5.58	3,549	Lost ✗
Colorado Party	Cristina Secco	Walter Rodríguez	Séptimo Bálsamo	Gianella Gularte	2.62	1,668	Lost ✗
Popular Assembly	Solís Echeverría	Ivo Ferreira	Paloma Sánchez	Irene Echenagusía	0.31	196	Lost ✗
Open Cabildo	Luis Gandolfo	María Castelli	Miguel Bener	Gloria Dutra	10.61	6,756	Lost ✗

=== Treinta y Tres ===
Party	Candidate	Substitutes			Result		
Party	Candidate	1st.	2nd.	3rd.	%	Votes	Outcome
Broad Front	José L. Acosta	Susana Bouyssounade	Marcos Abude	Jimena Acosta	4.97	1,721	Lost ✗
Broad Front	Fernándo Techera	Gerardo Amaral	Carmen Ipuche	Néstor Waldemar	3.11	1,076	Lost ✗
Broad Front	Mario Motta	Gerardo Amaral	Ana Palacio	Néstor Waldemar	12.58	4,354	Lost ✗
National Party	Mario Silvera	Luis Rodríguez	Eduardo González	Daniela Elosegui	36.36	12,590	Elected ✓
National Party	José Olano	Héctor Barrios	Germán Chebataroff	Cristina Cedréz	3.53	1,223	Lost ✗
National Party	Ramón da Silva	Fernándo Cuello	Mabel Quintela	José González	36.19	12,529	Lost ✗
Colorado Party	Martín Techera	Rúben Becerra	Stefanía Achabal	Hegard Estrella	1.25	432	Lost ✗
Colorado Party	Hugo Lima	Francisco Iginis	Eva Hernández	Aldo Cheloni	1.62	560	Lost ✗
Popular Assembly	María Pereira	Antonio Jorge	Fredy Burgos	Flor Silva	0.40	137	Lost ✗

== See also ==
- 2019 Uruguayan general election
