= Tabaré Hackenbruch =

Uruguayan politician

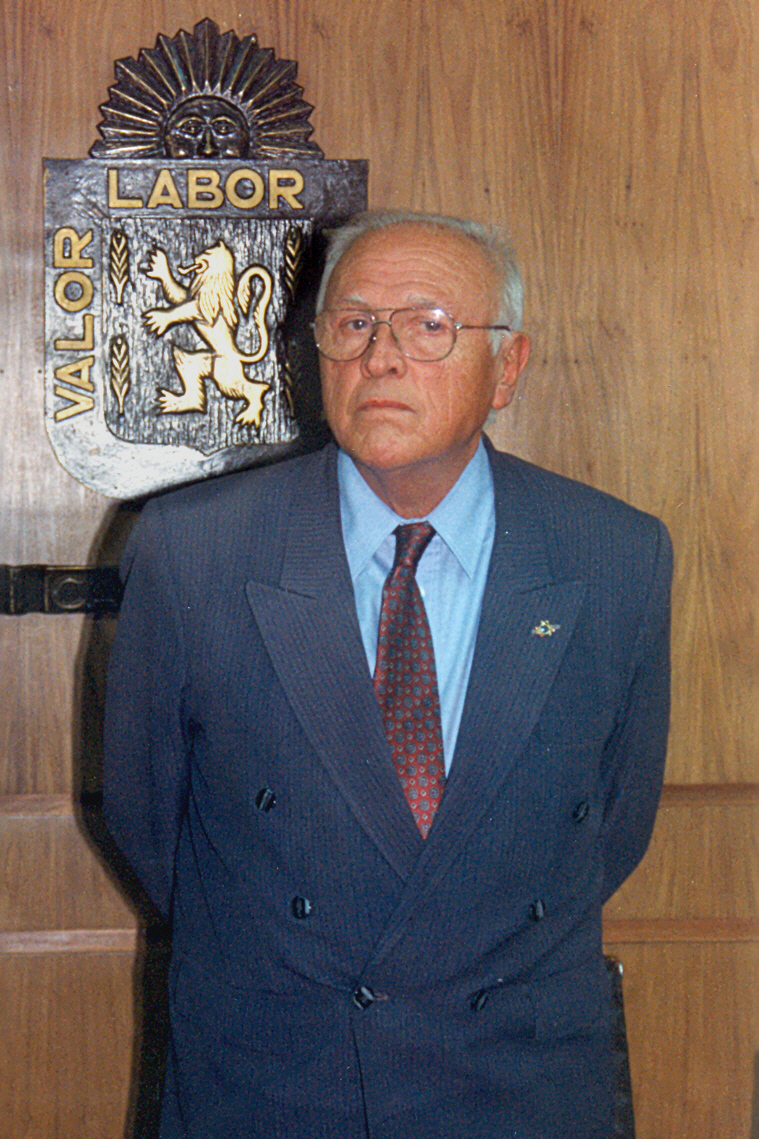
Tabaré Hackenbruch

Tabaré Hackenbruch (born 26 November 1928 in Canelones-ib. 19 June 2017) was an Uruguayan politician.

== Biography ==
A member of the Colorado Party, he started his long political career supporting the successful candidacy of Tomás Berreta for President. He also worked in the newspaper Acción alongside Julio María Sanguinetti.

Hackenbruch was elected Mayor of Canelones Department for three terms: 1985-1990, 1995-2000 and 2000-2005; in the 2000 election, he had the support of several politicians from the National Party, with the manifest intention of avoiding a victory of the Broad Front.

In the end he had very low approval ratings and a lot of irregularities were reported.
