= Eduardo Malaquina =

Uruguayan politician (1936–2021)

Eduardo Malaquina (1936 – 9 April 2021) was an Uruguayan politician who served as a Senator.
