= Ana Lía Piñeyrúa =

Uruguayan lawyer and politician (born 1954)

Minister of Labor and Social Affairs
- In office 1 March 1995 – 7 December 1999
- Preceded by: Ricardo Reilly Salaverri
- Succeeded by: Juan Ignacio Mangado

Personal details
- Born: 23 November 1954 (age 71) Montevideo, Uruguay
- Party: National Party
- Education: University of the Republic

Ana Lía Piñeyrúa Olmos (born 23 November 1954) is a Uruguayan lawyer and politician who served as Minister of Labor from 1995 to 1999. A member of the National Party, she was appointed to the Electoral Court of Uruguay in 2017.

== Biography ==
Ana Lía Piñeyrúa Olmos graduated with a law degree from the University of the Republic and was a supporter of the National Party from a young age. She was the first woman to serve on the Board of Directors of the National Party, serving from 1983 to 1984. During the 1980s she was affiliated with the ACF faction of the National Party. In 1987, while a member of the Movimiento Nacional de Rocha, she criticized blanket amnesties offered in the aftermath of the civic-military dictatorship of Uruguay. She was elected to the Chamber of Deputies during the 1989 Uruguayan general election and served until 1995.

In 1995, President Julio María Sanguinetti of the Colorado Party appointed her as Minister of Labour and Social Welfare in his coalition government; she worked with Ariel Davrieux, then head of the Office of Planning and Budget, to successfully reform Uruguay's pension system. She was a regional director for the International Labour Organization from 1999 to 2009.

Piñeyrúa was returned to the legislature in the 2009 Uruguayan general election, this time affiliated with the Concordia Nacional movement. She stood down for the 2014 Uruguayan general election, having withdrawn from the Concordia Nacional and endorsed Jorge Larrañaga for the National Party's presidential primary.

In 2017, she was appointed to the Electoral Court of Uruguay by the National Party.
