= Fernando Amado =

Uruguayan politician (born 1982)

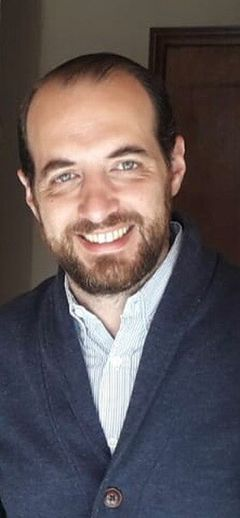
- Fernando Amado in 2021.
- Born: Fernando Amado Fernández; 11 September 1982 (age 44); Montevideo, Uruguay
- Education: University of the Republic
- Occupations: political scientist, writer, politician
- Political party: Colorado Party (2001-2018); Broad Front (2019-present)
- Spouse: Florencia Querol (2017–2021)
- Parent(s): Esther Fernández; Fernán Amado
- Awards: Premio Libro de Oro; Premio Bartolomé Hidalgo

Fernando Amado (born 11 September 1982) is a Uruguayan political scientist, writer and politician.

== Biography ==
Son Esther Fernández and former Commander in Chief of the Army Lt. Gral. Fernán Amado.

He studied political science at the University of the Republic and graduated with a bachelor's degree. As a child, he closely followed the Julio María Sanguinetti and Hugo Batalla campaigns in the 1994 elections.

== Political Activities ==
His first political achievement was securing one of two seats as a Colorado Party convention delegate —the other seat being held by Martín Bueno. On March 3, 2007, at a national assembly held in Trinidad, he became a founding member of the *Vamos Uruguay* faction led by Pedro Bordaberry. Within *Vamos Uruguay*, he established the *Vamos Montevideo* group and worked actively on the 2009 primary elections, securing second place in Montevideo. In the October parliamentary elections, he was elected as a deputy for Montevideo, serving terms from 2010 to 2015 and from 2015 to 2020.

== Books ==
- 2007, Desconfianza infinita.
- 2008, En penumbras.
- 2009, El peso de la cruz.
- 2010, Óscar Magurno.
- 2011, La masonería uruguaya.
- 2012, Mandato de sangre.
- 2013, Bajo sospecha.
- 2015, El club de los millones.
- 2019, La máscara de la diversidad.
- 2020, La masonería Uruguaya.
- 2023, Manini.
- 2025, Conspiración Repúblicana.
