= Cementerio Israelita, La Paz =

Jewish cemetery in Uruguay

Cementerio Israelita de La Paz
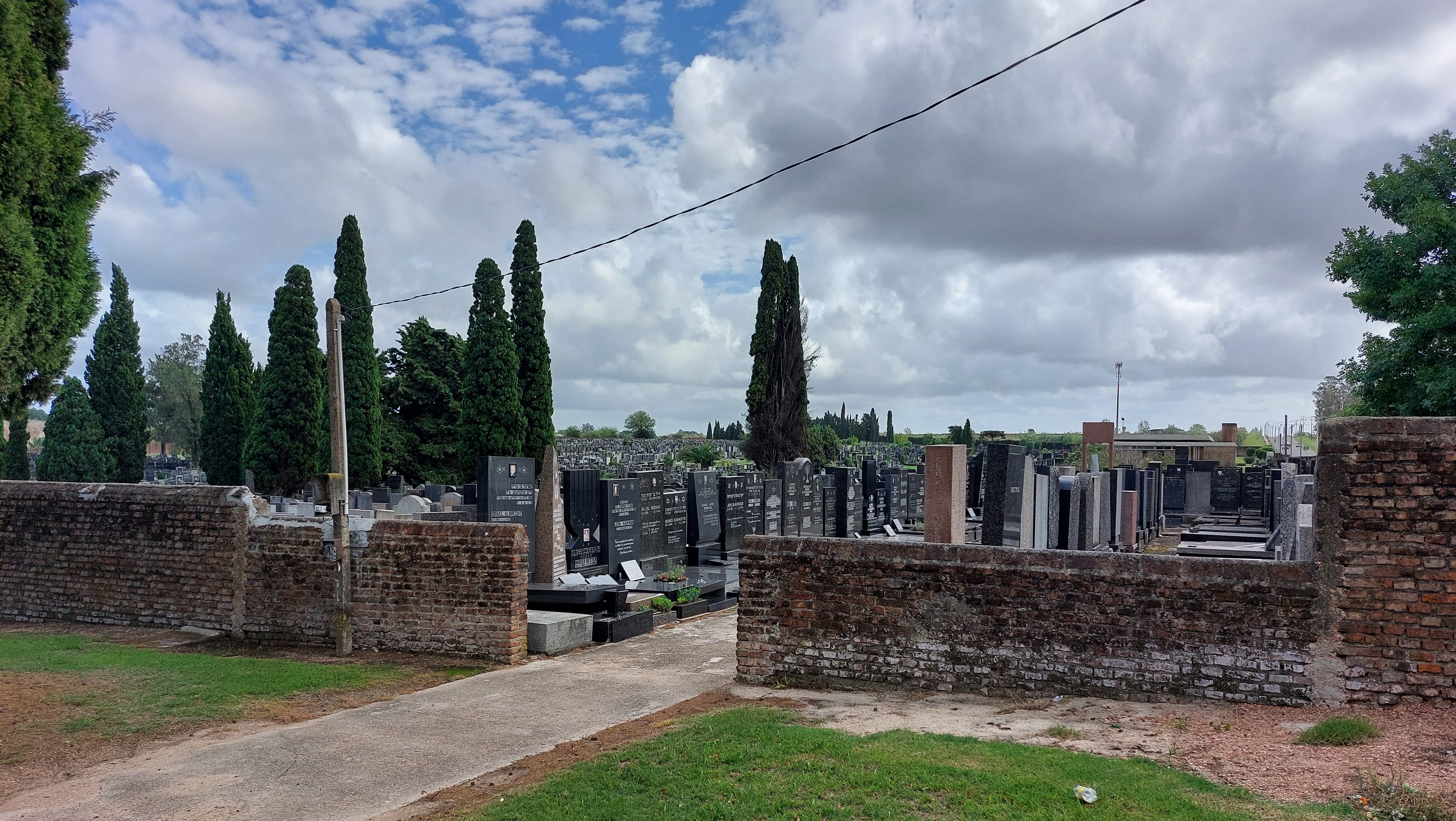
- Interactive map of Cementerio Israelita de La Paz

Details
- Established: 28 November 1917 (age 108)
- Location: La Paz, Canelones
- Country: Uruguay
- Coordinates: 34.7523°S 56.2288°W
- Type: Jewish cemetery

The Israelite Cemetery (Spanish: Cementerio Israelita de La Paz) is the only Jewish cemetery in Uruguay. It was established 28 November 1917. There are sections dedicated to Jews of different origins: Sephardim, Hungarian, German, Ashkenazim, etc.

In 2014, QR codes were being implemented for its tombstones, in order to enable web access to images and location data for every tomb there. It is claimed to be the first cemetery in the world to have introduced this innovation.

== See also ==
- History of the Jews in Uruguay
