= 2005 Uruguayan municipal elections =

Final results by department of the Uruguayan municipal elections, 2005. Broad Front National Party Colorado Party

Uruguay's local government elections, held on May 16, 2005, to elect the intendente of the 19 departments that are the administrative divisions of Uruguay, resulted in major gains for the newly elected Frente Amplio government, and heavy losses for the opposition Partido Nacional and Partido Colorado.

The Frente Amplio (left-wing) had won with an overwhelming margin the presidential and parliamentary elections on October 31, 2004, putting an end to the classic bipartisan competition and alternation in power of the Partido Colorado and the Partido Nacional (centre and centre right).

In the municipal elections of May 2000, the Partido Nacional had won 13 departments, the Partido Colorado five departments, and the Frente Amplio one department. As a result of the municipal elections of 2005, the Partido Nacional won 10 departments, the Frente Amplio eight, and the Partido Colorado one. The Frente Amplio had a net gain of seven departments, the Partido Colorado had a net loss of four departments and the Partido Nacional had a net loss of three departments.

== Results ==
| Party | Votes | % |
|---|---|---|
| Broad Front– Progressive Encounter–New Majority | 1,043,967 | 50.44 |
| National Party | 643,020 | 31.06 |
| Colorado Party | 360,944 | 17.44 |
| Independent Party | 19,568 | 0.95 |
| Other parties | 2,420 | 0.12 |
| Total | 2,069,919 | 100.00 |
Source: Corte Electoral

== List of winning candidates for intendente ==
Following is a list of the departments in Uruguay, with the name of the intendente elected, his party affiliation and the faction within the party to which he belongs:

- Montevideo: Ricardo Ehrlich (Frente Amplio, Movimiento de Participación Popular). Hold for the Frente Amplio.
- Artigas: Julio Silveira (Partido Nacional, Herrerismo). Pickup for the Partido Nacional from the Partido Colorado.
- Canelones: Marcos Carámbula (Frente Amplio, Alianza Progresista). Pickup for the Frente Amplio from the Partido Colorado.
- Cerro Largo: Ambrosio Barreiro (Partido Nacional, Herrerismo). Re-elected incumbent. Hold for the Partido Nacional.
- Colonia: Walter Zimmer (Partido Nacional, Alianza Nacional). Hold for the Partido Nacional.
- Durazno: Carmelo Vidalín (Partido Nacional, Herrerismo). Re-elected incumbent. Hold for the Partido Nacional.
- Flores: Walter Echeverría (Partido Nacional, Alianza Nacional); he died shortly before taking office, in his place came Armando Castaingdebat. Hold for the Partido Nacional.
- Florida: Juan Giachetto (Frente Amplio, Partido Socialista). Pickup for the Frente Amplio from the Partido Nacional.
- Lavalleja: Hermán Vergara (Partido Nacional, Correntada Wilsonista). Re-elected incumbent. Hold for the Partido Nacional.
- Maldonado: Oscar de los Santos (Frente Amplio, Alianza Progresista). Pickup for the Frente Amplio from the Partido Nacional.
- Paysandú: Julio Pintos (Frente Amplio, Partido Socialista). Pickup for the Frente Amplio from the Partido Nacional.
- Río Negro: Omar Lafluf (Partido Nacional, Alianza Nacional). Pickup for the Partido Nacional from the Partido Colorado.
- Rivera: Tabaré Viera (Partido Colorado), Foro Batllista). Re-elected incumbent. Hold for the Partido Colorado.
- Rocha: Artigas Barrios (Frente Amplio, Partido Socialista). Pickup for the Frente Amplio from the Partido Nacional.
- Salto: Ramón Fonticiella (Frente Amplio, Alianza Progresista). Pickup for the Frente Amplio from the Partido Colorado.
- San José: Juan Antonio Chiruchi (Partido Nacional, Herrerismo). Re-elected incumbent. Hold for the Partido Nacional.
- Soriano: Guillermo Besozzi (Partido Nacional, Alianza Nacional). Hold for the Partido Nacional.
- Tacuarembó: Wilson Ezquerra (Partido Nacional, Alianza Nacional). Hold for the Partido Nacional.
- Treinta y Tres: Gerardo Amaral (Frente Amplio, Partido Socialista). Pickup for the Frente Amplio from the Partido Nacional.
