= Electoral Court of Uruguay =

Electoral court

- Corte Electoral de Uruguay

Election commission overview
- Formed: January 9, 1924; 102 years ago
- Jurisdiction: Uruguay
- Headquarters: Montevideo
- Election commission executives: José Arocena, President; Wilfredo Penco, Vicepresident
- Website: www.corteelectoral.gub.uy

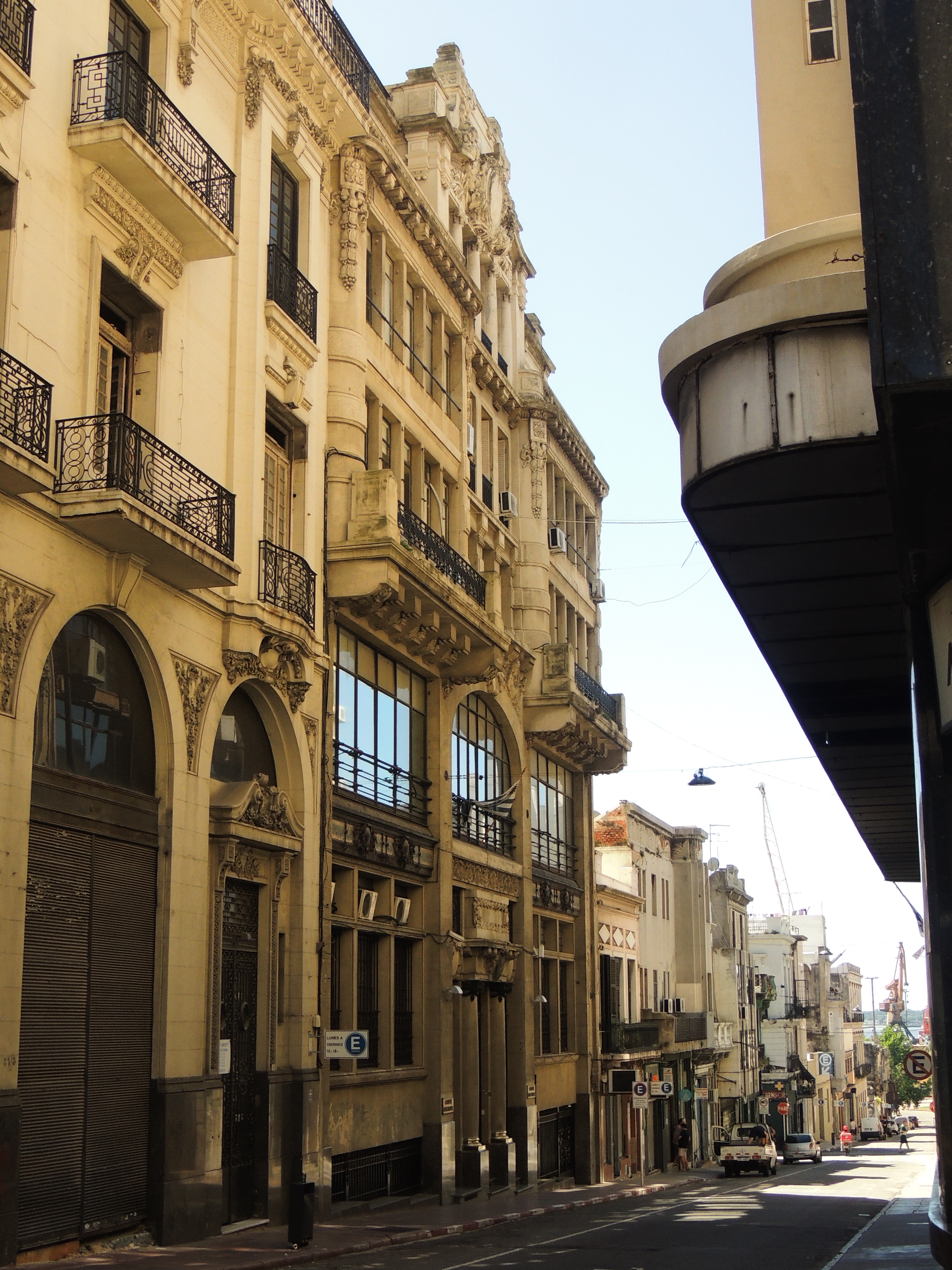
Headquarters of the Electoral Court in Ciudad Vieja, Montevideo.

The Electoral Court of Uruguay (Spanish: Corte Electoral de Uruguay) is the autonomous body which oversees the implementation of electioneering process, such as elections, referendums on laws and constitutional plebiscites in the Oriental Republic of Uruguay.

Based in Ciudad Vieja, Montevideo, it was created on January 9, 1924. Section XVIII of the Constitution of the Republic regulates the Electoral Justice of the country, and according to Article 322 to the Electoral Court is assigned to act in all matters relating to electoral acts or procedures; to exercise directive, disciplinary, advisory, and economic supervision over electoral organs; and to render final decision on all appeals and claims that may arise and act as judge of the elections to all elective offices, and of plebiscites and referendum.

There are other institutions whose elections are controlled by the Electoral Court, such as the University of the Republic the National Teachers Assemblies or the Social Security Bank.

== Membership ==
The Electoral Court is made up of nine ministers appointed by the General Assembly. Five of them by two thirds of votes of the total of its components, must be citizens who, due to their position in the political scene, are a guarantee of impartiality. The remaining four —representatives of the political parties— by double simultaneous vote according to the proportional representation system. According to Article 235 of the Constitution, members of the Electoral Court cannot be candidates for any position designated by the electorate, unless they resign and cease their functions at least six months before the election.

=== Current members ===
The Electoral Court is composed of nine Ministers:

- José Arocena — President (Independent)
- Wilfredo Penco — Vicepresident (Broad Front)
- Pablo Klappenbach (Broad Front)
- Cristina Arena (Broad Front)
- Arturo Silvera (National Party)
- Ana Lía Piñeyrúa (National Party)
- José Garchitorena (Colorado Party)
- Juan Maspoli (Colorado Party)
