= 2015 Uruguayan municipal elections =

Local election

- 10 May 2015
- Winning party by department National Party Broad Front Colorado Party

Uruguay held local government elections on May 10, 2015, electing the intendente of the 19 departments that are the administrative divisions of Uruguay, as well as 112 local governments.

This was the second time that both intendentes and alcaldes were elected simultaneously.

== Election by Department ==
In the municipal elections of May 2010, the Partido Nacional (National Party) had won 12 departments, the Partido Colorado (Colorado Party) two departments, and the Frente Amplio (Broad Front) five departments.

=== Canelones ===
A former stronghold of the Colorado Party, Canelones has been held by the Broad Front coalition since 2005, and once again this party was the winner:

- Yamandú Orsi (winner)
- José Carlos Mahía

=== Montevideo ===
In the Montevideo, Uruguay's capital, the National and Colorado Parties ran as a common list. The candidates were as follows:

- Jorge Gandini
- Ney Castillo
- Edgardo Novick
- Álvaro Garcé
- Ricardo Rachetti

Broad Front held the seat:

- Daniel Martínez (winner)
- Lucía Topolansky

== See also ==
- 2014 Uruguayan general election
- Electoral calendar
- Electoral system
- Ley de lemas
- 2020 Uruguayan municipal elections
- 2015 in Uruguay
