= List of ministers of livestock, agriculture, and fisheries (Uruguay) =

Ministerio de Ganadería, Agricultura y Pesca (MGAP)

List of ministers of livestock, agriculture, and fisheries of Uruguay:

Minister	Party	Period
Arturo González Vidart	National Independent Party	1943–1945
Gustavo Gallinal	National Independent Party	1946
Aquiles Espalter	Colorado Party (Uruguay)	1947
Luis Alberto Brause	Colorado Party (Uruguay)	1948–1949
Carlos L. Fischer	Colorado Party (Uruguay)	1950
Luis Alberto Brause	Colorado Party (Uruguay)	1951
Juan T. Quilici	Colorado Party (Uruguay)	1952–1954
Ramón F. Bado	Colorado Party (Uruguay)	1955
Amílcar Vasconcellos	Colorado Party (Uruguay)	1955–1957
Joaquín Aparicio	Colorado Party (Uruguay)	1957–1959
Carlos V. Puig	National Party (Uruguay)	1959–1963
Wilson Ferreira Aldunate	National Party (Uruguay)	1963–1967
Manuel Flores Mora	Colorado Party (Uruguay)	1967–1968
Carlos Frick Davie	Colorado Party (Uruguay)	1968–1969
Jaime Montaner	Colorado Party (Uruguay)	1969
Juan María Bordaberry	Colorado Party (Uruguay)	1969–1972
Héctor Viana Martorell	Colorado Party (Uruguay)	1972
Benito Medero	National Party (Uruguay)	1972–1974
Héctor Alburquerque¹	Without known affiliation	1974–1975
Julio Eduardo Aznárez¹	Without known affiliation	1975–1976
Luis Heriberto Meyer¹	Without known affiliation	1976–1977
Estanislao Valdés Otero¹	National Party (Uruguay)	1977–1978
Luis Heriberto Meyer¹	Without known affiliation	1978
Jorge León Otero¹	Without known affiliation	1978–1979
Juan Cassou¹	Without known affiliation	1979–1981
Félix Zubillaga¹	Without known affiliation	1981
Francisco Tourreilles¹	Without known affiliation	1981
Carlos Mattos Moglia¹	Without known affiliation	1981–1985
Roberto Vázquez Platero	Colorado Party (Uruguay)	1985–1986
Pedro Bonino Garmendia	Colorado Party (Uruguay)	1986–1990
Álvaro Ramos Trigo	National Party (Uruguay)	1990–1993
Pedro Saravia Fratti	National Party (Uruguay)	1993–1994
Gonzalo Cibils	National Party (Uruguay)	1994–1995
Carlos Gasparri	Colorado Party (Uruguay)	1995–1998
Sergio Chiesa	Colorado Party (Uruguay)	1998–1999
Ignacio Zorrilla de San Martín	Colorado Party (Uruguay)	1999
Luis Brezzo	Colorado Party (Uruguay)	1999–2000
Juan Notaro	Colorado Party (Uruguay)	2000
Gonzalo González Fernández	National Party (Uruguay)	2000–2003
Martín Aguirrezabala	Colorado Party (Uruguay)	2003–2005
José Mujica	Broad Front (Uruguay)	2005–2008
Ernesto Agazzi	Broad Front (Uruguay)	2008–2009
Andrés Berterreche	Broad Front (Uruguay)	2009–2010
Tabaré Aguerre	Broad Front (Uruguay)	2010-Incumbent

¹ Ministers of the Military-Civic government (1973–1985).
