= 2004 Uruguayan presidential primaries =

Presidential primary elections were held in Uruguay on 27 June 2004 in order to nominate the presidential candidate for every political party taking part in the 2004 Uruguayan general election.

== Background ==
The formally called elecciones internas (Spanish for 'Internal elections') are the first stage of the electoral system established by the Constitution of 1997. In this election, the only candidates for President of Uruguay per party for the general election will be elected. In addition, the integration of the National Deliberative Body and the different Departmental Deliberative Bodies of the different parties, which have the function of nominating the candidate for president and vice president of each party, and the candidates for mayors for the municipal elections of 2005 are also elected.

In accordance with the transitory provisions of the Constitution, the primary elections are held on the last Sunday of June of the electoral year, and those "qualified to vote"—all those over 18 years of age and registered in the Civic Registry and with a civic credential―can participate in the secret and non-compulsory suffrage.

In order to win the primary election and be proclaimed a presidential candidate, the pre-candidate must obtain an absolute majority of the party's valid votes. In the event that no pre-candidate obtains that majority, the winner will be the one that exceeds 40% of the votes and leads the second by no less than 10 percentage points. If none of these circumstances occur, the deliberative body elected in the election will nominate the party's candidate for president by an absolute majority of its members.

The participation of the parties in the elections is mandatory. In addition, each one had to obtain at least 500 votes to participate in the general elections.

== Primaries ==
Most parties had only one candidate running unopposed, including Tabaré Vázquez of Broad Front–Progressive Encounter–New Majority; Pablo Mieres of the Independent Party; Victor Lissindi of the Intrasigent Party; Aldo Lamorte of the Civic Union; and Rafael Fernández of the Workers' Party. Jorge Larrañaga, Luis Alberto Lacalle, and Cristina Maeso competed to represent the National Party, with Larrañaga claiming the role. Guillermo Stirling defeated Alberto Iglesias, Ricardo Lombardo, Manuel Flores Silva, Eisenhower Cardoso, Jorge Ruiz, and Gustavo Boquete to represent the Colorado Party. Julio Vera was chosen to represent the Liberal Party over Ramón Díaz and José Curotto.
