= Mónica Bottero =

Uruguayan journalist, writer and politician

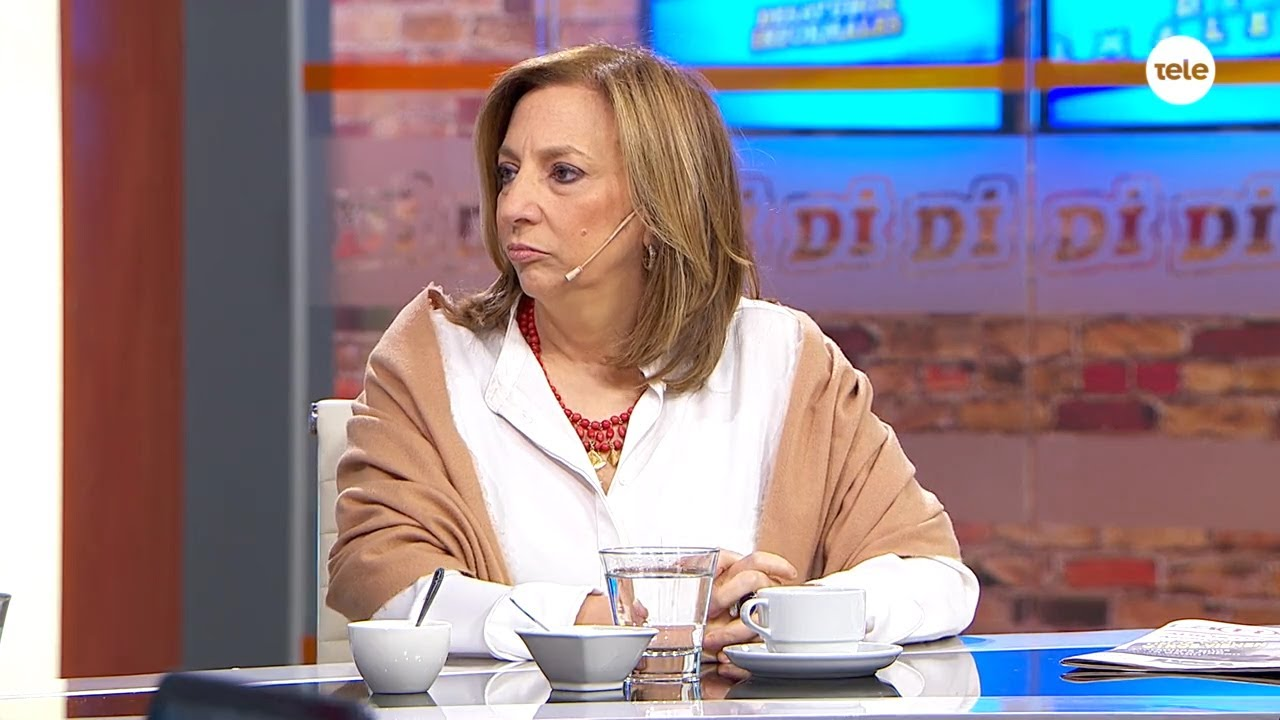
- Bottero in 2019.

Personal details
- Born: Mónica Bottero Tovagliare; 1964 (age 61–62) Montevideo, Uruguay
- Party: Independent Party
- Occupation: Journalist, civil servant, politician
- Awards: Premio Alas; Premio Legión del Libro

Mónica Bottero Tovagliare (born 1964) is a Uruguayan journalist, writer and politician from the Independent Party (PI).

== Career ==
Bottero has been a journalist since 1982, when she joined the editorial office of El Día. She was part of the founding staff of the weekly newspaper Brecha, and worked as a parliamentary chronicler and editor of special reports on national politics, as well as a correspondent in Central America. As a journalist for the politics section of El Día, she covered the events of the democratic transition in 1985. Years later she moved to Cuba to take a UNESCO course. In 1988, when she returned to Uruguay, she began working at Búsqueda, until 2017. From 2010 to 2017 she served as Editor-in-Chief of magazine Gallery of the weekly Búsqueda. From 2017 to 2018, she was a panelist on the debate program Todos las Voces aired on Channel 4. She has served as a reporter for the Cuban agency Prensa Latina and a reference journalist for The New York Times.

== Political career ==
At the beginning of 2019, Bottero joined the Independent Party as head of the communication division. She was officially presented by the party leader, Pablo Mieres, on February 26 in the annex of the Legislative Palace. In June, facing the presidential primaries, she begins as a political leader with an accusatory speech against political outsiders. On July 13, Mieres announced Bottero as his running mate. She declared that she knew and did not want to deny that her place in the formula was due to her gender, stating "I do not want to deny it, much less be ashamed of being a product of the quota".

In the general election, the Mieres-Bottero formula obtained 0.97 percent of the vote. For the second round of the election, the Independent Party supported the Luis Lacalle Pou-Beatriz Argimón formula as part of the Coalición Multicolor. After Lacalle Pou's victory, she was appointed director of the National Institute for Women of the Ministry of Social Development.

== Works ==
- 1988: Mujeres (veintiséis retratos de uruguayas)
- 1992: Montevideo de puño y letra (Fin de siglo, collaborator)
- 1997: Mujeres uruguayas I (colaboradora, ISBN 9974-671-08-6)
- 2001: Mujeres uruguayas II (colaboradora)
- 2000: Grandes entrevistas uruguayas (collaborator, compiled by César di Candia)
- 2005: Diosas y brujas (Fin de Siglo)
- 2006: Pongámoslo así (Fin de Siglo)
- 2009: Madres al límite, cinco historias reales de maternidad uruguaya
