= Sergio Abreu (politician) =

Uruguayan politician (born 1945)

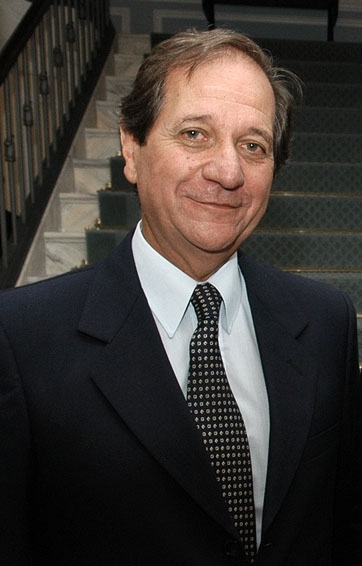

Senator of Uruguay
- Incumbent
- Assumed office March 1, 2020
- In office February 15, 2005 – February 15, 2015

Minister of Industry, Energy and Mining of Uruguay
- In office March 1, 2000 – November 13, 2002
- President: Jorge Batlle
- Preceded by: Primavera Garbarino
- Succeeded by: Pedro Bordaberry

Minister of Foreign Affairs of Uruguay
- In office January 4, 1993 – March 1, 1995
- President: Luis Alberto Lacalle
- Preceded by: Héctor Gros Espiell
- Succeeded by: Álvaro Ramos Trigo

Personal details
- Born: Sergio Abreu Bonilla; 12 November 1945 (age 80) Montevideo, Uruguay
- Party: National Party
- Education: University of the Republic
- Occupation: Politician
- Profession: Lawyer

Sergio Abreu Bonilla (born 12 November 1945) is a Uruguayan lawyer, diplomat, politician, musician and professor of International Law of the National Party (PN). Since February 15, 2020, he has served as Senator of the Republic.

He served as Minister of Foreign Relations (1993-1995) and as Minister of Industry, Energy and Mining (2002-2002).

== Biography ==
=== Early life and education ===
Son of a Paraguayan citizen who settled in Uruguay, Sergio Abreu graduated as a lawyer at the University of the Republic in 1974, and completed postgraduate courses outside the country at USC (1977), University of Texas (1980) and The Hague (1983).

=== Political career ===
He served as the Director of Administration and Finance of LAIA between 1979 and 1989.

In the 1989 elections, in which the National Party (headed by Luis Alberto Lacalle) won the presidency, Abreu was elected Senator of the Republic for the sector of Renovation and Victory. In January 1993, he was appointed by Lacalle as Minister of Foreign Relations, a position he held until the end of the period.

In 1999 the non herreristas party elected him to complete the presidential ticket headed by Lacalle, who had won the internal elections of April of that year.

In March 2000, the new president Jorge Batlle appointed Abreu as the Minister of Industry, Energy and Mining. He held this post until November 2002, the National Party decided to withdraw from the Cabinet. Then resigned the portfolio he held.

In the 2004 election, he cast a pre-candidacy for the Presidency; but soon after, he decides to support Jorge Larrañaga, who is elected sole candidate for the National Party, and again the Party Convention elects Sergio Abreu as candidate for the Vice-presidency. Abreu was elected senator for the Alianza Nacional sector, a seat he assumed in February 2005.

He supported Jorge Larrañaga's candidacy for the presidency of the Republic in the 2009 presidential primaries. In the general election, he ran again for the Senate, being reelected for the 48th Legislature.

He was nominated for the 2014 presidential primaries. However, on April 7, 2014, he lowered his candidacy to support Luis Lacalle Pou.

In the 2019 general election he was reelected Senator of the Republic, for the 49th Legislature.

=== Artistic activity ===
In January 2011, he released the CD Kuñakarai ("lady" in the Guaraní language) with themes of folkloric style.
