= 2009 Uruguayan presidential primaries =

Presidential primary elections were held in Uruguay on 28 June 2009 in order to nominate the presidential candidate for every political party taking part in the 2009 Uruguayan general election.

== Background ==
The formally called elecciones internas (Spanish for 'Internal elections') are the first stage of the electoral system established by the Constitution of 1997. In this election, the only candidates for President of Uruguay per party for the general election will be elected. In addition, the integration of the National Deliberative Body and the different Departmental Deliberative Bodies of the different parties, which have the function of nominating the candidate for president and vice president of each party, and the candidates for mayors for the municipal elections of 2010 are also elected.

In accordance with the transitory provisions of the Constitution, the primary elections are held on the last Sunday of June of the electoral year, and those "qualified to vote"—all those over 18 years of age and registered in the Civic Registry and with a civic credential―can participate in the secret and non-compulsory suffrage.

In order to win the primary election and be proclaimed a presidential candidate, the pre-candidate must obtain an absolute majority of the party's valid votes. In the event that no pre-candidate obtains that majority, the winner will be the one that exceeds 40% of the votes and leads the second by no less than 10 percentage points. If none of these circumstances occur, the deliberative body elected in the election will nominate the party's candidate for president by an absolute majority of its members.

The participation of the parties in the elections is mandatory. In addition, each one had to obtain at least 500 votes to participate in the general elections.

== Primaries ==
The presidential primary elections were held on 28 June 2009 to nominate a candidate for each party. José Mujica became the Broad Front's candidate, winning over Danilo Astori and Marcos Carámbula. The National Party chose Luis Alberto Lacalle over Jorge Larrañaga and Irineu Riet Correa. Pedro Bordaberry won the Colorado Party candidacy, beating out José Amorín, Luis Antonio Hierro López, and Daniel Lamas. Pablo Mieres (Independent Party) and Raúl Rodríguez (Popular Assembly) ran unopposed. Not all contenders were members of the party they sought to represent.
