= 2004 Uruguayan general election =

← 1999	31 October 2004	2009 →
- Registered: 2,488,004
- Turnout: 89.62% (▼2.17pp)
- Presidential election
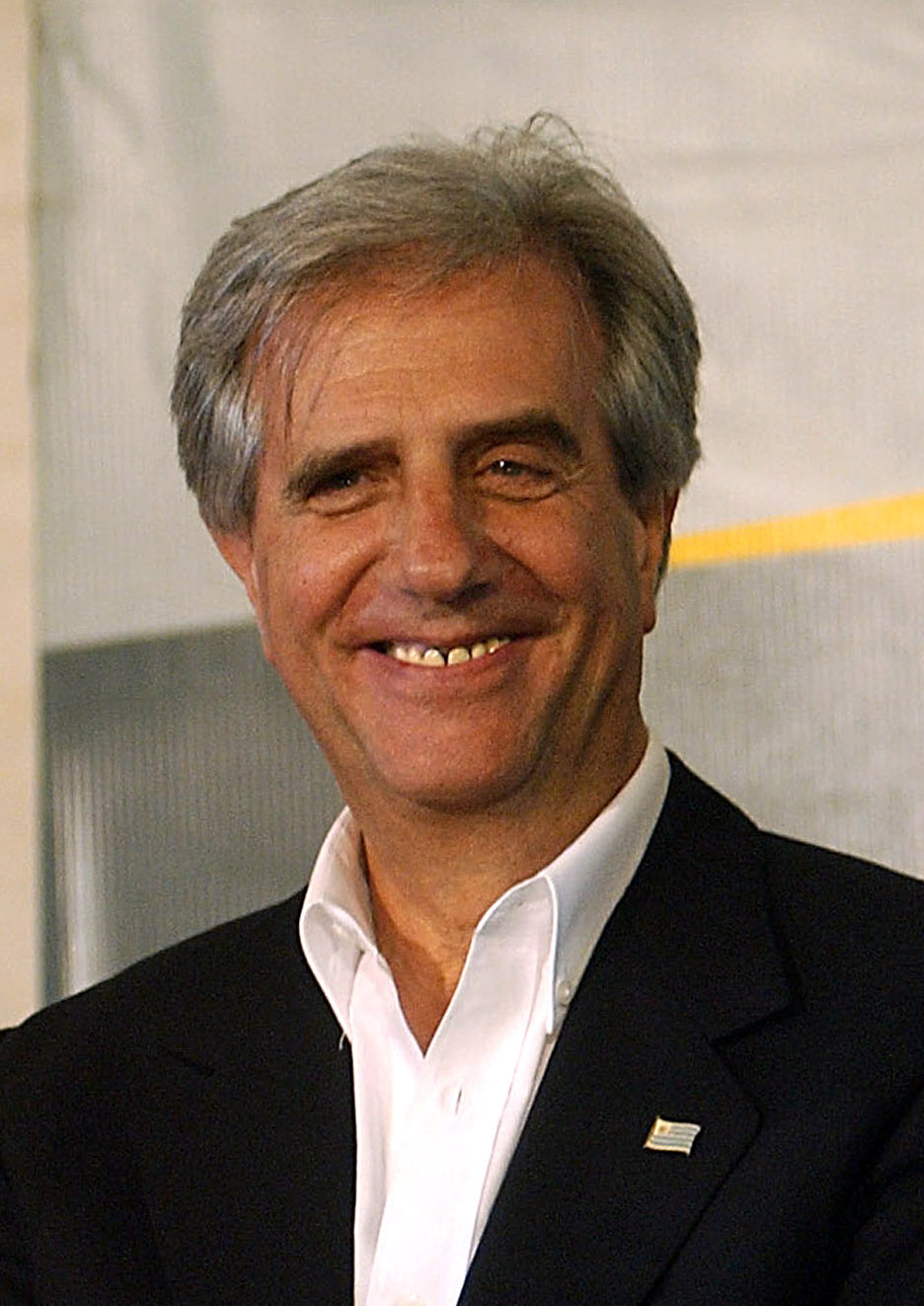

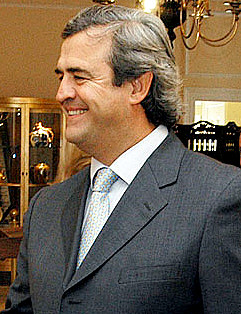

Nominee	Tabaré Vázquez	Jorge Larrañaga	Guillermo Stirling
Party	Socialist	National	Colorado
Alliance	Broad Front
Running mate	Rodolfo Nin	Sergio Abreu	Tabaré Viera
Popular vote	1,124,761	764,739	231,036
Percentage	51.68%	35.13%	10.61%
President before election
Jorge Batlle
Colorado
Elected President
Tabaré Vázquez
Broad Front
- Parliamentary election
Party	Leader	Vote %	Seats	+/–
Chamber
Broad Front	Tabaré Vázquez	51.68	52	+12
National	Jorge Larrañaga	35.13	36	+14
Colorado	Guillermo Stirling	10.61	10	−23
Independent	Pablo Mieres	1.88	1	New
Senate
Broad Front	Tabaré Vázquez	51.68	16	+4
National	Jorge Larrañaga	35.13	11	+4
Colorado	Guillermo Stirling	10.61	3	−7
This lists parties that won seats. See the complete results below.
- Maps

General elections were held in Uruguay on 31 October 2004, alongside a constitutional referendum. The result was a victory for the Broad Front, marking the first time a party other than the Colorado Party or National Party had held power since the two parties were formed in the 1830s.

Broad Front leader Tabaré Vázquez was elected president on his third attempt after his party won just over 50% of the vote, enough for him to win the presidency in a single round. To date, this is the only time that a presidential election has been decided without a runoff since the two-round system was introduced in 1999. The Broad Front also won majorities in the Chamber of Deputies and the Senate.

== Presidential candidates ==
The Uruguayan presidential primaries were held on 27 June 2004, to choose single candidates for every party.

Party	Candidate	Ideology	Previous result	
Party	Candidate	Ideology	Votes (%)	Seats
Broad Front–Progressive Encounter–New Majority	Tabaré Vázquez	Democratic socialism Social democracy	44.67%	44 / 99 13 / 30
National Party	Jorge Larrañaga	Conservatism Christian democracy	22.31%	22 / 99 7 / 30
Colorado Party	Guillermo Stirling	Liberalism	32.78%	33 / 99 10 / 30
Independent Party	Pablo Mieres	Social democracy Christian democracy	New party	

== Results ==
Party	Presidential candidate	Votes	%	Seats			
Party	Presidential candidate	Votes	%	Chamber	+/–	Senate	+/–
Broad Front–Progressive Encounter	Tabaré Vázquez	1,124,761	51.66	52	+12	16	+4
National Party	Jorge Larrañaga	764,739	35.13	36	+14	11	+4
Colorado Party	Guillermo Stirling	231,036	10.61	10	–23	3	–7
Independent Party	Pablo Mieres	41,011	1.88	1	New	0	New
Intransigent Party	Victor Lissidini	8,572	0.39	0	New	0	New
Civic Union	Aldo Lamorte	4,859	0.22	0	New	0	0
Liberal Party	Julio Vera	1,548	0.07	0	New	0	New
Workers' Party	Rafael Fernández	513	0.02	0	New	0	New
Total		2,177,039	100.00	99	0	30	0
Valid votes		2,177,039	97.64				
Invalid/blank votes		52,572	2.36				
Total votes		2,229,611	100.00				
Registered voters/turnout		2,487,816	89.62				
Source: Corte Electoral

=== By department ===
Results
Constituency	Broad Front			National Party			Colorado Party			Independent Party			Others (Note: Parties which gained no parliamentary representation: Intransigent Party, Civic Union, Liberal Party, Workers' Party.)		Valid votes		Invalid votes	
Constituency	Votes	%	D	Votes	%	D	Votes	%	D	Votes	%	D	Votes	%	Votes	%	Votes	%
Artigas	16,220	32.1	1	24,517	48.5	1	8,563	16.9	0	153	0.3	0	49	0.10	49,502	97.8	1,090	2.2
Canelones	161,879	53.2	7	98,844	32.5	5	28,044	9.2	2	5,176	1.7	0	2,451	0.81	296,394	97.4	8,036	2.6
Cerro Largo	23,111	38.0	1	29,129	47.9	1	6,700	11.0	0	291	0.5	0	9	0.01	59,240	97.5	1,509	2.5
Colonia	36,677	41.4	1	37,302	42.1	1	10,136	11.4	1	1,527	1.7	0	641	0.72	86,283	97.4	2,298	2.6
Durazno	13,524	33.1	1	19,456	47.7	1	6,117	15.0	0	466	1.1	0	317	0.78	39,880	97.7	950	2.3
Flores	6,049	31.7	1	9,567	50.2	1	2,796	14.7	0	183	1.0	0	36	0.19	18,631	97.8	427	2.2
Florida	21,042	41.3	1	20,495	40.2	1	7,413	14.5	0	678	1.3	0	261	0.51	49,889	97.8	1,115	2.2
Lavalleja	14,612	31.7	1	22,122	48.1	1	7,189	15.6	0	761	1.7	0	111	0.24	44,795	97.3	1,243	2.7
Maldonado	46,945	47.8	2	36,218	36.9	2	9,278	9.4	0	2,620	2.7	0	553	0.56	95,614	97.4	2,568	2.6
Montevideo	565,974	61.3	27	226,552	24.6	11	76,099	8.2	3	24,933	2.7	1	9,545	1.03	903,103	97.9	19,672	2.1
Paysandú	35,053	45.3	1	35,357	45.7	1	4,720	6.1	0	472	0.6	0	45	0.06	75,647	97.7	1,805	2.3
Rio Negro	14,240	39.7	1	15,558	43.4	1	4,926	13.7	0	235	0.7	0	106	0.30	35,065	97.8	780	2.2
Rivera	21,300	30.0	1	32,006	45.1	1	15,419	21.7	1	347	0.5	0	199	0.28	69,271	97.7	1,663	2.3
Rocha	22,879	43.8	1	20,196	38.7	1	6,534	12.5	0	553	1.1	0	240	0.46	50,402	96.6	1,775	3.4
Salto	35,359	43.4	1	31,823	39.1	1	11,610	14.3	1	479	0.6	0	214	0.26	79,485	97.6	1,927	2.4
San Jose	29,277	42.8	1	29,663	43.4	1	6,683	9.8	1	799	1.2	0	319	0.47	66,741	97.6	1,671	2.4
Soriano	26,332	43.1	1	25,617	41.9	1	7,015	11.5	0	574	0.9	0	58	0.09	59,596	97.5	1,546	2.5
Tacuarembó	21,241	32.6	1	33,931	52.0	1	7,887	12.1	1	373	0.6	0	289	0.44	63,721	97.7	1,470	2.3
Treinta y Tres	13,047	37.5	1	16,386	47.1	1	3,907	11.2	0	391	1.1	0	49	0.14	33,780	97.0	1,027	3.0
Total	1,124,761	50.45	52	764,739	34.30	36	231,036	10.36	10	41,011	1.84	1	15,492	0.69	2,177,039	97.64	52,572	2.36
Source: Corte Electoral
