= José Mujica =

President of Uruguay from 2010 to 2015

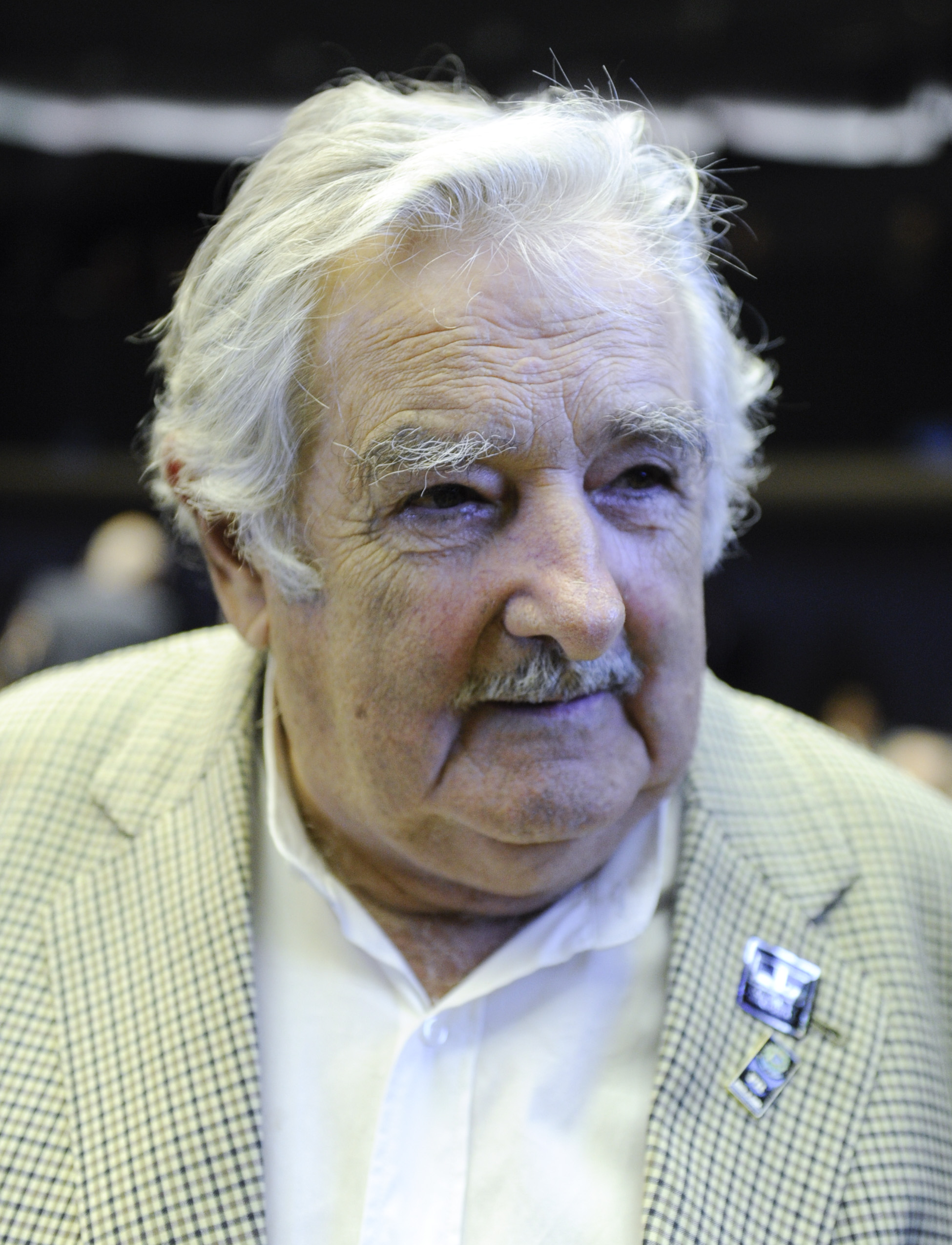
- Mujica in 2015

40th President of Uruguay
- In office 1 March 2010 – 1 March 2015
- Vice President: Danilo Astori
- Preceded by: Tabaré Vázquez
- Succeeded by: Tabaré Vázquez
Other offices held 1995–2020
President pro tempore of UNASUR
In role 4 December 2014 – 1 March 2015
Preceded by	Dési Bouterse
Succeeded by	Tabaré Vázquez
Minister of Livestock, Agriculture and Fisheries
In office 1 March 2005 – 3 March 2008
President	Tabaré Vázquez
Preceded by	Martín Aguirrezabala
Succeeded by	Ernesto Agazzi
Senator of Uruguay
In office 15 February 2020 – 20 October 2020
In office 1 March 2015 – 14 August 2018
In office 15 February 2000 – 1 March 2005
National Representative
In office 15 February 1995 – 15 February 2000
Constituency	Montevideo
Second Gentleman of Uruguay
In role 13 September 2017 – 1 March 2020
Vice President	Lucía Topolansky
Preceded by	María Belén Bordone Faedo
Succeeded by	Jorge Fernández Reyes

Personal details
- Born: José Alberto Mujica Cordano; 20 May 1935 Montevideo, Uruguay
- Died: 13 May 2025 (aged 89) Montevideo, Uruguay
- Resting place: Mujica farmhouse, Rincón del Cerro, Montevideo
- Party: Movement of Popular Participation (from 1989)
- Other political affiliations: Broad Front; Tupamaros (1966–1972)
- Spouse: Lucía Topolansky (m. 2005)
- Occupation: Politician; farmer

José Alberto "Pepe" Mujica Cordano (Note: In this Spanish name, the first or paternal surname is Mujica and the second or maternal family name is Cordano.) (Note: Spanish pronunciation: [xoˈse alˈβeɾto muˈxika koɾˈðano]; nickname pronounced [ˈpepe].) (20 May 1935 – 13 May 2025) was a Uruguayan politician, revolutionary and farmer who served as the 40th president of Uruguay from 2010 to 2015. A former guerrilla with the Tupamaros, he was tortured and imprisoned for 14 years during the military dictatorship in the 1970s and 1980s. A member of the Broad Front coalition of left-wing parties, Mujica was the minister of Livestock, Agriculture, and Fisheries from 2005 to 2008 and a senator afterwards. As the candidate of the Broad Front, he won the 2009 presidential election and took office as president on 1 March 2010.

Mujica's administration implemented a range of progressive policies, including the decriminalization of abortion, the legalization of marijuana consumption and the legalization of same-sex marriage. Additional measures strengthened the country's trade unions and significantly bolstered minimum wages.

While in office, Mujica was described as being "the world's poorest president" due to his austere lifestyle and his donation of around 90 percent of his US$12,000 monthly salary to charities that support low-income individuals and small entrepreneurs. He was an outspoken critic of capitalism and characterised it as having a focus on stockpiling material possessions which do not contribute to human happiness.

== Early life and education ==
José Alberto Mujica Cordano was born on 20 May 1935 in the Paso de la Arena neighbourhood of Montevideo to Demetrio Mujica Terra and Lucy Cordano Giorello. Demetrio was a descendant of a Spanish Basque family who arrived in Uruguay in 1842. Through his paternal grandmother, Mujica is a distant relative of several prominent Uruguayan politicians, including Gabriel Terra, who served as the country's 26th president between 1931 and 1938. Demetrio's parents owned several agricultural properties, which were used as training grounds for soldiers to combat the uprisings led by revolutionary leader Aparicio Saravia. A farmer by profession, Demetrio went bankrupt shortly before his death in 1940 when José was five years old. Lucy was born in Carmelo to impoverished Italian immigrants from Liguria, with origins in the municipality of Favale di Malvaro in the former province of Genoa. After she was born, her parents had bought 2 hectares (4.9 acres) in Colonia Estrella, a small town in the Colonia Department, to cultivate vineyards. Her father was an active member of the National Party and a follower of Herrerism, and he was selected on several occasions as an alderman for Colonia and became closely acquainted with Luis Alberto de Herrera.

After completing his primary and secondary studies, Mujica enrolled at the Alfredo Vásquez Acevedo Institute for his undergraduate studies, but did not finish. From 13 to 17, he was a cycler for several clubs in different categories.

Mujica's maternal uncle, Ángel Cordano, was a member of the National Party and had a prominent influence on Mujica's political formation. In 1956, Mujica met politician Enrique Erro through his mother, who was a militant in the same sector. From that point on, Mujica began to actively support the National Party, eventually becoming its general secretary.

The National Party won most of the seats in the senate during the 1958 general election, upon which Erro was appointed Minister of Labor, serving from 1959 to 1960, with Mujica accompanying him, although he did not become an official in the ministry. In 1962, both Erro and Mujica left the National Party to create the Unión Popular, a left-wing party, in collaboration with the Socialist Party. In the 1962 election, they nominated Emilio Frugoni as their candidate for president, but lost decisively receiving only 2.3% of the total votes.

== Guerrilla ==
In the mid-1960s, Mujica joined the newly formed MLN-Tupamaros movement, a far-left armed political group inspired by the Cuban Revolution. He participated in the brief 1969 taking of Pando, a town close to Montevideo, leading one of six squads assaulting strategic points in the city. Mujica's team was charged with taking over the telephone exchange and was the only one to complete the operation without any mishaps. In March 1970 Mujica was seriously injured while resisting arrest at a Montevideo bar; he injured two policemen and was in turn shot six times. The surgeon on call at the hospital saved his life. Tupamaros claimed that the surgeon was secretly Tupamaro and that is why his life was saved. In reality the doctor was simply following ordinary medical ethics. At the time, the president of Uruguay was the controversial Jorge Pacheco Areco, who had suspended certain constitutional guarantees in response to MLN and Communist unrest.

Mujica was captured by the authorities four times. He was among the more than 100 Tupamaros who escaped Punta Carretas Prison in September 1971 by digging a tunnel from inside the prison that led to the living room of a nearby home. Mujica was re-captured less than a month after escaping, but escaped Punta Carretas once more in April 1972. On that occasion he and about a dozen other escapees fled riding improvised wheeled planks down the tunnel dug by Tupamaros from outside the prison. He was re-apprehended for the last time in 1972, unable to resist arrest. In the months that followed, the country underwent the military coup of 1973. In the meantime, Mujica and eight other Tupamaros were especially chosen to remain under military custody and in squalid conditions. In all, he spent 13 years in captivity. During the 1970s and 1980s, this included being confined to the bottom of an old, emptied horse-watering trough for more than two years. During his time in prison, Mujica had a number of health problems, particularly mental issues. Although his two closest cellmates, Eleuterio Fernández Huidobro and Mauricio Rosencof, often managed to communicate with each other, they rarely managed to bring Mujica into the conversation. According to Mujica himself, at the time he was experiencing auditory hallucinations and related forms of paranoia.

In 1985 after constitutional democracy was restored, Mujica was freed under an amnesty law that covered political and related military crimes committed since 1962. Several years after the restoration of democracy, Mujica and many Tupamaros joined other left-wing organizations to create the Movement of Popular Participation (MPP), a political party which was accepted within the Broad Front coalition.

== Early career and 2009 presidential campaign ==
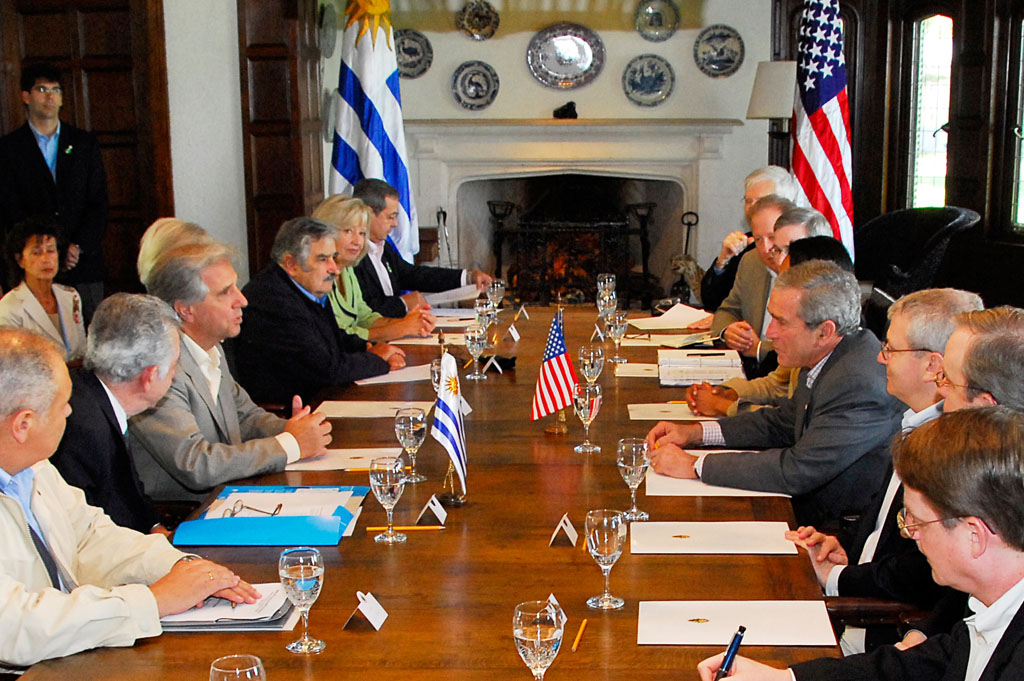
Minister Mujica (next to Tabaré Vázquez, left row) at a meeting with George W. Bush in 2007

In the 1994 general elections, Mujica was elected deputy and in the elections of 1999 he was elected senator. Due in part to Mujica's charisma, the MPP continued to grow in popularity and votes, and by 2004, it had become the largest faction within the Broad Front. In the elections of that year, Mujica was re-elected to the Senate, and the MPP obtained over 300,000 votes, thus consolidating its position as the top political force within the coalition and a major force behind the victory of presidential candidate Tabaré Vázquez. On 1 March 2005, Vázquez designated Mujica as the Minister of Livestock, Agriculture and Fisheries (Mujica's own professional background was in the agricultural sector). Upon becoming minister, Mujica resigned his position as senator. He held this position until a cabinet change in 2008, when he resigned and was replaced by Ernesto Agazzi. Mujica then returned to his seat in the Senate.

=== 2009 presidential campaign ===
Even though President Vázquez favored his Finance Minister Danilo Astori as the presidential candidate of the then-unified Broad Front to succeed him in 2010, Mujica's broad appeal and growing support within the party posed a challenge to the president. On 14 December 2008, a special party convention proclaimed Mujica as the official candidate of the Broad Front for the 2009 primary elections, but four more precandidates were allowed to participate, including Astori. On 28 June 2009, Mujica won the primary elections to become the presidential candidate of the Broad Front for the 2009 presidential election. After that, Astori agreed to be his running mate. Their campaign was centered on the concept of continuing and deepening the policies of the highly popular administration of Vázquez, using the slogan Un gobierno honrado, un país de primera ("An honorable government, a first-class country") – indirectly referencing cases of administrative corruption within the former government of the major opposition candidate, conservative Luis Alberto Lacalle. During the campaign, Mujica distanced himself from the governing style of presidents like Hugo Chávez of Venezuela or Evo Morales of Bolivia, claiming the center-left governments of Brazilian Luiz Inácio Lula da Silva or Chilean socialist Michelle Bachelet as regional examples upon which he would model his administration. Known for his informal style of dress, Mujica donned a suit (without a tie) for some stops in the presidential campaign, notably during visits to regional heads of state.

In October 2009, Mujica won a plurality of over 48 percent of the votes compared to 30 percent for former president Lacalle, falling short of the majority required by the constitution, while at the same time renewing the Broad Front's parliamentary majority for the next legislature (2010–2015). A runoff was then held on 29 November to determine the winner; on 30 November Mujica emerged as the victor, with more than 52% of the vote over Lacalle's 43%. In his first speech as president-elect before a crowd of supporters, Mujica acknowledged his political adversaries and called for unity, stating that there would be "no winners or losers". He added that "it is a mistake to think that power comes from above when it comes from within the hearts of the masses (...) it has taken me a lifetime to learn this fact".

== Presidency (2010–2015) ==
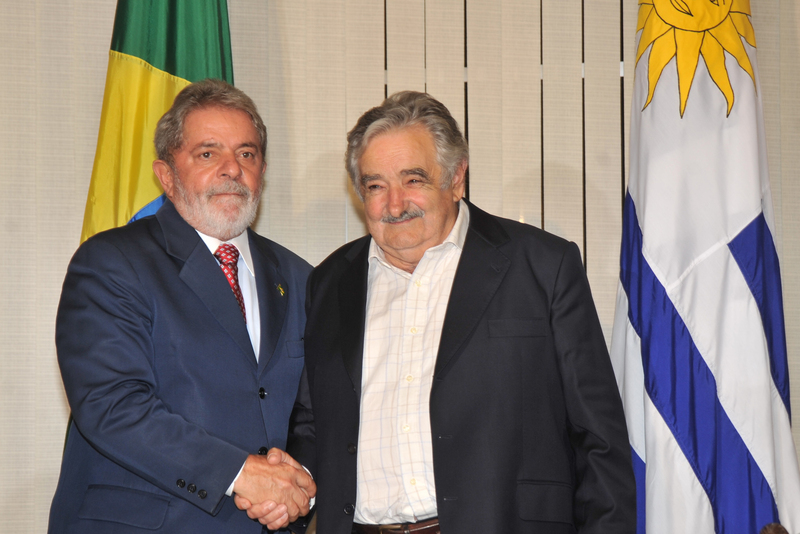
Mujica with Luiz Inácio Lula da Silva, in 2010

Mujica formed a cabinet made up of politicians from the different components of the Broad Front, ceding the area of economics to aides of his vice president Danilo Astori.

In June 2012, Mujica's government made a controversial move to legalize state-controlled sales of marijuana in Uruguay in order to fight drug-related crimes and health issues, and stated that global leaders would be asked to do the same. Mujica said that by regulating Uruguay's estimated US$40 million-a-year marijuana business, the state would take it away from drug traffickers and weaken the drug cartels. The state would also be able to keep track of all marijuana consumers in the country and provide treatment to the most serious abusers, much like the treatment afforded to alcoholics. Mujica also passed a same-sex marriage law and legalized abortion.

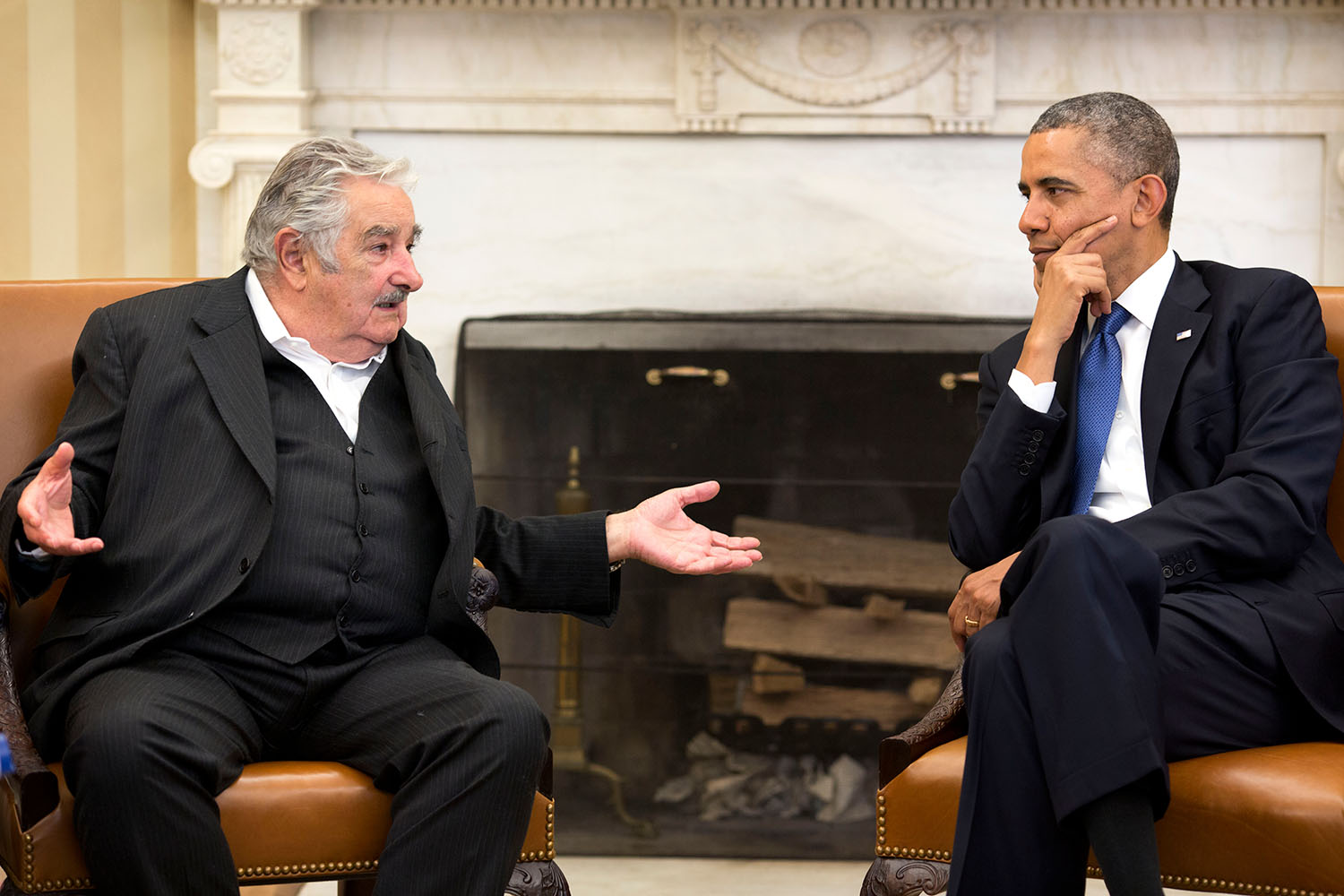
Mujica with Barack Obama in the Oval Office in 2014

In September 2013, Mujica addressed the United Nations General Assembly's 68th session, with a long speech devoted to humanity and globalization. The speech called on the international community to strengthen efforts to preserve the planet for future generations and highlighted the power of the financial systems and the impact of economic fallout on ordinary people. He urged a return to simplicity, with lives founded on human relationships, love, friendship, adventure, solidarity and family, instead of lives shackled to the economy and the markets.

Mujica's policies were generally in line with the previous administration. The share of social expenditure in total public expenditure rose from 60.9% to 75.5% between 2004 and 2013. During this period, the unemployment rate remained at about 7%, the national poverty rate was reduced from 18% to 9.7% and the minimum wage was raised from 4,800 pesos to 10,000 pesos (outpacing an average annual inflation rate of 7%). His government also supported strengthening trade unions. According to the International Trade Union Confederation, Uruguay became the most advanced country in the Americas in terms of respect for "fundamental labor rights, in particular freedom of association, the right to collective bargaining and the right to strike".

The Uruguayan Constitution does not allow presidents to run for immediate re-election; as such, Mujica was unable to run again in the 2014 election. On 1 March 2015, Mujica's term as president came to an end. He was succeeded by Vázquez, who returned to office for a second non-consecutive term. According to BBC correspondent Wyre Davies, "Mujica left office with a relatively healthy economy and with social stability [Uruguay's] bigger neighbours could only dream of."

== Post-presidency (2015–2025) ==
Mujica continued to serve as a senator after his presidency from 2015 until 2020. Before the 2019 general election, Broad Front candidate Daniel Martínez considered Mujica as a possible choice to serve as Minister of Livestock, Agriculture, and Fisheries if he were to be elected president.

On 20 October 2020, Mujica resigned from the Senate—alongside fellow former president Julio María Sanguinetti—and announced his retirement from politics due to the COVID-19 pandemic and because of his age; Mujica was 85 years old at the time of his announcement. His seat in the Senate was taken by Alejandro Sánchez Pereira.

== Political positions ==
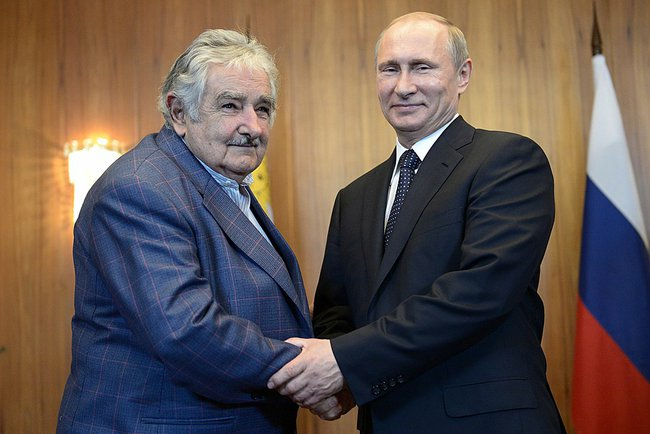
Mujica with Vladimir Putin in 2014

Mujica's political ideology evolved over the years from orthodox to pragmatist. In later years he expressed a desire for a more flexible political left. His speaking style and manner were credited as part of his growing popularity since the late 1990s, especially among rural and poor sectors of the population. He was variously described as an "antipolitician" and a man who "speaks the language of the people" while also receiving criticism for untimely or inappropriate remarks. Unlike President Vázquez, who vetoed a bill put forward by parliament that would make abortions legal, Mujica stated that were it to come before him in the future, he would not veto such a bill. In the sphere of international relations, he hoped to further negotiations and agreements between the European Union and the regional trade bloc Mercosur, of which Uruguay is a founding member. On the Uruguay River pulp mill dispute between Argentina and Uruguay, Mujica was more conciliatory toward the Argentine government than the previous administration, and in 2010 the two nations ended their long-running dispute and signed an agreement detailing an environmental monitoring plan of the river and the setting up of a binational commission. Good personal relations between Mujica and Argentinian counterpart Cristina Fernández de Kirchner helped lead to the accord. Other bilateral issues remained unsolved, including the dredging of the shared access channel of the River Plate.

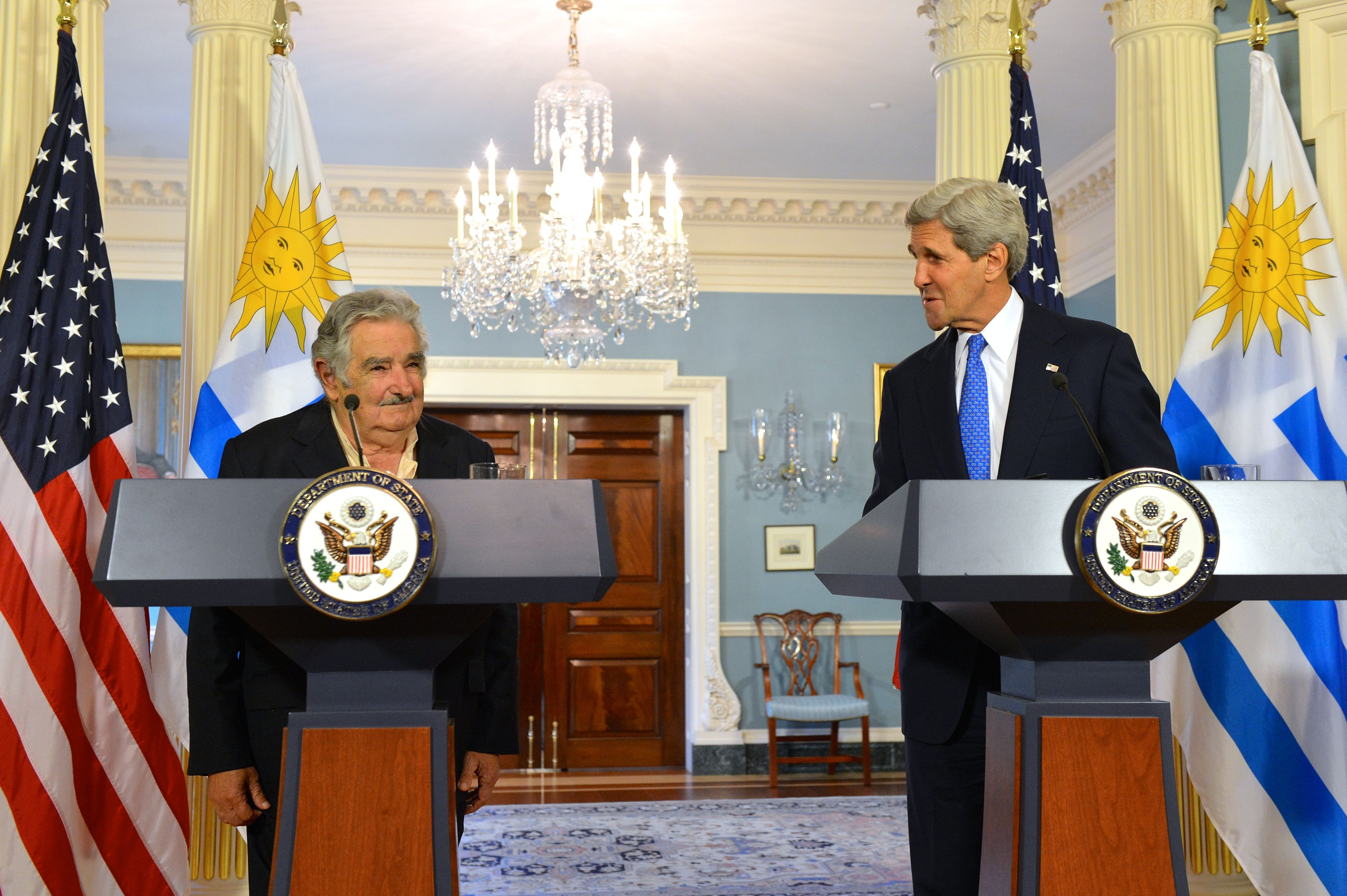
Mujica with John Kerry in 2014

He was close to Venezuelan President Hugo Chávez, whom he considered to be "the most generous ruler I have ever known". In 2011, he spoke out against the military operations launched by several Western countries against Libya. When asked about Brazilian President Lula da Silva's decision to warmly welcome Iranian leader Mahmoud Ahmadinejad, he answered it was a "genius move" because "the more Iran is fenced in, the worse it will be for the rest of the world".

During a talk at the 28th Guadalajara International Book Fair in Mexico on 7 December 2014, Mujica was interviewed by Mexican journalist Ricardo Rocha. He addressed several topics, such as drug trafficking, drug legalization, poverty, and social injustice: "We live on the most unjust continent in the world, probably the richest, but with the worst distribution [of wealth]." On Latin America, Mujica stated that he was "passionate about bringing Latin Americans together, about what defines us as belonging to a great nation that is to be created. There are multinational states, like China, like India, like what Europe is doing after a history of wars." Mujica also addressed the question of the shared linguistic heritage of Latin Americans, remarking with respect to the region's two major languages that "Portuguese is a sweet Spanish, if you speak it slowly... and even more so if it has a feminine sweetness." And he pointed out another element that unites the countries in Latin America: "We have another identity: the Christian and Catholic tradition." He concluded his talk by adding: "I see that there are many young people here; as an old man, a little advice: Life can set us a lot of snares, a lot of bumps, we can fail a thousand times, in life, in love, in the social struggle, but, if we search for it, we'll have the strength to get up again and start over. The most beautiful thing about the day is that it dawns. There is always a dawn after the night has passed. Don't forget it, kids. The only losers are the ones who stop fighting."

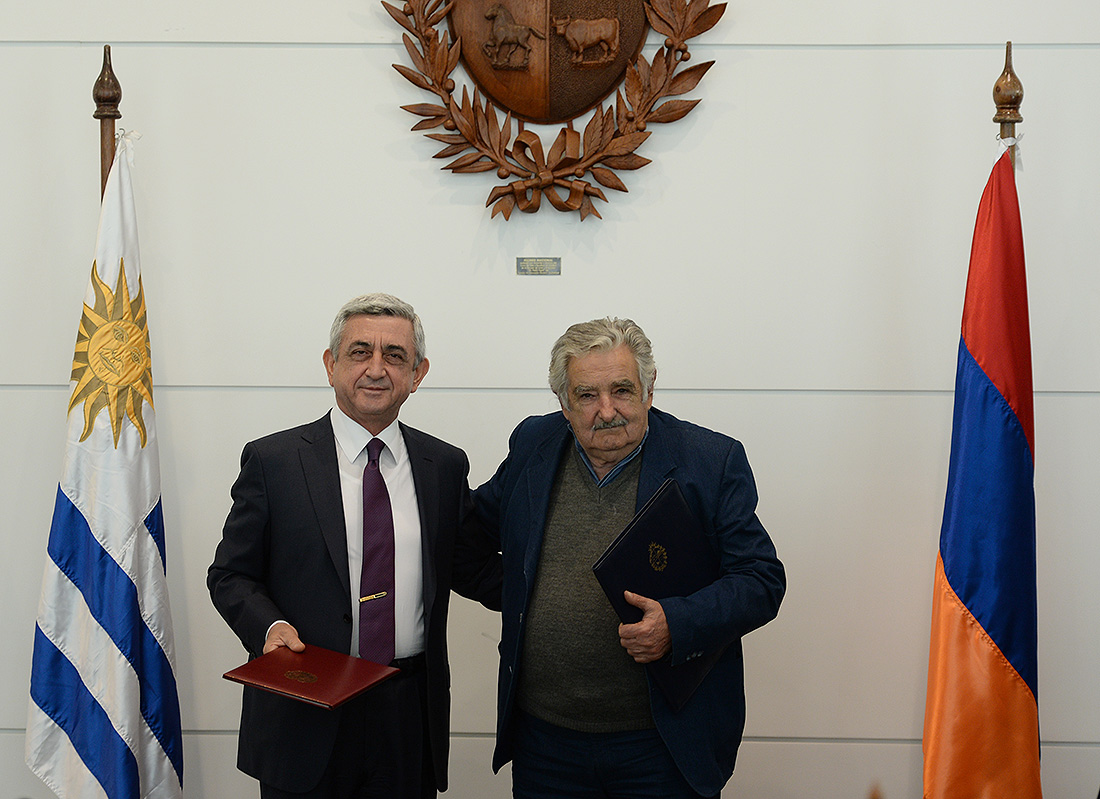
Mujica with Armenian President Serzh Sargsyan in 2014

After leaving the presidency, Mujica criticized the left-wing regimes of Daniel Ortega in Nicaragua and Nicolás Maduro in Venezuela for authoritarianism while opposing foreign intervention in the crisis in Venezuela. He also criticized former presidents Cristina Fernández de Kirchner in Argentina and Evo Morales in Bolivia for their political activity after leaving office, saying "How hard it is for them to let go of the cake!". He also described the election of Javier Milei as president of Argentina as "madness" and drew comparisons with Adolf Hitler's rise to power in 1930s Germany and the hyperinflation that preceded it. He also referred to Vladimir Putin as a "son of a bitch" and claimed that the Russian invasion of Ukraine could have been avoided.

== Personal life ==
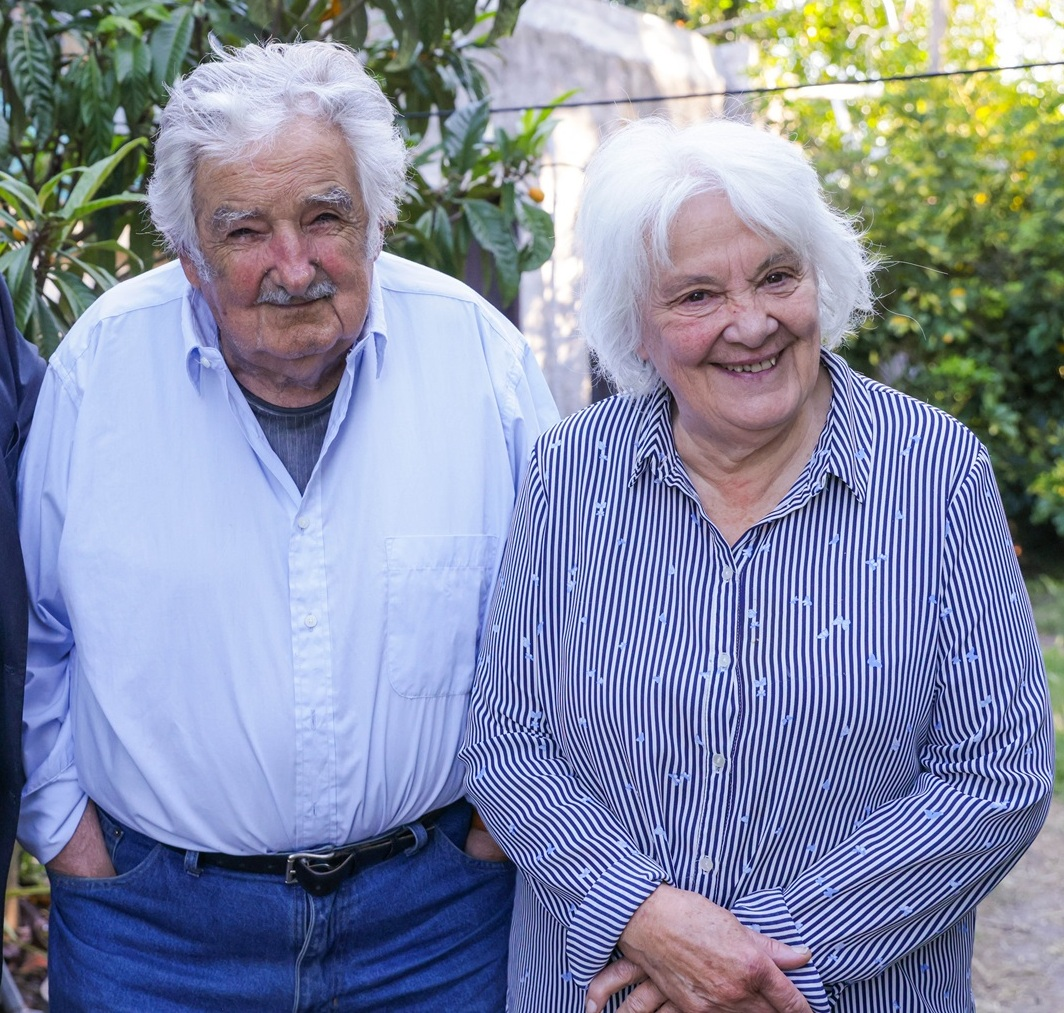
Mujica and his wife, Lucía Topolansky, in 2023

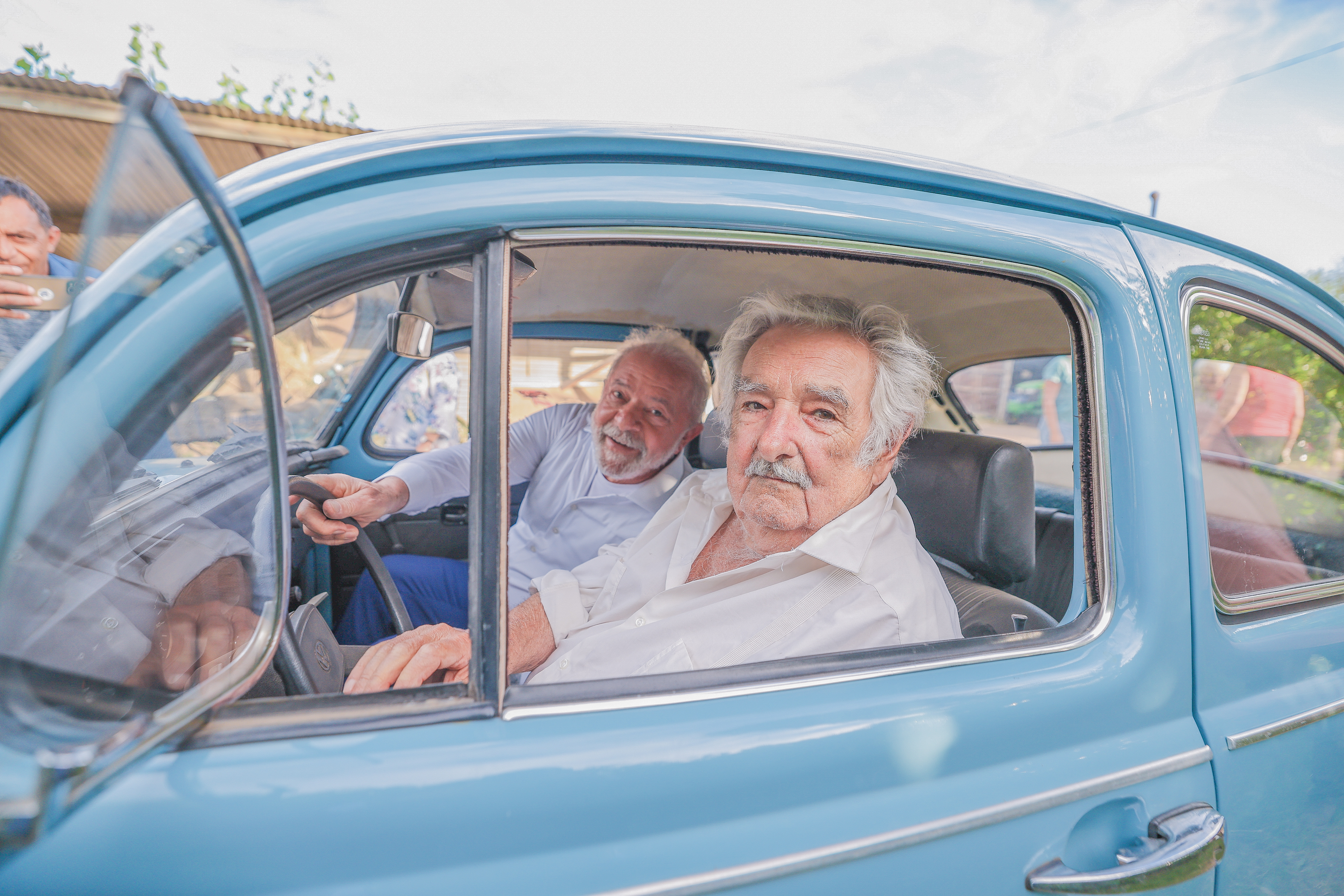
Mujica with Luiz Inácio Lula da Silva in his 1987 Volkswagen Beetle in 2023

In 2005, Mujica married Lucía Topolansky, a fellow former Tupamaros member, after many years of living together. They had no children and resided on a farm owned by Topolansky on the outskirts of Montevideo, where they cultivated chrysanthemums for sale. The couple owned several pets, formerly including a three-legged dog, Manuela. Topolansky briefly served as acting president in November 2010 while her husband took part in a business delegation in Spain and then-vice president Danilo Astori was on an official trip to Antarctica. Before then, she served in the Chamber of Deputies and the Senate.

Mujica drew worldwide attention for his simple lifestyle. He declined to live in the presidential palace or to use its staff during his presidency and used a 1987 Volkswagen Beetle and his 60-year-old bicycle as means of transportation. In 2010, the value of the car was US$1,800 and represented the entirety of the mandatory annual personal wealth declaration filed by Mujica for that year. In November 2014, the Uruguayan newspaper Búsqueda reported that he had been offered US$1,000,000 for the car; he said that if he did receive the US$1,000,000 for the car, it would be donated to house the homeless through a program that he supported.

Mujica's religious beliefs were the subject of interest and speculation by the press. In an interview with the BBC in November 2012, he stated, "I don't have a religion, but I am almost pantheistic; I admire nature." In a letter sent to Hugo Chávez in December 2012 wishing him a speedy recovery, he clarified that although he was "not a believer", he would call for a mass so that those who wanted to express their wishes for his health could do so. Mujica and Topolansky were both absent at the papal inauguration of Pope Francis in 2013. Topolansky clarified that their absence from the ceremony was because they "are not believers". Astori, who was a Catholic, attended the ceremony on their behalf. These statements led the press to generally consider Mujica one of the only two openly atheist presidents in the Americas, alongside Cuba's Raúl Castro. In a 2017 interview, Mujica discussed his beliefs: "My doubts with God are philosophical, or maybe I believe in God. Maybe, I don't know. [...] Or maybe, as I'm getting closer to death, I need it." He later spoke more fondly of the Catholic Church, which he acknowledged was "deeply entwined" in Latin American identity.

Mujica was an avid fan of association football and was a supporter of his local club Club Atlético Cerro. When the Uruguay national football team returned from their World Cup campaign in 2014 at Carrasco International Airport, and following FIFA suspending Uruguay's Luis Suárez from all football activities for four months after biting Italian defender Giorgio Chiellini, Mujica criticised the organisation, calling them "sons of bitches" who meted out "fascist" treatments. Realizing he was being filmed, Mujica covered his mouth. Journalists then asked if they could publish his remark, to which he replied in laughter "yes".

=== Illness and death ===
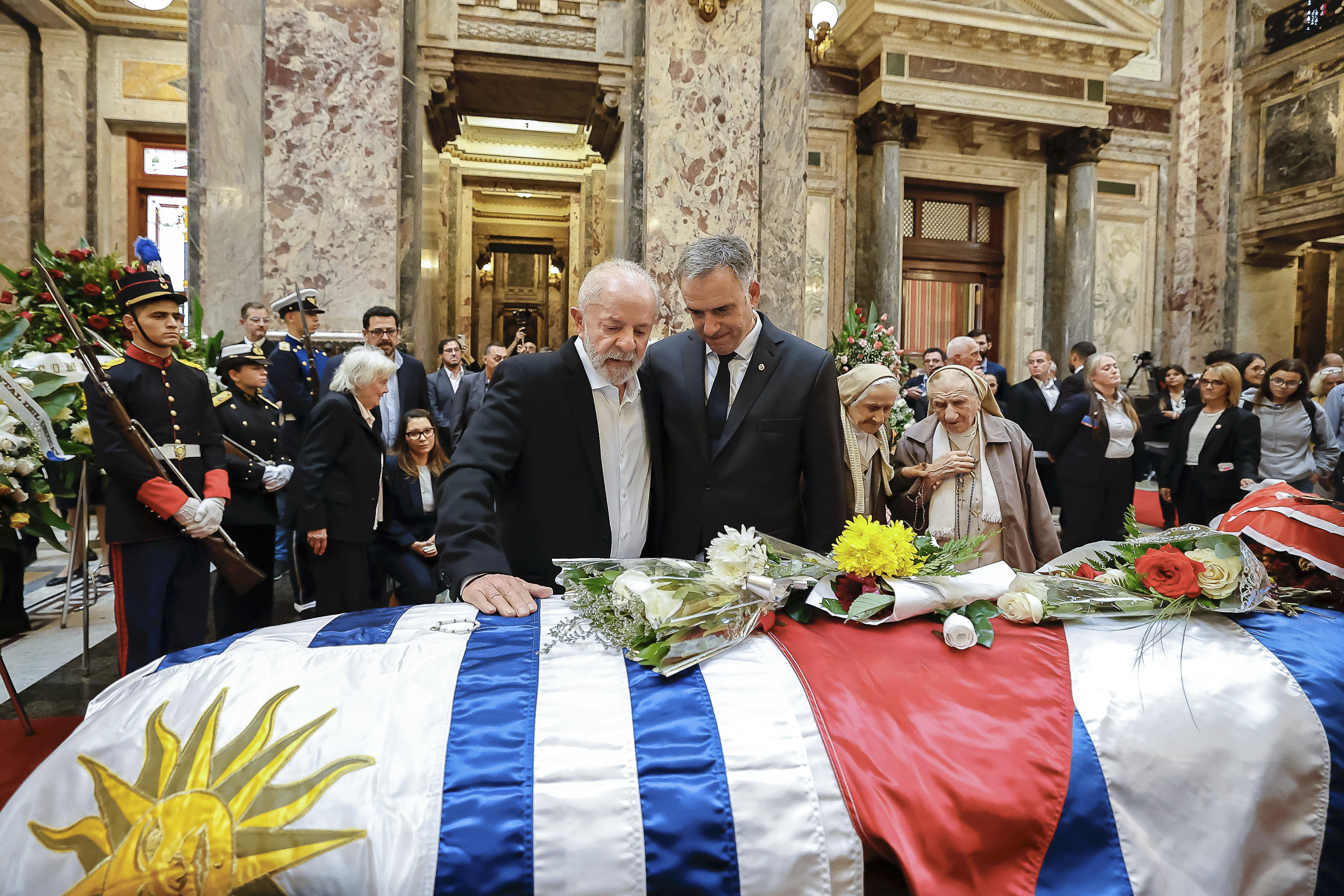
Lula da Silva and Yamandú Orsi showing their respect towards Mujica's coffin, May 2025

In April 2024, Mujica announced that he was diagnosed with esophageal cancer, which was found during a physical examination, adding that the risks to his condition were aggravated by a preexisting autoimmune disease. Despite his illness, Mujica campaigned for the successful presidential campaign of the Broad Front's Yamandú Orsi in the 2024 general election; Mujica later described Orsi's victory as a "farewell gift".

In January 2025, Mujica told Búsqueda that the cancer had spread to his liver and that he was dying, adding that he had decided to forego further treatment. On 12 May, Topolansky stated that Mujica was "terminally ill" and he was put under hospice care. Mujica died the following day, 13 May 2025, a week before his 90th birthday, at his farmhouse in Rincón del Cerro, on the outskirts of Montevideo; his death was announced by Orsi. The Uruguayan government declared three days of national mourning and his state funeral (which included a funeral procession) took place from 14 to 15 May on Montevideo, with the presence of Orsi, Topolansky, Lula da Silva, and Gabriel Boric, among others; it was estimated that 100,000 people attended his funeral. Mujica's remains were cremated on 16 May and later interred at his farmhouse.

== In popular culture ==
During the final months of 2013, Serbian film director Emir Kusturica started shooting a documentary on the life of Mujica, whom he considered "the last hero of politics". The film, titled El Pepe, una vida suprema, was released in 2018. In 2014 Italian author Frank Iodice (pen name of Franco Malanima) wrote the book Brief Dialogue on Happiness, which centers on Mujica's life. Ten thousand copies of the book were printed and distributed for free to school children. In June 2016, Mujica received the Order of the Flag of Republika Srpska from the president of Republika Srpska, Milorad Dodik.

Uruguayan film director Álvaro Brechner's 2018 film A Twelve-Year Night (La noche de 12 años) was based on Mujica's 12-year-long imprisonment under the military dictatorship. It premiered in official selection at the 75th Venice International Film Festival, and it was selected as the Uruguayan entry for the Best Foreign Language Film at the 91st Academy Awards. The film won the Golden Pyramid Award at the 40th Cairo International Film Festival.

Spanish singer-songwriter Rozalén included a speech of Mujica at the end of her song "Girasoles" from her pop-themed album Cuando el río suena.... In 2021, Caro De Robertis published a novel based on Mujica's life, entitled The President and the Frog (published in 2022 as El presidente y la rana). In 2023, Haitian filmmaker Arnold Antonin released a documentary titled Pepe Mujica, Nelson Mandela y Haiti.

== Honors and awards ==
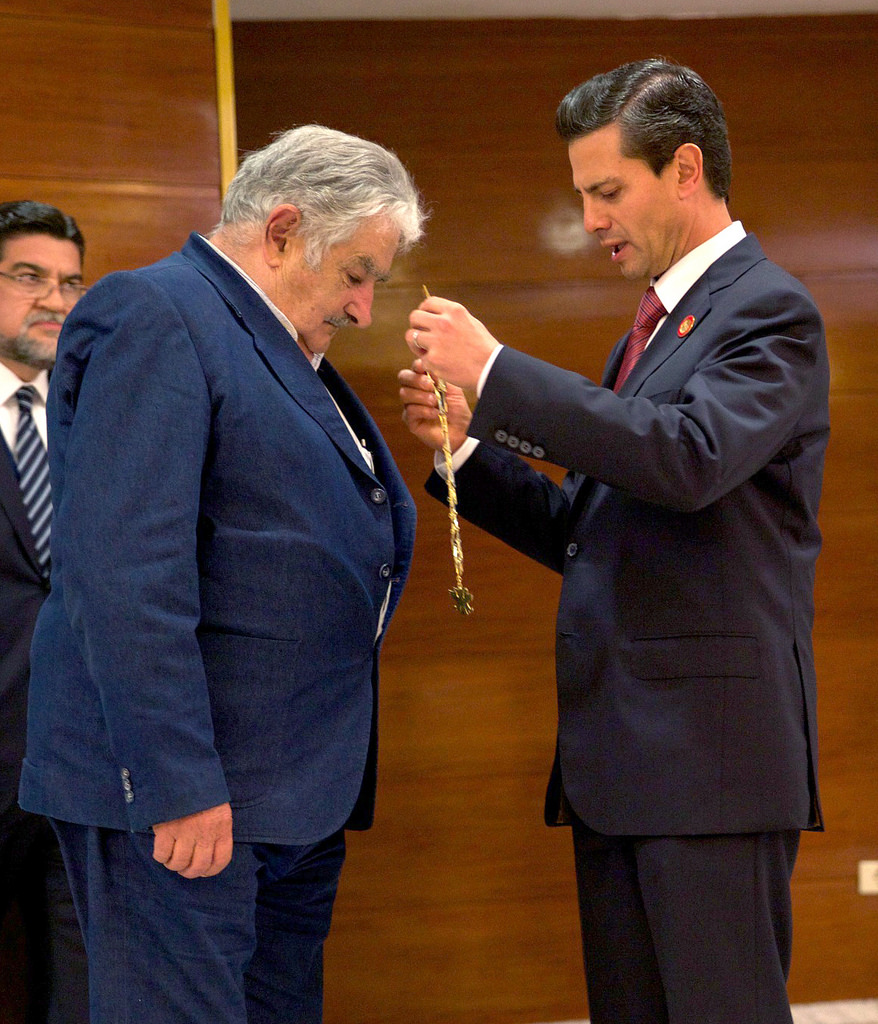
Mujica receiving the Collar of the Order of the Aztec Eagle from President Enrique Peña Nieto of Mexico in 2014

- Argentina:
  - Grand Collar of the Order of the Liberator General San Martín (25 January 2021)
- Brazil:
  - Grand Collar of the Order of the Southern Cross (5 December 2024)
- Colombia:
  - Extraordinary Grand Cross of the Order of Boyacá (5 December 2024)
- Ecuador:
  - Grand Collar of the National Order of San Lorenzo (3 December 2014)
  - Grand Collar of the National Order of Merit (3 December 2014)
- Honduras:
  - Grand Cross of the Order of Francisco Morazán (28 February 2025)
- Mexico:
  - Collar of the Order of the Aztec Eagle (28 January 2014)
- Panama:
  - Grand Cross of the Order of Manuel Amador Guerrero (24 November 2017)
- Paraguay:
  - Grand Collar of the National Order of Merit (16 August 2010)
- Peru:
  - Grand Collar of the Order of the Sun of Peru (25 January 2011)
- Republika Srpska:
  - Second Class of the Order of the Flag of Republika Srpska (28 June 2016)

== See also ==
- List of people who have received a state funeral
- List of presidents of Uruguay

== Notes ==
Political offices
Preceded by Martín Aguirrezabala	Minister of Livestock, Agriculture and Fisheries; 2005–2008	Succeeded by Ernesto Agazzi
Preceded by Tabaré Vázquez	President of Uruguay; 2010–2015	Succeeded by Tabaré Vázquez
Diplomatic posts
Preceded by Dési Bouterse	President pro tempore of UNASUR; 2014–2015	Succeeded by Tabaré Vázquez
