= César di Candia =

Uruguayan writer and journalist (1929–2025)

César di Candia (24 October 1929 – 17 March 2025) was a Uruguayan journalist and writer.

== Life and career ==
Di Candia was born in Florida, Uruguay on 24 October 1929. He developed a long-lasting career in several relevant periodicals: El País, Lunes, El Dedo, Guambia, Repórter, Hechos, La Mañana, Marcha and Búsqueda.

He interviewed notorious politicians involved in the civic-military dictatorship. The interview with the retired General Hugo Medina in which he revealed giving orders to torture was a landmark in Uruguayan journalism.

His literary works reflected his experience in written media.

Di Candia died on 17 March 2025, at the age of 95.

== Selected works ==
Non-fiction

- Ni muerte ni derrota (1987, republished in 2006)
- El viento nuestro de cada día (1989)
- Los años del odio (1993)
- La generación encorsetada (1994)
- Grandes entrevistas uruguayas (editor, 2000)
- Sólo cuando sucumba (2003)
- Tiempos de tolerancia, tiempos de ira (2005)

Fiction

- El país del deja, deja (1996)
- Resucitar no es gran cosa (1997)
- Concierto para doble discurso y orquesta (2003)
- El pleito de la Princesa de Gales y otros relatos (2016)
