= Álvaro Ramos Trigo =

Uruguayan agronomist and politician

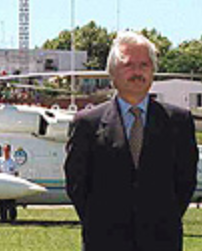
- Ramos in 1996

Senator of Uruguay
- In office 1998–2000

Minister of Foreign Relations
- In office 1 March 1995 – 2 February 1998
- President: Julio María Sanguinetti
- Preceded by: Sergio Abreu
- Succeeded by: Didier Opertti

Minister of Livestock, Agriculture, and Fisheries
- In office 1 March 1990 – 1 February 1993
- President: Luis Alberto Lacalle
- Preceded by: Pedro Bonino Garmendia
- Succeeded by: Pedro Saravia Fratti

Personal details
- Born: 11 March 1950 (age 76) Montevideo, Uruguay
- Party: National Party, Independent Party
- Education: UDELAR

Álvaro Ramos Trigo (Note: In this name that follows Hispanic American naming customs, the first or paternal surname is Ramos and the second or maternal family name is Trigo.) (born 11 March 1950) is a Uruguayan agronomist and politician.

== Biography ==
Álvaro Ramos Trigo was born in Montevideo in 1950. He graduated from the University of the Republic (UDELAR) as an agronomist, and he is an important consultant.

As a member of the National Party, he served twice in ministerial roles:

- Minister of Agriculture (1 March 1990 – 1 February 1993) during Luis Alberto Lacalle's tenure
- Minister of Foreign Relations (1 March 1995 – 2 February 1998) in Julio María Sanguinetti's second government

Elected to the Senate, he served 1998–2000.

He was also a candidate for vice president (1994 elections) and president (1999 primaries).

In 2021, Ramos Trigo left the National Party for the Independent Party.

He is a lecturer at ORT University.
