= Tabaré Aguerre =

Uruguayan agronomist

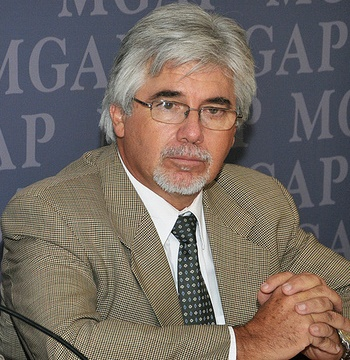

Minister of Livestock, Agriculture, and Fisheries of Uruguay
- In office March 1, 2010 – January 12, 2018
- President: José Mujica; Tabaré Vázquez
- Preceded by: Andrés Berterreche
- Succeeded by: Enzo Benech

Personal details
- Born: April 12, 1957 (age 69) Montevideo, Uruguay
- Party: Broad Front
- Education: University of the Republic

Tabaré Aguerre Lombardo (born 1957 in Montevideo) is an agronomist, entrepreneur and politician from Uruguay.

Aguerre is the Minister of Agriculture and Fisheries for Uruguay since 2010. He is Agronomist by the University of the Republic (Uruguay) and his first professional activity was to lead the technical team of a sugar mill at cooperative CALNU in Bella Union, Uruguay. During the 1980s he became and currently is a farmer as rice cultivator and cattle breeder in North of Uruguay. He was elected Member of the Executive Board and Vice-president of the Rice Farmers Association ACA (1988–2006) and President of that organization (2006–2009).

In 2010 he was appointed as Minister of Livestock, Agriculture, and Fisheries by President José Mujica and in 2015 was re-appointed as Minister by President Tabaré Vazquez.

During his tenure at the cabinet, Aguerre has led the design and implementation of policies that reinforce a sustainable intensification pathway for Uruguay Agriculture. He has been invited to present at several international events key policies undertaken such as the soil conservation, adaptation to climate change and resilience, environmental value added, and climate smart agriculture.
