= Frank Iodice =

Italian writer

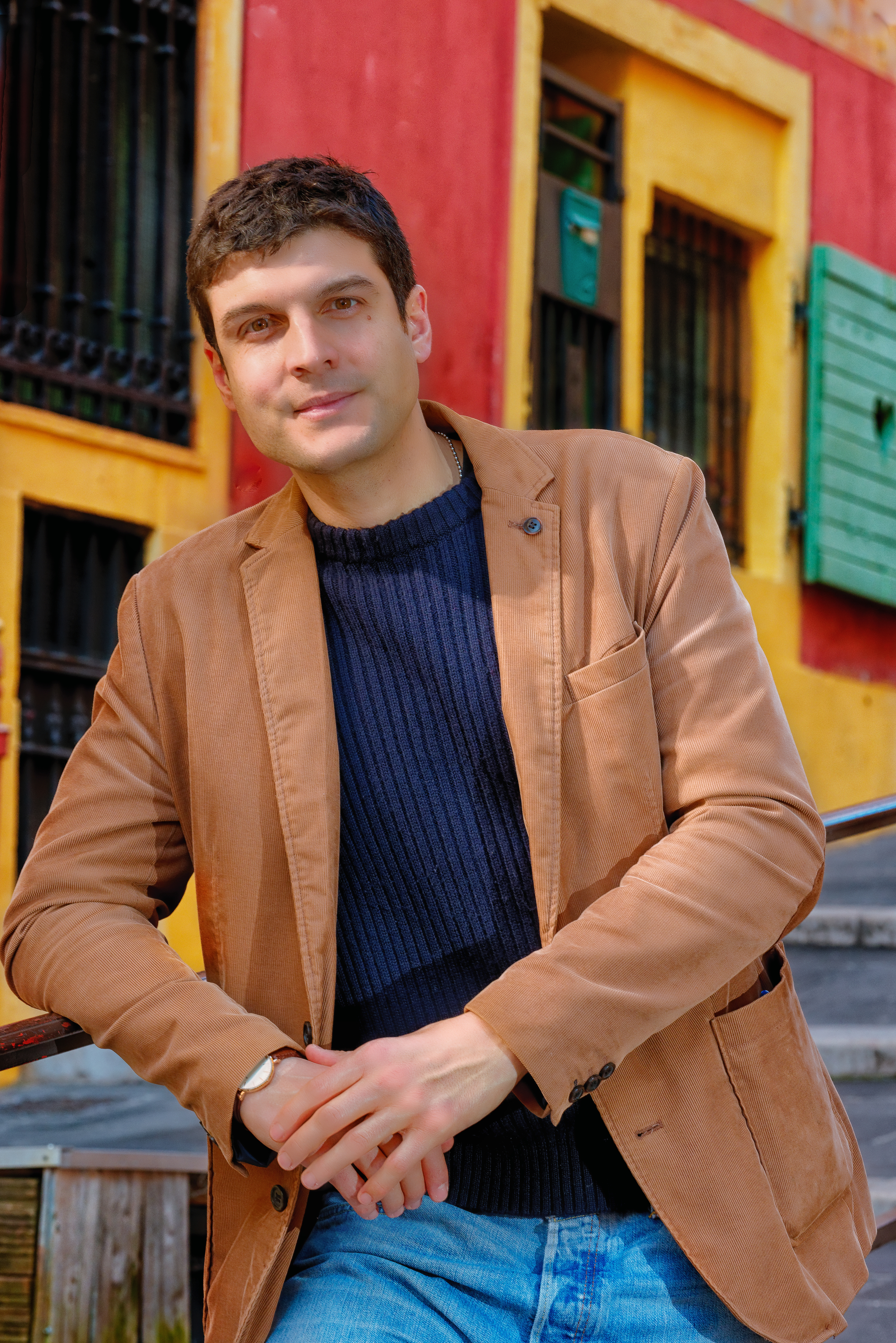
- Born: Naples, Italy
- Occupation: Author

Frank Iodice is an Italian writer.

== Biography ==
Frank Iodice (pen name of Franco Malanima) was born in Naples, Italy, on February 8, 1982 and he has since split his time living between France and the United States. He currently lives in Nice, France.

== Writing ==
Iodice is known for basing his literary works on experiences he has had. His fiction is also known for focusing on the human condition and internal dialogue of emotions. He has written books in both the Italian and French languages, with those books then being translated into further languages after his initial publications, including English, Spanish, and Portuguese.

== Books ==
In 2003 he released his novel Anne et Anne, which centers on the theme of seduction. In 2006 he published the short story collection La fabbrica delle ragazze, and he later published an additional collection in 2014 entitled La Catedral del tango. In 2011 Iodice published his work La folle vita di uno scrittore, a novel based upon a male protagonist who is bewitching to women yet cannot be tempted by their wiles. The following year, in 2012, he then released his book Acropolis. In 2013 he then published his work I disinnamorati, a police mystery. In 2014 he released his book Le api di ghiaccio, a novel based upon the fictional travels and adventures of psychiatrist Marcel Fontaine while trying to find a missing elderly patient alongside the patient’s daughter.

In 2014 he travelled to Montevideo, Uruguay to begin researching a book that would become the book Breve dialogo sulla felicità, which centers on the life of former Uruguayan President José “Pepe” Mujica. Ten thousand copies of the book were printed and distributed for free to local school children. In between this time he also published the books Un perfetto idiota in 2017, as well as the 2018 books Matroneum and La meccanica dei sentimenti. While in 2021 he published his novel La città del cordoglio, set in Naples.

After the death of his mother from COVID-19 in January 2022, he founded Articoli Liberi – Rivista di culture e letterature and began publishing under his name.

In 2022, he translated Sopravvissuta ("Survived"), a novel by Silvana Marconi denouncing gender-based violence, for which he also handled the editing and the Italian edition, with a foreword by Marta Occhipinti, a journalist for la Repubblica. The book was supported by the Italian Ministry of Foreign Affairs and presented at the Italian Cultural Institute in Montevideo.

In January 2025, the magazine became a publishing house focusing on authors of various nationalities translated into Italian.
