= Manuel Stirling =

Uruguayan politician

Manuel Stirling was a Uruguayan political figure of the 19th century.

== Background ==
He was from Paysandú, in the north of Uruguay.

His family funeral monument, an imposing 80-ton structure, declared a national historic monument in 2004, was built in 1898. His grandson, Guillermo Stirling, served as interior minister in early 21st century, and was the Colorado Party (Uruguay)'s presidential candidate in 2004.

== Political role ==
Stirling served as a deputy of the republic.

He also served as a senator of the republic.

== See also ==
- List of political families#Uruguay
- Politics of Uruguay
