= Ministry of Livestock, Agriculture, and Fisheries =

Government ministry of Uruguay

- Ministerio de Ganadería, Agricultura y Pesca
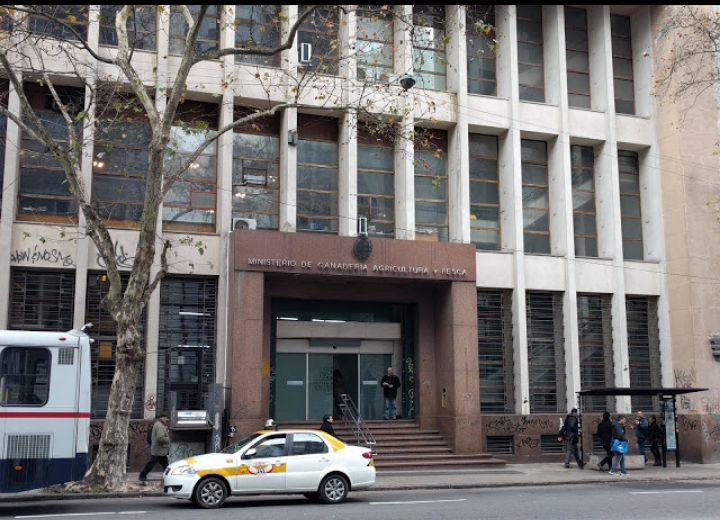

Ministry overview
- Formed: 19 March 1935
- Jurisdiction: Government of Uruguay
- Headquarters: Montevideo
- Minister responsible: Alfredo Fratti
- Website: Livestock, Agriculture, and Fisheries

The Ministry of Livestock, Agriculture, and Fisheries (Spanish: Ministerio de Ganadería, Agricultura y Pesca) of Uruguay is the ministry of the Government of Uruguay responsible for proposing and carrying out the government policy on agricultural, livestock and fishery resources. The ministry is also responsible for the permanent development of the agricultural, agroindustrial and fisheries sectors, promoting their insertion in both regional and extra-regional external markets, based on the management and sustainable use of natural resources.

This government department is headquartered in Constituyente Road in the Cordón neighbourhood, Montevideo.

== Creation ==
On March 19, 1935, after the dissolution of the Ministry of Industry, the Ministry of Industries and Labor and the Ministry of Livestock and Agriculture were created through the approval of Law No. 9,463. On July 11, 1974, its name was modified to the Ministry of Agriculture and Fisheries. It is not until April 1986 that it received the current name.

== List of ministers ==
Minister	Party	Period
Ministry of Livestock and Agriculture
Arturo González Vidart	National Independent Party	1943–1945
Gustavo Gallinal	National Independent Party	1946
Aquiles Espalter	Colorado Party	1947
Luis Alberto Brause	Colorado Party	1948–1949
Carlos L. Fischer	Colorado Party	1950
Luis Alberto Brause	Colorado Party	1951
Juan T. Quilici	Colorado Party	1952–1954
Ramón F. Bado	Colorado Party	1955
Amílcar Vasconcellos	Colorado Party	1955–1957
Joaquín Aparicio	Colorado Party	1957–1959
Carlos V. Puig	National Party	1959–1963
Wilson Ferreira Aldunate	National Party	1963–1967
Manuel Flores Mora	Colorado Party	1967–1968
Carlos Frick Davie	Colorado Party	1968–1969
Jaime Montaner	Colorado Party	1969
Juan María Bordaberry	Colorado Party	1969–1972
Héctor Viana Martorell	Colorado Party	1972
Benito Medero	National Party	1972–1974
Ministry of Agriculture and Fishing
Héctor Alburquerque¹	Without known affiliation	1974–1975
Julio Eduardo Aznárez¹	Without known affiliation	1975–1976
Luis Heriberto Meyer¹	Without known affiliation	1976–1977
Estanislao Valdés Otero¹	National Party	1977–1978
Luis Heriberto Meyer¹	Without known affiliation	1978
Jorge León Otero¹	Without known affiliation	1978–1979
Juan Cassou¹	Without known affiliation	1979–1981
Félix Zubillaga¹	Without known affiliation	1981
Francisco Tourreilles¹	Without known affiliation	1981
Carlos Mattos Moglia¹	Without known affiliation	1981–1985
Roberto Vázquez Platero	Colorado Party	1985–1986
Ministry of Livestock, Agriculture, and Fishing
Pedro Bonino Garmendia	Colorado Party	1986–1990
Álvaro Ramos Trigo	National Party	1990–1993
Pedro Saravia Fratti	National Party	1993–1994
Gonzalo Cibils	National Party	1994–1995
Carlos Gasparri	Colorado Party	1995–1998
Sergio Chiesa	Colorado Party	1998–1999
Ignacio Zorrilla de San Martín	Colorado Party	1999
Luis Brezzo	Colorado Party	1999–2000
Juan Notaro	Colorado Party	2000
Gonzalo González Fernández	National Party	2000–2003
Martín Aguirrezabala	Colorado Party	2003–2005
José Mujica	Broad Front	2005–2008
Ernesto Agazzi	Broad Front	2008-2009
Andrés Berterreche	Broad Front	2009–2010
Tabaré Aguerre	Broad Front	2010–2018
Enzo Benech	Broad Front	2018–2020
Carlos María Uriarte	Colorado Party	2020–2021
Fernando Mattos Costa	Colorado Party	2021–2025
Alfredo Fratti	Broad Front	2025–Incumbent
Source		

¹ Ministers of the Military-Civic government (1973–1985).

== See also ==
- Agriculture in Uruguay
