= Estanislao Valdés Otero =

Uruguayan politician (born 1931)

Estanislao Valdés Otero (born 18 August 1931 in Montevideo) is a Uruguayan lawyer, author, and politician.

During the Civic-military dictatorship of Uruguay he was Minister of Agriculture and Fisheries (2 February 1977 – 14 April 1978) and afterwards Minister of Foreign Relations (17 February 1981 – 2 September 1982). He was in charge of keeping Uruguay neutral during the Falklands War.

== Works ==
- Derechos de autor: régimen jurídico uruguayo. Prologue by Eduardo J. Couture (Facultad de Derecho, Montevideo, 1953).
- Inflación y subdesarrollo (Fundación de Cultura Universitaria, 1992).
