= 2009 Uruguayan general election =

← 2004	25 October 2009; 29 November 2009 (runoff)	2014 →
- Registered: 2,563,397
- Turnout: 89.91% (first round) ▲0.29pp 89.18% (second round)
- Presidential election
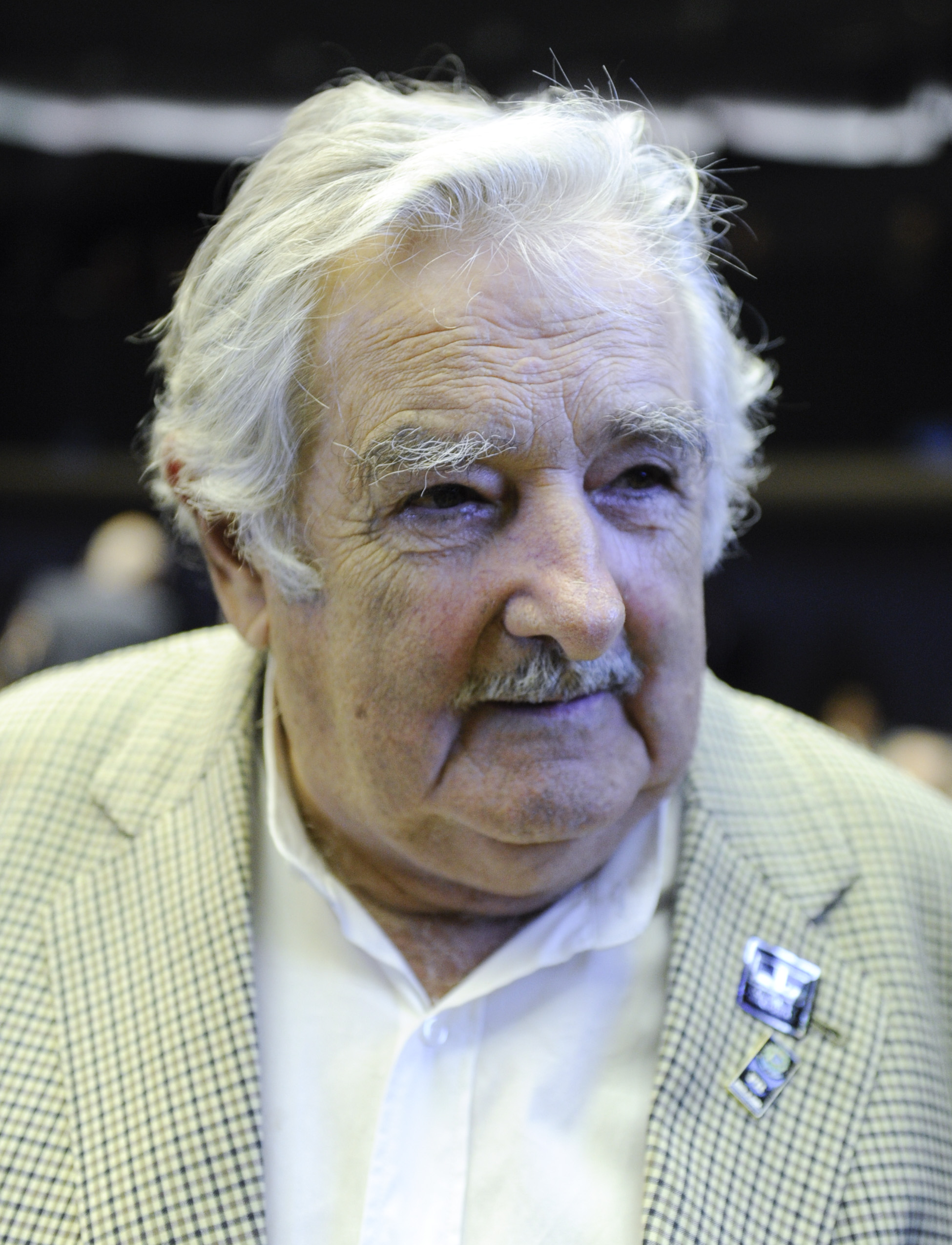

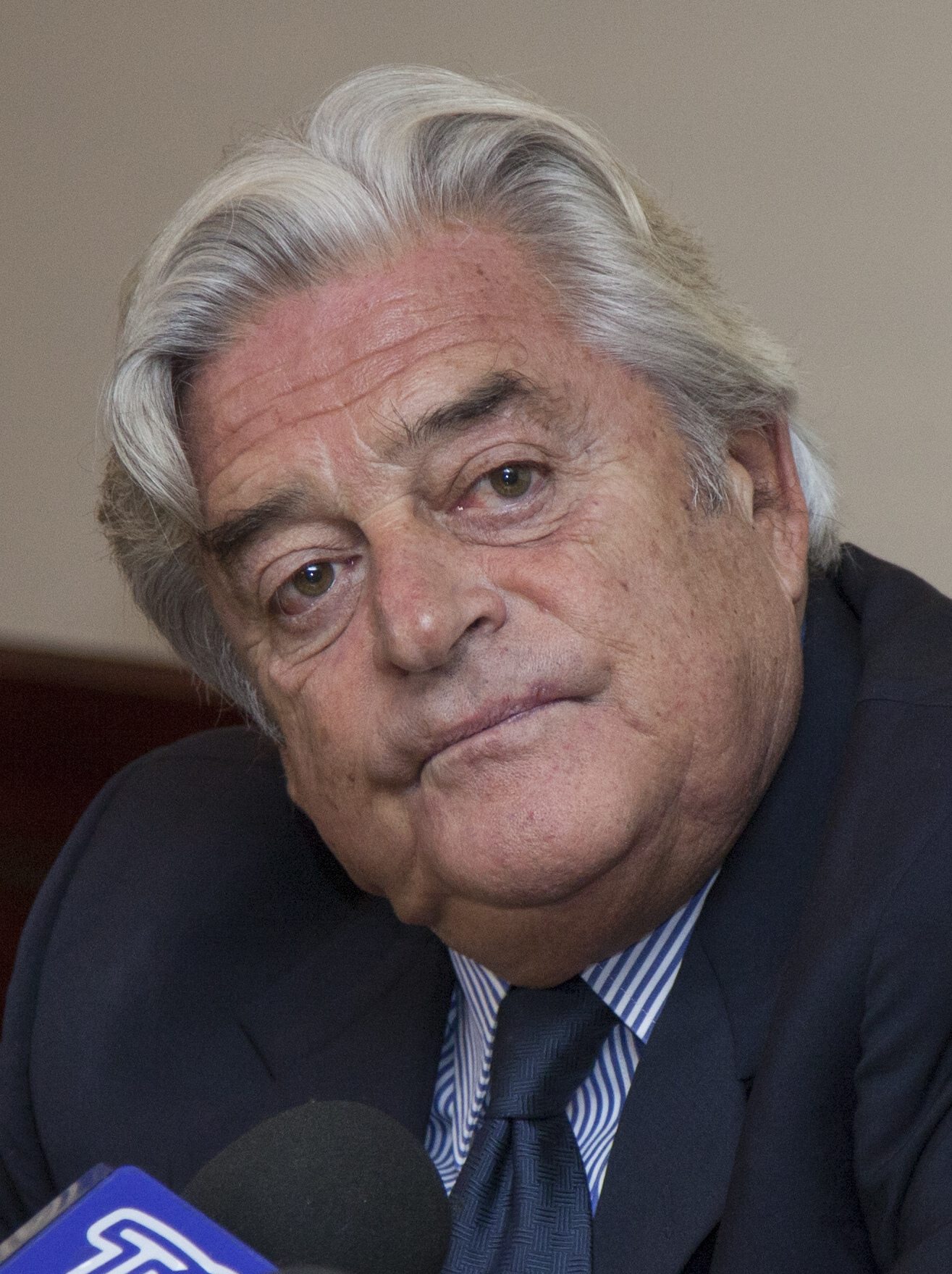
Nominee	José Mujica	Luis Alberto Lacalle
Party	MPP	National
Alliance	Broad Front
Running mate	Danilo Astori	Jorge Larrañaga
Popular vote	1,197,638	994,510
Percentage	54.63%	45.37%
President before election
Tabaré Vázquez
Broad Front
Elected President
José Mujica
Broad Front
- Parliamentary election
Party	Leader	Vote %	Seats	+/–
Chamber
Broad Front	José Mujica	49.34	50	−2
National	Luis Alberto Lacalle	29.90	30	−6
Colorado	Pedro Bordaberry	17.51	17	+7
Independent	Pablo Mieres	2.56	2	+1
Senate
Broad Front	José Mujica	49.34	16	0
National	Luis Alberto Lacalle	29.90	9	−2
Colorado	Pedro Bordaberry	17.51	5	+2
This lists parties that won seats. See the complete results below.
- Maps

General elections were held in Uruguay on 25 October 2009 alongside a two-part referendum. As no candidate for president received more than 50% of the vote, a second round was held on 29 November between the top two candidates, José Mujica of the ruling Broad Front (who received 48% of the vote) and former president Luis Alberto Lacalle of the National Party (29%). Mujica won the run-off with 55% of the vote.

In the parliamentary elections, the Broad Front retained its majorities in both chambers, winning 16 of the 30 seats in the senators and 50 of the 99 seats in the Chamber of Deputies. The National Party finished second with 9 senators and 30 deputies, the Colorado Party third with 5 Senators and 17 Deputies, and the Independent Party fourth with 2 deputies.

== Presidential candidates ==
Presidential primaries were held on 28 June to select the candidates.

Party	Candidate	Ideology	Previous result	
Party	Candidate	Ideology	Votes (%)	Seats
Broad Front	José Mujica	Democratic socialism Social democracy	50.45%	52 / 99 16 / 30
National Party	Luis Alberto Lacalle	Conservatism Christian democracy	34.30%	36 / 99 11 / 30
Colorado Party	Pedro Bordaberry	Liberalism	10.36%	10 / 99 3 / 30
Independent Party	Pablo Mieres	Christian humanism Christian democracy	1.84%	1 / 99 0 / 30
Popular Assembly	Raúl Rodríguez	Marxism	Did not contest	

== Results ==
Analysts indicated that Mujica won largely because of the popularity of the Broad Front and incumbent President Tabaré Vázquez's pro-business policies that had strengthened the country's economy. After taking office in 2005, Vazquez cut the unemployment rate from 12.3 to 7.3 percent, encouraged trade and foreign investment, increased wages and social spending, and boosted the central bank reserves and the country's credit rating.

The Broad Front retained a majority in parliament with 15 senators (plus Danilo Astori, later elected vice-president and thus president of the General Assembly) out of a total of 30 and 50 deputies out of a total of 99. The National Party came in second with 9 senators and 30 deputies. Both parties lost votes and legislative seats in comparison with 2004. The historically dominant Colorado made gains and increased its representation to 5 senators and 17 deputies. Finally, the Independent Party did not achieve its main goal of winning a seat in the Senate, but obtained 2 seats in the lower chamber.

Pedro Bordaberry led the Colorado Party to a notable electoral recovery, practically doubling its votes cast in 2004. The Independent Party, with candidates Pablo Mieres and Iván Posada, gained an additional seat in the Chamber of Deputies. Popular Assembly, a small, new extreme left party, did not win much support.

Party	Presidential candidate	First round		Second round		Seats			
Party	Presidential candidate	Votes	%	Votes	%	Chamber	+/–	Senate	+/–
Broad Front	José Mujica	1,105,262	49.34	1,197,638	54.63	50	–2	16	0
National Party	Luis Alberto Lacalle	669,942	29.90	994,510	45.37	30	–6	9	–2
Colorado Party	Pedro Bordaberry	392,307	17.51			17	+7	5	+2
Independent Party	Pablo Mieres	57,360	2.56			2	+1	0	0
Popular Assembly	Raúl Rodríguez	15,428	0.69			0	New	0	New
Total		2,240,299	100.00	2,192,148	100.00	99	0	30	0
Valid votes		2,240,299	97.21	2,192,148	95.90				
Invalid/blank votes		64,387	2.79	93,810	4.10				
Total votes		2,304,686	100.00	2,285,958	100.00				
Registered voters/turnout		2,563,250	89.91	2,563,250	89.18				
Source: Corte Electoral

=== By department ===
First round
Constituency	Broad Front			National Party			Colorado Party			Independent Party			Others (Note: Parties which gained no parliamentary representation: Popular Assembly.)		Valid votes		Invalid votes	
Constituency	Votes	%	D	Votes	%	D	Votes	%	D	Votes	%	D	Votes	%	Votes	%	Votes	%
Artigas	19,362	36.9	1	21,464	40.9	1	9,801	18.7	0	422	0.80	0	113	0.22	51,162	97.6	1,266	2.4
Canelones	166,185	51.0	8	91,412	28.1	4	46,580	14.3	2	7,888	2.42	0	2,374	0.73	314,439	96.6	11,131	3.4
Cerro Largo	24,968	40.1	1	26,508	42.6	1	8,489	13.6	0	609	0.98	0	162	0.26	60,736	97.6	1,490	2.4
Colonia	35,369	38.4	1	32,720	35.5	1	19,221	20.9	1	2,134	2.32	1	216	0.23	89,660	97.4	2,418	2.6
Durazno	14,870	34.7	1	17,819	41.6	1	8,019	18.7	0	876	2.05	0	121	0.28	41,705	97.4	1,131	2.6
Flores	6,146	30.9	1	8,815	44.3	1	4,162	20.9	0	243	1.22	0	73	0.37	19,439	97.8	439	2.2
Florida	19,750	38.4	1	18,604	36.2	1	10,459	20.3	0	1,147	2.23	0	227	0.44	50,187	97.6	1,225	2.4
Lavalleja	14,411	30.8	1	19,522	41.7	1	10,488	22.4	0	1,040	2.22	0	128	0.27	45,589	97.3	1,275	2.7
Maldonado	44,580	40.9	2	34,409	31.6	1	23,231	21.3	1	3,145	2.88	0	318	0.29	105,683	96.9	3,353	3.1
Montevideo	522,205	56.2	24	202,210	21.8	9	138,987	15.0	7	31,238	3.36	1	9,687	1.04	904,327	97.3	24,997	2.7
Paysandú	37,056	45.6	1	28,451	35.0	1	11,677	14.4	1	1,456	1.79	0	286	0.35	78,926	97.2	2,299	2.8
Rio Negro	15,480	40.5	1	11,604	30.4	1	9,447	24.7	0	612	1.60	0	96	0.25	37,239	97.5	942	2.5
Rivera	24,974	33.9	1	25,976	35.2	1	20,002	27.1	1	724	0.98	0	144	0.20	71,820	97.5	1,873	2.5
Rocha	22,123	41.4	1	18,067	33.8	1	10,305	19.3	0	879	1.64	0	281	0.53	51,655	96.6	1,819	3.4
Salto	39,982	46.3	1	23,344	27.0	1	19,445	22.5	2	1,243	1.44	0	216	0.25	84,230	97.5	2,202	2.5
San Jose	30,783	42.8	1	25,305	35.2	1	11,860	16.5	1	1,378	1.92	0	439	0.61	69,765	97.0	2,189	3.0
Soriano	27,595	43.7	1	19,098	30.3	1	13,530	21.4	0	893	1.41	0	260	0.41	61,376	97.2	1,741	2.8
Tacuarembó	25,312	37.2	1	28,605	42.1	1	11,251	16.6	1	964	1.42	0	175	0.26	66,307	97.6	1,659	2.4
Treinta y Tres	14,111	38.1	1	16,009	43.3	1	5,353	14.5	0	469	1.27	0	112	0.30	36,054	97.5	938	2.5
Total	1,105,262	47.96	50	669,942	29.07	30	392,307	17.02	17	57,360	2.49	2	15,428	0.67	2,240,299	97.21	64,387	2.79
Source: Corte Electoral

Second round
Constituency	Broad Front		National Party		Valid votes		Invalid votes	
Constituency	Votes	%	Votes	%	Votes	%		
Artigas	21,823	42.5	28,133	54.8	49,956	97.3	1,411	2.7
Canelones	180,138	55.7	130,099	40.2	310,237	95.9	13,288	4.1
Cerro Largo	28,190	45.9	31,147	50.7	59,337	96.6	2,092	3.4
Colonia	39,763	43.5	47,993	52.5	87,756	96.1	3,595	3.9
Durazno	17,160	40.6	23,581	55.7	40,741	96.3	1,558	3.7
Flores	7,477	38.1	11,253	57.3	18,730	95.4	893	4.6
Florida	22,196	43.5	26,612	52.2	48,808	95.7	2,209	4.3
Lavalleja	16,664	35.8	27,928	60.0	44,592	95.8	1,945	4.2
Maldonado	50,314	46.4	53,110	48.9	103,424	95.3	5,103	4.7
Montevideo	552,578	59.8	332,232	35.9	884,810	95.7	39,451	4.3
Paysandú	39,123	48.9	37,865	47.3	76,988	96.2	3,018	3.8
Rio Negro	17,263	45.8	18,899	50.2	36,162	96.0	1,522	4.0
Rivera	29,677	41.0	39,930	55.2	69,607	96.2	2,764	3.8
Rocha	24,107	45.5	26,252	49.5	50,359	95.0	2,640	5.0
Salto	44,375	52.0	37,944	44.5	82,319	96.5	2,985	3.5
San Jose	33,644	47.1	34,866	48.8	68,510	95.9	2,953	4.1
Soriano	30,521	48.9	29,164	46.7	59,685	95.5	2,784	4.5
Tacuarembó	27,191	40.5	37,627	56.1	64,818	96.6	2,298	3.4
Treinta y Tres	15,434	42.2	19,875	54.3	35,309	96.4	1,301	3.6
Total	1,197,638	52.39	994,510	43.51	2,192,148	95.9	93,810	4.10
Source: Corte Electoral
