= Guillermo Stirling =

Uruguayan politician

Guillermo Stirling (born March 4 1937) is a Uruguayan notary and political figure.

== Background and political alignment ==
Stirling is a prominent member of the Uruguayan Colorado Party. He has been a close colleague of Presidents Julio María Sanguinetti and Jorge Batlle.

His grandfather Manuel Stirling was a Deputy and Senator for Paysandú.

Stirling was President of the Chamber of Deputies of Uruguay from March 1, 1995 to March 1, 1996.

== Ministerial office ==
He served as Ministry of the Interior under the Presidency of Julio María Sanguinetti (2nd Presidency) from 1 November 1998 to 1 March 2000.

He subsequently served in the same office under Jorge Batlle's Presidency from 1 March 2000 to 13 July 2004, but Stirling resigned.

== Presidential candidate, 2004 ==
He was the unsuccessful Colorado Party candidate in the 2004 Presidential elections, gaining 11% of the vote, which came about following a period of considerable economic instability.

== Later political alignment with Pedro Bordaberry Herrán ==
Stirling was seen as closer to Pedro Bordaberry Herrán for the Presidential elections in 2009, as opposed to former Vice President of Uruguay Luis Antonio Hierro López, who was also seen as a likely contender for the Colorado Party's candidacy. However, it was thought that Stirling himself and his internal voting recommendations did not command a very large personal following within the party. It was also thought that for the 2009 elections Stirling, (1937–), who served in the government of President Jorge Batlle, (1927–2016), had to some extent been eclipsed by politicians of the generation of Pedro Bordaberry, (1960–), whose 'Vamos Uruguay' grouping within the Colorado Party Stirling in any case endorsed, prior to his retirement from politics in 2008 at the age of 71.

== See also ==
- List of political families#Uruguay
- Politics of Uruguay#Political parties and elections
- Colorado Party (Uruguay)
- Manuel Stirling#Political role
- Pedro Bordaberry#Formation of Vamos Uruguay
