= Ernesto Agazzi =

Uruguayan agronomist and politician

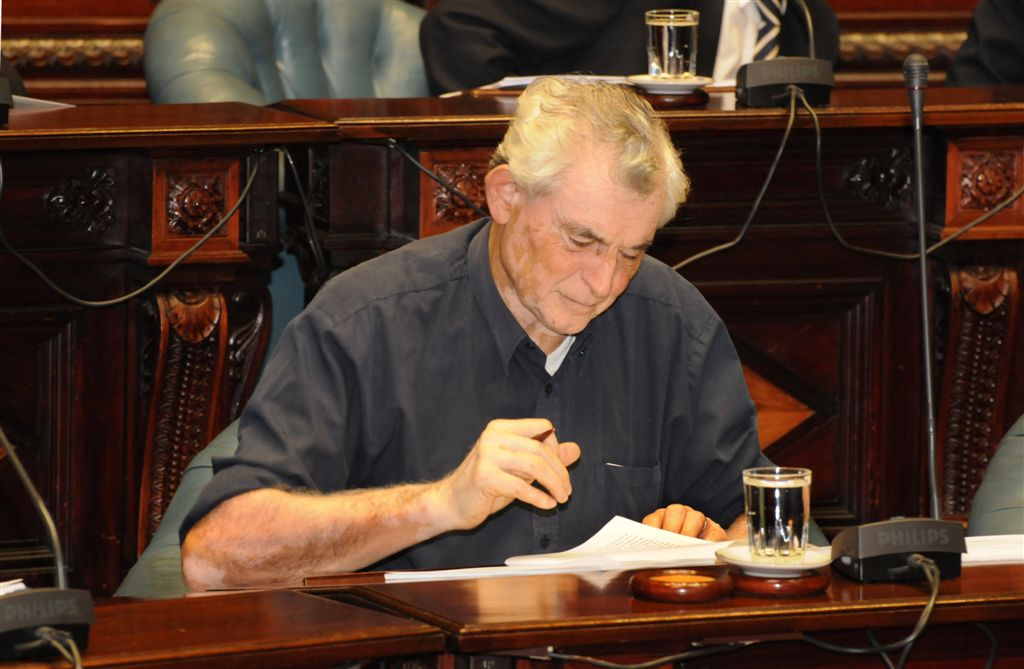
Agazzi in the Senate.

Ernesto Agazzi (born 4 September 1942) is a Uruguayan agronomist and politician, belonging to the Broad Front.

He served as Minister of Livestock, Agriculture, and Fisheries and he was also a member of the Senate of Uruguay.
