= Liberal Party (Uruguay) =

Uruguayan political party

Liberal Party Partido Liberal
- Founded: 2002
- Dissolved: 2009
- Ideology: Liberalism; Economic liberalism

Website
- partidoliberal.com.uy

The Liberal Party (Spanish: Partido Liberal) was a Uruguayan political party founded in 2002, espousing free market liberalism. The party thinks that the economic heyday of the Uruguay at the end of the 19th century was a consequence of the application of political initiatives founded in the liberal ideas, and that the abandonment of the same ones on the part of the successive governments from the Batlle period has determined the process of social and economic deterioration that the country suffers from 1955.

== History ==
On August 22, 2002, nine Uruguayan citizens founded the Liberal Party. They agreed on a Program of Principles, gave the Liberal Party an Organic Letter, named the first director and Julio Vera as its first president; one week later they presented to the Electoral Court the Request of Motto (see Ley de lemas).

After waiting more than a year, the Liberal Party obtained the necessary authorization from the Electoral Court, for official resolution of the above-mentioned corporation of January 21, 2004, communicated to the interested ones on January 30, 2004. From this moment, the Liberal Party is enabled to use the Partido Liberal (Liberal Party) motto in the electoral process that would celebrate the same year in the Eastern Republic of Uruguay.

In accordance with the current Constitution in 2004, the first instance of the electoral process is the internal elections, where every party chooses those who will integrate his Convention, and the candidate who will participate in the presidential election. In the above-mentioned instance, the Liberal Party obtained slightly more than 1.500 votes and Julio Vera was elected as candidate.

The first convention of the Liberal Party was held on August 22, 2004 at Montevideo. In accordance with the established for the constitution and the laws of the Eastern Republic of Uruguay, the convention realized the election of authorities for the period 2004–2009 and the election of the "formula companion" (that is, the one who accompanies the candidate to President and who is "elected" as Vice-president in case the party prevails in the election). In this occasion, the election of authorities determined the continuity of Julio Vera as President of the Liberal Party, and Jorge Borlandelli as "formula companion" or Vice-president candidate.

In the national elections of 2004, the Liberal Party obtained 1.548 votes.

== See also ==
- Liberalism worldwide
- List of liberal parties
- Liberal democracy
