= Independent Party (Uruguay) =

Political party in Uruguay

Independent Party Partido Independiente
- Leader: Pablo Mieres
- Founded: 11 November 2002; 23 years ago
- Split from: New Space
- Headquarters: Av. Italia 2580, Montevideo
- Ideology: Christian humanism
- Political position: Centre
- National affiliation: Republican Coalition
- Colours: Yellow, Purple
- Chamber of Deputies: 1 / 99
- Senate: 0 / 30
- Intendencias: 0 / 19
- Mayors: 3 / 125

Website
- www.partidoindependiente.org.uy

The Independent Party (Spanish: Partido Independiente) is a Christian humanist political party in Uruguay. The party is led by Pablo Mieres, who was presidential candidate in the 2004 national elections and in 2009.

== Ideology ==
In its beginning, the party's goal was to build a third way away from the heterodox left-wing coalition Frente Amplio and the traditional right-of-centre National Party, alongside the Colorado Party. Nevertheless, the party integrated the centre-right government coalition for the 2020 to 2025 period.

== History ==
Founded in 2002 by Pablo Mieres, Mieres left the New Space in aftermath of Rafael Michelini's decision to rejoin Broad Front

=== 2004 election ===
At the 2004 national elections, it won 1.89% of the popular vote, one seat in the Chamber of Deputies (which is occupied by Iván Posada), and none in the Senate. It is the fourth largest party in Uruguay, and the smallest with parliamentary representation.

=== 2009 election ===
At the 2009 national elections, it won 2.49% of the popular vote, and two seats in the Chamber of Deputies (occupied by Iván Posada and Daniel Radío).

=== 2014 election ===
At the 2014 national elections, it won 3.09% of the popular vote. They claimed three seats in the Chamber of Deputies (occupied by Iván Posada, Daniel Radío and Heriberto Sosa), and one seat at the Senate (occupied by Pablo Mieres).

== Election results ==
=== Presidential elections ===
Election	Party candidate	Running mate	Votes	%	Votes	%	Result
Election	Party candidate	Running mate	First Round		Second Round		Result
2004	Pablo Mieres	Iván Posada	41,011	1.84%	—		Lost ✗
2009	Pablo Mieres	Iván Posada	57,360	2.49%	—		Lost ✗
2014	Pablo Mieres	Conrado Ramos	73,379	3.09%	—		Lost ✗
2019	Pablo Mieres	Mónica Bottero	23,580	1.01%	—		Lost ✗
2024	Pablo Mieres	Mónica Bottero	41,618	1.79%	—		Lost ✗

=== Chamber of Deputies and Senate elections ===
Election	Votes	%	Chamber seats	+/-	Senate seats	+/-	Position	Size
2004	41,011	1.84%	1 / 99	New	0 / 30	New	Opposition	4th
2009	57,360	2.49%	2 / 99	▲1	0 / 30	0	Opposition	4th
2014	73,379	3.09%	3 / 99	▲1	1 / 30	▲1	Opposition	4th
2019	26,313	1.01%	1 / 99	▼2	0 / 30	▼1	Coalition (PN–PC–CA–PG–PI)	▼7th
2024	41,618	1.79%	1 / 99	0	0 / 30	0	Opposition	▲6th
