= Pablo Mieres =

Uruguayan politician

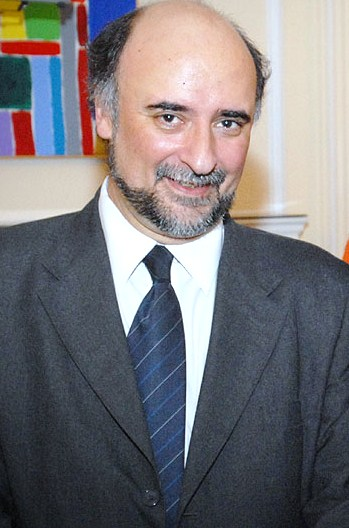
- Mieres in 2008

Minister of Labour and Social Welfare of Uruguay
- In office 1 March 2020 – 2 May 2024
- President: Luis Alberto Lacalle Pou
- Preceded by: Ernesto Murro
- Succeeded by: Mario Aritzi

Senator of Uruguay
- In office 15 February 2015 – 15 February 2020

Personal details
- Born: Pablo Andrés Mieres Gómez; 30 July 1959 (age 67) Montevideo, Uruguay
- Party: Independent Party
- Spouse: Rossana Aboy Mombelli
- Children: Federico, Ignacio and Verónica
- Education: University of the Republic

Pablo Andrés Mieres Gómez (born 30 July 1959 in Montevideo) is a Uruguayan politician of the Independent Party (PI), who served as Minister of Labour and Social Welfare from 2020 to 2024 under President Luis Lacalle Pou. He previously served as National Representative from 2000 to 2005 and as Senator of the Republic from 2015 to 2020.

== Early life and education ==
Mieres was born in Montevideo, on July 30, 1959, the eldest of three brothers. Raised in the Centro neighborhood, he attended Catholic school Inmaculada Concepción "Los Vascos" and John XXIII Institute.

He obtained a degree in law from the University of the Republic, and a degree in sociology from the Latin American Center for Human Economy.

== Political career ==
In 1979 he joined the Christian Democratic Party.

He was elected to the Uruguayan Parliament in 1999, serving during the 2000–2005 term as a representative for Montevideo. In 2004 he was one of the founders of the centre-left Independent Party (PI).

He was a presidential candidate in the 2004 and 2009 general elections, opportunities in which he was also a senatorial candidate, a position to which he was not elected.

=== 2014 ===
In the national elections of 2014 he was a candidate for the Presidency and the Senate, reaching this time, a seat in the Upper House. His party obtained 3.2% of the votes and reached three seats in the Chamber of Deputies (Iván Posada, Daniel Radío and Heriberto Sosa).

In the 2014 general elections, once again he ran for the Presidency and the Senate, finally getting access to a seat in the Upper House.

=== 2019 ===
For the 2019 primary elections, Mieres created La Alternativa, a new political space, made up of politicians from other parties: Esteban Valenti and his wife Selva Andreoli (Broad Front), Fernando Amado (Colorado Party), Victor Lissidini (Party Intransigent) and Luis Franzini Batlle (Colorado Party). However, this alliance was short lived. After announcing that Andreoli was the candidate for Vice President, she herself made controversial statements. Mieres left the alliance.

Mieres did not achieve reelection in the Senate for the period 2020–2025; but he supported Luis Alberto Lacalle Pou in the second round against Daniel Martínez Villamil. Looking at the conformation of Lacalle Pou's cabinet, Mieres agreed to head the Ministry of Labour and Social Welfare.
