= Búsqueda (Uruguay) =

Newspaper in Uruguay

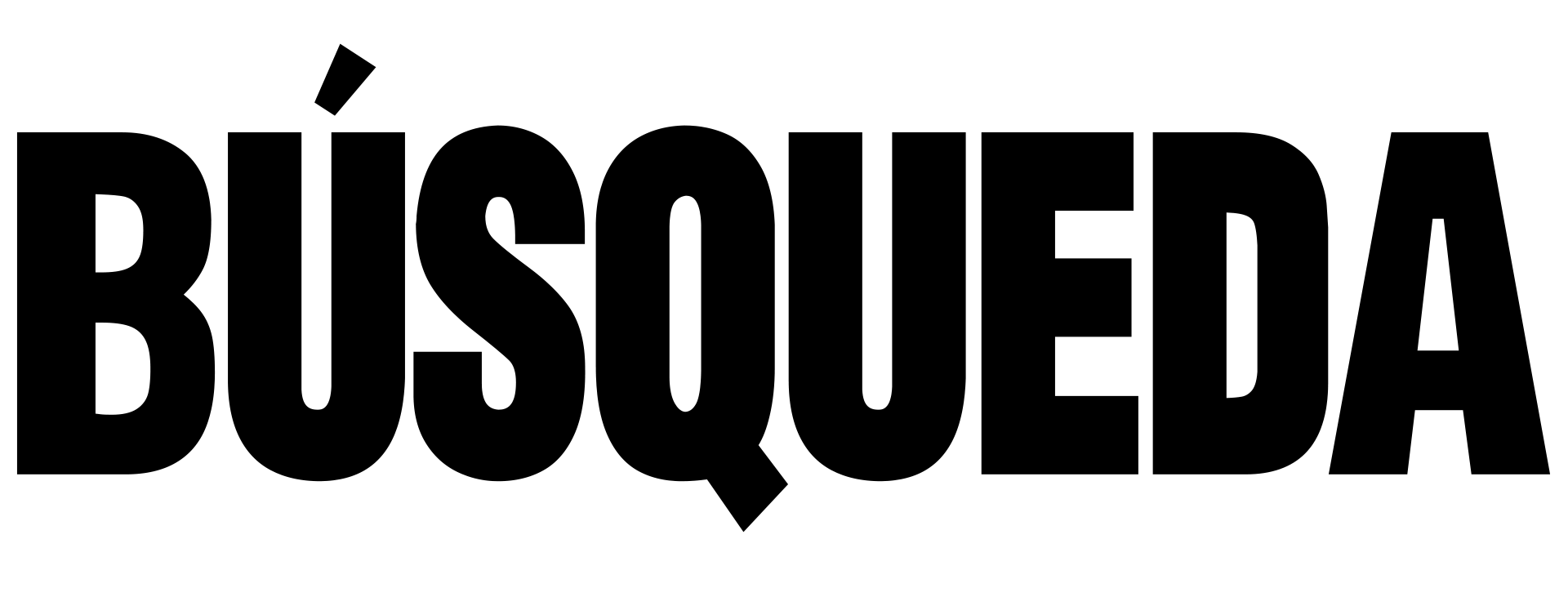

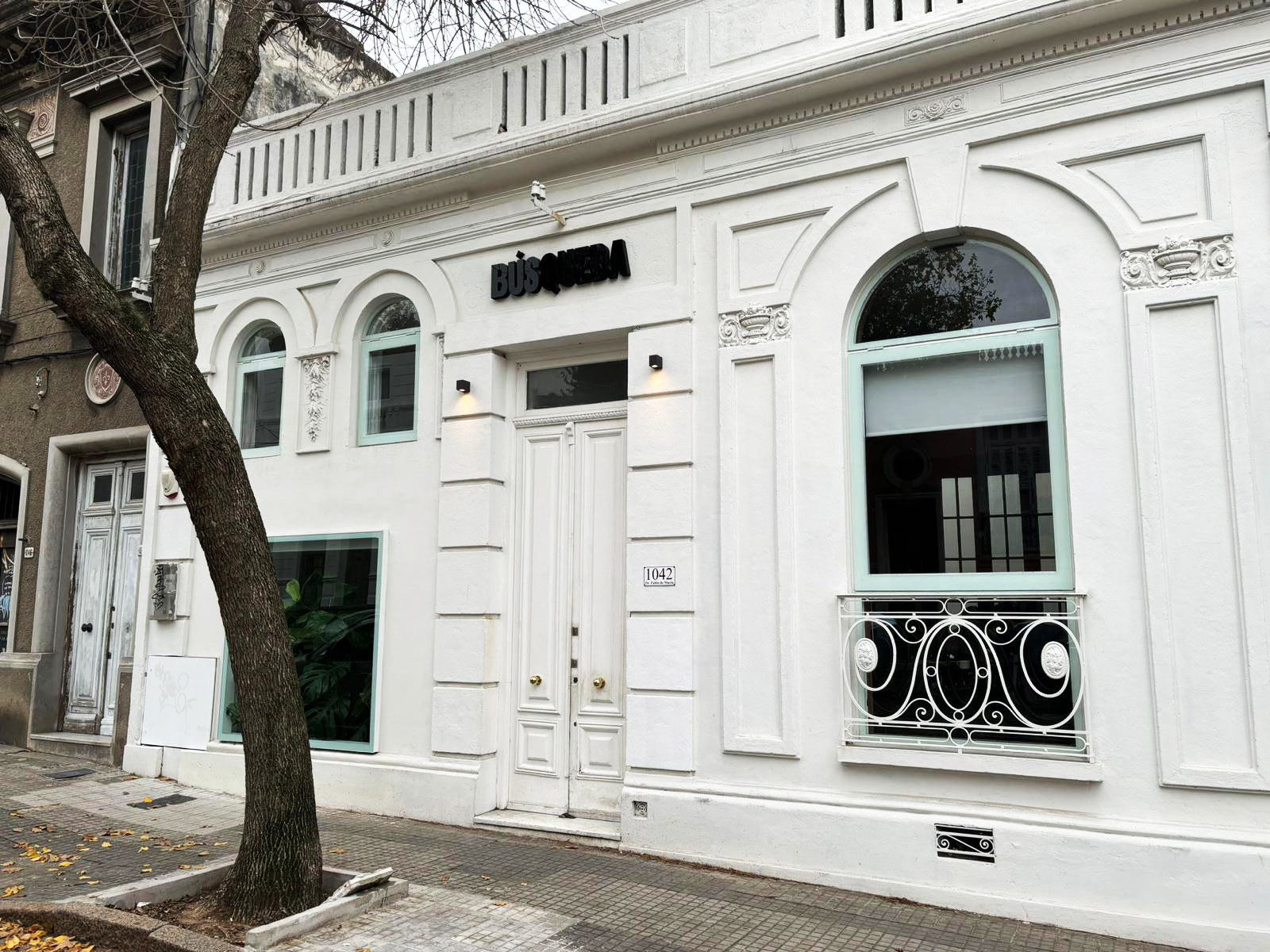
- Headquarters of Búsqueda in 2024.
- Type: Weekly newspaper
- Format: Tabloid
- Founded: January 1972; 54 years ago
- Political alignment: Economic liberalism
- Headquarters: Montevideo, Uruguay
- OCLC number: 801840945
- Website: www.busqueda.com.uy

Búsqueda ("Research") is a Uruguayan weekly newspaper published since 1972.

== General information ==
Established in the early 1970s when Uruguay was still dominated by statism, Búsqueda sought to advocate for economic liberalism. One of its foremost journalists was Ramón Díaz.

It has national coverage and is printed on white tabloid paper; only advertisements are coloured. Búsqueda used to feature only political and economic news, but culture, science, health, humour and sports sections were added later. Since 2000, a women's magazine named Galería has been sold together with Búsqueda.

Opinions tend to be concentrated in columns and editorials, mostly with a classical liberal view. Photographs are small and never used in politics and economy sections. According to The New York Times, sociologist César Aguiar noted that "Citibank and the Communist Party [of Uruguay] both advertise in its pages".

Together with Brecha, it is considered one of the two most influential political weekly newspapers in Uruguay.
