= 1983 Uruguayan pro-democracy demonstration =

Acto del Obelisco
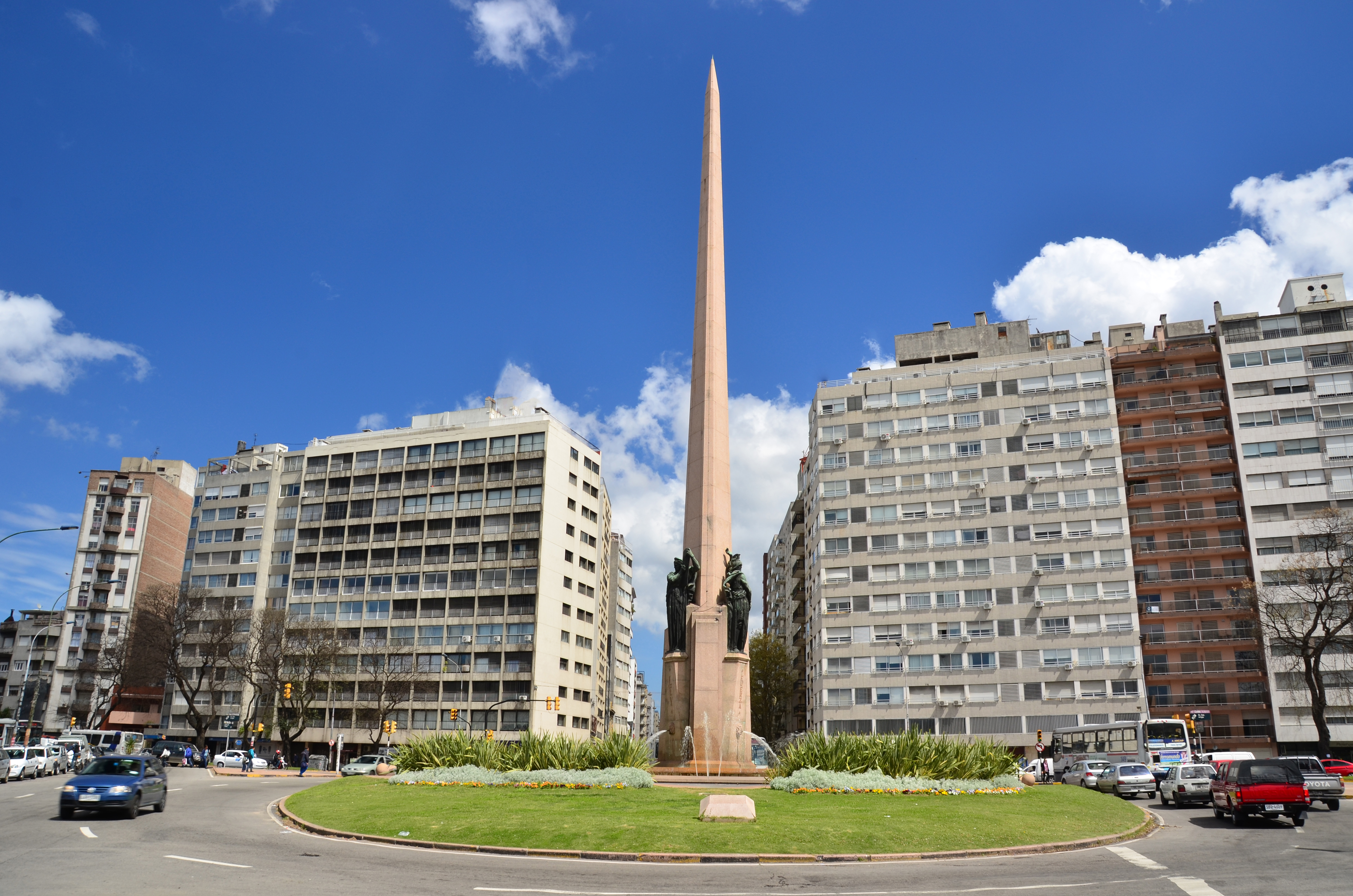
- Obelisk of Montevideo
- Native name: Acto del Obelisco
- English name: Obelisk Act
- Date: November 27, 1983; 42 years ago
- Location: Obelisk of Montevideo, Montevideo, Uruguay

The 1983 Uruguayan pro-democracy demonstration, known as Acto del Obelisco (Spanish for 'Obelisk Act') was a massive demonstration held at the Obelisk of the Constituents, Montevideo, Uruguay, on November 27, 1983. The objective of the act was to demand the end of the civil-military dictatorship and the holding of democratic elections. At the event, the only speaker, actor Alberto Candeau, read the proclamation, in which he called for a democratic transition.

The demonstration was organized by an alliance built between the three political parties that had been legalized for the primary elections the previous year, an instance that marked progress in the democratic opening. The parties came together under the banner of "For a democratic Uruguay without exclusions", and it is estimated that around 400,000 protesters participated, making it the largest demonstration in the history of the country. Due to a famous aerial photograph of the tree-lined Luis Morquio Avenue filled with protesters in what looked like a river, the event was given the name Río de Libertad (Spanish for 'River of Freedom'). Although it took place in the capital Montevideo, similar events were held in different cities of the country, also attracting a large number of people.

== Background ==
The civil-military dictatorship in Uruguay had been installed after the coup d'état of 1973. The dictatorial regime outlawed political parties and prohibited social and union activism. In 1980, a referendum was called to legitimize a series of decrees issued since 1976 that granted a predominant role to the Armed Forces in politics. However, the "No" option was the winner with approximately 57% of the vote, which meant the beginning of opening to democracy. In 1982, primary elections were held in the political parties that had been legalized: the two traditional parties, the National and the Colorado, and the Civic Union. Left-wing groups, such as the Broad Front, remained banned and cannot participate in the elections. The National Party obtained 49% of the votes, while the Colorado Party and the Civic Union, 42.3% and 1.2%, respectively.

In 1983 there began to be greater dialogue between the military junta and the political parties. In addition, due to the banning of the CNT, the Inter-Union Plenary of Workers (PIT) was created, which on May 1 organized the first demonstration for International Workers' Day since the coup d'état. That year, a series of talks were held at the Parque Hotel between the military authorities and the politicians elected the previous year, but in the end they did not reach an agreement, since at the beginning of July the representatives of the political parties withdrew due to the "insurmountable discrepancies" and the still existing repression.

Due to the suspension of the talks in Parque Hotel, in August the National, Colorado and Civic Union parties formed an alliance called "Intersectorial", which aimed to organize demonstrations to demand a democratic transition. Sectors of the Broad Front that were still outlawed joined in, as well as social movements.

== Proclamation ==
Citizens: we have not appeared here today in our capacity as supporters of a certain political community, authorized or excluded, which we do not deny and which we display with legitimate pride, each one according to his honest convictions. We have come in our common capacity as Uruguayans and patriots, heirs of a legacy of freedom, peace, justice, respect and tolerance for all ideas, devotion to legality and repudiation of all expressions of force and the violence. ...

— Alberto Candeau (1983)

The only speaker of the event was the actor Alberto Candeau, who read a proclamation written by the lawyers and politicians Enrique Tarigo and Gonzalo Aguirre Ramírez, who years later would serve as vice presidents for the Colorado and National parties, respectively. In some cities, speakers were installed that transmitted the proclamation or it was read by local politicians, such is the case of Jorge Larrañaga who was in charge of doing so in Paysandú.

130 personalities from the Colorado Party, National Party, Civic Union and several of the member parties of the Broad Front, as well as union and student leaders from all political and social spectrums, were positioned on the stage of the event. Among them were the future presidents Julio María Sanguinetti and Jorge Batlle, the future vice president and minister Danilo Astori, Carlos Julio Pereyra, Uruguay Tourné, journalist Guillermo Chifflet, the trade unionist José D'Elía, Héctor Grauert and Elisa Delle Piane, widow of Zelmar Michelini.

Throughout the event, proclamations of accessions from the Archbishop of Montevideo Carlos Parteli, from the Nobel Peace Prize winners Adolfo Pérez Esquivel and Lech Wałęsa, from the Uruguayan Bar Association, among others, were read.

After the reading of the proclamation, thousands of people marched along 18 de Julio Avenue to Plaza Independencia.

== Government response ==
The military junta repudiated the event and the proclamation. President Gregorio Conrado Álvarez stated in a speech on a cadena nacional that "if one of the postulates of the act was the defense of democracy, it cannot be understood that those who, due to their ideology, have been and are its most recalcitrant enemies were present on the stage", referring to left-wing personalities with Marxist ideals. He added that they "acted as a subversive group, infiltrated educational centers, subverted all forms of national activity and intimidated the population due to violence and fear".

He concluded his address by saying: "At the end of this message, on behalf of the government and the Armed Forces, we declare: we will never disappoint the Oriental people by renouncing our responsibility when peace, freedom, justice and democracy are at stake, non-negotiable values of the Artiguist ideology. "The Oriental people do not live and will never live subject to doctrines of terrorism and slavery."

== Effects and legacy ==
After the Río de Libertad, negotiations with the military authorities resumed. In August 1984, the Naval Club Pact was carried out, which officially marked the beginning of the transition to democracy. A general election was called for November, in which Julio María Sanguinetti of the Colorado Party was elected President of Uruguay.

The event is considered the most important example of commitment to democracy in the history of the country, since it was a transcendental milestone for the democratic transition.
