= Naval Club Pact =

- Drafted: 1 August 1984; 41 years ago
- Location: Montevideo, Uruguay
- Sealed: 3 August 1984; 41 years ago
- Ratified: 15 August 1984; 41 years ago
- Parties: Military junta Colorado Party; Broad Front; Civic Union
- Languages: Spanish

The Naval Club Pact (Spanish: Pacto del Club Naval) was an agreement between the authorities of the military junta of the civil-military dictatorship of Uruguay and representatives of the political opposition. Secretly agreed on on August 3, 1984, at the naval club in the Carrasco neighborhood of Montevideo, it laid the foundations for the transition to democracy in the country.

== Background ==
The civil-military dictatorship was installed after the coup d'état of 1973. In 1981, a year after the electorate rejected a constitutional reform proposed by the regime to legitimize itself in a referendum, the Council of the Nation –the governing body composed of the Council of State and the Board of General Officers– appointed Army General Gregorio Conrado Álvarez as President of Uruguay.

In 1982, a greater political opening began, with the holding of primary elections in the political parties, and in 1983 the dialogue between the political and military authorities increased. That year talks were held at the Parque Hotel, which ultimately did not lead to any agreement. In November, a massive demonstration took place at the Obelisk of the Constituents of Montevideo demanding the holding of general elections and the end of the dictatorial regime.

After the 1982 primary elections and the demonstrations throughout the country, the civil opposition became the only valid interlocutor for the government.

== Negotiations ==
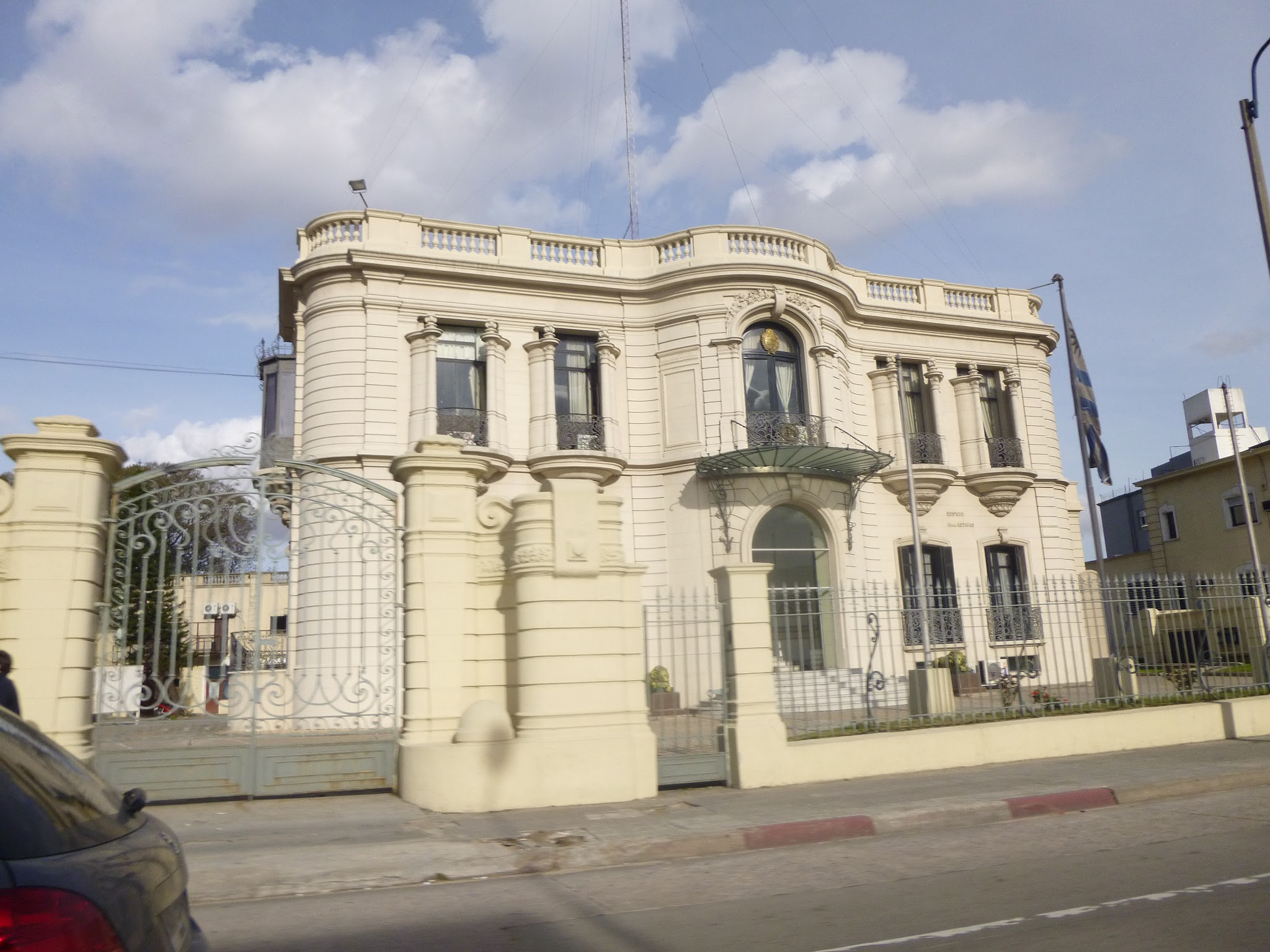
Blixen de Castro Palace, former headquarters of the Joint Chiefs of Staff where the talks began.

On July 6, 1984, talks were resumed at the headquarters of the Joint Chiefs of Staff –current headquarters of the Ministry of National Defense–. The commanders in chief of the three branches of the Armed Forces participated on behalf of the military government: Hugo Medina, Manuel Buadas and Rodofo Invidio, for the Army, the Air Force and the Navy, respectively.

The Civic Union was represented by Juan Vicente Chiarino and Humberto Ciganda. Julio María Sanguinetti, Enrique Tarigo and José Luis Batlle represented the Colorado Party. And on the other hand, the Broad Front was represented by the socialist José Pedro Cardoso and the Christian Democrat Juan Young, since both parties had been legalized throughout the talks. The National Party refused to participate in the talks because it was opposed to the military proposal of holding the elections with banned parties and politicians, among whom were its leader Wilson Ferreira Aldunate who had been imprisoned after his return from exile on July 16.

On July 31, the negotiation sessions were moved to the Naval Club, located in the Carrasco neighborhood. On August 1, Institutional Act No. 19 was drafted, and two days later, after both parties separately approved the document, the negotiation was concluded without the signing of any agreement. On August 15, Institutional Act No. 19 was ratified by the Government.

== Aftermath ==
The Naval Club Pact laid the foundations for the transition to democracy after almost 13 years of dictatorship. Three months after the ratification of Institutional Act No. 19, a general election was held in which both Ferreira Aldunate, Líber Seregni and Jorge Batlle were banned, and in which Julio María Sanguinetti was elected president of Uruguay.

On February 12, 1985, Gregorio Conado Álvarez resigned from the position of president, which was occupied by the president of the Supreme Court Rafael Addiego Bruno, until Sanguinetti took office on March 1, 1985, the date on which he ended officially the dictatorship in Uruguay.
