= 1971 Uruguayan general election =

General elections were held in Uruguay on 28 November 1971 alongside a double referendum. The result was a victory for the Colorado Party, which won the presidency and the most seats in the Chamber of Deputies and Senate.

Wilson Ferreira Aldunate of the National Party received the most votes for President of any individual candidate. However, as the combined Colorado vote exceeded the combined National vote by just over 12,000 votes, Colorado candidate Juan Maria Bordaberry became President. Under the Ley de Lemas system in effect at the time, the highest-finishing candidate of the party that won the most votes was elected President. This allowed Bordaberry to become President even though he personally received around 60,000 fewer votes than Ferreira.

The next month, US president Richard Nixon boasted to UK prime minister Edward Heath that Brazil, an ally of the US, had rigged the election to ensure that the left lost.

Fifteen months after taking office, Bordaberry carried out a self-coup, closing down the General Assembly and giving the military and police full powers to restore order. This marked the start of a civic-military dictatorship that ruled the country until the next free elections in 1984.

== Results ==
Party	Presidential candidate	Votes	%	Seats			
Party	Presidential candidate	Votes	%	Chamber	+/–	Senate	+/–
Colorado Party	Juan María Bordaberry	379,515	22.81	41	–9	13	–3
Colorado Party	Jorge Batlle Ibáñez	242,804	14.59	41	–9	13	–3
Colorado Party	Amílcar Vasconcellos	48,839	2.93	41	–9	13	–3
Colorado Party	Juan Luis Pintos	5,402	0.32	41	–9	13	–3
Colorado Party	Juan Pedro Ribas	4,025	0.24	41	–9	13	–3
Colorado Party	al lema	1,039	0.06	41	–9	13	–3
Colorado Party	Total	681,624	40.96	41	–9	13	–3
National Party	Wilson Ferreira Aldunate	439,649	26.42	40	–1	12	–1
National Party	Mario Aguerrondo	228,569	13.74	40	–1	12	–1
National Party	Antonio Fadol	35	0.00	40	–1	12	–1
National Party	al lema	569	0.03	40	–1	12	–1
National Party	Total	668,822	40.19	40	–1	12	–1
Broad Front	Líber Seregni	304,275	18.28	18	+16	5	+4
Christian Radical Union	Daniel Pérez del Castillo	8,844	0.53	0	New	0	New
Party of Retirees and Pensioners	Vázquez	288	0.02	0	New	0	New
Righteous Movement	Bolívar Espínola	241	0.01	0	New	0	New
Youth Party for Oriental Development	Suárez	25	0.00	0	New	0	New
Total		1,664,119	100.00	99	0	30	0
Valid votes		1,664,119	97.16				
Invalid/blank votes		48,647	2.84				
Total votes		1,712,766	100.00				
Registered voters/turnout		1,878,132	91.20				
Source: Electoral Court

== See also ==
- Operation Thirty Hours
