= List of ambassadors of Uruguay to East Germany =

Coordinates: 52.518245°N 13.382717°E

ambassador of Uruguay to East Germany
- Inaugural holder: Alfredo Dupetit Ibarra
- Formation: 1977

The Uruguayan ambassador in East Berlin was the official representative of the Government in Montevideo to the Government of East Germany.

== History ==
- Since 1972 the Embassy of Uruguay was in the Grimmnitzstraße 15 Karlshorst.
- Since 1975 the Embassy of Uruguay is in the street Clara Zetkin-Str. 89 (today Dorotheenstraße):
- 1st floor: Angolan Embassy in Berlin
- 2nd floor: Spanish Ambassador to East Germany
- 3rd floor: North Yemen Embassy
- 4th floor: Argentine Ambassador to East Germany and Lebanon
- 5th floor: Uruguay, Colombian Ambassador to East Germany
- 6th floor: the Indian Ambassador to East Germany.

== List of representatives ==
Diplomatic accreditation	ambassador	Observations	President of Uruguay	Leadership of East Germany	Term end
1977	Alfredo Dupetit Ibarra	Chargé d'affaires	Aparicio Méndez	Erich Honecker	January 1982
January 1982	Julio Cayetano Durañona Visconti	Chargé d'affaires	Gregorio Álvarez	Erich Honecker	December 1984
June 27, 1986	Leslie H. Close-Pozzo		Julio María Sanguinetti	Erich Honecker	October 3, 1990
