= Juan Vicente Chiarino =

Juan Vicente Chiarino (25 December 1901, Montevideo – 29 June 1989) was a Uruguayan lawyer and politician.

A prominent member of Civic Union, he served as Defence Minister during the first years of Julio María Sanguinetti's first presidential term.

== Biography ==
Chiarino graduated as a lawyer at the Law Faculty of the University of the Republic (Uruguay), was a militant of the Civic Union of the Catholic party and in the 1930s ran the newspaper "The Public Good" that diffusered ideas of the policy community. In 1944 he entered in the House of Representatives representing his party, after the Dardo Regules' resignation. In the 1946 elections Chiarino won a seat as an MP again. He was elected senator in the elections of 1950, and reelected in 1954, leaving the bench in 1959. In 1962, after consulting with a refreshing sector, Civic Union adopted the name of the Christian Democratic Party of Uruguay (PDC); Chiarino sided with the traditionalist group, and in 1965 walked away with the other new party and participated in the founding of the Christian Civic Movement (MCC), which was meager election results. In 1971, along with another PDC splinter group, led by Humberto Ciganda, co-founded the Radical Christian Union (URC) which also was successful in the elections of that year.

On the occasion of the 1982 primaries, Chiarino reappeared on the public stage. Two years later, participate in discussions of the Parque Hotel and the Naval Club Pact, turning points in the transition from Civic-military dictatorship of Uruguay to democracy.

Chiarino had a great respect and prestige of all sectors of the national political arena, made after the end of the transition to democracy in 1985 (in which he had ample participation), was appointed by President Julio María Sanguinetti, despite his advanced age, as head of the Ministry of National Defence. He was accompanied by his fellow undersecretary, Jose Maria Robaina Anso. From that position Chiarino had to face a troubled period in which there were many reports of violations of Human rights by the military dictatorship during this government. This created a tense atmosphere at the Armed Forces, and Chiarino culminated, after a virtual insubordination of the Army Commander Hugo Medina, facing military citations for justice, with the sanction of the Law on the Expiration of the Punitive Claims of the State, in December 1986, which prevented the continuation of the legal proceedings related to this issue. Chiarino left office in November 1987 and was replaced precisely by Medina.
