= Presidency of Jorge Batlle =

Presidential administration of Uruguay

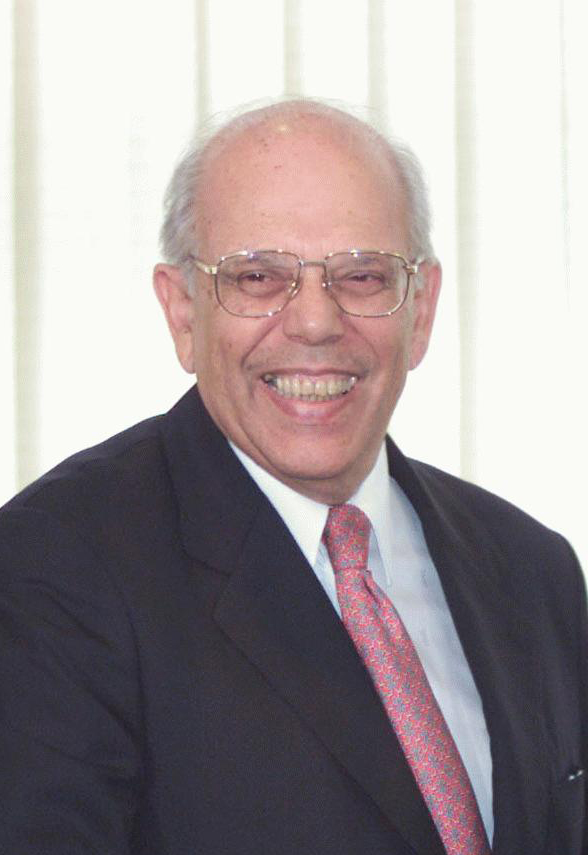
- Batlle in 2003
- Presidency of Jorge Batlle; 1 March 2000 – 1 March 2005
- President: Jorge Batlle
- Cabinet: See list
- Party: Colorado Party
- Election: 1999
- Seat: Liberty Building

The presidency of Jorge Batlle began on 1 March 2000 when he was inaugurated as the 38th president of Uruguay. Batlle, member of Colorado Party, took office following his victory over the Broad Front Party nominee Tabaré Vázquez in the second round of the 1999 general election, where his party joined to defeat Broad Front that was the winning party in the first round.

This period of government was impacted by a series of crises and controversies, including the 2002 economic crisis and the livestock foot-and-mouth disease epidemic that led to the loss of international markets, but also featured progresses on human rights after for the first time since the return of democracy began the investigations of the crimes performed during the 1973-1985 civic-military dictatorship and the establishment of the Frame Law of Environment. Internationally this period implied the alignment and closer relationship with the United States, the rupture of relations with Cuba and the seed that led to have closer relations with Finland.

== Background ==
By the first round of the general election in October, Colorado Party obtained 31.93% (703,915 votes) but lost against the Broad Front that obtained 39.06% (801,202 votes) and National Party reached 21.72% (478,980 votes), what required to run a second round between the two most voted parties to elect the presidential formula due to none reached the required turnout as the Constitution mandates after the new electoral system was established in 1996.

For the second round, the Colorado Party and the National Party agreed to make a coalition, encouraging National Party followers to vote for Colorado Party, and this ended up by granting the Colorado formula the victory over Broad Front: Jorge Batlle-Luis Hierro López obtained 54.13% (1,158,708 votes) against Tabaré Vázquez-Rodolfo Nin Novoa with 45.87% (981,778 votes), therefore winning Batlle the presidency.

== Inauguration ==
Jorge Batlle assumed as the President of the Republic, along with Luis Hierro López who took over as a vice president, the 1st March 2000, where he gave a speech referring to national unity. During his speech, he pledged to create a relief package to the agriculture sector, in economic matters promised an adjustment plan, and regarding human rights expressed his intention to start investigations to find out the location of forcibly disappeared Uruguayan people during the 1973-1985 dictatorship. On foreign affairs, expressed his will to expand Mercosur and the creation of an Inter-American free trade area. After the end of his speech, well received by their coalition partners in the National Party as well as by leaders of the opposition in Broad Front Party, he make the oath after the General Assembly as the Constitution requires and they went to the Executive seat in Liberty Building to receive the presidential sash from the outgoing president Julio María Sanguinetti.

== Cabinet ==
Office	Name	Term
President	Jorge Batlle	2000-2005
Defense	Luis Brezzo	2000-2002
Yamandú Fau	2002-2005
Economy and Finance	Alberto Bensión	2000-2002
Alejandro Atchugarry	2002-2003
Isaac Alfie	2003-2005
Education and Culture	Antonio Mercader	2000-2002
Leonardo Guzmán	2002-2004
José Amorín Batlle	2004-2005
Livestock, Agriculture and Fisheries	Gonzalo González	2000-2003
Martín Aguirrezabala	2003-2005
Industry, Energy and Mining	Sergio Abreu	2000-2002
Pedro Bordaberry	2002-2003
José Villar	2003-2005
Interior	Guillermo Stirling	2000-2004
Daniel Borrelli	2004
Alejo Fernández Cháves	2004-2005
Foreign Relations	Didier Opertti	2000-2005
Public Health	Horacio Fernández Ameglio	2000-2001
Luis Fraschini	2001-2002
Alfonso Varela	2002-2003
Conrado Bonilla	2003-2005
Labour and Social Welfare	Álvaro Alonso	2000-2002
Santiago Pérez del Castillo	2002-2005
Transport and Public Works	Lucio Cáceres	2000-2004
Gabriel Gurméndez	2004
Gabriel Pais	2004-2005
Carlos Pollio	2005
Tourism	Alfonso Varela	2000-2002
Pedro Bordaberry	2002-2005
Housing, Territorial Planning and Environment	Carlos Cat	2000-2002
Saúl Irureta	2002-2005
Sports and Youth	Jaime Trobo	2000-2002
Leonardo Guzmán	2002-2003
Pedro Bordaberry	2003-2005

=== Starting layout ===
The newly president formed his cabinet taking into account the coalition agreement with National Party. From Colorado Party, appointed Luis Brezzo for the Ministry of National Defense, Guillermo Stirling for the Ministry of the Interior, and Didier Opertti for the Ministry of Foreign Relations, all of them from Foro Batllista sector; from Lista 15 sector appointed Alberto Bensión for the Ministry of Economy and Finance, Horacio Fernández Ameglio for the Ministry of Public Health, Lucio Cáceres for the Ministry of Transport and Public Works and Alfonso Varela for the Ministry of Tourism; from other sectors of Colorado Party appointed Raúl Lago as the Secretary of the Presidency, Leonardo Costa as the Prosecretary of the Presidency and Ariel Davrieux as the Director of the Office of Planning and Budget.

From their coalition partners, the National Party, appointed Antonio Mercader for the Ministry of Education and Culture, and Carlos Cat for the Ministry of Housing, Territorial Planning and Environment, both from Herrerismo sector; from other National sectors were appointed Gonzalo González for the Ministry of Livestock, Agriculture and Fisheries, Sergio Abreu for the Ministry of Industry, Energy and Mining, and Álvaro Alonso for the Ministry of Labour and Social Welfare. After the new Ministry of Sports was created, it was appointed, also from this party, Jaime Trobo.

=== Rupture of the coalition with National Party and resignation of Nationalist ministers ===
With the economic crisis in the background, on 28 October 2002 the Board of National Party decided to remove their colleagues from the Executive, resolution that was not adopted unanimously but 9 against 6, supporting it were the Herrerism and National Alliance factions, while against it were the Wilsonist Current and some Intendants from the Uruguayan interior. The resolution accused the government of Jorge Batlle of pathological ineptitude to make decisions. The president of National Party Luis Alberto Lacalle even dared to say that Nationalists were responsible of allowing Batlle being elected and if it was possible to go backwards he would change his votes. On the other hand, those opposing this resolution argued that this was an act of irresponsibility.

This resolution was submitted to be deliberated by the National Convention of the party to decide if it would be kept, modified or revoked, scheduled for the next 3 November. The day of the meeting the Convention decided by 291 votes supporting it and 112 against it to maintain the resolution to withdraw their ministers as it was decided by the Board. This conference was held under a troublesome and hostile climate, where each band discredited and insulted the other. The factions that supported the Conventions' resolution were Herrerismo and Alianza Nacional, while against it were Desafío Nacional, Correntada Wilsonista and some Intendants from the Uruguayan interior.

On 13 November, Jorge Batlle, already aware of these series of events since the initial resolution of National Party's Board, accepted the resignation of the Nationalist ministers and appointed to replace them several politicians from Colorado Party.

== Domestic affairs ==
=== Conflicts with unions ===
During the presidential term there was a high level of trade unions' conflicts already since the beginning of the period. At a national level, before the beginning of the 2002 economic crisis, there was a protest promoted by the trade union confederation PIT-CNT with political purposes in order to counteract the economically liberal policy that was being applied by the Batlle government. This union conflict eventually led to a general strike on 31 May 2000 to protest against the Law of Urgent Consideration from that time and the denationalization of companies stated in that law, but also in other work matters such as wage improvements. This strike, with several protest around the country, had in some cases violent incidents with stonings and insults.

At a departmental level, in Montevideo raised a conflict between union ADEOM, made of Montevideo's government functionaries, and the executive branch of Montevideo led by intendant Mariano Arana, due to the parftial privatization of the urban waste disposal service.

Since 23 September, in the University of the Republic started a strike with cease of activities, promoted by docents' and functionaries' unions, also supporting it the Uruguayan Federation of University Students, in order to achieve improvements in the Udelar's budget. This strike lasted until near the year's end when the strike was terminated by the students, without achieving most of what they wanted in the next Budget Law.

=== Environment and climate change ===
==== Progress on environmental policy ====
Regarding the environmental policy a new Frame Law on Environment No. 17,823 of 28 November 2000 was passed, extending the provisions from Constitution's article 47 as a way to fill the unregulated matters on the subject. The law draft was based on the previous work from the previous legislative period by technicians, non-governmental organizations, the Uruguayan Chamber of Industries and the University of the Republic. The goal of this law was to proclaim the environment as a general interest matter, to promote its protection, the preservation of biodiversity, the prevention and mitigation of the harmful consequences of climate change on the environment as well as the proper and regulated management of toxic or dangerous materials and waste, and also the regional and international cooperation on environment.

It acknowledged the right of the inhabitants of the Republic to be protected in a healthy and balanced environment, in addition to the duty of individuals and organizations to abstain from doing any act with grievous consequences on the environment. Moreover, the Government and other state organizations must protect the environment, to perform recovery operations or demand others to do so in the case of environment damage and to promote an environmentally sustainable development model, being that the one which fulfills the needs of the current generation without endangering the ability of future generations to fulfill their own. State organizations must also promote education on environment.

It also set as a priority to create a nacional policy on environment and sustainable development. The law make the Ministry of Housing, Territorial Planning and Environment responsible for the coordination of the environmental management and to perform a yearly environment report. The law also enabled this Ministry to delegate tasks to departments' governments.

The law not only foresaw general aspects but also included special provisions related to the ozone layer, climate change, chemical substances, trash and biosecurity. Among them, it banned the emissions of substances or energies that put the human, biodiversity or environmental health into risk, in violation of the regulations on environment limits established by the authorities. It also provided that the Ministry would regulate the limits in production, trade and usage of substances that harm the ozone layer.

The parliamentary process was relatively fast: the law was passed in just seven months and almost unanimously in the full political spectrum. However, there was a specific issue that arose controversies: information on environment. Two members of parliament from the Colorado Party (Pais and Bergstein) raised their objections that any person could access to information on environment that emerged from reports, claiming that this would be excessive and obstructing, meanwhile from the opposition in Broad Front party they defended the free access to this kind of information, in order to democratize the discussion on environment. At the end the article was left intact, providing that any interested person could access the information. Another controversial aspect was the obligation of the Ministry to send copies of the yearly report to the General Assembly and to non governmental organizations that, according to Bergstein, in the first case it was not appropriate and in the latter was not clear if it had to be sent to some or every NGO. Finally the provision suppressed the obligation to send copies of the reports to NGOs, but added the mention of the departmental governments.

==== Environmental lead pollution and cases of lead poisoning ====
In 2001 was discovered the existence of a substantial lead pollution in La Teja neighbourhood of Montevideo city, after symptoms of anemia and headaches in minors of the neighbourhood that make their parents to ask for medical tests, whose results revealed they were poisoned by lead. The poisoning by lead or saturnism affects most of the organs and systems of the body as the lead is neurotoxic. In the area, where there were living several poor families in slums, there were detected very high levels of pollution in the ground, in a flood-prone land, that in turn there was nearby water heavily polluted by a closed metallurgical company and the state petrol company ANCAP. A team with technicians and authorities led by the Ministry of Public Health was established to deal with the situation, after there were strong social demands due to the government initial stagnation and lack of public answers. The affected families also began to publicly protest asking to be relocated.

=== Livestock foot-and-mouth epidemic crisis ===
Uruguay was a FMD-free without vaccination, but on 25 November 2000 a FMD outbreak was detected in the rural settlement paraje del Chiflero, Artigas Department, that resulted in border closures in Argentina and Brazil for meat from Uruguay, the halt of overseas exports and foreign slaughterhouses refusing to accept Uruguayan meat. This meant the loss of important markets with the already lost Mexican market when this country refused to accept Uruguayan meat around September when the disease had not entered Uruguay yet but there were outbreaks in Argentina and Brazil. The government ordered as an emergency measure a policy of "sanitary rifle", killing over 5000 animals, temporarily containing the outbreak. By then Uruguay already had lost the FMD-free without vaccination distinction that is desiderable to get the best access to international markets.

However, in May 2001 another FMD outbreak arose, therefore the government decided to start a massive vaccination campaign. The epidemic brought itself with serious economic and social consequences: the livestock relocation was banned in the whole country, the slaughters and exports of any meat product and the sport hunting were also banned as well. Containers in transit with Uruguayan meat already sold were returned to Uruguay as they were rejected. Due to the loss of markets, thousands of slaughterhouses' workers went to unemployment insurance and there were financial issues with the payment chain of livestock industry. The agricultural fairs with livestock were suspended, and the courses in education institutions including primary, secondary, vocational and teacher education centers were temporarily suspended in several departments.

=== Human rights ===
==== Commission for the Peace ====
President Batlle in resolution 858/000 of 9 August 2000 ordered the creation of the Commission for the Peace, a public research body on human rights matters, part of the Presidential Office, with the goal of finding out the location of the victims of forced disappearances during the civic-military dictatorship of 1973–1985, as well as the location of the minors disappeared during that regime, in order to give a closure to the situation and reach peace among Uruguayans. To fulfil this goal, the commission was granted powers to receive, classify, collect and analyze information about forced disappearances occurred during the dictatorship, and after the end of the research it should write and publish a final report with conclusions about the denunciations of forced disappearances it received and if considered appropriate to suggest legal measures or reparations to take. It was formed by priests Nicolás Cotugno and Luis Pérez Aguirre, unionist José D'Elía, and attorneys José Claudio Williman, Gonzalo Fernández and Carlos Ramela.

The Commission raised its report on 10 April 2003 to the Executive, which accepted it completely as the official version of what happened to the forcibly disappeared persons during the dictatorship. In the report the Commission questioned how the dictatorship acted and that the forcibly disappeared people were killed even after the leftist guerrilla was already defeated. It mentioned that the government agents of the regime acted in their functions outside the legal framework when they used torture, illegal detention and forced disappearance, using illegal repressive methods.

Part of the report was publicly questioned, among other reasons, because of the reference of 24 cases of disappearances since 1973 whose remains would have been exhumed at the end of 1984, cremated and thrown at the River Plate, but this claim was later proved to be wrong. Jorge Errandonea also suggested that the Commission did not have enough material, human or legal resources to perform proper researches, neither had inquiring powers to perform coercion on the individuals who supposedly retained the information. About the goal of granting peace and a closure, he mentioned that actually what was tried to accomplish was a public responsibility, not a moral duty.

The Commission for the Peace at the end decisively contributed to destigmatize the human rights topic on the public agenda, and rather than giving a "closure" the issue of human rights violations during the dictatorship as Batlle intended, it instead set the basis to establish itself into the political and mediatical agenda of its time, as well as to help including all social and political sectors to the commission. It vaguely suggested the need to educate and promote a human rights culture and the rule of law, in addition to recommend the ratification of international treaties and conventions on human rights and to check the domestic laws in force to take into account crimes against humanity such as torture, genocide or forced disappearance, already regulated in foreign national laws, everything to prevent these incidents never happen again.

==== Discovery of kidnapped relatives of forcibly disappeared people ====
On 31 March president Batlle announced after a research the granddaughter of Argentine poet Juan Gelman was found, that she was kidnapped after birth during the dictatorship period. Juan Gelman met with Batlle and talked about the issue in a press conference. ADN analysis later confirmed the identity of Macarena Gelman as the missing granddaughter of Juan Gelman.

=== Taxation policy ===
The period 2000-2003 featured a series of fiscal reforms where the rates of value added taxes were raised and reached highest ever rates in the Individual Income Tax (IRP).

Most of the changes, done to deal with the recession and economic crisis, mostly hit on the people who receive fixed income and pay IRP, Value Added Tax (IVA), Internal Specific Tax (IMESI), and so on. However, a specific feature of his economically liberal ideology was on to expand reductions to taxes of employer payments for social welfare of workers of certain groups such as the agricultural, industry and transport, besides of to exempt from Property Tax (IP) to the agricultural market, with the reasoning of boosting the economic activity of the companies and thus creating more employment positions.

== Foreign affairs ==
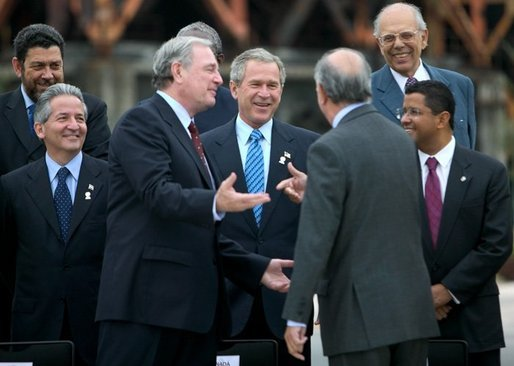
Jorge Batlle and other foreign politicians during the Special Summit of the Americas in Monterrey, México, January 2004.

=== Rupture of relations with Cuba ===
In April 2002, president Batlle announced that he would broke diplomatic relations with Cuba after some incidents that occurred with the Cuban president Fidel Castro. This rupture originated from the proposal of resolution on the situation of human rights on Cuba submitted by Uruguay to be considered before the United Nations' Human Rights Commission, which asked Cuban government to improve the human rights of Cubans, but Castro in response to this called Batlle as "haggard and a wretched Judas", and said that "no one will remember him [Batlle] in eight or ten years". The resolution was then approved, and Raúl Castro, his brother, said that Uruguay "was assigned the task of licking the boots of the empire".

Since mid-2021, Uruguay adopted a stance where it condemned the violation of human rights in Cuba but at the same time opposed the United States' embargo on Cuba and other economic sanctions. At the International Conference on Financing for Development in Monterrey, Batlle said about Cuba that "it has been using the same economic theories for 44 years by which is, notoriously, going through a hard time", and later, he condemned the situation of the human rights in that country, in addition to say that it was not a democracy. In April of that year, Cuba's foreign minister Felipe Pérez Roque branded Uruguay as "kneeling and servile", saying that the country had exchanged its vote at the UN for meat sales. Due to these statements, Uruguay's foreign minister Didier Opertti with Enrique Estrázulas, ambassador of Uruguay before Cuba, gave him a deadline to retract himself. At that time, the Uruguayan authorities began working on a resolution draft on the situation of human rights in Cuba and to allow the entry of international observers to the island. Uruguay then promoted at the Summit of Heads of State of Rio Group the approval of the resolution, where it was appreciated "Cuban efforts [in matter of] social rights of the population, despite an adverse international environment" and asked the Cuban government to further advance in the observance of human rights.

=== Strengthening of relationship with the United States ===
During this administration, Uruguay's relationship with the United States grew together. Batlle met president George W. Bush in 2001, when the United States president thanked him for the help with a situation with China that arose during the visit of the president of China Jiang Zemin to Uruguay, during which Batlle spoke with Jiang in German. During the conversation, the Chinese statesman told Batlle that he had a problem to solve with Bush, referring to the incident of the island of Hainan where a United States' spy plane crashed against a Chinese military plane, that made the latter fall, and after that the American aircraft landed without answering the warnings made by the Chinese air operators, and because of that the 24 crew members of the American aircraft were arrested. This led Bush to request the release of the American military crew. Batlle suggested that the negotiations should start from Bush's father, George H. W. Bush, so that through him would reach better to his son. From then on, a dialogue between the two countries began to resolve the situation.

During the Third Summit of the Americas, Batlle strongly defended the deployment of the Free Trade Area of the Americas in order to achieve free trade between the member countries, raising with a sense of urgency that the sooner is established, the better.

== Controversies ==
=== Bloomberg scandal, or declarations of Batlle on the Argentines ===
On 3 June 2002 was revealed in Argentine television that during an interview with journalists Martín Boerr and David Plumb of Bloomberg network, held on 30 May and recorded in Liberty Building —seat of the Executive—, president Batlle made controversial statements regarding the Argentines. These controversial statements were expressed during the talk Batlle was having with Boerr after the end of the interview he was performing, that due to their nature, was not intended to be recorded. Although an official from Presidential Office asked the cameraman if the camera was already turned off, the cameraman said that it was turned off and that they do not record off-the-record talks, however the camera was still recording. The camera then recorded the conversation, with controversial comments regarding Argentine politicians:

Dear friend, in 2001 the situation of Argentina [is related to] Argentine problems. [They are] a bunch of thieves from first to last! Do you understand? As Mr. Barrionuevo said: "if we stop stealing for two years, we will be better". Now, don't compare Argentina against Uruguay! Or are you a complete ignorant of the reality of Argentina and the reality of Uruguay? Do you know how things are handled in Argentina? Do you know the kind, volume and scale of corruption in Argentina?

— Jorge Batlle

and also about the then interim president of Argentina, Eduardo Duhalde:

But how could I suggest Duhalde anything, my dear? I can't suggest Duhalde anything. He doesn't have any political influence, he doesn't know where he's going to. How could I suggest Duhalde anything?

— Jorge Batlle

The recording quickly was viralized and soon there were repercussions in public sphere of Argentina and criticism from the political parties in opposition in Uruguay. The president of Argentina demanded an appointment the ambassador of Uruguay in Argentina asking for explanations. Batlle realized about the mistake he committed and gave apologies via phone call, but Duhalde demanded the apologies to be performed personally in Buenos Aires. Batlle then gave a press conference in Liberty Building where he told his reasons and the next day he travelled to Quinta de Olivos in Buenos Aires to meet Duhalde. During this public meeting Batlle repeatedly apologized for what he said, claiming that their comments were made because he was "driven crazy" and angered during a time when Uruguay was at the edge of falling into a crisis, and ended his speech visibly touched. After that, president Duhalde, stiff during the whole meeting, said that the incident was brought to an end and greeted Batlle.

== Opinion polling ==
Approval rating of Jorge Batlle presidency.
Source: Interconsult

From very early in Batlle's presidency until late 2001 an opinion poll from Interconsult found that Batlle's approval rating was high, where the public opinion regarding the Batlle's administration was well received with a 58% around 2000, but this could be explained due to political reasons such as the progress on human rights agenda with the creation of the Commission for the Peace, his liberal view regarding the aperture to the world rather than protectionism in some developed countries, or even due to how he was viewed as politician, even though Uruguayan economy was not performing well and was under recession since 1998. However, this economic decline started to be notorious since the end of 2001, and because of that the approval rating began to decline.

The approval rating of Batlle's presidency then steadily declined by February 2002, with a strong fall in June 2002 during the worst of the economic crisis, ending 2002 with a score of 15%. At the same time the disapproval rate increased from 25% to 60%. By 2003, when there were signs of economic recovery, the approval rating has a little bump up, reaching 17% by August 2003 (against 56% of disapproval and 27% rating it as "average").

By 2004 approval rating began to decline again, falling 4% and with increase of disapproval, what could be explained due to the elections' campaigns occurring that time. During the most intense period of campaigning the approval rating reached 5%, partly because the Colorado Party by then had lost a substantial part of its voters, and also because of the opposition' discourses, by National and Frente Amplio candidates, as well as the population opinion was to attribute the government as the responsible of the 2002 economic crisis, but attribute the following economic recovery as caused by external factors. By December 2004, at the end of the election campaign, the approval increased up to 16%, near the end of the presidential term.

== See also ==
- South American economic crisis of 2002

== Documentary ==
- Jorge Batlle: entre el cielo y el infierno. A 2024 documentary directed by Federico Lemos.

== Bibliography ==
- Maiztegui Casas, Lincoln R. (2016). Orientales: una historia política del Uruguay (in Spanish). Vol. 12. Montevideo: Editorial Planeta. ISBN 978-9974-737-51-8.
- Paolillo, Claudio (2016). Con los días contados (in Spanish) (2° ed.). Montevideo: Editorial Fin de Siglo. ISBN 978-9974-49-320-9.
