= Brezzo =

Brezzo may refer to:

- Brezzo di Bedero, municipality in the Province of Varese, Italy
- Luis Brezzo, Uruguayan politician
- Thomas Brezzo, Monegasque lawyer and politician
