= Alberto Zumarán =

Uruguayan politician (1940–2020)

Alberto Sáenz de Zumarán Ortiz de Taranco, known as Alberto Zumarán (10 October 1940 – 4 August 2020) was a Uruguayan lawyer and politician, belonging to the National Party.

Zumarán was born in Montevideo, the son of José María Sáenz de Zumarán Arocena and Isabel Ortiz de Taranco y García de Zúñiga. He married Angelita Aguerre Cat and they had five children: Virginia, Magdalena, Adriana, Alejandro, and Santiago.

At the end of the civic-military dictatorship, National Party leader Wilson Ferreira Aldunate was banned and jailed. Thus Zumaran was an important presidential candidate in the 1984 election. After Ferreira Aldunate died, Zumaran was designated his political heir, so once again he ran as presidential candidate in the 1989 election. On both occasions he was elected to the Senate.
