= Ariel Davrieux =

Uruguayan accountant, economist and politician

Ariel Davrieux is a Uruguayan accountant, economist and politician. A man of the Colorado Party, he held the post of Head of the Uruguayan Office of Planning and Budgeting for 15 years, during both presidential terms of Julio María Sanguinetti and that of Jorge Batlle.
