= Addiego =

Addiego is a surname. Notable people with the surname include:

- Dawn Addiego (born 1962), American politician
- Rafael Addiego Bruno (1923–2014), Uruguayan lawyer, judge, and politician
