= Ibero Gutiérrez =

Uruguayan poet, writer, artist, and political activist (1949–1972)

Ibero Gutiérrez González
- Born: Ibero Gutiérrez González; 1949; Montevideo, Uruguay
- Died: February 28, 1972 (aged 22–23); Montevideo, Uruguay
- Education: Universidad de la República
- Known for: Poetry, Visual Arts, Activism
- Movement: Counterculture, Political Art

Ibero Gutiérrez González (1949 – 28 February 1972) was a Uruguayan poet, writer, artist, and political activist. He was a student at the Universidad de la República and was known for his involvement in left-wing activism during a time of increasing political repression in Uruguay. Gutiérrez was assassinated in 1972, becoming one of the first victims of state terrorism in the country. His artistic and literary legacy remains influential in Uruguayan culture.

== Early life and education ==
Ibero Gutiérrez was born in 1949 in Uruguay. He pursued higher education at the Universidad de la República, where he studied humanities and social sciences. During his time at the university, he became deeply engaged in political activism, particularly in left-wing movements that opposed the increasingly authoritarian rule of the Uruguayan government in the late 1960s and early 1970s.

In addition to his political involvement, Gutiérrez was passionate about literature, poetry, and visual arts. He was known for his experimental writing, visual collages, and an artistic approach influenced by the counterculture of the 1960s. His work often reflected themes of freedom, social justice, and resistance to oppression.

== Political Activism and Persecution ==
During the late 1960s, Uruguay experienced growing political turmoil, with increasing state repression against left-wing groups and student activists. Gutiérrez became involved in political resistance and was closely monitored by security forces. His activism aligned with socialist and revolutionary ideals, which made him a target for the military and police forces cracking down on dissent.

On 28 February 1972, Gutiérrez was abducted and later found murdered, his body showing signs of torture. His assassination marked a turning point in Uruguay's descent into state-sponsored violence, which intensified with the military dictatorship that took full control of the country in 1973. His killing was attributed to paramilitary forces linked to the government and is widely considered an early example of state terrorism in Uruguay.

== Literary and Artistic Legacy ==
Although his life was cut short at the age of 22, Gutiérrez left behind a significant body of work, including poetry, essays, and visual art. His writings and artistic creations have been posthumously compiled and analyzed for their philosophical depth and political engagement. His work remains a symbol of resistance against oppression and is often referenced in discussions about Uruguay's history of state violence.

In 2015, the book Exploración de la libertad: Ibero Gutiérrez by Luis Bravo was published, providing an in-depth analysis of his work and its enduring impact on Uruguayan culture and history.

== Posthumous Recognition ==
Decades after his death, Gutiérrez's legacy continues to be honored. His writings have been preserved and studied in academic and literary circles. His story is also referenced in broader discussions on human rights violations during Uruguay's military dictatorship (1973–1985).

Exhibitions and literary compilations have contributed to keeping his memory alive, reinforcing his status as a martyr of Uruguay's struggle for democracy and freedom.

On the anniversary of his death, various cultural and political organizations in Uruguay hold events commemorating his life, emphasizing his contributions to literature, art, and the fight against repression.

== See also ==
- Civic-military dictatorship of Uruguay
