= Alberto Candeau =

Uruguayan actor and writer

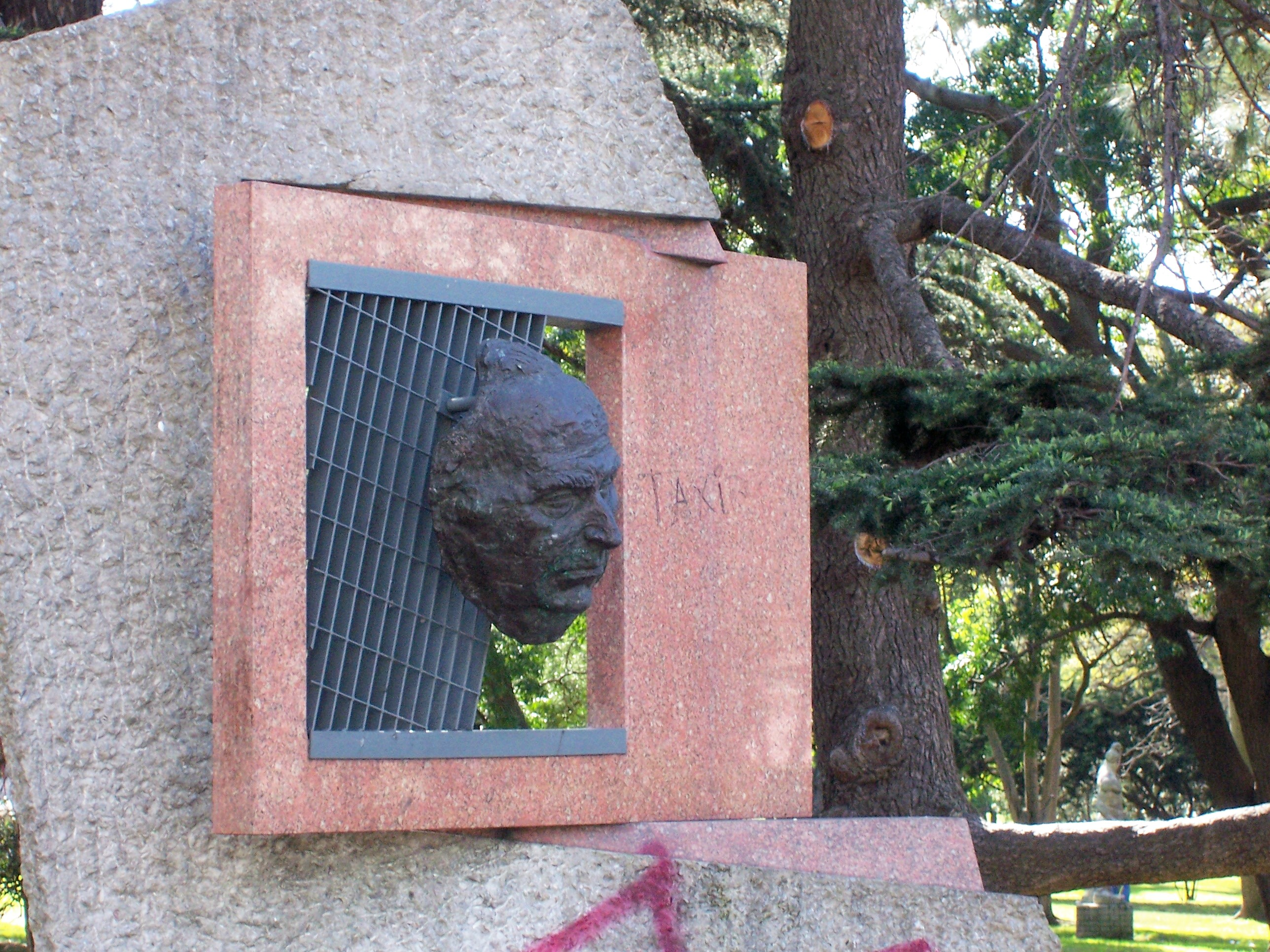
Alberto Candeau

Alberto Candeau (October 11, 1910 - January 22, 1990) was a famous Uruguayan actor and writer.

== Biography ==
Candeau was born in the Ciudad Vieja neighborhood of Montevideo, spending his childhood and adolescence in the Reducto neighborhood.

His beginnings as a theater actor were in the Montevideo company of Carlos Brussa. In 1947 he joined the founding group of the Comedia Nacional, and remained a cast member until the day of his death, being one of its most important actors and directors.

=== Acting & Directing ===
Candeau was also a celebrated theater actor, earning him multiple awards from the Circle of Critics, the Association of Theater Critics of Uruguay and the Casa Del Teatros. In Uruguay and Buenos Aires, his interpretation of Galileo Galilei is still remembered.

In the cinema he participated in the Uruguayan films The Little Hero of the Arroyo de Oro and Ladrón de Sueños and the Argentinian films El Candida and Bloody Pleasure. Candeau also had incursions into the radio theater and television.

He was also a prolific theater director, staging seventeen shows between 1955 and 1985, of which sixteen were shown through the Comedia Nacional, and one to Teatro El Galpón. Of these works, the Villa de Gardel by Víctor Manuel Leites, Processed 1040 by Juan Carlos Patron and Awakens and sings by Clifford Odets stand out. He also chaired the Bertolt Brecht House in Montevideo, through which he disseminated Brecht's works in different rooms in Uruguay.

=== Books ===
In 1980 he wrote the novel Every night is a premiere, co-authored with Carlos Mendive, about his experiences as an actor and theater director.

He was also the author, in collaboration with Juan Carlos Patrón, of two musical works: Do the street and Prontuariado with music by Eduardo Etchegoncelhay.

=== Political activism ===
He was the speaker at the 1983 pro-democracy demonstration held against the civic-military dictatorship. Between 1987 and 1989, Candeau joined the "National Commission Pro Referendum", constituted to revoke the "Law on the Expiration of the Punitive Claims of the State", enacted in December 1986 to prevent the prosecution of crimes committed during the military dictatorship in his country ( 1973–1985).

== Selected filmography & Discography. ==
- The Candidate (1959)
- The admirable alarm. 1811 (next to César Salsamendi)
- The old country. First part 1812-1814 (with César Salsamendi)
- The old country. Second part 1815-1816 (with Daniel Viglietti)
- The old country. Third part 1817-1820 (with Daniel Viglietti)
- Verses of arrabal and lunfardo (with Eduardo Galian)
- Alberto Candeau and Estela Castro (with Estela Castro)
- Chronicle of free men (next to Tabaré Etcheverry in 1972. Sondor . Recorded in 1972 and edited in 1984.)

== Spanish Page ==
- Alberto Candeau
