= José D'Elía =

Uruguayan labor leader and politician (1916–2007)

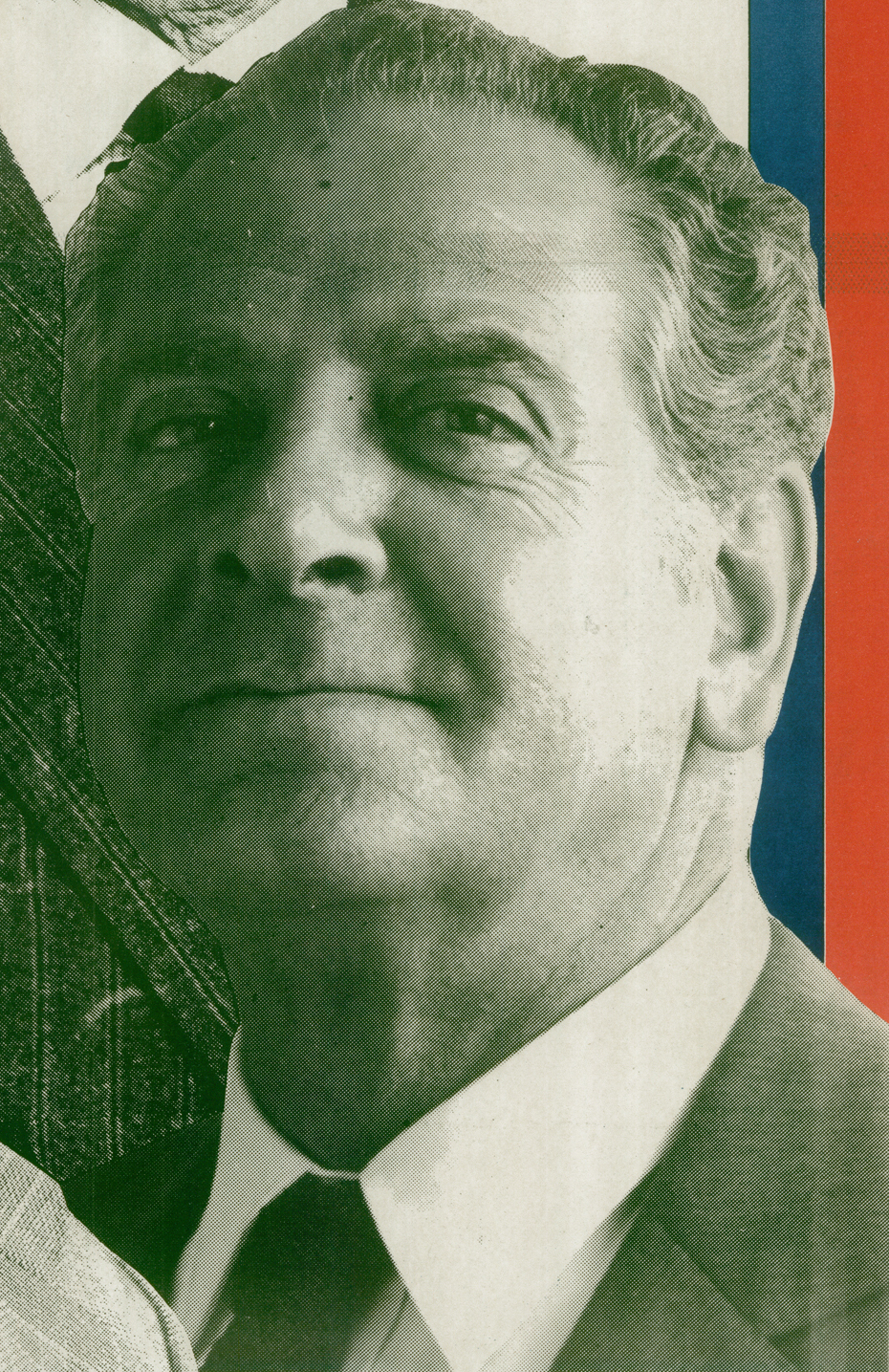
José D'Elía

José D'Elía (21 June 1916 - 29 January 2007) was a Uruguayan labor leader and politician.

== Biography ==
Born in Treinta y Tres, D'Elía worked as a shop employee and from his youth onwards he took part in the trade union movement. In 1942, he participated in the foundation of the General Union of Workers (UGT), and was the general secretary. Three years later, he participated in the creation of the Worldwide Labor Union Federation. Between 1964 and 1966, he was a fundamental factor in the unification of the Uruguayan labor movement, which resulted in the creation of the Workers National Central (CNT), whose first president was D'Elía.

A Socialist Party member from his youth, D'Elía supported the creation of the Frente Amplio in 1971. In the 1984 elections, which marked the end of the dictatorship begun in 1973, D'Elía was the vice presidential candidate of his party alongside presidential candidate Juan José Crottogini. The pair received 21.3% of the vote, finishing in third place.

In 1993, he resigned from the Presidency of the CNT (since 1984, PIT-CNT) and was granted the title of Honorary President.

His last public appearance was between 2000 and 2003, when he took part in the Peace Commission, which investigated the whereabouts of those who disappeared under the military dictatorship in the 1970s.

He died in 2007. His remains are buried at Cementerio del Norte, Montevideo.
