= 1980 Uruguayan constitutional referendum =

- 30 November 1980

Results
| Choice | Votes | % |
|---|---|---|
| Yes | 707,118 | 42.51% |
| No | 945,176 | 56.83% |
| Blank votes | 10,980 | 0.66% |
| Valid votes | 1,663,274 | 98.45% |
| Invalid votes | 26,150 | 1.55% |
| Total votes | 1,689,424 | 100.00% |
| Registered voters/turnout | 1,944,951 | 86.86% |
- Results by department

A constitutional referendum was held in Uruguay on 30 November 1980 to decide whether to approve the new constitution drafted by the military dictatorship that had ruled Uruguay since 1973. The new constitution would have institutionalized a political system with a strong political role for the Armed Forces and reduced the powers of Parliament and political parties.

Even though the electoral process was stained by press censorship, the restriction of political activities and opposition leaders being barred from political participation, it was ultimately rejected by voters by 56.83 percent against 42.51. The result was significant because the military government had expected approval. It demonstrated substantial opposition to the dictatorship and forced it to begin moving toward a return to democratic rule, kickstarting a transitional period that ended with the 1984 Uruguayan general election where a democratically elected president was chosen.

== Background ==
A military coup in 1973 had led to a civic-military dictatorship. In 1976 the military government issued a series of constitutional decrees that amended the 1967 constitution by creating the Council of the Nation (Consejo de la Nación) to serve as the supreme governmental body, with executive and legislative functions. It consisted of the 30 members of the Council of State (a body created by the regime in June 1973 to act in lieu of the General Assembly, which was dissolved by the regime and the 28 senior officers of the armed forces (sixteen from the army, six from the navy, and six from the air force). The Council of the Nation appointed the President and the members of the Council of State, the Supreme Court of Justice, and the Tribunal of Administrative Claims. Eight institutional acts substituted for many of the functional provisions and guarantees of the 1967 constitution. The Council of the Nation was given the power to appoint the President and to set general policy for the country. In addition, institutional acts deprived previous officeholders and candidates of their political rights and permitted the arbitrary dismissal of public employees.

Under the 1976 constitutional amendments, the President exercised executive power, acting with the concurrence of one or more ministers as appropriate or with the National Security Council (Consejo de Seguridad Nacional, COSENA). The COSENA was formed in 1973 and consisted of the commanders of the army, navy, and air force, with an additional senior military officer, and the ministers of national defense, interior, and foreign affairs. It participated in any decision related to the "national security" or in any formulation of overall plans or objectives.

The constitutional decrees declared generally that the maintenance of the national security was of "exclusive competence," or the sole prerogative, of the armed forces, and also deprived local governments of all budgetary powers. The Council of State continued to pass laws that the executive normally would have submitted for approval. Only the executive could initiate the procedure for approval of legislation on budgetary or other matters that could be related in any way to national security. The decrees also created the Ministry of Justice, responsible for relations between the executive and judicial powers.

== New constitution ==
In 1980 the military regime drew up a constitution that would have provided for a strong, continuing role for the military along the lines of the 1976 constitutional decrees, including legitimising the COSENA's new role. The document also would have greatly reduced the roles of the General Assembly and political parties.

== Results ==
| Choice | Votes | % |
|---|---|---|
| For | 707,118 | 42.80 |
| Against | 945,176 | 57.20 |
| Invalid/blank votes | 37,130 | – |
| Total | 1,689,424 | 100 |
| Registered voters/turnout | 1,944,951 | 86.86 |
Source: Direct Democracy

== Aftermath ==
Despite the rejection by voters, a new 35 member Council of State was installed on 20 August 1981, before President Gregorio Conrado Álvarez took office. Its powers were expanded to include responsibility for calling a constitutional assembly, referendums, and general elections.
