= Carlos Julio Pereyra =

Uruguayan politician (1922–2020)

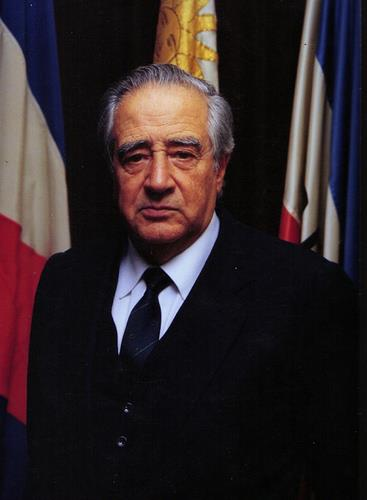
Carlos Julio Pereyra.

Carlos Julio Pereyra Pereyra (15 November 1922 – 9 February 2020) was a Uruguayan schoolteacher, author and politician belonging to the National Party.

Pereyra was born in Rocha. He had a long political career, serving as representative and longtime senator. In the 1971 elections he was the running mate of Wilson Ferreira Aldunate. Soon afterwards Pereyra was an underground leader of his party during the civic-military dictatorship. Once again elected senator in 1984, he ran for president in the 1989 and 1994 elections. He died in Montevideo, aged 97.
