= Obelisk of Montevideo =

Coordinates: 34.8975°S 56.1644°W

Obelisco a los Constituyentes
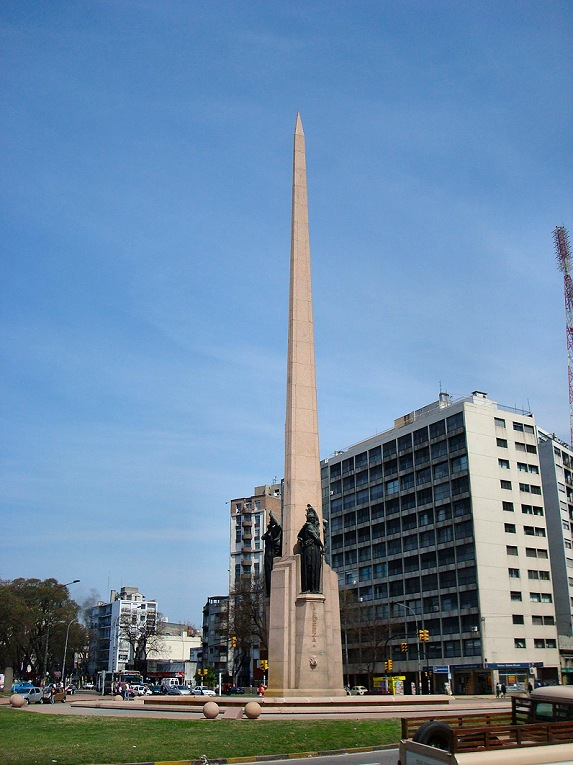
- Artist: José Luis Zorrilla de San Martín
- Year: 1938 (inauguration)
- Type: Granite and bronze
- Location: Montevideo

The Obelisk of Montevideo, officially Obelisk to the Constituents of 1830 (Spanish: Obelisco a los Constituyentes de 1830) is a monument created by sculptor José Luis Zorrilla de San Martín (1891-1975). It is a three-sided obelisk made of granite, 40 metres (130 ft) tall with three bronze statues on its sides, representing "Law", "Liberty" and "Force". It has a hexagonal water fountain around it with six spheres on its outer circumference. It is located at the intersection of 18 de Julio and Artigas Boulevard avenues, in Montevideo, at the entrance of the Parque Batlle area. It was built in 1930 to celebrate the 100th anniversary of the first Constitution of Uruguay and is an homage to the participants of the General Assembly of the first Constitution.

Six years later, a similar but larger monument was built at the intersection of 9 de Julio and Corrientes avenues in Buenos Aires, to celebrate the 400th anniversary of the first founding of the city.

In 1983 it was the site of the largest demonstration in the history of the country, the Río de Libertad. It demanded the end of the civil-military dictatorship.

== See also ==
- 18 de Julio Avenue
- Artigas Boulevard
- Parque Batlle
- Constitution of Uruguay
