= Leslie H. Close-Pozzo =

Uruguayan diplomat

Leslie H. Close Pozzo

Ambassador of Uruguay to Czechoslovakia
- In office January 1967 – June 28, 1972
- Preceded by: Marcos Brondi
- Succeeded by: Oscar Maria Infantozzi Soba

Ambassador of Uruguay to East Germany
- In office June 27, 1986 – October 3, 1990
- Preceded by: Alfredo Dupetit Ibarra
- Succeeded by: Pedro Vidal Salaberry

Personal details
- Born: 1916

Leslie H. Close-Pozzo (born 1916) was a Uruguayan Ambassador.

- Till March 1957 he was first secretary at the Uruguayan Embassy in London.
- From March 1957 to January 1967 he was first secretary of the uruguayan embassy in Moscow.
- From January 1967 to June 28, 1972 he was Ambassador in Prague.
- From June 27, 1986 to October 3, 1990 he was Ambassador in East Berlin.
