= Jorge Batlle: entre el cielo y el infierno =

2024 Uruguayan documentary film

- Directed by: Federico Lemos
- Written by: Federico Lemos
- Narrated by: Gerardo Caetano
- Production companies: Medio & Medio Films
- Release date: 2024
- Running time: 90 minutes
- Country: Uruguay
- Language: Spanish

Jorge Batlle: entre el cielo y el infierno (lit. 'Jorge Batlle: Between Heaven and Hell') is a 2024 Uruguayan documentary filmed and directed by Federico Lemos. It compiles the life of Uruguayan lawyer, journalist and politician Jorge Batlle Ibáñez (1927–2016); in particular, it displays the historical, political, economic and social events that took place during his presidency (1 March 2000 to 1 March 2005), with special emphasis on the 2002 crisis.

Living presidents Julio María Sanguinetti, Luis Alberto Lacalle Herrera and José Mujica contribute extensively to this film, as well as notable economists such as Danilo Astori, Alberto Couriel and Alberto Bensión, First Lady Mercedes Menafra, and many former cabinet members, collaborators and witnesses.
