= Operation Thirty Hours =

Planned invasion of Uruguay by Brazil in 1971

Operation Thirty Hours (Portuguese: Operação Trinta Horas) was a Brazilian military plan to invade Uruguay in 1971. Brazil was under a military dictatorship, governed by Emílio Garrastazu Médici. During that time Uruguay was in an electoral process and the possibility of victory by the left-wing Frente Amplio (Broad Front) frightened both the Brazilian rulers and the Tupamaros, an Uruguayan urban guerrilla group. However, the Broad Front was defeated at the polls and the plan was cancelled.
