= Wilson Ferreira Aldunate =

Uruguayan politician

Wilson Ferreira Aldunate (1919–1988) was a Uruguayan politician and a historically important member of the National Party.

== Biography ==
He was Minister of Agriculture during the second National Council of Government (Uruguay) with Blanco majority (1963–1967).

As a Senator he led the Por la Patria faction and made weekly radio addresses. He was among the more liberal members of his party and a fierce opposer of President Jorge Pacheco Areco.

He ran for president in the 1971 elections, with Carlos Julio Pereyra as running mate. He won the most votes of any candidate, finishing over 60,000 votes ahead of runner-up Juan Maria Bordaberry of the Colorado Party. However, under the Ley de Lemas system in effect at the time, Bordaberry won the presidency because the combined Colorado vote exceeded the combined National vote by just over 12,800 votes.

After the 1973 Uruguayan coup d'etat he had conflicts with the Civic-military dictatorship of Uruguay and was a leading non-Leftist to flee to Buenos Aires. He opposed the dictatorship from his exile in many countries; in 1976 he addressed the US Senate, denouncing human right abuses in his country and asking for a stop of US military aid to Uruguay.

On June 16, 1984, he returned to Uruguay only to be arrested, which led to protests in Latin America and Spain. As well as protests at home where his party wanted his release. He was released five days after the presidential election; the first thing he did when addressing the crowds was to offer "governability" to the new democratic government. The most critical moment was on the occasion of the parliamentary discussion and passing of the controversial Expiry Law, which Ferreira supported.

He died of cancer in 1988. On his death President Julio María Sanguinetti said "He lived as a gladiator and died a messenger of peace."

He is buried at Cementerio del Buceo, Montevideo.
