= 1971 Uruguayan referendum =

- 28 November 1971

Immediate re-election of the President
For	29.55%
Against	70.45%

Presidential obligation to resign
For	0.11%
Against	99.89%

A double referendum was held in Uruguay on 28 November 1971 alongside general elections. Voters were asked whether they approved of two proposals; one to allow presidents to seek immediate re-election for a second term, and one that would force the President to resign if any government ministers were found guilty of violating the law. Both were rejected by voters.

== Proposals ==
The proposal to allow Presidents to seek immediate re-election for a second term was put forward by the Battlista faction of the Colorado Party in the General Assembly. It had been inspired by the Unión Nacional Reeleccionista supporting President Jorge Pacheco Areco.

The proposal to force the President to resign if any government minister was found guilty of violating the law was put forward a popular initiative.

== Results ==
=== Immediate re-election ===
Choice	Votes	%
For	491,680	28.25
Against	1,248,439	71.75
Total	1,740,119	100
Registered voters/turnout	1,875,660	92.65
Source: www.sudd.ch/event.php?lang=en&id=uy0119712%3DDirect+Democracy

=== Presidential resignation ===
Choice	Votes	%
For	1,870	0.10
Against	1,738,249	99.90
Total	1,740,119	100
Registered voters/turnout	1,875,660	92.65
Source: Direct Democracy
