= Luis Brezzo =

Uruguayan politician (1939–2002)

Luiz Brezzo
- Born: March 30, 1939
- Died: September 20, 2002

Luis Brezzo Paredes(March 30, 1939 – September 20, 2002) was a Uruguayan politician belonging to the Colorado party. He was born in Montevideo, Uruguay on March 20, 1939, and studied engineering. He was employed in the banking sector, worked as a journalist, and was director of the Uruguay Association of Bank Employees (AEBU).

In 1994 and 1999 he was elected to the Senate of Uruguay. In 2000 president Jorge Batlle named him Minister of National Defense, where he served until his death on September 20, 2002.
