= Rafael Addiego Bruno =

Uruguayan jurist and political figure (1923–2014)

Rafael Addiego

President of Uruguay Acting
- In office February 12, 1985 – March 1, 1985
- Preceded by: Gregorio Conrado Álvarez
- Succeeded by: Julio María Sanguinetti

Minister of the Supreme Court
- In office 20 January 1984 – 23 February 1993
- Nominated by: Gregorio Conrado Álvarez
- Preceded by: José Pedro Gatto de Souza
- Succeeded by: Juan Mariño Chiarlone

Personal details
- Born: Rafael Addiego Bruno; 23 February 1923 Salto, Uruguay
- Died: 20 February 2014 (aged 90) Montevideo, Uruguay
- Party: Civic Union
- Spouse: Alicia Rey Nebril
- Education: University of the Republic
- Occupation: Jurist, politician, lawyer

Rafael Addiego Bruno (23 February 1923 – 20 February 2014) was a Uruguayan jurist and political figure.

He was President of Uruguay, as an interim chief executive, between February and March 1985 and between the resignation of Gregorio Álvarez and the accession to the office of Julio María Sanguinetti.

== Background ==
Addiego had been president of the Supreme Court since 1984 when the sitting president, General Gregorio Álvarez, who did not look favourably on the candidacy of the Colorado Party's Sanguinetti and his subsequent election to the presidency in November 1984, opted under pressure to resign in February 1985.

By 1985 there had been increasing divisions among members of the National Security Council, which had originally sponsored Álvarez's appointment to the presidency in 1981. In addition, Sanguinetti and his Colorado Party supporters felt they had strong reasons to seek to discredit Álvarez in favour of their candidate. For both the (relatively) moderate members of the National Security Council and for Sanguinetti and his supporters, a mutually acceptable transitional figure was sought.

== President of Uruguay (interim) ==
Thus it was Addiego who briefly came to serve out the remainder of Álvarez's expected term of office until President-elect Sanguinetti was sworn in at the beginning of March 1985.

Defenders of the political arrangement whereby Addiego became president were able to point out that it enabled Sanguinetti to receive the transfer of office from a civilian (Álvarez being a General). To international observers, the public relations aspect of what was billed as Uruguay's transition to democracy was enhanced by the increased psychological distance between Sanguinetti and Álvarez. Sceptics were able to recall that since Juan María Bordaberry's 1973 coup, which had led to the increased involvement of the Uruguayan military in the government, various of the so-called 'Military Government' Presidents - Bordaberry, Demicheli and Méndez, were in fact civilians, and it had been the military-backed National Security Council in any case which had cooperated with the November 1984 Presidential elections. Furthermore, it is an undoubted fact that many members of Sanguinetti's Colorado party supported rule by decree, both in the preceding 12 years and, indeed, during the extra-parliamentary régime of Gabriel Terra during the 1930s.

From whatever perspective, however, the reasons which led to Addiego's brief period of presidential office exemplify something of the nature and even the ambiguities underlying the transition to Sanguinetti's presidency.

The episode which led to Addiego's taking up the interim office of the Uruguayan Presidency arguably has historical parallels with the reluctance of US President-elect Dwight D. Eisenhower to observe pre-inaugural protocols with the outgoing administration of President Harry S. Truman in 1953, at a time of heightened political and discoursive tension.

When he succeeded to the presidency, Addiego had not hitherto held the office of Vice President of Uruguay, since that office had been in abeyance since 1973. Following Addiego's relinquishing of presidential office, the office of Vice President of Uruguay was revived.

== Political affiliation and later career ==
During the 1973–1985 period of civilian-military rule in the later part of which Addiego Bruno participated as president of the Supreme Court and subsequently interim president of the Republic, his overt political affiliation was not apparent. He has subsequently identified himself, however, with the Uruguayan Unión Cívica. After relinquishing the interim Presidency in March 1985, he continued to serve as president of the Supreme Court, stepping down in 1993.

At Addiego`s death in 2014, his reputation as a former holder of Uruguayan public offices was one which identified him with professedly constitutional processes, even though he had been president of the Supreme Court during a controversial period of civilian-military rule and had not been elected to the office of President of Uruguay which he held on an interim basis during February–March 1985. In this, he resembled several late 19th-century interim presidents, who served as temporary heads of state as a result of sometimes complex, bargaining procedures between prominent, political power-brokers.

== See also ==
- Politics of Uruguay
- Vice President of Uruguay#Lack of inherent legal position
- Salto Department#Noted local individuals

Political offices
Preceded by Gregorio Álvarez	President of Uruguay; 1985	Succeeded by Julio María Sanguinetti
