= Julio María Sanguinetti =

President of Uruguay (1985–1990; 1995–2000)

Julio María Sanguinetti OSP OYC OSC ODSC OOL
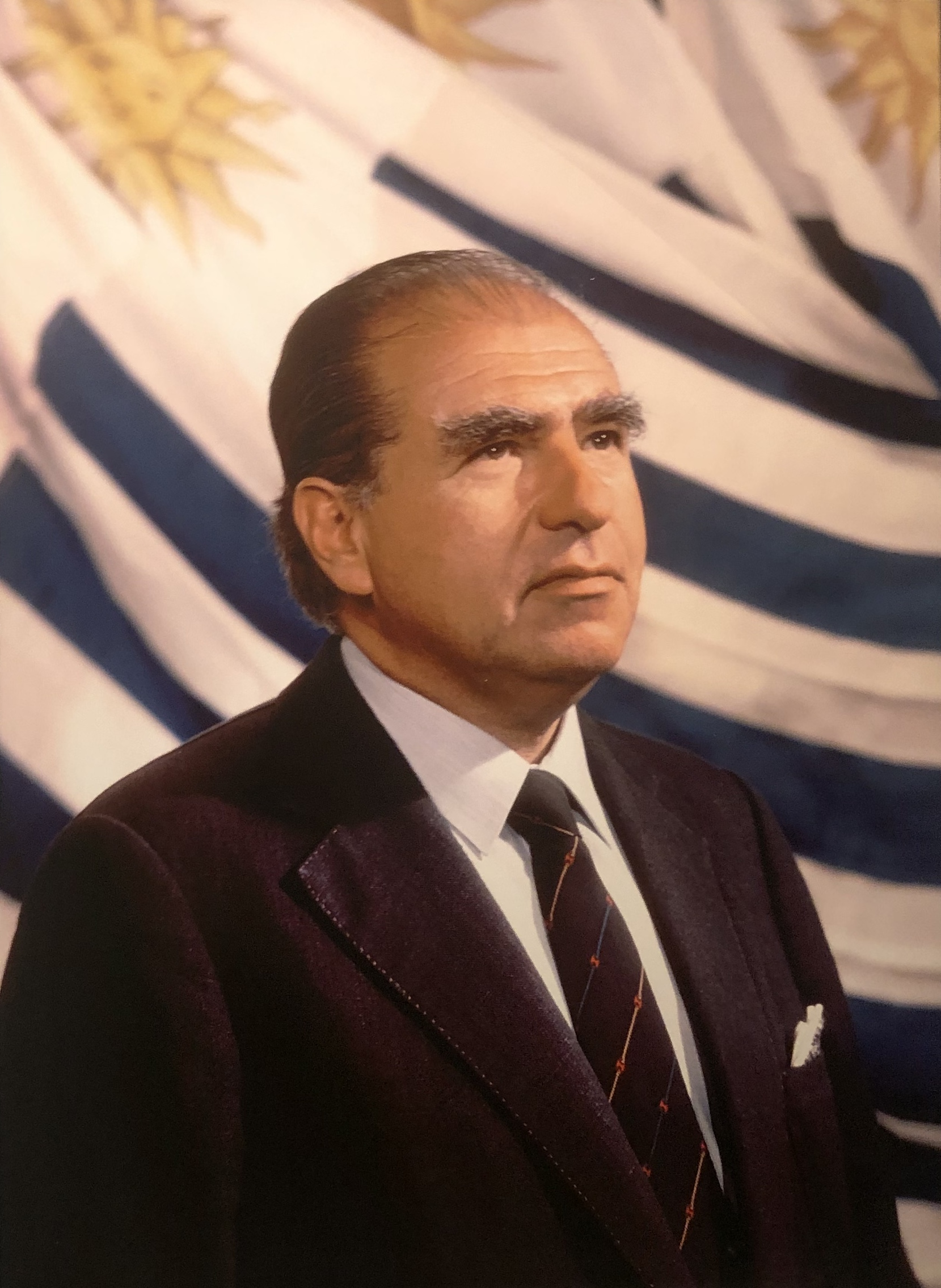
- Presidential portrait

35th and 37th President of Uruguay
- In office 1 March 1995 – 1 March 2000
- Vice President: Hugo Batalla (1995–1998); Hugo Fernández Faingold (1998–2000)
- Preceded by: Luis Alberto Lacalle
- Succeeded by: Jorge Batlle
- In office 1 March 1985 – 1 March 1990
- Vice President: Enrique Tarigo
- Preceded by: Rafael Addiego Bruno (acting)
- Succeeded by: Luis Alberto Lacalle

Minister of Education and Culture
- In office 1 March 1972 – 27 October 1972
- President: Juan María Bordaberry
- Preceded by: Ángel Rath
- Succeeded by: José María Robaina Ansó

Minister of Industry and Commerce
- In office 15 September 1969 – 2 April 1971
- President: Jorge Pacheco Areco
- Preceded by: Venancio Flores
- Succeeded by: Juan Pedro Amestoy

Personal details
- Born: 6 January 1936 (age 90) Montevideo, Uruguay
- Party: Colorado Party
- Spouse: Marta Canessa
- Children: 2
- Education: University of the Republic
- Occupation: Politician
- Profession: Journalist, Lawyer
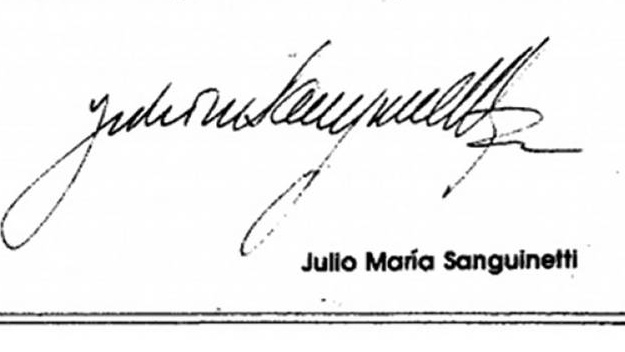
- Signature

Julio María Sanguinetti Coirolo (Spanish pronunciation: [ˈxuljo maˈɾia saŋɡiˈneti kojˈɾolo]; born 6 January 1936) often known by his initials JMS, is a Uruguayan former lawyer, journalist and politician of the Colorado Party (PC) who served as the President of Uruguay as the 35th president from 1985 to 1990, and again as the 37th president from 1995 to 2000. He was the first democratically elected president after twelve years of military dictatorship.

Born in Montevideo, Sanguinetti graduated from the University of the Republic in 1961 with a law degree. He later combined his legal practice with work as a journalist. He had already been writing for the press, first in the weekly Canelones and later, since 1955, as a columnist for Acción, a newspaper established by the then-President, Luis Batlle Berres, for which he covered events such as the Cuban Revolution and the OAS Foreign Ministers' summit that censured Cuba for its decision to establish relations with the Soviet Union.

In the 1962 general election, Sanguinetti was elected National Representative for the Montevideo Department, and re-elected in 1966. In 1969 the then president Jorge Pacheco Areco appointed him Minister of Industry and Commerce. From March to October 1972 he served as Minister of Education and Culture under Juan María Bordaberry. He publicly opposed the 1973 coup d'état and the subsequent civil-military dictatorship.

Sanguinetti participated in the Naval Club Pact that made the democratic transition possible. In the 1984 general election he was elected President of Uruguay as the most voted candidate of the most voted political party, according to the Ley de Lemas system. Major government initiatives he undertook during his first term consisted of measures to disarm the previous regime, and included an amnesty law in favor of people who were still detained, convicted by military justice for political crimes and the Law on the Expiration of the Punitive Claims of the State. In foreign policy, Sanguinetti's government recognized and established diplomatic relations with the People's Republic of China, and signed the Alvorada Act, which added Uruguay to the regional integration process, which later led to the creation of the Southern Common Market.

== Early life and education ==
Sanguinetti Coirolo was born in Montevideo on January 6, 1936, to a middle-class Italian-Uruguayan family from the town of Chiavari near the city of Genoa. His parents were Julio León Sanguinetti Maupe and Ema Coirolo Saravia. His maternal grandmother was Regina Saravia de Coirolo, daughter of Chiquito Saravia, brother of Aparicio Saravia, caudillo of the National Party.

Raised in a politically diverse family, he joined the Colorado Party in his teens. He attended Elbio Fernández School for his primary education, and the Liceo José Enrique Rodó and Alfredo Vásquez Acevedo Institute for his secondary education. In 1955 he enrolled at the University of the Republic, from which he obtained a law degree in 1961.

== Early political career ==
In 1963, at the age of 27, Sanguinetti became a member of the Chamber of Representative for the Montevideo Department. In 1964 he was a member of the Uruguayan delegation that participated in the establishment of the United Nations Conference on Trade and Development (UNCTAD) in Geneva.

In 1966, Sanguinetti served as a member of the drafting group and informer on Constitutional Reform and from 1967 he was a member of the advisory group of Colorado President Jorge Pacheco on affairs related to the Organization of American States. Later on, in 1969, Pacheco appointed him as Minister for Industry and Commerce, a position which he occupied until 1971, when he was appointed Head of the Uruguayan Trade Mission to the USSR. He also became Deputy Editor of Acción.

In March 1972, the new President, also from the PC Party, Juan María Bordaberry, brought him to the government once again as Minister for Education and Culture. That same year, Sanguinetti was a founding member of the National Commission for the Historical, Artistic and Cultural Heritage of the Nation.

== Civilian-military administration 1973–1985 ==
The breach of the constitutional order by the Armed Forces in June 1973 deprived him of his positions in the Government and in the Chamber of Representatives, where he had renewed his seat once again in 1971, as well as his position as Deputy Editor of Acción Newspaper - which was closed down - and President of the National Council of Visual Arts, to which he had been appointed in 1967. In 1976 he was prohibited from undertaking any political activity.

During the following years, Sanguinetti worked as a journalist, working from a viewpoint that was critical of the de facto Government, in El Día Newspaper (1973–1981), Visión Newspaper (since 1974, as an opinion columnist, a collaboration which he has continued up until today), and in the weekly publication Correo de los Viernes (established by him in 1981 and edited until 1984), as well as in the promotion of cultural and sports activities as the President of the Regional UNESCO Centre for the promotion of books in South America (1975–1984) and Vice-President of the popular Peñarol Football Club.

Following the rejection of the constitutional project on 30 November 1980 and having had his political rights restored on 29 June 1981, Sanguinetti headed the PC delegation in the political party negotiations with the army in order to allow a peaceful and ordered transition to democracy. The negotiations ended with the signing of the Naval Club Pact on 3 August 1984. In 1983 he was elected Secretary General of the Executive Committee of PC and in August 1984 he obtained the majority nomination for the presidential elections which were to be held later that year, putting an end to 12 years of dictatorship. Sanguinetti also received significant support for his candidacy from the ruling military.

== First presidency (1985–1990) ==
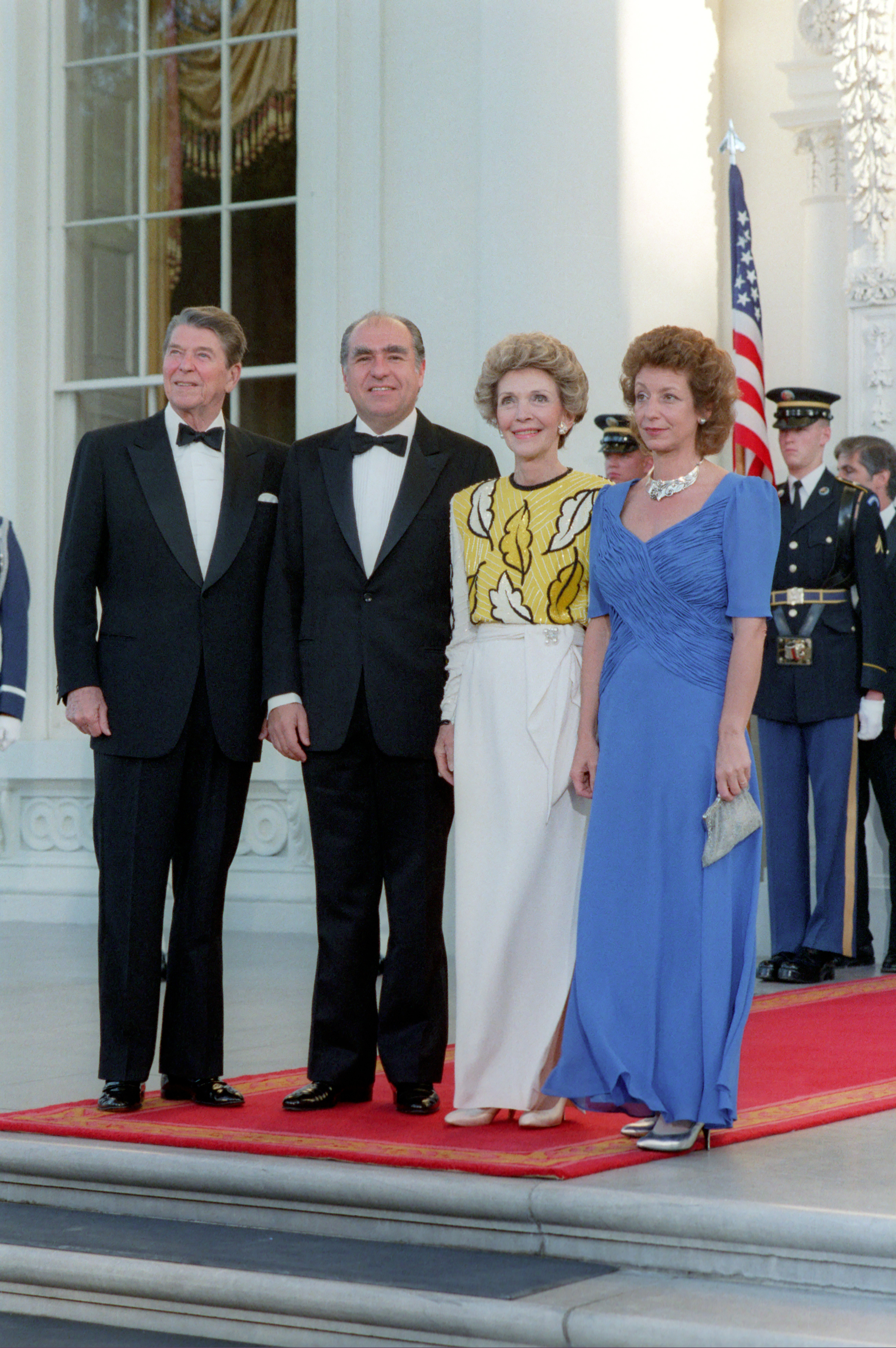
Ronald Reagan, Sanguinetti, Nancy Reagan, and Marta Canessa on the White House, 1986.

On 25 November 1984, general elections were held. Sanguinetti won 31.2% of the votes, defeating the best PN candidate, Alberto Zumarán; thus on 1 March 1985 he was sworn in as president with a 5-year term substituting the temporary president, Rafael Addiego, who had in turn substituted the military president, Gregorio Álvarez, on the previous 12 February. The ceremony was attended by 72 foreign representatives as an expression of support from the international community towards that new era in Uruguayan politics. (At the time, Sanguinetti had been unwilling to participate in an office-conferring ceremony together with Álvarez, and thus the interim arrangement with Addiego was worked out with the agreement of the parties concerned, but in later years Álvarez found a not so unlikely defender in Sanguinetti, who argued that Álvarez's legal troubles since the coming of the Broad Front government in 2005 were unnecessarily one-sided, since known former Tupamaro insurgents were being ignored by Uruguayan justice.)

Considered at the time a progressive politician in political questions and more conservative in economic questions, Sanguinetti managed to rehabilitate the image of a party that included a great variety of ideological diversity, the more conservative sectors of which had supported the coup d'état in 1973. He immediately lifted the ban on political parties and leaders that had actively opposed the dictatorship and signed an amnesty for political prisoners.

With respect to foreign relations, Sanguinetti re-launched relations with Spain and re-established contacts with communist countries. In the nearer geographic arena, on 26 May 1987, and as a colophon to several preparatory meetings, he signed the Montevideo Agreement with his colleague, Raúl Alfonsín. This agreement was decisive in giving an impulse to regional economic integration according to the objectives outlined in the South American Integration Association (ALADI).

Alfonsín had already been negotiating an ambitious agreement to dismantle tariffs in bilateral trade with the Brazilian José Sarney; now, Sanguinetti was included in an open field project that adopted a three-country shape and that gained impulse from the summit of the three presidents which the Uruguayan had organized in Colonia on 6 February 1988. With the inclusion of Paraguay, all this work led to the creation of the Southern Common Market (MERCOSUR) in 1991.

In the economic area, Sanguinetti's Government had the reduction of the USD $510 million foreign debt as one of its most important objectives. This is an enormous figure which is close to the level of national production. Likewise, Sanguinetti was an active member of the Support Group (Uruguay, Peru, Brazil and Argentina) of the Contadora Group (Mexico, Colombia, Venezuela and Panama), an informal consultative forum dedicated to exploring preventive measures against the expansion of armed conflicts in Central America, which, in December 1986 decided to merge with the so-called Group of Eight, which in turn was called the Río Group in October 1990 coinciding with its expansion to include Chile, Ecuador, Bolivia and Paraguay. Sanguinetti presided the II Group of Eight Meeting, in Punta del Este on 29 October 1988.

In his first presidential term, the Uruguayan economy, which had suffered from a deep depression until 1985, registered positive indicators with production growth, a reduction in inflation, stabilization of unemployment and an increase in exports. The confrontation with trade unions -which demanded separation from the IMF and non-payment of the national debt- was compensated with opening up agreements among political parties to strengthen the consensus between the parties in order to bring forward legislation which was in the general interest. The result of this consensus was the National Agreement which was signed on 1 April 1986 by PC, PN, the left-wing Broad Front (FA) and the conservative Unión Cívica (UC).

Towards the end of his presidency, in spite of the agreements reached for its re-financing, Uruguay's foreign debt kept on increasing, always slightly below GDP, which was also reduced to a virtually nonexistent growth rate. Inflation also experienced a strong increase and 1990 ended with a 130% inflation rate.

A very particular aspect of his first term in office was the handling of the military issues. Uruguay had endured 12 long years of military dictatorship and the transition to democracy was very hard. Many opposition leaders and human-right organizations fought for truth and justice, and hundreds of cases were brought to the courts; but the military refused to cooperate, a political crisis was about to take place and, at the end of 1986, the very controversial Law on the Expiration of the Punitive Claims of the State was passed by the Parliament.

On 1 March 1990, Sanguinetti handed over the Presidency to Luis Alberto Lacalle, the PN candidate who had won the elections on 26 November 1989. Sanguinetti remained committed to journalism and to academic activities as well as to the internal politics of his party as the leader of the Batllist Forum, which had a Social Democratic ideology, the most important faction of PC along with Batllismo Unido, headed by Jorge Batlle.

Among the several prominent politicians who served in his government can be mentioned: Enrique V. Iglesias, Antonio Marchesano, Ricardo Zerbino, Juan Vicente Chiarino, Adela Reta, Hugo Fernández Faingold, Luis Brezzo, Alejandro Atchugarry and Ariel Davrieux. Opposition leader Wilson Ferreira Aldunate played a key role in the definition of the most difficult issues for the democratic institutions.

== Second presidency (1995–2000) ==
Sanguinetti sought a second term in the 1994 presidential elections on 27 November, which he won with 24.7% of the vote, beating Tabaré Vázquez of the Encuentro Progresista-Frente Amplio (EP-FA) coalition, the other PC candidates - Jorge Batlle and Jorge Pacheco - as well as the three PN candidates, the strongest of which was Alberto Volonté who received 14.9% of the vote.

While Vázquez won the most votes of any individual candidate, under the Ley de Lemas still in force at the time, the highest-finishing candidate from the party winning the most votes would become president. This was the case even if that candidate was not the most-voted individual candidate (in practice this only affected the two biggest parties). In this case, even though Sanguinetti finished with 121,000 fewer votes than Vázquez, the Colorados polled 32.3% of the vote between them higher than the combined 31.2% received by the PN and the 30.6% received by Vázquez's Broad Front. On 1 March 1995 Sanguinetti was sworn in as the third leader to be re-elected in the country's history.

Sanguinetti formed a coalition Government with PN which received 4 ministries, the Gobierno del Pueblo Party (PGP) - created by those who had broken away from the PC- whose leader, Hugo Batalla, was given the Vice-Presidency-, along with an independent cabinet minister with Unión Cívica ties.

This alliance framework allowed him to bring the budget through a parliament divided in equal parts between the three main groups each year until the end of his term along with the reforms of the Social Security Law –attacked by worker and pensioner organizations- as well as the constitutional reform. Guaranteed the backing of two-thirds of the parliament, this reform, which eliminated the almost hundred-year old Ley de Lemas, was supported by 50.45% of the votes and came into force on 14 January 1997.

The amendments strengthened the executive power against the legislative power and undertook a profound reform of the electoral system. Among other points, it limited each party to a single presidential candidate. If no candidate won a majority in the first round, the top two candidates in the first round would advance to a runoff.

The expansionist economic policy of his Government brought about a reduction in the recession of -1.8% which had been registered the previous year, partly due to a fall in exports, and gave way to high growth rates that didn't generate inflation. The opposite is true in fact, this variable experimented a continuous fall until it reached around 6% in 1999. The positive results in trading and in key production sectors generated employment that gave way to improved salaries and pensions, a general increase in income that in turn increased investment and internal consumption.

This boom panorama was drastically affected by the Brazilian crisis of 1998-1999, which reduced the products it bought from Uruguay; Brazil was the destination of more than a third of total Uruguayan exports. This interdependence was created within MERCOSUR, whose IX, XIII and XVII summits were hosted by Sanguinetti, respectively on the 7 December 1995 in Punta del Este, 15 December 1997 in Montevideo, and, again, on 8 December 1999, also in Montevideo.

On 1 March 2000 his term as President ended and he handed over the Presidency to his colleague Jorge Batlle, who had won the elections on 28 November 1999.

Among the many prominent politicians who took part in his government can be mentioned: Didier Opertti, Guillermo Stirling, Luis Antonio Hierro López, Álvaro Ramos, Luis Mosca, Luis Brezzo, Lucio Cáceres, Juan Antonio Chiruchi, and Ariel Davrieux. The Nationalist leader Alberto Volonté was pivotal in daily affairs of the government coalition.

== Post-presidency (2000–present) ==
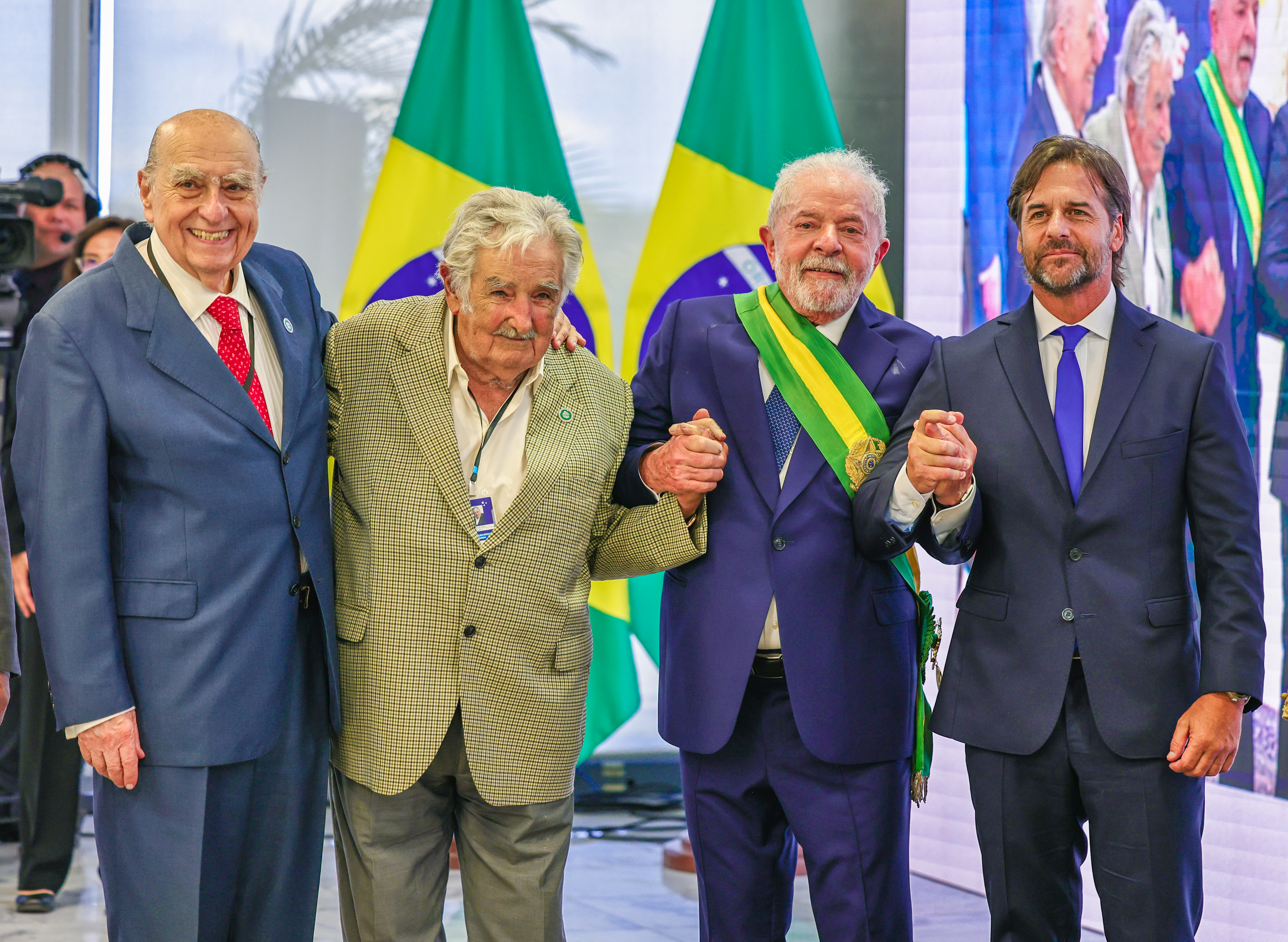
Sanguinetti, José Mujica, Luiz Inácio Lula da Silva, and Luis Lacalle Pou on Lula's third presidential inauguration in 2023.

Always active in journalism and in the cultural world, during his break from presidential duties between 1990 and 1995 Sanguinetti was a columnist for the EFE Press Agency and El País, both Spanish companies. His link with Spain was strengthened as the Director of several Seminars organized by the Complutense University in Madrid and as a lecturer in summer courses at the Menéndez Pelayo International University in Santander.

Since 1996 he has promoted the work of individuals from the political and intellectual world, including the former Colombian President Belisario Betancur, the former Spanish President, Felipe González, the former President of Chile, Ricardo Lagos and the former President of Brazil, Fernando Henrique Cardoso. This group is known as the Montevideo Circle.

Since 1990, he has also been President of the PAX Institute, an academic foundation for international action. He is likewise a member of the InterAcción Council – another forum for retired world leaders that centers its work on the elaboration of reports and studies offering advice on diverse areas of the international arena- as well as of the Council of Presidents and Prime Ministers of the Carter Center in Atlanta, Georgia. He is also a member of Washington D.C.–based Western Hemisphere think tank, the Inter-American Dialogue.

He professed support for the same-sex marriage bill recently approved by the Uruguayan legislature.

Sanguinetti was a pre-candidate for the presidential primaries in June 2019 supported by the Batllistas political sector of the Colorado Party, and accompanied by some of his former trusted advisers, including former ministers and politicians from the Foro Batllista. In the primaries, he was second, being surpassed by Ernesto Talvi, who was proclaimed the presidential candidate of the PC. After being elected senator for the 49th Legislature in the general election of October 2019, Sanguinetti expressed his intention to collaborate from Parliament with the Multicolor Coalition during the first year, and then work on his activities as general secretary of the Colorado Party. He resigned his senatorial seat on October 20, 2020, announcing that he will begin a "full dedication" stage to his party. He resigned with former President José Mujica (2010-2015).

== Writings ==
He has received honorary doctorate degrees from the Universities of Brasília (1985), Moscow (1990), Asunción (1994), Genoa and Bucharest, and, excluding short articles and studies, he has published the books entitled Alcances y aplicaciones de la nueva Constitución uruguaya [The Scope and Application of the New Uruguayan Constitution] (1967), La nación, el nacionalismo y otros ismos [The Nation, Nationalism and other '-isms'] (1978), El temor y la impaciencia Fear and Impatience (1991), El año 501 [The Year 501] (1992), Un mundo sin Marx [A World without Marx] (1993) y Meditaciones del milenio [Meditations of the Millennium] (1994), "El doctor Figari" [Doctor Figari] (2002), "La agonía de una democracia" [Agony of a democracy] (2008), "La reconquista, Proceso de la restauración democrática en Uruguay (1980-1990)" [The reconquest, Process of Uruguay's democratic rs restoration] (2012), "Retratos desde la memoria (Debate, Montevideo)" [Portraits from memory] (2015), "El cronista y la historia" [The reporter and history] (2017).

== Personal life ==
He is married to the historian and journalist Marta Canessa; they have two children, Julio Luis and Emma, both of them lawyers.

== Honours ==
=== Foreign honours ===
- Argentina:
  - Collar of the Order of the Liberator General San Martín
- Brazil:
  - Grand Collar of the National Order of the Southern Cross
- Chile:
  - Collar of the Order of Merit
- Colombia:
  - Grand Collar of the Order of Boyaca
  - Grand Collar of the Order of San Carlos
- El Salvador:
  - Grand Cross of the National Order of José Matías Delgado
- France:
  - Grand Cross of the National Order of Legion of Honour
- Guatemala:
  - Collar of the Order of the Quetzal
- Italy:
  - Knight Grand Cross with Collar of the Order of Merit of the Italian Republic
- Malaysia:
  - Honorary Recipient of the Order of the Crown of the Realm
- Mexico:
  - Collar of the Order of the Aztec Eagle
- Panama:
  - Collar of the Order of Manuel Amador Guerrero
- Paraguay:
  - Collar of the National Order of Merit
- Peru:
  - Grand Cross of the Order of the Sun of Peru
- Spain:
  - Knight of the Collar of the Order of Isabella the Catholic
- Venezuela:
  - Collar of the Order of the Liberator
  - Grand Cross of the Order of Andres Bello

=== National ===
- Honorary Member of IHGU, 2000.
- Honorary President of Peñarol.

=== Awards ===
In 2007, Sanguinetti was awarded the prestigious FCG International Award for a Lifetime Achievement by the Cristóbal Gabarrón Foundation from Spain (FCG International Awards).

== See also ==
- Politics of Uruguay
- List of political families#Uruguay

Political offices
Preceded by Rafael Addiego Bruno	President of Uruguay; 1985–1990	Succeeded by Luis Alberto Lacalle
Preceded by Luis Alberto Lacalle	President of Uruguay; 1995–2000	Succeeded by Jorge Batlle
