= Jorge Batlle =

38th President of Uruguay (2000–2005)

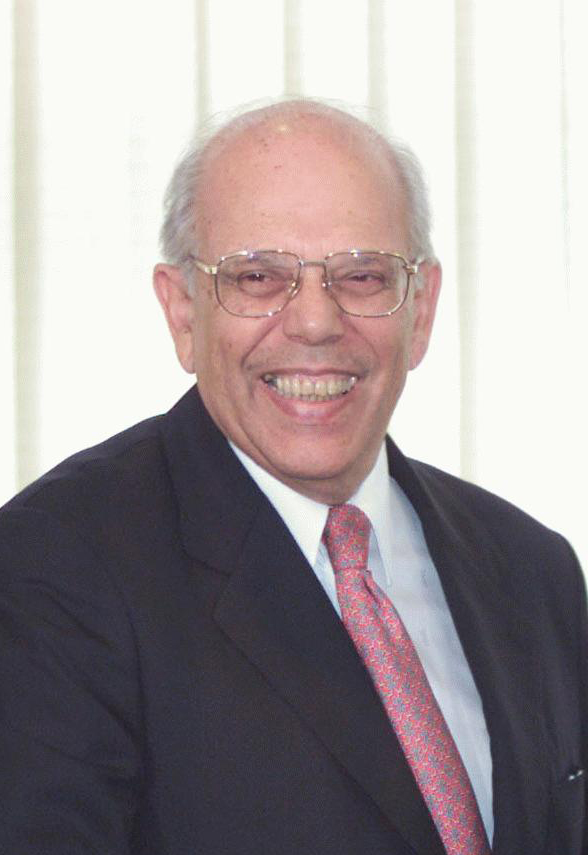
- Batlle in 2003

38th President of Uruguay
- In office 1 March 2000 – 1 March 2005
- Vice President: Luis Antonio Hierro López
- Preceded by: Julio María Sanguinetti
- Succeeded by: Tabaré Vázquez

Senator of Uruguay
- In office 15 February 1995 – 26 April 1999
- Constituency: At-large
- In office 15 February 1985 – 29 May 1989
- Constituency: At-large

Representative of Uruguay
- In office 15 February 1959 – 15 February 1967
- Constituency: Montevideo

Personal details
- Born: 25 October 1927 Montevideo, Uruguay
- Died: 24 October 2016 (aged 88) Montevideo, Uruguay
- Resting place: Central Cemetery of Montevideo
- Party: Colorado Party
- Spouses: Noemí Lamuraglia (m. 1957; div. 1983) Mercedes Menafra (m. 1989)
- Relations: Batlle family
- Children: Raúl Lorenzo; Beatriz
- Parent(s): Luis Batlle Berres; Matilde Ibáñez Tálice
- Education: University of the Republic

Jorge Luis Batlle Ibáñez (Spanish pronunciation: [ˈxoɾxe ˈlwis ˈbaʝe iˈβaɲes]; Batlle locally [ˈbaʒe] or [ˈbaʃe]; 25 October 1927 – 24 October 2016) was a Uruguayan politician and lawyer, who served as the 38th president of Uruguay from 2000 to 2005. A member of the Colorado Party, he previously served as National Representative from 1959 to 1967, and as Senator of the Republic from 1985 to 1990 and from 1990 to 1999. Batlle is, to date, the last president from the Colorado Party.

The eldest son of the 30th president Luis Batlle Berres and a member of the Batlle family, he was the fourth member of the family to serve as president of the country. He graduated from the University of the Republic in 1959 with a law degree, and then began a career as a journalist in El Día newspaper. He began his political career in the 1950s, being elected National Representative in the 1958 general election. During the civil-military dictatorship he was banned and in the 1984 general election that led to the democratic transition he was prevented from running for president, he could only run for the Senate.

His presidency was marked by the worsening of a banking crisis and a foot-and-mouth epidemic that affected the country's economy. Some of his initiatives consisted of the creation of the Comisión para la Paz (Spanish for 'Commission for Peace'), an investigative body on human rights with the purpose of determining the situation of those detained-disappeared during the civil-military dictatorship. In foreign policy, Batlle's government strengthened Uruguay's ties with the United States and broke diplomatic relations with Cuba.

== Early life and education ==
Jorge Luis Batlle Ibáñez was born on October 25, 1927 in Montevideo. He was the eldest son of Luis Batlle Berres and Matilde Ibáñez Tálice. He had two siblings, Luis (1930–2016) and Matilde (born 1932). He was a member of the Batlle family originally from Sitges, Catalonia, Spain, and which includes several presidents of Uruguay, such as José Batlle y Ordoñez, who was his great-uncle. On his paternal side, he was of Catalan descent, whereas on his mother's side, he was of Italian descent.

He attended the Elbio Fernández School and the German School of Montevideo. He obtained a law degree from the University of the Republic in 1959.

== Early political career (1958–1965) ==
By 1958, when he was first elected Congressman for the Colorado Party, Batlle had been active in journalism both in Radio "Ariel" and the newspaper "Acción". He was also by that time a member of the governing body of his Party.

== National leadership (1965–1971) ==
In 1965 Batlle was elected the sole leader of List 15 of the Colorado Party, a position that had become vacant after the death of his father the previous year. He proposed a return to a presidential system, eliminating the National Council of Government, and was one of the drafters and promoters of the constitutional reform that gave rise to the 1967 Constitution. He unsuccessfully ran for president in 1966, and was part of a financial scandal in 1968, which was never proven. He ran for president again in 1971 without success.

== Civic-military dictatorship (1973–1985) ==
During the period of civilian-military administration in Uruguay (1973–1985), Batlle did not occupy any legislative or official position, having been banned from political activity by decree. He was detained on several occasions. He did preside over the Legislative General Assembly in February 1985, when the first democratically elected Congress was seated after the military interregnum. He has a very active legislative record. Dr. Batlle was also a leading promoter and drafter of two Constitutional Amendments, one in 1966 and the other more recently in 1996. He was defeated again in the 1989 and 1994 presidential elections, and won the 1999 elections, taking office in 2000.

== Presidency (2000–2005) ==
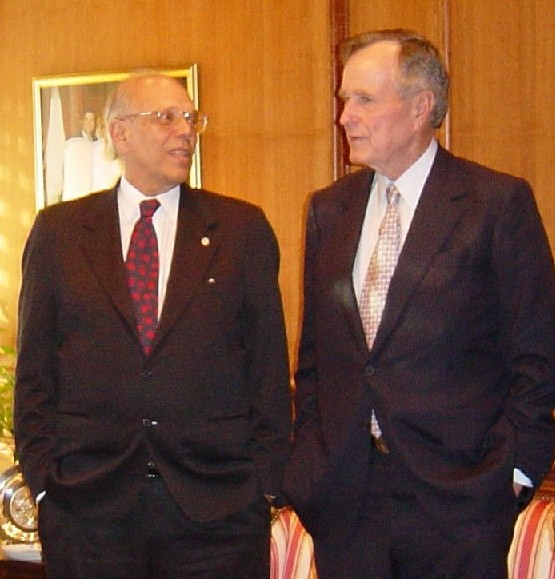
Jorge Batlle with American president George H. W. Bush.

Batlle took office at a particularly difficult moment for Uruguay, as an economic depression led the country 2002 Uruguay banking crisis and close to sovereign default, and a third of the population below the poverty line. Batlle's determination to reduce public spending, aimed at preserving the macroeconomic balance, made it possible for Uruguay to be highly regarded as a country with a sound management of its economic affairs. US president George W. Bush helped him to prevent default with $1.5 billion in credit.

His administration had to deal with a foot-and-mouth disease outbreak, which threatened access of Uruguayan beef to international markets. Before the end of his term, Uruguay had re-gained disease-free status.

Batlle firmly backed MERCOSUR, which he saw as instrumental for an open regional integration into the world economy. He favoured strengthening MERCOSUR by forming associations such as the one envisaged in the so-called "4+1" agreement with the United States. He maintained close diplomatic ties with the US at a time when the Pink tide in Latin America was marked by several regional governments that distanced themselves from the US. He had a diplomatic conflict with Cuba, as he criticised the human rights record of the Castro's regime.

In 2002, he deals with the law on the legalization of prostitution.

He proposed the legalization of cocaine, as a way to reduce the political clout of drug cartels.

He was also in favour of the creation of the Free Trade Association of the Americas (FTAA). As president, Batlle was firmly set against protectionism and subsidies of any kind; he has been a consistent spokesman for unhampered free trade.

Human rights deserve a separate chapter in Batlle's presidency. He helped create the Comisión para la Paz. Later on, he announced the finding of Macarena, the granddaughter of Argentine poet Juan Gelman born to her disappeared mother.

== Post-presidency (2005–2016) ==
=== Final years ===
Jorge Batlle stayed active in politics after the end of his presidency. He criticised the Uruguayan presidents that succeeded him (Tabaré Vázquez and José Mujica) through newspapers columns and social media.

=== Death and funeral ===
Jorge Batlle fell and struck his head after he fainted during an event at the Colorado party. He was hospitalized at the Sanatorio Americano hospital, and underwent surgery to stop an intracranial hemorrhage. The operation failed, and he died on 24 October 2016, one day shy of his 89th birthday. Uruguay declared a day of national mourning upon his death.

== Personal life ==
Batlle married Noemí Lamuraglia in 1957. They had two children, Beatriz (born 1962) and Raúl Lorenzo (born 1965).

== Documentary ==
- Jorge Batlle: entre el cielo y el infierno. A 2024 documentary directed by Federico Lemos.

== See also ==
- Politics of Uruguay
- List of political families#Uruguay

== Sources ==
- Maiztegui Casas, Lincoln R. (2016). Orientales: una historia política del Uruguay (in Spanish). Vol. 12. Montevideo: Editorial Planeta. ISBN 978-9974-737-51-8.

Political offices
Preceded by Julio María Sanguinetti	President of Uruguay; 2000–2005	Succeeded by Tabaré Vázquez
