= Civic-military dictatorship of Uruguay =

1973–1985 military regime in Uruguay

Oriental Republic of Uruguay República Oriental del Uruguay
- 1973–1985
- Flag Coat of arms
- Motto: "Libertad o Muerte" (Spanish) "Freedom or Death"
- Anthem: Himno Nacional de Uruguay "National Anthem of Uruguay"
- Capital: Montevideo
- Common languages: Spanish
- Government: Military dictatorship
- President
  - 1973–1976: Juan María Bordaberry
  - 1976: Alberto Demicheli
  - 1976–1981: Aparicio Méndez
  - 1981–1985: Gregorio Álvarez
  - 1985: Rafael Addiego
- Historical era: Cold War
  - Coup d'état: June 27, 1973
  - Elections: November 25, 1984
  - Transition to democracy: March 1, 1985
- HDI (1980): 0.658 medium
- Currency: Peso (1973−1975); Nuevo peso (1975−1985)
- ISO 3166 code: UY
Preceded by	Succeeded by
Uruguay	Uruguay

The civic-military dictatorship of Uruguay (Spanish: Dictadura cívico-militar de Uruguay) (1973–1985), also known as the Uruguayan Dictatorship (Spanish: Dictadura uruguaya), was a military dictatorship that ruled Uruguay for almost 12 years, from June 27, 1973 (after the 1973 coup d'état) until March 1, 1985. The dictatorship has been the subject of much controversy due to its violations of human rights, use of torture, and the unexplained disappearances of many Uruguayans. The term "civic-military" refers to the military regime's relatively gradual usurpation of power from civilian presidents who continued to serve as head of state, which distinguished it from dictatorships in other South American countries in which senior military officers immediately seized power and directly served as head of state.

The dictatorship was the culmination of an escalation of violence and authoritarianism in a traditionally peaceful and democratic country, and existed within the context of other military dictatorships in the region. It resulted in the suppression of all former political activity, including the traditional political parties. Many people were imprisoned and tortured, especially Uruguayans with left-wing sympathies.

== Political situation ==
The slow road to dictatorship started in the late 1960s. Between 1952 and 1967, the country experimented with a collective presidency. The National Council of Government had nine members, six from the majority party and three from the opposition. It provided weak leadership in the midst of a worsening economic situation.

After the re-establishment of the Presidency, the new President Óscar Diego Gestido of the Colorado Party was unable to improve economic conditions. He died in December 1967, six months after taking office. His constitutional successor, President Jorge Pacheco Areco (1967–1972), banned the Socialist Party of Uruguay, other leftist organizations and their newspapers, purged liberal professors from universities, and suppressed labor unions. His repressive policies, as well as economic crisis and high inflation, fueled social conflict and far-left guerrilla activity; the latter of which manifested in the form of the Tupamaros. On June 13, 1968, Pacheco declared a state of emergency. On August 14, 1968, 29-year-old university student Líber Arce became the first student killed by police forces in Uruguay under the Pacheco administration. Another state of emergency was declared in August 1970, after Tupamaros killed US security expert Dan Mitrione, who had taught torture techniques to authoritarian regimes in Latin America. To coordinate their anti-guerrilla activities, the armed forces created the Joint Chiefs of Staff (Junta de Comandantes en Jefe y el Estado Mayor Conjunto) abbreviated as ESMACO. It was granted complete independence from the Ministry of Defense. Another state of emergency was declared in January 1971 when the Tupamaros kidnapped UK ambassador Geoffrey Jackson. On September 9, 1971, more than 100 Tupamaros escaped from jail, prompting Pacheco to order the army to suppress all guerrilla activities.

Between 1968 and 1971, expenses on the military doubled from 13.3% of the national budget to 26.2% while expenses on education fell from 24.3% to 16%.

As a sitting president, Pacheco faced a constitutional ban on consecutive terms under article 152 of the constitution. However, on the same day as the general election, a double-referendum was held. One of the proposals, put forward by the Colorado party, would have amended the constitution to allow a sitting president to run for re-election. However, it was rejected. Additionally, presidential candidate Líber Seregni received the backing of the newly created Broad Front, a coalition of over a dozen left-wing parties. He received 18.3% of the vote, the most of any third-party candidate in that election. Though outlawed in 1973, the Broad Front later put forth candidates such as former presidents Tabaré Vázquez (2005–2010, 2015–2020) and José Mujica (2010–2015), a former member of the Tupamaro urban guerrilla.

National Party candidate Wilson Ferreira Aldunate received the most votes of any individual candidate. However, the combined Colorado vote of 41% exceeded the combined National vote of 40.2% (just over 12,000 votes). Under the Ley de Lemas system in effect at the time, the highest-finishing candidate of the party that won the most votes was elected president. As a result, Pacheco's hand-picked successor Juan María Bordaberry became president, even though he personally received around 60,000 fewer votes than Ferreira.

== Bordaberry presidency: 1972–1973 ==
After becoming president on March 1, 1972, the inexperienced Bordaberry had to concentrate on fighting the Tupamaros and chose to continue Pacheco's repressive policies. On April 15, 1972, he declared a state of "internal war" and suspended civil liberties. That was then extended by the National Assembly in September 1972, November 1972, and March 1973. On July 10, 1972, a new State Security law came into force and allowed political prisoners to be tried in military courts. Army officers assumed more responsibilities in government.

By the end of the year, the army had effectively destroyed the Tupamaros and their leader, Raúl Sendic, was imprisoned. Most of the Tupamaro leaders spent 12 years in prison and later became prominent politicians.

Torture was effectively used to gather information needed to break up the Tupamaros and against trade union activists, members of the Communist Party of Uruguay and even regular citizens.

On June 22, 1972, the National Assembly decided to investigate allegations of torture and human-rights violations by the military. The military refused to cooperate with this investigation and persuaded Bordaberry to establish a joint military commission that would investigate corruption by politicians.

== Coup of 1973 ==
During the few years when it was granted extraordinary powers, the Uruguayan military had acquired a taste for political power and began to behave independently of the civilian authorities.

In late 1972, Bordaberry tried to limit the military's political powers. In an October 19, 1972 meeting with military chiefs, Bordaberry was presented with an eight-point program in which the military demanded the immovability of commanding officers, military participation in state enterprises, independence of military corruption investigation, and military control over police.

On February 8, 1973, Bordaberry tried to assert his authority over the military and appointed a retired general, Antonio Francese, as the new Minister of National Defense. The Navy initially supported the appointment while the Army and Air Force commanders rejected it outright and on February 9 and 10 issued public proclamations in which they demanded radical changes in the country's political and economic system. They promised to end unemployment, support local industry, eliminate corruption, implement land reform and end all terrorism.

Bordaberry bowed to the pressure, and on February 12, in the Air Force headquarters, concluded an agreement with the armed force commanders to provide for their involvement in politics in advisory role. A new National Security Council (COSENA) was created, consisting of Army, Air Force and Navy commanders as well as ministers of National Defense, Interior, Economics and Foreign Affairs. From now on, they were effectively in control of the country. Bordaberry had saved his post by participating in a self-coup.

== Presidents ==
- Juan María Bordaberry (1973–1976), democratically elected and later removed.
- Alberto Demicheli (1976), appointed and removed.
- Aparicio Méndez (1976–1981), appointed.
- Gregorio Álvarez (1981–1985), appointed.
- Rafael Addiego (1985), appointed.

== Dictatorship ==
Uruguay's democratically elected Parliament was dismissed on June 27, 1973 for resisting the military regime. Bordaberry created a new Council of State and put the military in control of civilian affairs. The new dictatorship was inspired by the Brazilian military government, which claimed the Cold War justified the use of all necessary means to defeat communism and socialism.

The COSENA was the de facto governing body, meeting every week, and approving policies while the JOG (Junta de Oficiales Generales) was the source of the power. By 1977, it consisted of 28 members, mostly army generals, air force brigadiers, and naval admirals. To secure its rule, on December 6, 1976, a new Council of the Nation was created by uniting the Council of the State and the JOG.

The regime's promises to improve the economy were dashed by the global economic crisis caused by the 1973 oil crisis. Uruguay began borrowing money from international lenders, chiefly from the US. Opening of the small local economy to global corporations and financial institutions ruined local Uruguayan companies, who could no longer compete. The regime was forced to borrow even more and cut budget expenditures. By 1981, the country of 3 million people owed US$4 billion.

Bordaberry gradually became even more authoritarian than the military commanders. In June 1976, he proposed a new, corporatist constitution that would have permanently shuttered the parties and codified a permanent role for the military. This was further than even the military wanted to go, and it forced him to resign.

He was succeeded by Alberto Demicheli, a Colorado and head of the Council of State who, while a relative liberal among the ruling group, canceled the elections that were supposed to take place in 1976. However, he refused to sign a law removing the political rights of thousands of politicians. In his place, on September 1, 1976, a senior politician, Aparicio Méndez of the National Party, was appointed president.

The Minister of Economy and Finance, Alejandro Végh Villegas, tried to improve the economy by promoting the finance sector and foreign investment. Spending on social services was cut and many state-owned corporations were privatized. The economy continued to deteriorate, by 1980 GDP fell by 20% and unemployment rose to 17%. The state stepped in and bailed out many collapsing businesses and banks. The failure of the regime to improve the economy further weakened its position.

In August 1977, the armed forces announced its plan for reorganizing Uruguayan democracy. Only two traditional parties, the Blancos and Colorados, were to exist, and the president would be elected from a single, pre-approved candidate. In 1980, the regime put its plan to a vote via a referendum. In a shock to the regime, 57.2% of voters rejected the proposal. The vote marked the start of a negotiated return to democracy. The military's belief that it needed to legitimize their proposed constitution by holding an actual referendum, as opposed to simply falsifying the voting results, was itself an indication that democracy was not quite dead yet in Uruguay. Additionally, a return to civilian rule would take the responsibility of the ailing economy out of the hands of the military.

On September 1, 1981, General Gregorio Conrado Álvarez, who was secretary of the National Security Council since 1973 and Commander-in-Chief of Uruguayan Armed forces from 1978 to 1979, assumed the presidency. He began negotiations with civilian politicians about returning power to elected officials. On June 7, 1982, a law allowed the traditional political parties (Blancos, Colorados, and Civic Union Party) to resume their activities, but leftist parties remained banned. On November 28, elections were held to elect representatives to political party conventions, which then were expected to select new leaders, who then would be allowed to participate in the presidential elections of 1984.

In 1983, workers and labor unions were allowed to demonstrate on May 1. From May to July 1983, political parties and military officers held negotiations in Park Hotel without any results. On November 27, 1983, a massive street demonstration took place in Montevideo with approximately 500,000 people participating representing all political parties, becoming the largest demonstration in the history of the nation. The demonstration was denounced by the military as part of a subversive Marxist plot to destroy democracy led by the Broad Front.

== Return to democracy, 1984–1985 ==
In 1984, there were strikes against the regime and in support of political prisoners. On January 13, 1984, the first 24-hour general strike since 1973 was organized. Talks between military leadership and civilian politicians intensified despite the fact that several political leaders were still notable, such as Wilson Ferreira Aldunate. On August 3, 1984, the Naval Club Pact was signed and restored the constitution of 1967 and allowed the military to advise in security matters and control appointments of senior officers. The military also received blanket amnesty for human rights violations.

On November 25, 1984, elections were held, and following the brief presidency of Rafael Addiego Bruno, on March 1, 1985, Colorado Party candidate Julio María Sanguinetti became the new president.

The first Sanguinetti administration implemented economic reforms and consolidated democratization following the country's years under military rule. Nonetheless, Sanguinetti never supported the human rights violations accusations, and his government did not prosecute the military officials who engaged in repression and torture against either the Tupamaros or the MLN. Instead, he opted for signing an amnesty treaty, called in Spanish "Ley de Amnistía."

== Oppression and emigration ==
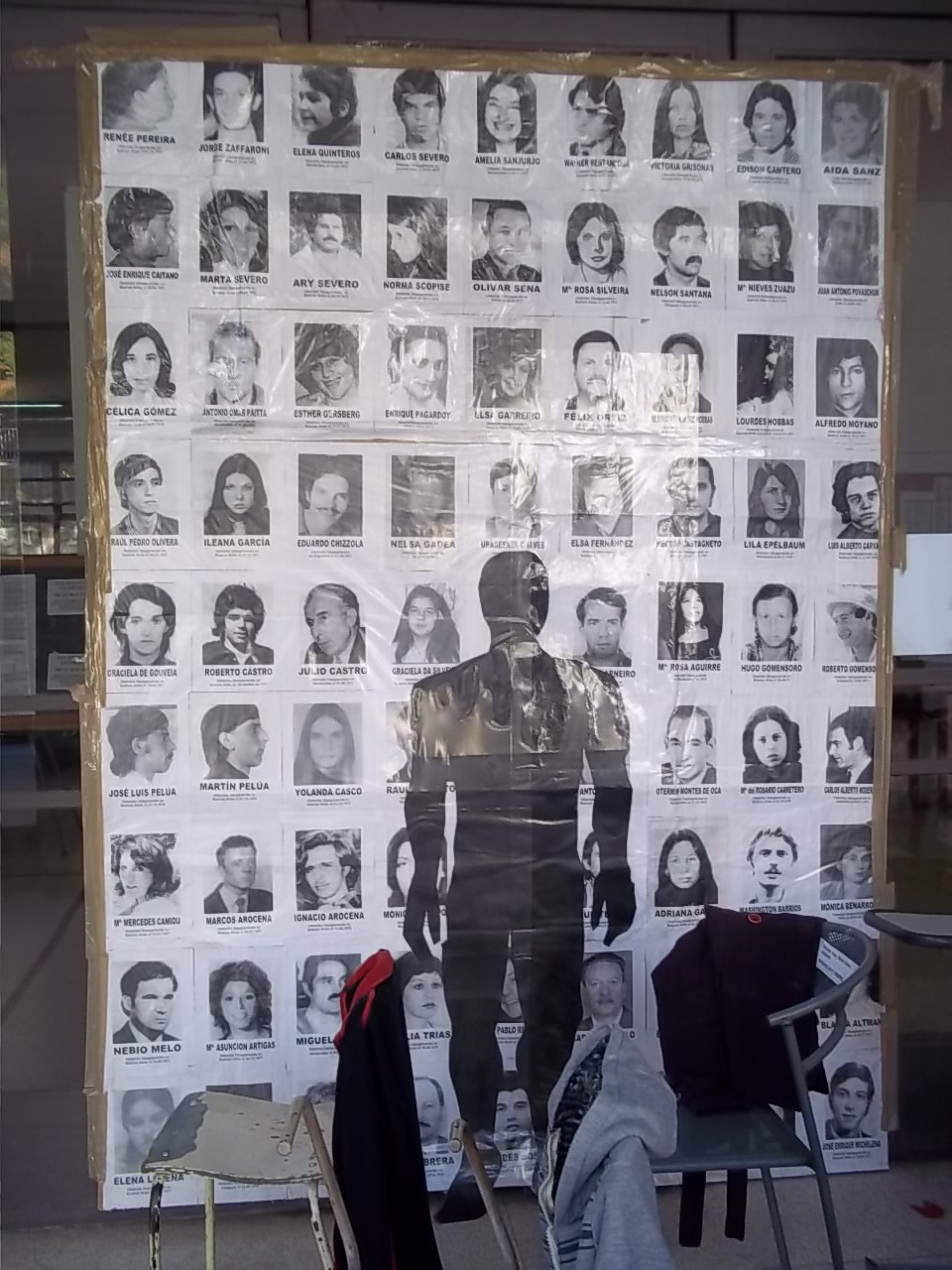
Uruguay's disappeared people

During the dictatorship, more than 5000 people were arrested for political reasons and almost 10% of Uruguayans emigrated from the country. Torture extended until the end of Uruguayan dictatorship in 1985. Uruguay had the highest number per capita of political prisoners in the world. Almost 20% of population were arrested for shorter or longer periods. MLN heads were isolated in prisons and subjected to repeated acts of torture. Emigration from Uruguay rose drastically, as large numbers of Uruguayans looked for political asylum throughout the world.

=== Forceful disappearances ===
Around 180 Uruguayans are known to have been killed during the 12-year military rule from 1973 to 1985. Most were killed in Argentina and other neighbouring countries, with only 36 of them having been killed in Uruguay. Many of those killed were never found, and the missing people have been referred to as the "disappeared", or "desaparecidos" in Spanish. The Museo de la Memoria, in Montevideo, commemorates those who were murdered or disappeared under the regime.

A commission was created in 2000 to investigate the fates of the disappeared, which indicated in a final report published in 2003 that it received and confirmed 31 reports of Uruguayans kidnapped and killed in Uruguay, 182 reports of Uruguayans kidnapped and killed in Argentina, and at least one case of a child of a kidnapped person being born in captivity and appropriated.

It has been reported afterwards that the commission's results might have been incomplete, as for many of the reports received none or incorrect information and these cases were then not reflected in the final report.

== Censorship ==
=== Media and literature ===
Government censorship infiltrated every facet of society during the dictatorship. Official government censorship of the press and other media outlets began in 1976, although more targeted censorship efforts began several years earlier. For example, in 1968, the government mandated the censorship of all official publications made by the University of the Republic after it put out a statement denouncing a warrantless raid of its campus by police.

Media outlets faced the constant threat of closure and interrogation. News outlets were required to provide the names of all journalists, editors, and other staff members to the Ministry of Education and Culture as well as a clear statement of its political views and financial sources. Articles or publications which intended to damage the nation's "prestige" were forbidden, especially the publication of news involving the Tupamaro urban guerrillas that conflicted with or questioned the veracity of government sources. Censorship was not restricted to news publications; literary works had to comply with the strictest censorship requirements in Uruguayan history and authors were detained at unprecedented levels. The ultra-conservative political environment forced many influential liberal writers to flee the country to publish their works. Throughout this period, Mario Benedetti, a prominent Uruguayan author, lived in exile in Peru, Cuba, and Spain. Through his novels, poems, and plays, Bendetti criticized the strict censorship of the Civic-Military dictatorship and called for non-violent opposition to the regime.

=== Music and radio ===
As written works critical of the government became increasingly harder to publish, some artists turned to music. As a consequence, the regime began to censor music and radio stations. The government did not send out public statements banning specific songs or broadcasts. Instead, increased scrutiny by the police led to self-censorship in an attempt to avoid arrest. Songwriters and performers of protest songs were forced to leave the country and some radio stations went so far as to stop broadcasting music altogether.

The Uruguayan musical group Los Nocheros became a propaganda tool used by the dictatorship. Their anti-communist song Disculpe was required to be played every two hours by all radio stations in Uruguay.

Military marching music became a mainstay of the regime, with such music being incorporated into various performance contexts and accompanied the official communications of the dictatorship. All foreign music was considered a threat to the regime, even from countries that otherwise supported the dictatorship, with rock music in particular being discouraged in favor of other, regional genres of music such as payada.

=== Education ===
Apart from censoring intellectual works, the government attempted to restructure the national educational system with the goal of prioritizing "moral and civic education. In 1969, Professor Acosta y Lara took charge of the Secondary Education Council. He had a tight political alliance with the regime, who actively attacked student dissidents. In 1972, the controversial General Education law was passed, which stripped local education councils of their autonomy. Staff members in distinctive armbands began patrolling schools. Security personnel strictly monitored student activities and class discussions. Moreover, the state imposed a stringent syllabus, censored textbooks that attributed all major advancements in Uruguayan history made by civilians to members of the military, and evaluated students' on their ideological attachment to the regime. A computerized system provided students with a simple letter grade (A, B or C) according to their perceived level of loyalty.

After the return to democracy, some Uruguayan have called for establishing June 27 as a national day of remembrance that will compel citizens to defend truth, justice and transparency.

== Aftermath ==
The legacy of the dictatorship still gives rise to debate and controversy. In the negotiations that led to the Naval Club Pact, the military insisted that it would not compromise on the issues of complete amnesty for all their actions during the dictatorship. Many considered it unacceptable, but the military's refusal to negotiate without such protections led to the controversial enactment in 1986 of the Law on the Expiration of the Punitive Claims of the State (Spanish: Ley de Caducidad de la Pretensión Punitiva del Estado), which is still in force: in 1989 and 2009, Uruguayans voted in referendum twice to keep the law, which detractors heavily criticize.

The amnesty did not prevent calls for the prosecution of those covered by it. In December 2007 Gregorio Conrado Álvarez was indicted on charged of human rights abuses during the dictatorship in which he played a prominent role. On October 22, 2009, he was convicted and sentenced to 25 years in prison for 37 counts of murder and human rights violations; however, he was not in court to hear the verdict as he was ill. Alvarez died in prison on December 28, 2016, at the age of 91.

On 5 March 2010, Bordaberry was sentenced to 30 years in prison (the maximum allowed under Uruguayan law) for murder and of being the intellectual author of kidnappings and disappearances of political opponents of the regime. In ill health, Bordaberry was held under house arrest and died in 2011 at the age of 83.

== Documentary ==
- Clandestine political activity during the civic-military dictatorship is documented at Jorge Batlle: entre el cielo y el infierno, a 2024 documentary directed by Federico Lemos.

== See also ==
- Operation Condor
- Tupamaro National Liberation Movement
- 1973 Uruguayan coup d'état
- Expiry Law
