= Gregorio Conrado Álvarez =

Dictatorial President of Uruguay

Gregorio Álvarez
- Álvarez after his retirement

President of Uruguay Appointed by the military junta
- In office September 1, 1981 – February 12, 1985
- Preceded by: Aparicio Méndez
- Succeeded by: Rafael Addiego

Commander-in-Chief of the Uruguayan National Army
- In office February 1, 1978 – February 1, 1979
- Preceded by: Julio César Vadora
- Succeeded by: Luis Vicente Queirolo

Personal details
- Born: November 26, 1925 Lavalleja, Uruguay
- Died: December 28, 2016 (aged 91) Montevideo, Uruguay
- Party: Independent
- Spouse: María del Rosario Flores
- Profession: Military

Military service
- Allegiance: Uruguay
- Branch/service: Uruguayan Army
- Years of service: 1940–1979
- Rank: Lieutenant General

Gregorio Conrado Álvarez Armelino (26 November 1925 – 28 December 2016), also known as El Goyo, was an Uruguayan Army general and dictator who served as president of Uruguay from 1981 until 1985. He was the last surviving president of the civic-military dictatorship.

== Early life and military career ==
Álvarez was born in the Minas Department in 1925, later renamed Lavalleja in 1927. He entered the Uruguayan Military School in 1940 and graduated as an officer of the cavalry regiment (1946-59). He became chief of the Republican Guard in Montevideo in 1962. In 1971, he was promoted to general and then named chief of the Combined Armed Forces Command that ran the counterinsurgency operation against the Tupamaros (urban guerrillas).

When the military seized power in the 1973 Uruguayan coup d'état, Álvarez became permanent secretary of the new Consejo de Seguridad Nacional (National Security Council). In 1978, he became commander in chief of the army.

== President of Uruguay ==
After Uruguay voted for a return to democracy in a referendum in 1980, the Consejo de Seguridad Nacional named Álvarez transitional president on September 1, 1981. Continuing the repression against labor unions, he lost more popular support and also the support of the majority of the military. He agreed to the holding of legislative and presidential elections in November 1984, which had been preceded by internal party elections in 1982. When Julio María Sanguinetti of the Colorado Party won the presidential election, Álvarez resigned (on February 12, 1985). Rafael Addiego, president of the Supreme Court, then took office as interim president until Sanguinetti was sworn in on March 1. It might be added that while Alvarez did not look favourably upon Jorge Sanguinetti's candidacy in 1984, in his last years found a slightly unlikely defender in Sanguinetti, who argued that the amnesty relating to the dictatorship of 1973-1985 should not be set aside to prosecute even the more overtly military and unpalatable figures such as Álvarez, who were prominent during that period.

Álvarez's loss of support from the (relatively) more moderate members of the National Security Council in the run-up to the 1984 elections and his subsequent resignation invites scrutiny of the relationship between the Council, the military, and the constitutional party leaders. Some would argue that Álvarez's accession to the office of president in 1981 marked a high point of his power, which continued until his resignation. Others would argue that Álvarez's assumption of the permanent secretaryship of the National Security Council in 1973 marked the real point at which he gained what amounted to substantial executive powers. From whichever perspective, however, the fact remains that General Álvarez's public role as a military figure was set against the background of sizeable civilian participation in government in the 1973-1985. It is also the case that Álvarez was to some extent sidelined even during his presidency. In a country such as Uruguay which had some tradition of civilian rule by decree (e.g., during the presidency of Gabriel Terra, whose interior minister Alberto Demicheli later became president in 1976), it is arguably not accurate to equate rule by decree with military rule, although these may at times coincide.

=== Military title ===
Among the five individuals who became President of Uruguay in the civilian-military administration that lasted from 1973 to 1985, Álvarez, was, in fact, the only one to carry a military title. These five individuals were: Juan María Bordaberry, Alberto Demicheli, Aparicio Méndez, Álvarez, and Rafael Addiego. Some would argue that this fact is significant when assessing the degree of civilian participation in the regime. Others would argue that an unelected president backed by the military may sometimes merely constitute a cosmetic figurehead.

== Retirement and arrest ==
Although he was covered by a 1986 amnesty, since the election to the presidency of Tabaré Vázquez of the Frente Amplio in November 2004, there had been renewed calls for the prosecution of Álvarez for human rights abuses, for his part in Bordaberry's 1973 coup, and subsequent events.

Álvarez's residence in Montevideo became the focal point for demonstrators protesting the disappearance of opponents of the 1973–1985 civilian-military administration in July 2006. Defenders of such protests could argue that Álvarez symbolizes some of the least attractive aspects of the dictatorship of 1973–1985. On the other hand, it may be accurately asserted that since Álvarez was the only serving military individual to serve as president in the five presidencies of that period, such protests, whether justified or not, may serve to obscure the substantial civilian support for that administration by Colorado and Blanco politicians. From the point of view of those parties, therefore, such protests serve to deflect any focus upon the role exercised by prominent individuals in those parties during that regime.

In December 2007 Álvarez was indicted for alleged human rights abuses during the dictatorship in which he played a prominent role. On October 22, 2009, he was convicted and sentenced to 25 years in prison for 37 counts of murder and human rights violations; however, he was not in court to hear the verdict as he was ill. Alvarez died in prison on December 28, 2016, at the age of 91.

== See also ==
- Politics of Uruguay
- Vice President of Uruguay#Lack of inherent legal position
- Reynaldo Bignone, last surviving dictator of Argentina

Political offices
Preceded by Aparicio Méndez	President of Uruguay; 1981–1985	Succeeded by Rafael Addiego
