= 1984 Uruguayan general election =

General elections were held in Uruguay on 25 November 1984, the first since the 1973 coup. Since then the country had been run by a civic-military dictatorship. The electoral process was considered transparent and marked the end of the dictatorship.

The Colorado Party received more votes than any other party, resulting in one of its presidential candidates, Julio María Sanguinetti, was elected president as under the multi-candidate Ley de Lemas system in effect at the time, the highest-finishing candidate of the party that received the most votes was elected president. The Colorado Party also won the most seats in the Chamber of Deputies and Senate although not a majority.

The election was not without irregularities. A number of politicians were prohibited from running in the election.

== Results ==
Party	Presidential candidate	Votes	%	Seats			
Party	Presidential candidate	Votes	%	Chamber	+/–	Senate	+/–
Colorado Party	Julio María Sanguinetti	588,143	31.18	41	0	13	0
Colorado Party	Jorge Pacheco Areco	183,588	9.73	41	0	13	0
Colorado Party	al lema	5,970	0.32	41	0	13	0
Colorado Party	Total	777,701	41.23	41	0	13	0
National Party	Alberto Zumarán	554,443	29.39	35	–5	11	–1
National Party	Dardo Ortiz	83,237	4.41	35	–5	11	–1
National Party	Juan Carlos Payssé	21,644	1.15	35	–5	11	–1
National Party	al lema	1,449	0.08	35	–5	11	–1
National Party	Total	660,773	35.03	35	–5	11	–1
Broad Front	Juan José Crottogini	401,104	21.26	21	3	6	+1
Civic Union	Juan Vicente Chiarino	45,841	2.43	2	New	0	New
Workers' Party	Juan Vital Andrada	488	0.03	0	New	0	New
Patriotic Union	Néstor Bolentini	302	0.02	0	New	0	New
Socialist Convergence	Carlos Ceriotti	153	0.01	0	New	0	New
Total		1,886,362	100.00	99	0	30	0
Valid votes		1,886,362	97.69				
Invalid/blank votes		44,569	2.31				
Total votes		1,930,931	100.00				
Registered voters/turnout		2,197,503	87.87				
Source: Electoral Court
