= Civic Union (Uruguay) =

Civic Union Unión Cívica
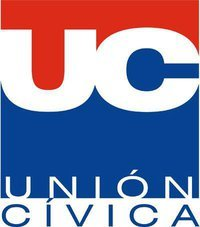
- Leader: Aldo Lamorte
- Founded: 1971
- Ideology: Christian democracy Conservatism
- National affiliation: National Party
- International affiliation: ODCA (Observer)

Website
- www.unioncivica.org.uy

Civic Union (Spanish: Unión Cívica) is a small Uruguayan political party.

It was founded in 1971 by dissidents of the Christian Democratic Party (PDC) who did not want to join the Frente Amplio alliance. The party delivered a minister of defense in 1985, after parliamentary democracy was restored to Uruguay.

The party participated in the 2004 presidential election. The Civic Union candidate Aldo Lamorte received 4,859 votes, placing 6th.

The party eventually merged into the National Party.

== See also ==
- Christian Democratic Party of Uruguay
- Politics of Uruguay
