= Women in Uruguay =

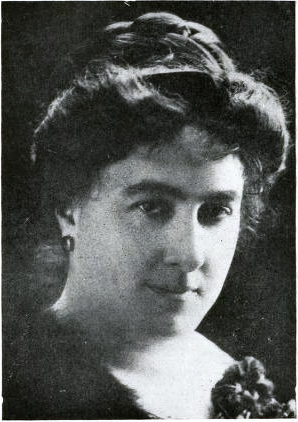
- Paulina Luisi was a prominent Uruguayan feminist leader, and also the first Uruguayan woman to graduate as a physician.

General statistics
- Maternal mortality (per 100,000): 10 (2024)
- Women in parliament: 22.3% (2026)
- Women over 25 with secondary education: 50.6% (2010)
- Women in labour force: 68% (2014)

Gender Inequality Index
- Value: 0.235 (2021)
- Rank: 58th out of 191

Global Gender Gap Index
- Value: 0.711 (2022)
- Rank: 72nd out of 146

Women in Uruguay are women who live in or are from the country. Their status has changed significantly throughout its history, and legislation aimed at advancing women’s rights began to be enacted in the early twentieth century. The country was one of the first in Latin America to grant women the right to vote, which was first exercised in national elections in 1938. Uruguayan legislation guarantees gender equality and provides protection against gender-based violence.

== History ==
=== Early feminist movement ===
Paulina Luisi was a central figure in the early feminist movement in Uruguay. In 1909, she became the first woman in the country to obtain a medical degree. During the early 20th century, she advocated for women’s civil and political rights, represented Uruguay at international women’s conferences, and travelled in Europe in support of gender equality. In 1919, she helped organize the national movement for women’s rights. In 1922, the Pan-American Conference of Women named her honorary vice president of the meeting. She remained active in the campaign for women’s suffrage and legal reform until women in Uruguay obtained full political rights.

=== 20th century ===
In 1997, by executive decree of President Julio María Sanguinetti, women were formally admitted to the officer training academies of the Uruguayan Armed Forces, with the first cohort entering in 1998. The reform enabled women to be commissioned as officers, including in combat branches. The previous year, in 1996, the first female students had been admitted to the Liceo Militar General Artigas, marking an initial step toward their full integration into the military education system.

== Domestic violence ==
The offence of domestic violence was incorporated into the Penal Code in 1995 with the approval of the Citizen Security Law. In 2002, the Law on the Eradication of Domestic Violence was enacted; it also established the National Advisory Council for the Fight against Domestic Violence and mandated the drafting of a National Plan to Combat Domestic Violence.

In 2017, the Law on Gender-Based Violence against Women was approved, introducing the offence of femicide into the Penal Code. The new legislation also eliminated provisions relating to so-called “crimes of passion,” following sustained political efforts that had begun in the early 2000s.

According to a 2018 United Nations study, Uruguay has the second-highest rate of killings of women by current or former partners in Latin America, after Dominican Republic.

== Reproductive rights and health ==
Uruguay’s abortion law is considered among the most liberal in Latin America. Although abortion was decriminalized for a brief period during the 1930s, it was not until 2012 that the country became the second in Latin America—after Cuba—to legalize elective abortion, permitting the procedure during the first 12 weeks of pregnancy.

As of 2024, the maternal mortality rate in Uruguay stood at 10 deaths per 100,000 live births, one of the lowest in the Americas. In the same year, the country recorded a total fertility rate (TFR) of 1.19 children per woman, reflecting a low level of fertility, well below the replacement rate of 2.1 children per woman.

== Women in politics ==
In July 1927, within the Cerro Chato referendum, women voted for the first time in Uruguay, albeit at the municipal level. Uruguayan women obtained the right to vote and to stand for elective office in 1932 following the approval of Law No. 8,927, making the country one of the first in the world—and the first in Latin America—to grant women full political citizenship rights. The 1934 Constitution subsequently incorporated women’s suffrage and established the principle of gender equality. Women first participated in national elections in 1938, in which Alfredo Baldomir Ferrari was elected president.

However, the first women elected to public office took their seats following the 1942 general elections. In those elections, Sofía Álvarez Vignoli of the Colorado Party was elected to the Senate, while Magdalena Antonelli Moreno of the Colorado Party and Julia Arévalo de Roche of the Communist Party were elected to the Chamber of Representatives. Isabel Pinto de Vidal also assumed a Senate seat after the resignation of incumbent senator Luis Matiaude, who left office to join the Council of Ministers under President Juan José de Amézaga.

Alba Roballo was the first woman to hold a ministerial position in Uruguay, assuming office as head of the Ministry of Culture in 1968. In 2000, the Women’s Bicameral Caucus (Bancada Bicameral Femenina) was established, bringing together female legislators from all political parties. In 2009, the Law on Women’s Political Participation was approved, introducing gender quotas in electoral lists for all national and departmental elections.

Since the 1990s, women have achieved increasing representation in Parliament. As of 2025, women hold 22.3% of parliamentary seats (29.2% in the Chamber of Representatives and 30% in the Senate), representing an increase compared to previous legislative terms. At the municipal level, the first women were elected as departmental intendants in 2010: Ana Olivera in Montevideo, Patricia Ayala in Artigas, and Adriana Peña in Lavalleja.

As of 2026, the office of President of Uruguay has not been held by a woman. In 2017, the country had its first female Vice President, Lucía Topolansky, who assumed office through constitutional succession. However, the first woman elected to the vice presidency was Beatriz Argimón—one of the founders of the Women’s Bicameral Caucus—in 2019. She was succeeded in 2025 by Carolina Cosse.

Sara Fons de Genta became the first woman to serve as a Justice of the Supreme Court of Uruguay in 1981, during the civic–military dictatorship. In 1985, Jacinta Balbela became the second woman appointed to the body and the first in the democratic period following the restoration of constitutional rule. In 2022, the Supreme Court attained a female majority for the first time in its history, with women comprising three of its five members.

== See also ==
- Uruguayan people
- Culture of Uruguay
- Human trafficking in Uruguay
