= Women's suffrage in Ecuador =

Women's suffrage in Ecuador was introduced into the Constitution in 1929. Ecuador was the first country in South America to introduce women's suffrage.

Women were explicitly excluded from suffrage in the Constitution of 1884. In the Constitution of 1897, women's rights were improved and the definition of a voter was made gender neutral, however it was still informally understood that women were not to exercise that right. The issue was raised by Matilde Hidalgo in 1924, which caused a public debate as well as a debate in Parliament. This prompted a process which started with the acceptance of her voting request by the Council of State, and ended in the introduction of women's suffrage in the new constitution of 1929.

In the 2017 elections, 5,427,261 women voted, compared to the 5,206,173 men.

== History ==
Until 1884, Ecuador's constitution placed no gender requirements for citizenship, though there were not cases of women trying to vote. In 1884 the constitution introduced gender restrictions. The citizenship was only extended to, "los varones que sepan leer y escribir y hayan cumplido 21 años o sean o hubieren sido casados", or "only men, 21 or older, who were literate and married or had been married". The inclusion of the restriction sparked a debate about whether or not there were women who wanted to vote, with the conservative majority in the Assembly expressing their stance.

The Constitution of 1897, written by a fairly liberal Assembly, withdrew all references of gender in regards to citizenship and placed an emphasis on improving the condition of women in society. The record of the Assembly debates includes the following note, dated June 3rd, 1897: “In the first days of the convention much has been done in order to grant women citizenship rights, including the ability to occupy any public office, such as the Department of State.” However, while in theory women could exercise all citizenship rights, it was commonly accepted at this time that they could be restricted in the electoral field.

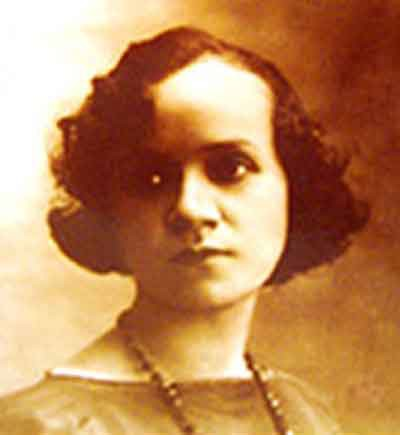
Matilde Hidalgo

The women's movement organized in the Sociedad Feminista Luz del Pichincha, which was founded in 1922 and did support women's suffrage.

=== Matilde Hidalgo ===
Matilde Hidalgo is known to be the first Ecuadorian woman to have completed University and a Doctorate degree. She graduated from the Central University of Ecuador. During the registration period for the legislative elections in 1924, she attempted to register in Machala to vote in the elections. However, designated officials prevented her from doing so because she was a woman.

Hidalgo made a formal request and used the Constitution of 1897 to argue that there were no restrictions regarding gender in having citizenship rights. Her request was passed to the Council of State, who eventually sided with her and allowed her to vote in the election on May 10, 1924. Thus, Hidalgo became the first Latin-American woman to vote in a national election.

The Council of State provided three types of arguments to accept Hidalgo’s application -- legal, social, and moral. Legally, according to the Constitution of 1897 and in the words of Government Minister Francisco Ortiz Ochoa “there is no legal objection to women registering to vote; so as a result, the aforementioned woman should be registered as she has requested for the use of her right”. In the social field, women were finally being considered members of society. They were also given the chance to use the law in isolated cases to be family estate owners. The moral arguments were based in the Council’s opinion that allowing women to vote would boost the country’s morale and that perhaps women might carry out their civic duties better than men.

The ruling was printed on the front page of an edition of the Guayaquil newspaper titled El Universo. It praised Hidalgo’s career and described her as “one of our highest peaks of the mountain of feminine mentality in Ecuador”. El Telegrafo also supported the decision of the Council of State, although other editorialists of El Universo showed their opposition to women’s suffrage. In Quito, the editorial El Dia was in favor of the ruling, while El Comercio was against it.

The majority of newspapers that were opposed the feminine vote claimed that women “were not prepared” to vote, or that should not be involved with politics or else “the home would not be able to function without them”. There were also many humorous messages about men becoming housekeepers due to their wives’ absence.

=== Ecuadorian Constitution of 1929 ===
The public debate that took place due to Matilde Hidalgo’s case was taken to the Assembly of 1928 -- which was also primarily liberal. It guaranteed women’s suffrage. Article 13 of the Constitution, published in the next year, established that every Ecuadorian citizen was a “man or woman, older than 21 years old, and could read and write”.

In the following months, the political parties started campaigns to promote female registration in the voter registries. The Conservative Party managed to attract the majority of women, claiming in a statement that “it is far from the truth that the female vote is harmful, rather the female vote would contribute to the moralizing of the elections”. The Liberal Party based their strategy on recalling that the Assembly that granted suffrage to these women was majority liberal.

=== Attempted Abolition ===
During the writing of the Constitution of Ecuador in 1937, Luis Felipe Borja, an Ecuadorian lawyer, proposed that explicit recognition of women’s suffrage be eliminated, claiming that it should be defined in electoral law and that citizenship was not solely defined by the right to vote. José María Velasco Ibarra opposed this argument and other attempts to reduce the electoral register in the Constitution. Borja argued that letting women vote was the same as allowing a priest to vote.

Borja’s stance was strongly rejected in the liberal circles of Guayaquil, although it was supported in Quito, with many writers and thinkers pointing out women’s lack of autonomy as a reason to forbid them from voting. Some notably liberal women also expressed a desire to restrict women’s suffrage. For example, during a public debate, the feminist Rosa Borja de Ycaza, argued that the right to vote was not that important and that “women’s suffrage, without any civic knowledge, only serves as a blind instrument in the greater national context.”

The electoral law finally withdrew restrictions on women’s suffrage and the authorities proclaimed that women could continue voting freely.

== Women's Political Participation ==
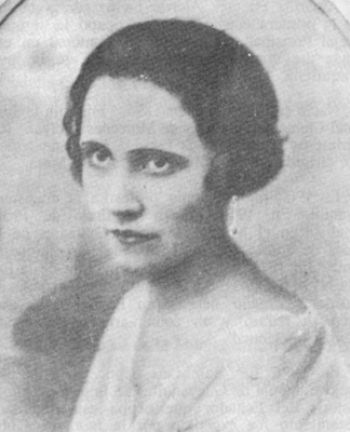
Amarilis Fuentes

Following the precedent set by Matilde Hidalgo regarding women's suffrage, several women from Ecuador’s coastal region began participating in electoral processes. In the canton elections of December 1924, a woman was elected as an alternate councilor of Guayaquil. However, the Julian Revolution the following year dissolved the newly elected municipal councils. In light of this, the Provisional Government Junta appointed the educator Amarilis Fuentes as councilor of Guayaquil in August 1925, making her the first Ecuadorian woman to hold a city council position.

In the 1930 elections, with women’s suffrage already guaranteed, Matilde Hidalgo and Bertha Valverde were elected as councilors of Machala and Guayaquil, respectively, becoming the first Ecuadorian women elected to public office. That year, 9,600 women registered to vote in the Sierra region and 2,455 in the Coastal region (including 56 from Machala and 770 from Guayaquil). Two years later, the total number of registered women had risen to 24,610—representing 12% of the electorate.

As of 2020, only six women had run as presidential candidates in Ecuador: Rosalía Arteaga and María Eugenia Lima in the 1998 elections, Ivonne Baki in the 2002 elections, Cynthia Viteri in the 2006 and 2017 elections, and Martha Roldós and Melba Jácome in the 2009 elections.

== See also ==
- 1927 Cerro Chato referendum
- Women's suffrage in Uruguay
