= Isabel Pinto de Vidal =

Uruguayan feminist lawyer and politician

- Born: December 13, 1885; Montevideo, Uruguay
- Died: 1969 (aged 83–84)
- Education: University of the Republic
- Occupations: Teacher; Lawyer; Politician; Activist
- Known for: Women's rights activism
- Political party: Colorado Party (Uruguay)
- Spouse: Angel Vidal
- Children: 2

Isabel Pinto de Vidal (Montevideo, December 13, 1885 – 1969) was a Uruguayan feminist lawyer and politician, and a member of the Colorado Party. Pinto de Vidal was a founding member of the National Women's Council of Uruguay(Consejo Nacional de Mujeres del Uruguay, CONAMU), a branch of the International Council of Women in Uruguay. Her activism alongside the works of feminists such as Paulina Luisi and Francisca Beretervide is credited for achieving women's rights in Uruguay.

After the women's suffrage in Uruguay, the Batllist sector of the Colorado Party, in which Pinto de Vidal was active, entered the electoral campaign of 1942. For the first time in Uruguayan history, women were elected to parliament, Sofía Álvarez Vignoli and Pinto de Vidal were the first senators. In addition, Pinto de Vidal was the first woman to preside over the General Assembly.

As one of the nine women to be named delegates and the only female delegate from Uruguay to the United Nations Conference on International Organization (UNCIO) in 1945, Pinto de Vidal worked to ensure women's rights were referenced throughout early documents and legal frameworks. She introduced an amendment that “representation and participation in the organs of the Organization shall be open to both men and women under the same conditions.” Pinto de Vidal's amendment was eventually included as Article 8 of the United Nations Charter.

== Early life ==
Pinto de Vidal was born as the daughter of Francisco Pinto and Maria Tellamon in Montevideo on December 13, 1885. She received a bachelor's degree in education in 1907 and in 1912, she graduated as a lawyer from the University of the Republic (Universidad de la República), becoming the second Uruguayan woman to earn a law degree. She had two children, Maria Isabel and Hebe, with her husband Angel Vidal.

== Political career ==
=== The National Women’s Council of Uruguay (CONAMU) ===
Pinto de Vidal joined the National Women's Council of Uruguay (CONAMU), after it was formed by Paulina Luisi in September 1916 and led its Labor Commission until she became the president, replacing Luisi, in 1921. The purpose of the council was to welcome all women to work on behalf of the moral, intellectual, material, economic and legal improvement of their sex. She worked in the organization until 1925. The National Women's Council of Uruguay was a national branch of the International Council of Women (ICW), originally founded in 1888. One of the first acts of CONAMU was a petition in favour of women's enfranchisement. In July 1917, CONAMU published the first issue of Acción Femenina, the organization's official monthly newsletter, in which Pinto de Vidal published many of her opinions.

In 1918, Pinto de Vidal, then president of the Labor Committee, spoke of plans to expand the committee's work to better include working-class women and to direct conferences more specifically at workers. However, CONAMU was known for being a committee of professional and elite women only and therefore, she later expressed that it wasn't the appropriate moment to embark upon such a project. The lack of socialist values in the organization began the disputes between Luisi and Pinto de Vidal.

One of the biggest successes of CONAMU came when they intervened on behalf of a group of telephone operators at the local company, La Uruguaya. The female operators complained they were working excessive hours and were receiving very low wages. At that point, CONAMU's National Office of Labour (Oficina Nacional del Trabajo) and its president, Pinto de Vidal, intervened and reached an agreement with the ‘La Uruguaya’’s management. The telephone operators stayed in touch with CONAMU, which served as a mediator between them and the company through 1922. Despite the victory, it became evident that the CONAMU's only source of power was moral pressure in specific cases, rather than any legislative or governmental authority.

However, working with CONAMU proved difficult for Pinto de Vidal who, in 1922, addressed their fourth annual meeting and confessed that she was having difficulty getting women to accept the feminist ideals. Even women with similar views as CONAMU were not keen in associating or supporting them, hence Pinto de Vidal assumed that CONAMU was having problems gaining new members. Before she left the presidency at the end of 1925, she stated the urgency of carrying out more propaganda on the council's behalf, suggesting to expand their targeted wealthy intellectual women and visit industries and offices to educate all women in the exercise of their rights. In her opinion, no woman would be passed over for lack of education, all women of goodwill could and should join CONAMU.

==== Conflicts with Paulina Luisi ====
Arguments increased between founder Luisi and CONAMU leader, Pinto de Vidal, due to their diverging political views. Luisi, a socialist, and Pinto de Vidal, a Batillist, partook in a power struggle between Batllistas and anti-Batllistas within the organization. Luisi's attempt to include socialist ideals and members to CONAMU fueled pre-existing tensions between Luisi and Pinto de Vidal, leading Luisi leaving CONAMU in 1921. Four years later, members of CONAMU requested Luisi to return, however, Luisi refused to return without a change in the organization's leadership. Later that year, Pinto de Vidal resigned from her position and a new board was established.

=== The Uruguayan Congress ===
In 1919, the Uruguayan Congress started to discuss topics including child abandonment, nutrition, protective services for children and regulations against the employment of boys and girls below the age of fifteen. At the time, lack of sufficient education or proper child care and hygiene led to very high infant mortality in Uruguay. Thus, Pinto de Vidal became an activist for the cause, lecturing in congress on the social causes of infant mortality. At the end of her presentation, congress ended with a dramatic final statement from the Uruguayan Chamber of Deputies on the state's duty to protect women and children as well as to regulate their working conditions.

=== The Colorado Party ===
Pinto de Vidal became a senator for the Colorado Party from the Batllista wing in 1942, the same year the first women were elected to parliament. Her election came shortly after Uruguayan women voted for the first time in 1938, despite women's suffrage being in effect since 1932. The parliament included two deputies, Julia Arévalo de Roche and Magdalena Antonelli Moreno, and two senators Sofía Álvarez Vignoli de Demichelli and Pinto de Vidal. She was re-elected as the Senator in both 1946 and 1950.

Pinto de Vidal was a member of the Colorado Party of Uruguay, a liberal political party. She was also a known Batillist. Both the party and the Batillist philosophy were created by José Batlle y Ordóñez, president of Uruguay (1903-1907 and 1911–1916) and emphasized nationalism and social, political, and economic development.

=== Delegate at the United Nations Conference on International Organization (UNCIO) ===
In 1945, Pinto de Vidal became one of the six women to be named full delegates of the United Nations Conference on International Organization (UNCIO). She was part of the Uruguayan delegation headed by President José Serrato. One of Pinto de Vidal's most significant achievements for the feminist movement was her participation in the drafting and signing of the United Nations Charter.

The female delegates at the UNCIO had conflicting views regarding the necessity to include explicit comments in the UN Charter about gender equality. The three non-Pan American delegates condemned that they [Pan American delegates] “felt it necessary to call attention frequently to women and their problems and to rub in the fact that they were women”, later expressing that “perhaps in the backward countries, where women have no vote and few rights of any kind, spectacular feminism may still be necessary.” Many North American female participants of the UNCIO warned that any explicit mention of “women’s rights” in the UN Charter would threaten social welfare measures for working women and be unnecessarily alienating. For Pinto de Vidal and the Pan-American delegates, adding an “equal rights” clause could contain commitments to social rights for women and provisions for motherhood, as they had seen the results of its inclusion in the Inter-American Conference on Problems of War and Peace (Conference of Chapultepec) in 1945. Seeing the division of views between the female delegates, Pinto de Vidal, who did not speak English, told Bertha Lutz, the Brazilian delegate, with these U.S. women, “No se saca nada” (We will gain nothing).

Pinto de Vidal contributed to the dispute by introducing an amendment from Uruguay that expressly asked for women to be included in all UN organizations. As she had to leave the conference early, Lutz and Minerva Bernardino were the crucial supporters of Pinto de Vidal's amendment in the committee meetings.

Debating Pinto de Vidal's amendment that “representation and participation in the organs of the Organization shall be open both to men and women under the same conditions,” male delegates from the United States, Britain, and Cuba believed that such an explicit clause was not necessary. After all, women were already participating in the UNCIO, so it was implicitly understood that women were not excluded from any UN organization and the Human rights declaration stated the equality of the genders. However, Lutz pointed out that although women had been allowed to participate in the UN Conference, they nevertheless composed only 1 percent of the delegates.

The debates led to the approval of the amendment the UN “shall place no restrictions on the eligibility of men and women to participate in any capacity and under conditions of equality in the principal and subsidiary organs”, to be added to the UN Charter. Even though the resolution's final wording was different and with less effective phrasing from Pinto de Vidal's proposal, the conference participants acknowledged that this was an achievement of the Pan-American feminist movement.

== Honours ==
Pinto de Vidal was one of the honorees, among other women in the field of the United Nations, of the "Uruguayan Women in the United Nations Multilateral System: Yesterday and Today" exhibition for her contributions to the consolidation of the multilateral system and international peace.

She is also remembered along with other Uruguayan women rights activists in the public space project, “Las Pioneras” in Montevideo, created by the Municipality of Montevideo, with the Society of Architects of Uruguay (Sociedad de Arquitectos del Uruguay) and the Faculty of Architecture from the University of the Republic.
