= Polish Uruguayans =

Polish Uruguayans Polscy-Urugwajczycy Polaco-Uruguayos
Total population
- 497-5,000 Poles reside in Uruguay; 50,000–70,000 Uruguayans with Polish ancestry (%4) of Uruguay's population

Regions with significant populations
- Montevideo

Languages
- Spanish, with minority speaking Polish

Religion
- Roman Catholicism and Judaism

Related ethnic groups
- Polish Argentine, Polish Brazilians, Polish Chileans, White Latin Americans

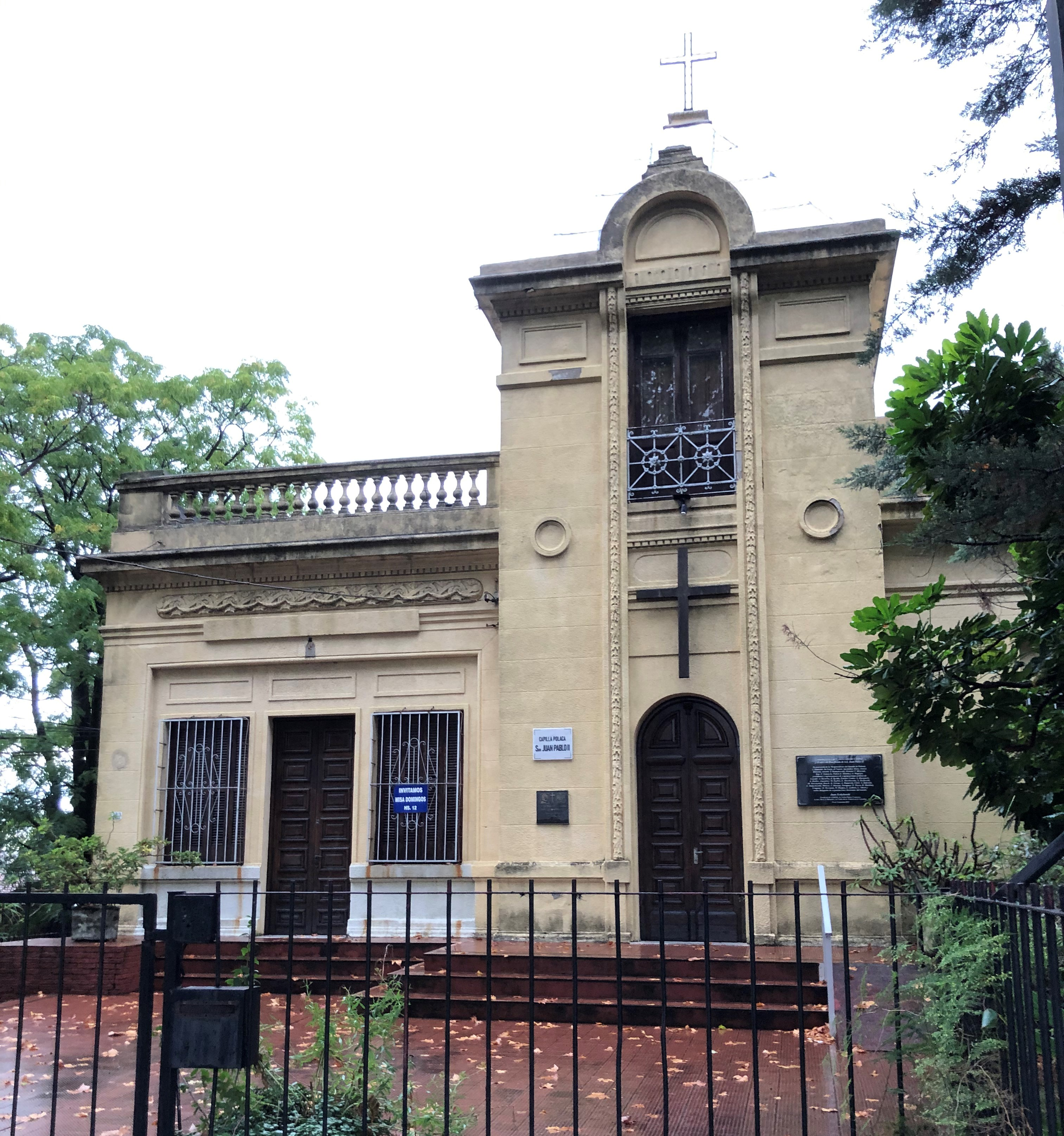
Ioannes Paulus II Chapel in Montevideo.

A Polish Uruguayan is a Uruguayan citizen of full or partial Polish ancestry.

The Polish arrived in Uruguay at the end of the 19th century. The most recent figure is from the 2011 Uruguayan census, which revealed 497 people who declared Poland as their country of birth. Other sources claim around 5,000 Poles in Uruguay. Similar to neighboring country Argentina, often, Poles came when the Germans and the Russians ruled Poland and so were known as "Germans" or "Russians".

Most Polish Uruguayans belong to the Roman Catholic Church; they have their own chapel in the Atahualpa neighbourhood. There is also a significant Polish Jewish minority.

Polish Uruguayans have two important institutions: the Polish Society Marshal Joseph Pilsudsky (Spanish: Sociedad Polonesa Mariscal José Pilsudski), established in 1915, and the Uruguayan Polish Union (Spanish: Unión Polono Uruguaya), established in 1935, both associated with USOPAL.

== Notable Polish Uruguayans ==
Arts

- José Serebrier (born 1938), conductor and composer
- Daniel Hendler (born 1976), film, television, and theatre actor
- Jan Łukasiewicz (1844-1906), architect

Business

- Jan Kobylański (1923-2019), businessman
- Ida Holz (born 1935), engineer, computer scientist, professor, and researcher
- Chil Rajchman (1914-2004), Holocaust survivor and entrepreneur
- Pedro Steinbruch, entrepreneur

Sports

- Eduardo Dluzniewski (born 1952), football referee
- Daniel Fedorczuk (born 1976), football referee
- Ariel Krasouski (born 1958), footballer
- Francisco Majewski (1939–2012), footballer
- Juan Masnik (1943–2021), footballer
- Ladislao Mazurkiewicz (1945–2013), footballer
- Hernán Petryk (born 1994), footballer
- Gustavo Szczygielski (born 1967), basketball player
- Marcelo Tulbovitz (born 1961), football trainer
- Matías Vitkieviez (born 1985), footballer

Other Professions

- The sisters Paulina, Luisa, Inés, and Clotilde Luisi, prominent feminists, all daughters of Josefina Janicki (of Polish descent)
- Freddy Nieuchowicz (born 1968), radio host and entertainer known by his stage name Orlando Petinatti
- Wacław Radecki (1887-1953), psychological professor
- Camila Rajchman (born 1994), singer and television personality
- Lucía Topolansky (born 1944), politician and First Lady (2010-2015)

== See also ==
- Poland–Uruguay relations
- Polish diaspora
- Immigration to Uruguay
