= Cerro Chato (disambiguation) =

Cerro Chato is a town in central Uruguay, divided in three parts belonging to different Departments.

Cerro Chato may also refer to:

== Geography ==
- Cerro Chato, Paysandú, a town in Paysandú Department, Uruguay
- Chato Volcano, an inactive volcano in Costa Rica

== Politics ==
- 1927 Cerro Chato referendum, a plebiscite in which, for the very first time in Latin America, women were legally allowed to vote
