= Sofía Álvarez Vignoli =

Uruguayan jurist

- Born: Sofía Álvarez Vignoli; 10 August 1899; Montevideo, Uruguay
- Died: 12 May 1986 (aged 86)
- Occupations: Politician, lawyer
- Spouse: Alberto Demicheli (1896–1980)
- Children: Julio Alberto (1938–1975); María Adelina

Sofía Álvarez Vignoli (10 August 1899 – 12 May 1986) was a Uruguayan jurist and briefly First Lady of Uruguay, who was active in the struggle to achieve Women's Suffrage.

== Background ==
She met her future husband Dr. Alberto Demicheli when they were both law students in Montevideo. On completion of the course, they married and subsequently had two children Julio Alberto (1938–1975) and María Adelina Demicheli Alvarez.

She was active in campaigning for women's suffrage in Uruguay, which was achieved in 1932 (although women had already participated in some local elections in Uruguay). She was the main force behind the incorporation of Children's Rights into Uruguayan Law and wrote a book on Women's Civil Rights in 1946.

Her husband Dr. Alberto Demicheli served as interior minister in the 1930s and was President of Uruguay as an interim measure in 1976.

== Diplomatic missions ==
Her diplomatic activity occurred mainly under President Gabriel Terra (1933–1938). In the elections at the end of his term, the inherent political differences between the suffragettes emerged strongly. Álvarez Vignoli de Demicheli headed the group which supported the conservative dictator to whom prestigious feminists, such as sisters Paulina y Luisa Luisi, were opposed.

She co-signed on behalf of Uruguay the Convention on Extradition (Inter-American) of December 26, 1933, the Convention on the Nationality of Women (Inter-American) of December 26, 1933 and the Montevideo Convention on the Rights and Duties of States of 26 December 1933. She represented Uruguay in 1935 at an Interamerican Conference of Women in Montevideo and subsequently, in 1963, the 3rd Extraordinary Assembly of the Interamerican Commission of Women in Washington.

== Senator ==
In 1942, Uruguayan women entered Parliament for the first time. Álvarez Vignoli de Demicheli and Isabel Pinto de Vidal became the first female senators, not only of Uruguay, but of the whole Continent of South America. At the same time, Julia Arévalo de Roche and Magdalena Antonelli Moreno were elected deputies.

== See also ==
- List of political families#Uruguay

== Bibliography ==
- Derechos civiles de la mujer Biblioteca Manuel Galvez, Montevideo : Alfa y Omega, 1946, 480 pp
