= Uruguayan Women's Suffrage Alliance =

Affiliate of International women's suffrage alliance (IWSA)

The Uruguayan Women's Suffrage Alliance (Alianza Uruguaya por el Sufragio Femenino, or simply Alianza) was a Uruguayan women's suffrage organization. The Alianza was cofounded by Paulina Luisi in August 1919, breaking away from CONAMU to concentrate on pressing for women's suffrage. It was an affiliate of the International Women's Suffrage Alliance (IWSA).

In 1929 the Alianza restated its programme, placing female legal equality as its number one goal, and relegating female suffrage to fifth place in its list of priorities.
