= List of ambassadors of Uruguay to Poland =

Coordinates: 52.207247°N 21.017769°E

Ambassador of Uruguay to Poland Uruguayan Embassy in Warsaw
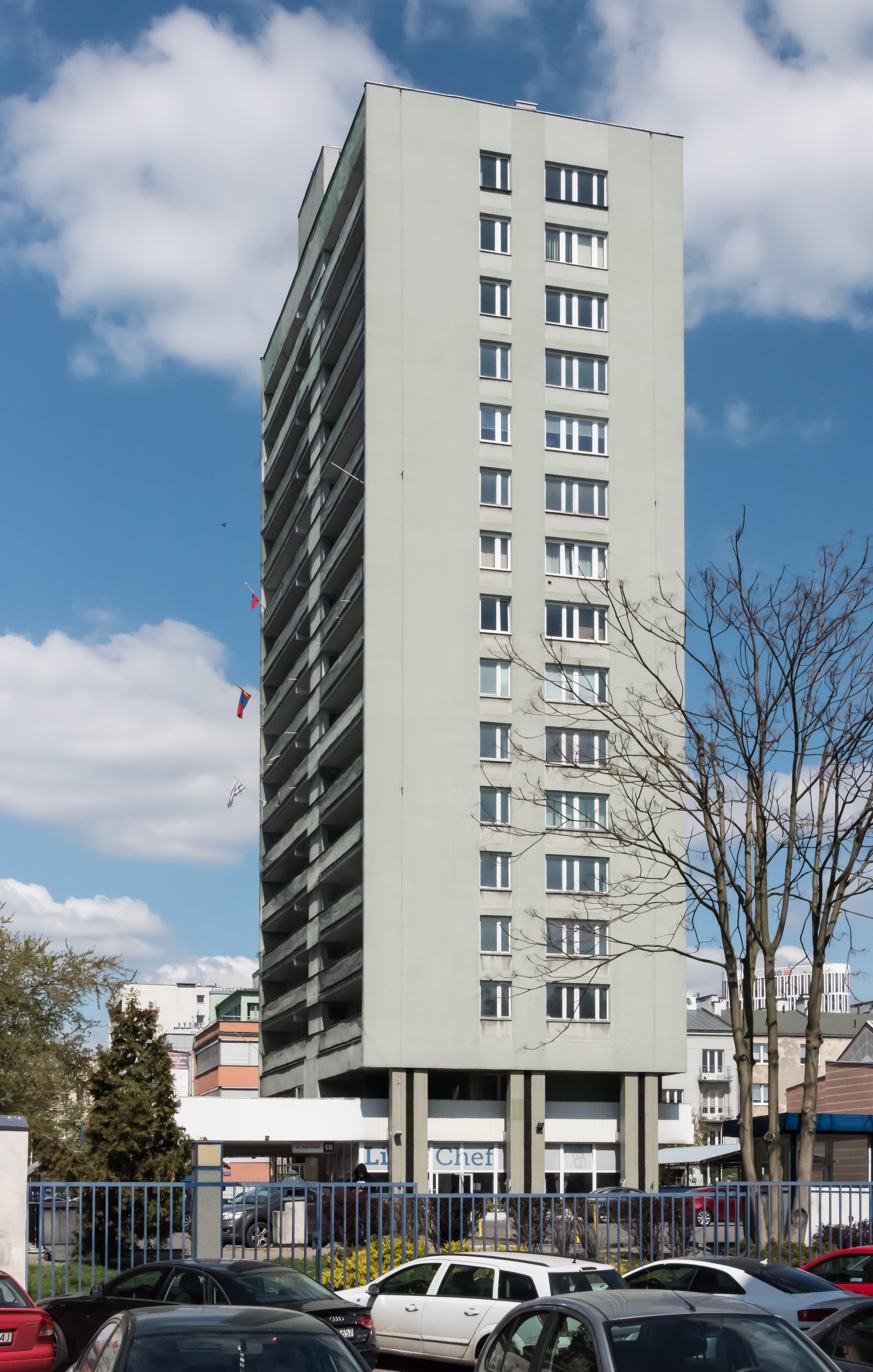
- Incumbent; Pablo Ernesto Scheiner Correa since February 16, 2015
- Inaugural holder: Luis Garabelli
- Formation: March 9, 1923

The Uruguayan ambassador in Warsaw is the official representative of the Government in Montevideo to the Government of Poland.

== List of representatives ==
| Diplomatic agrément/Diplomatic accreditation | Ambassador | Observations | List of presidents of Uruguay | List of heads of state of Poland | Term end |
|---|---|---|---|---|---|
| March 9, 1923 | Luis Garabelli | | José Serrato | Stanisław Wojciechowski | |
| May 25, 1932 | Eliseo Ricardo Gómez | | Gabriel Terra | Ignacy Mościcki | |
| 1945 | César Montero de Bustamente | Chargé d'affaires | Juan José de Amézaga | Bolesław Bierut | |
| June 10, 1965 | Joaąuin A. Costanzo | Chargé d'affaires | Washington Beltrán | Edward Ochab | |
| October 30, 1967 | Alfredo Bianchi | Chargé d'affaires | Óscar Diego Gestido | Edward Ochab | |
| May 26, 1970 | Horacio Herrera Mendez | | Jorge Pacheco Areco | Józef Cyrankiewicz | |
| April 30, 1977 | Heber Martinez Muscio | Chargé d'affaires | Aparicio Méndez | Henryk Jabłoński | |
| September 7, 1978 | Santos Jesus Laureiro Soria | | Aparicio Méndez | Henryk Jabłoński | |
| June 16, 1982 | Sergio Gutiérrez | | Gregorio Álvarez | Henryk Jabłoński | |
| July 16, 1987 | Augusto Heber Wild Ayçaguer | ( † 17 de marzo de 2016) | Julio María Sanguinetti | Wojciech Jaruzelski | |
| July 23, 1992 | Luis Alberto Verdier | Chargé d'affaires | Luis Alberto Lacalle | Lech Wałęsa | |
| December 9, 1992 | Marinés Benavides | Chargé d'affaires | Luis Alberto Lacalle | Lech Wałęsa | |
| April 13, 1994 | Daniel Pérez del Castillo | | Luis Alberto Lacalle | Lech Wałęsa | |
| August 31, 1999 | Carlos Daniel Amorin Tenconi | | Julio María Sanguinetti | Aleksander Kwaśniewski | |
| December 13, 2004 | Luis Alfredo Sica Bergara | | Jorge Batlle Ibáñez | Aleksander Kwaśniewski | |
| October 3, 2006 | María José Vignone Nieto | Chargé d'affaires | Tabaré Vázquez | Lech Kaczyński | |
| March 20, 2003 | Carlos Amorín Tenconi | | Jorge Batlle Ibáñez | Aleksander Kwaśniewski | |
| 2010 | Julio Giambruno Viana | | José Mujica | Bronisław Komorowski | |
| February 16, 2015 | Pablo Ernesto Scheiner Correa | | José Mujica | Bronisław Komorowski | |
