= José María Podestá =

Uruguayan writer (1898–1986)

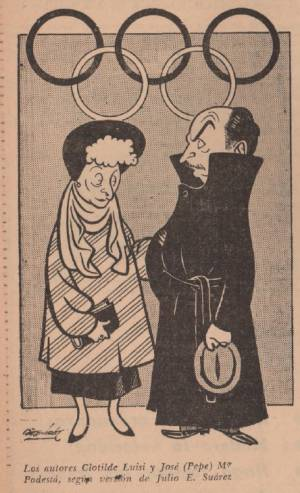
- Clotilde Luisi with José María Podestá. Caricature of Peloduro.
- Born: José María Santiago Podestá Oyazbehere; 1898; Montevideo, Uruguay
- Died: 1986 (aged 87–88)
- Occupation: Writer

José María Santiago Podestá Oyazbehere (30 March 1898 – 1986) was a Uruguayan journalist, theatre critic and writer.

His work was part of the literature event in the art competition at the 1948 Summer Olympics, where he took part alongside his wife, Clotilde Luisi.
