= Women's suffrage in Uruguay =

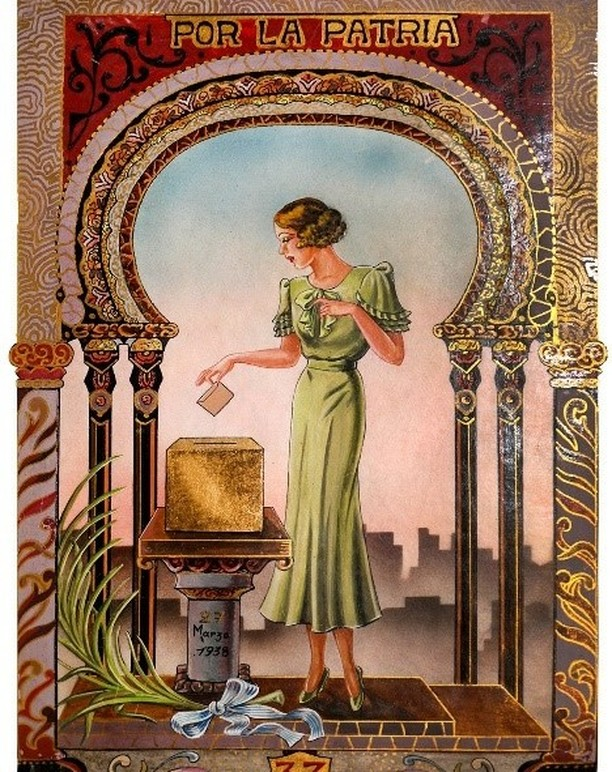
Commemorative poster from 1938.

Women's suffrage in Uruguay was practically established between 1917 and 1938. Women's suffrage was announced as a principle in the Constitution of Uruguay of 1917, and declared as law in a decree of 1932. The first national election in which women voted was the 1938 Uruguayan general election.

== History ==
Uruguay's 1917 Constitution announced the general right of women to vote and hold office at local and national levels in Uruguay. Despite the Constitution affording women equal political and civil rights, to become law, women's suffrage required a two-thirds majority in each legislative house. In 1919 the feminist Paulina Luisi established the Uruguayan Women's Suffrage Alliance, affiliated to the International Women's Suffrage Alliance, to push for women's suffrage.

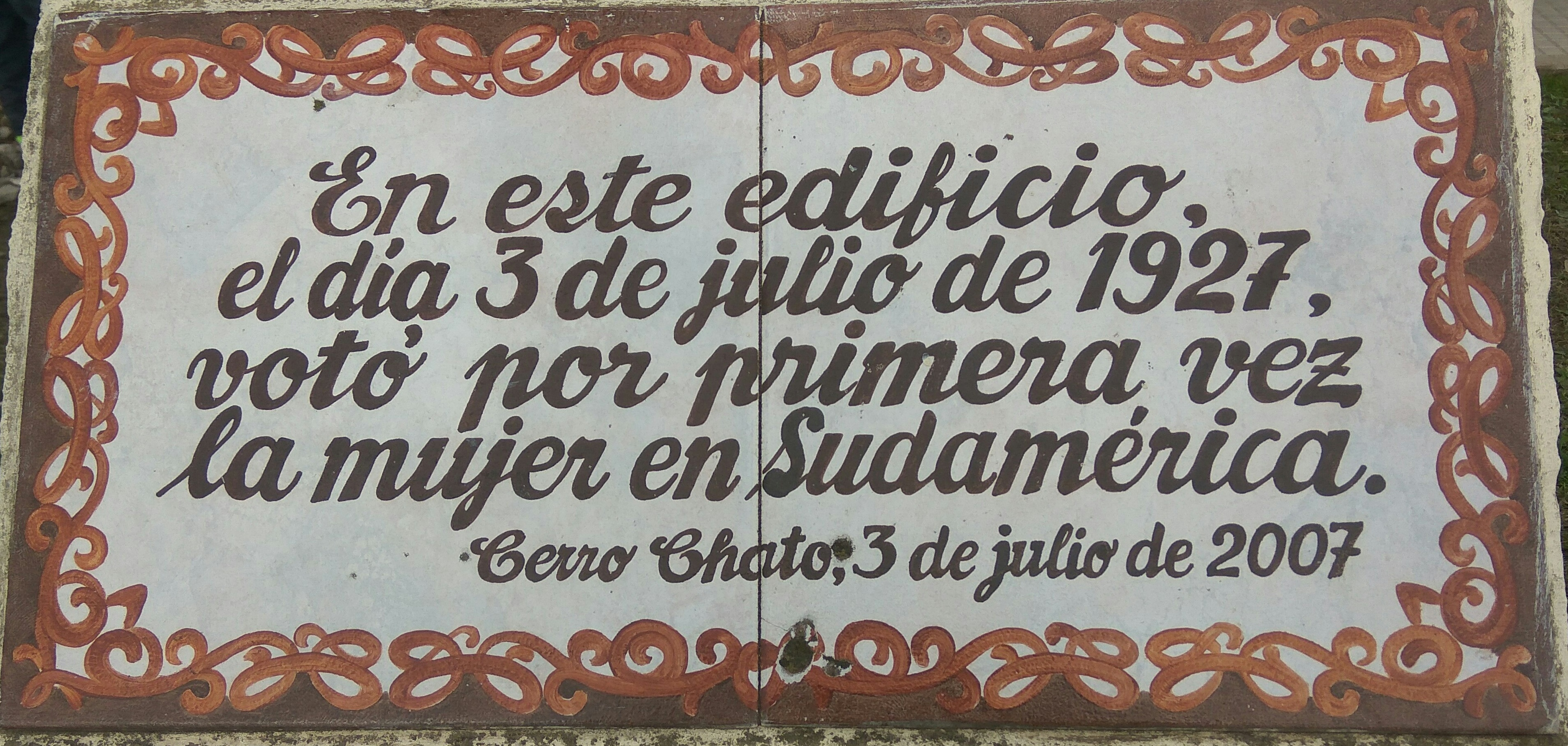
A plaque commemorating women voting in Uruguay on July 3, 1927. Though claiming that this was the first instance of women voting in South America, there are earlier reports of women voting in Ecuador.

At the municipal level, women were allowed to vote in Uruguay in July 1927 within the plebiscite zone of Cerro Chato. This has been commemorated as the first time that women cast votes in Uruguay.

A December 16, 1932 decree declared women's eligibility to vote in the national elections scheduled for 1934. Though Gabriel Terra's 1933 coup resulted in those elections not being held, the new 1934 constitution reaffirmed that "national citizens are all men and women born within the nation [...] every citizen is as such a voter and entitled to hold office". The first national election in which women participated was the 1938 Uruguayan general election.

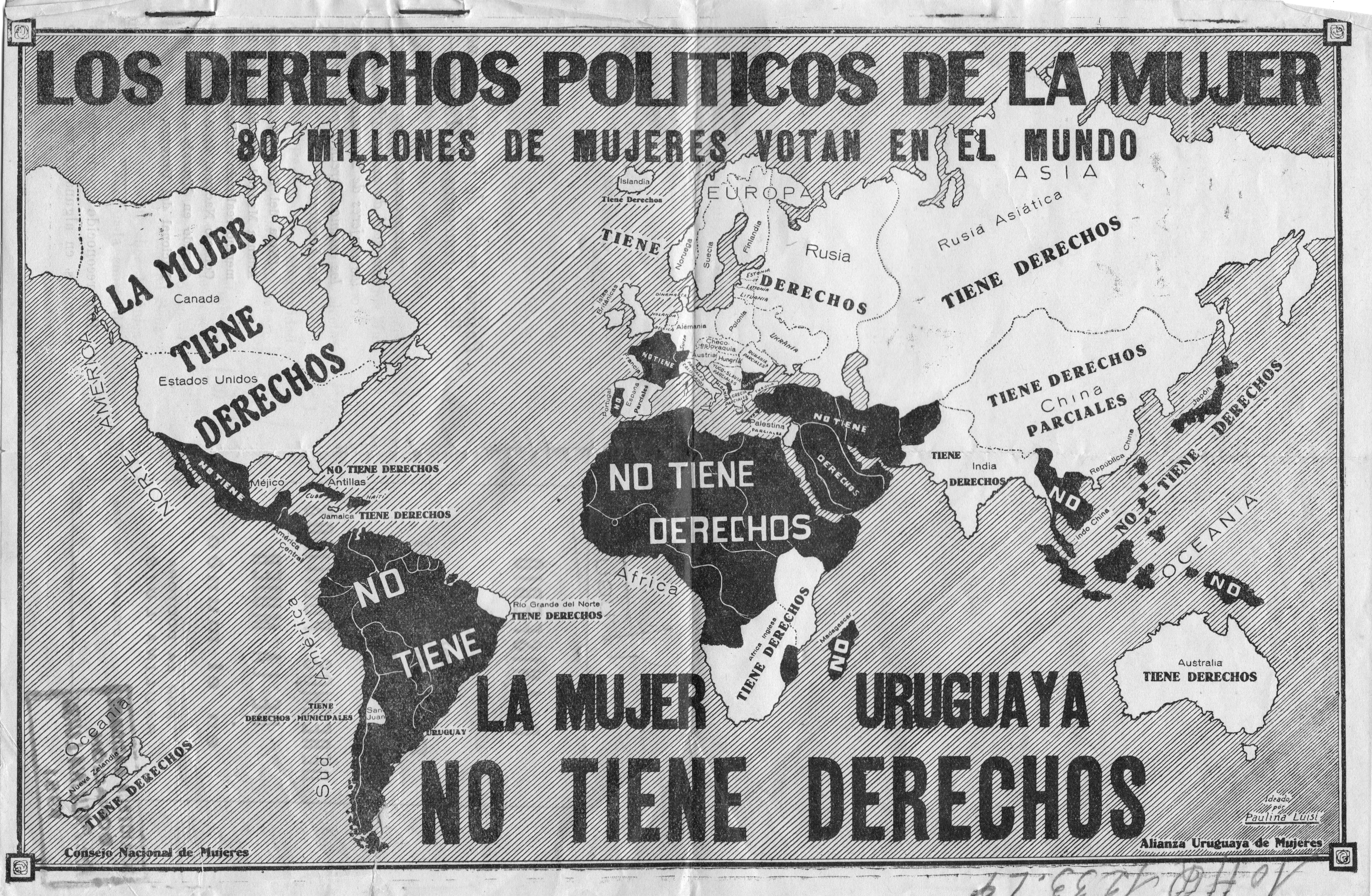
A 1929 map color-coded to indicate women's suffrage and noting "Uruguayan Women Do Not Have Rights".

== See also ==
- 1927 Cerro Chato referendum
- Cerro Chato
- Uruguayan Women's Suffrage Alliance
