= Frances Benedict Stewart =

Chilean born American sociologist, pacifist, feminist, teacher and Bahá′í missionary

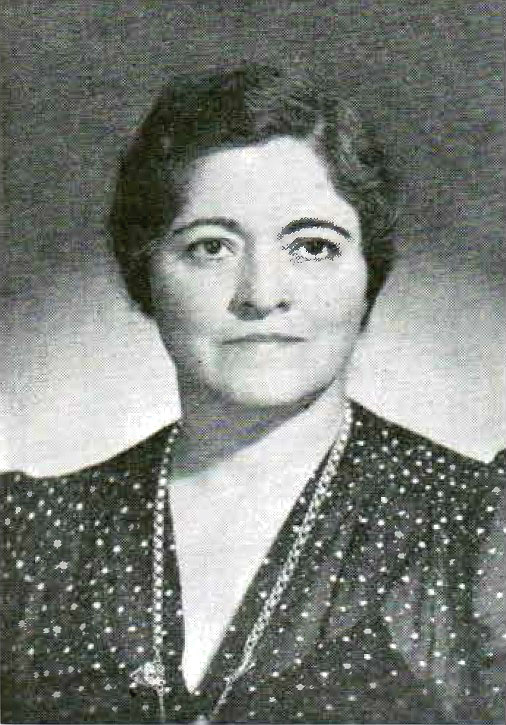
- Frances Benedict Stewart in 1950
- Born: Chile
- Occupations: sociologist, pacifist, feminist, teacher and Bahá′í pioneer
- Organization: Women's International League for Peace and Freedom

Frances Benedict Stewart was a Chilean-born American citizen. She was a sociologist, pacifist, feminist, teacher and Bahá′í pioneer. From the late 1920s to 1958, she was the spokesperson for the Baháʼí Faith in the Spanish-speaking Caribbean, northern South America and in Central America. She performed missionary work throughout the region for nearly 40 years and established numerous assemblies for the faith.

== Biography ==
Frances Benedict Stewart was of Chilean birth and was born to pioneer parents of the Bahá′í Faith. She was a sociologist and as a native Spanish speaker, served as liaison and translator for several feminist and pacifist organizations. As early as 1928, she was serving as a missionary and teacher in Latin America and in 1936 she was a delegate at the Baháʼí annual convention in Buenos Aires, Argentina. After the convention, she traveled on to teach in Rio de Janeiro and São Paulo, Brazil.

She was teaching abroad again in 1937 and by 1938 she was secretary of the Bahá′í Inter-American Committee—tasked with coordinating Bahá′í activities related to the Ten Year Crusade in Latin America—and a spokesperson for the faith in all Latin American centers of the West Indies, all of northern South America and in Central America. In 1939, Stewart was working to establish a Baháʼí Spiritual Assembly in Argentina and from there she went to Montevideo, Uruguay where she was interviewed by Uruguayan feminist Paulina Luisi on Radio Femenina, the first all-woman radio format in the Western Hemisphere.

She was active in the Women's International League for Peace and Freedom (WILPF) in the late 1930s traveling to Mexico City to attend an educational conference for WILPF and assess the possibility of re-establishing the organization in Mexico with feminists there. She was also a delegate for WILPF at the Primer Congreso Interamericano de Mujeres, held in Guatemala City, Guatemala in 1947.

In 1940, Stewart left the US to spend a year in South America, beginning in Mexico and continuing on to El Salvador, Guatemala, and Honduras, returning to Utica, New York, in October 1941 where she prepared translations of the Tablet of Ahmad and the Prayer Books into Spanish.

Throughout the 1950s, Stewart continued her missionary teaching in Puerto Rico in 1951, on Juan Fernández Islands, Chile in 1955, and various other locations until 1958, when her administrative rights as a member of the Baháʼí Faith community were removed. In 1961, Stewart was living in Argentina and was declared a Covenant-breaker—a form of excommunication in the Baháʼí Faith—by the Hands of the Cause of God, then the temporary leaders of the international Baháʼí community.

== See also ==
- List of peace activists

== Sources ==
- Ehrick, Christine (23 July 2015). Radio and the Gendered Soundscape: Women and Broadcasting in Argentina and Uruguay, 1930–1950. New York, New York: Cambridge University Press. ISBN 978-1-107-07956-4.
- Khan, Janet A. (2009). Heritage of Light: The Spiritual Destiny of America. Wilmette, Illinois: Baha'i Publishing Trust. ISBN 978-1-931847-73-5.
- Threlkeld, Megan (2014). Pan American Women: U.S. Internationalists and Revolutionary Mexico. Philadelphia, Pennsylvania: University of Pennsylvania Press. ISBN 978-0-8122-4633-9.
