= Poland–Uruguay relations =

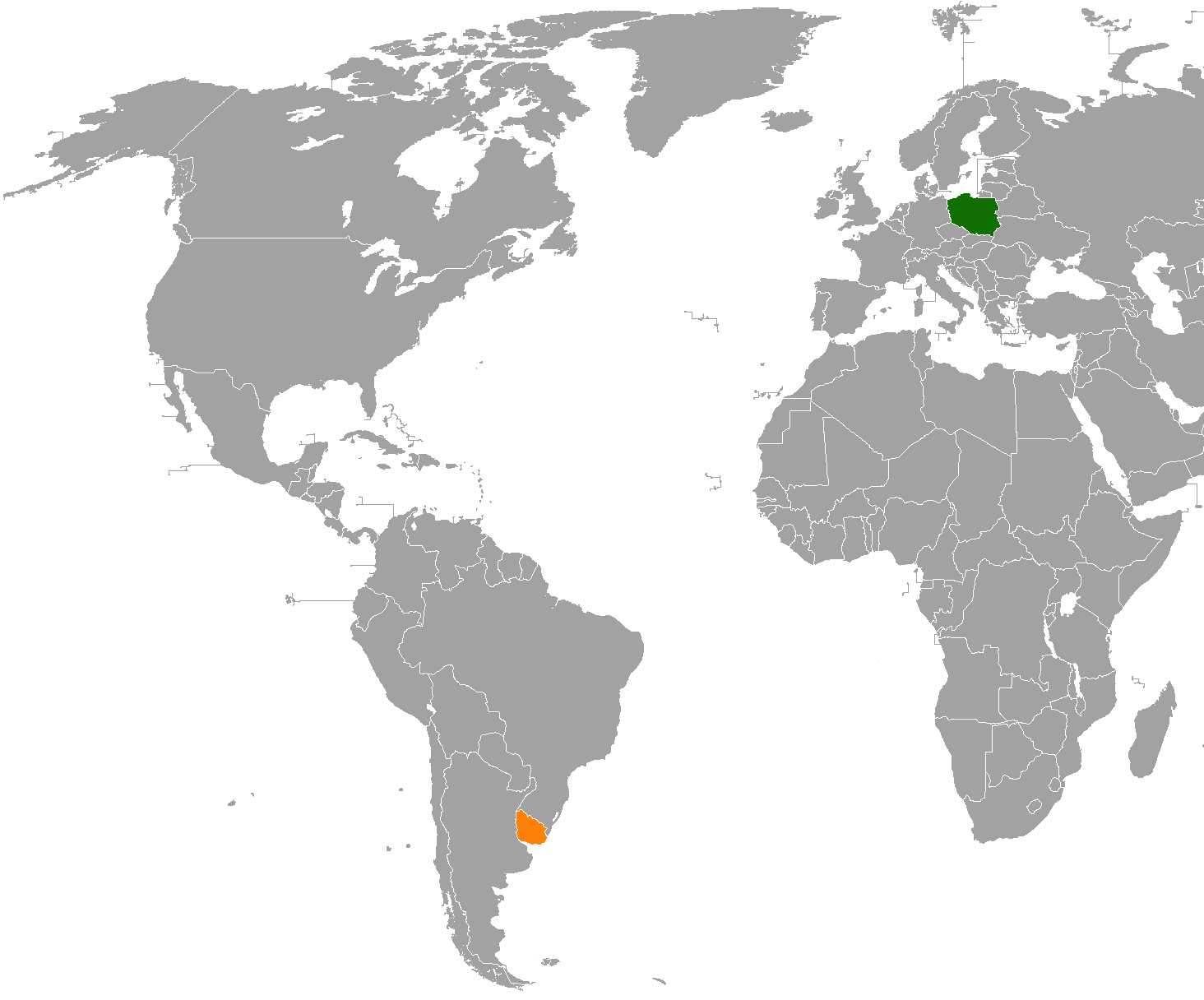
- Poland: Uruguay

Poland–Uruguay relations are foreign relations between Poland and Uruguay. Poland is accredited to Uruguay through its embassy in Buenos Aires, Argentina and maintains an honorary consulate in Montevideo, while and a Uruguay is accredited to Poland through its embassy in Berlin, Germany. Both nations are members of the United Nations.

== History ==
In 1847, Polish diplomat Alexandre Colonna-Walewski paid a visit to Uruguay during a visit to South America. The first Polish migrants to Uruguay arrived in the mid-19th century. In the years before World War I, Uruguay received working-class migrants from Poland.

Diplomatic relations between Poland and Uruguay were established on 22 July 1920. Soon afterwards, Polish envoy Count Ksawery Franciszek Orłowski presented his credentials to the Uruguayan President Baltasar Brum. Between 1922 and 1936 the Polish diplomatic legation in Buenos Aires was accredited for relations with Uruguay.

During World War II, César Montero Bustamante was put in-charge of on behalf of the Ministry of Foreign Affairs of Uruguay for relations with the Polish government-in-exile in London. Soon after the war, relations between both nations steadily improved. In 1995, former Polish President Lech Wałęsa paid a visit to Uruguay. In 2002, Uruguayan Foreign Minister Didier Opertti paid an official visit to Poland and met with Polish President Aleksander Kwaśniewski. In 2006, Uruguayan Foreign Minister Belela Herrera paid a visit to Poland. In 2007, Polish Foreign Minister Witold Waszczykowski paid a visit to Uruguay.

In 2010, Poland and Uruguay celebrated 90 years of diplomatic relations. In 2021, Uruguay closed its embassy in Warsaw due to budget restraints.

== Agreements ==
Both nations have signed several bilateral agreements, such as a Trade Treaty (1938); Agreement on Cultural, Scientific and Educational Cooperation (1989); Agreement on the Reciprocal Promotion of Investments (1991); Agreement on the Elimination of Visa Requirements (1991); Agreement on the avoidance of Double-Taxation (1991) and an Agreement on Joint Cooperation between both nations' Ministries of Foreign Affairs (2010).

== Diplomatic Missions ==
- Poland is accredited to Uruguay from its embassy in Buenos Aires, Argentina and maintains an honorary consulate in Montevideo.
- Uruguay is accredited to Poland from its embassy in Berlin, Germany.

== See also ==
- Foreign relations of Poland
- Foreign relations of Uruguay
- Polish Uruguayans

== Bibliography ==
- Albanell Mac Coll, Eduardo. Polonia en el Uruguay. Montevideo: La Voz de Polonia, 1945.
