= Ángel Duarte Valverde =

Ecuadorian politician (1934–2024)

Governor of Guayas Province
- In office 1992–1995
- Preceded by: Oswaldo Molestina
- Succeeded by: Antonio Andretta Arizaga

Member of the National Congress of Ecuador for Guayas
- In office 1986–1988

Minister of Agriculture
- In office 25 March 1969 – 4 February 1970
- Preceded by: Fausto Cordovez
- Succeeded by: Rubén Espinoza Román

Personal details
- Born: 29 October 1934; Guayaquil, Ecuador
- Died: 2 March 2024 (aged 89); Guayaquil, Ecuador
- Political party: CFP
- Education: University of Guayaquil
- Occupation: Lawyer

Ángel Duarte Valverde (29 October 1934 – 2 March 2024) was an Ecuadorian lawyer and politician.

== Life ==
He was born in 1934. His mother, Bertha Valverde, made history as the first Ecuadorian woman to be elected to office in 1930.

A member of the Concentration of People's Forces, he served in the National Congress from 1986 to 1988 and was governor of Guayas Province from 1992 to 1995. He was also a presidential candidate in 1984 and 1988.

Duarte died in Guayaquil on 2 March 2024, at the age of 89.
