= Radio Femenina =

Former radio station in Montevideo, Uruguay

Radio Femenina (CX48)
Montevideo; Uruguay
- Frequency: 1490 kHz

Programming
- Format: Women's programming

Ownership
- Owner: Filfueira, Cánepa y Cía

History
- First air date: October 1935
- Last air date: 1973

Radio Femenina CX48, 1490 AM, was a radio station in Montevideo, Uruguay, which went on the air in October 1935, making it the first all-women format in the western hemisphere. It featuring programming by and for women, but initially was begun as an experiment with the specific focus of making women consumers. Later, women used it to gain a voice in educational and cultural issues and programming featured leading Uruguayan intellectuals and activists.

In the earliest broadcasts, at 2 p.m., the lilting voice of "Ana María" read poems by Amado Nervo or Gustavo Adolfo Bécquer, "Mrs. Gilda" shared housekeeping tips, or music by Mercedes Simone or Charlo. These were typical broadcasts when the original owners Vásquez and Cía had the station, but it changed ownership in 1939, with the new owners listed as Filfueira, Cánepa and Cía. From the time ownership changed, the format did as well. Around this time, it featured women, like Paulina Luisi, Uruguay's most prominent feminist, and guests from other feminist and pacifist movements like Frances Benedict Stewart. In addition to programs on civil and political rights, Radio Femenina also broadcast political ideology, including both pro-Socialist and anti-fascist programs.

FBI surveillance indicated in the early 1940s that the station was owned by Cánepa who also owned Radio Uruguay and was a reported Nazi sympathizer. Until 1943, the station continued to operate and was still listed as pro-Ally through 1942. The blacklist which was implemented against Radio Femenina appeared to be as a result of ownership, rather than program content.

The station regained its license in 1945, though its market share was small compared to other stations. It was still active in 1972 but did not survive the 1973 dictatorship.

== Sources ==
- Ehrick, Christine (2015). Radio and the Gendered Soundscape: Women and Broadcasting in Argentina and Uruguay, 1930–1950. New York: Cambridge University Press. ISBN 978-1-107-07956-4.
