= Alberto Demicheli =

Uruguayan politician, lawyer, historian, journalist, pilot and military officer

Captain Alberto Demicheli
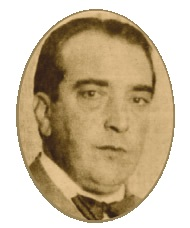
- Demicheli, c. 1930s

Interim President de facto of Uruguay
- 2nd President of the Civic-Military Dictatorship
- In office 12 June – 1 September 1976
- Vice President: Vacant
- Preceded by: Juan María Bordaberry
- Succeeded by: Aparicio Méndez

Chairman of Atlético Peñarol
- In office 1933–1934
- Preceded by: Juan Antonio Scasso
- Succeeded by: Pedro Viapina

Personal details
- Born: 7 August 1896 Rocha, Uruguay
- Died: 12 October 1980 (aged 84) Montevideo, Uruguay
- Party: Colorado Party
- Spouse: Sofía Álvarez Vignoli
- Children: 2
- Parents: Pedro Gerónimo Demicheli Mussio (Father); Balbina Lizaso Ballarena (Mother)
- Education: University of the Republic
- Occupation: Politician, Lawyer, Historian, Journalist, Pilot, Military officer

Military service
- Allegiance: Uruguay
- Branch/service: Uruguayan Armed Forces; Uruguayan Air Force
- Years of service: 1918–1960
- Rank: Captain (Army); Captain (Air Force)
- Commands: Uruguayan Army (June–September 1976)

Alberto Pedro Demicheli Lizaso (7 August 1896 – 12 October 1980) was a Uruguayan politician, lawyer, historian, journalist, pilot, and military officer who was the Interim de facto President of Uruguay and the 2nd President of the Civic-Military Dictatorship from June to September 1976. He was also the Chairman of the Football Club Atlético Peñarol from 1933 to 1934.

== Background ==
He was a noted jurist and economist and previously served as interior minister under President Gabriel Terra.

A member of the Colorado Party, Demicheli was one of a number of civilians who participated in the civilian-military administration which took office following President Juan Maria Bordaberry's coup in 1973.

== President of Uruguay ==
He succeeded Bordaberry as President in July 1976. Aged 80 by the end of his brief period as President, he was the oldest ever president of Uruguay. While in office he adopted measures designed to liberalize the economy.

Demicheli was a relative moderate within the civilian-military administrations which ruled Uruguay between 1973 and 1985, in that, although he was known for measures deemed repressive by democracy advocates opposed to the government, he dissented with his military colleagues regarding the extent to which former political figures should be proscribed from pursuing political activities: this is believed to have hastened the end of his short term of office as President of Uruguay.

Demicheli handed over his presidential office to Aparicio Méndez in September 1976, who was still serving as president when Demicheli died in 1980.

== Historical background ==
As with his predecessor Juan Maria Bordaberry, some observers would argue that the close links between leading Colorado Party figures such as Demicheli and the military mirror the similar elements present in the Colorado Party's founder, the 19th century President and military patriot, Fructuoso Rivera. The preference for rule by decree of nineteenth century Colorado President of Uruguay Venancio Flores would also be a historical case in point, according to this argument. Others would reason that Demicheli was morally repudiating Colorado Party ideals in cooperating with the civilian-military administration which took office in 1973.

The fact that the Colorado Demicheli exercised ministerial / executive powers twice in his career at periods when rule by decree was in force arguably illustrates the fact that within the party there was substantial support for such measures. The tendency of some observers to describe Latin American heads of state who ruled by decree as 'de facto' Presidents may be seen in this light. Others would seek to discount Demicheli's association with the Colorado Party.

== Spouse ==
His wife, Sofía Álvarez Vignoli de Demicheli, was noted for her diplomatic activity during the presidency of Gabriel Terra, in whose administration Alberto Demicheli also served.

== See also ==
- Politics of Uruguay
- List of political families § Uruguay

Political offices
Preceded by Juan María Bordaberry	De facto President of Uruguay; 1976	Succeeded by Aparicio Méndez
