= Consejo Nacional de Mujeres del Uruguay =

The National Women's Council of Uruguay (Consejo Nacional de Mujeres del Uruguay, CONAMU) was a women's organization in Uruguay, founded in 1916.

It was founded by the leading suffragist Paulina Luisi in 1916 along with other feminists such as Francisca Beretervide and Isabel Pinto de Vidal. It played an important role in the struggle for women's suffrage, which was finally introduced in Uruguay in 1932, but this was not the only issue promoted by the organisation.

== Bibliography ==
- Cuadro Cawen, Inés. Feminismos y Política en el Uruguay del Novecientos. Montevideo: Ediciones de la Banda Oriental, 2018. (in Spanish)
- Ehrick, Christine. The Shield of the Weak: Feminism and the State in Uruguay, 1903–1933. Albuquerque: University of New Mexico Press, 2005.
- Lavrin, Asunción. Mujeres, feminismo y cambio social en Argentina, Chile y Uruguay 1890–1940. Santiago: LOM Ediciones, 2005. (in Spanish)
