= 1927 Cerro Chato referendum =

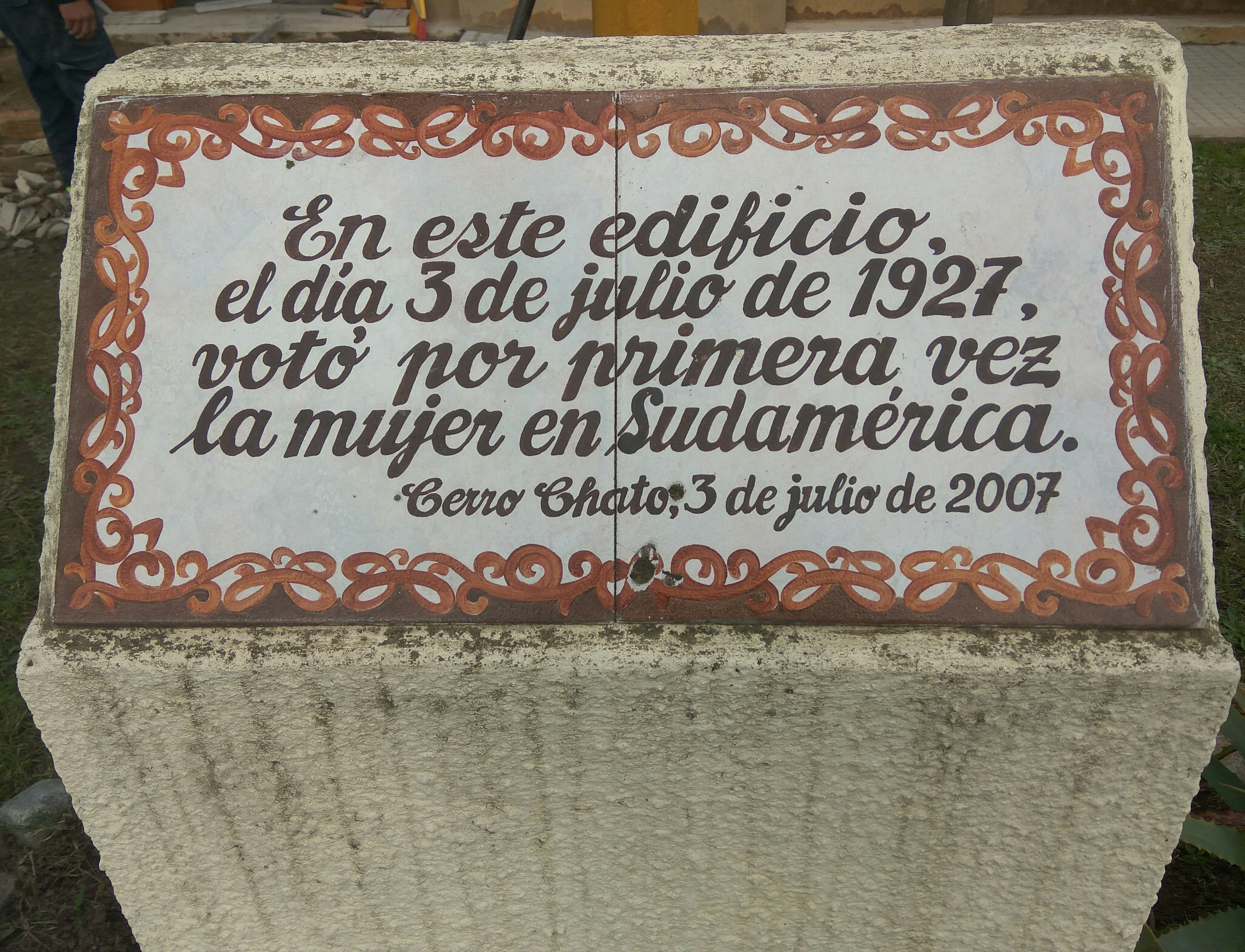
Commemorative plaque on the building where a woman voted for the first time in South America

A referendum was held in Cerro Chato, Uruguay on 3 July 1927.

The city is divided into three jurisdictions, belonging to the Departments of Durazno, Florida, and Treinta y Tres. People were asked whether they preferred the locality to be under only one jurisdiction.

The most peculiar fact is that, for the very first time in Latin America, women were legally allowed to vote.

== See also ==
- Matilde Hidalgo
- Women's suffrage in Ecuador
- Women's suffrage in Uruguay
