= Julio Giambruno Viana =

Uruguayan diplomat (born 1946)

Uruguayan Ambassador to Australia
- In office January 7, 1987 – 1991
- Preceded by: 1963 Carlos Pérez del Castillo 1980: Augusto Heber Wild Ayçaguer (17 de marzo de 2016)
- Succeeded by: 2002 Pedro Martín Mo Amaro; 23.08.2013: Alberto Fajardo; Ricardo Javier Varela Fernandez; 2008: Alberto Leopoldo Fajardo Klappenbach

Uruguayan Ambassador to South Korea
- In office September 24, 1998 – 2003
- Preceded by: Adolfo Silva Delgado
- Succeeded by: Andrea Veronica Bais Gastaldi; Luis Iribarne; Alba Rosa Florio Legnani

Uruguayan Ambassador to Poland
- In office March 31, 2010 – February 16, 2015
- Preceded by: Carlos Amorín Tenconi
- Succeeded by: Pablo Ernesto Scheiner Correa

Personal details
- Born: April 17, 1946 (age 80)
- Spouse: Laura Beatriz Pais
- Parents: Cyro Giambruno (1898 - 1948) (father); ora Viana (mother)

Julio Giambruno Viana (born April 17, 1946) is a retired Uruguayan diplomat.

== Career ==
- From 1965 to 1975 he was Technical Assistant at the Latin American Integration Association
- From January 28, 1979/May 19, 1982 to 1986 he was Deputy Consul General in New York City.
- From 7 January 1987 to 1991 he was Chargé d'affaires in Canberra.
- On Oct. 17, 1995 he got Exequatur as Consul General in San Francisco.
- From September 24, 1998 to 2003 he was ambassador in Seoul.
- In 2004 he was Director General para Asuntos Culturales del Ministerio de Relaciones Exteriores.
- From March 31, 2010 to February 16, 2015 he was ambassador in Warsaw.
