= Luisa Luisi =

Uruguayan poet, teacher and literary critic

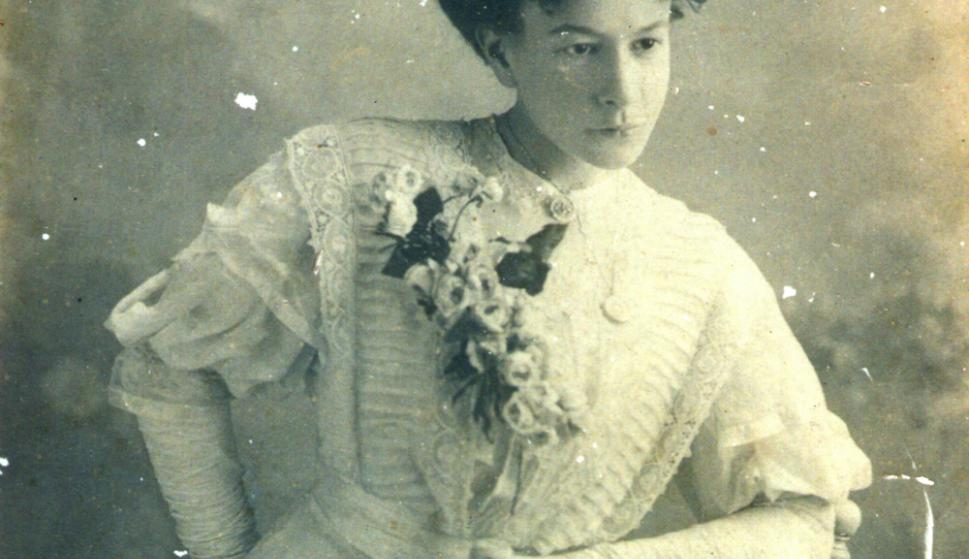
- Uruguayan poet, teacher, and literary critic
- Born: Luisa Luisi Janicki; December 14, 1883 Paysandú, Uruguay
- Died: April 10, 1940 (aged 56) Santa Lucía, Canelones; Uruguay
- Occupation: Poet, teacher, literary critic
- Literary movement: Modernism

Luisa Luisi Janicki (December 14, 1883 – April 10, 1940), was a Uruguayan poet, teacher, and literary critic.

== Biography ==
Her father was Ángel Luisi Pisano, an Italian who brought to America his masonic ideas of liberty. Her mother, María Teresa Josefina Janicki, was a teacher and daughter of exiled Poles living in France. Her parents arrived as newlyweds in Entre Ríos, Argentina, in 1872, and moved to Paysandú, Uruguay, in 1878, before finally settling down in Montevideo in 1887.

The Luisi-Janicki clan was a family of workers and educators that developed in an environment of resistance and rebellion, and tended to think more liberally for their time. Their six daughters were educated and several of them attended universities, becoming some of the first professional women in Uruguay.

Luisa was an attentive student, studying education in the Instituto Normal de Señoritas "María Stagnero de Munar," and graduated in 1903. She began her career as an assistant teacher in the Second School of the Third-Grade, and went on to direct the Second-Grade School of Practice and the School of Application. Still quite young, she became a writer for the paper La Razón of Montevideo. She was part of the Consejo Nacional de Enseñanza Primaria y Normal from 1925 until her retirement in 1929. She was also a Spanish professor in the Women's Section of Secondary Education and taught literature and oration in the María Stagnero de Munar Institute.

Luisa published four poems whilst also dabbling in prose with four other edited works that were mostly dedicated to education. She participated as an official delegate in the Congress of the Child, created in Buenos Aires in 1916, and occupied the position of secretary in the Department of Education of the Second Congress of the Child, held in Montevideo three years later. In her older age, she contracted an irreversible paralysis that confined her to a sedentary lifestyle.

Luisa also excelled as a literary critic. She was declared an honorary member of the Association of Primary School Professors of Rio de Janeiro.

== Works ==
Criticism has focused on the classics employed in her verse and the intellectual values expressed in her poetry; she is grouped with the other three Uruguayan women of the modernist movement (modernismo): María Eugenia Vaz Ferreira, Juana de Ibarbourou and Delmira Agustini.

Luisa's philosophically inclined poetry and her rigorous critical works quickly reached an international public platform in Buenos Aires and in Barcelona and is studied in Madrid and in Paris. She is discussed by Rafael Cansinos Assens (Verde y Dorado en Las Letras Americanas. Semblanzas e Impesiones Criticas [1926–1936] Aguilar, Madrid 1947), F. Contreras in L'espirit de l'Amérique Espagnole, Paris Col. de la Nouvelle Revue Critique, 1931 and by César González Ruano in Literatura Americana. Ensayos de madrigal y de crítica, Madrid: Fernando Fe, 1924. Her works were also translated into English by A. Stone Blackwell in 1929.

== Bibliography ==
=== Compositions/essays ===
- Educación artística, 1919.
- Ideas sobre educación, Montevideo, 1922
- La poesía de Enrique González Martínez, 1923.
- A través de libros y autores, 1925.
- La literatura del Uruguay en el año de su Centenario, 1930.

=== Poetry ===
- Sentir, Montevideo, 1916.
- Inquietud, Montevideo, 1922.
- Poemas de la inmovilidad y canciones al sol, Barcelona, 1926.
- Polvo de días, Montevideo, 1935.

== Bibliography ==
- Ángel Ernesto Benítez, Luisa Luisi: el ensueño dolorido, 1981.

== See also ==
- Paulina Luisi
- Clotilde Luisi
- María Eugenia Vaz Ferreira
- Juana de Ibarbourou
- Delmira Agustini
