= Candel Astra =

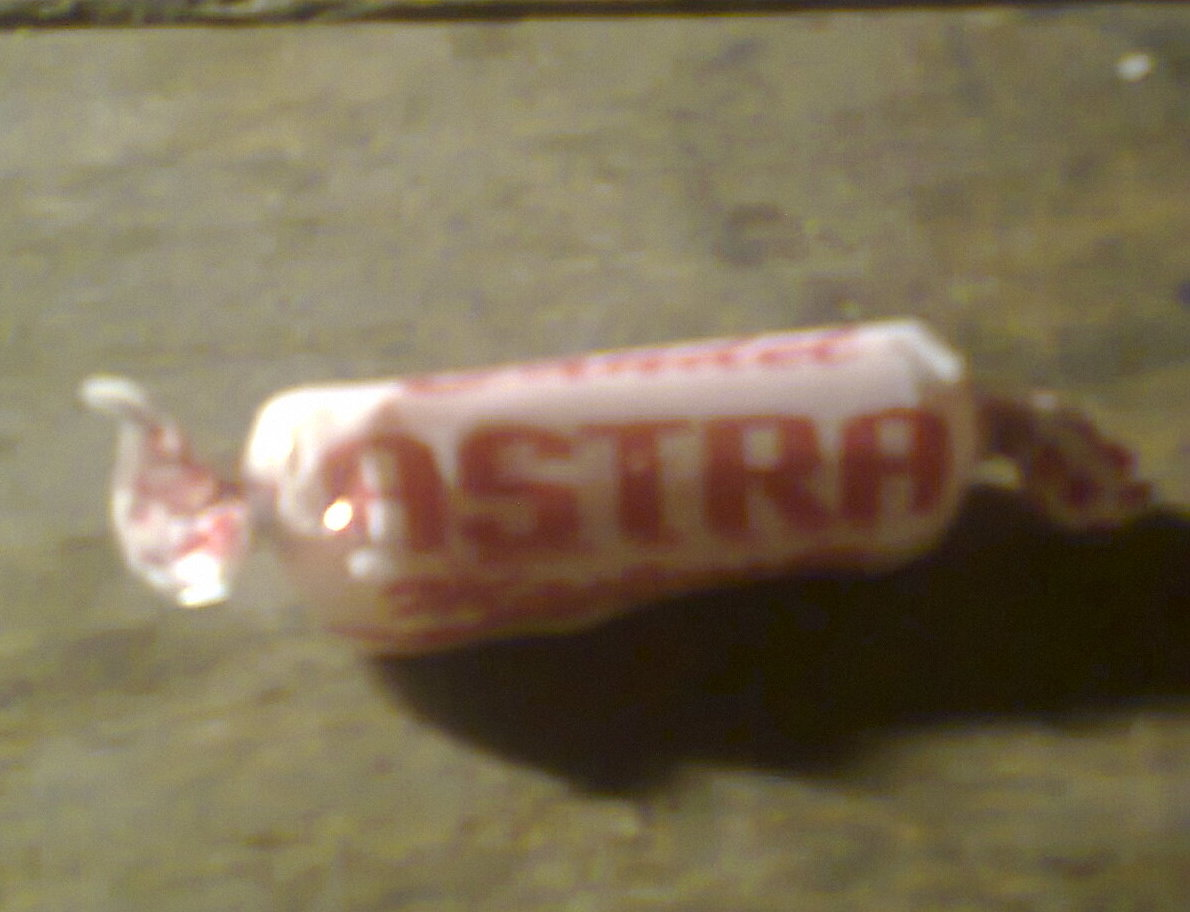
- Alternative names: Cande
- Type: Taffy
- Place of origin: Uruguay
- Region or state: Montevideo, Montevideo Department
- Created by: Pedro Steinbruch
- Invented: 1940.
- Main ingredients: Glucose, vegetable oil, strawberry and raspberry artificial flavorings, food coloring

Candel, also called cande, is a type of candy sold in Uruguay under the branded name of Astra and manufactured by La Ronda and Penino & Corona.

It is a kind of hard taffy easily identified by its pink color. The particularity of this candy is its high hygroscopy related with its consistence, that is rapidly altered by moisture shifting from hard and crunchy when dry to soft and chewy when moist.

Candels were created in 1940 by a Polish immigrant called Pedro Steinbruch and are solely sold under the Astra brand.

== History ==
Pedro Steinbruch was a Polish immigrant and candy maker that arrived to Uruguay with his wife while escaping from the war in 1930.

Once established in the country and after working at various industries he started selling his own artisanal candies based in his own old recipe. He mixed all of its ingredients in a big pan over a primus stove and created his candel.

After their invention candels were sold in schools, kiosks and local stores from Montevideo.

Ten years later another Polish immigrant takes place on the story, Jaime Grill was a young 22-year man ex-combative that married the daughter of Steinbruch.

Grill brought the family business into an industry enterprise by creating the brand Astra and mechanizing the elaboration process in 1940.

Candel Astra became a popular candy typical of Uruguay.

After the years the sales ran high and low until year 2002, when due to the Uruguayan economical crisis of that year the enterprise was forced to be sold, at that time the La Ronda fabric purchased Astra and kept the brand for itself.

== In popular culture ==
In Uruguayan Spanish, de cande, as a cande is a common expression that literally means "as fool".

== See also ==
- Taffy (candy)
- Salt water taffy
- List of candies
