= Amarilis Fuentes =

Ecuadorian teacher and suffragist

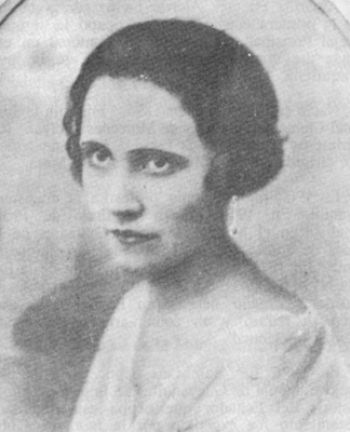
- Amarilis Fuentes circa. 1920
- Born: Amarilis Fuentes Alcívar; 1894; Guayaquil, Ecuador
- Died: 1955 (aged 60–61); Guayaquil, Ecuador
- Occupations: educator, suffragist, politician
- Years active: 1908–1954

Amarilis Fuentes (1894–1955) was an Ecuadorian teacher and suffragist, who became one of the first women in the country to hold public office. She was instrumental as a teacher and pressed for the founding of libraries in Guayaquil. There are both a school and a street which bear her name in her hometown.

== Early life ==
Amarilis Fuentes Alcívar was born in 1894, in Guayaquil, Ecuador to Mercedes Alcívar and Miguel Clemente Fuentes. She began her early education with her mother and then studied at the school run by Débora Lamota, and other schools to earn her teaching credentials.

== Career ==
Fuentes began teaching in 1908 and worked for seven years, before moving to Quito to further her education. She enrolled in the Manuela Cañizares Normal School and studied methodology and pedagogy. In 1916 she earned a certification as a normal school teacher and that same year attended the first conference devoted to pedagogy in the country.

Returning to Guayaquil, Fuentes worked at several different schools before she was appointed Deputy Director of the Rita Lecumberri School in 1919. Later that year, the school was reorganized as a normal institution and Fuentes was promoted to Director given the task of completing the restructuring of the school. She was one of the founding members of the Women's Legion of Popular Culture, established by Rosa Borja de Ycaza.

Beginning in 1924, women in Guayaquil began agitating for the right to vote and participate on local councils. When Matilde Hidalgo received a ruling from the ministerial council that she could vote, working women in Guayaquil began to take part in municipal elections. In 1925, when it was difficult for women to attain a post on a city council, Fuentes was elected to serve as a council member of the Cantonal Council, becoming the first woman to hold the position of councilor for a canton in the country. As a council member, she pressed to improvement of educational facilities and was instrumental in the development of libraries.

== Death and legacy ==
Fuentes died on 19 February 1955 in Guayaquil. The year prior to her death, a trade school bearing her name, focused on accounting and administrative education was opened in her home town. The school was managed by the Guayas Province until 1992, when control of the institution passed to the state. There is also a street in the Centenario neighborhood, in the southern part of Guayaquil which is named in her honor.
