= Clotilde Luisi =

Uruguayan lawyer (1882–1969)

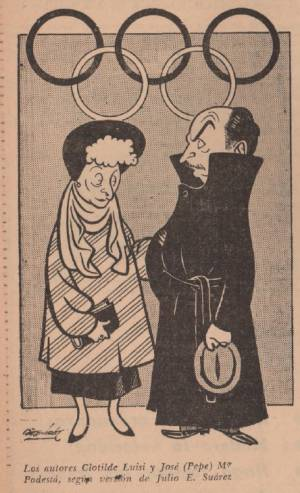
Clotilde Luisi with José María Podestá. Caricature by Peloduro.

Clotilde Luisi (24 July 1882 – 1969) was the first female lawyer in Uruguay. She was also a professor, pedagogue, translator, feminist activist, and the first Uruguayan woman to study at the Faculty of Law of the University of the Republic.

== Life and career ==
Born in Paysandú on 24 July 1882, Luisi was the daughter of Angel Luisi Pisano, an Italian emigre, and Josefina Janicki, daughter of Polish exiles in France. She had two sisters, Luisa and Paulina.

Luisi attended the Normal Institute for Girls in Montevideo and completed the qualifications for Normal Teacher of Primary Instruction. In 1900, with a scholarship awarded by the Institute for Deaf-Mute Children of Buenos Aires, she moved to this city to study methods for teaching disabled children. Two years later, having successfully passed her examinations in this subject area, she returned home and entered the University of the Republic. From 1906 to 1911, she studied Law and Social Science and took her Advocate's degree, being the first woman in Uruguay to do so. Subsequently, she was sent to Europe to represent Uruguay at the Conference of Deaf-Mute Teachers held in Rome. On her return home, she was appointed Professor of Moral Philosophy and Religion in the Normal Institute for Girls. Later, after organizing the library of the Law School of the University of the Republic, she was appointed to a professorship in that school. When the Women's University was founded in 1913 in Montevideo, Luisi became the first dean, a position which she occupied until 1919. She wrote on historical and philosophical subjects, and translated several philosophical works into Spanish. She also wrote stories in the "fantastic" vein. Her work was part of the literature event in the art competition at the 1948 Summer Olympics.

She was married to José María Podestá. Luisi died in Montevideo in 1969.

== Selected works ==
- 1953, Regreso y otros cuentos
- 1958, Treinta jovenes poetas italianos (with José María Podestá)

== See also ==
- First woman lawyers around the world
