= Bertha Valverde =

Female Ecuadorian politician

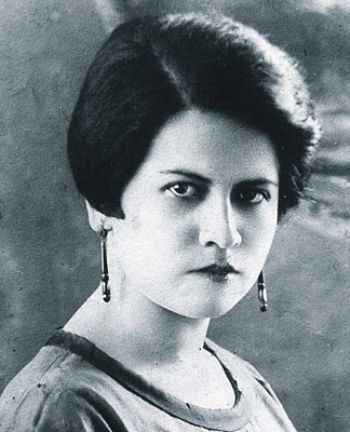
- Born: 1905
- Died: 1988 (aged 82–83)
- Other name: Berta Valverde de Duarte
- Occupations: Physician and politician
- Known for: first Ecuadorian elected woman politician
- Political party: Socialist Party
- Children: Ángel Duarte Valverde

Bertha Valverde Álvarez de Duarte (1905–1988) was an Ecuadorian politician and medic. She was first Ecuadorian woman elected to public office in 1930.

== Life ==
Valverde was born in 1905.

In a "triumph of feminism" in 1930 she was elected councilor of Guayaquil as the Socialist Party candidate. She was the first Ecuadorian woman to win an election to hold public office. The same year she briefly held the position of political head of Guayaquil.

In 1931 she graduated from the University of Guayaquil as an obstetrician. She was a medical physician for forty years.

In 1934 her son, Ángel Duarte Valverde was born. He would hold high office and stand to be President.

== Death and legacy ==
She died in 1988 and was survived by her son Ángel. A school was named for her in her home town. The centenary of her birth was marked by the National Academy of History in Guayaquil.
