= Francisca Beretervide =

Uruguayan chemist, lawyer, writer and feminist

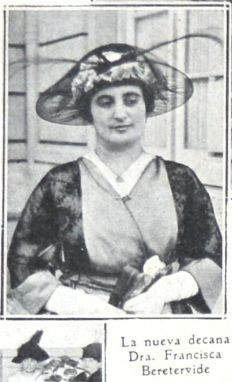
- Born: Francisca Beretervide; 6 June 1886; Flores Department, Uruguay
- Died: 31 October 1976 (aged 90); Montevideo, Uruguay
- Occupations: Lawyer, academic
- Known for: feminist activism in Uruguay

Francisca Beretervide (6 June 1886 – 31 October 1976) was an Uruguayan chemist, educator, author, lawyer, and feminist. She is noted for her role in advancing women's rights in Uruguay. Beretervide's works alongside Paulina Luisi and Isabel Pinto de Vidal paved the way for women's suffrage in her country.

== Biography ==
Beretervide was born on 6 June 1886 at Flores Department, Uruguay to José Beretervide and Francisca Torterolo. After completing her secondary education, she was admitted to the University of the Republic where she graduated with a degree in Pharmaceutical Chemistry. She then continued her education and joined the university's School of Law, where she completed her Doctor of Law degree in 1917.

Beretervide became the dean of the Women's University in Montevideo from 1917 to 1922. She replaced Clotilde Luisi, the first female dean of the university. She was also a founding member of the Consejo Nacional de Mujeres, a branch of the International Council of Women. She served as the organization's secretary general.

Beretervide died 31 October 1976 in Montevideo. In 2001, the city of Montevideo named a public space after her. The triangular space, which is called Espacio Libre Doctora Francisca Beretervide, is a designated recreation area near Atahualpa and the Cantero Doctor Alvaro Carbone.

== Works ==
As part of her feminist activities, she wrote several articles for Acción Femenina, which promoted women's rights and networking opportunities for women and feminist organizations around the world. Her published works also included papers covering chemistry and social justice.

=== Publication ===
- Legal Nature of the Vessels (1915), Journal of Law and Social Sciences
