= Aparicio Méndez =

Uruguayan lawyer and politician

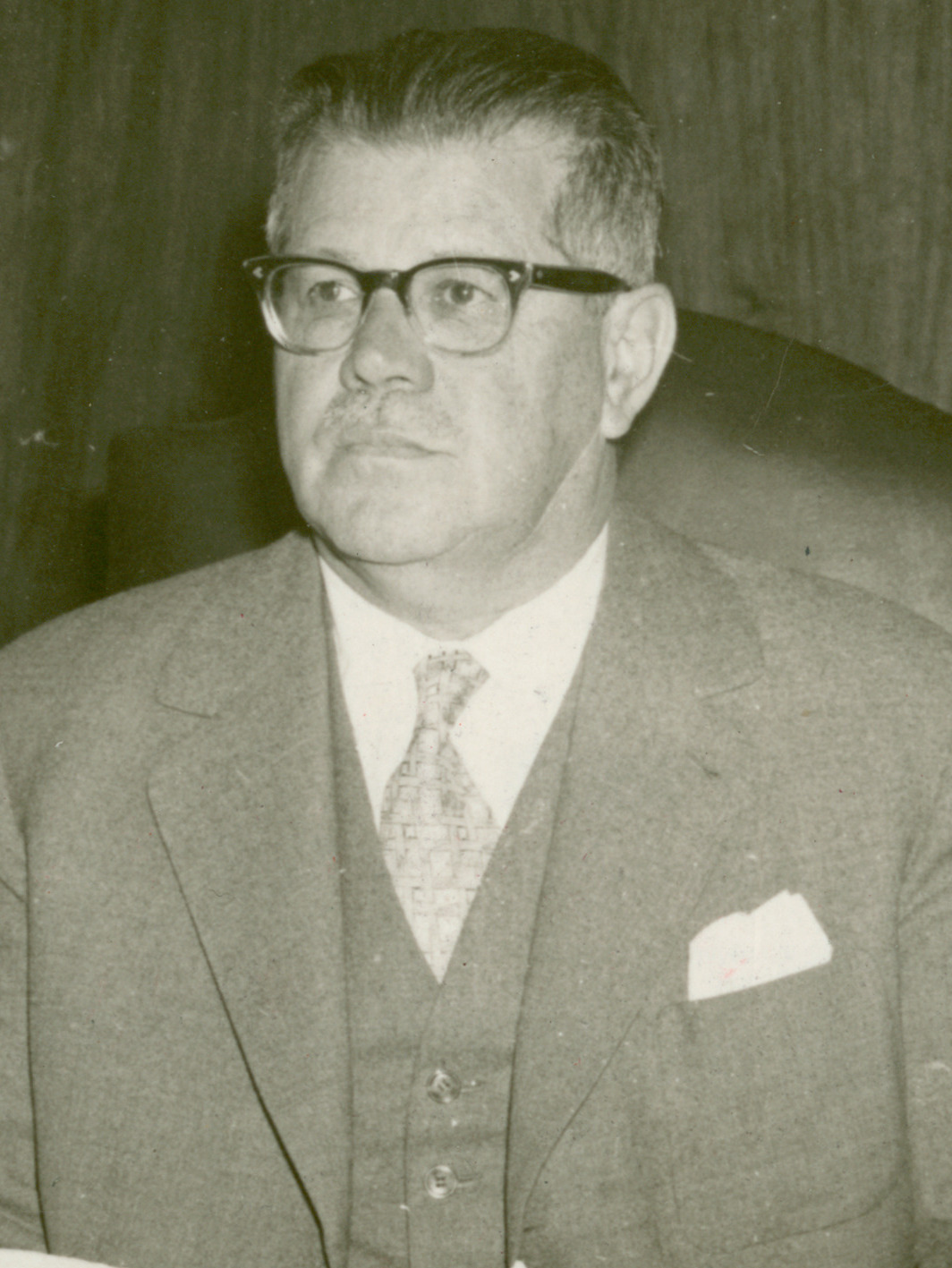

President of Uruguay Appointed by the military junta
- In office 1 September 1976 – 1 September 1981
- Preceded by: Alberto Demicheli
- Succeeded by: Gregorio Álvarez

Minister of Public Health
- In office 13 April 1961 – 16 June 1964
- President: National Council of Government
- Preceded by: Carlos Stajano
- Succeeded by: Francisco Rodríguez Camusso

Personal details
- Born: Aparicio Méndez Manfredini; 24 August 1904 Rivera, Uruguay
- Died: 27 June 1988 (aged 83) Montevideo, Uruguay
- Party: National Party
- Spouse: Blanca Alonso González
- Education: University of the Republic
- Occupation: Lawyer, politician

Aparicio Méndez Manfredini (24 August 1904 – 27 June 1988) was a Uruguayan lawyer and politician. He was a de facto President of Uruguay from 1976 to 1981 as a non-democratically elected authority of the civic-military dictatorship.

== Background ==
Born in the northern city of Rivera, Méndez was a member of the National Party, traditionally strong in the interior of the country whence he originated. He built up a reputation as an expert in administrative law.

Méndez served as Health Minister from 1961 to 1964.

In addition to his political life, Méndez was a close personal friend of the Spanish classical guitarist Andrés Segovia. Segovia lived in Montevideo during the 1940s and came into contact with Méndez during this time. Segovia composed two original pieces for Méndez, the Anecdote #4 (published in Guitar Review Magazine in 1947), and the Preludio #8 (subtitled "on a theme by Aparicio Méndez"), which was published by Edizioni Musicali Bèrben in 1998.

== President of Uruguay ==
Méndez was one of various civilian political figures who participated in the civilian-military administration which took office following President Juan Maria Bordaberry's coup in 1973 at a time of great social tension. It was as one who had built a reputation for reliability with its military participants that he subsequently served as president for five years.

=== Free constitutional referendum ===
In 1980, Méndez's government held a constitutional referendum, the free nature of which was underlined by the fact that the electorate rejected the government's proposals.

== Death and legacy ==
Méndez died in Montevideo in 1988. Some would argue that, in agreeing to serve as president with military support, Aparicio Méndez was effectively repudiating the principles of the National Party with which he had been associated. Others would point out that Méndez was far from alone among the various civilian party political figures who participated in the Civic-military dictatorship (1973–1985), and that he presided over a free referendum.

== See also ==
- Politics of Uruguay

Political offices
Preceded by Alberto Demicheli	De facto President of Uruguay; 1976–1981	Succeeded by Gregorio Conrado Alvarez
