= Rosa Borja de Ycaza =

Ecuadorian writer

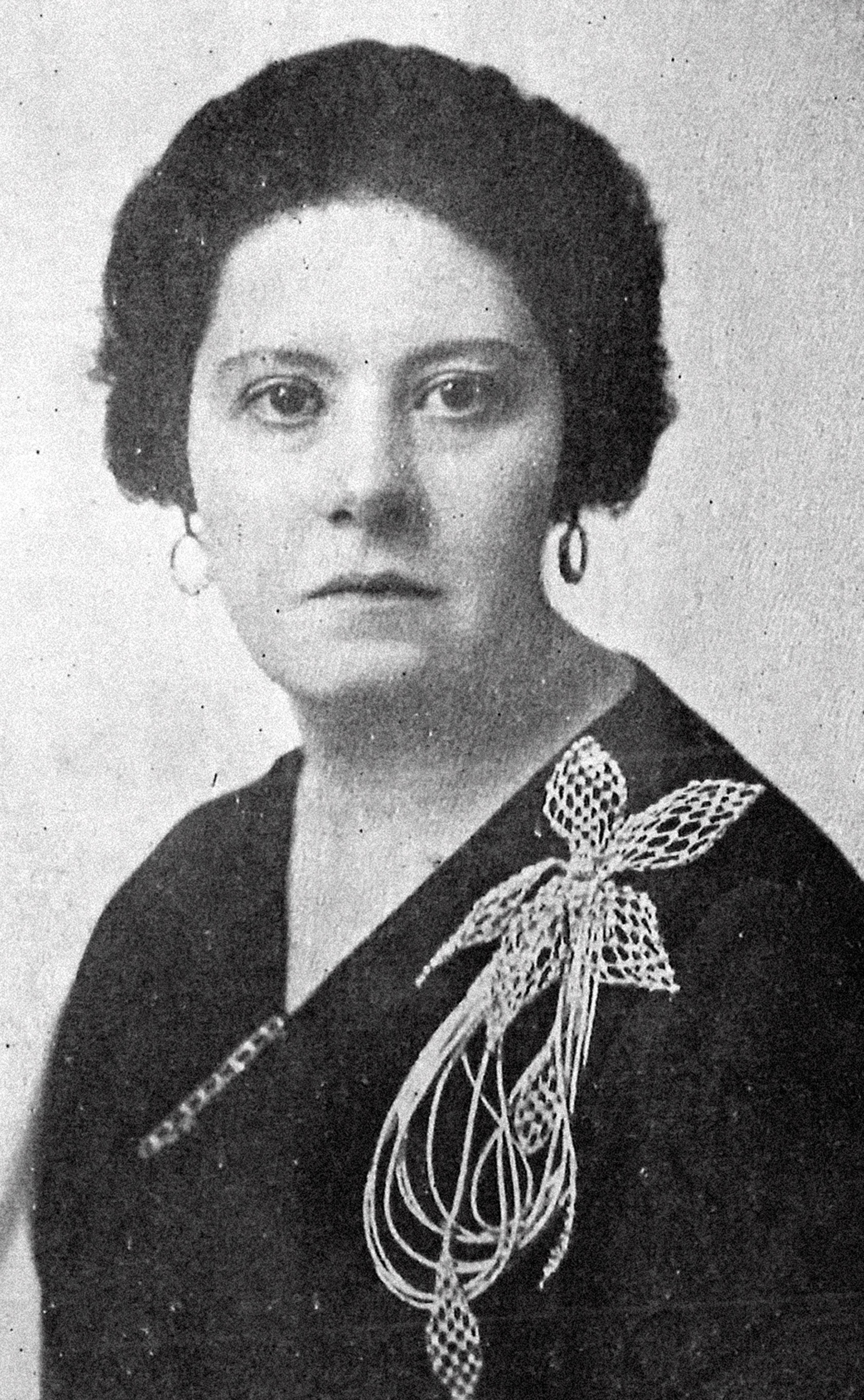
- Born: Rosa Borja Febres Cordero; 30 July 1889; Guayaquil, Ecuador
- Died: 22 December 1964 (aged 75); Guayaquil, Ecuador
- Occupation: Poet
- Spouse: Alberto Ycaza (m. 1916)
- Writing career
- Notable works: Las de Judas, Nadie sabe lo que vendrá mañana

Rosa Borja Febres-Cordero (30 July 1889 – 22 December 1964), known as Rosa Borja de Ycaza was an Ecuadorian writer, essayist, dramatist, sociologist, poet, novelist, feminist and activist. She was born and died in Guayaquil.

== Biography ==
Rosa Borja de Ycaza was born on 30 July 1889. Her father was Dr. César Borja Lavayen, a doctor, politician, French-to-Spanish translator, and Parnasian poet who wrote "Flores tardías y joyas ajenas". Her mother was Angela Febres-Cordero Lavayen.

== Career ==
She was the director of the "Center for Literary Studies" at the University of Guayaquil, founder and director of the magazine Nuevos Horizontes, member of the Ecuadorian Academy of Language and the "Ecuadorian Cultural Institute", founder of the "Journalists Circle" of Guayas and vice president of the "Bolivarian Society" of Guayaquil.

== Works ==
She wrote the plays Las de Judas and Nadie sabe lo que vendrá mañana

She left an unpublished novel María Rosario and a play El espíritu manda. She also authored sociological and historical essays. She wrote songs and composed music, and in 1942 the Chamber Music Association of Buenos Aires awarded her first prize for some of her compositions with which she had competed.

== Social work ==
She founded the "Women's Legion of Popular Culture", along with other feminists like Amarilis Fuentes

== Personal life ==
She married Alberto Ycaza in 1916 in Guayaquil.
