= Julio E. Suárez =

Uruguayan caricature artist, journalist, and comic book artist

Julio Emilio Suárez
- Born: Julio Emilio Suárez Sedraschi; September 16, 1909; Salto, Uruguay
- Died: August 15, 1965 (aged 55); Montevideo, Uruguay
- Known for: Caricature, Comic Art, Journalism
- Notable work: Peloduro (comic strip)
- Memorials: Museo de Humor y la Historieta "Peloduro"

Julio Emilio Suárez Sedraschi, also known as Peloduro (September 16, 1909, in Salto – August 15, 1965, in Montevideo) was a Uruguayan caricature artist, journalist, and comic book artist.

== Biography ==
Julio E. Suárez was one of the pioneers of comic strips in Uruguay. Born in Salto, Uruguay, he traveled to Montevideo to study architecture in 1927, but he quickly abandoned his studies. In that time he began career with newspapers and his relationship with the short-lived Uruguayan newspaper, El Nacional, where he published parliamentary notes. He published his first drawings (Wing y Roncadera) in "El Plata", before he moved to the magazine "Mundo Uruguayo" in 1934 where he published two series of drawings, “Ríase o no” (laugh or not) and “Contra-refranes” (contradictions). He worked with Mundo until 1950.

Along with his work as an illustrator, he wrote scripts starring his character "Peloduro" for the radio broadcast station CX 24 in Montevideo and became an illustration teacher in the school of applied arts. He also created the character “Marieta Caramba” voiced by actress Jebele Sand on CX 30 Radio Nacional.

Throughout his career he used various pseudonyms among them “pelo”, “Marcos Tuáin” “Pepe Repepe” and “El Mono”. However, his most widely used names were “JESS” and “peloduro”.

He died in 1965.

== Homages ==
Since 1996 el Museo de Humor y la Historieta, (Comic and Humor Museum), in the city of Minas (Comic and Humor Museum), Uruguay which was founded in 1992, carries his name, as well as a street in Montevideo. The museum also issues a "Peloduro" award.

In 1967 after his death, two compilations of his works were published “Diccionario del Disparate” and “Comentarios internacionales de “El Pulga”.

Since 2011 Uruguay celebrates Día de la Historieta on September 16 in honor of Suárez's birthday.
