= Magdalena Antonelli Moreno =

Uruguayan politician

Member of the Chamber of Representatives
- In office 1943–1947
- Constituency: Montevideo

Personal details
- Born: 9 May 1877 San Carlos, Uruguay
- Died: 1955

Magdalena Antonelli Moreno (9 May 1877 – 1955) was a Uruguayan politician. She was one of the first group of women elected to General Assembly, serving in the Chamber of Representatives from 1943 to 1947.

== Biography ==
Antonelli was born in San Carlos in 1877. She became head of the Women's Committee for Peace through Democracy of Uruguay.

In the 1942 general elections she was placed eleventh on the Colorado Party list for Montevideo, and was elected to the Chamber of Representatives as the party won 13 seats, becoming one of the first group of four women in Congress. In 1946 her proposed amendments to the Civil Code to introduce gender equality were approved by Congress. She lost her seat in the 1946 elections, but subsequently served as a substitute member on several occasions.
