= Julia Arévalo de Roche =

Uruguayan politician (1898–1985)

Julia Arévalo

Member of the Senate
- In office 1947–1951

Member of the Chamber of Representatives
- In office 1943–1947
- Constituency: Montevideo

Personal details
- Born: 1 July 1898 Barriga Negra, Uruguay
- Died: 18 August 1985 (aged 87) Montevideo, Uruguay

Julia Arévalo de Roche (1 July 1898 – 18 August 1985) was a Uruguayan politician. She was one of the first group of women elected to General Assembly, serving in the Chamber of Representatives from 1943 to 1947 and then the Senate from 1947 to 1951.

== Biography ==
Arévalo was born in Barriga Negra in Lavalleja Department in 1898. Her family moved to Montevideo when she was nine years old, and at the age of ten she began working in a match factory. She later worked in a cigarette factory. She joined the Socialist Party at the age of 15, and founded the Socialist Women's Group aged 16.

In 1920 she was a founding member of the Communist Party, becoming one of its leaders in 1934. During the Spanish Civil War she travelled to Spain to fight on the republican side. In the 1942 general elections she was the party's vice presidential candidate alongside its presidential candidate Eugenio Gómez. Although the pair only received 2.5% of the vote, Arévalo was elected to the Chamber of Representatives from the Montevideo constituency, becoming one of the first group of four women elected to the General Assembly. In 1945 she was one of the founders of the Women's International Democratic Federation. In the 1946 elections she was elected to the Senate, serving from 1947 to 1951. She subsequently served had two spells as an edila for the Montevideo municipality between 1959 and 1967.

Married with six children, she died in August 1985.

== See also ==
- Jorgelina Martínez
