= Matilde Hidalgo =

Ecuadorian physician and suffragist

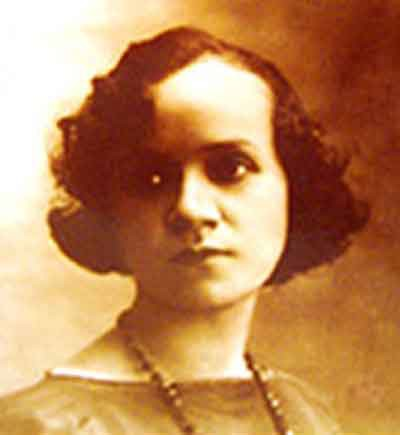
- Born: Matilde Hidalgo Navarro de Procel; September 29, 1889; Loja, Ecuador
- Died: February 20, 1974 (aged 84); Guayaquil, Ecuador
- Spouse: Fernando Procel

Matilde Hidalgo Navarro de Procel (September 29, 1889, in Loja, Ecuador – February 20, 1974, in Guayaquil, Ecuador) was an Ecuadorian physician, poet, and activist. Hidalgo was the first woman to exercise the right to vote in Latin America, and also the first to receive a Doctorate in Medicine. Hidalgo fought for the recognition of women's rights and is one of the most important women in Ecuadorian history. In 1973 she was paralyzed by a stroke, and she died in Guayaquil on February 20, 1974.

== Biography ==
Matilde Hidalgo Navarro de Procel became the first woman to graduate from a high school in Ecuador the first woman to vote in an election in Latin America and the first woman to hold elected office in her country. One of six children, she was born to Juan Manuel Hidalgo and Carmen Navarro in Loja. After her father died, her mother had to work as a seamstress to support them. Matilde studied at the school the Immaculate Conception of the Sisters of Charity.

Upon graduating from sixth grade, Matilde told her older brother Antonio that she wished to continue studying. Antonio made the request to the secular high school Colegio Bernardo Valdivieso. After thinking about it for a month, the director of the school, Angel Rubén Ojeda, agreed. However, reaction in the community was not very positive, and she had to face rejection from local people for attending high school. Not only did the local priest force her to listen to the mass two steps outside of the church's entrance, but mothers also prohibited their daughters from befriending her. Nevertheless, Matilde's mother staunchly defended her. Despite all of these obstacles, on October 8, 1913, she was the first woman to graduate high school in Ecuador.

When applying to the Central University of Ecuador, she was originally denied due to her being a woman. According to the dean of medicine faculty, she had to focus on building a home and having children. Consequently, in 1919 she traveled to Azuay, and eventually graduated with honors in medicine at the University of Cuenca. In 1921, she returned to Quito to Central University of Ecuador, and due to her bachelor's degree she was accepted for her doctorate program. She became the first woman in Ecuador to be awarded a doctorate. Two years later, Matilde married the lawyer Fernando Procel, and they had two children named Fernando and Gonzalo Procel, Fernando became a doctor and Gonzalo became an architect.

In 1974 at the age of 85 years in Guayaquil, Ecuador she died after complications with an earlier stroke, after her death a museum was established in Loja about her memories and achievements.

== Professional life and suffrage ==
During the presidency of José Luis Tamayo, Matilde announced that she was going to vote in the 1924 Ecuadorian presidential election. At the time, women were not allowed to vote. The issue was put under ministerial consultation, eventually ruling in her favor. On June 9, 1924, Matilde Hidalgo voted in Machala, Ecuador, becoming the first woman in Latin America to exercise her constitutional right to vote in a national election, and making Ecuador the first country on the continent to grant women voting rights.

Matilde became the first elected councilwoman of Machala and, the first vice-president of the Council of Machala. In 1941, she became the first woman candidate and the first elected woman public administrator in Loja, the city that was once horrified by her ambitions, with the title "Assistant Deputy".

Matilde practiced medicine in Guayaquil until 1949, when she received a scholarship to study pediatrics, Neurology, and Dietetics in Argentina.

== Awards/recognitions ==
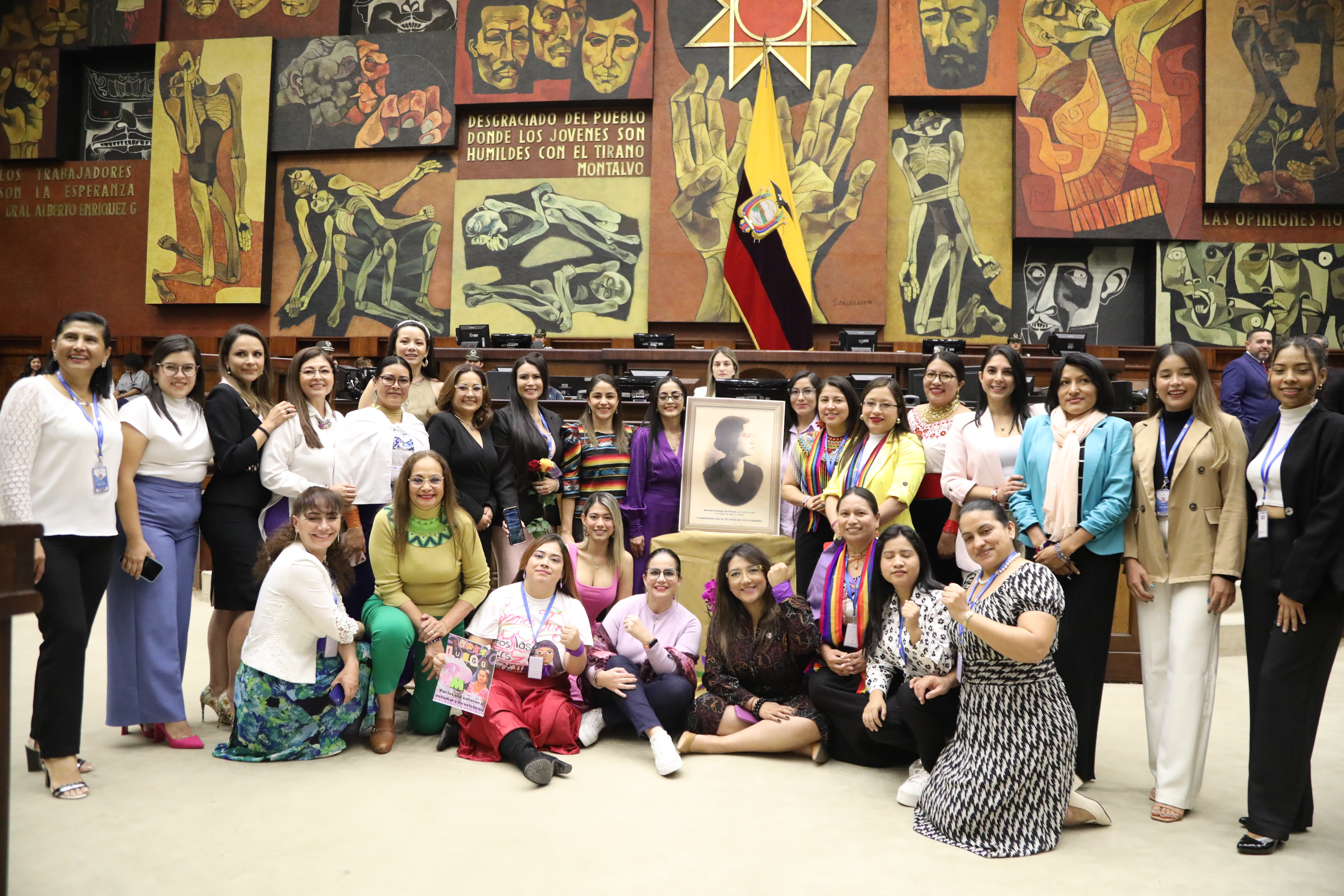
Matilde Hidalgo's portrait at centre of National assembly women in Ecuador on the eve of International Women's Day 2024

- First woman to receive a bachelor's degree in Loja and the country.
- First woman licensed in Medicine Universidad del Azuay (today Universidad de Cuenca)
- First Doctorate in Medicine Universidad de Quito
- First Academic Professional woman in the country.
- First woman to vote in Latin America.
- First female Vice President of a Municipal Council.
- First Deputy Elected to Congress.
- Teacher, politician, poet, professional, public official, wife, mother.
- National Merit Award, granted by Presidential Decree in 1956.
- Homage from the city of Loja, declaring her "Illustrious Woman" (1966).
- National Merit Award, from the Department of Public Health, granted by the Public Health Minister of Ecuador (1971).
- Vice president of Casa de la Cultura Ecuatoriana
- Honorary lifetime president of the Ecuadorian Red Cross in El Oro

== Poems ==
Literary critic Cecilia Ansaldo Briones offers a compilation of twenty poems by Matilde Hidalgo in the book by Jenny Estrada, Matilde Hidalgo of Prócel, Biography and Poetry Book. From there it is known that Matilde Hidalgo Navarro wrote her first poems when she was in secondary school and in college, writing on topics such as "the cult of Science, the admiration of Nature, praise of people or dates, Marian devotion, little poetry about love, and the topic of women".

Other known titles include:

- The woman and love.
- The goldfinch.
- Where is my happiness?
- In the apotheosis of Don Bernardo Valdivieso.
- The constant woman's plea.
- Forget me by God.
- To María.
- The Tenth of August.
- Proscription.
- My ideal.
- To Cuenca Jonah.
- Celicano patriotic hymn.
- Sacrifice.
- The poet.
- The drop of dew.
- By leaving we do not raise our store.
- Song of spring.
- In the agony of the evening.

== Memberships ==
- Medical Federation of Ecuador (founding member)
- Surgical Association of Quito (founding member)
- Press circle of Quito
- Machala Feminine Institute of Culture
- Committee of Women of the Red Cross in the Gold Province.
- House of the Ecuadorian Culture, center of the Gold Province.
- Committee of Women Lions of Machala.
- Medical Society of Ecuador.
- Society of Women Physicians of Guayas.
- National Federation of Journalists.
- College of Physicians of El Oro.
- Union of American Women, UMA.
- National Union of Ecuadorian Women, UNME.
- Pan-American Medical Association (PAMA), Ecuador Chapter.
- Benemérita Surgical Society of Guayas

== Contributions ==
She overcame the odds at a time when men occupied all spaces of power, becoming the first woman to obtain a doctorate in medicine in Ecuador and the first female academic professional in the country.

== Tribute ==
In 2004 César Carmigniani, movie and TV director, directed the movie "Matilde, la dama del siglo". Almost ten years after, Carmigniani directed a new movie of Matilde called "La dama invencible". This movie shows her life between 1907 and 1924, period of time where she lived in Machala.

On November 21, 2019, Google celebrated her with a Google Doodle in honor of what would have been her 130th birthday.
