= Cerro Chato =

- Town
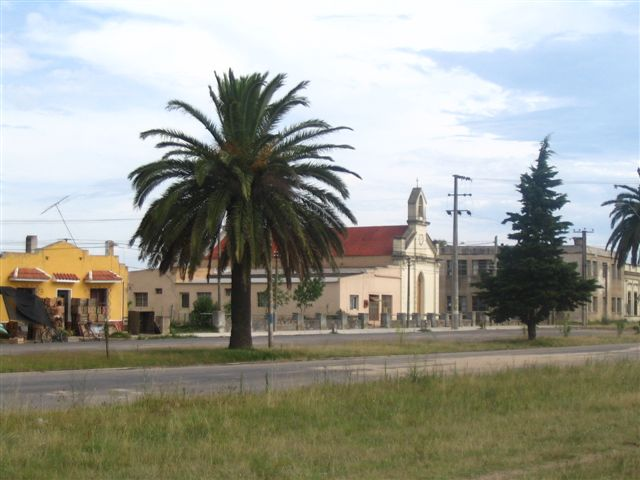
- Parish Sagrado Corazón & Club Democrático.

- Location in Uruguay
- Coordinates: 33°6′0″S 55°8′0″W
- Country: Uruguay
- Departments: Durazno Department; Florida Department; Treinta y Tres Department
- Elevation: 244 m (801 ft)

Population (2011)
  - Total: 3,227
- Time zone: UTC -3
- Postal code: 30204
- Dial plan: +598 4466 (+4 digits)
- 3 ISO codes: UY-DU, UY-FD, UY-TT

Cerro Chato (locally [ˈsero ˈtʃato], Plain Hill) is a town in central Uruguay that is divided in three parts belonging to Durazno Department, Florida Department, and Treinta y Tres Department.

== Geography ==
The town is located along Route 7, northeast by road from Valentines and southwest of Santa Clara de Olimar. It is located close to the source of the Yí River.

== History ==
The town was founded based on extensive livestock farming in the area. In the 19th century, the area of Cerro Chato was a point of passage for postilions, stagecoaches and troops of cattle destined for other regions of Uruguay. In 1908, the national railroad reached the town, which turned it into a point from where cattle could be transported nationwide.

On 8 January 1942, Cerro Chato was declared a "Pueblo" (village) by the Act of Ley Nº 10.112. Its status was elevated to "Villa" (town) by the Act of Ley Nº 13.299 on 17 November 1964.

=== Plebiscite of Cerro Chato of 1927 ===
In 1927, a non-binding plebiscite took place in Cerro Chato to decide to which department it would belong: Durazno, Florida or Treinta y Tres. For this referendum, every citizen of the town was called to vote, including women. That was the first time in Latin America that women exercised the right to vote. The Department of Durazno won the plebiscite, but this result was not accepted by the authorities. Therefore, Cerro Chato still is split between the three departments.

== Population ==
According to the 2011 census, Cerro Chato had a total population of 3,227; 1,694 lived in Trenta y Tres, 1,124 lived in Durazno and 409 lived in Florida.

Year	Population
1963	2,513
1975	2,582
1985	2,459
1996	2,945
2004	3,278
2011	3,227

Source: Instituto Nacional de Estadística de Uruguay

== Economy ==
The main economic activity of the town is cattle and sheep production due to the quality fields in the area.

The town was to give host to the controversial Aratirí iron mining project which would have produced 18 million tons of iron per year. However, the project was cancelled in 2016 after widespread ridicule over its impact to local farms.

== Places of worship ==
- Sacred Heart of Jesus Parish Church (Roman Catholic)

== Notable people ==
- Julio Alpuy (1919-2009), sculptor, painter and engraver, active in New York
- Diego Ifrán (born 1987), footballer
