= Paulina Luisi =

Argentine-born Uruguayan doctor and feminist (1875-1950)

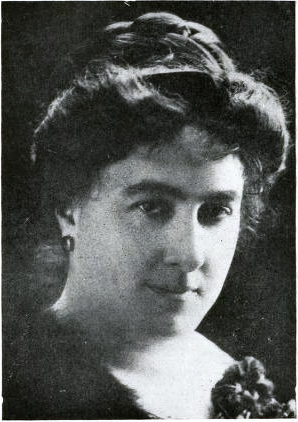
- Luisi in 1921
- Born: Paulina Luisi Janicki; 22 September 1875; Colón Department, Argentina
- Died: 16 July 1950 (aged 74); Montevideo, Uruguay
- Occupations: Physician; educator; political activist

Paulina Luisi Janicki (Spanish: [/paʊˈliːnə ˈluːizi ˈjænɪski/]; 22 September 1875 – 16 July 1950) was a Uruguayan physician, suffragist and political activist who played a prominent role in advancing the feminist movement in Uruguay and participated in international efforts for women's rights.

Born in Colón, Argentina, to a Polish mother and an Italian father, Luisi moved to Uruguay at an early age. She studied teaching and medicine, becoming the first woman in Uruguay to earn a medical degree. She later represented Uruguay in international women's conferences and traveled throughout Latin America and Europe. She is considered one of the principal figures in the Pan-American feminist movement, having helped to found the Pan-American Women’s Auxiliary. However, she frequently clashed with other major figures in the movement, including members of the International Woman Suffrage Alliance (IWSA) such as Carrie Chapman Catt and Bertha Lutz.

Several prominent Uruguayan advocacy organizations were founded with Luisi's support, including the Unión Nacional de Telefonistas (transl. Telephone Operators Union) and the Alianza de Mujeres para los Derechos Femeninos (transl. Women's Alliance for Women's Rights), which championed women's suffrage in Uruguay. She also supported eugenic reforms, as well as regulations governing the sex industry. She worked with the League of Nations to combat sex trafficking and advance the rights of children.

During the 1930s, Luisi was a regular announcer on the Uruguayan radio station Radio Femenina, an "all-woman" radio station where she adopted the nickname Abuela (transl. Grandmother). She also worked with various organizations to oppose the rise of fascism in Uruguay and abroad and advocated for sexual education in schools. She died on 16 July 1950.

== Early life and education ==
Paulina Luisi was born in Colón, Argentina, on 22 September 1875. Her mother, Maria Teresa Josefina Janicki, was a women's suffrage activist of Polish descent, and her father, Angel Luisi, was an Italian socialist and educator. Shortly after her birth, the family moved to Uruguay, where they worked as teachers and founded multiple educational establishments, including the Luisi Institute, the Centro Liberal (transl. Liberal Center), and the Ateneo de Paysandú (transl. Paysandú Athenaeum). Luisi had seven siblings, including two notable sisters: Clotilde Luisi, who was the first female lawyer in Uruguay, and Luisa Luisi, who was a famous poet.

Luisi earned a teaching degree in 1890 and, in 1899, became the first woman in Uruguay to earn a bachelor's degree. In 1908, she became the first woman to graduate from the Medical School of the University of the Republic of Uruguay, and soon after she became the head of the gynecology clinic of the university's Faculty of Medicine. At the time Luisi was starting her medical career, there were only four female doctors in Uruguay, compared to 305 male doctors. Luisi benefited from her specialization in the treatment of women, as many women preferred being treated by other women due to prevailing social prejudices held by male doctors.

Luisi was introduced to the Latin American feminist movement during her time at university, with Argentine feminist Petrona Eyle writing to her to recruit her to join her organization, Universitarias Argentinas (transl. Argentine Association of University Women). In a letter dated May 1, 1907, Eyle encouraged Luisi and her female colleagues in the university to form an Uruguayan branch of the Universitarias, stating that “although there aren’t many of you now, you will always be the nucleus around which others will come together”. The Uruguayan branch of the Universitarias was founded in 1907.

== Activism and career ==
=== Early activism ===
[Feminism demonstrates that] woman is something more than material created to serve and obey man like a slave, that she is more than a machine to produce children and care for the home; that women have feelings and intellect; that it is their mission to perpetuate the species and this must be done with more than the entrails and the breasts; it must be done with a mind and a heart prepared to be a mother and an educator; that she must be the man’s partner and counselor not his slave.

— Paulina Luisi, Acción Femenina, 1917

During the 1910s, Luisi took part in numerous conferences and other activities with the aim of advancing the feminist movement both in Uruguay and abroad. In 1910, she participated in the Universitarias-organized Congreso Femenino (transl. Women's Congress) held in Buenos Aires. The conference was attended by over 200 women from Argentina, Uruguay, Peru, Paraguay, and Chile. While there, she became acquainted with prominent Argentine feminists such as Alicia Moreau de Justo and Cecilia Grierson, as well as other future leaders of the feminist movement in Latin America. Later, she traveled to Europe, where she became acquainted with members of the French feminist movement such as Avril de Sainte-Croix, president of the Moral Unity Committee of the International Council of Women, and Julie Siegfried, president of the National Council of French Women.

In 1915, Luisi helped to found the Pan-American Women’s Auxiliary, which met at the same time as the Second Pan-American Scientific Congress in Washington, D.C. The Auxiliary, headed by the wives of high-ranking U.S. officials, advocated for the "social and economic betterment" of women and children. Then, in 1916, Luisi founded the Consejo Nacional de Mujeres del Uruguay (CONAMU, transl. National Women's Council of Uruguay) along with Isabel Pinto de Vidal and Francisca Beretervide. She served as the primary editor of the CONAMU bulletin Acción Femenina (transl. Feminine Action), which primarily focused on topics concerning women's values and equality. She also gave the keynote address before the First Pan-American Child Congress in 1916, emphasizing the importance of democracy and women's rights, including the right to vote, in the Americas. While there, she introduced several resolutions advocating for sex education and public health.

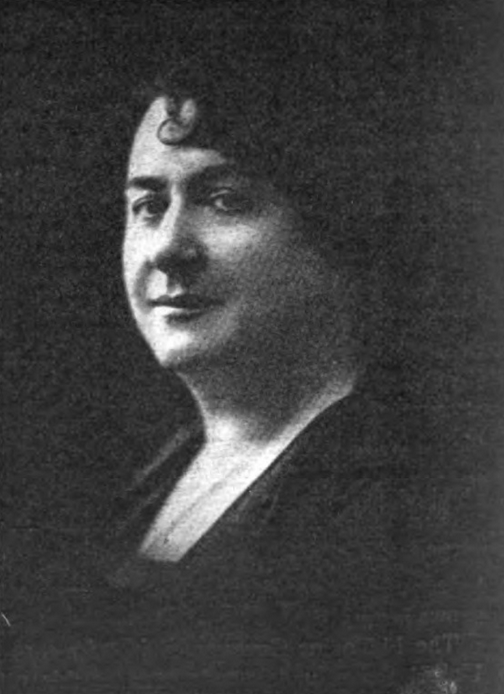
Paulina Luisi (1919)

Luisi also began advocating for working-class women around this time. In 1918, she assisted in the creation of the Unión Nacional de Telefonistas (transl. Telephone Operators Union), the first women's union in Uruguay, and intervened on their behalf to reduce workloads by decreasing the number of phone lines at the telephone company Montelco from 100 to 80. The intervention failed, with the number of phone lines going up between 1918 and 1922.

=== Conflict with IWSA and CONAMU ===
Divisions began to emerge in CONAMU around 1918, with Luisi alienating members of the Batllista faction of the Colorado Party, including fellow CONAMU founder Pinto de Vidal, by aligning herself with socialist political positions. Because of these divisions, Luisi helped to found the Alianza de Mujeres para los Derechos Femeninos, which split off from CONAMU in 1919. Initially, the Alianza's primary focus was women's suffrage and access to government positions, and it frequently pressured elected officials to grant women various political rights. In one notable instance, it worked with Deputy Alfeo Brum to get the General Assembly to pass a bill authorizing women’s suffrage at the municipal level so that women could fulfill their "legitimate social duty of rendering service to the different domains of public welfare". The bill did not pass, and with suffrage stalled, the Alianza expanded its agenda to include women’s economic and civil rights. Luisi resigned from CONAMU in 1921, citing the group's "unethical and conspiratorial behavior". Pinto de Vidal became the new head of the organization in her stead, but Luisi returned to the organization soon after her resignation to work in other capacities.

Luisi also came into conflict with the IWSA, the parent organization of the Alianza, during the 1920s. She specifically opposed the leadership of Carrie Chapman Catt and Bertha Lutz, whose attitudes toward Latin American feminists she viewed as being condescending and imperialistic. As she became more distant from the IWSA, Luisi began associating more closely with the Liga Internacional de Mujeres Ibéricas e Hispanoamericanas (transl. International League of Iberian and Latin American Women) and its founder Elena Arizmendi Mejía. The conflict reached a crisis point in 1923 at the IWSA conference in Rome, with Luisi opposing a motion supported by Lutz to reintegrate the IWSA with the International Council of Women (ICW), which she viewed as being more conservative. She also opposed the merger on the grounds that it would privilege European recognition over inter-American solidarity. While the merger ultimately did not pass, the personal rivalry between Luisi and Lutz for influence in the organization continued to escalate.

Luisi clashed once again with CONAMU leadership in 1923, expressing anger over CONAMU's alleged rewriting of her work, publicly criticizing them for their conservative views in the newspaper El Día. Soon after, Luisi was discharged from her role as CONAMU's external secretary. Later, in 1925, Pinto de Vidal resigned from her position as the organization's president. and Acción Femenina ceased publication.

=== Work on sex trafficking ===
Luisi was strongly opposed to sex work, viewing it as a degrading "social evil" according to historian Magaly Rodriguez Garcia. However, she also saw it as a product of economic hardship and saw the correlation between prostitution and low wages. The sex trade in general was seen as a growing problem in Latin America and around the world, with many women being forced to participate against their will. In 1919, Luisi delivered a well-known lecture at the University of Buenos Aires titled "The White Slave Trade and the Problem of Reglamentation". (Note: According to Little, reglamentation refers to "legalized and government-controlled prostitution".) Not long after the conference, the Argentine-Uruguayan Abolitionist Committee was formed. She also collaborated with the Municipal Council of Buenos Aires in 1919 to outlaw brothels and provide work opportunities, legal protection, and hostels for sex workers seeking to leave the trade.

Luisi worked extensively with the League of Nations' Committee on the Traffic of Women and Children, serving as the Uruguayan delegate and helping to ratify the League of Nations Convention for the Suppression of the Traffic in Women and Children in Uruguay in 1921. She also attended the League of Nations' International Labour Conference in 1922 as a representative from Uruguay. While there, she proposed the demographic separation of men and women and of different age groups in data about human trafficking so that it would better reflect the vulnerability of women and children to being trafficked, noting in her proposal that "a large number of girl emigrants are sent to South America from countries like Poland, Russia, Spain and Italy for immoral purposes, under the pretext of being hired for ordinary domestic work". The proposal was ultimately withdrawn, but the International Labour Organization did promise that it would coordinate with the advisory committee on more precise age and sex classifications.

Luisi also helped to pass the Children's Code in 1934 in collaboration with the Uruguayan National Council of Women. The code placed the responsibility for protecting children on the state while also granting care and social security for pregnant women. It also addressed problems stemming from illegitimate births.

=== Later activism ===
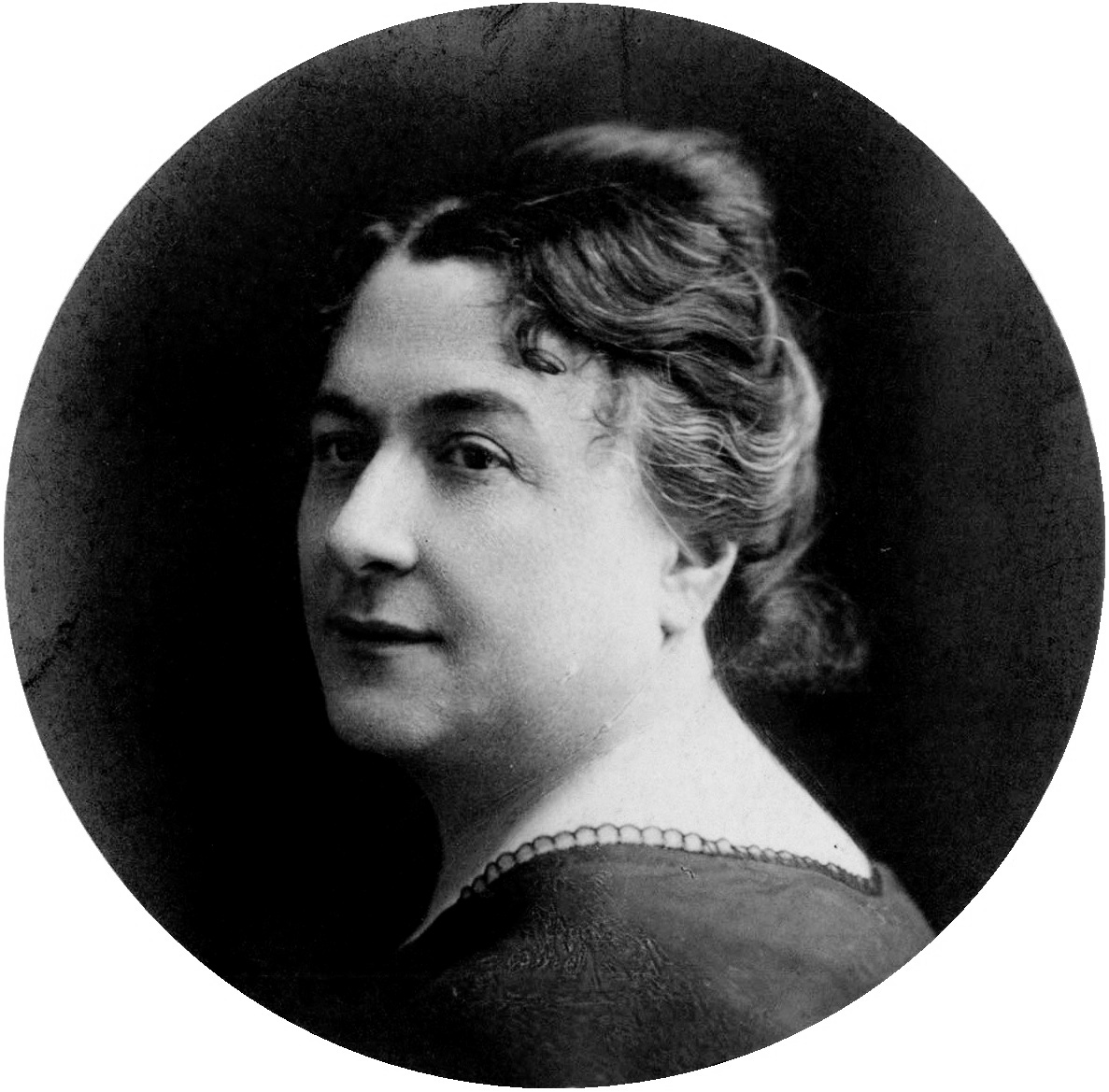

In her later years, Luisi's feminist activism began to take the form of radio broadcasting. During the 1930s, she was a regular announcer on Radio Femenina, an "all-woman" radio station in Uruguay. On air, Luisi urged feminists to remain active, arguing that women could make a difference acting as "mediators and peacemakers". Luisi adopted the nickname "Abuela" while hosting, giving her a sense of authenticity and authority that resonated with women in Uruguay. A milestone in Luisi's radio career occurred in 1942, when she encouraged women to vote in the 1942 elections to prove that women were worthy of citizenship.

Luisi also became an advocate for disarmament and developed an intolerance for fascism during the 1930s and 1940s. She opposed the Japanese invasion of Manchuria in 1931 and Adolf Hitler's rise to power in 1933. She also opposed the Uruguayan "Revolution of March" led by Gabriel Terra in 1933, briefly fleeing to Europe but returning to Uruguay shortly after. In 1934, she established the Unión Femenina Contra la Guerra (UFG, transl. Union of Women Against War), an Uruguayan branch of the Comité Mondial des Femmes Contre la Guerre et le Fascisme (CMF). She also collaborated with various communist-aligned groups, viewing the rise of fascism as a means for capitalists to maintain control over the working class. In 1935, Luisi gave a speech before the Uruguayan parliament opposing the Second Italo-Ethiopian War. Then, in 1936, she helped to enlist women's aid for the Republicans during the Spanish Civil War. She also helped support Terra's ouster in 1938, though she expressed concern that Uruguay still "suffer[ed] from a de facto government which leans toward fascism".

Luisi's belief in sex education, first enumerated in 1916, became a more prominent part of her later advocacy as well. She spoke extensively about its importance from the 1930s to the 1950s, positing that sex education would help foment responsibility and ethical behavior. Her suggestions earned her the label of "anarchist" and "revolutionary" from some. Nevertheless, in 1944, many of her suggestions for sexual education were incorporated into the Uruguayan public school system. In her 1950 book Pedagogia y Conducta Sexual (transl. Pedagogy and Sexual Behavior), she "defined sex education as the pedagogic tool to teach the individual subject to sexual drives to the will of an instructed, conscientious, responsible intellect".

== Death and legacy ==
In 1947, the Primer Congreso Interamericano de Mujeres (transl. First Inter-American Women’s Conference) in Guatemala paid tribute to Luisi, recognizing her as the "mother" of inter-American feminism. Luisi died in Montevideo three years later on 16 July 1950. Many of her papers remain in various archives across Montevideo. She is remembered by historian Estela Ibarburu as "a person who marked a milestone in the process of women's empowerment".

== Views ==
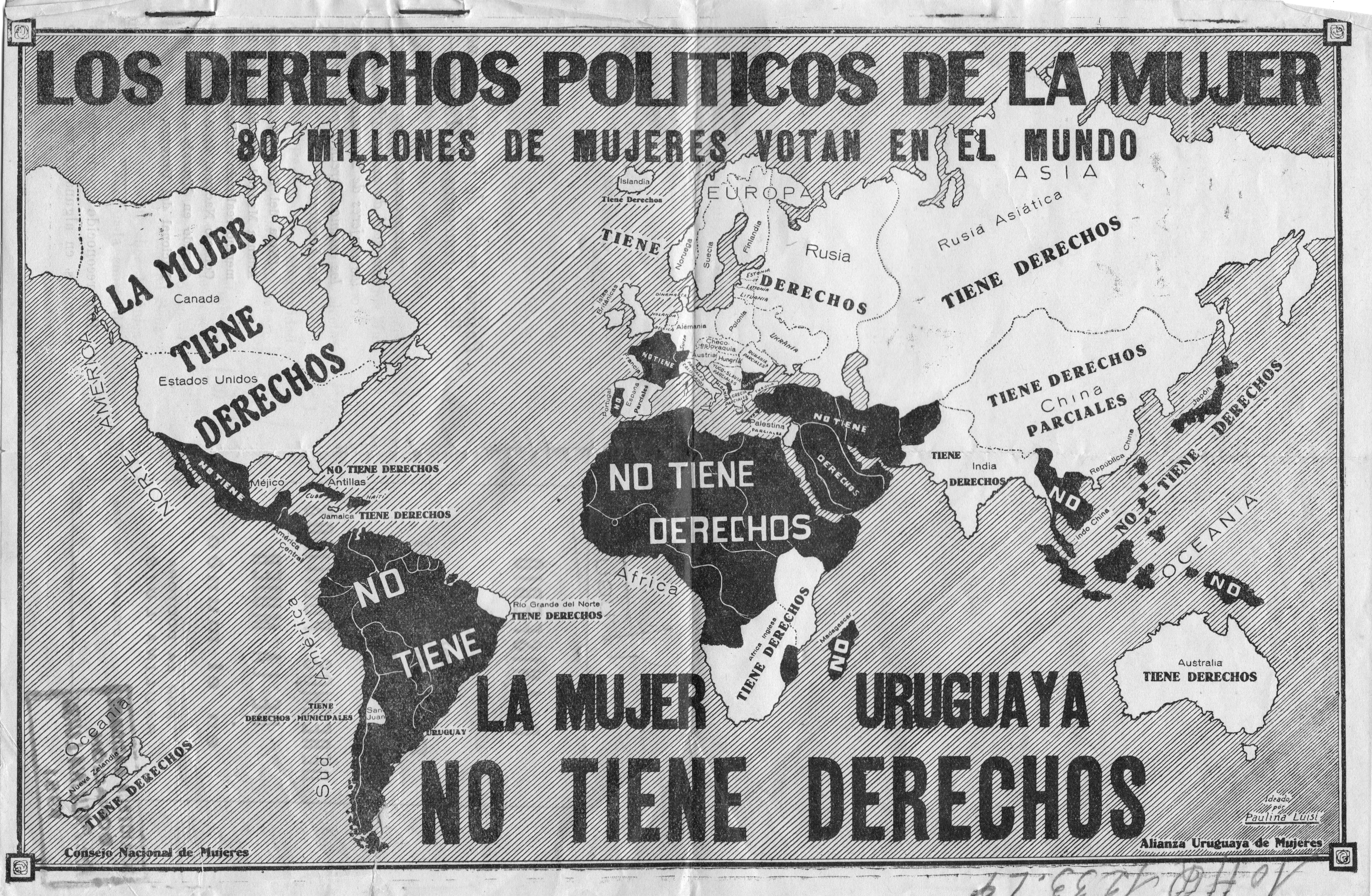
Map included in the booklet Planisphere indicating the current position of women's political rights in the world of 1929, in which Luisi details the situation of women's voting rights in different countries of the world

Luisi is strongly associated with the feminist movement in Latin America. Her feminist views were influenced by figures within the Western liberal tradition, including Olympe de Gouges, the writer of the Declaration of the Rights of Woman, and Josephine Butler, the 19th-century English moral reformer. Butler's fight against the Contagious Diseases Prevention Act 1864 (27 & 28 Vict. c. 85) and her foundation of the International Abolitionist Federation (IAF) in Geneva to curb the white slave trade was particularly inspiring to Luisi.

In addition to fighting for women’s rights in Uruguay, Luisi aspired to create a Pan-American feminist movement that would benefit all countries in the Americas. Luisi traveled to the United States hoping to develop Pan-American feminism alongside American feminists, but she emerged disappointed in American women’s unwillingness to work alongside Latin American women as equal partners. However, with the outbreak of World War II, she returned to her earlier Pan-American stance, once again advocating for "sisterhood" between the two groups.

Luisi was a supporter of eugenics, publishing an article in the Buenos Aires Revista de Filosofi (transl. Journal of Philosophy) titled "Sobre Eugenia" (transl. About Eugenics) in 1916. In the article, she called for the "protection of racial reproduction against mental and physical degeneration", including by "imposition of controls on the reproduction of the hereditarily unfit", as well as a variety of social reforms aimed at reducing alcoholism, drug abuse, and other health-related issues that were perceived as being hereditary.

Luisi has also been associated with the moral reform movement. She espoused an ideal of "moral unity", which was characterized by its opposition to sex work and the spread of venereal diseases, as well as its general concern with elevating the role of women in society. She was also a self-identified socialist, calling for individual social responsibility and a "collective social consciousness". She praised the Partido Socialista del Uruguay (transl. Socialist Party of Uruguay) for being the "only party that proclaims the equality of the sexes", and she ran for the Chamber of Representatives on the Socialist ticket in 1942, though she ultimately withdrew her candidacy because of opposition from the Socialist leadership to her feminist politics.

== Sources and further reading ==
- Ehrick, Christine (2005). The Shield of the Weak: Feminism and the State in Uruguay, 1903-1933. Albuquerque: University of New Mexico Press. ISBN 978-0-8263-3470-1. OCLC 780539383.
- Ehrick, Christine (2015). Radio and the Gendered Soundscape: Women and Broadcasting in Argentina and Uruguay, 1930–1950. New York: Cambridge University Press. doi:10.1017/cbo9781139941945. ISBN 978-1-139-94194-5. OCLC 917009082.
- Lavrin, Asunción (1995). Women, Feminism, and Social Change in Argentina, Chile, and Uruguay, 1890-1940. Lincoln (Neb.): University of Nebraska Press. ISBN 0-8032-2897-X. Archived from the original on 2024-09-26.
- Marino, Katherine (2013). La Vanguardia Feminista: Pan-American Feminism and the Rise of International Women's Rights, 1915-1946 (PDF) (PhD thesis). Stanford: Stanford University. Archived (PDF) from the original on 7 December 2022.
- Marino, Katherine (2019). Feminism for the Americas: The Making of an International Human Rights Movement. Chapel Hill: The University of North Carolina Press. ISBN 978-1-4696-4969-6. OCLC 1084655495.
