= Juan María Bordaberry =

President of Uruguay from 1972 to 1976

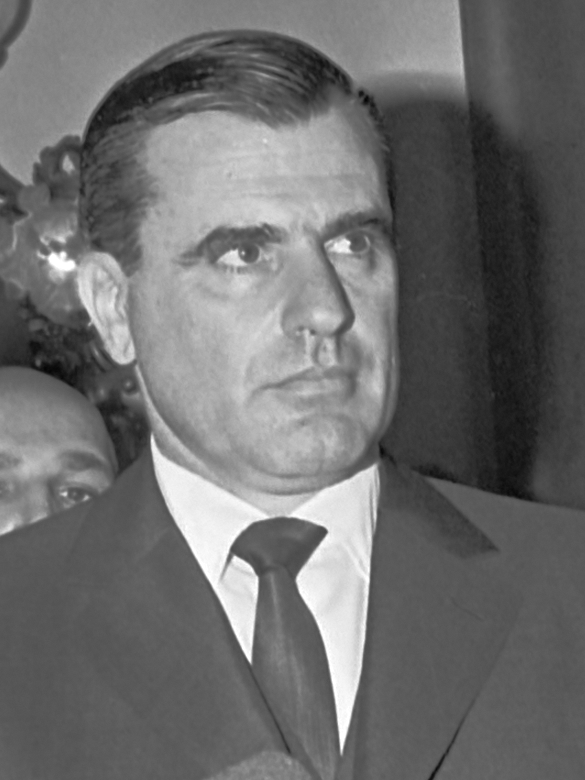
- Bordaberry in 1971

34th President of Uruguay
- In office 1 March 1972 – 12 June 1976
- Vice President: Jorge Sapelli (1972–1973); Vacant (1973–1976)
- Preceded by: Jorge Pacheco Areco
- Succeeded by: Alberto Demicheli (interim)

1st President of the Civic-Military Dictatorship
- In office 27 June 1973 – 12 June 1976
- Preceded by: Office established
- Succeeded by: Alberto Demicheli (interim)

Minister of Agriculture
- In office 14 October 1969 – 1 February 1972
- President: Jorge Pacheco Areco
- Preceded by: Jaime Montaner
- Succeeded by: Héctor Viana Martorell

Personal details
- Born: 17 June 1928 Montevideo, Uruguay
- Died: 17 July 2011 (aged 83) Montevideo, Uruguay
- Resting place: Cemetery Parque Martinelli de Carrasco, Canelones Department
- Party: Colorado Party
- Spouse: Josefina Herrán Puig
- Children: 9, including Pedro
- Parents: Domingo Bordaberry (Father); Elisa Arocena (Mother)
- Relatives: Bordaberry family
- Education: University of Montevideo
- Occupation: Politician, Stockgrower

Criminal details
- Conviction(s): Crimes against humanity
- Criminal penalty: 30 years
- Imprisoned at: House arrest

Juan María Bordaberry Arocena (Spanish: [boɾðaβeˈri aɾoˈsena]; 17 June 1928 – 17 July 2011) was an Uruguayan politician and cattle rancher who served as the 34th president of Uruguay from 1972 until his ouster in 1976. For the last three years of his tenure, he was the first president of the Civic-Military Dictatorship. Previously, he was the minister of agriculture from 1969 to 1972. He came to office following the presidential elections of 1971. In 1973, Bordaberry engineered a self-coup where he dissolved the General Assembly and transferred its powers to a military-influenced Council of State. He then ruled by decree as a military-sponsored dictator until disagreements with the military led to his being overthrown before his original term of office had expired.

On 17 November 2006, Bordaberry was arrested in a case involving four deaths, including two of members of the General Assembly during the period of civilian-military rule in the 1970s.

== Early life and background ==
Juan María Bordaberry Arocena was born on 17 June 1928 in the capital city of Montevideo, Uruguay, into the prominent political Bordaberry family. Bordaberry was of French descent. His grandfather, Jacques Bordaberry Oyhamburu, was a Basque native of Pagolle in the Pyrénées-Atlantiques department, who moved to Durazno in 1865. His father, Domingo Bordaberry, served in the Senate and in Ruralist leadership, and was heir to one of the largest ranches in the country. His mother, Elisa Arocena Folle, was the daughter to Alejo Gregorio Arocena Artagaveytia, a nephew to business magnate Ramón F. Artagaveytia Gómez who was one of three Uruguayans who lost their lives during the sinking of the Titanic, and a cousin and second uncle to Emilia Nicanora Artagaveytia Arocena, the paternal grandmother to National Party senator, Francisco Gallinal. Her aunts were Matilde and Amalia de Arocena Artagaveytía, the latter of which was the mother of foreign minister Eduardo Rodríguez Larreta and paternal grandmother of politician Alberto Zumarán. Juan María was the second of four children, the oldest of which, Luis Ignacio, was married to Gloria Fontana Etchepare, aunt to politician Luis Alberto Heber.

Initially, Bordaberry was aligned to the National Party and was elected to the Senate on the Blanco ticket. In 1964, however, he assumed the leadership of Liga Nacional de Accion Ruralista (National Rural Action League), and in 1969 joined the Colorado Party. That year he was appointed to the Cabinet, where he sat from 1969 to 1971 as minister of agriculture in the government of President Jorge Pacheco, having had a long association with rural affairs.

== President of Uruguay ==
Bordaberry was elected president as a Colorado candidate in 1971. He actually won the second-most overall votes, finishing 60,000 votes behind Wilson Ferreira Aldunate of the National Party. However, the combined Colorado vote exceeded the combined National vote by just over 12,000 votes. Under Uruguay's Ley de Lemas system, the highest-finishing candidate of the party that won the most votes was elected president.

Bordaberry took office in 1972 in the midst of an institutional crisis caused by the authoritarian rule of Pacheco and the terrorist threat. Bordaberry, at the time, had been a minor political figure; he had little independent standing as a successor to Pacheco other than being Pacheco's handpicked successor. He continued Pacheco's authoritarian methods, suspending civil liberties, banning labor unions, and imprisoning and killing opposition figures. He appointed military officers to most leading government positions.

Before and after his period of Presidential office, he was identified with schemes for agricultural improvement; his Agriculture minister was Benito Medero. In personal terms, one of Bordaberry's actions which proved in hindsight to have been disadvantageous was his appointment of Jorge Sapelli as Vice President of Uruguay, given the latter's resignation and public repudiation of him in 1973. On June 27, 1973, Bordaberry dissolved Congress, suspended the Constitution and gave the military and police the power to take whatever measures it deemed necessary to restore order. For the next three years, he ruled by decree with the assistance of a National Security Council ("COSENA").

There were several important public figures in his cabinet during his administration. During the first year under democratic rule, he assigned roles to the likes of José Antonio Mora, Luis Barrios Tassano, and future-president Julio María Sanguinetti. Upon dictatorial rule, he worked with Juan Carlos Blanco Estradé, Néstor Bolentini [es], and Alejandro Végh Villegas.

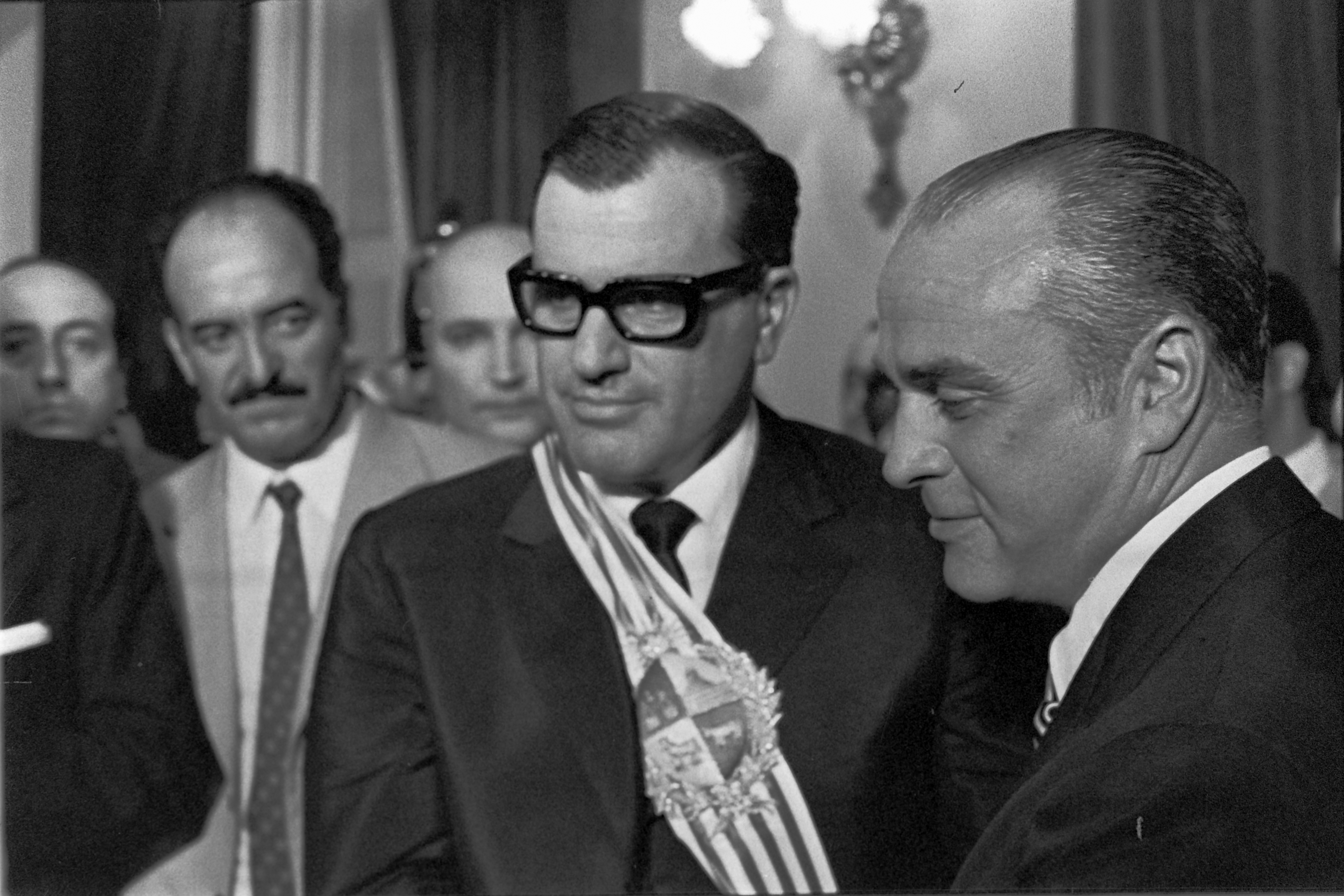
Bordaberry during his assumption of his presidency, 1974.

=== Ousted by military ===
Gradually, Bordaberry became even more authoritarian than his military partners. In June 1976, he proposed a new, corporatist constitution that would have permanently shuttered the parties and codified a permanent role for the military. This was further than even the military wanted to go, and it forced him to resign. Bordaberry then returned to his ranch.

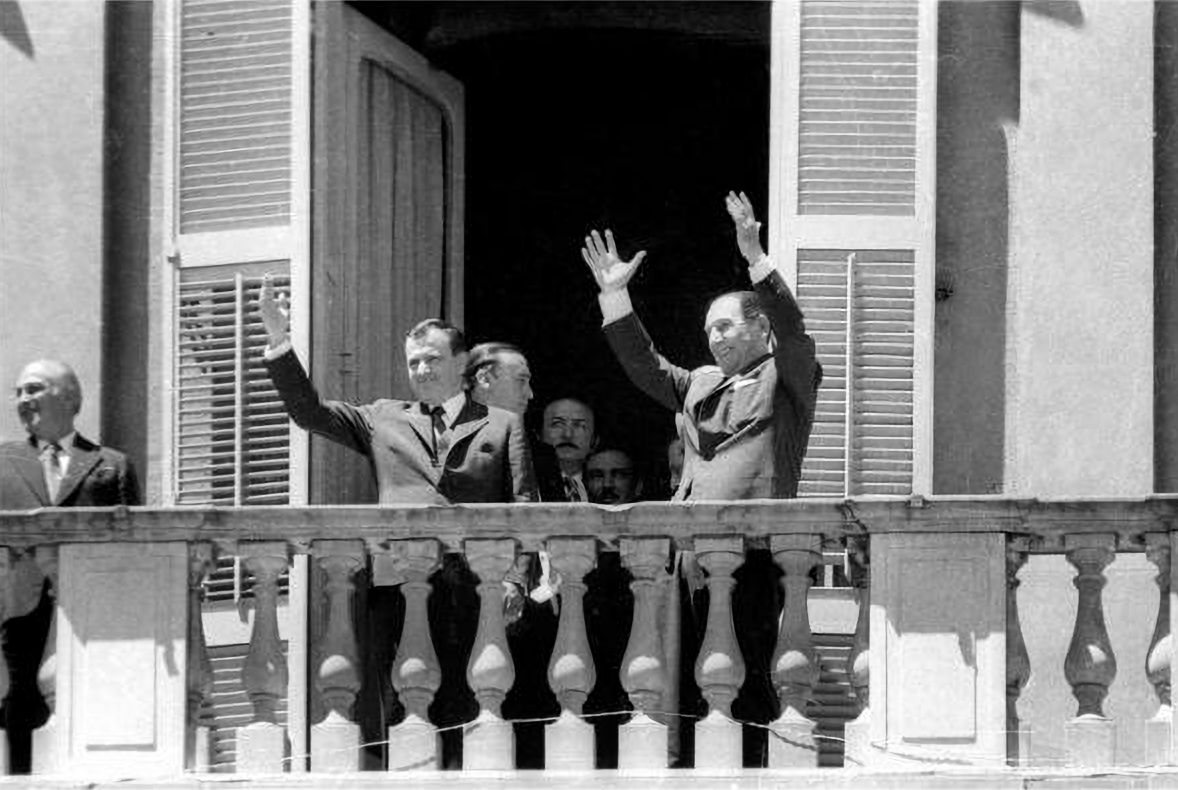
Bordaberry with Juan Domingo Perón, 1974.

== Family ==
Bordaberry was married to Josefina Herrán Puig. Together, the couple had nine children:

- Ana; a textile designer
- Juan Andrés; accountant
- Juan Javier; lawyer
- Juan María; agriculturist
- Juan Martín; businessman
- Juan Pablo; agriculturist
- Juan Pedro; current senator of the Colorado Party and former ministry of tourism under President Jorge Batlle
- María; psychologist
- Santiago; veterinarian, livestock and religious activist

The nine children bore 19 grandchildren through the Bordaberry-Herrán couple.

== Arrest ==
On 17 November 2006, following an order by judge Roberto Timbal, Bordaberry was placed under arrest along with his former foreign minister Juan Carlos Blanco Estradé. He was arrested in connection with the 1976 assassination of two legislators, Senator Zelmar Michelini of the Christian Democratic Party and House leader Héctor Gutiérrez of the National Party. The assassinations took place in Buenos Aires but the prosecution argued they had been part of Operation Condor, in which the military regimes of Uruguay and Argentina coordinated actions against dissidents. Timbal ruled that since the killings took place outside Uruguay, they were not covered by an amnesty enacted after the return of civilian rule in 1985.

On 23 January 2007, he was hospitalized in Montevideo with serious respiratory problems. Because of his health problems the judge Paublo Eguern ordered that Bordaberry be transferred to house arrest. From 27 January he served his prison term in the house of one of his sons in Montevideo. On 1 June 2007, an Appellate Court confirmed the continuation of the case of the murders of Michelini and Gutiérrez Ruiz. On 10 September 2007, another Appellate Court opened a new case to be tried by Judge Gatti for 10 homicides, for violations of the constitution.

On 7 February 2008, the BPS, Social Security Administration, suspended Bordaberry's retirement payments as ex-president of the country.

=== Opposition and support ===
Bordaberry's arrest was generally met with satisfaction and regarded as the end of impunity in Uruguay, a country considered by some to have lagged behind other Latin American nations in this matter. However, former President Julio Sanguinetti has been critical of the one-sided prosecution of individuals involved in the conflict, and there has been lively media debate regarding issues surrounding Bordaberry's arrest.

== Conviction ==
On 5 March 2010, Bordaberry was sentenced to 30 years in prison (the maximum allowed under Uruguayan law) for murder and of being the intellectual author of kidnappings and disappearances of political opponents of the regime, becoming the second former Uruguayan dictator sentenced to a long prison term; in October 2009, Gregorio Conrado Álvarez was sentenced to 25 years. He had also been unsuccessfully tried for violating the constitution in the 1973 coup.

== Death ==
On 17 July 2011, Bordaberry died, aged 83, at his home. He had been suffering from respiratory problems and other illnesses. His remains are buried at Parque Martinelli de Carrasco.

== Honours and awards ==
=== Foreign honours ===
Ribbon	Distinction	Country	Date	Reference
	Collar of the Order of the Liberator General San Martín	Argentina	1974	

== See also ==
- List of political families § Uruguay
- Domingo Bordaberry § Political heritage
- Benito Nardone § Ruralist involvement with the Bordaberrys
- Benito Medero § Minister of Agriculture under President Bordaberry
- Politics of Uruguay
- 1973 Uruguayan coup d'état
- Civic-military dictatorship of Uruguay
- José María Guido - Politician from the Radical Civic Union (UCR) who was appointed president of Argentina by the 1962 coup d'etat

Political offices
Preceded by Jorge Pacheco	President of Uruguay; 1972–1976	Succeeded by Alberto Demicheli
