= Pedro Bordaberry =

Uruguayan political figure

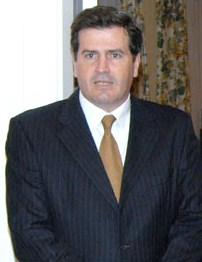

Senator of the Republic
- Incumbent
- Assumed office 15 February 2025
- In office 15 February 2010 – 15 February 2020

Secretary General of the Colorado Party
- In office 2009–2011
- Preceded by: Julio María Sanguinetti
- Succeeded by: Ope Pasquet

Ministry of Tourism and Sports
- In office 13 September 2003 – 1 March 2005
- President: Jorge Batlle
- Preceded by: Alfonso Varela
- Succeeded by: Héctor Lescano

Minister of Industry, Energy and Mining
- In office 13 November 2002 – 12 September 2003
- President: Jorge Batlle
- Preceded by: Sergio Abreu
- Succeeded by: José Villar

Personal details
- Born: Juan Pedro Bordaberry Herrán; 28 April 1960 (age 65) Montevideo, Uruguay
- Party: Colorado
- Spouse: María José Oribe (m. 1985)
- Children: Pedro; Agustín; Matías
- Parents: Juan María Bordaberry; Josefina Herrán
- Relatives: Bordaberry family

Juan Pedro Bordaberry Herrán (born 28 April 1960) is a Uruguayan attorney, lecturer, and politician, serving as Senator of the Republic since 2025. He previously served in the same position from 2010 to 2020, as Minister of Tourism and Sports from 2003 to 2005, and as Minister of Industry, Energy and Mining from 2002 to 2003. A member of the Colorado Party, he was the party's candidate for president in the 2009 and 2014 presidential elections.

== Early life and education ==
Bordaberry was born on 28 April 1960 in the capital city of Montevideo, the fourth child of Juan María Bordaberry and his wife, Josefina Herrán Puig. Bordaberry comes from a family heavily involved in politics; his father, who was of Basque descent, was elected president in 1971 and, in 1973, led a self-coup d'état, dissolving the General Assembly and initiated the civil-military dictatorship. His great-grandfather, Domingo Bordaberry, served as a senator and rancher. His great-grandfather, Santiago Bordaberry (born Jaques Bordaberry) was an immigrant from the French Basque Country who arrived in Uruguay in the second half of the 19th century.

His great-great-grandfather and great-great-aunt Alejo Gregorio and Amalia Victoria Arocena Artagaveytia (the latter of whom was the paternal grandmother of Alberto Zumarán) were nephews of business magnate Ramón F. Artagaveytia Gómez, one of the three Uruguayans who lost their lives during the sinking of the Titanic, and double cousins and second uncles to Emilia Nicanora Artagaveytia Arocena, paternal grandmother of the former National Party senator, Francisco Gallinal.

Bordaberry attended primary school at St. Andrews School, and secondary school at The British Schools and John XXIII Institute. He enrolled at the University of the Republic, from which he graduated in 1986 with a law degree. As a lawyer, he worked mainly in the financial sector. Up until 1 April 2009, Bordaberry was a partner for the Jiménez de Aréchaga, Viana & Brause law firm (now a part of Dentons), a stake that he sold to dedicate himself entirely to his political activity. He also served as a professor for the University of the Republic from 1986 until 1991 and for the Universidad ORT Uruguay from 1995 until 2000.

== Political career ==
Bordaberry began his career in public service as National Director of Industrial Property, reporting to the Minister of Industry and Energy from 1992 to 1994. In 2000 he was appointed Undersecretary of Tourism by President Jorge Batlle and served as Minister of Tourism and Sports from 2003 to 2005. In the 2005 municipal elections, he was a candidate for Intendant of Montevideo, obtaining 26% of the vote, compared to 56% for the Broad Front candidate, Ricardo Ehrlich.

Sometime after his defeat in the municipal elections, Bordaberry left the Lista 15 faction, and in 2007 he founded the Vamos Uruguay faction.

=== 2009 presidential campaign ===
In 2009, Bordaberry was selected as the Colorado Party's candidate for the presidential election.

On 21 March 2009, Bordaberry was formally accepted as presidential candidate for Vamos Uruguay at a ceremony in a stadium in Montevideo attended by an estimated 7,000 supporters. In June 2009, Bordaberry paused his work for the legal practice at which he had been active to focus on the presidential campaign.

In June 2009, Bordaberry was publicly criticised by Colorado Party colleague Luis Antonio Hierro López, a previous ministerial colleague also running for president, due to his surname. In a muted response, Bordaberry noted that Hierro had previously campaigned for Bordaberry as colleagues in government, and had previously been silent about Bordaberry's family background.

In the presidential vote on 26 October, Bordaberry won 17%, finishing behind the National Party and Broad Front candidates, but increasing the Colorado Party's share of the vote. He endorsed Luis Alberto Lacalle for the second round run-off vote that took place at the end of November 2009.

=== 2014 presidential campaign ===
On 9 November 2013, Bordaberry officially launched his presidential campaign for the 2014 presidential primaries. He hired campaign advisers who had worked for Bill Clinton and Barack Obama.

On 1 June 2014, he prevailed in the Colorado Party primary election with 73.62% of the votes, against Senator José Amorín Batlle and former Senator Manuel Flores Silva. In the general election of October, he was in third place with 12.89%, behind Tabaré Vázquez and Luis Lacalle Pou; however, he was re-elected to the Senate.

=== Senate career ===
Bordaberry was elected to the Uruguayan Senate in 2009. In early 2010 Bordaberry called for the establishment of a new university in the interior city of Durazno, with a view to assisting disadvantaged potential students.

In 2017 Bordaberry said he would not run again for president or senator in 2019. After the 2019 presidential primaries in which Ernesto Talvi was confirmed as the presidential candidate of the Colorado Party, and in which the newly created Open Cabildo party obtained a high percentage of right-wing votes, several politicians and the media began to speculate on a possible new candidacy of Bordaberry for the Senate, to avoid a drain of Colorado votes in the general election. However, he withdrew after much opposition from party authorities.

On August 6, 2024, Bordaberry announced his return to active politics and his candidacy for the Senate as head of the Lista 10 electoral list. He confirmed that the Vamos Uruguay sector would cover electoral lists 29 and 2000 led by Gabriel Gurméndez and Tabaré Viera, respectively. In the election, Lista 10 was the most voted electoral list of the Colorado Party, and both Bordaberry and Viera were elected Senators of the Republic for the 50th Legislature (2025-2030). As a member of the Republican Coalition, he publicly supported Álvaro Delgado Ceretta for president in the runoff of the election.

== Political positions ==
=== Economic issues ===
Following the inauguration of the Obama administration in the U.S., Bordaberry said that Uruguayan business leaders seeking to export their goods to the U.S. would encounter greater protectionism from U.S. officials. In August 2009, during difficult relations with Argentina over trade issues, Bordaberry expressed strong reservations about the Mercosur trade pact, arguing that the Chilean model of pursuing bilateral trade pacts would be preferable for Uruguay.

== Political image ==
Pedro Bordaberry's decision to seek a political base in Montevideo contrasts with his father, dictator Juan Maria Bordaberry, who had a long association with rural affairs. Juan Maria Bordaberry was arrested in 2006 in connection with the 1976 assassination of two legislators, Senator Zelmar Michelini and House Leader Héctor Gutiérrez. Pedro Bordaberry has since been vocal in his support. Despite his own family history of dictatorship, Bordaberry has on several occasions accused former president José Mujica of being or striving to become a dictator.

Bordaberry sometimes participates in outdoor public meetings on horseback, or in traditional "gaucho" horseriding attire. He has also contributed to literary criticism of the Argentinian writer Jorge Luis Borges, writing on Borges's theme of the complexity of memory.

== Sport activity ==
Bordaberry is known as a major figure in the sports of Uruguay, having played soccer for his university, basketball for Club Trouville, and rugby for the Old Boys & Old Girls Club. In 1998, Bordaberry, along with Richard Van Rompaey and Jorge Villa, was the president of the Uruguayan Rugby Union. On 21 August 2018, FIFA appointed a "normalisation committee" for the Uruguayan Football Association (AUF). Bordaberry was put in charge, alongside politician Armando Castaingdebat, and former professional association football player Andrés Scotti.

== Personal life ==
He married psychologist and psychotherapist María José Oribe in 1985. The couple have three children: Pedro, Agustín, and Matías. On 15 March 2020, Bordaberry announced that he had contacted COVID-19, making him one of the first people in Uruguay to be affected by the COVID-19 pandemic. He is the author of a number of publications, including his books The Principle of Irretroactivity of the Rules in the Jurisprudence of the Supreme Court of Justice (1991), Ten Years of Seven (1998), Stories from Pueblo Faro by José Ignacio (1999) and Let Them Deny Me (2006).
