= Josefina Herrán =

Uruguayan politician (1930–2024)

First Lady of Uruguay
- In office 1 March 1972 – 12 June 1976
- President: Juan María Bordaberry (de facto from 1973)
- Preceded by: María Angélica Klein
- Succeeded by: Sofía Álvarez Vignoli

Personal details
- Born: María Josefina Herrán Puig; 26 April 1930 Montevideo, Uruguay
- Died: 7 July 2024 (aged 94) Montevideo, Uruguay
- Party: Colorado Party
- Spouse: Juan María Bordaberry (died 2011)
- Relations: Bordaberry family
- Children: María; Juan; Martín; Pedro; Santiago; Pablo; Javier; Andrés; Ana
- Occupation: Politician

María Josefina Herrán Puig (26 April 1930 – 7 July 2024) was the First Lady of Uruguay from 1972 until 1976. She was the wife of Juan María Bordaberry, the constitutionally elected president from 1972 to 1973 and de facto presidential dictator from 1973 to 1976 as the head of the Civic-military dictatorship of Uruguay. Herrán, who was nicknamed "China", was the country's oldest living former first lady at the time of her death on 7 July 2024, at the age of 94.

== Biography ==
Herrán and her late husband, Bordaberry, had nine children, including Pedro Bordaberry, a Senator (2010 to 2020, and currently) and Minister of Tourism from 2003 to 2005 in the cabinet of Jorge Batlle.

In 1973, as the country's first lady, Herrán founded the Social Coordination Volunteer Corps (VCS), a non-profit which continues to develop programs for patients in hospitals, as well as in the community. VCS is made up of approximately 150 volunteers. Herrán served as the organization's president.

Herrán's husband, Juan María Bordaberry, was sentenced to 30 years in prison for violations of the constitution and human rights abuses. He died under house arrest in July 2011 and Herrán survived him for almost 13 years until her own death.
