= Elisa Delle Piane =

Uruguayan politician

- Born: Elisa Delle Piane Iglesias; 27 March 1925; Montevideo, Uruguay
- Died: 25 August 2008 (aged 83); Parque del Plata, Uruguay
- Occupation: Politician
- Political party: Broad Front
- Spouse: Zelmar Michelini
- Children: Elisa, Margarita, Luis Pedro, Isabel, Zelmar, Cecilia, Rafael, Felipe, Graciela, Marcos
- Parents: Luis Aristides Delle Piane (father); Elvira Iglesias (mother)

Elisa Delle Piane (27 March 1925 – 25 August 2008) was a Uruguayan human rights activist and politician, a member of the Broad Front. She was married to journalist and politician Zelmar Michelini.

== Biography ==
Elisa Delle Piane was born in Montevideo on 27 March 1925. She married Zelmar Michelini and the couple had ten children, including senator Rafael Michelini and human rights lawyer Felipe Michelini. Zelmar was assassinated in Buenos Aires during the time of Argentina's military dictatorship, along with the president of the Chamber of Representatives Héctor Gutiérrez Ruiz and Tupamaros Rosario del Carmen Barredo and William Whitelaw Blanco.

She was among the earliest members of the Broad Front and was president of the national pro-referendum commission in Uruguay.

She also dabbled in politics, was a substitute senator, and sat on the same bench as Zelmar Michelini.

Elisa Delle Piane died in Parque del Plata on 25 August 2008, at age 83.
