= Liga Nacional de Accion Ruralista =

Defunct political organization in Uruguay

- Founder: Benito Nardone; Juan Maria Bordaberry
- Founded: 1964

The Liga Nacional de Acción Ruralista (National League for Rural Action) was a Uruguayan organization founded in 1964 by Benito Nardone and Juan Maria Bordaberry (who became President of Uruguay, 1972-1976). It shifted between supporting the National Party and the Colorado Party.

Its antecedent was the Liga Federal de Acción Ruralista, established in 1951. The League was designed to promote and defend rural interests.
