= Bordaberry family =

Uruguayan political family

- Current region: Uruguay
- Origin: French Basque Country, France
- Founded: 1865, Durazno Department; 161 years ago
- Founder: Jacques Bordaberry
- Titles: List: President of Uruguay; Senator of the Republic

The Bordaberry family is a Uruguayan political family that has been prominent in Uruguayan politics and the cattle industry. It is associated with the Colorado Party.

== History ==
The Bordaberry family originated in the French Basque Country region, France. The Uruguayan family branch is descended from Jacques Santiago Bordaberry Oyhamburu, who migrated from the commune of Pagolle to the rural area of the Durazno Department in 1865. There he began to work as a shepherd of flocks of sheep until he managed to acquire a plot of land northwest of the village of Carlos Reyles, which belonged to descendants of Fructuoso Rivera. He founded the "Santa María" ranch and became a stockgrower. In 1900 he began importing Hereford cattle from England.

In 1879, Bordaberry married Isabel Elissondo, who was also of French-Basque descent. They had five children: Santiago, Isabel, Maclovia, María and Domingo. In 1916 the family acquired the "El Paraíso" ranch, and in 1937 the first artificial insemination of sheep in South America was carried out there.

Domingo Bordaberry managed the family ranch as a stockgrower, as well as a lawyer and politician. A member of the Colorado Party, he belonged to the ruralist faction, which initiated the Bordaberry family's long association with rural affairs. He was married to Elisa Arocena Folle, with whom he had four children between 1927 and 1931, Domingo, Juan María, Luis Ignacio and Elisa.
