= Tabaré Viera =

Uruguayan politician

Tabaré Viera Duarte
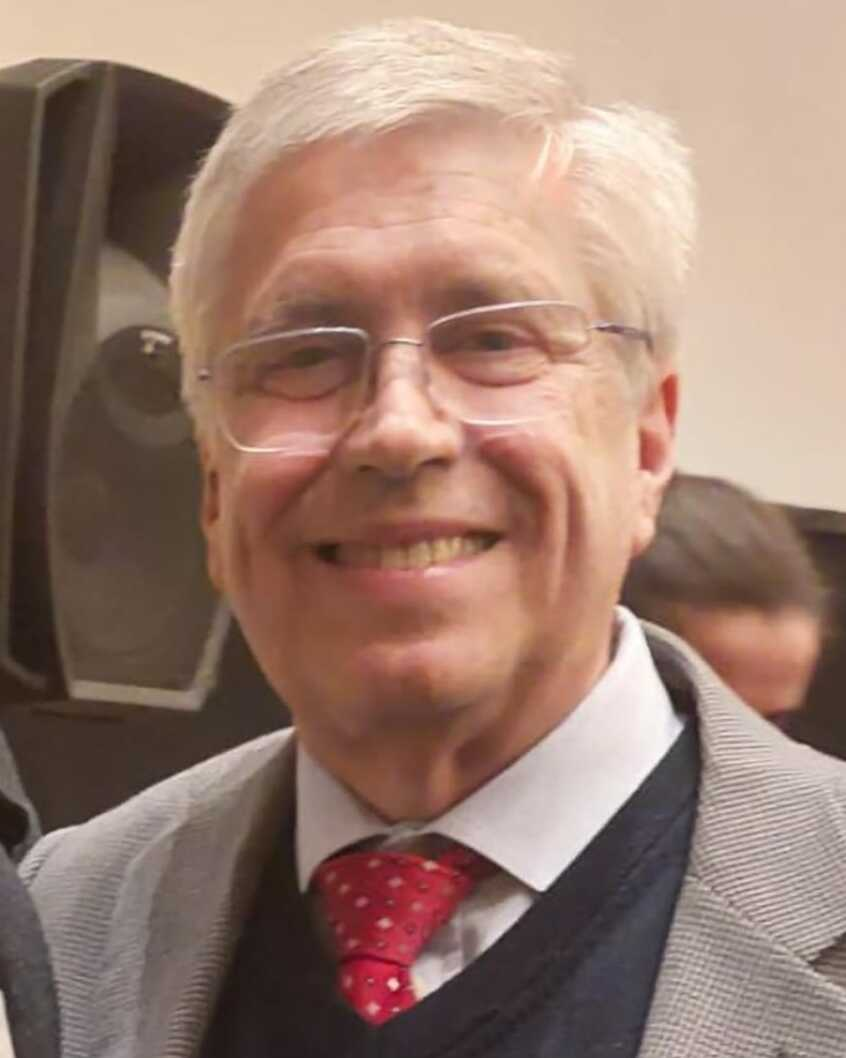

Minister of Tourism of Uruguay
- In office 23 August 2021 – 11 March 2024
- President: Luis Lacalle Pou
- Preceded by: Germán Cardoso
- Succeeded by: Eduardo Sanguinetti

Senator of the Republic
- In office 20 October 2020 – 23 August 2021
- Preceded by: Julio María Sanguinetti
- Succeeded by: Raúl Batlle Lamuraglia

Representative of Uruguay for Rivera
- In office 15 February 2010 – 15 February 2015

Intendant of Rivera
- In office 2005–2009
- Preceded by: María Terrón
- Succeeded by: Marne Osorio
- In office 13 July 2000 – 2005
- Preceded by: Asdrúbal Vázquez
- Succeeded by: María Terrón

President of the National Administration of Telecommunications
- In office 1998–2000
- Preceded by: Ricardo Lombardo
- Succeeded by: Fernando Bracco

Personal details
- Born: 7 April 1955 (age 71) Rivera, Uruguay
- Party: Colorado Party
- Occupation: Politician

Tabaré Viera Duarte (born 7 April 1955) is a Uruguayan politician of the Colorado Party (PC), who served as Minister of Tourism from August 23, 2021, to March 11, 2024, under president Luis Lacalle Pou. He previously served as Senator of the Republic from 2020 to 2021 and from 2010 to 2015, as National Representative from 2015 to 2020 and as Intendant of the Rivera Department from 2000 to 2009. He was a candidate in the 2024 Colorado presidential primaries for president of Uruguay.

== Political career ==
He was elected for the first time to the Chamber of Representatives in the general election of 1984, in which he participated supporting Dr. Altivo Esteves for the Intendancy of Rivera and Julio María Sanguinetti for the presidency of the Republic. In the 1989 election he failed to be reelected, and during the Luis Alberto Lacalle administration he was part of the board of the State Sewage & Water Works (OSE) representing the Colorado Party.

After the death of Altivo Esteves, Viera replaced him as the main leader of Foro Batllista in Rivera Department. He ran unsuccessfully for Intendant of Rivera in the 1994 elections, being defeated by Walter Riesgo of the Crusade 94 sector of his party.

From 1995 to 1998, during the second presidency of Julio María Sanguinetti, he held the position of Vice President of the National Administration of Telecommunication (ANTEL), and after the resignation of Ricardo Lombardo to contest the presidential pre-candidacy of the Foro Batllista in 1998, assumed the presidency of the interim until February 2000. In the municipal elections of that year, he was elected Intendant of Rivera.

In the 2004 presidential election, Viera was Guillermo Stirling's running mate. That year, the Colorado Party suffered the worst defeat in its history, obtaining just 10.36 per cent of the vote. In 2005 he ran again for the post of Intendant of Rivera, being elected for the second time, as the only candidate for his party in the country.

In the 2009 presidential primaries, he supported the pre-candidacy of Luis Hierro López. Viera was the most voted in Rivera, the only department in which Pedro Bordaberry did not obtain a majority of the votes of the Colorado Party. In the general election he integrated the ballot of Propuesta Batllista, as the second candidate after José Amorín Batlle; and as the first candidate for the deputation of the sector of him by the Rivera Department, being elected and opting for the bench of senator. In 2014 he lost his senatorial seat, but was elected National Representative.

In June 2015, he created a new sector within the Colorado Party called Espacio Abierto ("Open Space"), also made up of the Intendant Marne Osorio and the National Representative for Montevideo Conrado Rodríguez. He stated that he wanted to "bring together the Batllista movements of the Colorado Party."

On 23 October 2020, he assumed the senatorial seat that belonged to Julio María Sanguinetti, who retired from politics. On August 23, 2021, he took office as Minister of Tourism, after the resignation of Germán Cardoso.

== Minister of Tourism ==
Following the resignation of Germán Cardoso on 20 August 2021, Viera was announced as his successor on the 23rd by the general secretary of the Colorado Party, Julio María Sanguinetti. One of his first actions as minister was to coordinate the gradual opening of the borders.
