= Ruralism (Uruguay) =

Agrarian political ideology in Uruguay

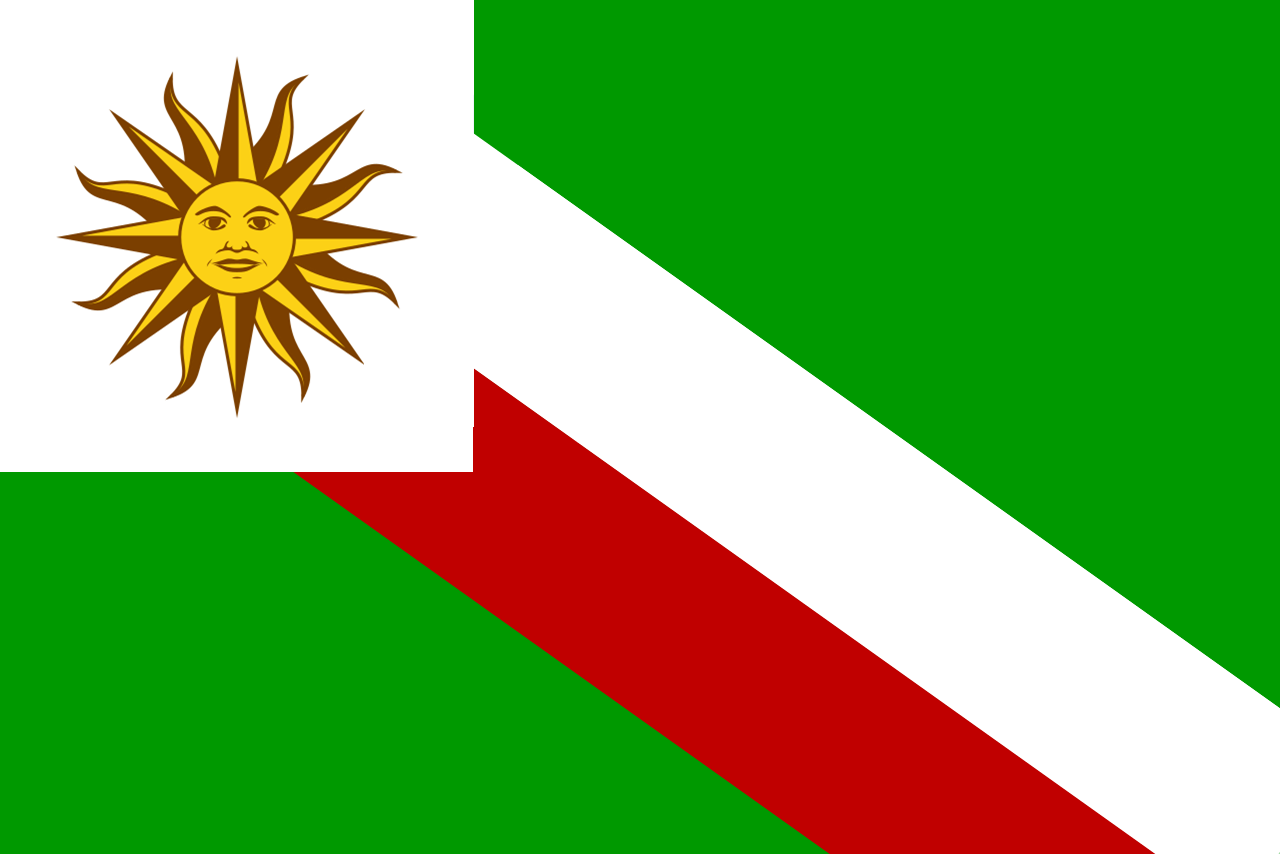
Flag used by Uruguayan ruralists, based on the national flag of Uruguay. The green background represents the countryside, while the white and red lines are a symbol of the Blanco and Colorado parties.

Ruralism (Spanish: Ruralismo) is a right-wing traditionalist political ideology in Uruguay.

Ruralists defend the traditional Latin American agrarian economic model based on extensive livestock production, liberal capitalism, social conservatism and fiscal austerity, vindicating the hacienda and estancia system. Traditionally associated with the rural population and the interests of landowners, the movement has been present both in the Blanco and Colorado factions as well as in economic pressure groups or short-lived political parties.

== Ideology ==
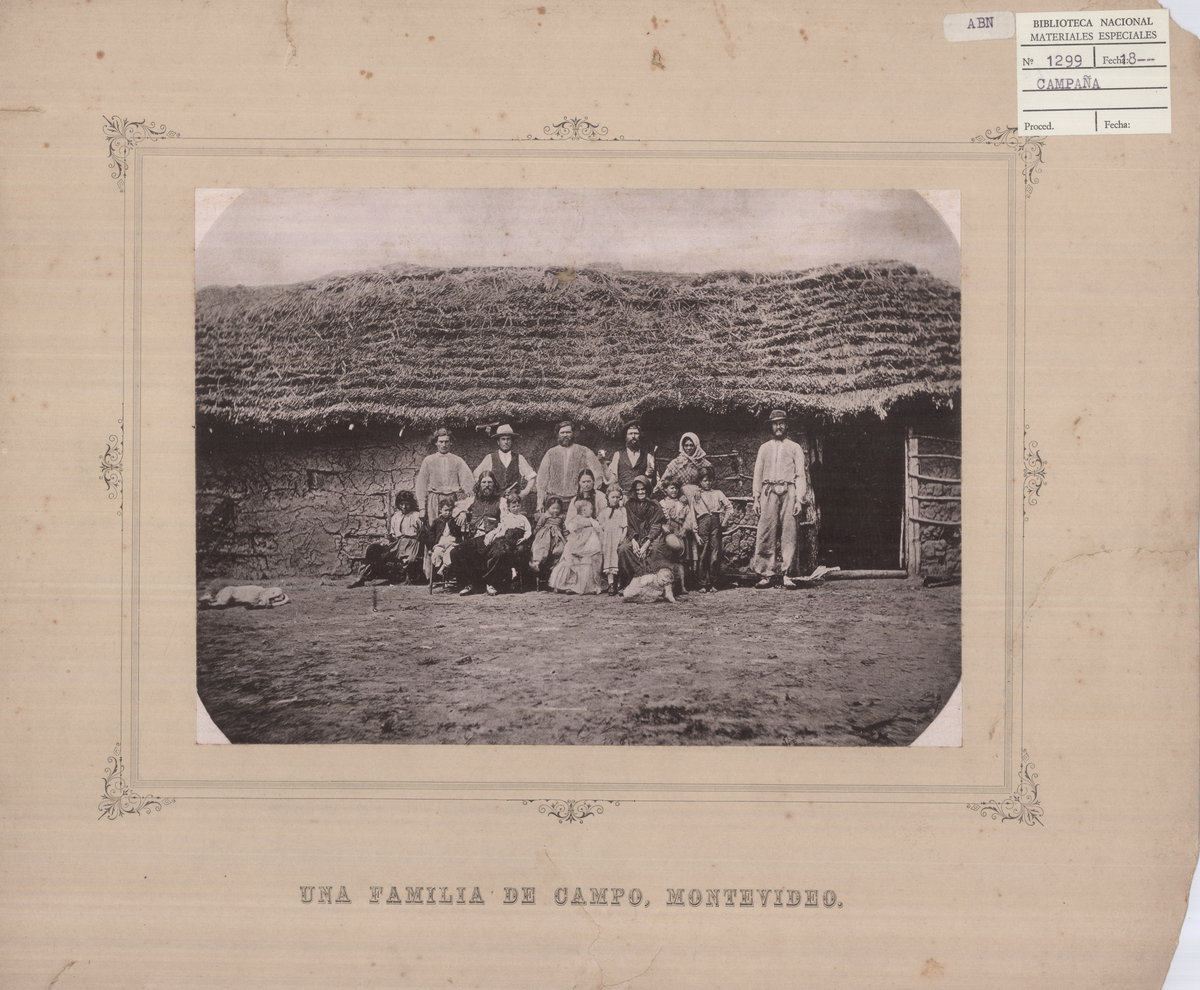
Uruguayan peasant family (1890)

Uruguayan ruralism can be traced back to the 19th century, despite its largest extent was achieved in the 20th century. The movement has been placed by scholars among the liberal-conservative opposition to the social reforms of José Batlle y Ordóñez.

Ruralism sees the large Uruguayan countryside as the main comparative advantage of the country in the global market. Therefore, the movement considers rural development as the ideal economic model for the country and rejected the import substitution industrialization program promoted by the 20th-century governments.

Ruralists are fiscally conservative and hold positive views of the early Uruguayan fiscal policy, in which there were almost no direct taxes except for a rarely collected property tax. Ruralists firmly opposed the various tax reforms enacted by Batlle, most of which were mainly focused on rural landowners and greatly increased the governmental revenue. The movement was also against progressive taxation, considering it immoral and calling it "fiscal larceny".

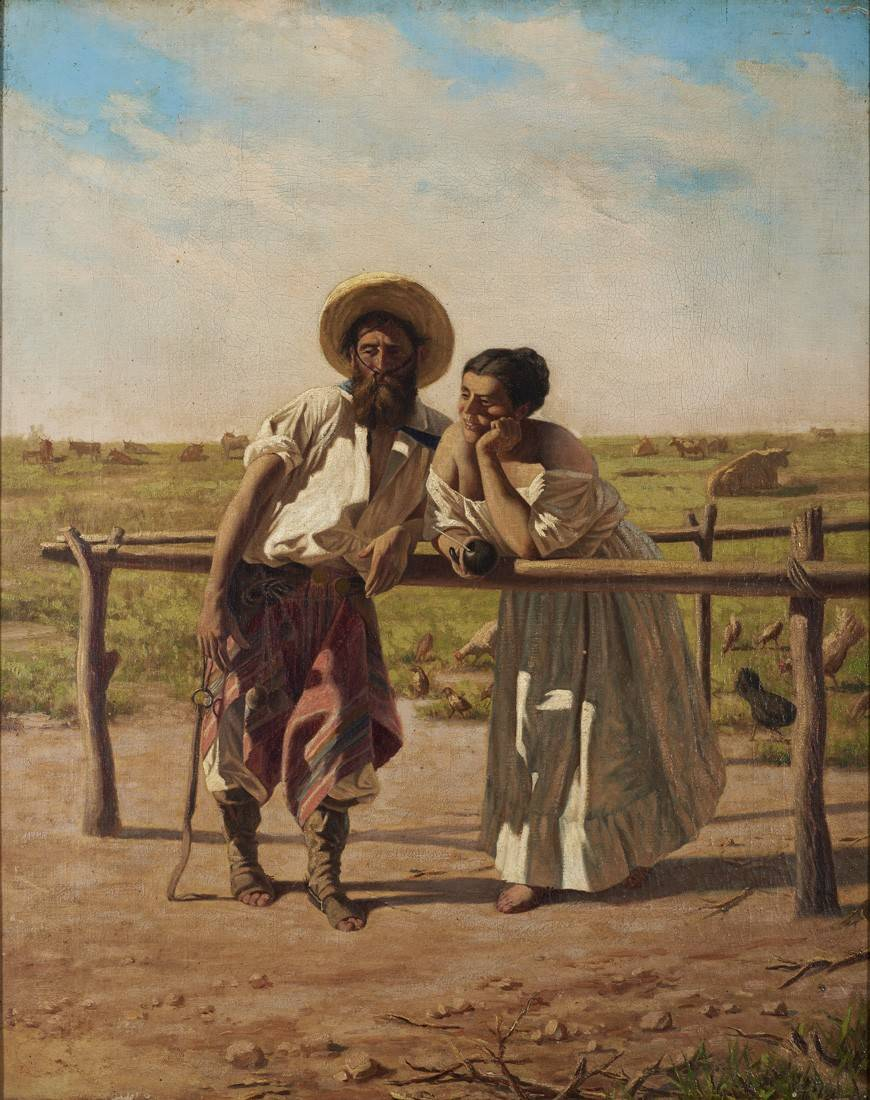
Uno de los tres chiripás by Juan Manuel Blanes (1881)

Ruralists vindicate the rural population as people who appeal to "their own efforts" and kept "physical and moral health" in contrast to hedonistic, materialistic and "corrupted" urban citizens. In 1933, while calling for the March on Montevideo demonstration, El Debate newspaper stated:

Montevideo, epicurean and materialistic, official residence of the Colegiado, fatal headquarters of that legislature that keeps imposing taxes (...), nest of predacious politicians (...) Montevideo, egoist and sensuous, that does not want to see the terrible evils the countryside is suffering, that disdains its pains (...) Just then shall Montevideo wake up from its comfort and the oligarchs shall understand (...) that their pleasures are at risk!

The main aspect of the Uruguayan ruralist rhetoric is based on a supposed attack by a lavish, disorderly, improductive and spendthrift city on a productive, communitarianist and morally superior agrarian society. The defense of rural interests, therefore, would imply anti-statist positions that stopped the aggressive taxation and economic intervention policies by which the government sought to finance its bureaucratic apparatus and drift resources from the countryside to the urban areas. Ruralists have historically shown contempt towards public servants and professional politicians who "live out of the state budget" and "envy" the meritocratic prosperity achieved by the rural population.

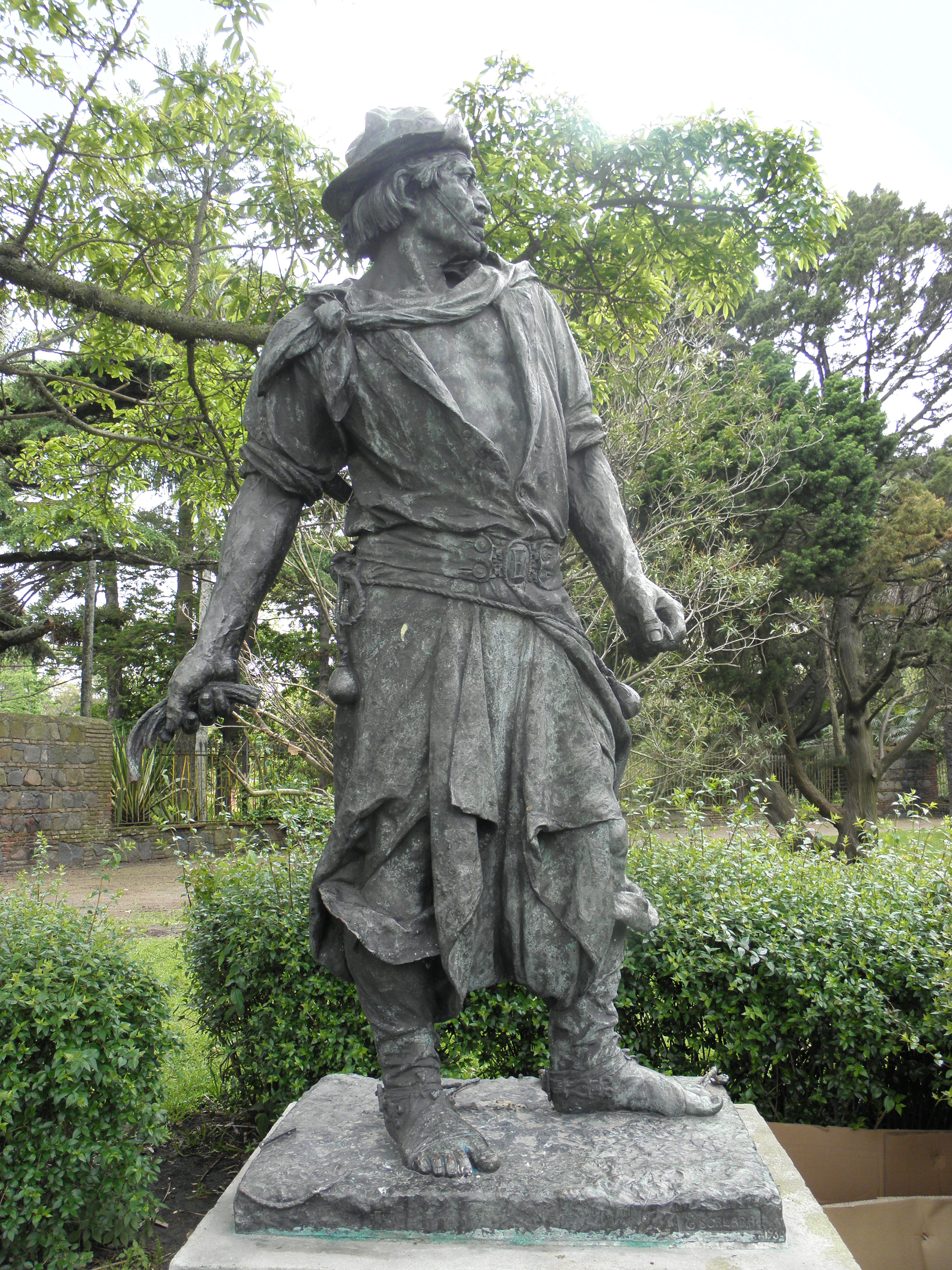
El peón de estancia, monument to rural workers.

Early ruralists saw morality as deriving from the "soil and blood" and not out of abstract reason, considering that the rural society naturally made citizens virtuous due to its demand of hard work and honesty, in contrast to an urban context that promoted immorality. Daily life at rural areas theoretically built people's character and kept them away from sloth and indecency. As Luis Alberto de Herrera stated, ranches were seen as "workshops of rightful men, home to work and noblesse, where there is no place for idleness, and where no evils can be learned" and a "synonym of decency, of honesty, of traditional hospitality, of decorum and serene joy, to sum up, of happiness". Landowners were praised for defending their workers from illness, gambling and drunkness, "evils" that ran rampant in poor towns. Herrera pointed that "an hacendado must be a constant apologist of the most excellent sobriety among his peons". Ranches were therefore seen as "cradle" of the local civilization and of traditional values, and its social prevalence was key for the future of the country and its alleged "rural destiny".

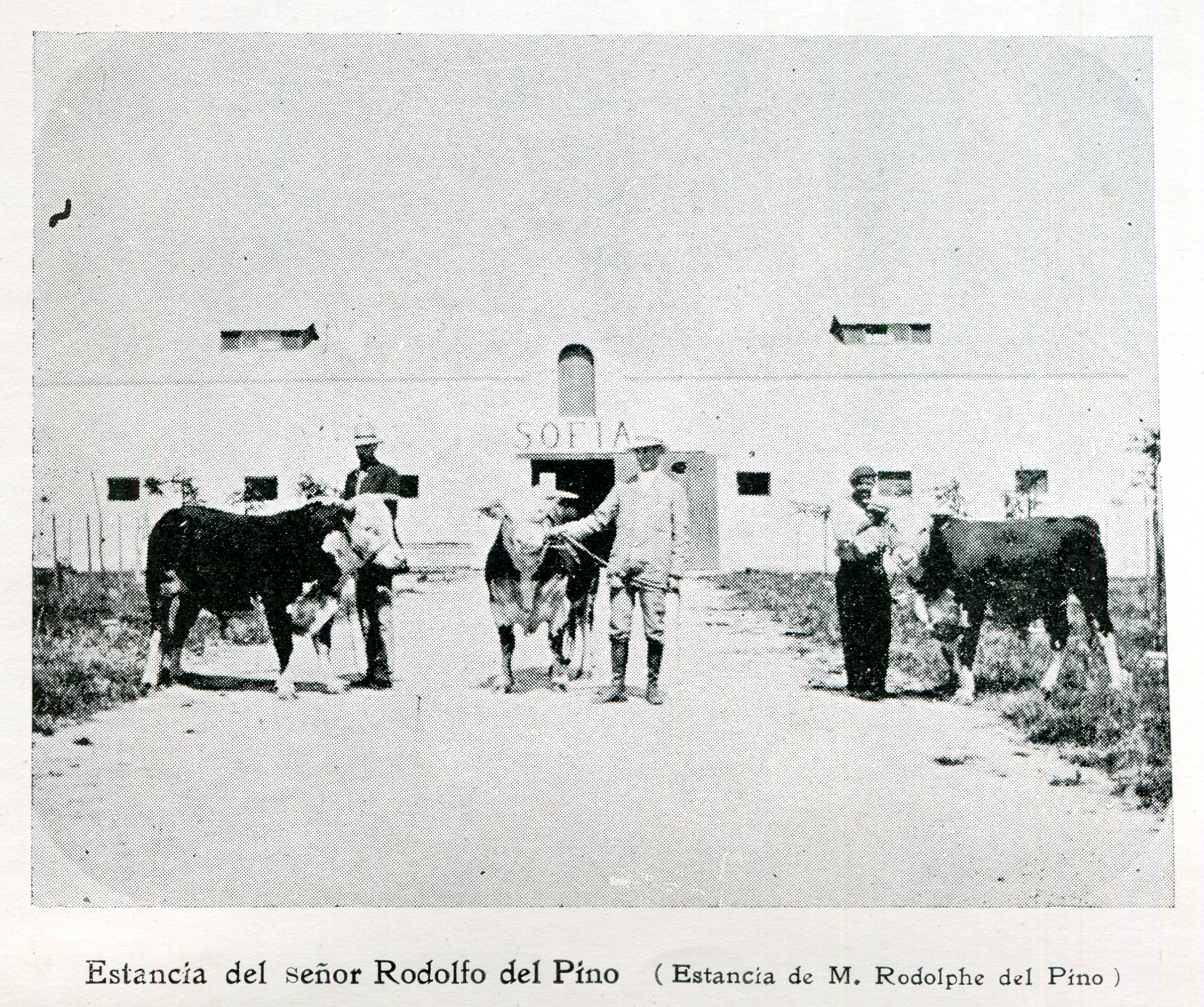
Estancia of Mr. Rodolfo del Pino (1910)

Ruralism is radically against any sort of redistributive land reform and defends the traditional estancia land ownership model, as well as the right to property. Ruralists hold a favourable view of cattle ranchers, defending their economic and social role, and consider livestock production as a positive activity both for the national economy and those who practise it, contradicting the developmentalist projects that tried to promote intensive farming.

Ruralist thought has been deeply influenced by European liberalism and early capitalist economics and morality. Most ruralist favoured laissez-faire economics, despite some minor factions defended the creation of an agrarianist dirigist system.

Ruralists denied the existence of class conflict in the countryside, considering that the presence of a unifying "rural culture" made estancias into a harmonious "great family" with no conflicting interests between peons and landowners. Herrera summed up his beliefs on the topic by describing the estancia of his parents:

We were an ordered and discrete family. Our doors were guarded by old criollo traditions, that are the honour of the Hispanic people. We lived happily on our austere averageness. The employer was the best friend of his workers. They were united by the love for work. The children of the peons of old were risen among those of the estanciero, calling each other "tú" (Spanish informal pronoun); and so it would be always on every scale of life. Those poor were less poor than they are now, but there was less display. We believed in order and in happy abundance, without surprises at our hearts and no fevers in our bodies. But then the reformists came, and after laughing out loud of that patriarchal composure, which they saw as a sign of backwardness and imbecility, they started to break it up.

== History ==
=== Militarism ===
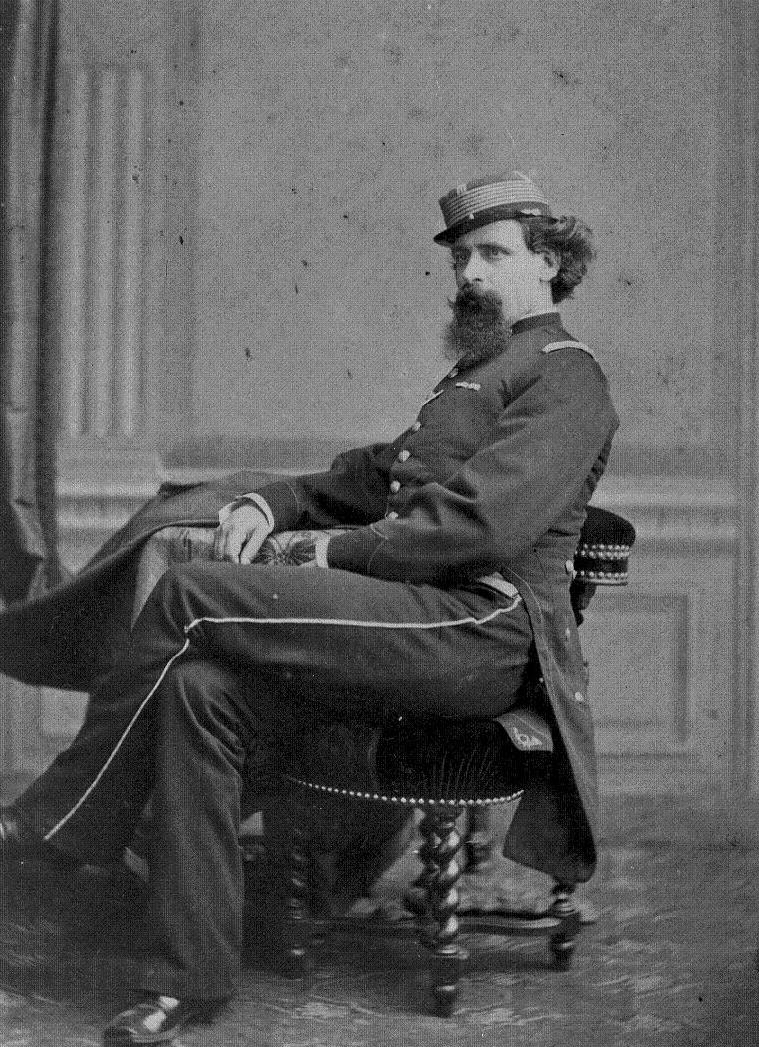
Colonel Lorenzo Latorre, dictator of Uruguay (1876–1880)

The development of capitalism in Uruguay in the late 19th century was a complex and slow process due to the heavy political turmoil the country had experienced since its independence. Despite most of the countryside belonged either to individual landowners or to the state, the boundaries between different estancias were unclear and the constant civil wars hindered the country's agrarian modernization and rural investment.

After the economic devastation caused by the Revolution of the Lances (1870–1873), most of the Uruguayan economic elite and Blanco caudillos supported a coup d'état by president Pedro Varela and colonel Lorenzo Latorre with the aim of establishing a militaristic government that would impose social peace and modernize the national economy. Latorre finally took power in 1876, starting a period known as Militarism.

During the dictatorial rule, the state implemented an economic model based on the export of primary goods, using the military apparatus to stabilize the country and secure the right to property. The birth of a new system started the political involvement of rural ranchers, who actively collaborated with the regime to defend their interests.

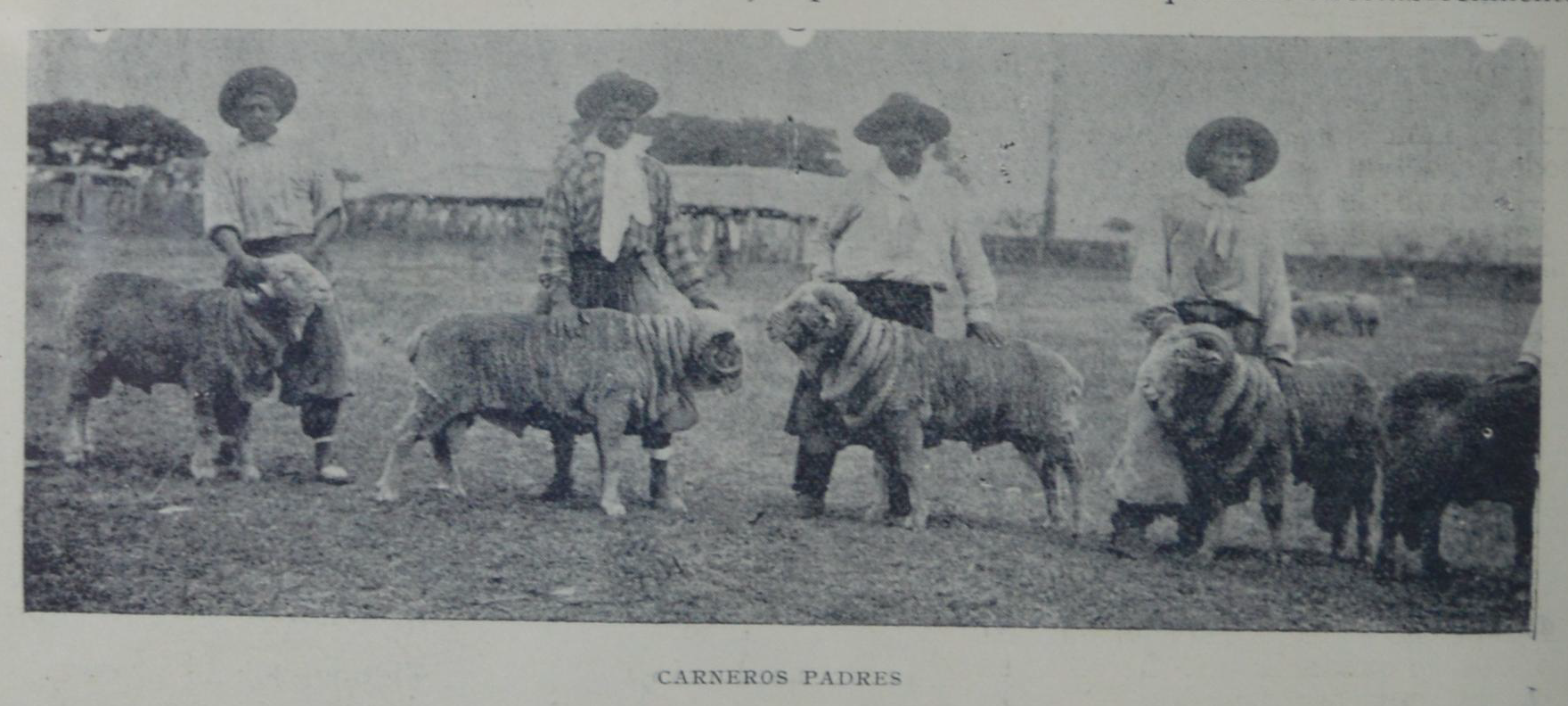
Rams used for breeding (1901). The so-called "Revolution of Wool" (Revolución del Lanar) transformed traditional production methods.

The modernization process, actively promoted by rural landowners, caused a series of economic and social changes that consolidated the agro-export model. Land ownership was greatly concentrated, what favoured the implementation of the latifundio-minifundio land tenure structure.

The introduction of sheep farming and of selective breeding improved exports and national income, making extensive farming the most common productive activity in the country. Lastly, the development of a wage labour system strengthened rural capitalism.

The agro-export model would be the national economic system until the early 20th century, when it was replaced by statist industrialization.

==== ARU ====
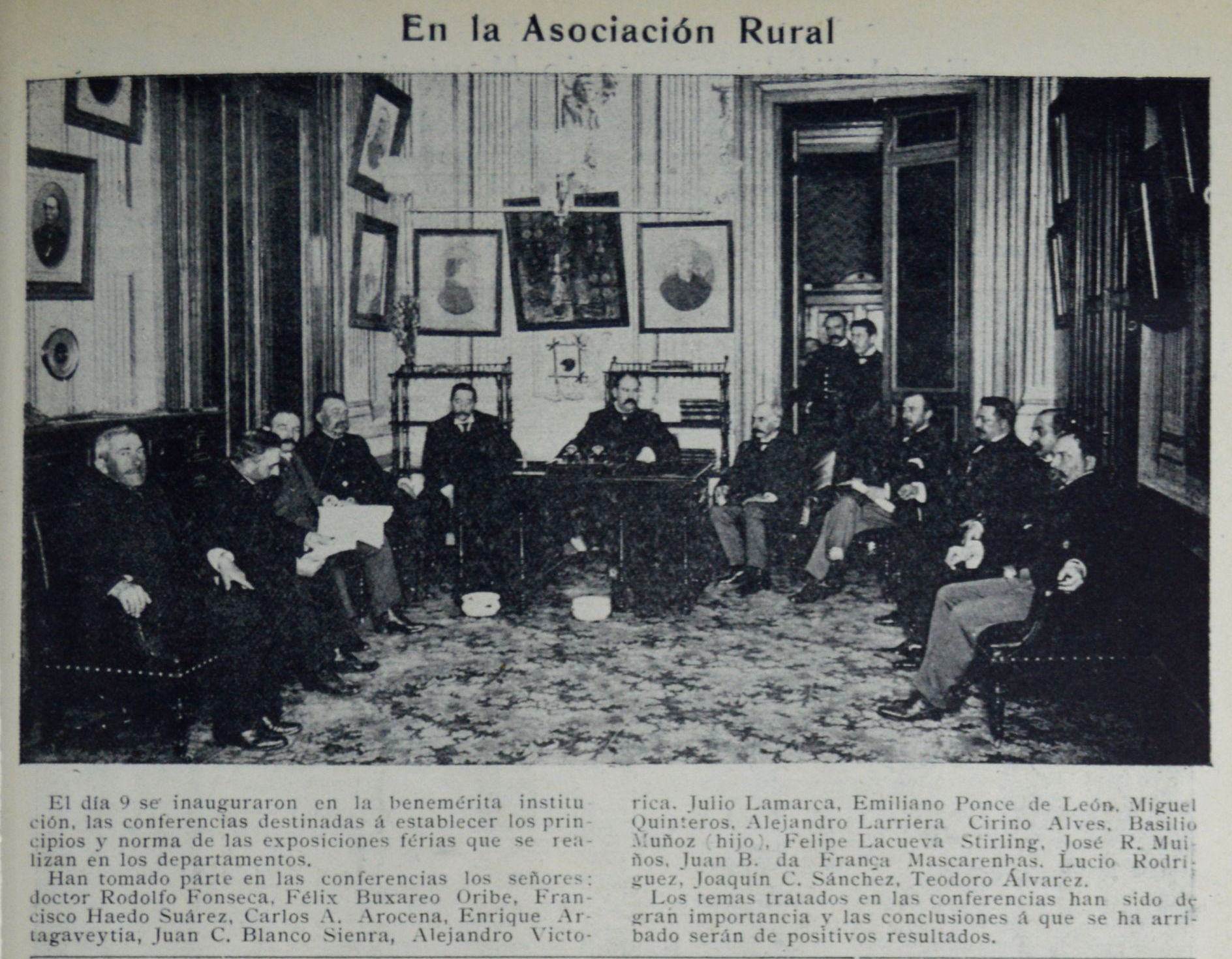
Members of the Rural Association of Uruguay in a meeting.

The modernization process was supported by the creation of the most powerful rural board of trade, the Rural Association of Uruguay (Spanish: Asociación Rural del Uruguay) in 1871.

The ARU advocated for a well defined agenda, and pressed the government for a series of measures that were in most cases carried out. The Association promoted the development of public work projects, the creation of professional armed and police forces, as well as a legal reform.

During its early years, the Association supported scientific research in the Uruguayan countryside and founded its own laboratory in 1898. The guild also owned a library with more than 3,000 tomes.

The following governments after the end of the military dictatorship gradually distanced themselves from the Association.

=== Revolution of 1904 ===
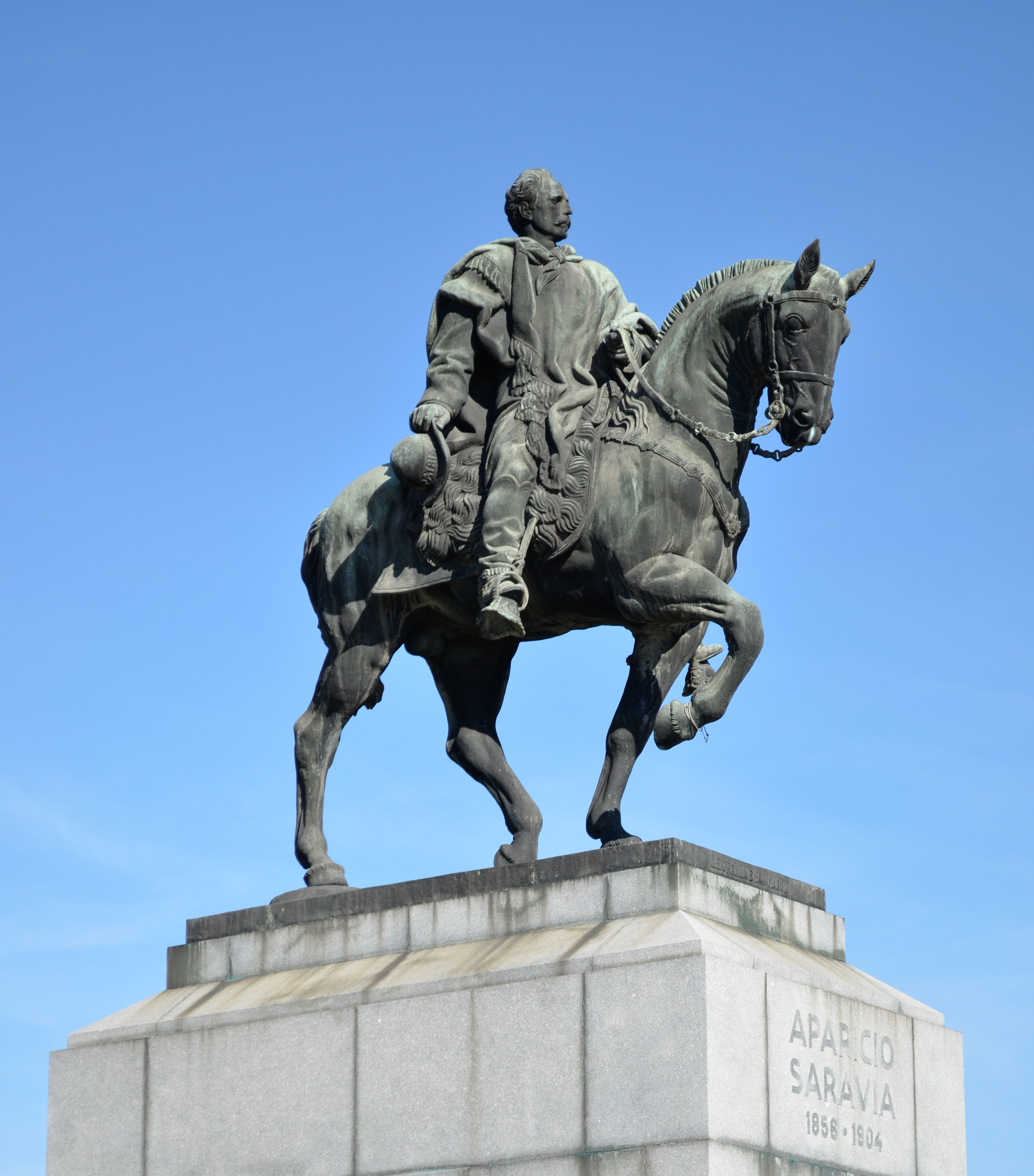
Monument to General Aparicio Saravia in Montevideo

The Revolution of 1904 was a peasant revolt led by General Aparicio Saravia against the Colorado government of José Batlle y Ordóñez. Saravia opposed the reformist policies of the government, and supported the preservation of an economic model based on the countryside. Saravia had triumphed in a previous revolt in 1897 in which he had taken control of the local police, what gave him a large military strength. Unlike most of the Uruguayan ranchers, who had demilitarized their territories since the modernization, Saravia was able to rise a powerful army at his northern estancia "El Cordobés", from where he had also taken part in the Brazilian Federalist Revolution.

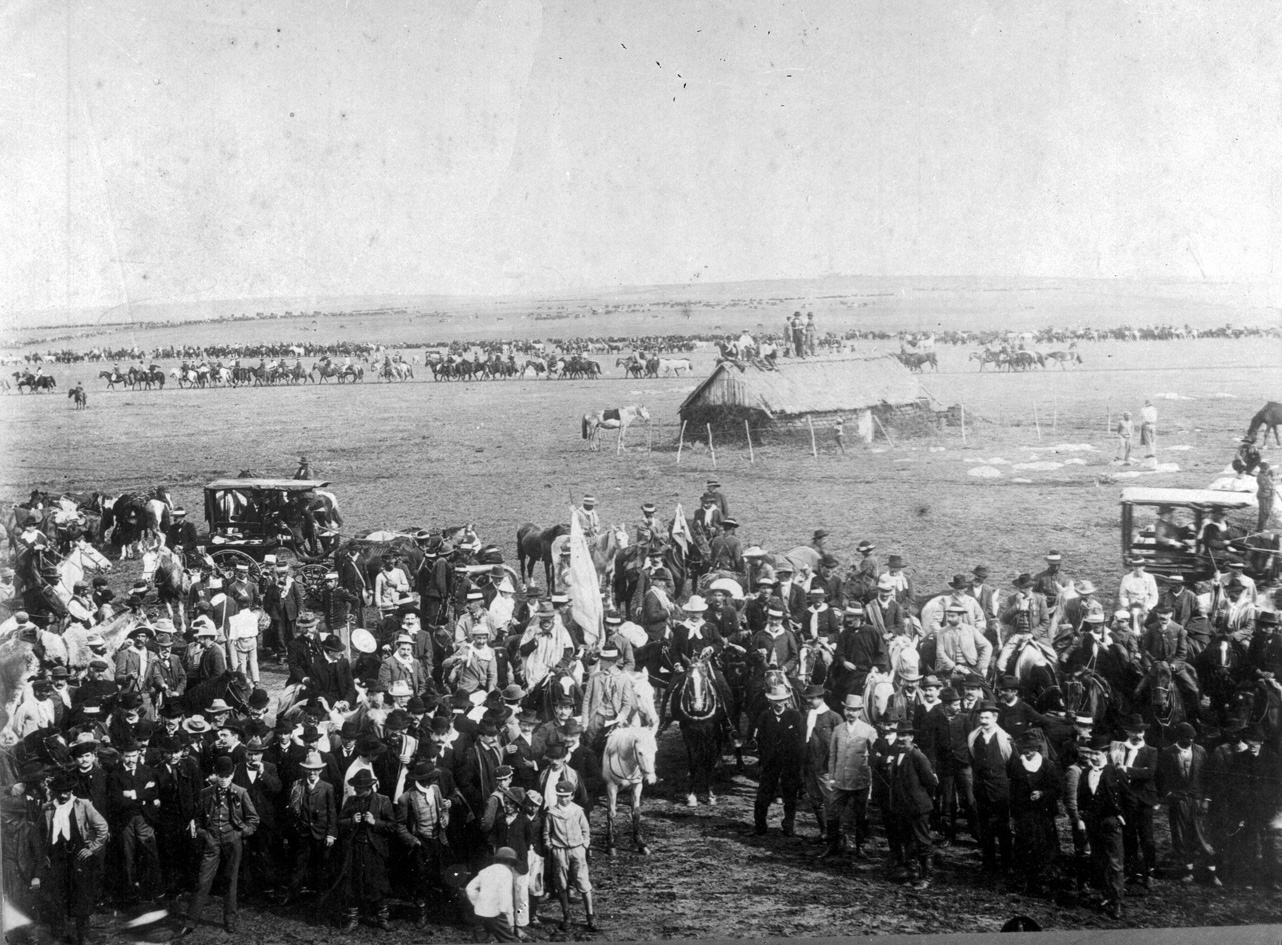
Aparicio Saravia on a military parade (1903)

After Batlle broke the Pact of the Cross (Spanish: Pacto de la Cruz), by which it was compelled to let blanco politicians to take part on his government, Saravia ordered all ranchers to sell their cattle, levy their men and go to "El Cordobés" in order to take part in an "armed protest". Saravia recruited 15,000–20,000 men and, after the government refused to negotiate, launched the revolution.

The Blanco Party had formed an organized army with a strong hierarchy oi the previous years, but a fair amount of the revolutionaries were not associated with the party and were mere peasants expulsed from their lands after the modernization. Many soldiers used the mottos "Aire libre y carne gorda" (lit: free air and fat meat) or "Patria para todos" (lit: fatherland for everyone) as a display of social discontent. The revolution was not limited to political causes, but was mostly motivated by the desire of the impoverished rural population to improve their conditions of living.

Saravia was killed in action in the Battle of Masoller, what caused the end of the Revolution. Saravia has been described as the "epigone" of the ruralist tradition and remains one of the most important historical figures of the Blanco Party.

=== Rural Federation and La encuesta rural ===
In 1915, during the second presidency of Batlle y Ordóñez, ruralist hardliners created the Rural Federation (Spanish: Federación Rural) as a way of taking a more confrontational approach against the government. The foundation of the organization was actively supported by the ARU, as well as by the conservative factions of the traditional parties.

According to Luis Alberto de Herrera, one of its founders and most relevant members, the conservative "alliance of ranchers" was founded with the objective of opposing the "jacobin" policies of batllists, and promote "agrarian nationalism". Ruralists saw batllism as "the worst enemy" that "severed the country" trying to harm the countryside from the "fallacious and deceitful city of the south".

In 1920, the Federation made a national survey called "La encuesta rural" to study the situation of the countryside from a ruralist point of view. The research pointed that the places of worst poverty and moral vice of the countryside were not the estancias, but the rancheríos where most of the unemployed and impoverished population lived. The article concluded, therefore, that estancias could be credited with promoting moral virtue and economic development. The study finished with a call for an educational reform and for a different wage policy.

=== Minor ruralist parties ===
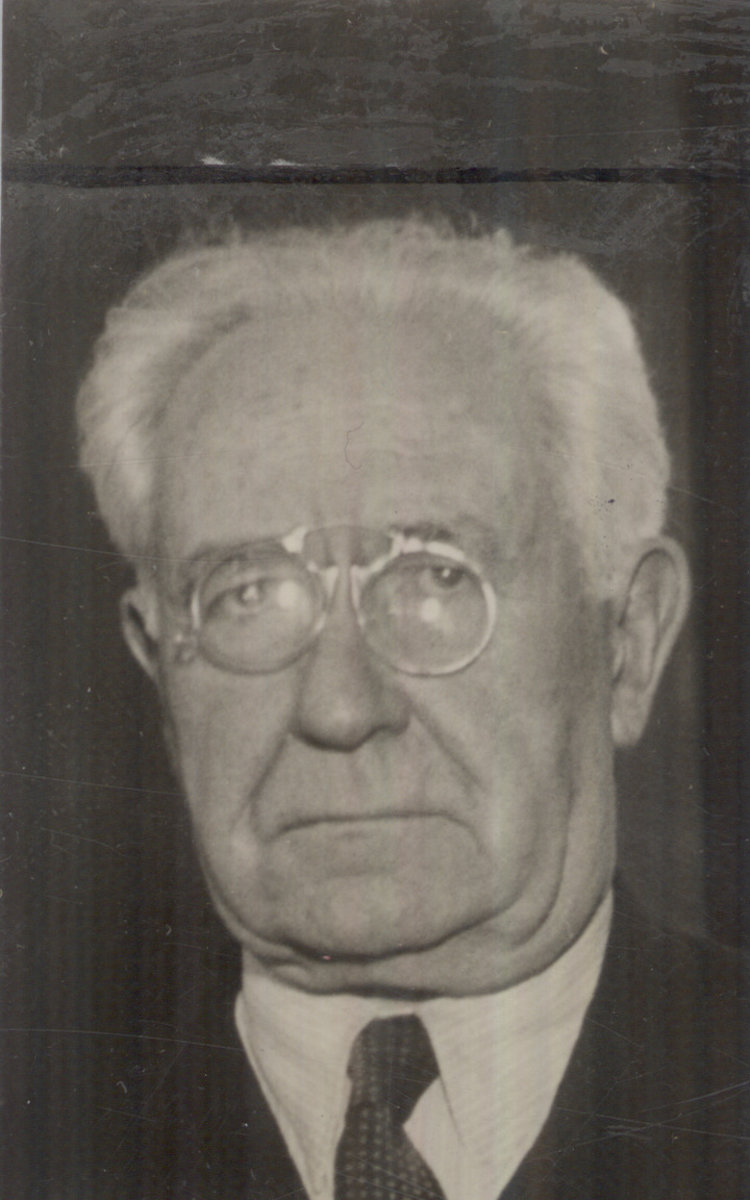
José Irureta Goyena (circa 1930)

After the Constitution of 1918 gave small political parties a better chance of obtaining parliamentary representation, some minor parties attempted unsuccessfully to make use of this advantage to obtain a legislative vocal.

==== Democratic Union ====
In 1919, the leading figure of the Rural Federation José Irureta Goyena founded the Democratic Union (Spanish: Unión Democrática), despite being originally opposed to the creation of a ruralist party. The party was strongly linked to the upper class, what undermined its possibilities of becoming a mass movement. The party failed completely in the following election and did not get a single a deputy, what led to its dissolution.

The idea of creating a conservative party that supported the interests of capitalists against batllist reformism did not have its origins among ranchers but among businessmen. Still, the Rural Federation approved the initiative and Irureta Goyena became the first candidate for deputy for the party.

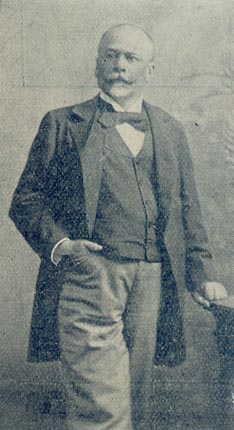
Francisco Piria, Uruguayan businessman (circa 1900)

The Democratic Union directed the El Siglo newspaper as its official press medium. The party was supported by many important business figures of the era such as Francisco Piria, Elías Regules, Enrique Lussich or Julio Mailhos, all of them being candidates to legislative positions. Many foreign businessmen, particularly among the British community as it held most of the nationalized companies, also backed the project.

The ex-presidents of the Rural Federation Alejandro Victorica and Carlos Arocena were also members of the party, as well as the members of the board of directors of the Federation Patricio Lessa, Jorge Wilson, Salvador Sosa, Ladislao Rubio and Antonio Otegui. This caused a conflict inside the Federation, however, as many relevant figures such as Luis Alberto de Herrera or Pedro Manini Ríos did not support the initiative.

The party used expensive propaganda methods not yet seen in the country, that ranged from posters on the streets to a light aircraft that threw leaflets over the city. Paradoxically, the Democratic Union was unable to develop an organized campaign in the countryside, where would have been their most accessible target voters, and only presented its candidates for Montevideo.

The party failed to obtain a deputy as it received only 686 votes. The absolute failure of the project was seen by some analysts as a lesson learned by the Uruguayan economic elite, that started to influence local politics through the already established traditional parties and has not launched any large-scale attempt to create a new party since then.

==== Corporatist parties ====
Two dirigist corporatist parties were later founded amid ruralist circles: the Agrarian Party (Spanish: Partido Agrario) in 1928 and the Ruralist Party (Spanish: Partido Ruralista) in 1936.

Both were born in the middle of an economic crisis, and proposed the development of a state corporatist system akin to that of Fascist Italy as a way to solve the challenges related to the 1929 Wall Street crash. The popularization of corporatist policies and the peak of fascism in Uruguay were incentives for the foundation of the parties.

===== Agrarian Party =====
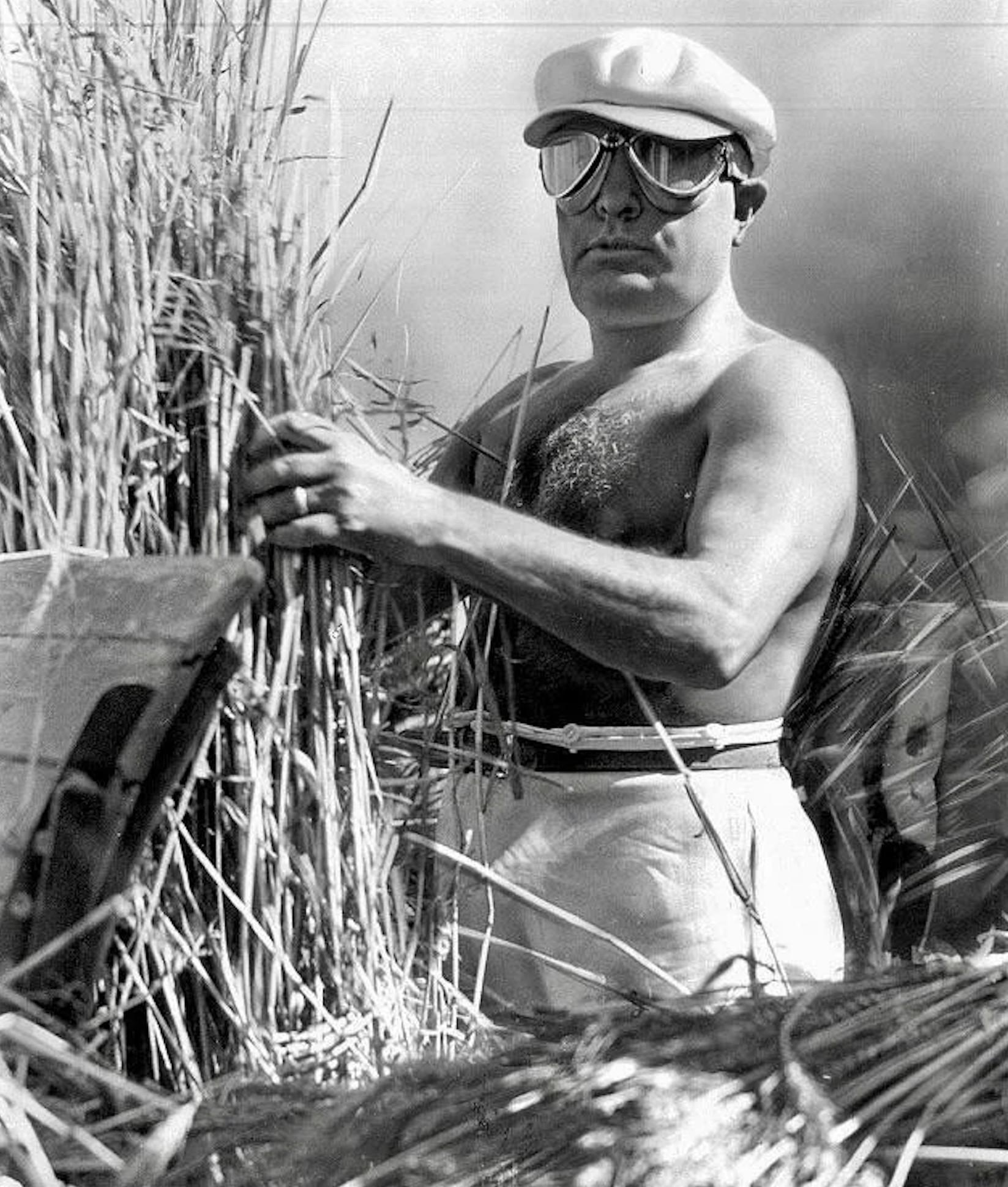
Benito Mussolini characterized as a peasant during the Battle for Grain.

Highly critical of the traditional parties and of professional politicians, the Agrarian Party was founded by Andrés Podestá, a rancher from San José de Mayo who admired Italian fascism, along with many small-scale producers.

The Agrarian Party considered that farmers had too little pressure power due to the division of their votes between the Blanco and Colorado parties. Podestá criticized the lack of representativeness of the Uruguayan Parliament, stating at a radio conference that:

We see among our national representatives a lot of lawyers, many physicians, some engineers, ranchers, journalists and diplomaeds, for the rest can be qualified as people with no office nor benefit. (...) It is evident that, given the activity of those who make politics their profession and a modus vivendi et operandi, it is very difficult and almost impossible that traders, industrialists or farmers may get access to the Parliament. This is so evident on every democratic parliament that no demonstration is needed to prove my assertion.

Unlike traditional ruralists, agrarianists were deeply dirigist and supported a peaceful land reform that would redistribute property through state buying and progressive taxation. A declared follower of Mussolini, Podestá also wanted the state to support industrialization and technological modernization.

===== Ruralist Party =====
The Ruralist Party was founded in Salto in 1936 by powerful cattle ranchers. The party published a nationwide manifesto through press media, attacking professional politicians, asking all rural workers to join and calling them the "only generators of the national wealth". The party directed a newspaper called "La Campaña", and favoured corporatist policies despite being ambivalent towards fascism. The movement was not successful electorally, but was key in the formation of future ruralist groups such as the LFAR.

=== Liga Federal de Acción Ruralista ===
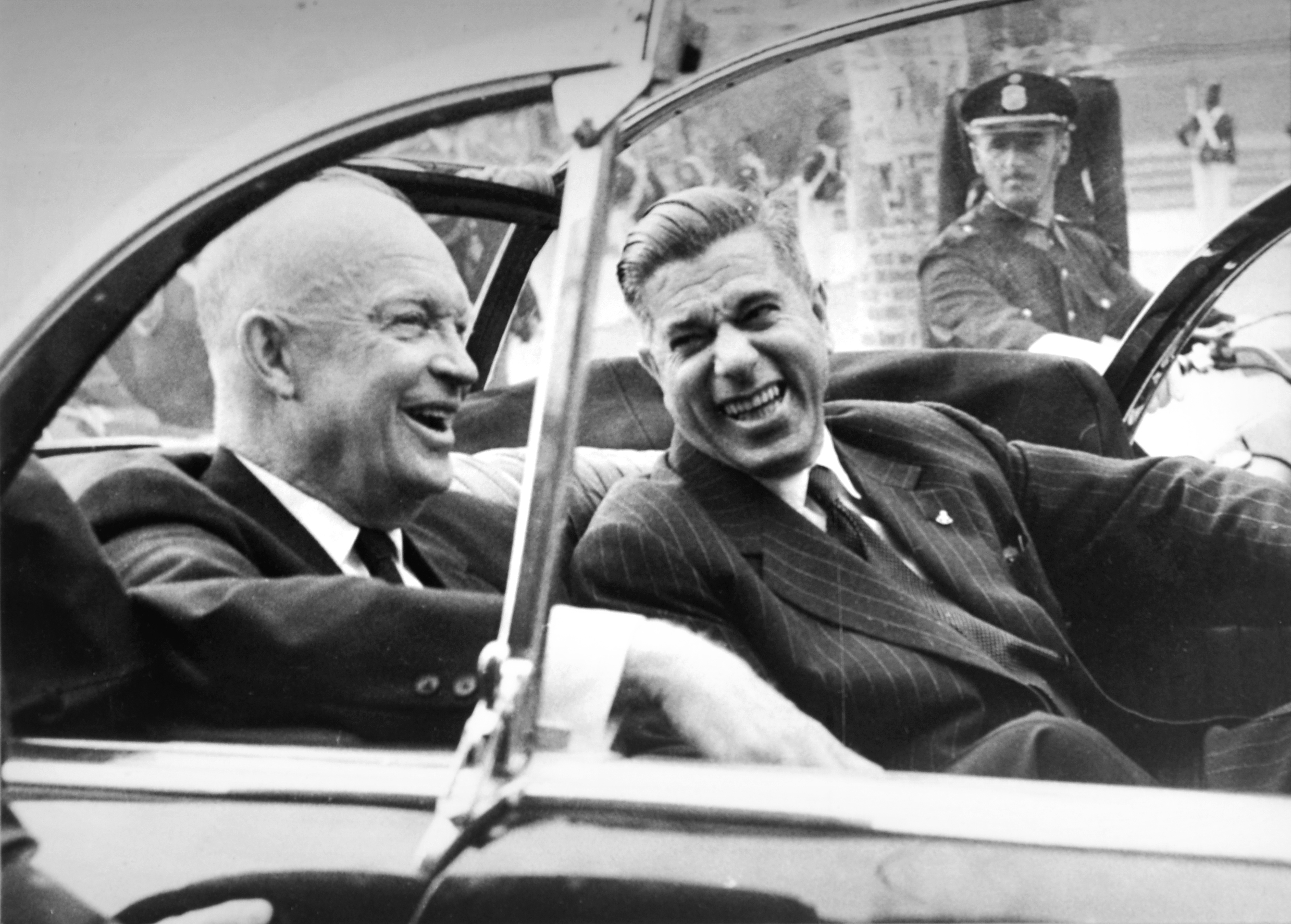
Benito Nardone and Dwight D. Eisenhower (1960)

The Liga Federal de Acción Ruralista (lit: Federal League of Ruralist Action) was a Uruguayan mass movement led by Benito Nardone.

Described as a right-wing populist figure, Nardone was the host of a radio program at CX4 Radio Rural where he broadcast the local news, gave economic advice to rural enterpreuners and expressed his political opinions. Using a folksy and irreverent language, Nardone presented a dichotomy between the "botudos" (lit: boot-wearing), who were the rural workers and small farmers, and the "galerudos" (lit: top hat-wearing), the powerful landlords that directed the Rural Federation.

Nardone's conflicts with the Rural Federation led to the foundation of the LFAR, supported by politician Domingo Bordaberry, as a mass movement with the objective of separating the ruralist ideology from the interests of the upper classes. The movement took its name from the Federal League led by José Artigas as a way to reaffirm its popular character. The League claimed to follow artiguist ideology and considered itself to be above all political parties.

The movement was a heterodox branch of traditional ruralist thought, as it defended not only the possibility of a land reform but was also greatly influenced by Catholic social teaching and reactionary ideology. Still, the League managed to become quickly one of the most important pressure groups in the country, supported by the hyper-personalista leadership of Nardone who presented himself as a charismatic leader. At a grassroots level, ruralists were organized in cabildos that communicated with Nardone to express the different needs the towns were experiencing.

The use of radio diffusion was central to Nardone's campaign as it was the most prevalent mass media in the countryside. The movement was dissolved soon after Nardone's death in 1964.

==== Herrero-Ruralism ====
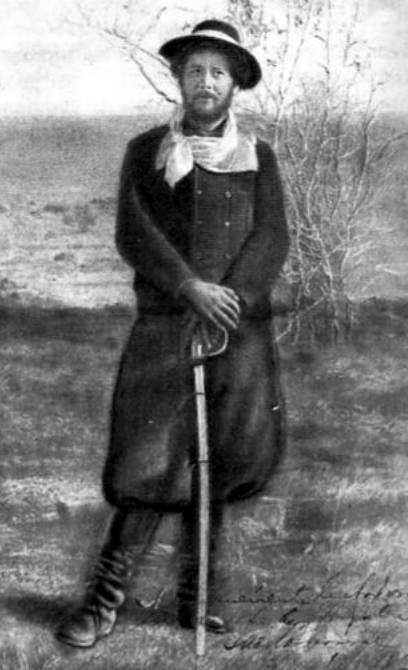
Luis Alberto de Herrera as a young man, wearing traditional attires and the Blanco headband while taking part in the Revolution of 1897.

Ruralism formally rose to power for the 1959–1963 term through an alliance with Herrerist nationalists. The new government sought to put an end to the import substitution model and to go back to a system based in the export of primary goods. It was the first government of the National Party since the overthrow of Atanasio Aguirre in 1865.

Despite their traditional anti-partisan positions, ruralists were easily introduced into the Blanco Party due to their shared contempt towards state industrialization and favourable views of the countryside. Nardone himself held the presidency in 1960. Herrera was a prominent ruralist ideologue and a key figure of the first years of the movement. He was involved in the creation of the Rural Federation on his young years, and was an important militant among rural guilds. Herrero-Ruralists also shared a fervent anti-communism.

The alliance eventually broke and ruralist leaders were expulsed from the party, but their legacy and influence over blanco ideology remained.

=== Modern day ===
Both the Rural Association and the Rural Federation are still active nowadays.

In 2018, a ruralist organization called Un Solo Uruguay was founded in opposition to the economic policies of the Tabaré Vázquez government. The movement acquired widespread reputation after organizing a demonstration with more than 60,000 protestors at Durazno.

Some of the USU protests were endorsed by political candidate and future president Luis Lacalle Pou. The organization was an important pressure group in the 2019 Uruguayan general election.

Most of the movement uses an anti-political rhetoric, despite minor factions have proposed to create a political party.

== See also ==
- Agrarianism
- Agrarian socialism
- Paleoconservatism
- Physiocracy
