= Juan Gelman =

Argentine poet (1930–2014)

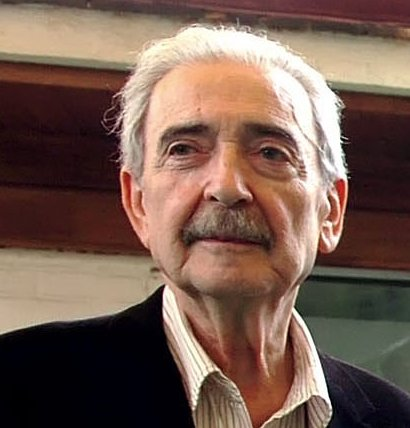
- Gelman in 2007
- Born: 3 May 1930; Buenos Aires, Argentina
- Died: 14 January 2014 (aged 83); Mexico City, Mexico
- Occupation: Poet

Juan Gelman (3 May 1930 – 14 January 2014) was an Argentine poet. He published more than twenty books of poetry between 1956 and his death in early 2014. He was a naturalized citizen of Mexico, where he arrived as a political exile of the Process, the military junta that ruled Argentina from 1976 to 1983.

In 2007, Gelman was awarded the Miguel de Cervantes Prize, the most important award for Spanish-language literature. His works celebrate life but are also tempered with social and political commentary and reflect his painful experiences with the politics of Argentina.

== Biography ==
Juan Gelman Burichson was born on 3 May 1930 in the Villa Crespo neighborhood of Buenos Aires to Jewish immigrants from Ukraine. As a boy, he read Russian and European literature widely under the tutelage of his brother Boris. His father, José Gelman, was a social revolutionary who participated in the Russian Revolution of 1905; he emigrated to Argentina, went back shortly after the October Revolution, and then returned to Argentina for good, disillusioned.

Gelman learned to read when he was three years old and spent much of his childhood reading and playing soccer. He developed an interest in poetry at a very young age, influenced by his brother Boris, who read him several poems in Russian, a language the boy did not know. The experience of reading Fyodor Dostoevsky's Insulted and Humiliated (1861) at age eight made a profound impression on him.

As a young man, he was a member of several notable literary groups and later became an important journalist. He also translated at the United Nations. He was always an ardent political activist. In 1975, he became involved with the Montoneros, though he later distanced himself from the group. After the 1976 Argentine coup, he was forced into exile. In 1976, his son Marcelo and his pregnant daughter-in-law, María Claudia, aged 20 and 19, were kidnapped from their home. They became two of the 30,000 desaparecidos, the people who were forcibly "disappeared" without a trace during the reign of the military junta. In 1990, Gelman was led to identify his son's remains (he had been executed and buried in a barrel filled with sand and cement). Years later, in 2000, he was able to trace his granddaughter, born in a backdoor hospital before María Claudia's murder and given to a pro-government family in Uruguay. The remains of María Claudia have not yet been recovered.

During his long exile, Gelman lived in Europe until 1988, then in the United States and later in Mexico, with his wife, Argentine psychologist Mara La Madrid.

In 1997, Gelman received the Argentine National Poetry Prize in recognition of his life's work. In 2007, he was awarded the Migues de Cervantes Prize; the prize is considered to be the most prestigious award bestowed on a Spanish-language writer. He also had a long career as a journalist, writing for the Argentine newspaper Pagina/12 until his death.

Gelman included Uruguayan police officer Hugo Campos Hermida in a legal suit lodged in Spain for the "disappearance" of his daughter-in-law in Uruguay.

=== His granddaughter ===
At the beginning of the 21st century, Uruguayan president Jorge Batlle Ibáñez ordered an investigation and Gelman's granddaughter, Macarena Gelman, was found. Macarena, who had lived as an adopted child, took the surnames of her parents and started a career as a human rights activist.

=== Death ===
Gelman died at age 83 of complications with preleukemia at his home in the Condesa neighborhood of Mexico City. His granddaughter, Macarena, flew in from Uruguay to attend the funeral. Three days of national mourning was declared by Argentina's president, Cristina Fernández de Kirchner.

== Personal papers ==
Juan Gelman's archive, which includes drafts of writings and a collection of files he kept pertaining to his human rights investigations, is available for research at the Manuscripts Division in the Department of Rare Books and Special Collections at Princeton University in the United States.

== Works ==
=== Published in English translation ===
- Unthinkable Tenderness: Selected Poems, trans.: Joan Lindgren, University of California Press, 1997
- The Poems of Sidney West, trans.: Katherine M. Hedeen & Victor Rodríguez Nuñez, Salt Publishing, 2009
- Between Words: Juan Gelman Public Letter, trans.: Lisa Rose Bradford, CIAL, 2010
- Commentaries and Citations, trans.: Lisa Rose Bradford, Coimbra Editions, Poetry in Translation, 2011
- Nightingales again, trans.: J. S. Tennant, in MPT Review, Series 3 no. 11 Frontiers, 2011
- Com/positions, trans.: Lisa Rose Bradford, Coimbra Editions, Poetry in Translation, 2013

=== Published in Spanish ===
==== Poetry ====
- Violín y otras cuestiones, Buenos Aires, Gleizer, 1956.
- El juego en que andamos, Buenos Aires, Nueva Expresión, 1959.
- Velorio del solo, Buenos Aires, Nueva Expresión, 1961.
- Gotán (1956-1962), Buenos Aires, La Rosa Blindada, 1962. (Neuauflage 1996)
- Cólera Buey, La Habana, La Tertulia, 1965. (Neuauflage 1994)
- Los poemas de Sidney West, Buenos Aires, Galerna, 1969. (Neuauflage 1995)
- Fábulas, Buenos Aires, La Rosa Blindada, 1971.
- Relaciones, Buenos Aires, La Rosa Blindada, 1973.
- Hechos y Relaciones, Barcelona, Lumen, 1980.
- Si dulcemente, Barcelona, Lumen, 1980.
- Citas y Comentarios, Visor Madrid, 1982.
- Hacia el Sur, México, Marcha, 1982.
- Com/posiciones (1983-1984), Barcelona, Ediciones del Mall, 1986.
- Interrupciones I, Buenos Aires, Libros de Tierra Firme, 1986.
- Interrupciones II, Buenos Aires, Libros de Tierra Firme, 1988.
- Anunciaciones, Madrid, Visor, 1988.
- Carta a mi madre, Buenos Aires, Libros de Tierra Firme, 1989.
- Dibaxu, Buenos Aires, Seix Barral, 1994.
- Salarios del impío, Buenos Aires, Libros de Tierra Firme, 1993.
- Incompletamente, Buenos Aires, Seix Barral, 1997.
- Tantear la noche, Lanzarote, Fundación César Manrique, 2000.
- Valer la pena, Buenos Aires, Seix Barral, 2001.
- País que fue será, Buenos Aires, Seix Barral, 2004.
- Mundar, Buenos Aires, Seix Barral, 2007.
- De atrásalante en su porfía, Madrid, Visor, und Buenos Aires, Seix Barral, 2009
- El emperrado corazón amora, Barcelona, Tusquets und Buenos Aires, Seix Barral, 2011

==== Anthologies ====
- Poemas, Casa de las Américas, La Habana, 1960.
- Obra poética, Corregidor, Buenos Aires, 1975.
- Poesía, Casa de las Américas, La Habana, 1985.
- Antología poética, Vintén, Montevideo, (1993).
- Antología personal, Desde la Gente, Instituto Movilizador de Fondos Cooperativos, Buenos Aires, 1993.
- En abierta oscuridad, Siglo XXI, México, 1993.
- Antología poética, Espasa-Calpe, Buenos Aires, 1994.
- De palabra (1971-1987). Prefazione di Julio Cortázar, Visor, Madrid, 1994.
- Oficio Ardiente (2005), Patrimonio Nacional y la Universidad de Salamanca.
- Fulgor del aire (2007), LOM Ediciones, Santiago de Chile
- De palabra: Poesía III (1973-1989) (2008), Visor Libros, Madrid
- Bajo la lluvia ajena (2009), Seix Barral, Barcelona

==== Prose ====
- Prosa de prensa, Ediciones B, España, 1997
- Ni el flaco perdón de Dios/Hijos de desaparecidos (coautore con Mara La Madrid), Planeta, Buenos Aires, 1997
- Nueva prosa de prensa, Ediciones B Argentina, Buenos Aires, 1999
- Afghanistan/Iraq: el imperio empantanado, Buenos Aires, 2001
- Miradas, Seix Barral, Buenos Aires, 2005
- Escritos urgentes, Capital Intellectual, Buenos Aires, 2009
- Escritos urgentes II, Capital intellectual, Buenos Aires, 2010
- El ciempiés y la araña, ilustraciones de Eleonora Arroyo, Capital intellectual, México, 2011

=== Criticism of his works ===
- The Reasoning behind the Act of Striking a Spent Match / Hernán Fontanet, 2019.
- Juan Gelman y su tiempo: Historias, poemas y reflexiones / Hernán Fontanet, 2015.
- Gelman. Un poeta y su vida / Hernán Fontanet, 2015.
- Juan Gelman : esperanza, utopía y resistencia / Pablo Montanaro, 2006
- La escritura del duelo en la poesía de Juan Gelman / Geneviève Fabry, 2005
- El llamado de los desaparecidos : sobre la poesía de Juan Gelman / Edmundo Gómez Mango, 2004
- Juan Gelman y la nueva poesía hispanoamericana / Miguel Correa Mujica, 2001
- Juan Gelman : poesía de sombra de la memoria / Elena Tamargo Cordero, 2000
- Acercamientos a Juan Gelman / José Bru, 2000
- Palabra de Gelman : en entrevistas y notas periodísticas / Pablo Montanaro, 1998
- La poesía de Gelman: cuando surgen las palabras / Daniel Freidemberg, 1997
- Juan Gelman : las estrategias de la otredad : heteronimia, intertextualidad, traducción / María del Carmen Sillato, 1996
- Como temblor del aire : la poesía de Juan Gelman, ensayos críticos / Lilián Uribe, 1995
- Juan Gelman : contra las fabulaciones del mundo / Miguel Dalmaroni, 1993
- Conversaciones con Juan Gelman : contraderrota, Montoneros y la revolución perdida / Roberto Mero, 1987
- La poesía de Juan Gelman o la ternura desatada / Hugo Achugar, 1985
- Juan Gelman, poeta argentino / Beatriz Varela de Rozas, 2004

== Documentary ==
- The finding of Gelman's disappeared granddaughter is portrayed in Jorge Batlle: entre el cielo y el infierno, a 2024 documentary directed by Federico Lemos.

== See also ==
- Argentine literature
- Dirty War
