= Hugo Campos Hermida =

Uruguayan police officer

Hugo Campos Hermida (September 27, 1928 – November 24, 2001) was a Uruguayan police officer.

== Background ==
Hermida also received training in the United States, including from the Drug Enforcement Administration.

== Significant roles ==
He has been accused with other Uruguayans in participating in the Argentine detention center Automotores Orletti, a clandestine holding area during the "Dirty War" in Argentina which was also used in the frame of Operation Condor. According to a document published by La República newspaper, Campos Hermida was responsible for Senator Zelmar Michelini and deputy Héctor Gutiérrez's deaths in 1976 in Buenos Aires. The Argentine poet Juan Gelman also denounced him in his complaint before the Spanish justice for the "disappearance" of his daughter-in-law in Uruguay.

Repeated extradition requests from the Argentine government remained futile. The Uruguayan government provided amnesty in 1986 to military and police personnel who violated human rights during the previous military regimes.

Campos also participated in the capture of the founder of the Tupamaros, Raúl Sendic, on August 31, 1972, as well as on the events of 14 April 1972 during which current senator Eleuterio Fernández Huidobro was detained while the Martinera couple was killed in the Amazonas street in Montevideo.

== See also ==
- Politics of Uruguay
