= Benito Medero =

Uruguayan politician (1922–2007)

Benito Medero Sorhuet

Personal details
- Born: December 17, 1922; Flores, Uruguay
- Died: February 14, 2007
- Political party: National Party

Benito Medero (December 17, 1922 – February 14, 2007) was a Uruguayan politician.

== Background ==
He was a 5th generation cattle rancher in Flores.

He served as the department's intendant and as a council member. In 1967 he was elected for the Uruguayan Parliament.

== Agricultural activities ==
In the 1950s he joined Alberto Gallinal, Carlos Frick and Carlos Pereira Iraola in the creation of the Sociedad de Praderas, an honorary association whose objective was to improve the productivity of Uruguay's natural grassland.

In the 1960s with the support of the World Bank he created and directed the Plan Agropecuario with the objective of improving the productivity of Uruguay's natural pastures using New Zealand technology. The program was very successful until 1972 when the UK joined the EEC and stopped buying Uruguayan beef, which caused prices to fall and the cost of new technology become unprofitable.

From 1962 to 1964 he was the president of the Uruguayan Rural Association.

== Minister of Agriculture under President Bordaberry ==
In 1972 he was designated Minister of Agriculture for the President Juan María Bordaberry, himself a rancher.

== Death and legacy ==
Medero died in 2007; he received tribute as State Minister. His remains are buried at Trinidad Cemetery.

He is remembered mainly as a technocratic politician representing enduring agricultural interests.

== See also ==
- Politics of Uruguay
