= Liliam Kechichián =

Uruguayan politician

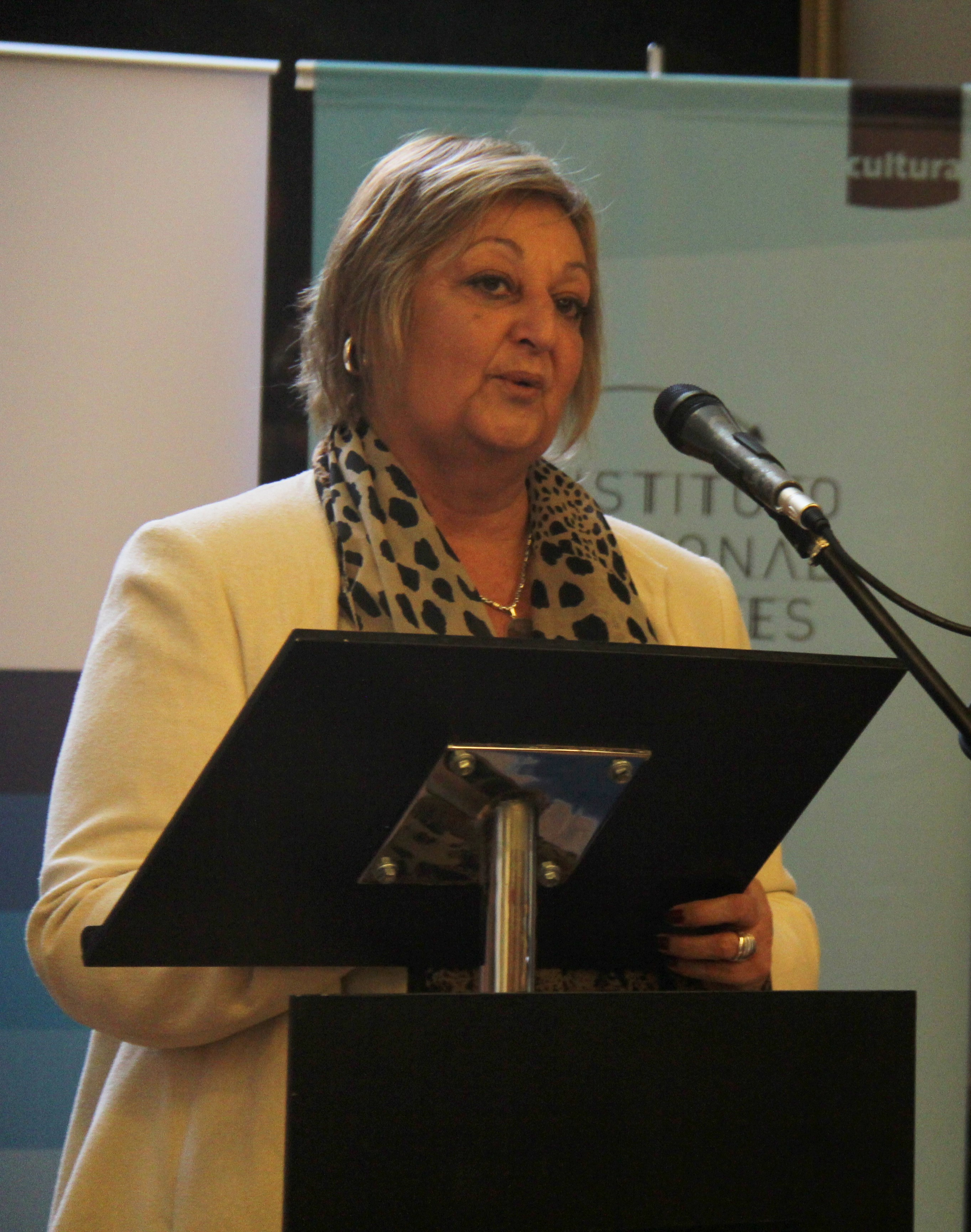
- Liliam Kechichián in 2016

Senator of Uruguay
- Incumbent
- Assumed office 30 June 2025
- Preceded by: Mario Bergara
- In office February 15, 2020 – 15 February 2025

Minister of Tourism of Uruguay
- In office May 30, 2012 – January 31, 2020
- President: José Mujica; Tabaré Vázquez
- Preceded by: Héctor Lescano
- Succeeded by: Germán Cardoso

Personal details
- Born: 2 March 1952 (age 74) Montevideo, Uruguay
- Party: Broad Front

Norma Liliam Kechichián García (born 2 March 1952) is a Uruguayan politician, serving as a Senator of the Republic since 2025. A member of the Progressive Alliance – Broad Front, she served as Minister of Tourism from 2012 to 2020.

== Early life ==
Kechichián was born in Montevideo in 1952, into a family of Armenian descent. Her father, a shoemaker, was born in Yozgat Province, in the Ottoman Empire, and later immigrated to Uruguay with his parents in the aftermath of the Armenian genocide, via Lebanon and Deir ez-Zor. Her mother was Uruguayan, originally from Sarandí del Yí, and of Spanish ancestry.

== Political offices ==
In 1999, she joined the Progressive Alliance sector. In 2004 she was elected to the Parliament Soon she was appointed Deputy Minister of Tourism, alongside Héctor Lescano. In May 2012 she was appointed Minister of Tourism, thus serving in the Administrations of both Presidents Tabaré Vázquez and José Mujica.

== See also ==
- Broad Front (Uruguay)#Ideology
