= Radio Rural =

Radio Rural (CX4)
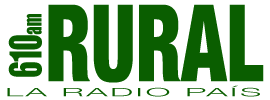
- Montevideo; Uruguay
- Frequency: 610 AM

Programming
- Format: Talk
- Affiliations: ANDEBU

Technical information
- Power: 50 kW

Links
- Website: radiorural.uy

CX 4 Radio Rural is a Uruguayan Spanish-language AM radio station that broadcasts from Montevideo.

== History ==
Founded by Domingo Bordaberry, who was lawyer and landowner, the programs of this radio have always been devoted to livestock and agriculture.

Some of its most notable media personalities made history in Uruguay:

- Benito Nardone
- Eduardo J. Corso
