= Domingo Bordaberry =

Uruguayan lawyer and political figure

Domingo Bordaberry Elizondo (1889–1952), sometimes credited as Domingo Borda Berry, was a Uruguayan lawyer who served as a Senator in the country's legislature. His son, Juan María Bordaberry became President of Uruguay in 1972 and his grandson Pedro was also a government minister.

== Early life and education ==
Bordaberry was born in 1889. He was the son of Santiago Bordaberry Sr, a Frenchman from the Northern Basque Country.

== Career ==
Bordaberry was a lawyer who later became a farm manager and large landowner.

He was also the President of the Asociación Rural del Uruguay. In 1925, he gave an address in front of the country's president and the visiting Prince of Wales.

Bordaberry served as a Senator for the Colorado Party. He was regarded as one of its more conservative members. Bordaberry was considered to be an expert on livestock matters and also acted somewhat as a bridge to the National Party, strongly identifying with the party's policies, a leading party member Benito Nardone, and the defence of rural interests. He was particularly linked with the 'riverista' current of opinion within the Colorado Party (Uruguay), although his record for political cooperation reached much beyond that party. With Nardone, he was also heavily involved in the development of radio broadcasting for rural Uruguay, as co-owner of CX 4 Radio Rural.

== Personal life and death ==
Bordaberry's son Juan María Bordaberry served with him in a prominent ruralist organization and later became President of Uruguay in 1972. His grandson, Pedro Bordaberry was a minister in the government of Jorge Batlle. Another grandson, Santiago Bordaberry, was also a prominent rural leader.

Bordaberry died in 1952.

== Political legacy ==
In contrast to much Montevideo-based political life, Bordaberry succeeded by bridging the gap between the opposing National (Blanco) and Colorado parties. His son Juan María Bordaberry and his grandson Pedro Bordaberry displayed similar penchants for drawing support from diverse parts of the Uruguayan political spectrum. This helped bolster the reach of Colorado Party. It was particularly relevant in the second round of recent Presidential elections, between the National and Colorado Parties, which was made more acute by the increased electoral support for the Frente Amplio party.

== See also ==
- Politics of Uruguay
- List of political families#Uruguay
- Colorado Party (Uruguay)#Post 2004: defeat at polls and rise of Pedro Bordaberry
- Pedro Bordaberry#Riverista resurgence
- Benito Nardone#Ruralist involvement with the Bordaberrys
