= Zelmar Michelini =

Uruguayan reporter and politician

- Born: 20 May 1924; Montevideo, Uruguay
- Died: 20 May 1976 (aged 52); Buenos Aires, Argentina
- Cause of death: Gunshot
- Occupations: Reporter, politician
- Political party: Broad Front
- Spouse: Elisa Delle Piane
- Children: Elisa, Margarita, Luis Pedro, Isabel, Zelmar, Cecilia, Rafael, Felipe, Graciela, Marcos

Zelmar Raúl Michelini Guarch (20 May 1924 – 20 May 1976) was a Uruguayan reporter and politician, assassinated in Buenos Aires in 1976 as part of Operation Condor.

== Career ==
Zelmar Michelini was member of the Chamber of Deputies from 1954 to 1958, and then of the Chamber of Senators starting in 1966. He was Minister of the Industry under Oscar Gestido's presidency (Colorado Party), before renouncing in 1970 due to disagreements with the government's policies. At that time, he left the conservative Colorado Party to participate, alongside other left-wing parties (Communist and Socialist Party and other independent left-wing groups), in the foundation of the Frente Amplio ("Broad Front") coalition in 1971. A reporter at the newspaper Acción, he also founded in the 1960s the weekly Hechos. Michelini again became senator in 1971, as a member of the Frente Amplio. However, he had exiled himself to Buenos Aires after the 1973 coup and started denouncing the human rights violations committed by Bordaberry's dictatorship.

== Kidnapping and death ==
Michelini was abducted on 18 May 1976 by a paramilitary group. He was tortured and shot; his body was discovered on 21 May in an abandoned Torino sedan, at the corner of Perito Moreno and Dellepiane in Buenos Aires. Three other bodies were found in the car – Héctor Gutiérrez Ruiz, former Speaker of the Chamber of Deputies of Uruguay, and two Tupamaros militants, William Whitelaw and Rosario del Carmen Barredo, all of whom had also been tortured before they were killed.

Judge Roberto Timbal put former dictator Bordaberry and former Foreign Minister Juan Carlos Blanco Estradé under preventive detention on 16 November 2006, for having orchestrated the murders. Uruguayan police officer Hugo Campos has also been suspected of being responsible.

== See also ==
- Operation Condor
- List of Uruguayan political families
