= Héctor Gutiérrez Ruiz =

Uruguayan political figure

Héctor Gutiérrez Ruiz (1934, Montevideo – May 20, 1976, Buenos Aires) was a former President of the Chamber of Deputies of Uruguay who was assassinated in Operation Condor.

== Career ==
He served as a Uruguayan deputy, and was member of the National Party. He was President of the Chamber of Deputies at the time of the coup d'état in 1973, after which he exiled himself in Argentina.

=== Death and prosecution file ===
Héctor Gutiérrez was abducted on 18 May 1976 by a paramilitary group. He was tortured and shot; his body was discovered on 21 May in an abandoned Torino sedan, at the corner of Perito Moreno and Dellepiane in Buenos Aires. Three other bodies were found in the car – Zelmar Michelini, former senator, and two Tupamaros militants, William Whitelaw and Rosario del Carmen Barredo, all of whom had also been tortured before they were killed.

Judge Roberto Timbal put former dictator Juan María Bordaberry and former Foreign Minister Juan Carlos Blanco Estradé under preventive detention on 16 November 2006, for having orchestrated the murders. Uruguayan police officer Hugo Campos has also been suspected of being responsible.

== Personal life ==
He was married to Matilde Rodriguez Larreta and had five children: Marcos, Juan Pablo, Magdalena, Facundo and Mateo.
