= Ramón Artagaveytia =

Uruguayan businessman and shipwreck survivor

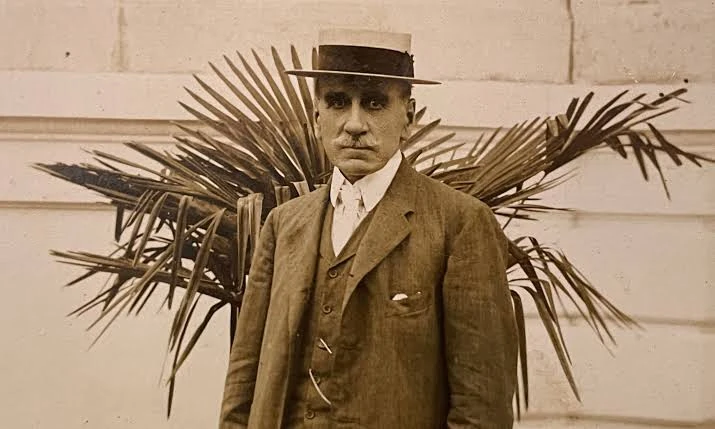
- Born: July 14, 1840; Montevideo, Uruguay
- Died: April 15, 1912 (aged 71); North Atlantic Ocean
- Burial place: Cemeterio Central, Montevideo, Uruguay
- Citizenship: Uruguay
- Known for: Passenger who died on RMS Titanic
- Parents: Ramon Fermin Artagaveytia (father); Maria Josefa Marcisa Gomez y Calvo (mother)

Ramón Artagaveytia (July 14, 1840 – April 15, 1912) was a Uruguayan businessman who survived the sinking of the America in 1871. 41 years later, he boarded the Titanic after visiting relatives in Europe and died when the ship sank after colliding with an iceberg, four days into its maiden voyage.

== Life ==
Artagaveytia was born in Montevideo, Uruguay, to Ramón Bernardo de Artagaveytía (1796–1852) and María Josefa Gómez (1806–1870). On Christmas Eve of 1871, Ramon boarded the S.S. America while it has harbored in Punta Espinillo, Uruguay. Newspapers reported that the America had been racing another ship into Montevideo harbour and high boiler pressures had led to a fire. There were 114 first class, 20 second class and 30 "popular" class passengers. Only 65 passengers survived. Ramon escaped by jumping into the sea and swimming for his life. Many of the passengers were horribly burned, and the event left Ramon emotionally scarred. He moved to Buenos Aires, Argentina, in 1905 to take control of a farm where he lived until 1912.

== RMS Titanic ==
41 years after the America incident, Artagaveytia traveled to Europe to visit his cousin who was the head of the Uruguayan Consulate in Berlin. He then boarded the RMS Titanic at Cherbourg on April 10, 1912, to visit the United States before returning to Argentina.

According to a survivor named Julian Padro y Manent, on the night of the sinking, Artagaveytia was observed with two other Uruguayan passengers, Francisco M. Carrau and his nephew, Jose Pedro Carrau; the three men were joking about the situation. Artagaveytia's body was discovered by the CS Mackay-Bennett. The following is the description of Ramon's body.

No.22

Sex- Male Estimated age 60. Hair grey, bald.

Clothing- blue overcoat, and blue suit, white dress waistcoat, black boots and purple socks. Two vests marked "R.A." and pink drawers also marked "R.A."

Effects- Watch, chain and medals with name on;keys, comb, knife, eyeglass case. 27:0:0 in gold, $20 gold piece and $64 in notes

1st Class.

Name,Ramon Artagaeytia

After Artagaveytia's body was recovered, he was transported to Argentina and buried on April 18, 1912. A letter he wrote to his brother Adolfo and his gold Swiss pocket watch were sold at auction for around $15,000 and $25,000.
