= Pagolle =

Pagolle Pagola (Basque)
- Commune
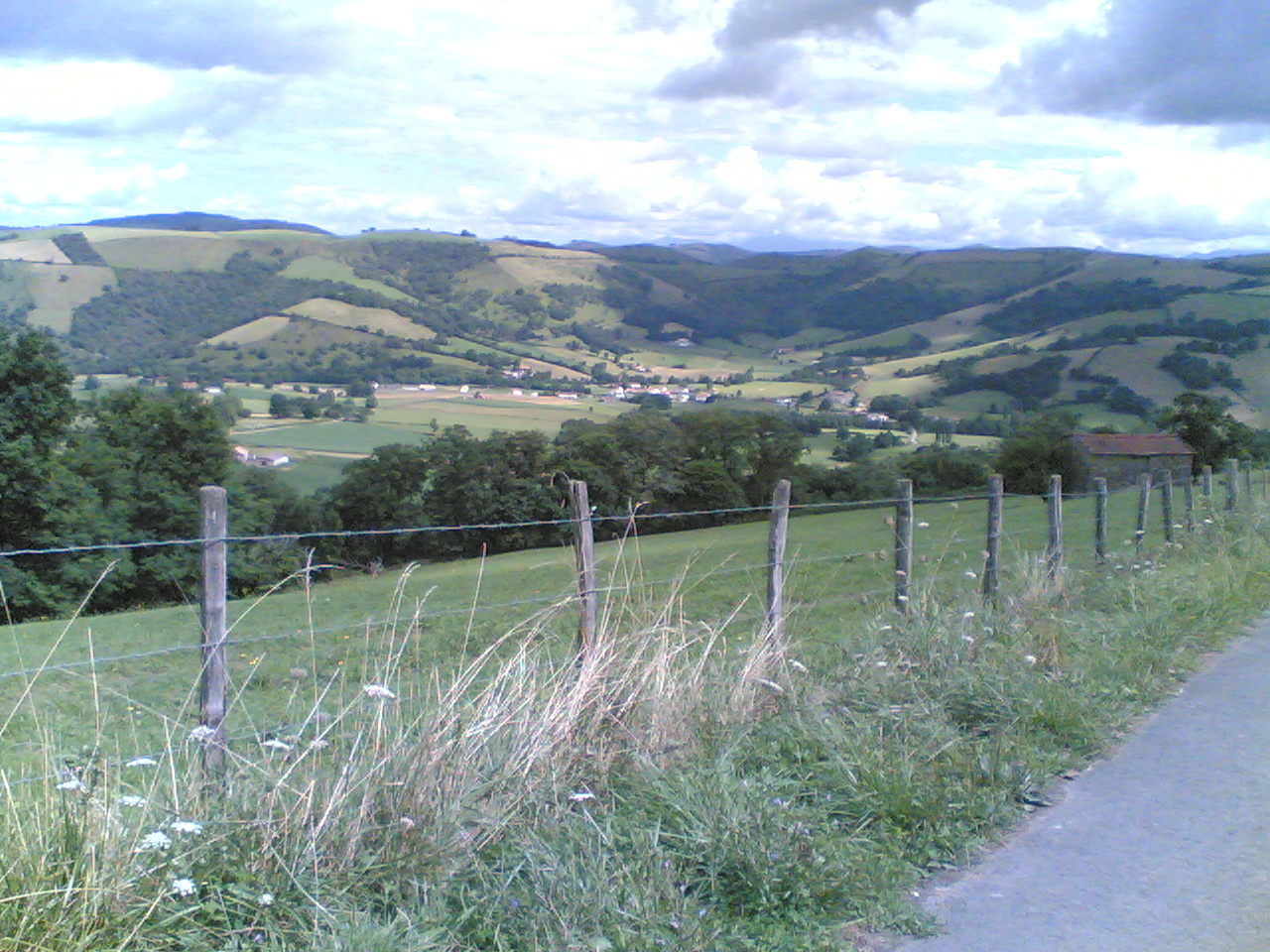
- A general view of Pagolle
- Location of Pagolle
- Location within France Location within Nouvelle-Aquitaine
- Coordinates: 43°13′31″N 0°59′21″W
- Country: France
- Region: Nouvelle-Aquitaine
- Department: Pyrénées-Atlantiques
- Arrondissement: Bayonne
- Canton: Pays de Bidache, Amikuze et Ostibarre
- Intercommunality: CA Pays Basque

Government
  - Mayor (2020–2026): Pierre Etcheber
- Area^{1}: 15.90 km^{2} (6.14 sq mi)
- Elevation: 304 m (997 ft)
- Highest elevation: 642 m (2,106 ft)
- Lowest elevation: 130 m (430 ft)
- Population (2023): 246
  - Density: 15.5/km^{2} (40.1/sq mi)
- Time zone: UTC+01:00 (CET)
  - Summer (DST): UTC+02:00 (CEST)
- INSEE/Postal code: 64441 /64120
- ^{1} French Land Register data, which excludes lakes, ponds, glaciers > 1 km^{2} (0.386 sq mi or 247 acres) and river estuaries.

Pagolle (French pronunciation: [paɡɔl]; Occitan: Palha; Basque: Pagola) is a commune in the Pyrénées-Atlantiques department in south-western France.

It is located in the Northern Basque Country, partly in Lower Navarre and partly in Soule, two former provinces of France.

== See also ==
- Communes of the Pyrénées-Atlantiques department
