= Felipe Michelini =

Uruguayan lawyer, politician, and diplomat (1961–2020)

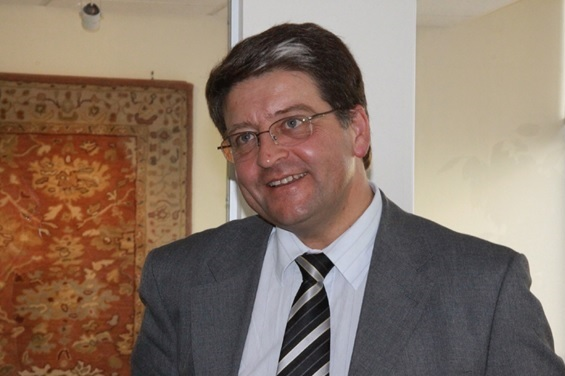
Photo of Felipe Michelini

Felipe Michelini Delle Piane (January 24, 1961 - April 19, 2020 in Montevideo) was an Uruguayan lawyer, politician and diplomat, who served in the Chamber of Representatives of Uruguay for the Nuevo Espacio party from 1995 till 2015. He was a member of the Board of Directors of the Trust Fund of the International Criminal Court from 2015 to 2020. He also served as vice-president on the Executive Board of UNESCO from 2005 to 2007.

== Bibliography ==
- Banfi Vique, Analía. (2012). Introducción al derecho internacional de protección de los derechos humanos (1. ed.). Montevideo, Uruguay: Fundación de Cultura Universitaria. ISBN 9789974208346.
