= Benito Nardone =

Uruguayan journalist & political figure (1906–1964)

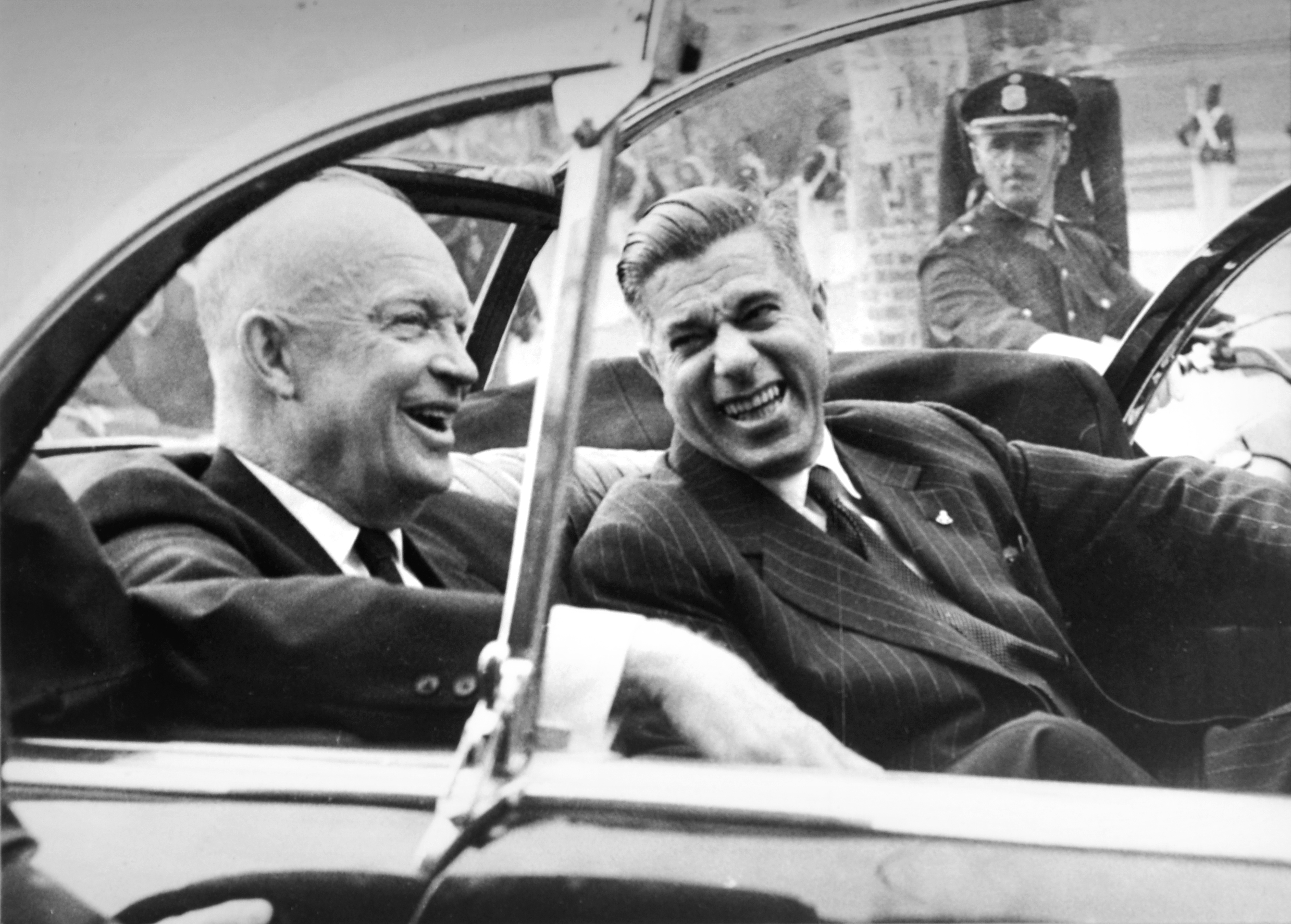
Benito Nardone (r.) with Dwight D. Eisenhower in 1960

Benito Nardone Cetrulo (November 22, 1906 – March 25, 1964) was a Uruguayan journalist and political figure.

== Biography ==
Nardone was born at Montevideo, the son of an Italian immigrant.

For many years he was a popular radio commentator at CX 4 Radio Rural. His political prominence came about after his long established reputation as a radio personality.

He was strongly identified with rural affairs. Prior to assuming the Presidency, he was seen as politically close to Domingo Bordaberry and his son Juan María Bordaberry, both of them heavily involved with a Ruralist affairs organization led by Nardone.

He was a prominent member of the Uruguayan National (Blanco) Party.

== President of the National Council of Government ==
In 1960 Nardone's Blanco Party colleague Martín Echegoyen stepped down as President of the National Council of Government, so Nardone succeeded Echegoyen as president, remaining in charge until 1961.

Nardone was himself succeeded as president by Eduardo Víctor Haedo, also a Blanco Party colleague.

== See also ==
- Politics of Uruguay

Political offices
Preceded by Martín Echegoyen	President of the Uruguayan National Council of Government; 1960 – 1961	Succeeded by Eduardo Víctor Haedo
