= Ministry of Tourism (Uruguay) =

Government ministry of Uruguay

- Ministerio de Turismo

Ministry overview
- Formed: 24 December 1986
- Jurisdiction: Government of Uruguay
- Headquarters: Montevideo
- Minister responsible: Pablo Menoni
- Deputy Minister responsible: Ana Claudia Caram
- Website: www.gub.uy/ministerio-turismo/

The Ministry of Tourism (Spanish: Ministerio de Turismo, MINTUR) of Uruguay is a ministry of the Government of Uruguay that is responsible for guiding, stimulating, promoting, regulating, researching and controlling tourism and activities and services directly related to it. It is also responsible for generating the conditions for Tourism to be accessible, planning the development of training and training in this economic activity, and promoting the development of infrastructure and accessibility conditions. This department of government promotes in the tourist activity the approaches of gender, ethnic-racial, sexual diversity, disability.

The Ministry is headquartered in the Rambla 25 De Agosto in Ciudad Vieja, Montevideo. The current Minister of Tourism is Pablo Menoni, who has held the position since March 1, 2025. Tourism is the second most important economic activity in the country, after livestock. The Ministry acts under the motto "Uruguay Natural".

== History ==
=== Creation ===
The Ministry of Tourism was created on December 24, 1986, in article No. 83 of Law No. 15,851, promulgated that day. It included the national tourism policy; the promotion of tourism industries; the regime, coordination and control of tourism; the promotion of tourism to the country and within it; tourist infrastructure, promotion, regime and registration of tourism service providers.

=== Historical evolution ===
In 1967, the Ministry of Transportation, Communications and Tourism was created, which absorbs the National Tourism Commission (created in 1933) and the National Tourism Directorate is established. In 1974 the regulation of tourism becomes the responsibility of the Ministry of Industry, Energy. On December 23 of that year, Law No. 14,335 was promulgated, where Tourism is declared as “an activity of public interest and as a factor of economic and social development” and the Executive Power is also obliged to establish and direct the national policy of tourism. After that legislation, the National Tourism Directorate became in control of the tourist activity, through a National Tourism Council.

In 1986, after the Civic-Military Dictatorship, by means of Law Nº 15.851 the Ministry of Tourism was created. In 2005 it was decided that tourism and sports affairs were under the charge of a single portfolio. Thus, with the Law Nº 17.866 of March 21, the Ministry of Tourism and Sports was created. In 2012, within the ministry, the National Directorate of Turimo was created, as well as the position of Director. Finally, in 2015, sport issues were separated from this portfolio. Thus, the National Sports Secretariat (Law Nº 19.331 of July 20, 2015) was created.

== List of ministers of tourism ==
Minister	Party	Began	Ended
Ministers of Tourism
Alfredo Silvera Lima	Colorado Party	1986	1987
José Villar Gómez	Colorado Party	1987	1994
Mario Amestoy	National Party	1994	1995
Benito Stern	Colorado Party	1995	2000
Alfonso Varela	Colorado Party	2000	2002
Pedro Bordaberry	Colorado Party	2002	2005
Ministers of Sports and Youth
Jaime Trobo	National Party	2000	2002
Leonardo Guzmán	Colorado Party	2002	2003
Pedro Bordaberry	Colorado Party	2003	2005
Ministers of Tourism and Sports
Héctor Lescano	Broad Front	2005	2012
Liliam Kechichián	Broad Front	2012	2014
Ministers of Tourism
Liliam Kechichián	Broad Front	2015	2020
Germán Cardoso	Colorado Party	2020	2021
Tabaré Viera	Colorado Party	2021	2024
Eduardo Sanguinetti	Colorado Party	2024	2025
Pablo Menoni	Broad Front	2025	Incumbent
Source			
