= Anarchism in Uruguay =

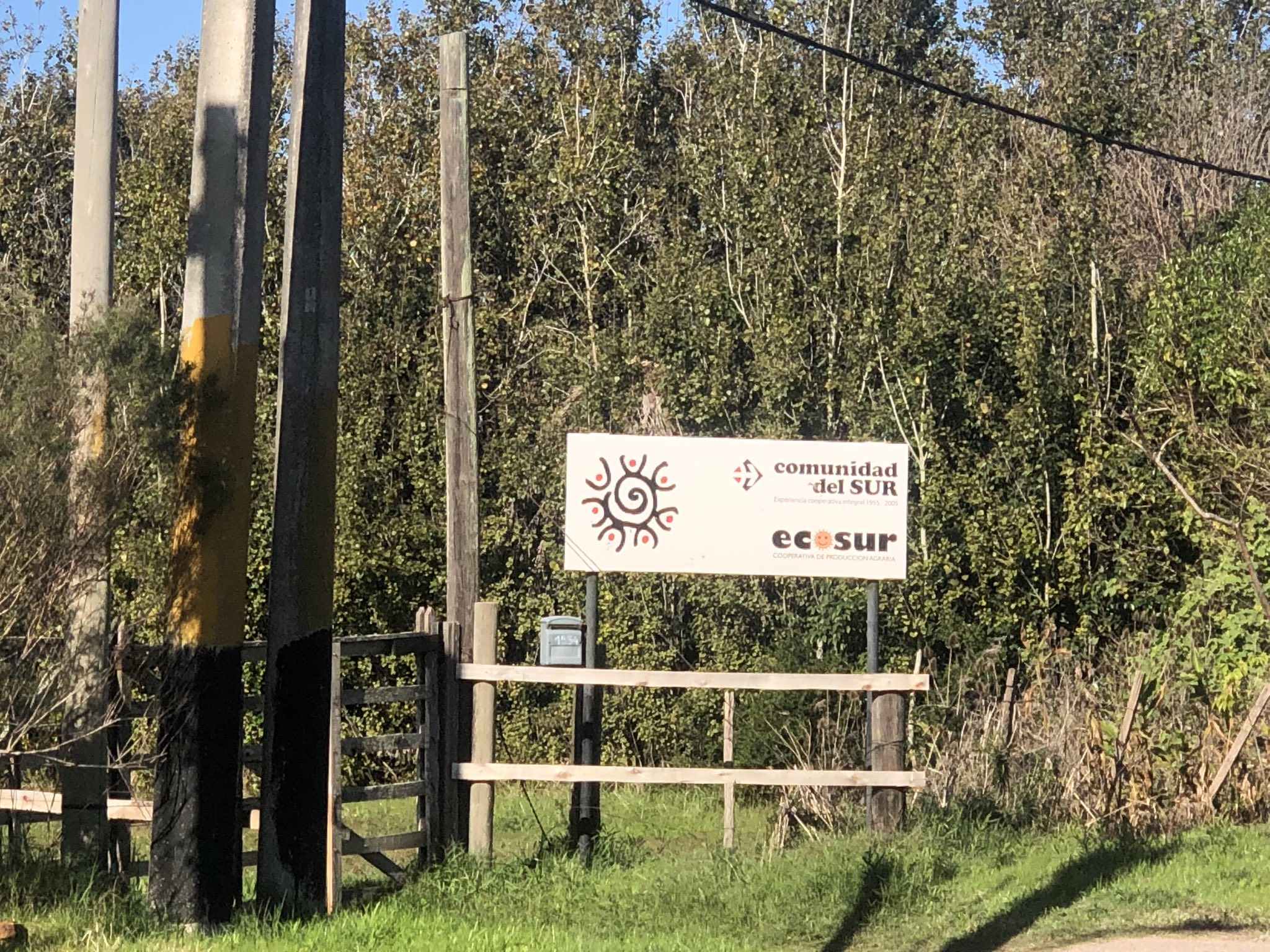
Entry of the Comunidad del Sur taken by companion 'Pouchka' (2025)

Anarchism in Uruguay held a major importance in the organization of the labor movement. The history of the libertarian movement in Uruguay is closely linked to issues circulating internationally: the immigration of Spanish and Italian workers in particular had a major influence in its development, but the relations between revolutionary movements across Latin America, and in particular with Argentina and Brazil are equally significant.

== History ==
=== 19th century ===
The predecessors of anarchism appeared as early as June 1841, in which author Marcelino Pareja published an anti-capitalist article in a Montevideo newspaper that cited William Godwin. Said article advocated for a pre-Marxist theory of surplus value. In 1851 the botanist and friend of Proudhon José Ernesto Gibert was exiled to Uruguay from France due to his participation in the revolution of 1848.

In 1872, the Uruguayan section of the First International was formed, with an office on Florida street, Montevideo. It ideologically aligned with the Jura Federation and in 1875 published a manifesto inspired by the writings of Mikhail Bakunin.

In 1875, the "Regional Federation of the Eastern Republic of Uruguay" was founded in Montevideo on the initiative of French and Spanish revolutionaries, exiled following the destruction of the Paris Commune and the Cantonal Revolution respectively. Influenced by Mikhail Bakunin, the Federation of Montevideo officially joined the Anti-authoritarian International at the first session of the Congress of Verviers in September 1877, although it had already participated in a correspondence with the International for more than a year.

In 1883, anarchists celebrated the anniversary of the Paris Commune on March 18 and collected 40 pesos to be delivered to prisoners in Lyon, France.

=== Early 20th century ===
In the first years of the 20th century, the Uruguayan proletariat strengthened its organization by founding the country's first trade unions. This movement led, in 1905, to the founding of the Uruguayan Regional Workers' Federation (Spanish: Federación Obrera Regional Uruguaya, FORU), based on the anarcho-syndicalist model of the FORA in Argentina. Many notable writers in this period flirted with the anarchist movement, such as Florencio Sánchez, Ernesto Herrera, Julio Herrera y Reissig, Leopoldo Lugones and Horacio Quiroga.

The FORU dominated the Uruguayan labor movement. By 1911 they had 90,000 members out of 117,000 industrial workers in Uruguay. There was also a small tendency of anarchists called the "anarcho-Batllists" who supported the President José Batlle y Ordóñez, owing to his support of trade unions. Virginia Bolten was a notable supporter of this while she lived in Uruguay. However, the FORU began to lose strength after the Russian Revolution in 1917, as the newly founded Communist Party of Uruguay divided the workers. But the FORU continued to be the strongest union in Uruguay until the early 1930s.

In 1929, Italian anarchist and friend of Errico Malatesta Luigi Fabbri and his daughter Luce Fabbri fled across Europe and eventually to Uruguay to escape fascist Italy. During the Spanish Civil War, Pedro Tufró (1904–1937) was executed by the communists for his membership in the Confederación Nacional del Trabajo (CNT).

=== Cold War and Comunidad del Sur ===
In 1947 Eugen Relgis arrived in Uruguay, having been persecuted by both the Nazis and communists.

In the 1950s a mixed community was established, Comunidad del Sur, made up of anarchists and anabaptist Christians. In 1956 the Uruguayan Anarchist Federation was founded in Montevideo, suffering a split in 1963 over whether or not to support the Cuban Revolution.

According to former CIA agent Philip Agee, the CIA station in Montevideo circa 1964 monitored the "small number of anarchists led by the Gatti brothers, Mauricio and Gerardo" but that they only merited "only occasional station coverage."

The FAU was declared illegal in 1968 and the Comunidad del Sur was dissolved by the Civic-military dictatorship of Uruguay (1973–1985). Former members of the Comunidad del Sur went into exile in Peru, Spain and Sweden. They came back after the end of the dictatorship and reestablished the Comunidad there, as an eco-community. Overall, the Comunidad del Sur impacted various orientations in Uruguayan feminism, ecologist and LGBTQI+ struggles.

Several Uruguayan anarchists were victims of Operation Condor in Argentina and Uruguay (1975–1983) such as Alberto Mechoso, Elena Quinteros, Lilián Celiberti and María Emilia Islas.

In 1986, the FAU was restored.

== Analysis ==
Ángel Cappelletti has argued that Uruguay had unique historical conditions that were receptive to anarchism. Notably citing high immigration and a more secular culture.

it is fair to say that in no other Latin American country were anarchist ideas more familiar to the man on the street, the educated public, politicians, and intellectuals than in Uruguay.

He also observed that the University of the Republic had the names "Proudhon" and "Reclus" engraved at the front of the university.

== See also ==
- Category:Uruguayan anarchists
- List of anarchist movements by region
- Anarchism in Paraguay
- Plenario Intersindical de Trabajadores – Convención Nacional de Trabajadores
- Tupamaros

== Bibliography ==
- Cappelletti, Angel J. (2018). "Uruguay". Anarchism in Latin America. Translated by Gabirel Palmer-Fernández. Edinburgh: AK Press. pp. 99–118. ISBN 9781849352826. OCLC 1044939183.
- Iglesias, Maite (2024), "El Archivo de la Comunidad del Sur", Historia y problemas del siglo XX, vol. 18, no. 1
- Iglesias Schol, Maite (2024), "«Amor libre», crianza colectiva y revolución: la Comunidad del Sur en los «largos sesenta» uruguayos", Contemporánea, 18: 113–128, doi:10.54344/contemporanea.v18i1.2475
- Zaidman, Pierre-Henri (2018). Anarcho-syndicalisme en Amérique du Sud: fin XIXe-début XXe siècles. Pages d’histoire. ISBN 978-2-9563704-0-6.
