= Partido por la Victoria del Pueblo =

Political party in Uruguay

Party for the Victory of the People Partido por la Victoria del Pueblo
- Abbreviation: PVP
- Founded: 26 July 1975
- Split from: Uruguayan Anarchist Federation
- Headquarters: Maldonado 1000 esq. Julio Herrera, Montevideo
- Newspaper: Compañero
- Ideology: Marxism; Anti-capitalism; Anti-authoritarianism; Historical: Anarcho-syndicalism (1975–1978); Guevarism (1978–1989); Marxism-Leninism (1978–1989)
- Political position: Far-left
- National affiliation: Broad Front
- Regional affiliation: São Paulo Forum
- Senate: 0 / 30
- Chamber of Deputies: 0 / 99
- Intendencias: 0 / 19
- Mayors: 0 / 112

Website
- www.pvp.org.uy

The Party for the Victory of the People (Spanish: Partido por la Victoria del Pueblo; PVP) is a Uruguayan anti-capitalist political party. Founded by members of the Uruguayan Anarchist Federation (FAU) in the wake of the 1973 coup d'état, the party dedicated itself to resisting the country's civi-military dictatorship. It was subjected to extreme political repression under Operation Condor, with many of its members being tortured, killed and disappeared from 1976 to 1978. After the transition to democracy, the party joined the Broad Front and participated in the country's elections, while the families of its disappeared members sought justice against the officers of the dictatorship. It held one seat in the Chamber of Deputies during the presidencies of José Mujica and Tabaré Vázquez.

== Establishment ==
In the wake of the 1973 coup d'état, many Uruguayan activists fled the political repression of the civi-military dictatorship into exile. Some sought asylum in neighboring Argentina, where they secured refugee status from the United Nations High Commissioner for Refugees (UNHCR).

In November 1974, the anarchists of the Uruguayan Anarchist Federation (FAU) merged with two Marxist groups affiliated with the Tupamaros. The FAU then began a clandestine process to restructure the organisation. For eight months, more than 300 members (90% of its total membership) met in secret every four days to deliberate the issue. The process culminated in July 1975, with a 10-day congress in Buenos Aires, during which 48 members met to finalise the diberations.

By the following month, the exiled anarchists had concluded their decision to reorganise into the Party for the Victory of the People (Spanish: Partido por la Victoria del Pueblo; PVP). The new organization intended to organize resistance to the civic-military dictatorship, with the aim of overthrowing it and returning Uruguay to democracy. Its ideology was rooted in anarcho-syndicalism and neo-Marxism. Among its co-founders were Sara Méndez, Mario Julién, Victoria Grisonas, Gustavo Insaurralde, and Gerardo Gatti, who became the party's first general secretary.

== Repression ==
The PVP quickly became a target for the dictatorship, which joined the nascent Operation Condor. Following the 1976 Argentine coup d'état, the Uruguayan dictatorship began carrying out enforced disappearances against exiled left-wing activists in Argentina. Over the subsequent two years, dozens of exiled members of the PVP were abducted in Buenos Aires. Others disappeared into one of Argentina's clandestine detention centres, including Automotores Orletti, El Club Atlético, Pozo de Banfield and Pozo de Quilmes. The PVP was also repressed in Uruguay itself, with 50 members being detained and tortured in 1976. PVP member Elena Quinteros was detained in Montevideo on 24 June 1976, but managed to escape into the Venezuelan Embassy and request asylum. Uruguayan military officers stormed the embassy and abducted her by force; she disappeared on 28 June.

=== First wave (June–July 1976) ===
On 28 March 1976, Elida Álvarez, Luis Ferreira and Ricardo Gil Iribarne were arrested in Colonia while transporting anti-regime propaganda. Over the following months, the activists were interrogated by the Uruguayan Naval Fusiliers Corps, through which the dictatorship first learned about the PVP. In June 1976, the first wave of abductions started, with a joint operation by Argentine and Uruguayan officers against the PVP. On 9 June, Gerardo Gatti and his secretary Pilar Nores were abducted from his home in Núñez and taken to Automotores Orletti. The trade unionist Washington Pérez was brought in to act as an intermediary, attempting to negotiate the release of Gatti and León Duarte in exchange for $2 million possessed by the PVP. Frustrated by the slow pace of the negotiations, the prison officers threatened to kill the PVP activists. After Gatti was "liquidated", Duarte advised Pérez to flee Argentina; he sought UNHCR protection and left with his family soon after. On 13 July 1976, PVP co-founder Sara Méndez was abducted from her home in Belgrano, Buenos Aires, separated from her son and taken to Automotores Orletti, where she was tortured by Uruguayan officers.

By mid-July 1976, the Argentine and Uruguayan authorities had kidnapped 39 PVP activists, who were secuestered in Automotores Orletti. There they were tortured, starved and deprived of medical treatment for their wounds. The detention and torture operation at Orletti was overseen by Aníbal Gordon, who had Argentines interrogate PVP activists for information on their money, as he distrusted the Uruguayan officers' intentions to share the money with them. Uruguayan officers, including José Nino Gavazzo and Manuel Cordero, did not hide their identities from the PVP activists and felt pride in what they were doing. Cordero attempted to reconstruct an organizational diagram of the party's membership, which he called "the bedsheet" (Spanish: La sabana).

In late-July, 25 of the PVP activists (including Sara Méndez) were taken from Orletti, clandestinely deported to Uruguay and transferred to the 300 Carlos prison; they reported significantly better conditions here, as they were properly fed, kept warm and allowed to shower. In August, they were transferred to the SID detention centre on Artigas Boulevard, where they were handcuffed, blindfolded and tortured. After five months of imprisonment, Méndez was permitted to see her family in the Punta de Rieles prison; there she discovered that her son Simón had disappeared.

Most of the other PVP activists in Orletti were killed or disappeared. On 26 July, a cable sent to the CIA affirmed that most detainees would be killed, and confirmed that Gatti and Duarte had already been murdered. Those PVP activists who were not captured lived in constant fear and paranoia, with one remarking that he thought he would be abducted every time her saw a Ford Falcon driving past.

=== Second wave (September–October 1976) ===
With Gatti and Duarte dead, Alberto Mechoso and Adalberto Soba took over the PVP leadership. Argentine and Uruguayan agents continued their efforts to find the party's money, which they hoped to seize in order to dismantle the PVP. In mid-September 1976, PVP member Carlos Goessens contacted the Uruguayan military, offering to act as a police informant and hand over the members of his cell, in exchange for his own life being spared. With Goessens' information, on 23 September, the Argentines and Uruguayans initiated a second wave of operations.

On 26 September, agents captured Mechoso and searched his house in Villa Lugano, where they found $1.5 million of PVP funds; his wife and two children were later detained in Sara Méndez's house. Soba was also arrested, his house in Haedo searched, and his wife and three children were detained along with two other PVP activists. Later that day, officers besieged the house of Mario Julién and Victoria Grisonas. Julién was captured and murdered, after trying to escape. Grisonas was beaten, arrested and taken to Orletti, where she was tortured. Their children were taken into custody by the officers, then taken to Chile and abandoned; they were later located by their family and reunited with their grandparents.

The following day, Argentine and Uruguayan officers abducted PVP activists María Islas and Jorge Zaffaroni, along with their infant daughter Mariana, from their home in Vicente López. The families of Mechoso and Soba were flown back to Uruguay, together with ruguayan agents carrying the PVP funds. Soba's wife Elena Laguna reported that she saw one of the agents stealing money from the PVP cash box. Beatriz Barboza and Francisco Peralta were also arrested and put on a flight back to Uruguay, where they were imprisoned in 300 Carlos, before being transferred to prisons in Punta de Rieles and Libertad respectively. On 4 October, Washington Queiro was the last PVP member to be detained.

By the end of the second wave on 5 October, 27 PVP members had been imprisoned in Orletti. Barboza and Peralta were two of the only PVP activists who survived the September abductions. The rest of the PVP activists disappeared; journalist Roger Rodríguez believes they were secretly flown to Uruguay and detained in 300 Carlos, where they were murdered. The funds taken from the PVP were split between the Argentine and Uruguayan agencies, the latter of which used their portion to purchase the premises for another secret prison.

To justify the reappearance of several PVP activists in the country, the Uruguayan authorities resolved to simulate a guerrilla invasion. On 23 October, agents posing as PVP militants were performatively arrested in Shangrilá. The authorities then announced in the press that they had detained 62 PVP members. In November, 14 of the repatriated PVP militants were prosecuted by a military tribunal and imprisoned in Punta de Rieles and Libertad. By December, all of the PVP detainees had been transferred. The repatriations were welcomed by the US ambassador to Uruguay, but the narrative of events was publicly challenged by the US ambassador to Argentina, who pointed out that several refugees were still missing. By this time, the United States government was aware that the PVP had been effectively dismantled, despite the official narrative of a guerrilla attack, and that it no longer threatened the Uruguayan dictatorship.

=== Third phase (1977-1978) ===
After the effective dismantling of the PVP in 1976, Gustavo Inzaurralde had taken over as party leader in South America. Operation Condor continued throughout 1977 and 1978, with Argentine, Chilean, Paraguayan and Uruguayan agencies pursuing PVP activists in exile. However, relations between the Argentine and Uruguayan agencies also deteriorated during this period, due to conflict over the appropriated PVP money. Brazilian agencies officially withdrew from Operation Condor, but continued working with the Uruguayans to detain PVP activists.

On 29 March 1977, Inzaurralde and Nelson Santana were arrested in Asunción while attempting to obtain fake passports so they could escape to Europe. Their interrogation by Uruguayan officers confirmed that Inzaurralde was the leader of the PVP at that time, but brought no more information to light. On 16 May, the prisoners were handed over by Paraguayan police to the Argentine military, who took them back to Buenos Aires for interrogation by Uruguayan agents. Inzaurralde was imprisoned in El Club Atlético, where he was last seen on 26 May 1977.

By the following year, Hugo Cores was the sole remaining member of the PVP central committee who had not been captured or killed, having himself fled into exile in France. There he oversaw the party's shift from anarchism towards Marxism–Leninism and Guevarism. Cores was a focus of a "third phase" of repressions, which targeted activists in exile in France.

On 2 November, 8 PVP members were arrested in Uruguay for distributing the party newspaper Compañero. Under torture, they revealed that the PVP activists Lilián Celiberti and Universindo Rodríguez were in the Brazilian city of Porto Alegre. The couple was Cores' contact in Brazil, where he planned to resume his activism against the dictatorship, having already moved his family there earlier that year. On 12 November, the Uruguayan and Brazilian authorities initiated a joint operation to capture Cores. Plain clothes police officers arrested Celiberti at a bus station, while Rodríguez and their children were detained outside their home. The whole family were taken back to Uruguay overnight, and then interrogated about the whereabouts of PVP activists in Brazil. The following day, Celiberti was brought back to Porto Alegre, where she told them about an upcoming meeting with Cores, in exchange for guarantees that her children would not be harmed. She called Cores in Paris to confirm their meeting at 17:00, alerting him to the situation using a code word.

On 17 November, Cores telephoned Brazilian journalist Luiz Cláudio Cunha, who he asked to check on Celiberti and Rodríguez. At 17:30, he and his photographer arrived at their apartment and were immediately pulled inside by armed police, who had assumed the journalists were with the PVP. They were quickly identified and released, with the police telling them they were trying to apprehend illegal immigrants. Cunha exposed the Uruguayan operation in the Brazilian media, which saved the lives of Celiberti and Rodríguez. Uruguayan exiles in Porto Alegre were on high alert after the operation, while the Uruguayan authorities attempted to justify the operation with claims of an illegal border crossing.

=== Investigations ===
During the investigation of Operation Condor by Amnesty International, Washington Pérez and Eduardo Dean Bermúdez were among those who testified about the repression of the PVP by the South American dictatorships. Uruguayan military officer Hugo García Rivas, who defected from the dictatorship in 1980, testified about the operation to apprehend Cores. Testimony about the imprisonment of Gatti and Duarte was also provided during the Trial of the Juntas in 1985. In 1991, the government of Luis Alberto Lacalle began to pay compensation to the families of some PVP members who had been disappeared.

In April 2006, Pablo Chargoñia presented a case on behalf of Adalberto Soba's family which resulted in the indictment of several military officers on charges of conspiracy and the illegal deprivation of liberty. In June 2007, relatives of PVP members who had been disappeared in Paraguay requested a criminal investigation into army officers from Argentina, Paraguay and Uruguay, including former Uruguayan dictator Gregorio Álvarez. By March 2009, 8 military officers had been sentenced to more than 20 years in prison for the murder of 28 PVP activists.

== Democratization ==
Following Uruguay's transition to democracy, Cores oversaw the PVP's move into electoral politics. They joined the Broad Front (FA). In 1989, the PVP co-founded the Movement of Popular Participation (MPP), a left-wing electoral coalition within the Broad Front (FA) led by former Tupamaros leader José Mujica. During the 1990s, feminist activists of the PVP who had co-founded the Cotidiano Mujer distanced themselves from the FA, although some, including Constanza Moreira, remained involved as part of its feminist caucus.

The Broad Front was divided by the 2009 Uruguayan referendum, with the PVP campaigning in favor, while others in the MPP opted to abstain. The referendum was ultimately rejected by a majority of voters, with observers citing the Broad Front's lack of a consistent position on it as a contributing factor. After Mujica took power, in October 2011, the PVP proposed a bill to lift obstacles to the punishment of human rights abuses under the dictatorship. It received the support of the Broad Front and was signed into law by the President. By the mid-2010s, the PVP made up between 2 and 3% of the Broad Front's membership, and in the 2014 Uruguayan general election, it gained 1 seat in the National Assembly.

== Bibliography ==
- Anria, Santiago; Pérez Bentancur, Verónica; Piñeiro Rodríguez, Rafael; Rosenblatt, Fernando (2021). "Agents of Representation: The Organic Connection between Society and Leftist Parties in Bolivia and Uruguay". Politics & Society. 50 (3): 384–412. doi:10.1177/00323292211042442. hdl:20.500.12008/40911.
- Araiza Kokinis, Troy Andreas (2020). "The Women of Casa Emma: Social Subversion and the Lives of Armed Anarchist Militants in Uruguay, 1967–1974". Social History. 53 (108): 305–326. doi:10.1353/his.2020.0015.
- Caetano, Gerardo (2009). Forcinito, Ana; Ordóñez, Fernando (eds.). "The Citizens' Testament and the Necessary Risks of Truth: Accounts Pending in Contemporary Uruguay". Hispanic Issues on Line. 4 (1). Translated by Beamish-Brown, Kristin: 85–136. hdl:11299/182575. ISSN 1931-8006.
- Heinz, Wolfgang S.; Frühling, Hugo (2021). Determinants of Gross Human Rights Violations by State and State-sponsored Actors in Brazil, Uruguay, Chile, and Argentina, 1960-1990. Brill. ISBN 9789004481800.
- Lessa, Francesca (2013). Memory and Transitional Justice in Argentina and Uruguay. Memory Politics and Transitional Justice. Palgrave Macmillan. doi:10.1057/9781137269393. ISBN 9781137269393.
- Lessa, Francesca (2022). The Condor Trials: Transnational Repression and Human Rights in South America. Yale University Press. ISBN 9780300254099.
- Lessa, Francesca; Balardini, Lorena (2024). "No Safe Haven: Operation Condor and Transnational Repression in South America". International Studies Quarterly. 68 (2). doi:10.1093/isq/sqae035.
- Pérez Bentancur, Verónica; Piñeiro, Rafael; Piñeiro Rodríguez, Rafael; Rosenblatt, Fernando (2020). "Voluntary Activism in the FA". How Party Activism Survives: Uruguay's Frente Amplio. Cambridge University Press. pp. 47–80. ISBN 978-1-108-48526-5.
- Touriño, Rosario (2011). "Uruguay: The Right to the Truth". NACLA Report on the Americas. 44 (3): 5–7. doi:10.1080/10714839.2011.11722150.
- Zoglin, Katie (2001). "Paraguay's Archive of Terror: International Cooperation and Operation Condor". The University of Miami Inter-American Law Review. 32 (1): 57–82. JSTOR 40176523.
