= Cotidiano Mujer (magazine) =

Uruguayan magazine

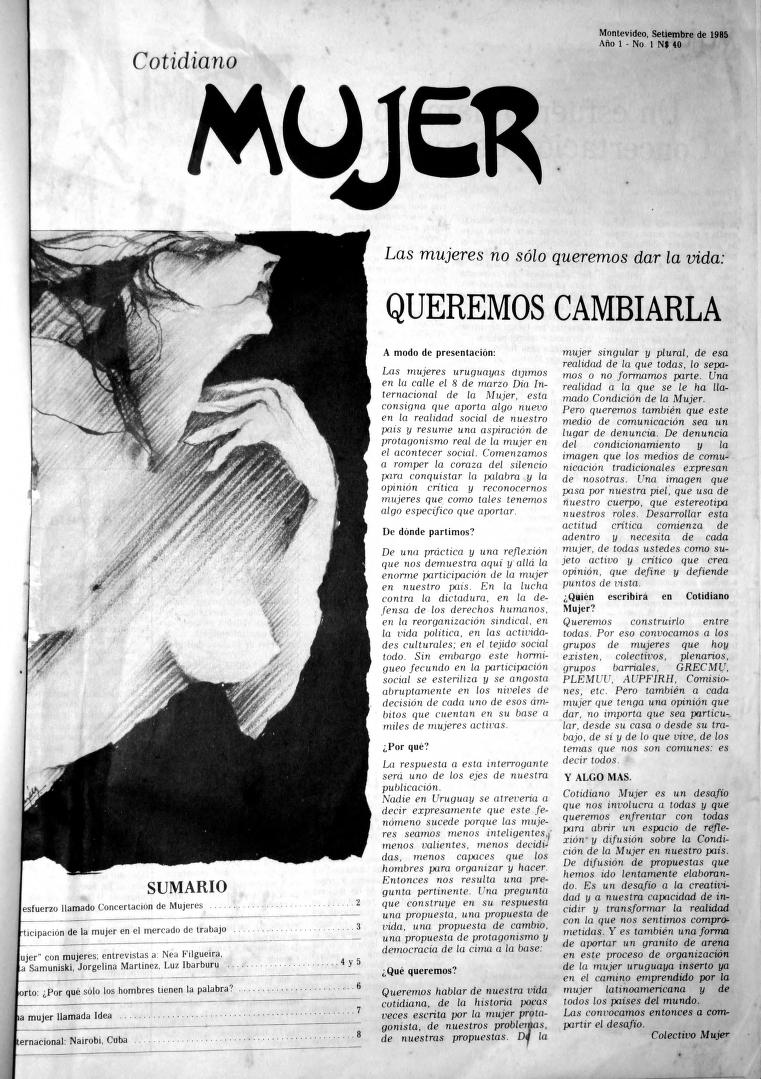
- First issue: September 1985; 39 years ago
- Final issue Number: March 2013; 12 years ago 63
- Company: Cotidiano Mujer
- Country: Uruguay
- Language: Spanish
- ISSN: 0797-3950

Cotidiano Mujer (Everyday Woman) was a Uruguayan magazine published by the feminist collective of the same name from 1985 to 2013. Its objectives were to discuss human rights and women's rights, and to give visibility to aspects of the daily lives of women.

== History ==
The magazine Cotidiano Mujer was founded by Lilián Celiberti, Elena Fonseca, and Anna María Colucci at the end of the civic-military dictatorship of Uruguay, when Celiberti was released from prison. At that time there was a political and social effervescence linked to the democratic transition which facilitated the public visibility of a second feminist wave that was emerging in the country. This new feminist agenda sought to advance beyond formal civil and political rights, to examine the problems of everyday life, such as the distribution of work and power within families.

In this environment, the magazine's first issue was published in September 1985, financed with an economic contribution by Colucci.

The magazine had five periods, covering the years between 1985 and 2013, with several interruptions. In its 63 issues, Cotidiano Mujer dealt with topics such as labor rights, sexual and reproductive rights, the decriminalization of abortion, the political participation of women, women in sports, sexual diversity (especially lesbianism), motherhood, racism, migration, and secularism.

The legalization of abortion in Uruguay was one of the main objectives of the organization and of the magazine, which began a campaign to this end in 1989. Another important focus of the magazine was questioning the image of women in traditional media. In this area, in 1997, with the support of UNICEF, a media monitoring program was carried out that produced more than 25,000 record cards on issues related to women and children.

== Team ==
Cotidiano Mujer's editors were Elvira Lutz, Lilián Abracinskas, Brenda Bogliaccini, Lilián Celiberti, Lucy Garrido, Ivonne Trías, Ana Danielli, and Elena Fonseca. Contributors included Telia Negrão, Cecilia Gordano, Luciana da Luz Silva, Jone Bengoetxea Epelde, Julia Zanetti, María Silvana Sciortino, Cecilia Olea, Virginia Vargas, Betânia Ávila, Ana Cristina González, Rafael Sanseviero, Paul Flores Arroyo, Teresa Lanza Monje, Carmen Silva, Alma Espino, Diana Maffía, Marta López, Marta Lamas, Alicia Miyares, Raquel Olea, Fanny Puyesky, Silvana Pissano, Margarita Percovich, Alejandra Sardá, Roxana Vásquez Sotelo, Ana Güezmes, Line Bareiro, Ana Falú, Verónica Pérez, Flor de María Meza, Constanza Moreira, Valeria España, and Lucía Pérez.

In 2016, the organization made the first issues available under a Creative Commons license, corresponding to its first period, published monthly between September 1985 (No. 1) and November 1989 (No. 33). In 2018, it digitized and made available copies from the second to the fourth periods. Added to issues from of the fifth period, which were already available, it finished digitizing the entire archive of the magazine for free access.

== See also ==
- Mujer y Salud en Uruguay
