= Ir (political party) =

Uruguayan political party

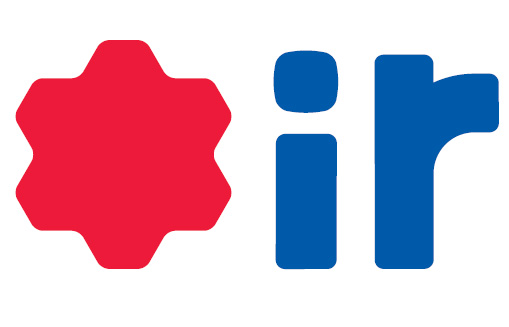
- Founded: 2010
- Headquarters: Montevideo
- Ideology: Democratic Socialism; Ecosocialism; Progressivism
- Political position: Left
- Parlasur Group: Progressive Group
- Parlasur: 0 / 18
- Deputies: 0 / 99
- Senators: 0 / 30
- Mayors: 0 / 19

Ir is a Uruguayan political group founded in 2010, a member of the Broad Front and the tripartite group called "El Abrazo" that it shares with two other sectors of the Broad Front: Plena Collective and Moving Front.

== History ==
After the departmental elections of 2010 in Uruguay, a group of more than one hundred Frente Amplista militants, coming from other sectors of the party and social movements, founded a new group in the Broad Front which they called Ir. Founding members of IR include Macarena Gelman, Alejandro Zavala and Martín Rebella. The reasons for which the group was formed included the purpose of achieving a generational renewal in the Broad Front, as well as the demand for a self-criticism of the Broad Front for the defeat in the constitutional plebiscite to annul the Expiration Law, and for the presidential veto of the Law on Sexual and Reproductive Health. In addition, the IR sought to contribute to the formation of more plural political practices and mechanisms within the Broad Front, promoting, among other measures, the election of the president of the Broad Front in an open election and the incorporation of new spaces and tools for participation.

In February 2012, a group of Frente Amplio leaders proposed Alejandro Zavala as a possible candidate for the Broad Front presidency. However, Zavala turned down the offer because he felt the Broad Front could not address the polarization issues of the time.

In October 2013, the IR announced its support for the presidential candidacy of Constanza Moreira for the 2014 internal elections. Likewise, in March 2014 it announced the candidacy of Macarena Gelman for deputy. In the internal elections of June 2014 it obtained 11,292 votes for the National Deliberative Body, being the ninth force of the Broad Front at the national level and the fifth in Montevideo. In the national elections of the 26 October 2014 the sector obtained a seat in the Cámara de Representantes for the department of Montevideo.

In the National Plenary of the Broad Front on 5 March 2016, the IR formally entered the political force, after obtaining a special majority of 4/5 of members without registering more than 10% votes against or abstentions. Although the group was affiliated with the Frente Amplio since its foundation and was already part of the party's bench in Parliament, the plenary decision is the requirement to officially participate in the structure and decision-making bodies.

At the end of 2018, after an internal vote, the IR decided to support the presidential candidate Daniel Martínez for the 2019 national elections.

Patricia González Viñoly, member of IR and, until early 2019, director of the Advisory for Gender Equality of the Intendencia de Montevideo, headed the list of candidates for the group during the 2019 elections. González Viñoly is also the general coordinator of Martínez's presidential campaign.

Facing the October 2019 parliamentary elections, IR was integrated with Magnolia, Frente en Movimiento and Colectivo Plena, presenting a list to the Senate headed by Patricia Kramer and Christian di Candia.

== Ideology ==
The IR is a left political force. In its founding document, it proclaims the search for a fair distribution of wealth, as well as the fight against all forms of discrimination.

The group's motto is "Left with a new meaning." To the classic aspirations of the political left, it adds new challenges such as caring for the environment, the gender perspective and respect for the diversity of life options.

Among its founding principles is the fight for the actual exercise of Human Rights. At the economic level, it points out among its principles sustainable development and support for the actors of the social economy. It also proposes a broad reform of the Constitution to discuss the country's institutions. It proposes the inclusion of more direct democracy mechanisms. It aspires to the democratization of the media and the socialization of knowledge. It raises the discussion for the need for an army in the country. At the international level, it favors regional integration within the framework of Mercosur and UNASUR.

In December 2017, the First Ir Ideological Congress concluded, whose resolutions were approved in February 2018. As a result of this process, the Ir declared itself feminist and created the Ir Feminist Front.
