= Luce Fabbri =

Italian writer and anarchist (1908–2000)

- Born: 25 July 1908; Rome, Italy
- Died: 19 August 2000 (aged 92); Montevideo, Uruguay
- Other name: Luz de Alba
- Occupations: Publisher, teacher

Luce Fabbri (pen name, Luz de Alba; 1908–2000) was an Italian-Uruguayan anarchist writer, publisher and teacher. The daughter of Luigi Fabbri, she wrote for anarchist publications from an early age. After studying literature at university, she fled Fascist Italy and joined her parents in exile, eventually making her way to Uruguay. There she witnessed the rapidly changing conditions of the period, began publishing her own journals and writing her own theories on anarchist revolution. She spent the rest of her life teaching at the University of the Republic.

== Biography ==
In 1908, Luce Fabbri was born in Rome, the daughter of Italian anarchist Luigi Fabbri. Herself also an anarchist from an early age, she wrote articles for Errico Malatesta's magazine Pensiero e Volontà. She studied literature at the University of Bologna, writing her dissertation on the work of French anarchist and geographer Élisée Reclus. In 1929, she fled Fascist Italy and reunited with her parents in Paris, where they had been living in exile. She went with them as they moved to Belgium and then on to Uruguay, finally settling in Montevideo. In 1933, Fabbri witnessed President Gabriel Terra's self-coup and the establishment of a dictatorship. She reported that Uruguay rapidly changed from a free country, to one where people lived under "the harassment of continuous surveillance".

In the Uruguayan capital, Fabbri published numerous journals of her own, including: Studi Sociali, edited by her father until his death in 1946; El Risurgimiento, which she edited during the Spanish Civil War; and Socialismo y Libertad, which she edited during World War II. In her writing, Fabbri developed an anarchist theory of revolution for the contemporary period; drawing from the work of Hannah Arendt and Albert Camus, she re-conceived revolution as a "flexible, contingent, and non-violent process", distinguishing it from the earlier anarchist theories of revolutionary spontaneity. She was also employed as a history and literature teacher, educating students at the University of the Republic from 1949 onwards.

Luce Fabbri died in Montevideo, in 2000.

== See also ==
- Anarchism in Uruguay

== Bibliography ==
- Ehrick, Christine (2005). The Shield of the Weak: Feminism and the State in Uruguay, 1903-1933. University of New Mexico Press. ISBN 9780826334688. LCCN 2005002484.
- Ferretti, Federico (July 2016). "Reading Reclus between Italy and South America: translations of geography and anarchism in the work of Luce and Luigi Fabbri". Journal of Historical Geography. 53: 75–85. doi:10.1016/j.jhg.2016.05.017. ISSN 0305-7488.
- Rago, Margareth (2015). "Luce Fabbri: Anarchism as an Art of Living". In Calcagno, Antonio (ed.). Contemporary Italian Political Philosophy. SUNY Press. pp. 99–118. ISBN 9781438458540. LCCN 2014047342.
- Ramonos, Eduardo (2010). "Fabbri, Luce (1908–2000)". In Ness, Immanuel (ed.). The International Encyclopedia of Revolution and Protest. p. 1. doi:10.1002/9781405198073.wbierp1684. ISBN 9781405198073.
