= Alberto Mechoso =

Uruguayan anarchist

Alberto Cecilio Mechoso Méndez
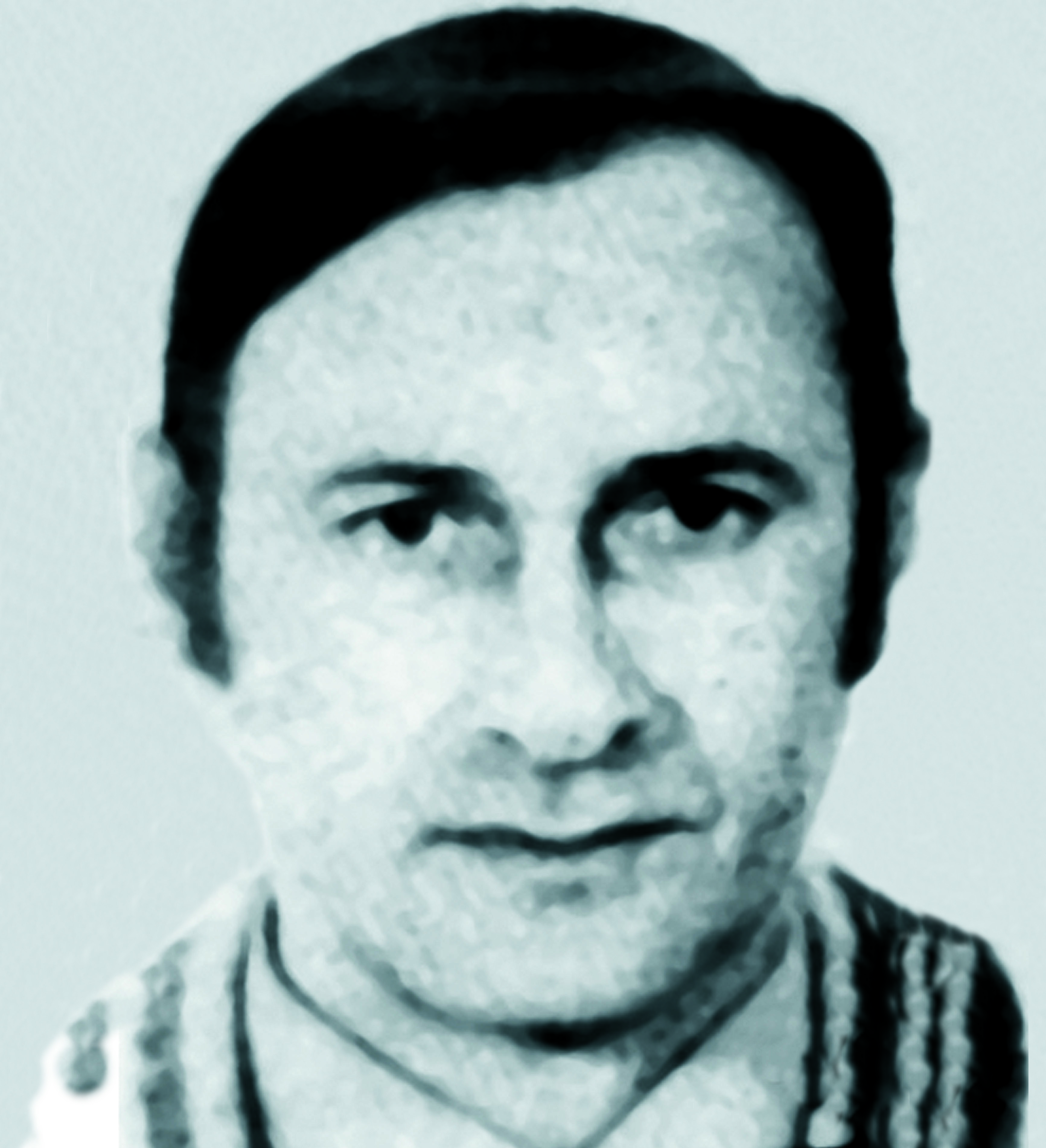
- Born: 1 November 1936; Flores, Uruguay
- Died: 26 September 1976 (aged 39); Buenos Aires, Argentine Republic
- Cause of death: Murdered by the Argentine and Uruguayan dictatorships (part of Operation Condor)
- Political party: People's Victory Party
- Other political affiliations: Uruguayan Anarchist Federation

Alberto Cecilio Mechoso Méndez (1 November 1936 – 26 September 1976) was an Uruguayan anarchist, who disappeared in Buenos Aires, Argentina during Operation Condor.

== Biography ==
=== Early life and political activities ===
Mechoso was born in the Flores Department. Later, his family moved to La Teja, Montevideo, where he became interested in politics. He joined the Uruguayan Anarchist Federation (FAU) and its armed wing the Popular Revolutionary Organization-33 (OPR 33). He was also a union member in the Federation of Meat Industry Workers and the National Workers' Convention. On 6 August 1972, Mechoso was arrested in a hotel and tortured in captivity. He escaped on 21 November and earned the nickname "grandpa" due to drastic weight loss and greying hair. He left Uruguay for Buenos Aires, using a fake identity to evade the police. In Argentina, he helped found the People's Victory Party (PVP) in 1975.

=== Disappearance ===
Mechoso was captured in a joint Argentine-Uruguayan operation in Buenos Aires after going out shopping in the morning with his son. He was tortured and his family threatened, while his house was raided for funding the PVP. Items in his home were smashed with pickaxes and flower pots. His family were deported back to Uruguay whilst he remained in Argentina. He was murdered, his body placed in a fuel drum with 7 other bodies, and the drum was filled with concrete and thrown into a river. The drum was later found in the San Fernando Canal near the mouth of the Luján River and the bodies were buried in the San Fernando municipal cemetery.

=== Recovery of body ===
In 1989, the bodies were exhumed by the Argentine Forensic Anthropology Team and in 2012 it was determined that one of the bodies was his. His remains were quickly returned to Uruguay to his family. A funeral was held and attended by President of Uruguay José Mujica.

== See also ==
- Anarchism in Uruguay
- Elena Quinteros
- María Emilia Islas
- National Reorganization Process
