= Elvira Lutz =

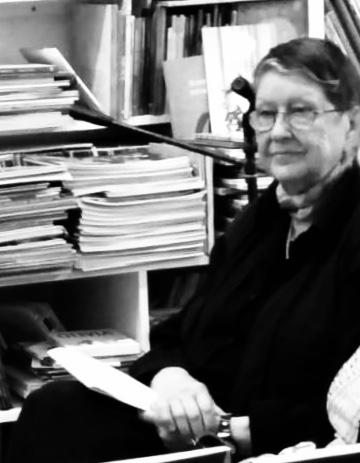
- Born: 2 December 1935 (age 90); Trinidad, Uruguay
- Education: University of the Republic
- Occupations: Midwife, writer, educator
- Spouse: Arnaldo Gomensoro (died 2013)

Elvira Lutz (born 2 December 1935) is a Uruguayan midwife, sex educator, and writer. A feminist activist, she has been an advocate for women's sexual and reproductive rights, and a member of the Advisory Council of the Latin American and Caribbean Women's Health Network (RSMLAC).

She has received recognition and tributes from organizations such as the Uruguayan Congress of Sexology (2010), the Organizing Commission of the Latin American and Caribbean Feminist Meeting (2017), and the Intendency of Montevideo (2019).

== Early life and education ==
Elvira Lutz was born in Trinidad, Uruguay on 2 December 1935. She studied teaching, and moved to Montevideo at age 20.

There I met Aurelia, an older midwife, who motivated me in training and activism in favor of women's rights. I listened to her, and I felt that it was a good idea, that it would help me clear up some doubts about my future. I studied with great sacrifice, because working, I was separated from the father of my first two children

— Elvira Lutz, in a 2012 interview with Brecha

She attended the University of the Republic's School of Midwifery, graduating in 1964.

== Career ==
Lutz began her professional career at the Ministry of Public Health's External Assistance Service and at Hospital Pereira Rossell in the 1960s. In 1968, she joined the Uruguayan Family Planning Association, where she worked on issues related to sex education, alongside her husband, psychologist Arnaldo Gomensoro, until 1992. She was editor of the association's bulletin, Ser Mujer (I Am Woman).

For two consecutive terms, from 1986 to 1990, she was elected permanent secretary of the Latin American Federation of Sexology Societies (FLASSES). In 2002, she was one of the founders of the Uruguayan branch of the Humanized Childbirth Network.

As an educator, she taught courses, seminars, and workshops on humanized childbirth and female sexuality, both nationally and internationally. Likewise, she provided consultancies in projects on family planning, quality of care, and sexual and reproductive health at women's NGOs and private institutions.

From 1985 to 1987, Lutz was the editor-in-chief of Cotidiano Mujer, contributing an article on abortion titled "Why do only men have the floor?" to its August 1985 issue. She is the author of numerous publications on women's rights and female sexuality. In 2018, she published the book Provocaciones de una parteraː pasado, presente y futuro (Provocations of a Midwifeː Past, Present and Future). In the epilogue, she wrote:

I have mainstreamed everything, because nothing is alien to me, from a feminist perspective. I was finding omissions, marginalization, discrimination in the disciplines in which I was trained – in obstetrics, in sexology, in sexual education – and I became an activist in the field of human rights and in the humanization of childbirth.

== Selected publications ==
- Gomensoro, Arnaldo; Lutz, Elvira (1982). El dilema sexual de los jóvenes [The Sexual Dilemma of Young People] (in Spanish). Montevideo: Banda Oriental. OCLC 253844132.
- Gomensoro, Arnaldo; Lutz, Elvira (1990). "La concepcion opcional: un encuadre antiterapeutico de los problemas sexuales" [The Optional Conception: An Antitherapeutic Framing of Sexual Problems]. Revista Latinoamericana de Sexología (in Spanish). Sociedad Colombiana de Sexologia. ISSN 0120-7458. OCLC 926660441.
- Lutz, Elvira (May 1993). "Women's Groups, Sexuality and Sexology Conferences". Reproductive Health Matters. 1 (1): 94–96. doi:10.1016/0968-8080(93)90067-4. ISSN 0968-8080. JSTOR 3774861. OCLC 5546627989.
- Gomensoro, Arnaldo; Güida, Carlos; Lutz, Elvira (1995). La nueva condición del varón: ¿renacimiento o reciclaje? [The New Male Condition: Rebirth or Recycling?] (in Spanish). Montevideo: Fin de Siglo. ISBN 9789974490611. OCLC 253035048.
- Gomensoro, Arnaldo; Lutz, Elvira; Corsino, Daniel (1999). "La crisis de modelo tradicional del varon y sus repercusiones" [The Crisis of the Traditional Model of the Male and its Repercussions]. Salud Problema (in Spanish). Mexico City: UAM Xochimilco: 97–111. OCLC 819903073.
- El largo Proceso de las Mujeres hacia la Autonomía [The Long Process of Women Towards Autonomy] (in Spanish). Saarbrücken: Editorial Académica Española. 2013. ISBN 9783659064395. OCLC 864079243.
