= José Nino Gavazzo =

Uruguayan army colonel (1939–2021)

- Born: José Nino Gavazzo Pereira; 2 October 1939; Montevideo, Uruguay
- Died: 26 June 2021 (aged 81); Montevideo, Uruguay
- Occupation: Army colonel

José Nino Gavazzo (2 October 1939 – 26 June 2021) was a Uruguayan army colonel. He was a member of the Servicio de Información y Defensa (SID). Gavazzo began his career as an artillery officer but became involved in intelligence and counter-insurgency operations from 1970 and was particularly prominent during the first part of Operation Condor. He was discharged from the army in 1978 after criticising the political ambitions of General Gregorio Conrado Álvarez. Gavazzo was convicted of extortion in 1995 and for the murder of 28 Uruguayans in 2009; he was facing further charges at the time of his death.

== Early life and career ==
Gavazzo was born on 2 October 1939 in Montevideo, Uruguay. His family was middle class and religious; his father was Italian in origin and had fought for Italy in the Second Italo-Ethiopian War. Gavozzo's mother died when he was young and on 1 March 1956 he joined the artillery section of the Uruguayan Army. In 1966 he was a captain and instructor at the military academy and in 1970 studied counter insurgency warfare in the United States.

== Repression campaigns ==
In 1971 he was promoted to major and served with the defence services intelligence branch, Servicio de Información y Defensa (SID), specialising in brutal anti-subversion campaigns, particularly from April 1972. From 1972 to 1973 he served with the 1st Division and from 1974 to 1975 with Artillery Group No. 1. In 1976 he became deputy head of the 3rd Department of the SID, based in Montevideo and Palmar and helped co-ordinate the kidnapping, torture and murder of members of the Partido por la Victoria del Pueblo.

Gavazzo was chief of the Uruguayan branch of Operation Condor and took part in the forced disappearance of the stepdaughter of Juan Gelman in Germany. Under the government of Tabaré Vázquez, he was convicted of the illegal transfer of people kidnapped in Argentina and detained in a clandestine detention center.

Gavazzo published a work "El Talero" that criticised the political ambitions of General Gregorio Conrado Álvarez. Álvarez had Gavazzo discharged from the military with the rank of lieutenant-colonel on 24 August 1978.

== Later life ==
In a case involving the counterfeiting of dollars, Gavazzo was convicted of extortion on 7 January 1995 and imprisoned. Gavazzo was immune from prosecution for his activities in the military by the Expiry Law but a campaign to prosecute him gathered pace from 1998. He was convicted in 2009 for crimes including the forced disappearance (murder) of 28 Uruguayan citizens forcibly returned from Argentina. He served his sentence under house arrest. José Nino Gavazzo died from a stroke in Montevideo on 26 June 2021 at the age of 81. At the time of his death he was facing additional charges relating to the 1973 murder of left-wing guerrilla Roberto Gomensoro, Gavazzo had admitted to a military tribunal that he threw Gomensoro's body into a river.
