= Elena Fonseca =

Uruguayan activist and radio journalist (1930–2024)

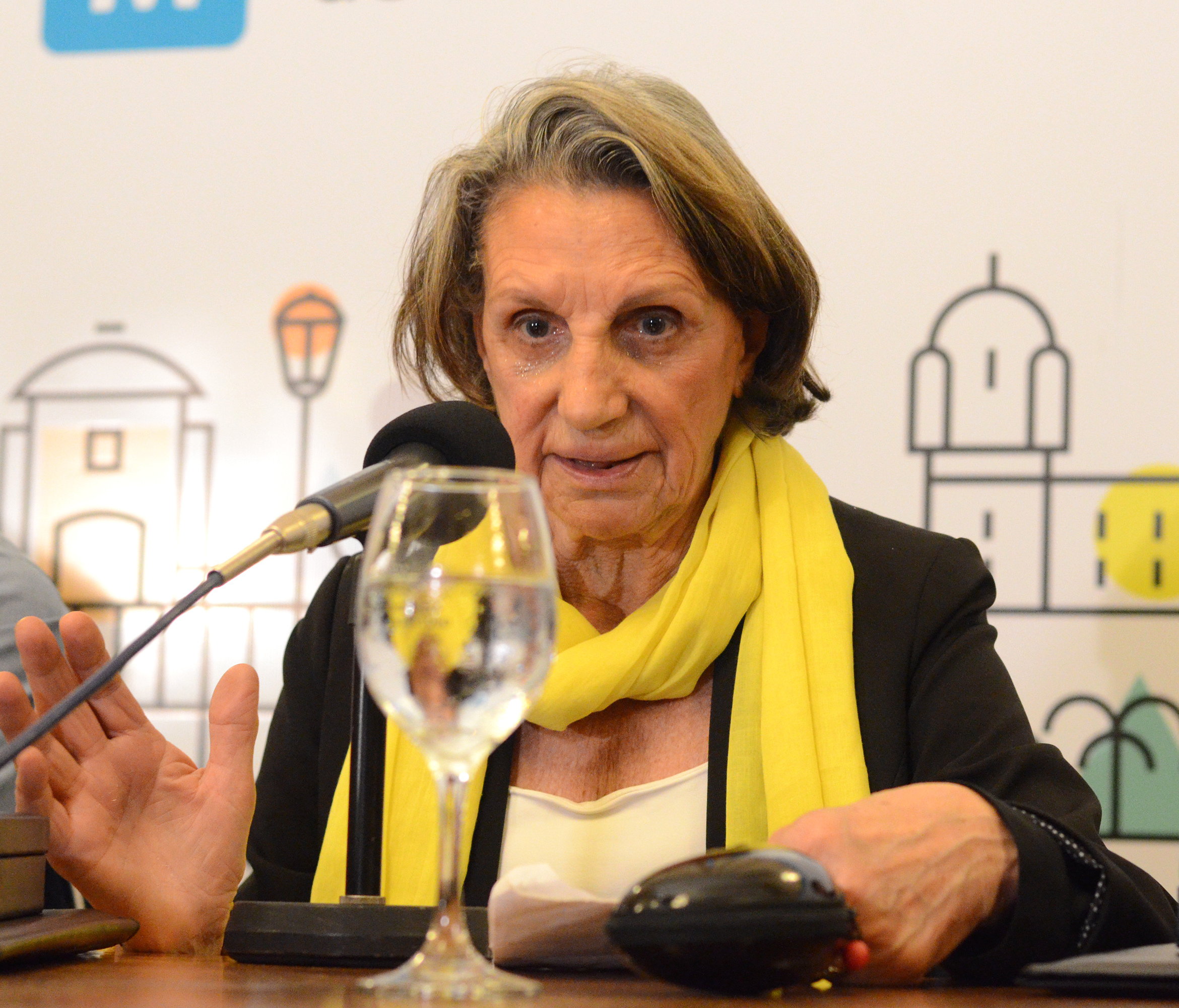
- Born: 1930; Montevideo, Uruguay
- Died: December 29, 2024 (aged 94); Maldonado, Uruguay
- Occupations: Activist, radio journalist, and writer

Elena Fonseca (1930 – December 29, 2024) was a Uruguayan activist, radio journalist, and writer focused on human rights, feminism, and old age. She was a co-founder of the feminist collective Cotidiano Mujer.

== Biography ==
Elena Fonseca was born in Montevideo in 1930.

Her husband was a diplomat, so she spent many years living abroad, including in Spain, Canada, and Switzerland. The couple had six children. She returned from abroad during Uruguay's dictatorship, finding it much changed from the country she knew.

At the end of the dictatorship, in 1985, she became a co-founder of the feminist organization Cotidiano Mujer, alongside Lilián Celiberti and Anna María Colucci, among others. From its first issue, she was part of the editorial team of the group's eponymous magazine.

For 18 years, every Monday through Friday, she hosted the hourlong radio program Nunca en domingo ("Never on Sunday") on Radio Universal (AM 970). It was the only feminist program on Uruguayan radio. In 2016, Nunca en domingo changed its format and continued as a podcast until 2021.

Fonseca produced the first Spanish translation of Simone Veil's seminal 1974 speech on abortion at the French National Assembly, in honor of the 20th anniversary of the legalization of abortion in France. The translation was published in Le Monde in 2004.

She was a co-author of a 2002 book on gender-based violence, Cosa juzgada: otra forma de ver la violencia de género, with Graciela Dufau Argibay.

In 2016, she was named an outstanding citizen by the Intendancy of Montevideo.

The activist, affectionately known as Elenota, died in 2024 in Maldonado, at age 94.
