= Lilián Celiberti =

Uruguayan teacher and feminist

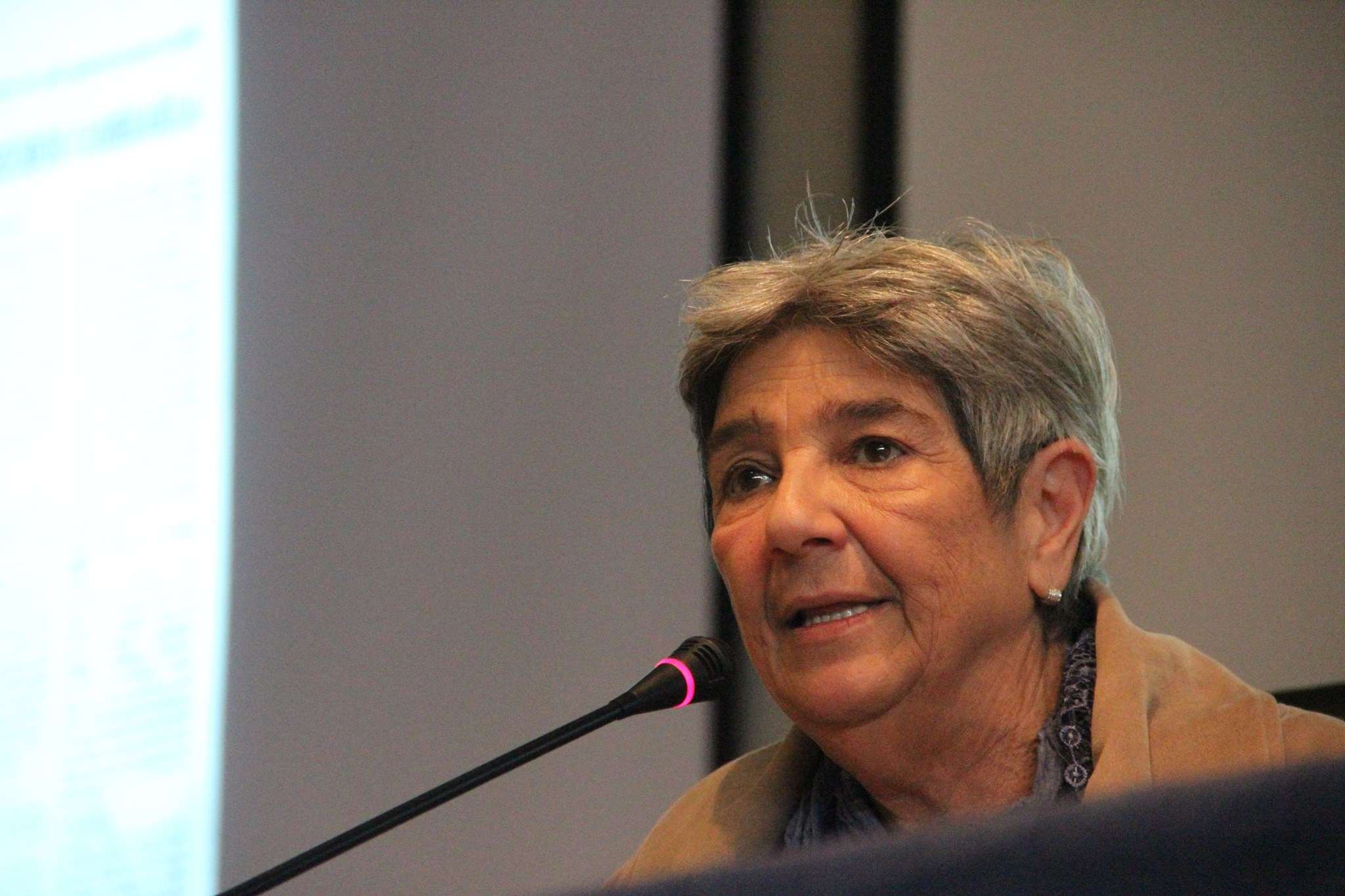
The Uruguayan feminist Lilián Celiberti speaks at the Encuentro de Feministas Desorganizadas in 2017.

Lilián Celiberti (born 1949) is a Uruguayan feminist activist. She became a political prisoner under the military dictatorship and lived in exile in Italy. She is a founding member and coordinator of the feminist collective Cotidiano Mujer, and she is also a leader in Articulación Feminista Marcosur, which promotes the development of a feminist political platform at the regional and global level.

== Early life ==
Lilián Celiberti was born in Montevideo, Uruguay, in 1949. She was the oldest daughter in her family. At age 16, she began studying to be a schoolteacher, which helped form her social outlook and motivated her later political activity. She joined a socio-pedagogical action group with her classmates, traveling to visit rural schools. In 1967, she was elected to the board of her student center, and the following years of frequent student agitation had a lasting impact on Celiberti's political and social trajectory. Many of her peers would later be disappeared under the dictatorship, including Elena Quinteros and Gustavo Insaurralde.

== First imprisonment and exile ==
By 1972, at 21 years old, Celiberti had joined the Uruguayan Anarchist Federation. While she was working as a teacher in a school in the Villa del Cerro neighborhood of Montevideo, she was detained by Uruguayan troops.

For two years, she was held prisoner in various places including the Punta de Rieles Prison, a military prison for women that held over 600 political prisoners over the course of the 12-year dictatorship. Her family managed to help arrange her release, and she was exiled to Italy—the terms of her release did not permit her to reside in any Latin American country.

It was in Italy that Celiberti became involved in the feminist movement; there was a large women's movement in Milan at the time that had just won the right to divorce and was campaigning for the right to abortion. Though she had experienced machismo sexism and witnessed horrific gender-based violence in Uruguay, in Italy she acquired the framework and strategies to begin combating these problems.

== Return to Latin America and kidnapping ==
In 1976, Celiberti joined the Uruguayan leftist Partido por la Victoria del Pueblo, which was founded in Buenos Aires the previous year. Frustrated with her inability to help her comrades in Uruguay who were being jailed or disappeared, she traveled to Brazil with her partner, Universindo Rodríguez, and their two children, Camilo and Francesca, to meet with fellow exiles.

On November 12, 1978, Celiberti was kidnapped by Uruguayan authorities along with Rodríguez and their children, who were 8 and 3 years old at the time. High-level officials in the Uruguayan military had traveled in secret with the consent of the Brazilian military dictatorship to where the couple was staying, in Porto Alegre, the capital of Brazil's Rio Grande do Sul state.

The kidnapping was widely denounced in the media thanks to a pair of Brazilian journalists who discovered the operation and exposed it in the magazine Veja. Because of the publicity, the abductees managed to avoid being killed—the only ones to avoid such a fate out of the nearly 200 Uruguayan dissidents who were kidnapped abroad in this period. Instead, their kidnapping became an international scandal, which was a problem for the Brazilian and Uruguayan military regimes.

The abductees were brought to Uruguay, where Celiberti and Rodríguez were separated from their children, who were sent to live with their grandparents. Celiberti and her partner were imprisoned for five years, during which time they were tortured and not allowed to see their children. She was held once again at Punta de Rieles.

Her testimony regarding this period of imprisonment is recorded in the book Mi habitación, mi celda ("My Room, My Cell"), which is based on interviews with the journalist Lucy Garrido.

== Release and aftermath ==
With the return of democracy to Uruguay in 1984, Celiberti and her partner were released. In 1991, through an initiative of governor Pedro Simon, the state of Rio Grande do Sul officially acknowledged the kidnapping and offered them compensation for its impact. The government of Uruguayan President Luis Alberto Lacalle did the same a year later. In 2024, the military officer Eduardo Ferro was sentenced to time in prison for his role in the kidnappings of Celiberti and Rodríguez.

Celiberti, along with other women such as Elena Fonseca and Anna Maria Coluzzi, created the feminist collective Cotidiano Mujer in 1985. She has continued to teach and organize feminist actions, and she has produced more than a dozen works on feminist subjects.

== Personal life ==
Though Celiberti and Rodríguez never married, they were lifelong partners and collaborators for over 40 years. He died in 2012, at age 61.

== Selected works ==
- Entre el techo de cristal y el piso pegajoso (editor, 2011)
- Puede y debe rendir más. Una mirada feminista a la formación docente en Uruguay. (editor, 2011)
- Diálogos Complejos: la mirada de las mujeres sobre el buen vivir. (editor, 2010)
- "El diálogo como práctica política" in: Diálogos Complejos: la mirada de las mujeres sobre el buen vivir (2010)
- Disputas democráticas : las mujeres en los espacios de representación política (co-authored with Niki Johanson, 2010)
- Participación feminista en el MERCOSUR: Desafíos y perspectivas de la Reunión Especializada de la mujer del Mercosur (2010)
