= Hugo Cores =

Uruguayan political activist and libertarian socialist

Hugo Cores (1937-2007) was an influential Uruguayan political activist, trade unionist and libertarian socialist.

He was born in Argentina and moved to Uruguay during his childhood. In 1969, he was appointed president of the Uruguayan Bank Employees Association, where he supported the creation of a single workers' union. In 1964, this union, the National Labor Confederation (CNT), was created, and he was subsequently elected vice president from 1969 to 1971. From June 27, 1973, he took part in the general strike against the military coup d'état and was interned in the concentration camp located at kilometer 13 of the Maldonado road.

He founded Partido por la Victoria del Pueblo in 1975, in exile in Buenos Aires, during the civic-military dictatorship of Uruguay. Within three years, almost all of the 100 people involved in founding the party were assassinated or “disappeared”, following the repression unleashed by the 1976 Argentine coup d'état. After being imprisoned, Cores escaped into exile in France and then Brazil, where he set about reorganizing the PVP, now a major source of information on human rights violations in Uruguay. In exile, Cores worked for the re-establishment of democratic rule in Uruguay.

Cores joined the Broad Front in 1984. After the dictatorship, President Tabaré Vázquez appointed Cores political secretary of the Broad Front. He served as political secretary from 1989 to 1993. He escaped an assassination attempt in 1991 when a bomb was placed in his car. Hugo Cores died of a heart attack at the age of 69 in Montevideo, in 2007.
