= María Ester Gatti =

Uruguayan activist (1918–2010)

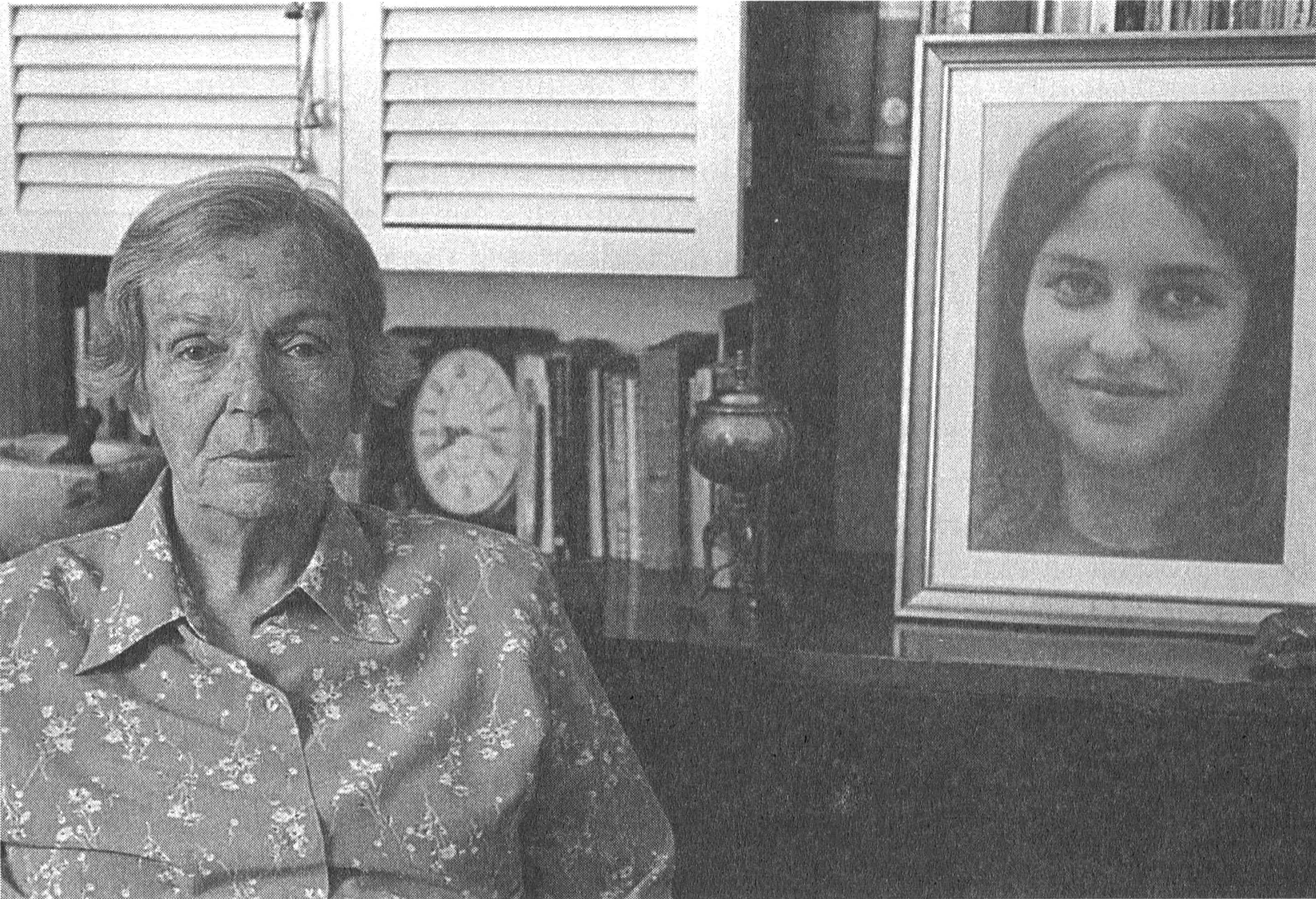
- Born: María Ester Gatti de Islas; January 13, 1918; Uruguay
- Died: December 5, 2010 (aged 92)
- Occupations: Teacher, activista
- Spouse: Ramón Islas
- Children: María Emilia Islas

María Ester Gatti de Islas (January 13, 1918 – December 5, 2010) was a Uruguayan teacher and human rights activist.

== Biography ==
She founded Madres y Familiares de Detenidos Desaparecidos, (or Uruguayan Mothers and Families of Disappeared Prisoners) following the abduction and disappearance of her daughter, son-in-law and granddaughter during the Dirty War in neighboring Argentina in 1976.

She died on December 5, 2010, aged 92. Her remains are buried at Cementerio del Buceo, Montevideo.
