= Comunidad del Sur =

Uruguayan eco-community

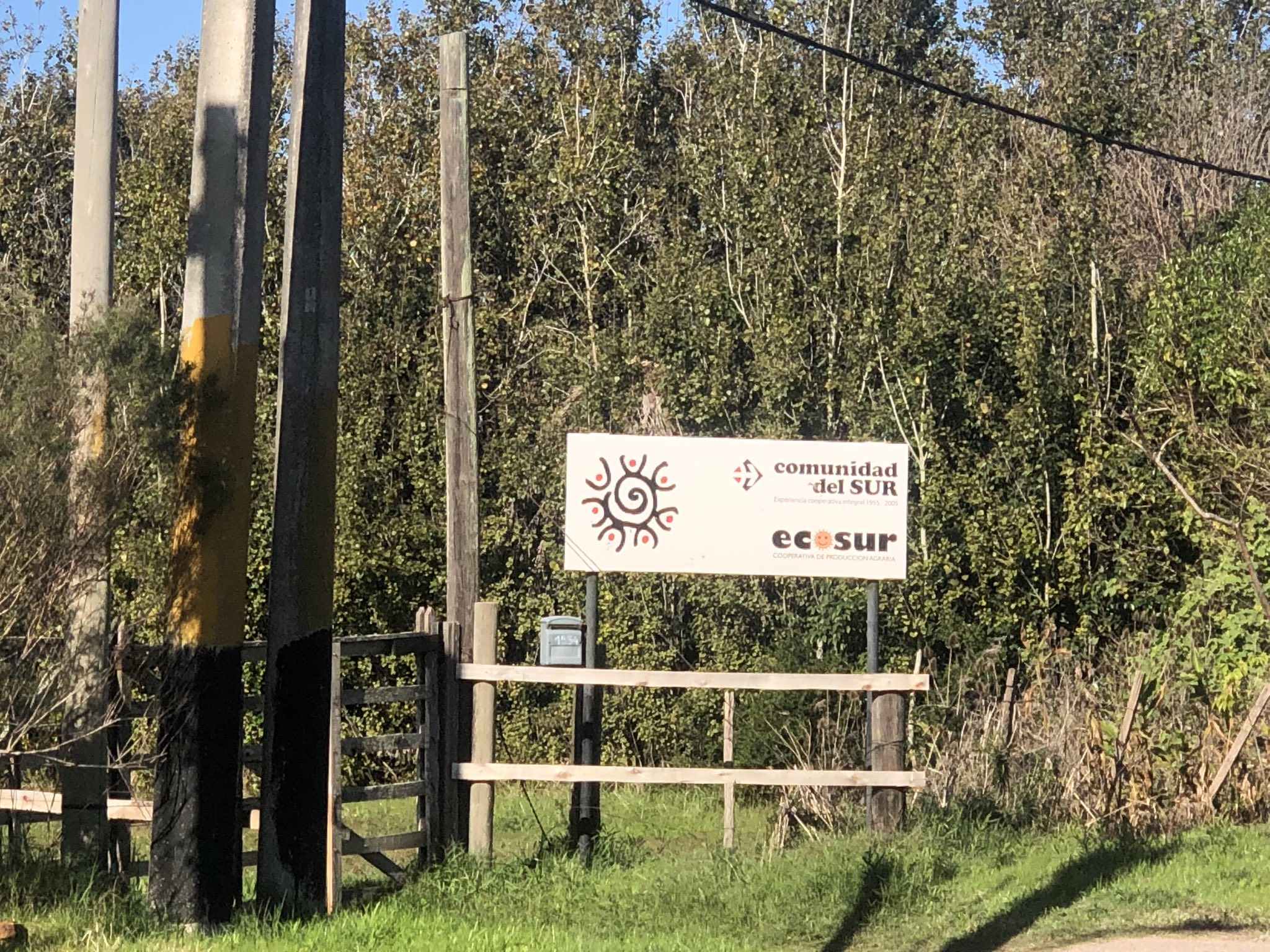
- Entry of the Comunidad in 2025
- Formation: August 20, 1955; 70 years ago
- Headquarters: Montevideo region
- Location: Uruguay

La Comunidad del Sur (in English: the Community of the South) is an Uruguayan anarcho-communist, feminist, environmentalist collective and eco-community. Founded in 1955 by Uruguayan students and artists who wanted to live according to anarchist principles, the collective settled in a suburb of Montevideo. Following the 1973 military coup and significant state repression of its members, the community went into exile in Peru and then Sweden, where it founded its publishing house, Nordan, and its graphic workshops, Tryckop. The collective returned to Uruguay after the end of the dictatorship, re-establishing itself as an eco-community.

La Comunidad del Sur and the political stances adopted by its members since the 1960s are relatively important for the evolution and political life of Uruguay on subjects such as feminism, LGBTQI+ struggles, and political ecology. The community's archives are noted as being valuable for studying South American social movements since the 1960s.

== History ==
=== Foundation and early years ===
The community was founded on 20 August 1955, in an insurrectionary context in Uruguay as an anarchist experiment in the southern district of Montevideo. Most of the participants were students opposed to the existing system; many of them were artists who felt a strong need to share and live in a community. Some members of the community were instrumental in founding the Uruguayan Anarchist Federation (FAU) the following year, in 1956. In 1964, the community moved to Malvín Norte, a neighborhood in the Uruguayan capital.

During this period, anarchists joining the community were generally people in their twenties from Uruguayan labor, trade union, or student movements. There were also couples and individuals who were expecting children. Upon joining the community, each person's assets were shared with the group, tasks were distributed equitably, and some profits were given to members based on factors like having dependent children. Historian Maite Iglesias provides the following text, adopted by the group in 1968, which synthesizes their philosophy at the time:

In the community, socialism is expressed in common ownership, in production, in consumption, and in the education of children. Consumption is based on the anticipation of needs. The community provides food, clothing, cleaning, healthcare, leisure, etc. By doing so, the community frees the family from the worry of its subsistence, 'to each according to their needs' of course, within the community's possibilities; it eliminates competition for material things, the standard of living is the same for all members; it ends the dependence of women on men, of children on parents, and achieves a direct human relationship between equal people.

By the late 1960s, repression against anarchists in Uruguay intensified. Furthermore, the community underwent various developments and began to face new questions during this period.

=== Exile ===
The community was forced into exile after the 1973 military coup, as the situation became extremely difficult for the group's anarchists due to state repression. Between 1975 and 1977, some members managed to leave the country and reach Sweden after a brief stop in Peru. This move to Europe brought them into contact with feminist and ecological movements among Latin American exiles, which influenced their political orientations. During their exile, La Comunidad del Sur founded their publishing house, Nordan, and the graphic workshops Tryckop.

=== Return ===
Following the fall of the dictatorship and the return of liberal democracy, La Comunidad returned to Montevideo and formed an eco-community project there, where the community's archives are now housed. These ecological orientations have strengthened since this period and have become one of the notable aspects of the Comunidad.

== Legacy ==
=== Ideological and practical influences ===
==== Critiques, reinterpretations of free love and idea of 'Communization of childhoods' ====
Shortly after 1968, a point of contention arose among members regarding the question of free love, which entailed rejecting marriage and supporting unions between free individuals. While anarchists theoretically subscribed to this principle, in practice, they often found themselves in traditional monogamous relationships resembling marriage, placing women in similar subordinate positions than in non-anarchists couples. This situation was widely challenged during this period by a younger generation of activists who criticized the community's choices for representing a heterosexual monogamous couple as the norm to follow. La Comunidad was also criticized by these members for its tendency to generally favor the couple model as more desirable than the absence of a couple, sexuality, or relationships with multiple partners.

Through these reflections and engagements, the community took on a significant feminist direction that impacted Uruguayan society. One notable idea developed by the group was the "communization of childhoods", where the entire community would take responsibility for the education and parental care of children. Historian Maite Iglesias Schol, who has dedicated several works to La Comunidad, summarizes its ideological and practical contributions on these subjects as follows:

As happened at the end of the 19th century, it can be argued that in Uruguay in the 1960s, it was a sector of anarchism that took on the most radical debates on the politics of gender, sexuality, and family. This challenge was at the heart of La Comunidad del Sur's proposal for radical transformation of customs, within the framework of other transformations affecting work, production, consumption, leisure, and education, which aimed for a 'bottom-up' change of the social, economic, and political system, in a libertarian socialist direction.

==== Political ecology ====
As the anarchist group evolved into an eco-community, it integrated political ecology as a fundamental principle of its organization. La Comunidad's reflections, influenced by figures like Murray Bookchin, turned towards social ecology as a means to profoundly transform humanity. The community's self-management practices reflect this: work is rotational, resources are self-managed, and agro-ecological production is done without chemical products. The community's location, between urban and rural spaces, encouraged them to integrate this philosophy into an area that bridges two different ways of life.

==== Art and exhibitions ====
In 2022, Laura Prieto, a member of the community, participated in a podcast organized by the Museo de la Solidaridad Salvador Allende in Chile, discussing some of their artistic productions and history. The museum made a number of these available online.

== Productions and Publications ==
=== Editorial and propaganda material ===
La Comunidad operates a publishing house, Nordan, and graphic workshops, Tryckop. These two anarchist cooperatives distribute and publish materials related to the political struggles of La Comunidad and anarchism.

=== Archives ===
The archives made available by the group are significantly important for the study of social movements in South America since World War II.

== Bibliography ==
- Iglesias, Maite (2024), "El Archivo de la Comunidad del Sur", Historia y problemas del siglo XX, vol. 18, no. 1
- Iglesias Schol, Maite (2024), "«Amor libre», crianza colectiva y revolución: la Comunidad del Sur en los «largos sesenta» uruguayos", Contemporánea, 18: 113–128, doi:10.54344/contemporanea.v18i1.2475
- Manaf, Ana Paula (2008), As concepções educacionais da Comunidad Del Sur: em busca de uma teoria pedagógica libertária (memoir of studies) (PDF), Universidad de Sao Paulo
