= Margareth Rago =

Brazilian feminist historian (born 1948)

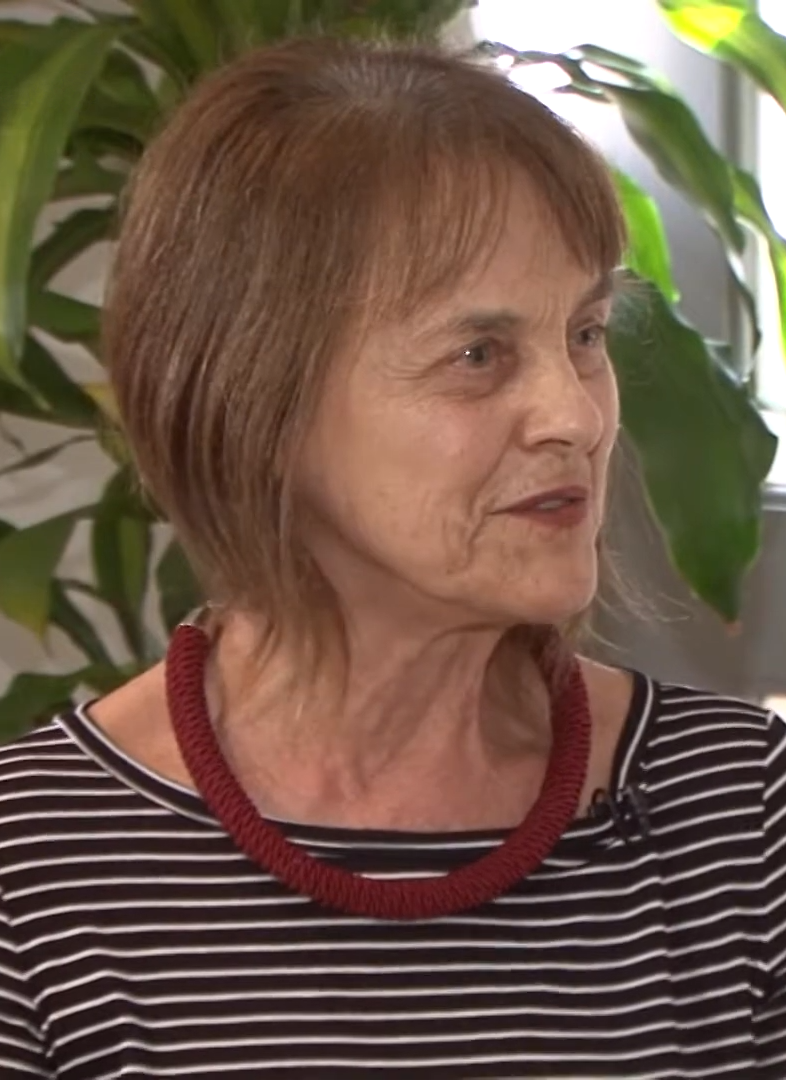
- Rago in 2017
- Born: 15 September 1948 (age 77); São Paulo, Brazil
- Education: University of São Paulo (undergraduate); State University of Campinas (postgraduate and doctorate)
- Occupation: Historian
- Years active: 1970–present
- Known for: Women's studies

Luzia Margareth Rago (born 15 September 1948) is a Brazilian historian, researcher of women's studies and feminist. She is a professor at the State University of Campinas, where she has been a lecturer since 2000. Influenced by authors such as Michel Foucault, Gilles Deleuze, Jean-François Lyotard and Jacques Derrida, she seeks to establish a specific methodology for what she calls "feminist science".

== Career ==
=== Academic background ===
In 1970, Rago graduated in history from the University of São Paulo (USP). Later, in 1979, she also graduated in philosophy from USP. Between 1982 and 1984, she worked as a professor at the Federal University of Uberlândia (UFU).

She earned a master's degree in history in 1984 from the State University of Campinas (UNICAMP), with a work entitled "Sem fé, sem lei, sem rei: liberalismo e experiência anarquista na República" (English: "Without faith, without law, without king: liberalism and the anarchist experience in the Republic"), under the supervision of Edgar Salvadori De Decca. The following year, she became a full professor in the History department of the Institute of Philosophy and Human Sciences at Unicamp (IFCH). In 1986, literary critic Sérgio Amad Costa positively reviewed Rago's book Do Cabaré ao lar: a utopia da cidade disciplinar (English: From the cabaret to the home: the utopia of the disciplinary city), reporting on the originality and scope of the research, concluding that "this is an enquiry that deserves to be read." In another review of the book, feminist periodical Mulherio noted that Rago "points to a vast moralising enterprise, aimed at taming the working class" and reveals the "redefinition of the family" with the construction of "a new model of woman".

In 1990, she received her doctorate from UNICAMP, with a thesis entitled "Os prazeres da noite: prostituição e códigos da sexualidade feminina em São Paulo (1890-1930)" (English: "The pleasures of the night: prostitution and codes of female sexuality in São Paulo (1890-1930)"), also under the supervision of De Decca. She has received two post-doctoral degrees, the first of which she received 1999 and the second in 2003, both from UNICAMP.

=== Post-doctoral work ===
In 2000, she served as director of the Edgard Leuenroth Archive (AEL), an institute linked to UNICAMP, and became a lecturer at UNICAMP itself. That same year, Rago took part in the international meeting "The Body of Women" organised by the Faculty of Medicine of the Federal University of Minas Gerais (UFMG) in Belo Horizonte. The event brought together "some of the greatest intellectuals from Brazil, Italy, France and Panama for an unprecedented debate on women", with "internationally renowned names"; besides herself, there were Michelle Perrot, Mary del Priore, Gabrielle Houbre, among other intellectuals. She was also one of the speakers at the meeting held in Rio de Janeiro to mark the centenary of Friedrich Nietzsche's birth, along with José Celso Martinez Corrêa, Fayga Ostrower and others.

In 2002, Rago, together with Luiz B. Lacerda Orlandi and Alfredo Veiga Neto, organised "Imagens de Foucault e Deleuze - ressonâncias nietzschianas" (Images of Foucault and Deleuze - Nietzschean resonances), a work that brings together the texts produced at the end of 2000 at a colloquium held at Unicamp. In the same year, she mediated a debate cycle in Rio de Janeiro titled "A política da palavra" (The politics of the word), which saw the participation of Tom Zé, Carlos Heitor Cony, Ferreira Gullar and others. In 2003, Rago held a series of seminars at the Paris Diderot University, in France.

Together with Alfredo Veiga Neto, Rago organised the collection "Figures of Foucault" in 2006, the year in which the thinker would have turned eighty. In 2009, she took part in Gabriela Leite's episode of Roda Viva as one of the interviewers. Between 2010 and 2011, she was a visiting professor at Columbia University, in New York City. She also coordinated and wrote several articles for the feminist studies journal Labrys.

In 2016, she took part in TV Cultura's Café Filosófico programme, in which she discussed the theme of Da insubmissão feminista na atualidade (English: Feminist resistance today).

== Selected works ==
- Sem fé, sem lei, sem rei: liberalismo e experiência anarquista na República (Unicamp, 1984)
- Do Cabaré ao lar: a utopia da cidade disciplinar – Brasil, 1890-1930 (Paz e Terra, 1985);
- Os Prazeres da Noite: prostituição e códigos da sexualidade feminina em São Paulo, 1890-1930 (Paz e Terra, 1991);
- Trabalho feminino e sexualidade de Margareth Rago (Contexto, 1998)
- Narrar o passado, repensar a história (with Renato Aloizio de Oliveira Gimenes) (Editora da Unicamp, 2000);
- Foucault, a história e o anarquismo (Achiamé, 2004);
- A mulher brasileira nos espaços público e privado (Editora da Fundação Perseu Abramo, 2004);
- Feminismo e anarquismo no Brasil: audácia de sonhar (Achiamé, 2007)
- Subjetividades antigas e modernas (with Pedro Paulo Funari) (Annablume, 2008);
- Para uma vida não-fascista (with Alfredo Veiga-Neto) (Autêntica Editora, 2009);
- A aventura de contar-se: feminismos, escrita de si e invenções da subjetividade (Editora da Unicamp, 2013);
- É inútil revoltar-se? (Editora da Unicamp, 2017);
- Do cabaré ao lar: A utopia da cidade disciplinar e a resistência anarquista (Paz e Terra, 2018);
- Neoliberalismo, feminismos e contracondutas: perspectivas foucaultianas (Editora Intermeios, 2019);
- As Marcas da Pantera - percursos de uma historiadora (Editora Intermeios, 2021)
