= Luigi Fabbri =

Italian anarchist (1877–1935)

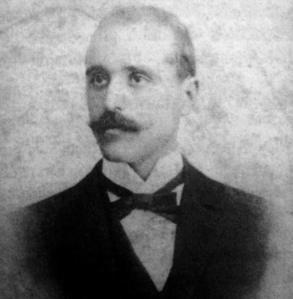
- Born: 23 December 1877; Fabriano, Ancona, Kingdom of Italy
- Died: 24 June 1935 (aged 57); Montevideo, Uruguay
- Education: University of Macerata
- Occupations: Writer, anarchist activist
- Spouse: Bianca Sbriccoli
- Children: Luce and Vero

Luigi Fabbri (1877–1935) was an Italian anarchist writer and educator. He agitated against wars by the Kingdom of Italy and contributed to the Italian anarchist press. He was forced to flee the country after the rise of the fascist regime. He was the father of Luce Fabbri.

== Biography ==
Luigi Fabbri was born in the eastern Italian town of Fabriano, on 23 December 1877. He was raised in Montefiore dell'Aso and went to secondary school in Recanati. He first discovered anarchism at the age of 15, and soon joined the Italian anarchist movement. He was arrested and imprisoned for printing anti-militarist pamphlets during the First Italo-Ethiopian War. In 1896, he enrolled at the University of Macerata, where he studied law. The following year, he met the anarchist Errico Malatesta, who became his best friend. In 1898, Fabbri was detained on the island of Ponza and later in Favignana; he was released in 1900.

In 1903, Fabbri and Pietro Gori established the newspaper Il Pensiero and began contributing to the Paterson-based newspaper La Questione Sociale. Over the subsequent years, Fabbri moved throughout Italy working as a teacher, while under constant surveillance from the police. In 1907, he joined Malatesta at the International Anarchist Congress of Amsterdam. During the Red Week of 1914, Fabbri momentarily fled Italy to Switzerland. He then returned to agitate against the Italian entry into World War I, for which he was again arrested. He continued his work as a teacher in Bologna, while clandestinely carrying on his anti-war agitation in Umanita Nova.

After the war, Fabbri promoted the establishment of the Italian Anarchist Communist Union (UCAI) and continued publishing books and contributing to anarchist publications. After the rise of Benito Mussolini to power, he was attacked by fascists. After he declined to swear an oath of allegiance to the fascist state, in 1926, he fled Italy. He first moved to Switzerland, then on to Paris, but he was soon expelled to Belgium. In 1929, he moved to Uruguay, where he continued writing for anarchist publications. He died in Montevideo on 24 June 1935.

== Selected works ==
- Life of Malatesta, translated by Adam Wight (originally published 1936). This book was published again with expanded content in 1945.
- Malatesta: L'Uomo e il Pensiero
- Letters to a Woman on Anarchy, 1905
- Workers' Organisation and Anarchy, 1906 pamphlet
- Anarchist Organisation, 1907 pamphlet
- The School and the Revolution, 1912
- Letters to a Socialist, 1913
- The Aware Generation, 1913
- Bourgeois Influences on Anarchism, 1914
- Dictatorship and Revolution, 1921
- Preventive Counter-revolution, 1922

== Bibliography ==
- Lamendola, Francesco (1997). "Remembering Luigi Fabbri". KSL: Bulletin of the Kate Sharpley Library (11). Translated by Sharkey, Paul. ISSN 1475-0309.
