= Mujer y Salud en Uruguay =

Mujer y Salud en Uruguay (MYSU; literally translated, Woman and Health in Uruguay) is a feminist non-governmental organisation founded in Uruguay 1996. Its mission is the "promotion and protection of sexual and reproductive health and rights (SRHR) from a gender and generations' perspective". The headquarters are in Montevideo, where an interdisciplinary team works alongside a national and regional network of professionals and investigators. The current chairwoman is Lilián Abracinskas.

== History ==
In 1996, MYSU emerged as a space for expression and coordination for various women's organisations and individuals. The space was created to be used for debate and the promotion of demands regarding SRHR in Uruguay. A good example of this is the organisation of First National Gathering regarding women's health in 2017, modelled on the yearly gathering in Argentina since 1985. MYSU was also one of the first organisations to report on the public policies made by the National Follow-up Commission (CNSmujeres) regarding women's health and SRHR.

In 2004 MYSU established itself as a non-profit, civil association. Since then they have been organising citizen campaigns to promote the legalization of abortion in Uruguay, the institution of SRHR services and the promotion of exercising rights to benefit citizens.

In 2007 MYSU founded the National Observatory of Gender and Sexual and Reproductive Health. The Observatory publishes yearly studies monitoring the implementation of public policies and the quality of the national health services. These studies serve as evidence to back up demands set by citizens, which are elaborated upon by other social actors and academics.

During its existence, MYSU has become part of several official Uruguayan delegations to the United Nations and has worked internationally by networking with organisations around the world. Additionally, the organisation is part of or has contacts with various other organisations, such as CNSmujeres, Red de Salud de las Mujeres Latinoamericanas y del Caribe (RSMLAC - the Women's Health Network for Latin America and the Caribbean) and the International Women's Health Coalition (IWHC). Being an organisation concerned with gender and SRHR, it has participated in multiple inter-institutional fora, such as the National Institute for Women's Uruguayan National Board for Gender, the Council for Gender Equality in Montevideo and the Open Government Network.

== Promoting human rights ==
On their website, MYSU divides the promotion of human rights into three categories. It argues that:

- The government must guarantee, respect and protect the human rights of every individual through laws and public policies, in order that citizens are able to exercise their sexual and reproductive rights. Furthermore, the distribution and assurance of the universality and completeness of sexual education and sexual and reproductive health services is vital to better the qualitative attention and access to the services.
- Society must recognise and respect the human rights of every individual, without stigma or discrimination. Citizens' demands must be generated so that each person, in the entirety of the country, has the guaranteed possibility of exercising their sexual and reproductive rights.
- Each person must have the capacity and power to take their own decisions in a free and informed manner regarding their reproductive and sexual life. Furthermore, they must have access to the resources necessary to be able to put their decisions into action safely, effectively and without suffering from discrimination or violence.

== Lines of work ==
MYSU has four principal lines of work:

- Incidence refers to the development of strategies to promote human rights and the inclusion of gender equality in public policies and citizenship.
- Researching, writing and publishing studies about gender and health for the National Observatory of Gender and Sexual and Reproductive Health.
- Promotion and communication by developing awareness-raising activities and diffusing knowledge about how to exercise and defend SRHR to organisations, groups and individuals.
- Schooling, consulting and technical assistance for human resources departments, health professionals and professionals with a background in the social sciences in implementing short modes of training. Additionally, the consulting of groups, social organisations, members of parliament as well as public and private institutions at national and regional level.

== External links (all in Spanish) ==
- Official website
- YouTube channel
- Official publications
