= Macarena Gelman =

Uruguayan politician and activist (born 1976)

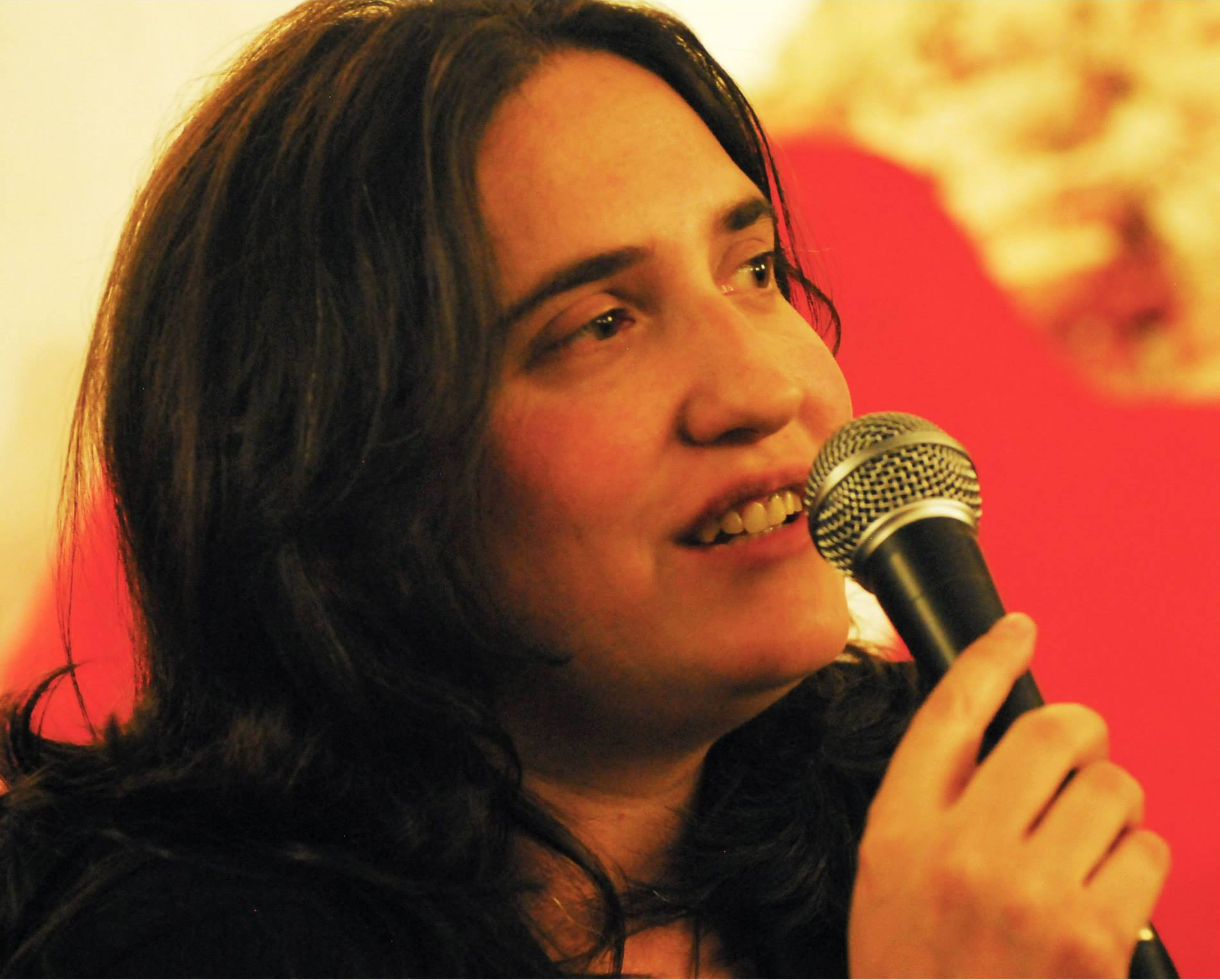
Gelman in 2014

María Macarena Gelman García (born 1 November 1976, in Montevideo) is a Uruguayan activist and politician of Argentine descent. She is a granddaughter of Argentine poet Juan Gelman.

In March 2014, Gelman decided to take part in politics and endorsed the presidential candidacy of Constanza Moreira. At the same time, she declared her own candidacy to the Uruguayan Parliament for the Broad Front in the October elections.

Gelman's identity recovery and meeting with her grandfather are portrayed at Jorge Batlle: entre el cielo y el infierno, a 2024 documentary directed by Federico Lemos.
