= Uruguayan Anarchist Federation =

Uruguayan Anarchist Federation Federación Anarquista Uruguaya
- Abbreviation: FAU
- Leader: Collective leadership
- Founded: 1956
- Ideology: Anarcho-communism; Especifismo; Platformism
- International affiliation: Anarkismo.net

Website
- http://federacionanarquistauruguaya.uy/

Uruguayan Anarchist Federation (Federación Anarquista Uruguaya, commonly known as FAU) is a Uruguayan anarchist organization founded in 1956. The FAU was created by anarchist militants to be a specifically anarchist organization. The FAU was the first organization to promote the organizational concept of Especifismo.

== History ==
The FAU began with the collection of ideological and cultural traditions contributed by Italian, Galician and Catalan anarcho-communist and anarcho-syndicalist refugees, that fled fascist persecution during the Spanish Civil War and World War II. The organization was involved, from the outset, in social struggles around the country, working on the strengthening of trade unions and advancing towards workers' unity.

In the early 1960s, the FAU took part in the structure of the “Coordinator” (Spanish: El Coordinator), the predecessor of the Tupamaros. When the MLN-T emerged from it in 1966, the federation did not elect to join the new organization. However, Jorge Zabalza, a member of the FAU, did join the Tupamaros in an individual capacity.

In 1967 the Uruguayan government ordered the dissolution of the FAU, which went underground. Its activity was restructured according to the new situation, and they began to develop a clandestine network for the printing and distribution of propaganda. In 1968, the FAU decided to create a mass front called the Student Workers' Resistance (Spanish: Resistencia Obrero Estudiantil, ROE), which organized neighborhood militants, labor unionists and combative students into a popular front.

Flag of the Thirty-Three Orientals.

The state of emergency and the militarization of political life also led the FAU to develop an armed structure. The Popular Revolutionary Organization-33 (Spanish: Organización Popular Revolucionaria-33, OPR-33), an armed arm of the FAU, was launched and began to carry out a series of direct actions: sabotages, expropriations, kidnappings of political leaders and industrial employers, armed support of strikes, occupations of factories, etc. The OPR-33 also published an underground weekly, and created an infrastructure network to prepare its actions and protect its activists. On 19 April 1969, they stole the flag of the Thirty-Three Orientals from the National Historical Museum. Opposed to electoral participation, they advocated abstention in the 1971 general election, refusing to support the Broad Front. In 1975, activists of the FAU, the ROE and the OPR-33 in exile in Buenos Aires (Hugo Cores, Gerardo Gatti and Léon Duarte) founded the People's Victory Party (Spanish: Partido por la Victoria del Pueblo, PVP), a Libertarian Marxist group sympathetic to the Cuban Revolution. The PVP would later abandon anarchism for electoralism and became part of the Broad Front.

Cornered by the repression of Uruguayan and Argentine special services, about fifty FAU members were tortured, killed and disappeared, while others were sentenced to long years in prison. When the Civic-military dictatorship of Uruguay fell in 1985, the FAU faced an immediate reorganization effort. The FAU, since its reorganization, helped in the creation of several similar anarchist organizations in Brazil and Argentina, including the Federação Anarquista Gaúcha (FAG), the Federação Anarquista Cabocla (FACA), the Federação Anarquista do Rio de Janeiro (FARJ) in Brazil, the Anarchist Federation of Rosario (FAR); and the underground Argentine organization AUCA (Rebel).

Today their social efforts cover broad sectors: organizing in trade unions, schools, parental councils and neighborhood associations, protecting the environment, writing to prisoners, and building a social housing cooperative. They also run a printing press, 6 community radio stations, 4 athenaeums, 3 libraries and built a Solidarity and Mutual Support Space. In late 2024 the UCL joined the International Coordination of Organized Anarchism, an international network of platformist and especifist anarchist groups.

== See also ==
- Anarchism in Uruguay
- List of anarchist organizations
- Alberto Mechoso
- Uruguayan Regional Workers' Federation
