= Cotidiano Mujer =

Cotidiano Mujer (Everyday Woman) is a Uruguayan feminist collective based in Montevideo. The group's mission is to contribute to promotion of social, cultural, and political change that works towards gender equity and democracy among women in Uruguay and Latin America. It has published a newspaper, as well as books and conference proceedings. The group has also presented a radio show and podcast.

== History ==
Established in 1985, Cotidiano Mujer started out as a feminist magazine of the same name.

In 1988 Cotidiano Mujer published a book Yo aborto, tú abortas, todas callamos (I have an abortion, you have an abortion, we all keep silent). In 1994 they launched a radio show, Nunca en Domingo (Never on Sunday). Initially produced and presented by all members of the collective, but as time went on Elena Fonseca took the lead. Airing on 970 AM Universal, the show attracted between 2,000 and 7,000 listeners in 2012–2015, about half the number of listeners for Uruguay's most popular AM radio station. In 2015 the radio show was reshaped as a podcast.

In July 2021, Cotidiano Mujer launched a campaign for democratic gender parity (democracia paritaria), highlighting the fact that – although Uruguay achieved women's suffrage in 1927, the first South American country to do so – its 2017 Quota Law had been under-applied, and the country was not even ranked in the first 100 in the world in its percentage of women parliamentarians.

== Publications ==
- Yo aborto, tú abortas, todas callamos (I have an abortion, you have an abortion, we all keep silent). Montevideo: Ediciones Cotidiano Mujer, 1988.
- Los medios del futuro, el futuro de los medios : seminario realizado en Montevideo, el 22 y 23 de octubre 1993. Montevideo: Cotidiano Mujer, 1993.
- Milena Pereira, Hugo Valiente, eds. Regímenes jurídicos sobre trabajo doméstico remunerado en los estados del Mercosur = Regimes jurídicos sobre trabalho doméstico remunerado nos estados do Mercosul. Montevideo: Cotidiano Mujer, 2007.
- Niki Johnson, Gabriel Delacoste, Cecilia Rocha and Marcela Schenck, eds.Renovación, paridad : horizontes aún lejanos para la representación política de las mujeres en las elecciones uruguayas 2014. Montevideo: Cotidiano Mujer, 2015.
- Niki Johnson, La inserción del aborto en la agenda político-pública uruguaya 1985-2013: un análisis desde el movimiento feminista. Montevideo: Cotidiano Mujer, 2015.
