= María Emilia Islas =

Uruguayan political activist

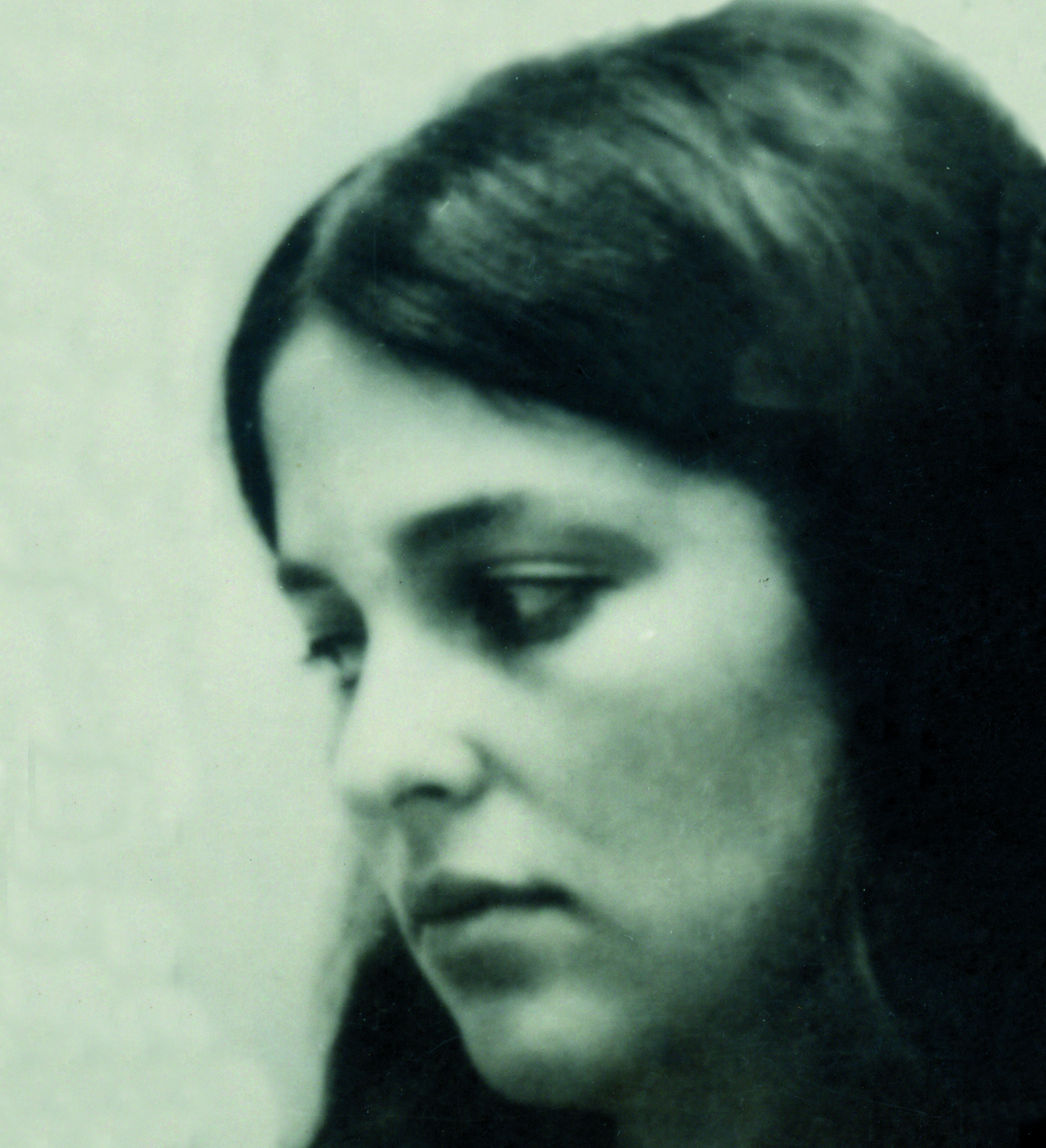
- Born: María Emilia Islas Gatti; 18 April 1953; Montevideo, Uruguay
- Disappeared: 27 September 1976; Buenos Aires, Argentina
- Status: Missing for 49 years, 11 months and 25 days
- Spouse: Jorge Roberto Zaffaroni Castilla
- Children: Mariana Zaffaroni

María Emilia Islas Gatti (18 April 1953 – disappeared 27 September 1976) was a Uruguayan political activist and anarchist, who disappeared in Buenos Aires in 1976.

== Biography ==
She was born on 18 April 1953, at the Harvard Clinical Sanatorium in Montevideo. The only daughter of María Ester Gatti and Ramón Islas, María Emilia was named for her grandmother. She lived her first years in the Cordon neighbourhood.

In 1965, María Emilia entered the Zorillia de San Martin high school where she became engaged in politics and political organizing. In 1970 she became more involved and joined the Federación Anarquista Uruguaya (FAU), the Oriental Revolutionary Popular Organization 33 (OPR 33); Asociación de Estudiantes de Magisterio en la Resistencia Obrero Estudiantil (ROE) and finally in Argentina, with the Party for Victory of the People (PVP).

On 28 November 1973, she married Jorge Zaffaroni, also an activist. By 1974, the political situation in Uruguay became intolerable, so they left for Buenos Aires. María Emilia arrived during the second week of December, then six months pregnant. Zaffaroni joined her on 11 January 1975, and their daughter Mariana was born on 22 March 1975.

== Disappearance ==
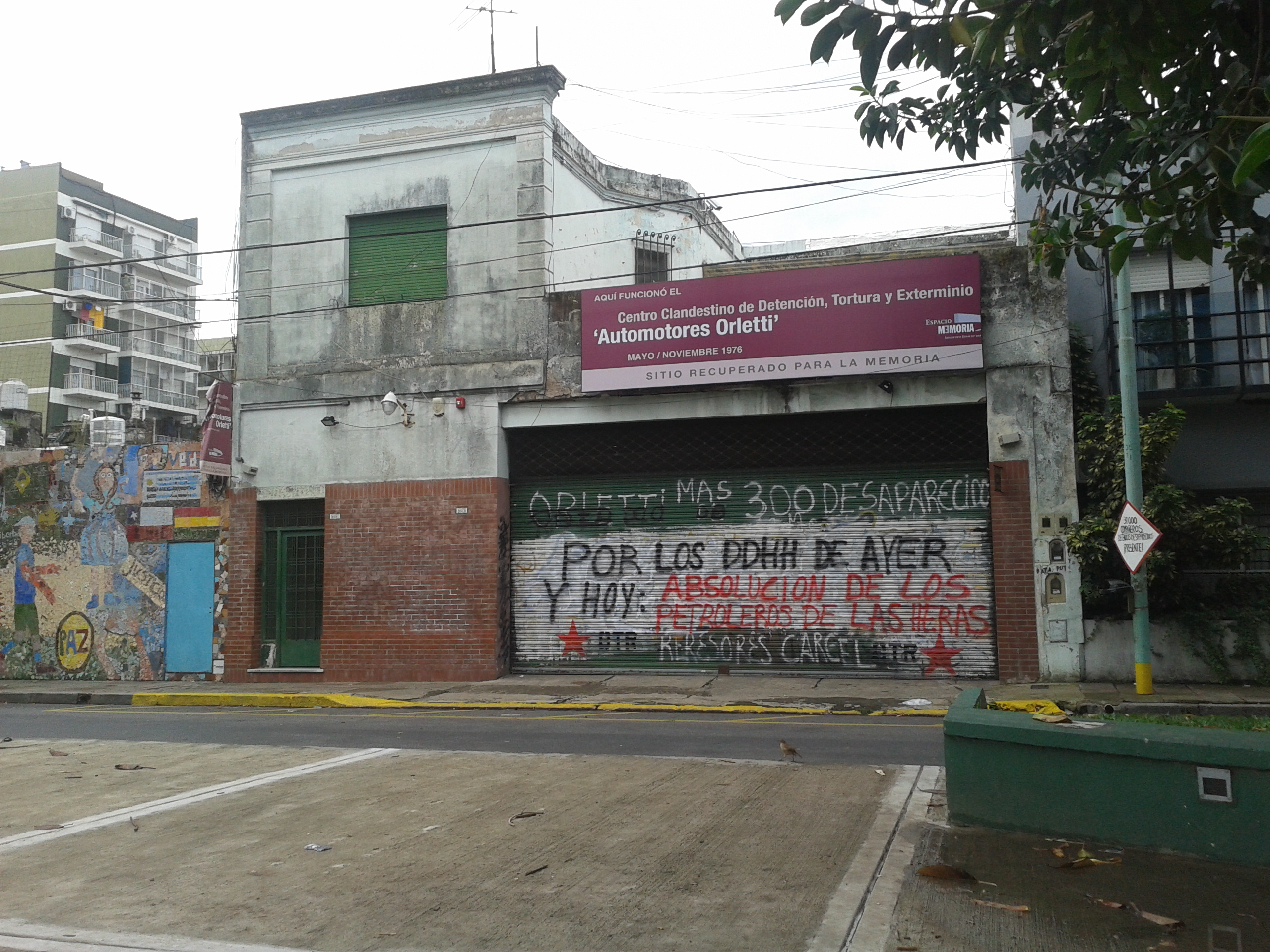
Storefront of "Automotores Orletti" which functioned as a clandestine detention centre during the Argentinian military dictatorship.

The family was arrested on 27 September 1976 at their home in Parque Chacabuco, Buenos Aires. They were then taken to the clandestine detention center "Automotores Orletti." According to testimony given by Orestes Estanisalo Bello, the couple was interrogated by personnel from the Servicio de Inteligencia Uruguayo (SID). They were suspected to be members of OPR-33, a Uruguayan militant group based in Buenos Aires. Their detention and disappearance was part of the Dirty War tactics under "Operation Condor".

María Emilia was most likely moved to a final destination between 5 and 6 October 1976. She and Jorge Zaffaroni remain on a list of missing Uruguayans in Argentina.

Her mother, María Ester Gatti, was an active member of Madres y Familiares de Detenidos Desaparecidos. Due to her persistence, Islas' daughter was located in 1983, and her identity confirmed in 1993.

== See also ==
- List of people who disappeared mysteriously: post-1970
