= Constanza Moreira =

Uruguayan politician (born 1960)

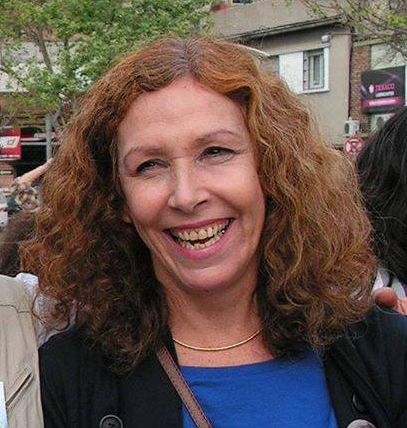
Constanza Moreira.

Constanza Moreira (born 22 February 1960 in Montevideo) is a Uruguayan political scientist and politician. A member of the Movement of Popular Participation, Broad Front, she was elected Senator in the 2009 Uruguayan general election.

In September 2013 she accepted her presidential candidacy for the 2014 elections, which was formally announced in November of the same year. She received the support of several left-wing groups, including the newly founded Ir, with the participation of Macarena Gelman. Today, she lost the national election, and do not win any position.
