= 1999 Uruguayan presidential primaries =

Presidential primary elections were held in Uruguay on 25 April 1999 in order to nominate the presidential candidate for every political party taking part in the 1999 Uruguayan general election.

== Background ==
The formally called elecciones internas (Spanish for 'Internal elections') are the first stage of the electoral system established by the Constitution of 1997. This was the first election in whico the single candidates for President of Uruguay per party for the general election were elected. In addition, the integration of the National Deliberative Body and the different Departmental Deliberative Bodies of the different parties, which have the function of nominating the candidate for president and vice president of each party, and the candidates for mayors for the municipal elections of 2000 are also elected.

In accordance with the transitory provisions of the Constitution, the primary elections are held on the last Sunday of June of the electoral year, and those "qualified to vote"—all those over 18 years of age and registered in the Civic Registry and with a civic credential―can participate in the secret and non-compulsory suffrage.

In order to win the primary election and be proclaimed a presidential candidate, the pre-candidate must obtain an absolute majority of the party's valid votes. In the event that no pre-candidate obtains that majority, the winner will be the one that exceeds 40% of the votes and leads the second by no less than 10 percentage points. If none of these circumstances occur, the deliberative body elected in the election will nominate the party's candidate for president by an absolute majority of its members.

The participation of the parties in the elections is mandatory. In addition, each one had to obtain at least 500 votes to participate in the general elections.

== Candidates ==
The requirement to choose a single presidential candidate created tension in some parties.

- The National Party had five candidates:
  - Luis Alberto Lacalle (winner), who had been president from 1990 to 1995.
  - Juan Andrés Ramírez, former minister in Lacalle's cabinet (and afterwards an archenemy).
  - Alberto Volonté, former chair of UTE.
  - Álvaro Ramos, former minister in the cabinets of Lacalle and Sanguinetti.
  - Alem García, representative.
- The Colorado Party had five candidates:
  - Jorge Batlle (winner), member of a notable political family and senator.
  - Luis Hierro López, minister in Sanguinetti's cabinet.
  - Víctor Vaillant, former representative.
  - Federico Bouza, former senator.
  - César Cabrera.
- The Broad Front had two candidates:
  - Tabaré Vázquez (winner), a notable oncologist and former mayor of Montevideo.
  - Danilo Astori, senator and rival of Vázquez.
- The Civic Union had two candidates:
  - Luis Pieri (winner)
  - Aldo Lamorte

Other parties had unopposed candidates running:

- New Space: Rafael Michelini
- Worker's Party: Rafael Fernández
- Goodwill Party: Belarmino Pintos
