= List of political parties in Uruguay =

Uruguay has a multi-party system with three dominant political parties, with extreme difficulty for anybody to achieve electoral success under the banner of any other party. It may be said that to some extent the 'fault lines' of Uruguay's politics have run within the historically dominant Colorado and National parties. Uruguay underwent an intermittent series of civil wars through much of the 19th century, which ended in 1904, and the party system has in the past reflected regional loyalties which emerged during that period. However, with the eclipse in 2004 of the Colorado Party and, indeed, the cooperation of the Colorado and National parties during the 1999 Presidential elections, some realignment of traditional loyalties has come into play. However, the independence of both parties is maintained by members of Colorado and National parties.

The participation of leading figures from both the Colorado and the National parties in the civilian-military administrations of 1973-1985 may have played a role in causing long-term traditional party loyalties to shift somewhat. Critics of these two parties may argue that they have to some extent been compromised with the past willingness of some of their prominent members to work with the civilian-military administrations of 1973-1985. Supporters may argue that in the difficult circumstances of the years in question such participation as was afforded by Colorado and National members to the civilian-military administrations was against the background of political figures (from both EP-FA-NM and National parties, such as Liber Seregni and Wilson Ferreira Aldunate) who were exiled and/or incarcerated, thus playing no part at all in the country's affairs until circumstances were more fortuitous for them. Furthermore, Ferreira Aldunate and Seregni were banned from participating in the first "return to democracy" elections of 1984, where Julio María Sanguinetti was elected.

Economic problems may have substantially contributed to the Uruguayan electorate's willingness in 2004 to move away from the traditional parties. Factionalism is strong in all of Uruguay's major parties. The Broad Front is in fact a coalition of autonomous political parties that vary in ideological outlook, while the Colorado and National parties are also composed of divergent factions with autonomous identities within those parties.

== Parties ==
Party	Political Position	Ideology	Chamber	Senate	Intendencias	Mayors
Broad Front; Frente Amplio	Centre-left to left-wing	Progressivism; Social democracy; Democratic socialism	48 / 99	16 / 30	4 / 19	32 / 125
National Party; Partido Nacional	Centre-right	Liberal conservatism; Christian democracy	29 / 99	9 / 30	15 / 19	87 / 125
Colorado Party; Partido Colorado	Right-wing	Conservatism	17 / 99	5 / 30	1 / 19	3 / 125
Sovereign Identity; Identidad Soberana	Far-right	Nationalism; Conspiracy theorism; Sovereigntism; Identitarianism	2 / 99	0 / 30	0 / 19	0 / 125
Open Cabildo; Cabildo Abierto	Far-right	National conservatism; Right-wing populism; Militarism; Economic interventionism	2 / 99	0 / 30	0 / 19	0 / 125
Independent Party; Partido Independiente	Centre	Christian humanism	1 / 99	0 / 30	0 / 19	3 / 125
Environmental Constitutional Party; Partido Constitucional Ambientalista		Green conservatism; Constitutionalism	0 / 99	0 / 30	—N/a	—N/a
Popular Unity; Unidad Popular	Left-wing to far-left	Socialism; Anti-capitalism; Anti-imperialism	0 / 99	0 / 30	—N/a	—N/a
Ecologist Radical Intransigent Party; Partido Ecologista Radical Intransigente	Centre to centre-left	Radicalism; Green liberalism; Green politics; Social liberalism	0 / 99	0 / 30	—N/a	—N/a
For Necessary Changes; Por los Cambios Necesarios			0 / 99	0 / 30	—N/a	—N/a
Republican Advance Party; Partido Avanzar Republicano			0 / 99	0 / 30	—N/a	—N/a
Workers' Party; Partido de los Trabajadores	Left-wing to far-left	Trotskyism	0 / 99	0 / 30	—N/a	—N/a
Green Animalist Party; Partido Verde Animalista	Centre to centre-right	Green conservatism; Animal rights; Direct democracy	0 / 99	0 / 30	—N/a	—N/a
Digital Party; Partido Digital		E-democracy	0 / 99	0 / 30	—N/a	—N/a

=== Parties represented in the General Assembly ===
- Broad Front (Frente Amplio) (1971–present)
  - Uruguay Assembly (Asamblea Uruguay) (1994–present)
  - Broad Front Confluence (Confluencia Frenteamplio)
  - Current 78 (Corriente 78)
  - Movement of Popular Participation (Movimiento de Participación Popular) (1989–present)
  - Christian Democratic Party of Uruguay (Partido Demócrata Cristiano del Uruguay) (1962–present)
  - Communist Party of Uruguay (Partido Comunista del Uruguay) (1920–present)
  - Party of the Communes (Partido de los Comunes)
  - Socialist Party of Uruguay (Partido Socialista del Uruguay) (1910–present)
  - Artiguista Fall (Vertiente Artiguista) (1989–present)
  - Progressive Alliance (Alianza Progresista) (1999–present)
  - New Space (Nuevo Espacio) (1994–present)
- National Party (Partido Nacional) (1836–present)
  - National Alliance (Alianza Nacional)
- Colorado Party (Partido Colorado) (1836–present)
- Sovereign Identity (Identidad Soberana) (2022–present)
- Open Cabildo (2019–present)
- Independent Party (Partido Independiente) (2003–present)

=== Unrepresented parties ===
- Anti-imperialist Unitary Commissions (2008–present)
- Civic Union (1971–present)
- Digital Party (2015–present)
- Ecologist Radical Intransigent Party (PERI) (2014–present)
- For Necessary Changes (Por los Cambios Necesarios) (2024–present)
- Green Animalist Party (2018–present)
- Oriental Revolutionary Movement (Movimiento Revolucionario Oriental) (1961–present)
- Popular Unity (Unidad Popular) (2006–present)
  - March 26 Movement (Movimiento 26 de Marzo)
- Republican Advance Party (Partido Avanzar Republicano) (2023–present)
- Resistance Party (2017–present)
- Workers' Party (1984–present)

=== Defunct parties ===
- Liberal Union (1855)
- Constitutional Party (1880–1903)
- Independent National Party (1931–???)
- Black Native Party (1936–1944)
- Liga Nacional de Acción Ruralista (1964–???)
- Liberal Party (2002–2009)
- Party of the People (2016–2022)

== Bibliography ==
- González, Luis Eduardo (1996). Mainwaring, Scott; Scully, Timothy (eds.). Continuidad y cambio en el sistema de partidos uruguayo (PDF). La Construcción de Instituciones Democráticas. Sistemas de Partidos en América Latina (in Spanish). Santiago de Chile: Cieplan. Archived from the original (PDF) on 2014-02-22.
- Gros Espiell, Héctor. "Regulación jurídica de los partidos políticos en Uruguay" (PDF) (in Spanish).
- Guerra, Pablo A. "Para comprender la estructura política en Uruguay" (in Spanish).

== See also ==
- Politics of Uruguay
- List of political parties by country
