= Bertha Sanseverino =

Uruguayan politician (1946–2018)

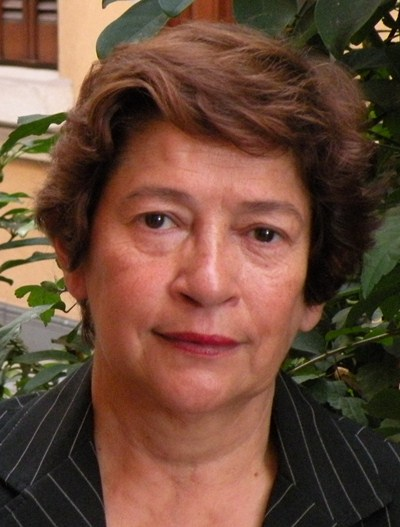
- Sanseverino in 2010

National Representative of the Chamber of Representatives of Uruguay
- In office February 15, 2010 – June 18, 2018

Member of the Departmental Board of Montevideo
- In office 1995–2004

Personal details
- Born: April 25, 1946 Montevideo, Uruguay
- Died: June 18, 2018 (aged 72) Montevideo, Uruguay
- Party: Broad Front; Uruguay Assembly
- Spouse: Nelson Latorre (1950-1999; his death)
- Children: Inés

Bertha Elba Sanseverino Mansilla (April 25, 1946 – June 18, 2018) was a Uruguayan politician and member of the Broad Front (Frente Amplio) since 1971 and the Liber Seregni Front faction of the Uruguay Assembly, a social democratic political party. Sanseverino served as a member of the Departmental Board of Montevideo (Junta Departamental de Montevideo), the legislative body of Montevideo Department, for two terms from 1995 until 2004. In 2010, she was elected to the national Chamber of Representatives of Uruguay, where she served until her death in office in June 2018.

== Biography ==
Bertha Sanseverino was born in Colonia del Sacramento on April 25, 1946. She became the leader of the Law Student Center (Centro de Estudiantes de Derecho) in 1968 and a member of the Federation of Uruguayan University Students (la Federación de Estudiantes Universitarios Uruguayos) beginning in 1970.

Sanseverino had been a member of the Broad Front since its establishment in 1971. She and her husband, Nelson Latorre, were opponents of the Civic-military dictatorship of Uruguay, a military dictatorship which ruled the country from 1973 until 1985. In 1977, Bertha Sanseverino fled into exile in France with her daughter following the arrest of her husband by the military regime.

Sanseverino returned from exile following the restoration of democracy in the mid-1980s. She was elected to the Departmental Board of Montevideo Department in 1994 and won re-election to the Board in 1999.

In 2005, Uruguay President Tabaré Vázquez, the first Broad Front politician to achieve the presidency, appointed Sanseverino as head of the Plan de Atención Nacional a la Emergencia Social (PANES), an agency within the Ministry of Social Development (MIDES). She was later appointed National Director of Critical Assistance and Social Inclusion. Sanseverino remained at the Ministry of Social Development until February 2010, when she was sworn in as an elected member of the Chamber of Representatives of Uruguay.

Sanseverino, a sitting member of the Chamber of Representatives, died in Montevideo on June 18, 2018, at the age of 72. A At the time, she had been hospitalized at the Centro de Tratamiento Intensivo (CTI) hospital in Montevideo for a week due to serious health conditions.
