= Vertiente Artiguista =

Political party in Uruguay

Artiguist Tendency Vertiente Artiguista
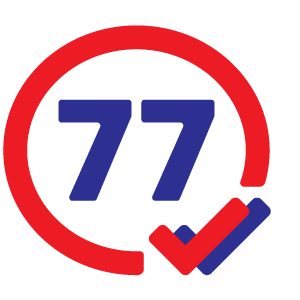
- President: Enrique Rubio
- Founded: 2 May 1989; 36 years ago
- Headquarters: San José 1191, Montevideo, Uruguay
- Youth wing: Vertiente Youth
- Ideology: Artiguism; Social democracy Progressivism
- Political position: Centre-left
- National affiliation: Broad Front
- Regional affiliation: São Paulo Forum

Website
- www.vertiente.org.uy

The Vertiente Artiguista is a social-democratic political party in Uruguay led by Enrique Rubio, who has been Senator of Uruguay since February 15th, 2000.

It is variously translated as Artiguist Tendency, Artiguist Slant, and Artiguist Source. The adjective Artiguist honors the 19th-century national hero José Artigas. The noun vertiente means "slope" literally and can also mean "point of view" and "aspect".

== Election results ==
=== Presidential elections ===
Due to its membership in the Broad Front, the party has endorsed the candidates of other parties on several occasions. Presidential elections in Uruguay are held using a two-round system, the results of which are displayed below.

Election	Party candidate	Running mate	Votes	%	Votes	%	Result
Election	Party candidate	Running mate	First Round		Second Round		Result
1989	Liber Seregni	Danilo Astori	418,403	20.35%			Lost ✗
1994	Tabaré Vázquez	Rodolfo Nin Novoa	621,226	30.6%			Lost ✗
1999	Tabaré Vázquez	Rodolfo Nin Novoa	861,202	40.1%	982,049	45.9%	Lost ✗
2004	Tabaré Vázquez	Rodolfo Nin Novoa	1,124,761	51.7%			Elected ✓
2009	José Mujica	Danilo Astori	1,105,262	47.96%	1,197,638	54.63%	Elected ✓
2014	Tabaré Vázquez	Raúl Sendic	1,134,187	47.81%	1,226,105	53.48%	Elected ✓
2019	Daniel Martínez	Graciela Villar	949,376	40.49%	1,152,271	49.21%	Lost ✗
2024	Yamandú Orsi	Carolina Cosse	1,071,826	46.12%	1,196,798	52.08%	Elected ✓
