= Socialist Party of Uruguay =

Uruguayan political party

Socialist Party of Uruguay Partido Socialista del Uruguay
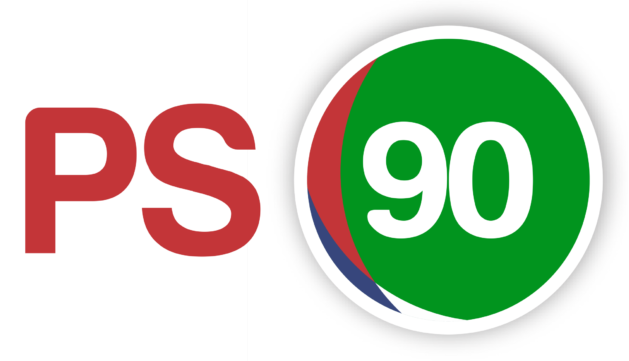
- Secretary-General: Gonzalo Civila
- Founder: Emilio Frugoni
- Founded: December 12, 1910; 115 years ago
- Headquarters: Soriano 1218, Montevideo, Uruguay
- Youth wing: Socialist Youth of Uruguay
- Ideology: Social democracy; Democratic socialism
- Political position: Centre-left to left-wing
- National affiliation: Broad Front
- Regional affiliation: São Paulo Forum
- International affiliation: Progressive Alliance
- Colors: Green

Website
- www.ps.org.uy

The Socialist Party of Uruguay (Spanish: Partido Socialista del Uruguay) is a centre-left political party in Uruguay. Founded in 1910, it is part of the Broad Front political coalition and the Progressive Alliance.

== History ==
The party was founded in 1910. Its main leader and spokesman was Dr Emilio Frugoni, a prominent advocate of socialist ideas in Uruguay. Its central organ was the newspaper Germinal, later superseded by El Sol.

The party was a member of the Labour and Socialist International between 1932 and 1940. In 1951 it joined the Socialist International, which it later left in 1960, and rejoined it in 1999. In 2017 the party once again withdrew from the Socialist International and joined the Progressive Alliance.

In 1971, the party was one of the founding members of the Broad Front, a left-wing coalition than won the 2004 election, 2009 election and 2014 election, also electing one of its affiliates, Tabaré Vázquez, as president.

It is currently led by Gonzalo Civila.

The Broad Front supported Daniel Martinez, a member of Socialist Party of Uruguay, for the 2019 general election. Martinez arrived first at the first turn, but was defeated in the run-off by Luis Alberto Lacalle Pou of the National Party (also endorsed by Colorado Party and Open Cabildo). For the first time in 15 years, the Broad Front was defeated at the polls. The party also lost its majority and in the Chamber of Representatives and the Senate, while remaining the largest party in the General Assembly.

== Election results ==
=== Presidential elections ===
Due to its membership in the Broad Front, the party has endorsed the candidates of other parties on several occasions. Presidential elections in Uruguay are held using a two-round system, the results of which are displayed below.

Election	Party candidate	Running mate	Votes	%	Votes	%	Result
Election	Party candidate	Running mate	First Round		Second Round		Result
1989	Liber Seregni	Danilo Astori	418,403	20.35%			Lost ✗
1994	Tabaré Vázquez	Rodolfo Nin Novoa	621,226	30.6%			Lost ✗
1999	Tabaré Vázquez	Rodolfo Nin Novoa	861,202	40.1%	982,049	45.9%	Lost ✗
2004	Tabaré Vázquez	Rodolfo Nin Novoa	1,124,761	51.7%			Elected ✓
2009	José Mujica	Danilo Astori	1,105,262	47.96%	1,197,638	54.63%	Elected ✓
2014	Tabaré Vázquez	Raúl Sendic	1,134,187	47.81%	1,226,105	53.48%	Elected ✓
2019	Daniel Martínez	Graciela Villar	949,376	40.49%	1,152,271	49.21%	Lost ✗
2024	Yamandú Orsi	Carolina Cosse	1,071,826	46.12%	1,196,798	52.08%	Elected ✓
