= Progressive Alliance (Uruguay) =

Political party in Uruguay

Progressive Alliance Alianza Progresista
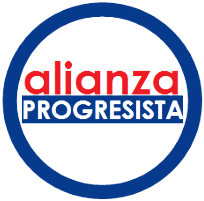
- Leader: Rodolfo Nin Novoa
- Founded: 1999; 26 years ago
- Headquarters: Montevideo
- Ideology: Social democracy Progressivism
- Political position: Centre-left
- National affiliation: Broad Front

Website
- www.alianza738.org.uy

The Progressive Alliance (Spanish: Alianza Progresista) is a social-democratic political party of Uruguay founded in 1999 by the former Vice President Rodolfo Nin Novoa, and since its foundation, it is part of the Frente Amplio.

In August 2009 the Progressive Alliance, Uruguay Assembly led by the then Vice President Danilo Astori and the New Space led by Senator Rafael Michelini joined forces to create the Liber Seregni Front, a political moderate sector within the Frente Amplio. The Christian Democratic Party is part of the Progressive Alliance.

In the last election the Progressive Alliance won one seat in the Chamber of Senators and other in the Chamber of Deputies taken by Pablo Pérez for Maldonado Department.

== Members ==
Its prominent members are current Senator Rodolfo Nin Novoa, former Minister of Tourism and Sport Héctor Lescano, former deputy Liliam Kechichian and Jorge Rodriguez.

== Election results ==
=== Presidential elections ===
Due to its membership in the Broad Front, the party has endorsed the candidates of other parties on several occasions. Presidential elections in Uruguay are held using a two-round system, the results of which are displayed below.

Election	Party candidate	Running mate	Votes	%	Votes	%	Result
Election	Party candidate	Running mate	First Round		Second Round		Result
1999	Tabaré Vázquez	Rodolfo Nin Novoa	861,202	40.1%	982,049	45.9%	Lost ✗
2004	Tabaré Vázquez	Rodolfo Nin Novoa	1,124,761	51.7%			Elected ✓
2009	José Mujica	Danilo Astori	1,105,262	47.96%	1,197,638	54.63%	Elected ✓
2014	Tabaré Vázquez	Raúl Sendic	1,134,187	47.81%	1,226,105	53.48%	Elected ✓
2019	Daniel Martínez	Graciela Villar	949,376	40.49%	1,152,271	49.21%	Lost ✗
2024	Yamandú Orsi	Carolina Cosse	1,071,826	46.12%	1,196,798	52.08%	Elected ✓

== See also ==
- Frente Amplio
- Uruguay Assembly
- New Space
- List of vice presidents of Uruguay
