= Liber Seregni Front =

Liber Seregni Front Frente Liber Seregni FLS
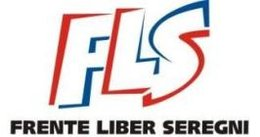
- Founded: August 2009
- Dissolved: August 2019
- Headquarters: Avenue 18 de Julio, 1995 Montevideo, Uruguay
- Ideology: Social democracy Progressivism; Democratic socialism Christian democracy
- Political position: Centre-left

Website
- www.fls.uy

The Liber Seregni Front (Spanish: Frente Liber Seregni) was the name of the centre-left faction inside the Frente Amplio which was created by Danilo Astori leader of Uruguay Assembly, Rafael Michelini leader of New Space and Rodolfo Nin Novoa, leader of Progressive Alliance, in August 2009, before the election. The group takes its name from Liber Seregni, founder of the Frente Amplio.

== General election, 2009 ==
In this election the FLS obtained five seats in the Senate taken by Ramón Fonticiella, Rafael Michelini, Rodolfo Nin Novoa, Carlos Baráibar and Susana Dalmás.
