= Uruguay Assembly =

Political party in Uruguay

Uruguay Assembly Asamblea Uruguay
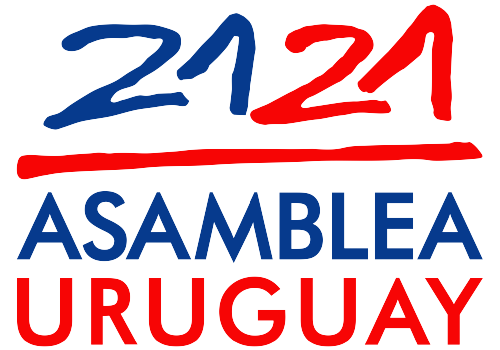
- Founded: 19 May 1994; 32 years ago
- Headquarters: Montevideo, Uruguay
- Ideology: Social liberalism Social democracy Progressivism
- Political position: Centre to centre-left
- National affiliation: Broad Front
- Regional affiliation: São Paulo Forum

Website
- www.2121.org.uy

The Uruguay Assembly (Asamblea Uruguay) is a social-democratic political party in Uruguay, and a member organisation of the Broad Front. It was founded in 1994 by former Vice President of Uruguay, Danilo Astori, who led the party from its foundation up to his death in 2023.

== History ==
Uruguay Assembly was founded in 1994 by Danilo Astori. Astori had been remarkable in his performance as an opposition leader against the government of Luis Alberto Lacalle. Many saw him as an interesting alternative to the leadership of the older Líber Seregni. Then, Astori met with various independent Broad Front militants, who also emerged from other Broad Front groups like Democracia Avanzada ("Democracy Advanced" or "Advanced Democracy"). The party was relatively unique for having emerged and achieved independent success as a faction within an existing coalition structure; it was only the second of Uruguay's political parties to do so (after Vertiente Artiguista). 1994, with Astori's influence running strong, the party received 39.4% of the votes.

During the second presidency of Julio María Sanguinetti, Uruguay Assembly maintained a constructive attitude, akin with the spirit of coalition government that created a favorable atmosphere for the nationalist Alberto Volonté. In fact, the party maintained a constant attitude of dialog with the Colorado Party, if sometimes it ended up voting contrary to party discipline with the rest of the Broad Front. Examples of this are the reform of social security initiated by the AFAP and the constitutional reforms of 1996. Furthermore, in 1996, it had the first president of the House of Deputies not from a traditional party, Carlos Baráibar.

It is part of the left-leaning Broad Front coalition but is considered more of a moderate party.

It was part of the Liber Seregni Front.

The party renewed its leadership in 2023.

== Members ==
- Danilo Astori
- Alberto Cid
- Enrique Pintado
- Carlos Baràibar
- Jorge Orrico

== Jota21 ==
Jota21: Jóvenes Organizados Trabajando en Asamblea (Organised Youth Working in Assembly) is the youth sector of Asamblea Uruguay.

== Election results ==
=== Presidential elections ===
Due to its membership in the Broad Front, the party has endorsed the candidates of other parties on several occasions. Presidential elections in Uruguay are held using a two-round system, the results of which are displayed below.

Election	Party candidate	Running mate	Votes	%	Votes	%	Result
Election	Party candidate	Running mate	First Round		Second Round		Result
1994	Tabaré Vázquez	Rodolfo Nin Novoa	621,226	30.6%			Lost ✗
1999	Tabaré Vázquez	Rodolfo Nin Novoa	861,202	40.1%	982,049	45.9%	Lost ✗
2004	Tabaré Vázquez	Rodolfo Nin Novoa	1,124,761	51.7%			Elected ✓
2009	José Mujica	Danilo Astori	1,105,262	47.96%	1,197,638	54.63%	Elected ✓
2014	Tabaré Vázquez	Raúl Sendic	1,134,187	47.81%	1,226,105	53.48%	Elected ✓
2019	Daniel Martínez	Graciela Villar	949,376	40.49%	1,152,271	49.21%	Lost ✗
2024	Yamandú Orsi	Carolina Cosse	1,071,826	46.12%	1,196,798	52.08%	Elected ✓

== See also ==
- Broad Front (Uruguay)
