= Sovereign Identity =

Sovereign Identity Identidad Soberana
- Abbreviation: IS
- Leader: Gustavo Salle
- President: María Canoniero Castagnola
- Founded: 9 November 2022
- Registered: 2 May 2023
- Headquarters: 2262 18 de Julio Avenue Montevideo
- Ideology: Nationalism; Conspiracy theorism; Sovereigntism; Identitarianism; Anti-establishment; Anti-globalism; Anti-vaccine; Anti-Zionism; Anti-freemasonry
- Political position: Far-right
- Colours: Blue; White; Yellow
- Chamber of Deputies: 2 / 99
- Senate: 0 / 30
- Intendencias: 0 / 19
- Mayors: 0 / 125

Website
- identidadsoberana.org

Sovereign Identity (Spanish: Identidad Soberana) is a far-right, anti-establishment political party in Uruguay. Founded in 2022, it is led by the lawyer and confrontational activist Gustavo Salle Lorier. The party entered the Uruguayan parliament for the first time after winning 2 seats in the Chamber of Representatives in the 2024 general election.

According to Salle and leading members, Sovereign Identity is neither left-wing nor right-wing, and it is not aligned with either of the country's two major political blocs, the Broad Front and the Republican Coalition. Salle himself has defined the General Assembly as "the den of the homeland-sellers", and has been described as an anti-establishment activist.

The party has appealed to some conspiracy theories such as that of the New World Order, that of the "kleptocorporatocracy" or government of the corporations, and those related to the COVID-19 pandemic, as well as the Judeo-Masonic conspiracy theory. It has also adopted a stance against vaccines and the 2030 Agenda for Sustainable Development Goals.

== Election results ==
=== Presidential elections ===
Election	Party candidate	Running mate	Votes	%	Votes	%	Result
Election	Party candidate	Running mate	First Round		Second Round		Result
2024	Gustavo Salle	María Canoniero	65,796	2.83%	—N/a	—N/a	Lost ✗

=== Chamber of Deputies and Senate elections ===
Election	Votes	%	Chamber seats	+/−	Senate seats	+/−	Position	Size
2024	65,796	2.83%	2 / 99	New	0 / 30	New	Opposition	▲4th
