= New Space (Uruguay) =

Political party in Uruguay

New Space Nuevo Espacio
- Leader: Rafael Michelini
- Founder: Rafael Michelini
- Founded: 6 August 1994; 30 years ago
- Headquarters: Eduardo Acevedo 1615 Montevideo, Uruguay
- Ideology: Social democracy Third Way; Progressivism
- Political position: Centre to centre-left
- National affiliation: Frente Amplio
- International affiliation: Socialist International

Website
- www.nuevoespacio.org.uy

New Space (Spanish: Nuevo Espacio) is a social democratic party in Uruguay.

== History ==
The party was founded in 1994 by Senator Rafael Michelini. It was born as a split of the centrist Party for the Government of the People (Partido por el Gobierno del Pueblo, PGB), whose leader was the former Vice-President Hugo Batalla, when the party decided to join the traditional liberal Colorado Party for the 1994 Uruguayan general election. "New Space" had originally been the name of an electoral alliance formed after the more centrist elements of the Broad Front had left the centre-left alliance, which they deemed too strongly dominated by the Marxist elements, in 1989 and included notably the PGB and the Christian Democratic Party (PDCU).

While the PDCU returned to the Broad Front in 1994, the New Space party ran separately, as the fourth force behind the two traditional ruling parties and the Broad Front. It obtained five seats in the Chamber of Deputies and one Senator. In 1999, the party was returned four deputies and its Senator. Michelini who ran as the party's presidential candidate won 4.4% of the vote. The party positioned itself in the political center and won most of its supporters among the lower-middle and lower classes.

In 2001, the New Space decided to re-join the Broad Front for the 2004 campaign. As a result, there was a new crack in the party's board. The Independent Party emerged, led by Deputy Pablo Mieres. The New Space has supported the governments of Presidents Tabaré Vázquez (2005–2010, 2015–2020) and José Mujica (2010–2015). In 2009, the New Space, alongside Uruguay Assembly and Progressive Alliance, founded the Liber Seregni Front as a moderate social democratic sub-group within the Broad Front.

The New Space party has been a member of the Socialist International since shortly after its foundation.

== Election results ==
=== Presidential elections ===
Due to its membership in the Broad Front, the party has endorsed the candidates of other parties on several occasions. Presidential elections in Uruguay are held using a two-round system, the results of which are displayed below.

Election	Party candidate	Running mate	Votes	%	Votes	%	Result
Election	Party candidate	Running mate	First Round		Second Round		Result
1994	Rafael Michelini	Héctor Pérez Pereira	104,773	5.2%			Lost ✗
1999	Rafael Michelini	Pablo Mieres	97,943	4.4%			Lost ✗
2004	Tabaré Vázquez	Rodolfo Nin Novoa	1,124,761	51.7%			Elected ✓
2009	José Mujica	Danilo Astori	1,105,262	47.96%	1,197,638	54.63%	Elected ✓
2014	Tabaré Vázquez	Raúl Sendic	1,134,187	47.81%	1,226,105	53.48%	Elected ✓
2019	Daniel Martínez	Graciela Villar	949,376	40.49%	1,152,271	49.21%	Lost ✗
2024	Yamandú Orsi	Carolina Cosse	1,071,826	46.12%	1,196,798	52.08%	Elected ✓
