= Orrico =

Orrico (Italian pronunciation: [orˈri.ko]) is an Italian surname. Notable people with the surname include:

- Carmine Orrico (1936–2020), original name of American actor John Saxon
- Corrado Orrico (born 1940), Italian football coach
- Jorge Orrico (born 1946), Uruguayan politician, actor and lawyer
- Miguel Orrico de los Llanos, Mexican politician, Governor of Tabasco (1955–1958)
- Nathalia Goyannes Dill Orrico (born 1986), Brazilian actress better known as Nathalia Dill
- Stacie Orrico (born 1986), American Christian pop singer

== See also ==
- Stacie Orrico (album)
- Ulrich
