= Jorge Orrico =

Uruguayan deputy, actor and lawyer (born 1946)

Dr. Jorge Orrico

member of the Chamber of Representatives of Uruguay
- In office March 1, 1995 – March 1, 2015 Serving with Danilo Astori

Personal details
- Born: 25 October 1946 (age 79) Montevideo, Uruguay
- Party: Frente Amplio
- Spouse: Cristina Martinez
- Profession: Lawyer

Jorge Omar Orrico Miraldi is a Uruguayan deputy, actor and lawyer.

== Biography ==
Jorge Orrico was born 25 October 1946 in Montevideo.

== Acting career ==
Orrico acted in theatre plays in the late 1970s and early 1980s. He also acted in the 2001 Uruguayan movie Estrella del Sur, directed by Luis Nieto.

== Political career ==
Orrico had an early start at the Colorado Party, but then quickly moved to the Broad Front when it was founded in 1971. He is one of the founders of Uruguay Assembly, a subdivision of the party that he started in 1994 with Danilo Astori.

In 2012 he was chosen President of the Chamber of Deputies of Uruguay.

== See also ==
- Danilo Astori
- Tabaré Vázquez
- Frente Amplio
- Asamblea Uruguay
