= 1914 Uruguayan Senate election =

Senate elections were held in Uruguay on 29 November 1914 to elect 6 of the 19 members of the Senate.

== Results ==
Party	Votes	%	Seats
Colorado Party	10,437	76.21	5
National Party	3,211	23.45	1
Socialist Party	47	0.34	0
Total	13,695	100.00	6
Source: Bottinelli et al.
