= 1999 Uruguayan referendum =

31 October 1999

Financial autonomy of the judiciary
For	43.09%
Against	56.91%

Directors of state-owned enterprises as deputies
For	38.06%
Against	61.94%

A double referendum was held in Uruguay on 31 October 1999 alongside general elections. Voters were asked two questions; whether they approved of two initiatives, one on the financial autonomy of the judiciary, and one on preventing directors of state-owned companies from becoming MPs. Both were rejected by voters.

== Initiatives ==
=== Judiciary ===
The referendum on the financial judiciary of the judiciary was put forward by the General Assembly after being approved by 41 of the 99 members of the Chamber of Deputies and 12 of the 30 members of the Senate. It would involve amending articles 220, 233 and 239 of the constitution.

=== Directors of state-owned companies ===
The referendum on directors of state-owned companies was also put forward by the General Assembly, where it was approved by 61 Deputies and 20 Senators.

== Results ==
=== Judiciary ===
Choice	Votes	%
For	949,935	43.09
Against	1,254,746	56.91
Total	2,204,681	100.00
Total votes	2,204,681	–
Registered voters/turnout	2,402,160	91.78
Source: Direct Democracy

=== Directors of state-owned companies ===
Choice	Votes	%
For	839,004	38.06
Against	1,365,677	61.94
Total	2,204,681	100.00
Total votes	2,204,681	–
Registered voters/turnout	2,402,160	91.78
Source: Direct Democracy
