= Fernando Pereira Kosec =

Uruguayan politician (born 1966)

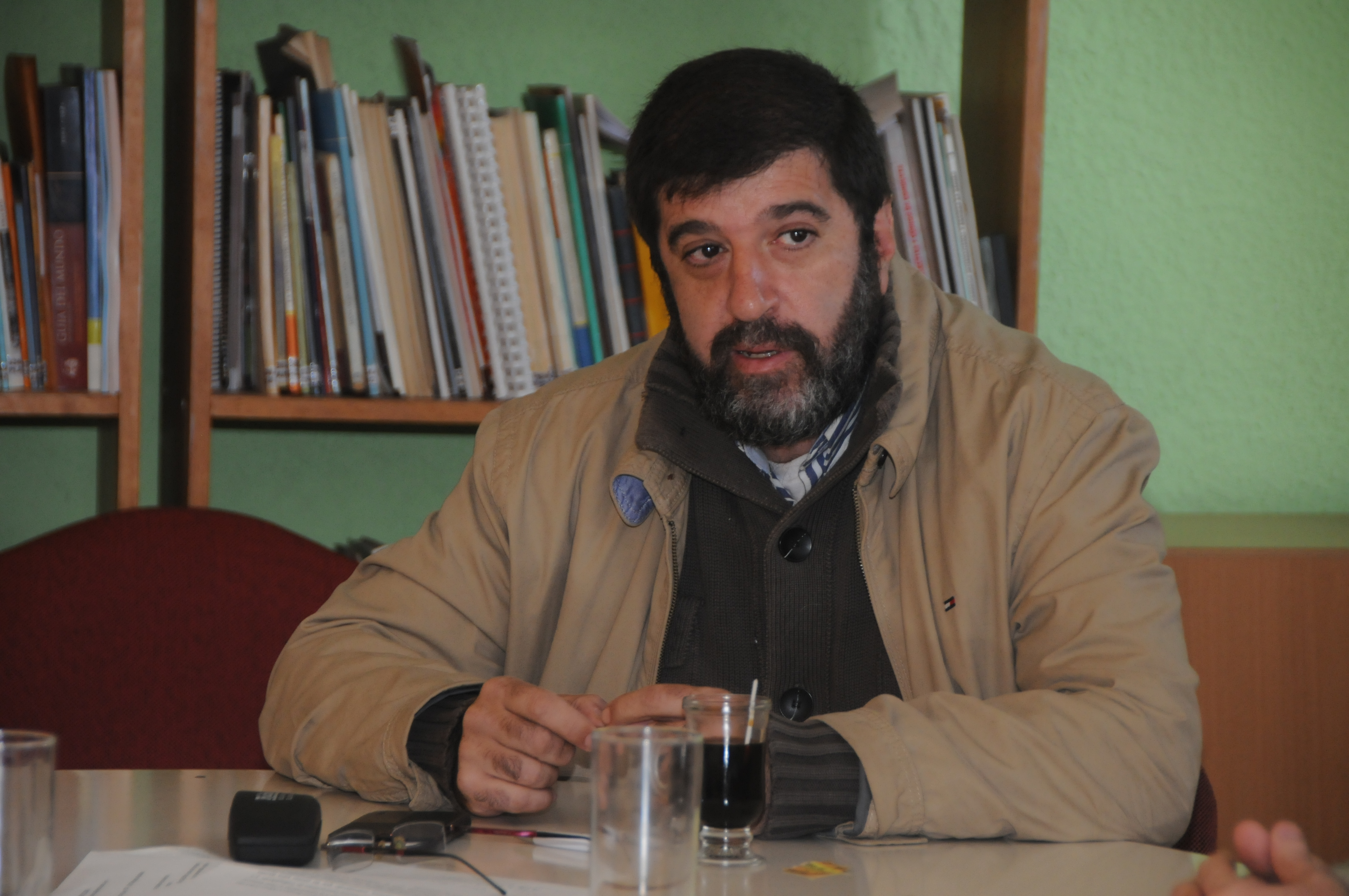
Fernando Pereira Kosec in 2015

Fernando Pereira Kosec (born 10 April 1966 in Montevideo) is a Uruguayan trade unionist and politician who is the current president of the leftist coalition party Broad Front. He was also the president of the national trade union center PIT-CNT from 2018 to 2021 and of the Uruguayan Teachers' Federation.

He is Catholic and has ties to the Christian left. "Fundamentally, I espouse Christian humanism and a conception of Juan Luis Segundo that has profoundly influenced those of us who believe in social activism as a means of transforming society. I am part of this very Uruguayan tradition of being Christian while sending your children to public, secular schools."
