= Broad Front Confluence =

Political party in Uruguay

Broad Front Confluence Confluencia Frenteamplista
- General Secretary: Oscar de los Santos
- Founder: Víctor Rossi
- Ideology: Socialism
- Political position: Left-wing
- National affiliation: Broad Front

The Broad Front Confluence (Spanish: Confluencia Frenteamplista) is a socialist political party in Uruguay. It is a member organisation of the Broad Front and the Progressive Alliance.
