= Carlos Baràibar =

Uruguayan politician

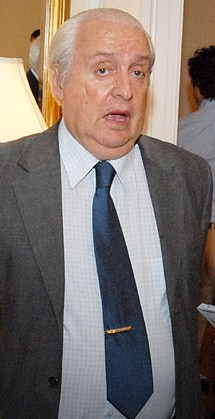
Carlos Baraibar

Carlos Baráibar (born in Montevideo in 1939) is a Uruguayan politician, member of the Broad Front-Uruguay Assembly, and former president of the Chamber of Representatives.

He became involved in politics in the 1960s, first with the Christian Democratic Youth, then with the Christian Democratic Party (PDC). He was secretary general of the Christian Democratic Youth of Latin America.

In 1971, he helped found the Broad Front and was elected to Chamber of Representatives. The party was banned under the dictatorship, then legalized in 1984.

He left the PDC in 1989 when it disaffiliated itself from the Broad Front. In 1994, he joined Uruguay Assembly alongside Danilo Astori. In 1994, he was elected as a representative. In 1997, he held the position of president of the Chamber of Representatives, a role held for the first time in history by a member of the Broad Front. He was re-elected as a representative in 1999 and 2004. He became a senator in 2005, replacing Danilo Astori, who had been appointed to the government. In 2011, he opposed the decriminalization of abortion, unlike the majority of other deputies and senators from the Broad Front.

He is married and has three children. He is a soccer fan.
