= Corriente de Izquierda =

Political party in Uruguay

The Leftist Current (Spanish: Corriente de Izquierda) is a leftist political party within the Broad Front political party which has held power in Uruguay since 2005.

In internal elections within Frente Ampilo, the party got 1.17% of the vote. Despite electoral failings, the Corriente de Izquierda has a very active base of party activists within the capital Montevideo.
