= Germinal (Uruguayan newspaper) =

Germinal was an Uruguayan weekly newspaper, the central organ of the Socialist Party of Uruguay, founded in 1921. In 1931 Germinal was superseded by a new Socialist Party newspaper, the daily El Sol.
