= Workers' Party (Uruguay) =

Workers' Party Partido de los Trabajadores
- Leader: Rafael Fernández
- Founded: 1984
- Headquarters: Montevideo, Uruguay
- Newspaper: Workers Tribune
- Youth wing: Revolutionary Youth
- Ideology: Trotskyism
- Political position: Left-wing to far-left
- International affiliation: Coordinating Committee for the Refoundation of the Fourth International
- Colors: Red
- Chamber of Deputies: 0 / 99
- Senate: 0 / 30

Party flag

Website
- www.pt.org.uy

The Workers' Party (Spanish: Partido de los Trabajadores) is a Trotskyist Uruguayan political party participating in the Coordinating Committee for the Refoundation of the Fourth International.

Its presence is testimonial. In the 2019 general election it obtained 1,387 votes.

In 2023 they reached an agreement with the Popular Unity and the Struggling Workers' Front, forming an electoral agreement called the Popular Unity - Workers' Front. The candidate for that front in 2024 was Gonzalo Martínez from the Popular Unity, with Andrea Revuelta from the Workers' Party as the running mate.

== Electoral history ==
=== Presidential elections ===
Election	Party candidate	Running mate	Votes	%	Result
Election	Party candidate	Running mate	First Round		Result
1989	Vital Andrada		310	0.02%	Lost ✗
1994	Vital Andrada		378	0.02%	Lost ✗
1999	Did not Participate				
2004	Rafael Fernández	María Luisa Suárez	513	0.02%	Lost ✗
2009	Did not Participate				
2014	Rafael Fernández	Andrea Revuelta	3,218	0.14%	Lost ✗
2019	Rafael Fernández	Andrea Revuelta	1,387	0.06%	Lost ✗
2024 (as part of UP-FT)	Gonzalo Martínez	Andrea Revuelta	10,102	0.41%	Lost ✗

=== Chamber of Deputies and Senate elections ===
Election	Votes	%	Chamber seats	+/-	Position	Senate seats	+/-	Position
1989	310	0.02%	0 / 99	Steady	▲7th	0 / 30	Steady	▲7th
1994	Did not Participate							
1999	Did not Participate							
2004	513	0.02%	0 / 99	Steady	▼8th	0 / 30	Steady	▼8th
2009	Did not Participate							
2014	3,218	0.14%	0 / 99	Steady	▲7th	0 / 30	Steady	▲7th
2019	1,387	0.06%	0 / 99	Steady	▼11th	0 / 30	Steady	▼11th
2024 (as part of UP-FT)	10,102	0.41%	0 / 99	Steady	▲8th	0 / 30	Steady	▲8th
