= Party for the Government of the People =

Spanish former political party

The Party for the Government of the People (PGP)—in Spanish: Partido por el Gobierno del Pueblo—was a social democratic political party in Uruguay. It was originally the Movimiento por el Gobierno del Pueblo. MGP was formed in 1962 by Zelmar Michelini, initially as a group inside the Partido Colorado.

MGP was a founding member of Frente Amplio (FA) (Broad Front).

Michelini was assassinated 20 May 1976.

MGP/PGP was part of the centrist branch of the Broad Front. In the 1984 election MGP was the sector of the Broad Front that received the largest number of votes. In 1989 PGP withdrew from the front. In 1994 it merged with Partido Colorado, but several of its legislators and members stayed out. Some formed Encuentro Progresista (Progressive Encounter) whereas others, led by Rafael Michelini (son of Zelmar Michelini), formed Nuevo Espacio (New Space).
