= 1989 Uruguayan general election =

General elections were held in Uruguay on 26 November 1989. They resulted in a clear win for the National Party, and victory for the Herrerismo-Renovación y Victoria presidential candidate, Luis Alberto Lacalle.

This was only the third time in the 20th century that the National Party won a general election. The incumbent Colorado Party was defeated.

== Results ==
Party	Presidential candidate	Votes	%	Seats			
Party	Presidential candidate	Votes	%	Chamber	+/–	Senate	+/–
National Party	Luis Alberto Lacalle	444,839	22.57	39	+4	12	+1
National Party	Carlos Julio Pereyra	218,656	11.10	39	+4	12	+1
National Party	Alberto Zumarán	101,046	5.13	39	+4	12	+1
National Party	al lema	1,449	0.07	39	+4	12	+1
National Party	Total	765,990	38.87	39	+4	12	+1
Colorado Party	Jorge Batlle	291,944	14.82	30	–11	9	–4
Colorado Party	Jorge Pacheco Areco	289,222	14.68	30	–11	9	–4
Colorado Party	Hugo Fernández Faingold	14,482	0.73	30	–11	9	–4
Colorado Party	al lema	1,316	0.07	30	–11	9	–4
Colorado Party	Total	596,964	30.29	30	–11	9	–4
Broad Front	Liber Seregni	418,403	21.23	21	0	7	+1
Party for the Government of the People	Hugo Batalla	177,453	9.01	9	New	2	New
Partido Verde Eto-Ecologista	Rodolfo Tálice	10,835	0.55	0	New	0	New
Righteous Movement	Bolívar Espínola	441	0.02	0	New	0	New
Workers' Party	Vital Andrada	310	0.02	0	0	0	0
Socialist Convergence	Nancy Espasandín	190	0.01	0	0	0	0
Total		1,970,586	100.00	99	0	30	0
Valid votes		1,970,586	95.83				
Invalid/blank votes		85,769	4.17				
Total votes		2,056,355	100.00				
Registered voters/turnout		2,319,022	88.67				
Source: FCU
