= Party of the Communes =

Political party in Uruguay

The Party of the Communes (Spanish: Partido de los Comunes) is a progressive political party in Uruguay. It is a member organisation of the Broad Front Progressive Encounter-New Majority and represents local administrations.
