= Luis Antonio Hierro López =

Uruguayan politician and diplomat

Luis Hierro López
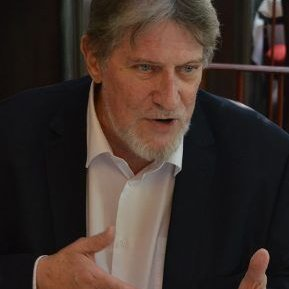
- Hierro López in 2017

13th Vice President of Uruguay
- In office 1 March 2000 – 1 March 2005
- President: Jorge Batlle
- Preceded by: Hugo Fernández Faingold
- Succeeded by: Rodolfo Nin Novoa

Ambassador of Uruguay to Peru
- In office 22 March 2021 – 7 December 2022
- Preceded by: Carlos Barros

Minister of the Interior of Uruguay
- In office 2 February 1998 – 9 October 1998
- President: Julio María Sanguinetti
- Preceded by: Didier Opertti
- Succeeded by: Guillermo Stirling

Senator of Uruguay
- In office 15 February 1995 – 15 February 2000

President of the Chamber of Representatives
- In office 1 March 1989 – 15 February 1990

Representative of Uruguay for Montevideo
- In office 14 February 1985 – 15 February 1995

Personal details
- Born: Luis Antonio Hierro López; 6 January 1947 (age 79) Montevideo, Uruguay
- Party: Colorado Party
- Spouse: Ligia Almitrán Penza
- Children: 4
- Education: Instituto de Profesores Artigas

Luis Antonio Hierro López (born June 6, 1947) is a Uruguayan politician and diplomat who served as the 13th vice president of Uruguay from 2000 to 2005 under Jorge Batlle.

Born into a political family, his father was Luis Hierro Gambardella, former Minister of Education and Culture and Parliamentarian, while his grandfather, Luis Hierro Rivera, was National Representative. Member of the Colorado Party, Hierro López served as National Representative, Senator and as Ministry of the Interior. He also served as President of the Chamber of Representatives the fifth session of the 42nd Legislature. In November 2020, he was approved by the Senate as Ambassador of Uruguay to the Republic of Peru, and on March 22, 2021 he delivered the credentials to President Francisco Sagasti.

== Vice President of Uruguay ==
Hierro López was Vice President of Uruguay from 2000 to 2005, under the Presidency of Jorge Batlle. Hierro was the thirteenth person to hold the office, which dates from 1934, when Alfredo Navarro became the inaugural holder.

== Subsequent events ==
He was succeeded in 2005 as Vice President by Rodolfo Nin Novoa.

While among the more experienced members of the Colorado Party to have held office, Hierro López has been somewhat eclipsed within the party by the activities of Pedro Bordaberry Herrán, whose 'Vamos Uruguay' grouping (see: Pedro Bordaberry#Formation of Vamos Uruguay) has drawn supporters away from older, more traditional figures such as Hierro López. Both of them are candidates for the Presidency for the Colorado Party in the next elections in 2009, but polls in late 2008, assumed to be broadly accurate, showed Bordaberry as the runaway favourite for the nomination, with Hierro trailing badly. Hierro has also suffered the loss of personal support from among former close party colleagues, including Ope Pasquet Iribarne, who in 2007 endorsed Pedro Bordaberry's 'Vamos Uruguay' grouping.

=== Resignation of Interior minister Tourné ===
In June 2009, Interior Minister Daisy Tourné, of the Broad Front Alliance, made a speech in which she referred to Hierro López as a 'donkey' and to former President Luis Alberto Lacalle de Herrera in terms widely regarded as obscenely indiscreet. The Minister's resignation followed the controversy which ensued.

=== Hierro provokes election tensions within the Colorado party ===
In an effort to bolster his candidacy, in June 2009, Hierro publicly attempted to discredit fellow candidate Pedro Bordaberry Herrán by suggesting that his surname was a hindrance to his bid for office; in a muted response, Bordaberry – a former government colleague of his – wished him well and recalled that Hierro himself had campaigned for him during municipal elections some years previously.

== See also ==
- Politics of Uruguay
- Colorado Party (Uruguay)
- List of political families#Uruguay
- Pedro Bordaberry#Colorado party Presidential front runner
- Pedro Bordaberry#Response to Hierro
- Ope Pasquet Iribarne#Former collaborator of Vice President López
- Daisy Tourné#Resignation

Political offices
Preceded by Hugo Fernández Faingold	Vice President of Uruguay; 2000-2005	Succeeded by Rodolfo Nin Novoa
