= Rodolfo Nin Novoa =

Uruguayan politician (1948)

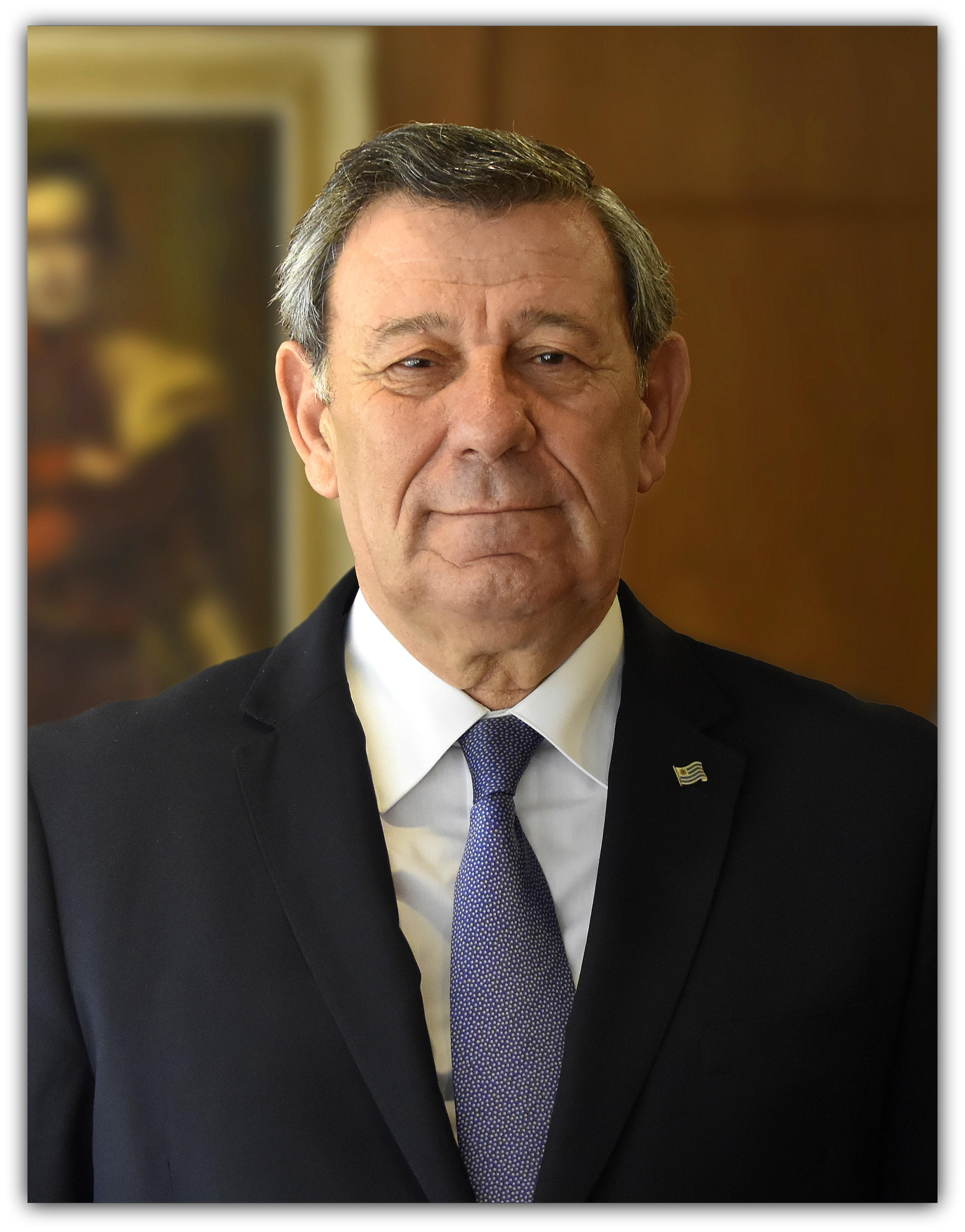
- Nin Novoa in 2015

Minister of Foreign Affairs
- In office 1 March 2015 – 1 March 2020
- President: Tabaré Vázquez
- Preceded by: Luis Almagro
- Succeeded by: Ernesto Talvi

14th Vice President of Uruguay
- In office 1 March 2005 – 1 March 2010
- President: Tabaré Vázquez
- Preceded by: Luis Antonio Hierro López
- Succeeded by: Danilo Astori

Personal details
- Born: 25 January 1948 (age 78) Montevideo, Uruguay
- Party: Progressive Alliance
- Other political affiliations: Broad Front
- Spouse: Patricia Damiani
- Children: 4

Rodolfo Nin Novoa (born 25 January 1948) is a Uruguayan politician who served as the 14th vice president of Uruguay from 2005 to 2010. He also served as Minister of Foreign Relations of Uruguay from 2015 to 2020 under Tabaré Vázquez. A member of the Broad Front, he is the leader of the Progressive Alliance faction.

== Background ==
Having originally received a traditional, Roman Catholic education, Nin was a member of the National Party and Intendant of Cerro Largo from 1985 until 1994. He joined the Frente Amplio (Broad Front) only in 1994. Among the issues with which Nin Novoa has been identified have been the successful efforts to prevent the privatization of water supplies and other services, amidst fears of its effects on users living in the interior of the country.

== Vice President of Uruguay ==
Nin Novoa was Vice President of Uruguay, serving under President Tabaré Vázquez, from 2005 to 2010. He succeeded Luis Antonio Hierro López in that office.

Vice President Nin's Chief of Staff, Gonzalo Nin Novoa, has received wide media exposure on various issues including defence procurement and expense claims. By the end of 2007 the Nin brothers were facing hostility from ostensible colleagues, including Juan Domínguez, and others, in the ruling Frente Amplio coalition.

=== Complex political associations ===
Nin Novoa's presence in the government of Tabaré Vázquez exemplified the highly diverse nature of the coalition of forces which it represented. He heads the Progressive Alliance, considered one of the rightmost groups of the Broad Front coalition and including the Christian Democratic Party. The Progressive Alliance forms part of the Liber Seregni Front along with Uruguay Assembly of Danilo Astori and New Space of Rafael Michelini, reflecting moderate, centre-left to centrist tendencies.

==== Relations with radical colleagues and opponents ====
Having been active in his earlier phase of political life in a conservative party in an area of the Uruguayan interior (Cerro Largo) not known for an overtly radical political culture, Nin Novoa later served in government alongside former Tupamaro radicals, the outlook and priorities of whom are said to differ significantly. Indeed, given his background, Nin Novoa has had to accommodate himself to being sometimes referred to as 'Comrade Nin Novoa', e.g., by Socialist Party spokesmen.

It would be fair to say, also, in the scheme of political associations and rivalries, that Nin Novoa's strongest critics would be numbered among his own political colleagues such as Juan Domínguez, rather than among members of the political opposition to the ruling Frente Amplio government.

== Foreign Minister of Uruguay ==
Nin Novoa became Foreign Minister of Uruguay in March 2015, at the beginning of the second term of office of President of Uruguay Tabaré Vázquez.

== See also ==
- (in Spanish) es:Rodolfo Nin Novoa
- List of foreign ministers in 2017
- List of ministers of foreign relations of Uruguay
- Politics of Uruguay
- Uruguayan political families
- Juan Domínguez (politician)#Re. the Nin brothers and defence procurement

Political offices
Preceded by Luis Antonio Hierro López	Vice President of Uruguay; 2005–2010	Succeeded by Danilo Astori
