= 1999 Uruguayan general election =

← 1994	31 October 1999; 29 November 1999 (runoff)	2004 →
- Registered: 2,402,160
- Turnout: 91.79% (first round) ▲0.41pp 91.84% (second round)
- Presidential election
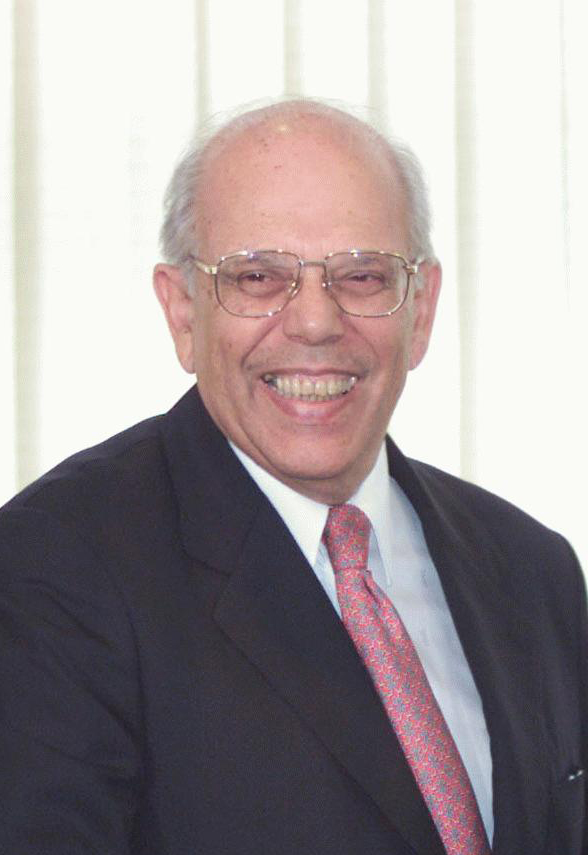

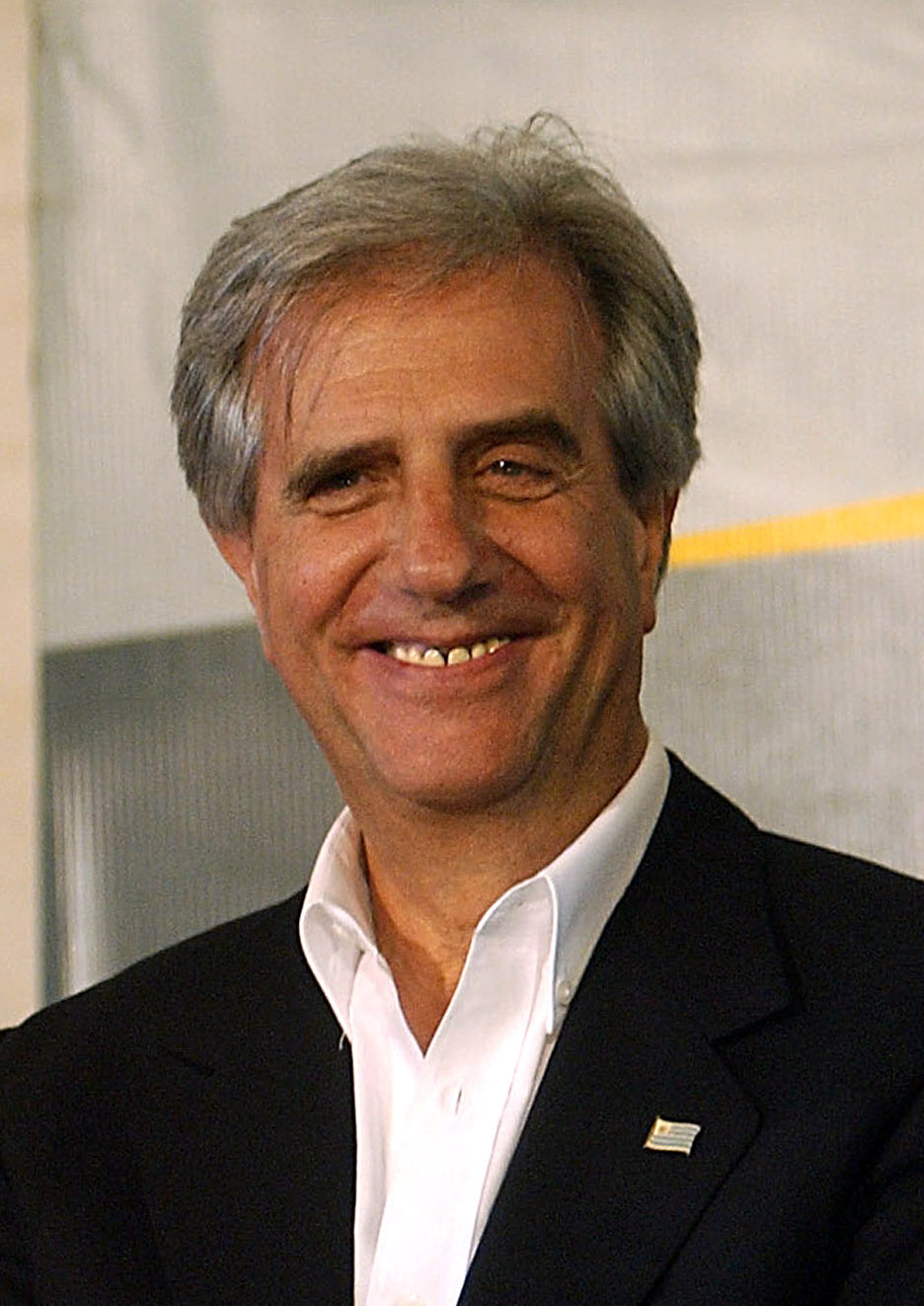
Nominee	Jorge Batlle	Tabaré Vázquez
Party	Colorado	Socialist
Alliance		Broad Front
Running mate	Luis Antonio Hierro López	Rodolfo Nin
Popular vote	1,158,708	982,049
Percentage	54.13%	45.87%
President before election
Julio María Sanguinetti
Colorado
Elected President
Jorge Batlle
Colorado
- Parliamentary election
Party	Leader	Vote %	Seats	+/–
Chamber
Broad Front	Tabaré Vázquez	40.11	40	+9
Colorado	Jorge Batlle	32.78	33	+1
National	Luis Alberto Lacalle	22.31	22	−9
New Space	Rafael Michelini	4.56	4	−1
Senate
Broad Front	Tabaré Vázquez	40.11	12	+3
Colorado	Jorge Batlle	32.78	10	−1
National	Luis Alberto Lacalle	22.31	7	−3
New Space	Rafael Michelini	4.56	1	0
This lists parties that won seats. See the complete results below.

General elections were held in Uruguay on 31 October 1999, alongside a double referendum, with a second round of the presidential election on 28 November. The elections were the first in Uruguay since World War I that were not dominated by the Colorado Party and the National Party. The Broad Front had begun gaining popularity in 1994, and had become a key player in Uruguayan politics by 1999.

The Broad Front–Progressive Encounter alliance became the largest faction in the General Assembly, winning the most seats in both the Senate and the Chamber of Deputies. In the presidential elections, Tabaré Vázquez of the Broad Front received the most votes in the first round, but was defeated by Jorge Batlle of the Colorado Party in the second round. The National Party suffered the worst showing in its history, falling to third place in both chambers behind the Broad Front and Colorados. In the second round, Batlle formed an alliance with the National Party; according to The New York Times, the traditional parties' decision to put aside their rivalry of over a century and a half helped Batlle win the presidency on his fifth attempt.

== Electoral system ==
Changes to the electoral law prior to the elections allowed third parties like the Broad Front a wider opportunity for participation. Parties were now required to hold primaries on the same day in April to elect a single presidential candidate; previously several candidates from a single party had been able to run for the presidency. The reforms also introduced the two-round system for the presidential election, with a candidate now required to receive over 50% of the vote to be elected in the first round, or face a run-off against the second-place candidate. Although the double simultaneous vote system (in which voters cast a single vote for the party of their choice for the Presidency, Senate and Chamber of Representatives) was retained, it prevented parties from submitting different lists.

The 30 members of the Senate were elected by proportional representation in a single nationwide constituency, whilst the 99 members of the Chamber of Representatives were elected by proportional representation in 19 multi-member constituencies based on the departments. Seats were allocated using the highest averages method.

== Primaries ==
The requirement to choose a single presidential candidate created tension in some parties. The National Party chose Luis Alberto Lacalle, who had been president from 1990 to 1995. The Colorado Party primaries were won by Jorge Batlle, whilst the Broad Front selected Tabaré Vázquez.

== Campaign ==
The Colorado Party spent the most on the campaign, spending the equivalent of US$11.1m ($3.1m in the primaries and $8m in the main election). The Broad Front spend $8m ($670,000 during the primaries and $7.4m during the main campaign) and the National Party $7m ($2m in the primaries and $5m during the main election). Other parties spent $500,000 during both stages of the elections.

== Results ==
Party	Presidential candidate	First round		Second round		Seats			
Party	Presidential candidate	Votes	%	Votes	%	Chamber	+/–	Senate	+/–
Broad Front–Progressive Encounter	Tabaré Vázquez	861,202	40.11	981,778	45.87	40	+9	12	+3
Colorado Party	Jorge Batlle	703,915	32.78	1,158,708	54.13	33	+1	10	–1
National Party	Luis Alberto Lacalle	478,980	22.31			22	–9	7	–3
New Space	Rafael Michelini	97,943	4.56			4	–1	1	0
Civic Union	Luis Pieri	5,109	0.24			0	0	0	0
Total		2,147,149	100.00	2,140,486	100.00	99	0	30	–1
Valid votes		2,147,149	97.38	2,140,486	97.03				
Invalid/blank votes		57,735	2.62	65,626	2.97				
Total votes		2,204,884	100.00	2,206,112	100.00				
Registered voters/turnout		2,402,160	91.79	2,402,135	91.84				
Source: Nohlen

=== Distribution by department ===
First round
Constituency	Broad Front			Colorado Party			National Party			New Space			Civic Union			Valid votes		Invalid votes	
Constituency	Votes	%	D	Votes	%	D	Votes	%	D	Votes	%	D	Votes	%	D	Votes	%	Votes	%
Artigas	10,907	22.2	–	19,753	40.2	1	16,595	33.8	1	658	1.3	–	35	0.1	–	48,158	98.1	948	1.9
Canelones	106,571	38.0	6	90,355	32.3	4	59,832	21.4	3	13,932	5.0	1	481	0.2	–	272,556	97.3	7,576	2.7
Cerro Largo	15,233	26.0	1	18,376	31.4	1	21,814	37.2	1	1,401	2.4	–	23	0.0	–	57,213	97.6	1,388	2.4
Colonia	25,198	29.2	1	28,197	32.6	1	25,639	29.7	1	4,860	5.6	–	83	0.1	–	84,509	97.8	1,907	2.2
Durazno	8,445	21.4	–	14,206	35.9	1	14,693	37.1	1	1,202	3.0	–	45	0.1	–	38,806	98.1	745	1.9
Flores	3,996	21.2	–	6,499	34.4	1	7,343	38.9	1	555	2.9	–	44	0.2	–	18,512	98.1	359	1.9
Florida	13,958	28.3	–	16,897	34.2	1	15,491	31.4	1	1,691	3.4	–	65	0.1	–	48,425	98.1	930	1.9
Lavalleja	9,457	20.5	–	17,805	38.5	1	15,954	34.5	1	1,627	3.5	–	63	0.1	–	45,213	97.9	975	2.1
Maldonado	30,501	34.6	2	30,485	34.5	1	20,168	22.8	1	4,199	4.8	–	226	0.3	–	86,094	97.5	2,171	2.5
Montevideo	484,441	50.6	23	278,684	29.1	13	118,569	12.4	5	51,071	5.3	3	3,126	0.3	–	941,066	98.4	15,723	1.6
Paysandú	30,921	40.9	2	20,654	27.3	1	19,119	25.3	–	2,506	3.3	–	143	0.2	–	74,024	97.9	1,606	2.1
Rio Negro	9,832	28.3	1	14,314	41.1	1	8,250	23.7	–	1,471	4.2	–	31	0.1	–	34,134	98.1	660	1.9
Rivera	13,083	18.9	–	28,095	40.6	1	24,418	35.3	1	1,435	2.1	–	68	0.1	–	67,484	97.6	1,674	2.4
Rocha	14,016	27.3	1	17,984	35.1	1	15,824	30.8	1	1,534	3.0	–	38	0.1	–	49,810	97.1	1,495	2.9
Salto	24,029	30.7	1	29,490	37.6	1	19,782	25.2	1	2,715	3.5	–	143	0.2	–	76,606	97.8	1,757	2.2
San Jose	19,990	30.4	1	19,622	29.8	–	21,704	33.0	1	2,370	3.6	–	213	0.3	–	64,303	97.7	1,515	2.3
Soriano	19,273	32.3	1	21,697	36.3	1	14,875	24.9	–	1,952	3.3	–	55	0.1	–	58,348	97.7	1,373	2.3
Tacuarembó	13,679	21.9	–	19,820	31.7	1	25,561	40.8	1	1,658	2.6	–	218	0.3	–	61,271	97.9	1,320	2.1
Treinta y Tres	7,672	22.4	–	10,982	32.1	1	13,349	39.0	1	1,106	3.2	–	9	0.0	–	33,457	97.7	773	2.3
Total	861,202	39.1	40	703,915	31.9	33	478,980	21.7	22	97,943	4.4	4	5,109	0.2	0	2,159,989	98.0	44,895	2.0
Source: Corte Electoral

Second round
Constituency	Colorado Party		Broad Front		Valid votes		Invalid votes	
Constituency	Votes	%	Votes	%	Votes	%		
Artigas	32,261	66.1	15,071	30.9	47,332	97.0	1,445	3.0
Canelones	147,912	52.8	123,663	44.1	271,575	96.9	8,781	3.1
Cerro Largo	36,759	62.9	19,561	33.5	56,320	96.3	2,151	3.7
Colonia	52,818	61.2	30,701	35.6	83,519	96.8	2,776	3.2
Durazno	27,140	68.8	11,024	28.0	38,164	96.8	1,266	3.2
Flores	12,881	68.5	5,384	28.6	18,265	97.2	534	2.8
Florida	30,235	61.4	17,377	35.3	47,612	96.6	1,666	3.4
Lavalleja	32,635	70.8	11,870	25.8	44,505	96.6	1,585	3.4
Maldonado	50,761	57.5	34,532	39.1	85,293	96.6	2,994	3.4
Montevideo	410,992	42.8	525,496	54.7	936,488	97.5	24,141	2.5
Paysandú	37,108	49.3	35,636	47.4	72,744	96.7	2,507	3.3
Rio Negro	21,030	60.8	12,365	35.8	33,395	96.6	1,187	3.4
Rivera	49,288	71.7	17,122	24.9	66,410	96.6	2,355	3.4
Rocha	29,759	58.0	19,255	37.5	49,014	95.5	2,298	4.5
Salto	47,379	60.7	28,358	36.3	75,737	97.0	2,380	3.0
San Jose	40,221	61.2	23,516	35.8	63,737	97.0	1,985	3.0
Soriano	34,432	57.8	23,161	38.9	57,593	96.7	1,946	3.3
Tacuarembó	42,486	68.2	17,658	28.3	60,144	96.5	2,180	3.5
Treinta y Tres	22,611	66.3	10,028	29.4	32,639	95.7	1,449	4.3
Total	1,158,708	52.5	981,778	44.5	2,140,486	97.0	65,626	3.0
Source: Corte Electoral

== Documentary ==
- The 1999 election is portrayed at Jorge Batlle: entre el cielo y el infierno, a 2024 documentary directed by Federico Lemos.
