= 1994 Uruguayan general election =

General elections were held in Uruguay on 27 November 1994, alongside a double referendum. The result was a narrow victory for the Colorado Party, which won the most seats in the Chamber of Deputies and the Senate and received the most votes in the presidential election.

Tabaré Vázquez of the Broad Front received the most votes of any presidential candidate. However, former president Julio Maria Sanguinetti returned to office by virtue of the Colorados receiving the most votes of any party. Under the multi-candidate Ley de Lemas system in effect at the time, the highest-finishing candidate of the party that won the most votes was elected president. Vázquez finished just 12,100 fewer votes than the combined vote for the runner-up National Party, even though he won over 121,000 more votes than Sanguinetti. At the time, this was the best showing for a third party since the presidential system was reinstituted with the 1967 constitution.

They were the last presidential elections conducted under the Ley de Lemas system, which had been used for much of the 20th century and had been reinstituted in 1967. In 1996 a referendum amended the constitution to restrict each party to a single presidential candidate, effective from the 1999 elections.

== Results ==
Results of the 1994 Uruguayan presidential election

Party	Presidential candidate	Votes	%	Seats			
Party	Presidential candidate	Votes	%	Chamber	+/–	Senate	+/–
Colorado Party	Julio María Sanguinetti	500,767	24.68	32	+2	11	+2
Colorado Party	Jorge Batlle Ibáñez	102,551	5.05	32	+2	11	+2
Colorado Party	Jorge Pacheco Areco	51,936	2.56	32	+2	11	+2
Colorado Party	Jorge Barreiro	227	0.01	32	+2	11	+2
Colorado Party	al lema	947	0.05	32	+2	11	+2
Colorado Party	Total	656,428	32.35	32	+2	11	+2
National Party	Alberto Volonté	301,698	14.87	31	–8	10	–2
National Party	Juan Andrés Ramírez	264,258	13.02	31	–8	10	–2
National Party	Carlos Julio Pereyra	65,666	3.24	31	–8	10	–2
National Party	al lema	1,762	0.09	31	–8	10	–2
National Party	Total	633,384	31.21	31	–8	10	–2
Broad Front–Progressive Encounter	Tabaré Vázquez	621,226	30.61	31	+10	9	+2
New Space	Rafael Michelini	104,773	5.16	5	–4	1	–1
Partido Verde Eto-Ecologista	Rodolfo Tálice	5,498	0.27	0	0	0	0
Party of the Sun	Mabel Portillo	2,258	0.11	0	New	0	New
Civic Union	Luis Pieri	2,063	0.10	0	New	0	New
Blue Party	Roberto Canessa	1,645	0.08	0	New	0	New
Party for Social Security	Elías Yaffalian	828	0.04	0	New	0	New
Workers' Party	Juan Vital Andrada	378	0.02	0	0	0	0
Eastern Alliance	Federico Silva Ledesma	333	0.02	0	New	0	New
Righteous Movement	Bolívar Espínola	161	0.01	0	0	0	0
Democratic Labour Party	Pompeyo Giansanti	120	0.01	0	New	0	New
Republican Party	Ademar Álvarez Franco	117	0.01	0	New	0	New
Progressive Movement	Elías Perdomo	69	0.00	0	New	0	New
Total		2,029,281	100.00	99	0	31	+1
Valid votes		2,029,281	95.31				
Invalid/blank votes		99,964	4.69				
Total votes		2,129,245	100.00				
Registered voters/turnout		2,330,154	91.38				
Source: Electoral Court
