= Raúl Fernando Sendic Rodríguez =

Uruguayan politician (born 1962)

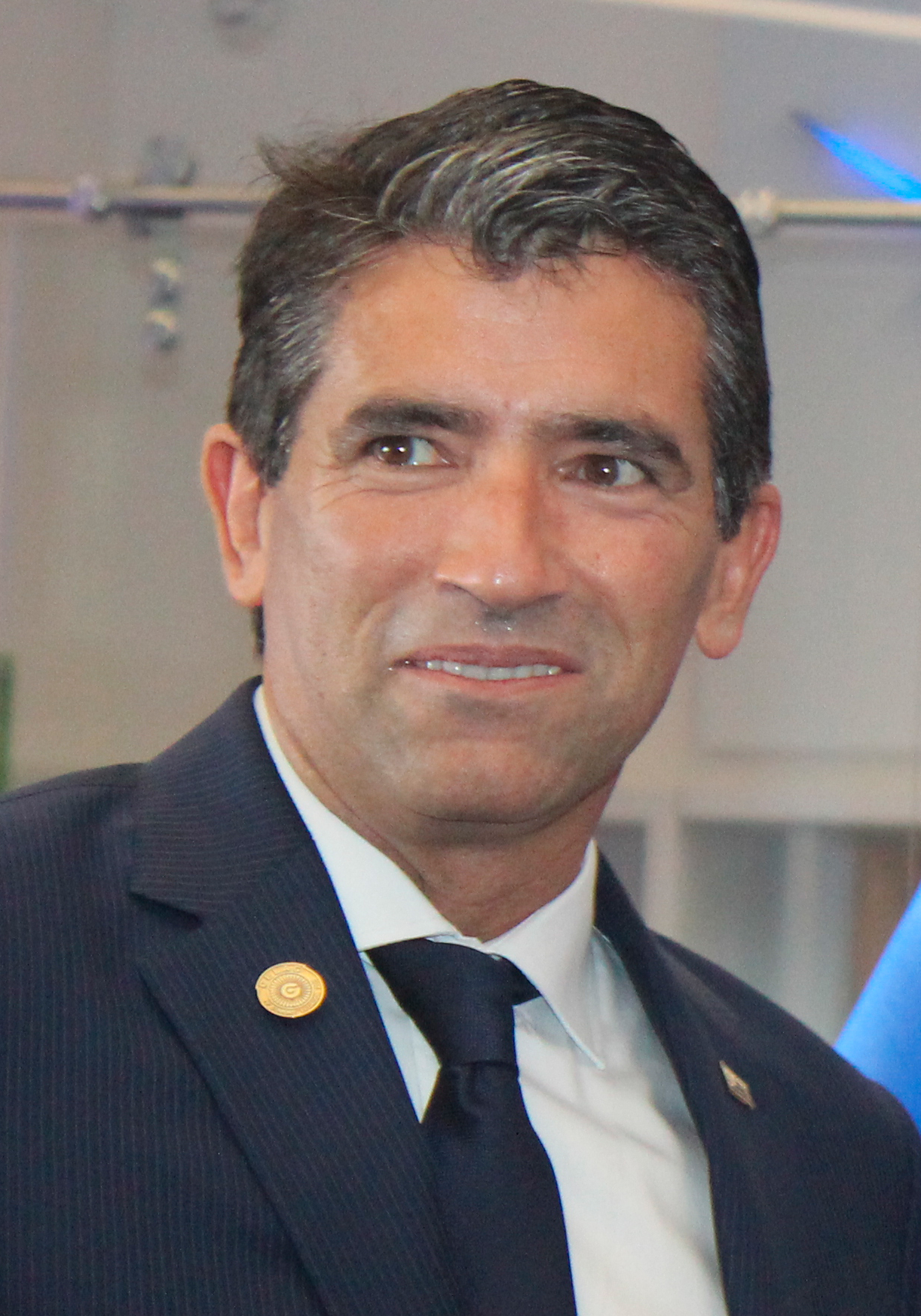
- Sendic in 2016

16th Vice President of Uruguay
- In office 1 March 2015 – 13 September 2017
- President: Tabaré Vázquez
- Preceded by: Danilo Astori
- Succeeded by: Lucía Topolansky

Personal details
- Born: Raúl Fernando Sendic Rodríguez; 29 August 1962 (age 63) Paysandú, Uruguay
- Party: Broad Front
- Parent(s): Nilda Rodríguez; Raúl Sendic
- Occupation: Politician

Raúl Fernando Sendic Rodríguez (born 29 August 1962) is a Uruguayan politician. He was the 16th vice president of Uruguay from 1 March 2015 to 13 September 2017.

== Family background and early life ==
Sendic was born in Paysandú, Uruguay in 1962; his family background was strongly politically ideological. Sendic's mother was Nilda Rodríguez and his father was Raúl Sendic, the leader of the Tupamaros- National Liberation Movement, an armed group in Uruguay.

Sendic grew up in Uruguay, visiting his father in prison, then moved to Cuba from 1980 to 1984, and traveled to Switzerland, France, and Brazil before — in a pattern followed by many exiles from the civilian-military administration of 1973 to 1985 — returning to Uruguay and continuing to be closely identified with exiles whose ideas were forged during their political conflicts with the military and subsequent exile.

== Education ==
Sendic has declared that he studied medicine at the University of Havana, in Cuba, for five years (1980 to 1984 inclusive) without finishing the degree. He has also claimed to have completed a short course on human genetics for future teachers.

In February 2016, Sendic's educational credentials became the subject of controversy, as his official biographies list him as having a degree in human genetics but no document that supports this claim has appeared.

== Political career ==
On his return to Uruguay, Sendic became politically active in the March 26 Movement. Following his loss in the election of 2004, Sendic helped form the electoral list "Compromiso Frenteamplista, lista 711".

Sendic served as a representative in the National Congress for a five year term from 2000 to 2005. Sendic failed to gain a second term in the elections of 2004.

Raúl Sendic served on the board of directors, as vice-president, and as president of ANCAP, the Uruguayan national petroleum monopoly. He was named to the board in 2005 and was vice president of ANCAP in 2007. He was president of ANCAP from 2008 to 2013, except during his stint in the government in 2009–2010.

=== Minister of Industry, Energy and Mining ===
From 2009 to 2010, Sendic served as Minister of Industry, Energy, and Mining in the last part of the Frente Amplio Government of President of Uruguay Tabaré Vázquez.

=== Vice President of Uruguay ===
For a number of years prior to the Uruguayan presidential elections of 2014, Sendic had been mentioned by former President of Uruguay Tabaré Vázquez as a possible running mate in his attempt at winning a second term of office. To this ticket Sendic was seen as bringing an energetic ideological commitment and a youthful zest, among an aging Broad Front leadership; subsequent events were to suggest that such hopes were premature. The Vázquez-Sendic ticket was successful in the elections of late 2014.

On 1 March 2015, Sendic took office as Vice President of Uruguay. While a relatively youthful Vice President, he was noted for his high profile attempts to keep alive ideological and family grievances from violent events 40 years previously.

== Ideology ==
Sendic's ideological background is social democrat.

== Controversies ==
=== ANCAP stewardship ===
In the first months of the second presidency of Tabaré Vázquez in 2015, the financial situation of the state owned oil monopoly ANCAP, for which Sendic had exercised responsibility, was discovered to be dire. On 4 August 2015, the Senate of Uruguay voted to form an investigatory committee to elucidate the causes and find if there was any illegal activity in the management of the company between 2000 and 2015. At the end of 2015, the government presented legislation to refinance the state owned oil monopoly ANCAP and forgive a debt of around $622 million, the largest capitalization in the history of the country.

The role of Sendic in the management of ANCAP during his tenure was widely criticized both by journalists and by opposition politicians.

Sendic never admitted to having any responsibility for the situation blaming instead the monetary policy of the government of which he himself had formed a part in 2009 and 2010, and blaming the Minister of Economy, saying it prevented him from further raising prices to account for new expenses.

=== Claimed Cuban educational degree ===
Sendic's official web pages claim he received a degree in 'Human Genetics' from the University of Havana, Cuba, adding he received a gold medal. Sendic also identified himself as 'Lic. Raúl Sendic' in official government documents, in interviews, and in the official annual reports of the state owned petroleum monopoly, ANCAP.

In an interview with the Uruguayan newspaper El Observador, on 24 February 2016, Sendic admitted that he never received a degree in 'Human Genetics'. In the following days, Sendic reiterated his claim to have received a degree and stated that he had asked for documents to support his claim from Cuba. However, Sendic did not produce any documents proving his educational claims.

An independent effort to find documents related to Sendic's education failed to find any record of his studies. An Uruguayan woman, Florencia Carballo, who visited Havana, Cuba, was widely reported to have made enquiries regarding university records of Sendic's claimed studies. These enquiries were unsuccessful, but Carballo was subsequently criticized by followers of the Vice President for supposedly being a supporter of the opposition; Carballo in turn claimed that her enquiry had simply been in order to try to establish the facts surrounding the much publicized claims regarding the Vice President's purported studies.

=== Zambia delegation ===
In 2016 Sendic's leadership at public expense of a 12-person parliamentary delegation to Zambia was called into question; Uruguay being a small country and Zambia being a poor country, Sendic's judgment of leading such a large, taxpayer-funded delegation was criticized.

=== Use of government-funded credit card for personal purchases ===
In the summer of 2017, misgivings about Sendic's record of long term use of a government funded credit card for personal use was expressed. A background factor to this controversy was the contrasting reputation of former President of Uruguay José Mujica for personal economy and austerity.

In September 2017 a summons to Sendic to a Broad Front hearing, which he attended, failed to resolve these issues, the momentum of which also related to a broader sense of perceived embarrassment among the Broad Front surrounding Sendic's tenure of office.

== Resignation ==
After months of uncertainty and a political scandal, and pressured increasingly by his own Broad Front party colleagues to give account for various perceived failures, Sendic resigned in September 2017, claiming personal reasons. By 2017, it was reported that there was a growing gap between the Marxist revolutionary rhetoric of some of the historic leaders of the Broad Front and the pragmatic, market oriented policies espoused by Broad Front governments. Sendic's resignation led to speculation about possibly changing prospects for a likely Broad Front candidate for President in 2019. Sendic was the first Vice President of Uruguay to resign since 1973, when Jorge Sapelli stepped down from the government of President of Uruguay Juan Maria Bordaberry, in protest at the latter's coup-d'état.

In March 2018, followings moves to put Sendic under judicial investigation, former President of Uruguay José Mujica made public statements regarding the past conduct of Sendic while heading ANCAP (Uruguay) and regarding Sendic's political prospects. These statements were significant for both their unusual strength — Sendic was judged to be 'a political corpse' — and their provenance from a former head of state.

== See also ==
- List of political families#Uruguay
- Raúl Sendic#Death and legacy
- Jorge Sapelli#June 1973 resignation
- ANCAP (Uruguay)
- Broad Front (Uruguay)#Ideology
- March 26 Movement

Political offices
Preceded by Danilo Astori	Vice President of Uruguay; 2015–2017	Succeeded by Lucía Topolansky
