= Tabaré Vázquez =

President of Uruguay (2005–2010; 2015–2020)

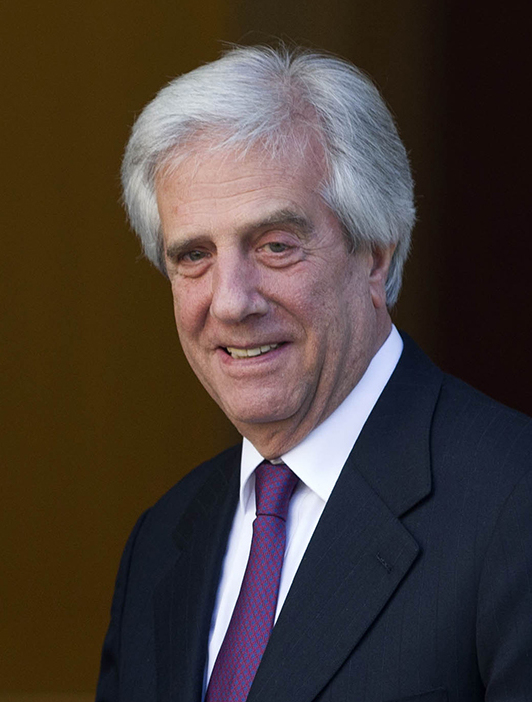
- Vázquez in 2016

39th and 41st President of Uruguay
- In office 1 March 2015 – 1 March 2020
- Vice President: Raúl Sendic (2015–2017); Lucía Topolansky (2017–2020)
- Preceded by: José Mujica
- Succeeded by: Luis Lacalle Pou
- In office 1 March 2005 – 1 March 2010
- Vice President: Rodolfo Nin
- Preceded by: Jorge Batlle
- Succeeded by: José Mujica

President pro tempore of UNASUR
- In office 1 March 2015 – 23 April 2016
- Preceded by: José Mujica
- Succeeded by: Nicolás Maduro

Intendant of Montevideo
- In office 5 May 1990 – 5 May 1994
- Preceded by: Eduardo Fabini Jiménez
- Succeeded by: Tabaré González

Personal details
- Born: Tabaré Ramón Vázquez Rosas; 17 January 1940 Montevideo, Uruguay
- Died: 6 December 2020 (aged 80) Montevideo, Uruguay
- Resting place: Cementerio de La Teja, Montevideo
- Party: Socialist Party of Uruguay
- Other political affiliations: Broad Front
- Spouse: María Auxiliadora Delgado (m. 1964; died 2019)
- Children: 4
- Education: University of the Republic
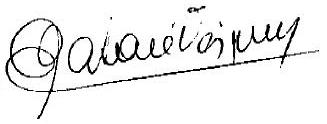
- Signature

Tabaré Ramón Vázquez Rosas (Spanish pronunciation: [taβaˈɾe raˈmom ˈbaskes ˈrosas]; 17 January 1940 – 6 December 2020) was a Uruguayan politician and oncologist who served as the 39th and 41st President of Uruguay from 2005 to 2010 and from 2015 to 2020. During his political career, Vázquez was a member of the Broad Front coalition. Before his first presidential term, Vázquez was president of the Club Progreso team and made two unsuccessful presidential bids in 1994 and 1999. He served as Intendant of Montevideo between 1990 and 1994 shortly before his first presidential campaign.

Vázquez was first elected president on 31 October 2004 and took office on 1 March 2005. He was the first socialist president of the country. His first presidency was remembered for his diplomatic relationships with Brazil and Argentina while being criticized by his party over his anti-abortion views. He strengthened the unions and improved Uruguay's social services. After leaving the presidency in 2010, Vázquez successfully ran for a second term in 2014. After leaving office for a second time in March 2020, he later died of lung cancer in December of that year at the age of 80.

== Early life ==
Vázquez was born in the neighbourhood of La Teja, Montevideo on 17 January 1940, the fourth child of Héctor Vázquez, a worker of ANCAP, and Elena Rosas. He had Galician ancestry; his grandparents were originally from Ourense and Santiago de Compostela. He studied medicine at the Universidad de la República Medical School, graduating as an oncologist in 1972. In 1976, he received a grant from the French government, allowing him to obtain additional training at the Gustave Roussy Institute in Paris.

== Early career and Intendant of Montevideo ==
Vázquez, an avid football fan, was president of the Club Progreso team from 1979 to 1989.

From 1990 to 1995, Vázquez was the Frente Amplio coalition's first Intendant of Montevideo. In that post, he carried out the functions of both the mayor of the city and governor of the department.

In 1994, he made an unsuccessful run for president as the Frente Amplio candidate. He actually finished with the most votes of the candidates in the field, more than 120,000 votes ahead of the next-highest vote-getter, former president Julio Maria Sanguinetti of the Colorado Party. However, under the multi-candidate Ley de Lemas system then in effect, Sanguinetti won the election, since he was the highest-finishing candidate of the party winning the most votes. Still, Vázquez turned in the best showing of a third-party candidate since the restoration of the presidential system in 1967; he only had 12,100 fewer votes than the combined vote of the second-place National Party.

In 1996, he was elected leader of the Frente Amplio, replacing the historic leader of the left-wing coalition, Líber Seregni. He ran again unsuccessfully for president in 1999. In the first election held after Uruguay scrapped the Ley de Lemas system, he led the field in the first round, with 40.1 percent of the vote. He lost the runoff to Colorado candidate Jorge Batlle, taking 45.9 percent of the vote.

== First presidency of Uruguay (2005–2010) ==
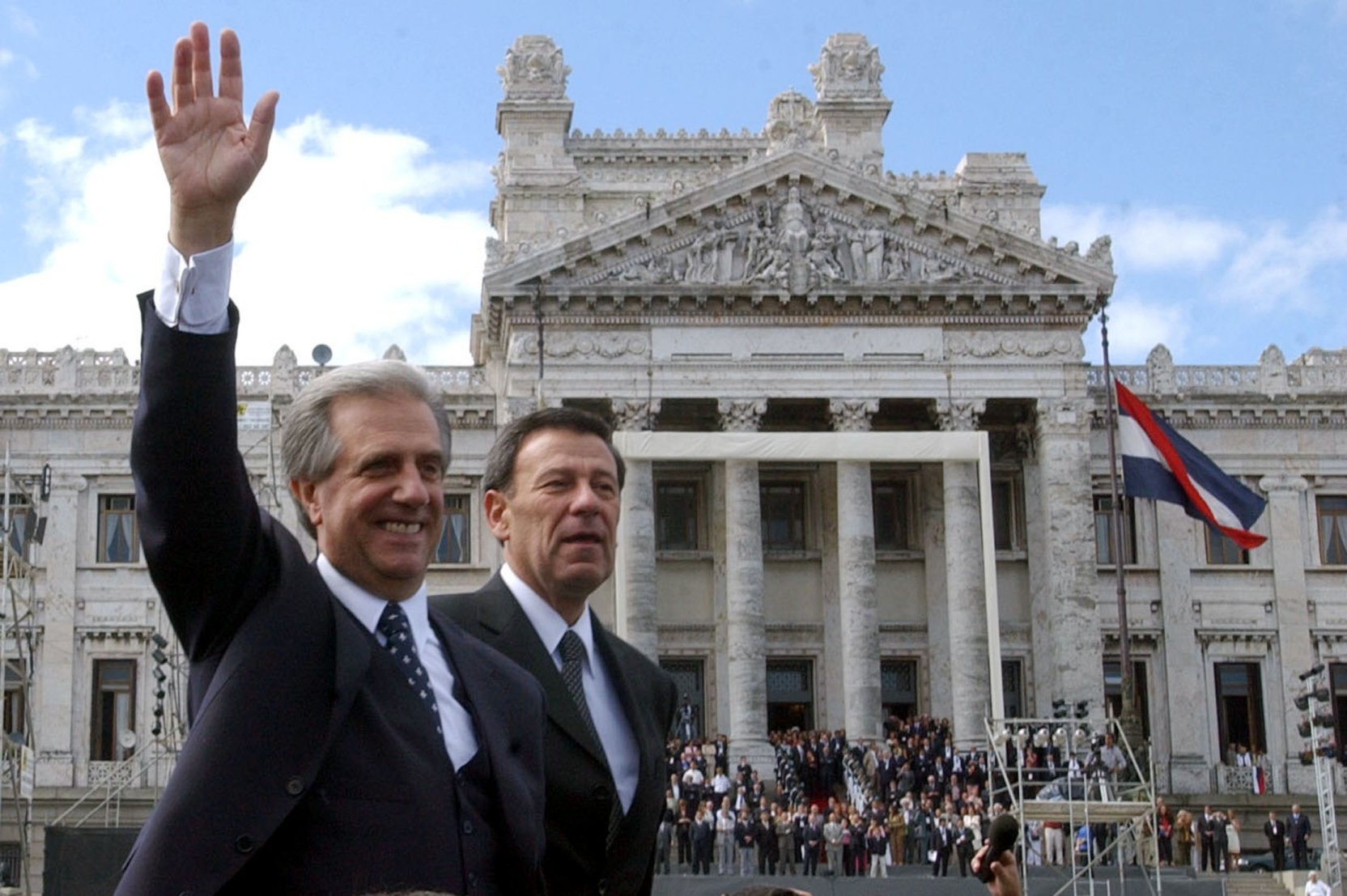
President Vázquez with Vice President Rodolfo Nin Novoa, in his inauguration ceremony in 2005

In the 2004 elections, he won 50.45% of the valid votes, enough to win the presidency in a single round. He became the country's first president from a left-wing party, and thus the first one since the 1830s who was not a member of the National (Blanco) or Colorado parties. He also had the support of the President of Brazil, Luiz Inácio Lula da Silva, likewise a centre-left democratic socialist.

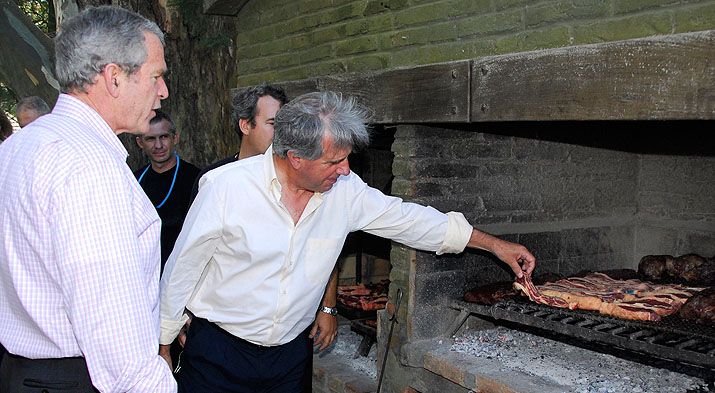
Vázquez welcomes George W. Bush, with asado a la parrilla in 2007

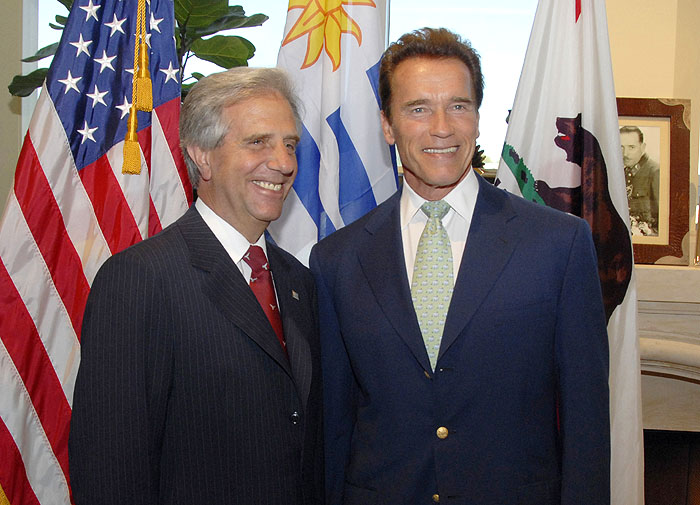
Vázquez with Arnold Schwarzenegger in 2007

Among the most complex issues that dominated his administration was an ongoing conflict with Argentina over potential contamination from pulp mills being built on the Uruguayan side of the Uruguay River. He even asked Bush for help in the event of an armed conflict with Argentina.

Vázquez was the first President of Uruguay to visit New Zealand and South Korea, and he established contacts with other countries in Southeast Asia. While he maintained cordial relations with the United States, hosting U.S. President George W. Bush, Vázquez did not sign Bush's failed Free Trade Area of the Americas.

This visit attracted a measure of censure from the opposition, from Pedro Bordaberry and others, who were critical of Vázquez for having chosen to be in Cuba during a commemoration – which Vázquez himself initiated – for the victims of the 1973–1985 dictatorship; Bordaberry's father, Juan María Bordaberry, established the dictatorship with a 1973 decree dissolving Congress.

In 2007 the loading of Iranian arms onto a Uruguayan Navy vessel visiting Venezuela, in contravention of a UN-sponsored arms embargo, provoked international comment. The domestic controversy regarding this event was centred on protests against Vázquez's Government by the opposition National Party.

In June 2008 President Vázquez visited Cuba. While in Cuba, Vázquez and the Presidential party engaged in a number of high-profile events, including a summit with President Raúl Castro.

In June 2009 President Vázquez, who had been courting diplomatically the Bolivian President Evo Morales, announced his support for the delisting of coca leaves from the category of a "dangerous drug".

In February 2010 the Vázquez Government was cooperating with an investigation to explain how two Northrop F-5E jet engines valued at many millions of U.S. dollars had surfaced in Uruguay.

Tabaré Vázquez and his government have pursued a centre-left economic policy. Between 2005 and 2008, the minimum wage rose from 1,350 pesos to 4,150 pesos ($70 to $200), while poverty fell from 30.9 per cent to 12.7 per cent of the population and unemployment from 11.3 per cent to 7 per cent.

=== Official visits ===
This is a list of official visits abroad made by Vázquez during his first term in office, from 1 March 2005 to 1 March 2010:

==== 2008 ====
#	Location	Date	Purpose
1	Cuba Havana	18–22 June	Visit with a delegation for bilateral talks, a visit to the University of Havana, and the signing of several agreements on health, education, energy, agriculture, and sport.
2	Israel Jerusalem	25–26 August	Visit with a delegation of ministers and diplomats to meet Israeli Prime Minister Ehud Olmert, sign a bilateral cooperation agreement between both countries, visit sites commemorating the Holocaust, and meet Uruguayans residing in Israel, among other events.

== Popularity ==
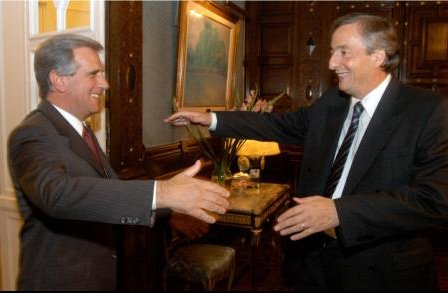
Vázquez with Argentine president Néstor Kirchner in May 2005

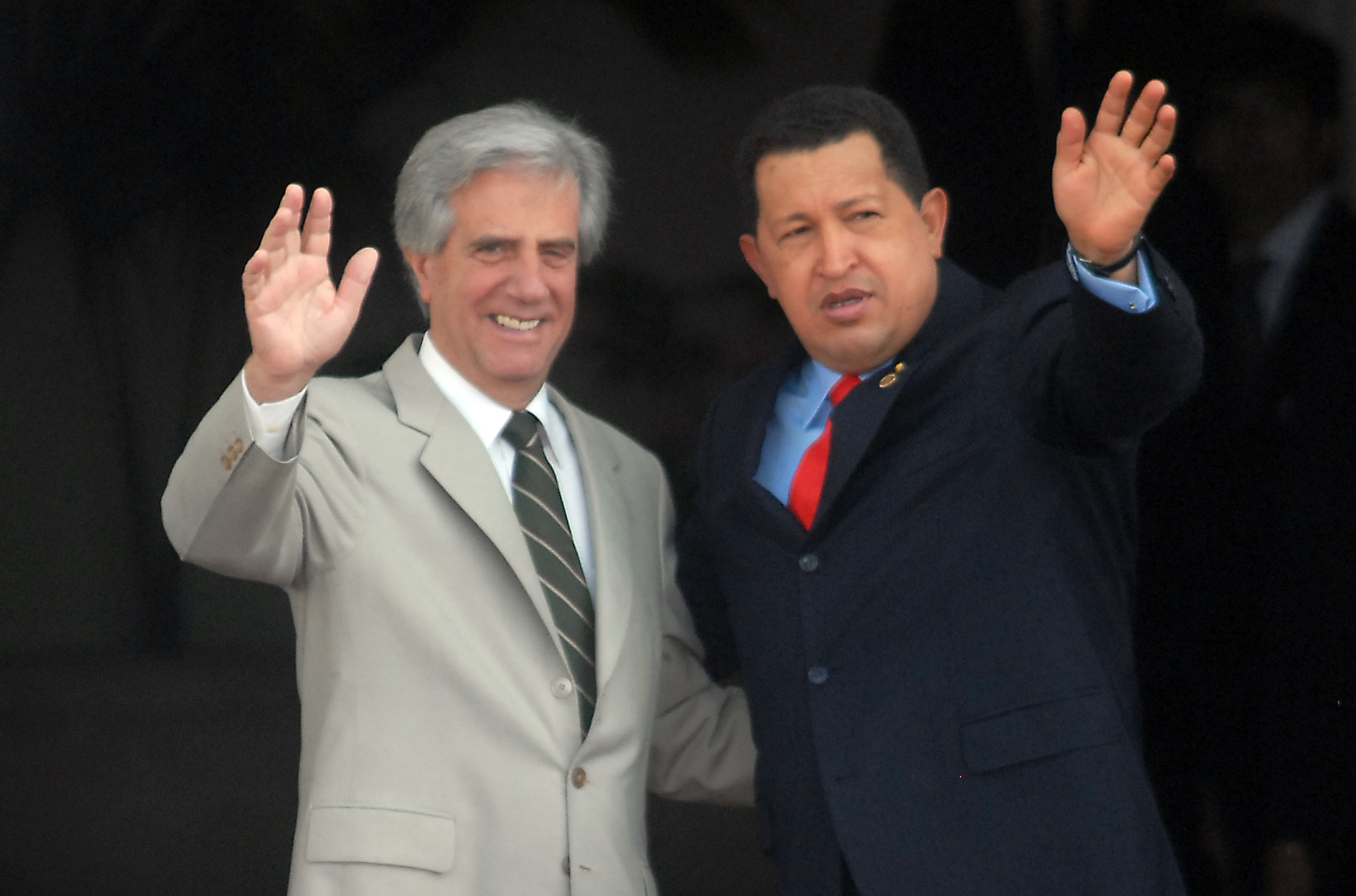
Vázquez with President of Venezuela Hugo Chávez in December 2007

According to an Equipos/MORI opinion poll his approval had fallen to 44% by April 2007, a level below the electoral support he received in the 2004 elections. His approval later recovered, however, reaching 80% by his last term in office.

In October 2006, President Vázquez was still personally more popular than his government with a 62% approval rating. However, a considerable drop in the government's popularity was registered by an Equipos/MORI poll in late April 2007, showing that 44% of Uruguayans approved of his administration. A new poll by Factum showed a 57% approval by June 2008, however, indicating a significant recovery from a year earlier.

== 2009 presidential election ==
The Constitution of Uruguay does not allow presidents to run for immediate reelection. With this in mind, in January 2008, members of the ruling coalition made proposals to amend the document in order to allow Vázquez to run again in 2009, however Vázquez ruled out a 2009 run. José Mujica was elected in November 2009 as president and Vázquez was offered to resume the presidency of the Frente Amplio but he declined. Vázquez went on to be the Frente Amplio candidate for presidency in 2014.

On 4 December 2008, Vázquez resigned his leadership posts at the Socialist Party due to controversy over his opposition to abortion rights.

== Second presidency of Uruguay (2015–2020) ==
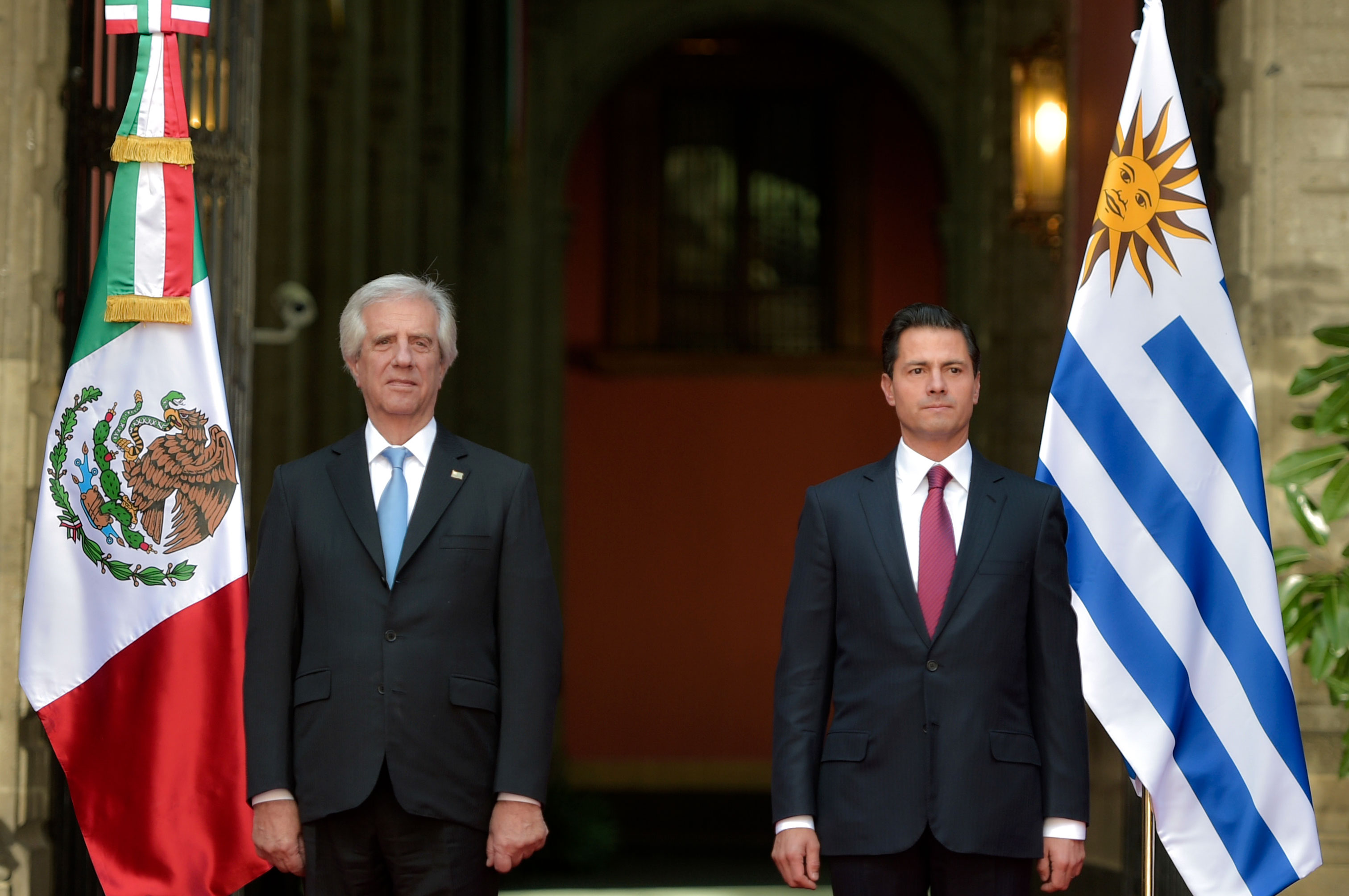
Vázquez with President of Mexico Enrique Peña Nieto in November 2017

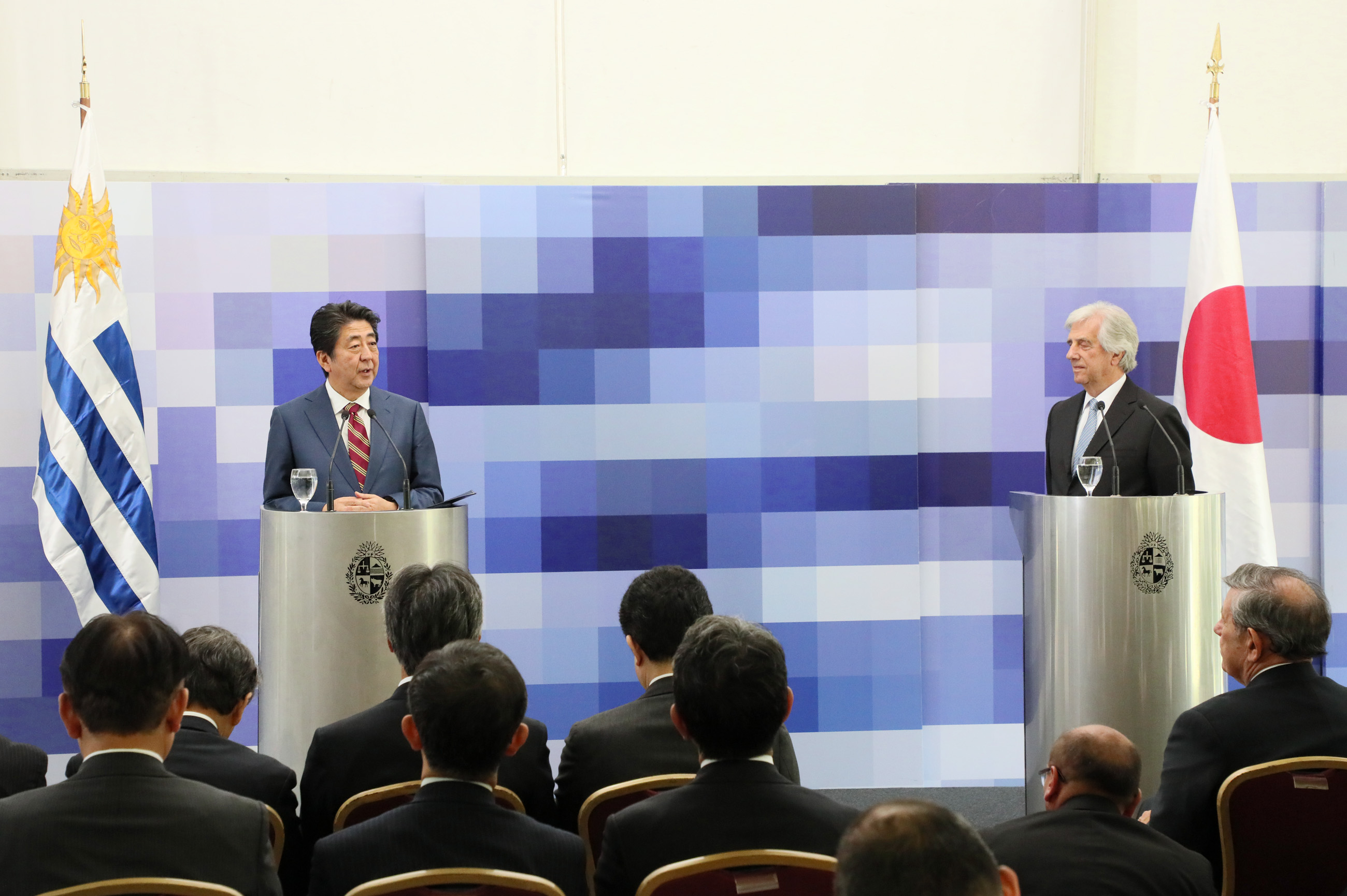
Vázquez with Japanese Prime Minister Shinzo Abe in December 2018

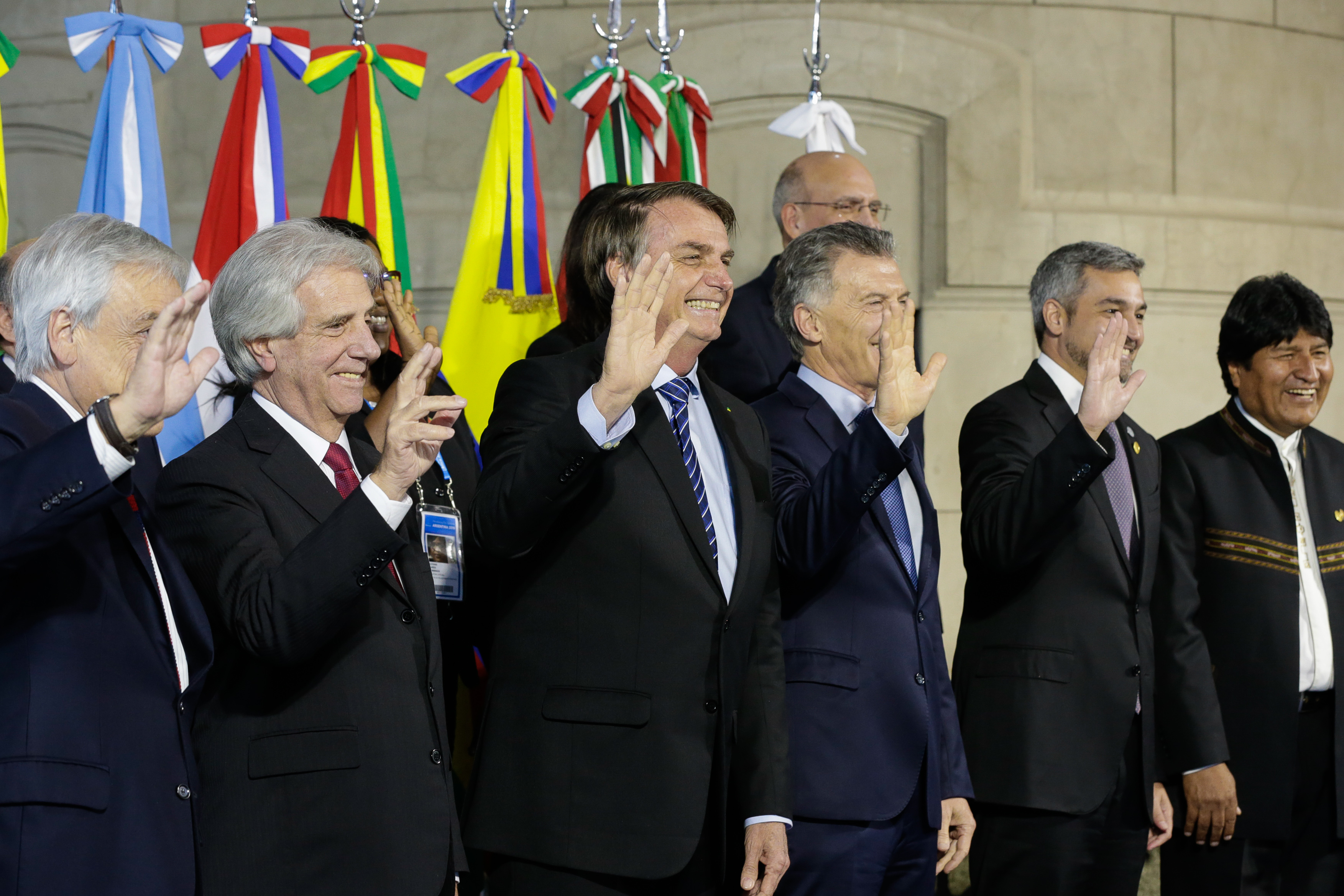
Vázquez at the 2019 Mercosul summit

In February 2010, a poll showed that he would finish the term ended on 1 March 2010 with a historic 61% approval rate. Vázquez finally left office with an 80% approval rating. He formally accepted his candidacy for the 2014 election in February 2013. Renominated by the Broad Front for the presidency with running mate Raúl Fernando Sendic on 1 June, he came up just a few thousand votes short of winning the presidency outright in 26 October election. He was returned to office in the 30 November runoff, defeating right-wing candidate Luis Lacalle Pou of the National Party by 53% to 41% in the second round. Vázquez took office on 1 March 2015, succeeding José Mujica. After assuming the position, he also became the President pro tempore of UNASUR until 23 April 2016, as he succeeded at the same time José Mujica who was holding the presidency of this international organization. On 9 September 2017, his running mate and Vice President Raúl Fernando Sendic resigned after he was accused allegedly of misusing public funds while heading state oil company Ancap. Sendic's bad image began with a scandal over his non-existent degree in Human Genetics in 2016, and deeply damaged the image of Vázquez and his government which already suffered from historically low approval.

During his second presidency, he spent much of his efforts on fighting non-communicable diseases. The Pan American Health Organization named him Public Health Hero of the Americas in 2018 in recognition of his work.

== Personal life and death ==
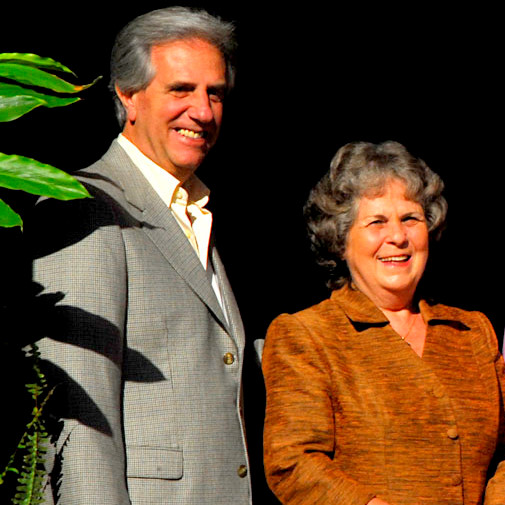
Vázquez and his wife, María Auxiliadora Delgado, in 2007

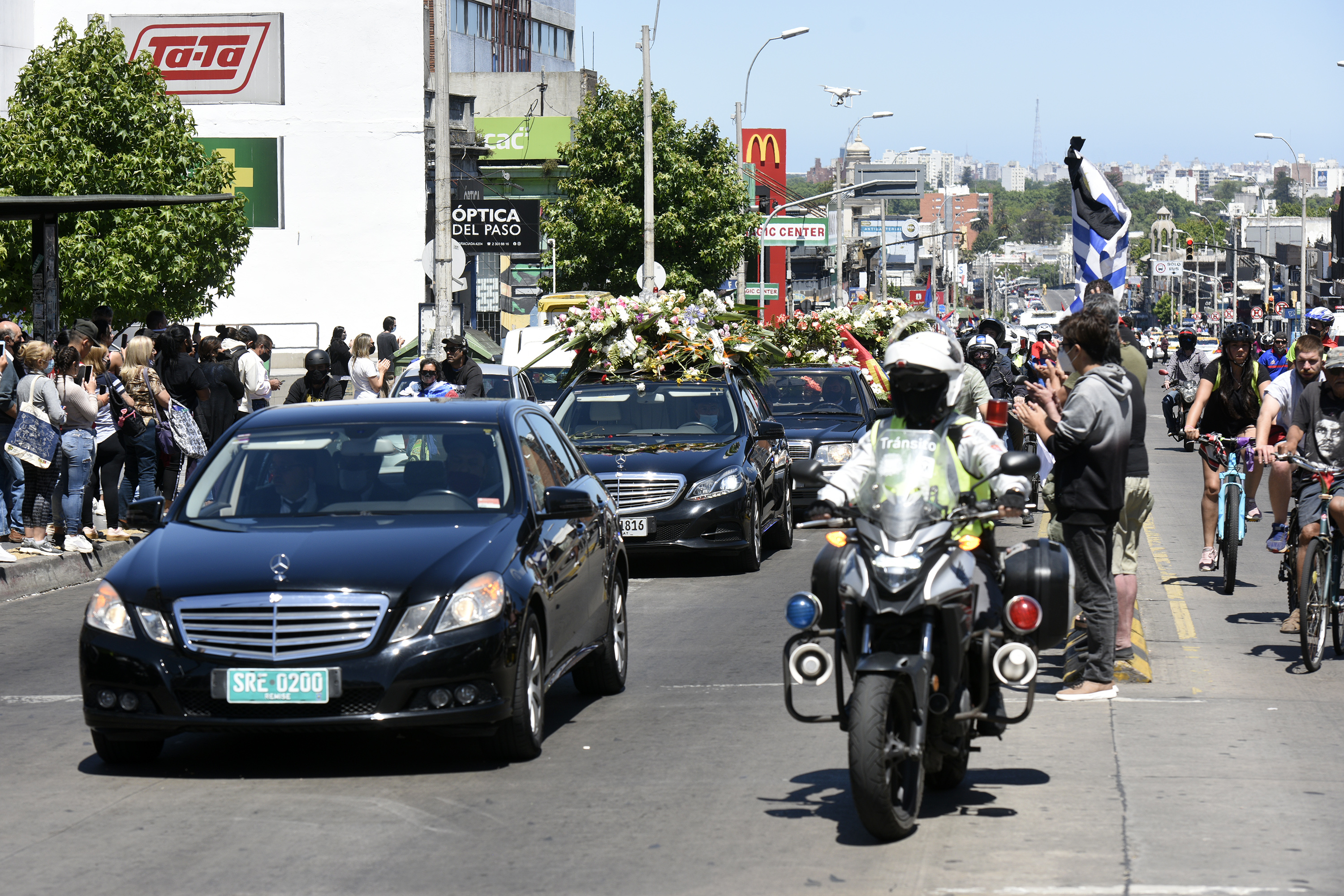
Vázquez's funeral procession in December 2020

Vázquez married María Auxiliadora Delgado on 23 October 1964 in the Montevideo parish of Los Vascos. She died of a heart attack on 31 July 2019. They had three biological children together and an adopted son.

On 20 August 2019, President Vázquez revealed that he suffered from a lung nodule with malignant appearance. Nevertheless, he announced his intention of finishing his presidential term on 1 March 2020 as planned. At mid-November, it was confirmed by authorities of the Public Health Ministry that his lung cancer was cured. On 27 November 2020, the rumor spread of his worsening state of health and a Republica journalist announced that his cancer had metastasized to the pancreas. That day, his son reported that his father was in home hospitalization after suffering an acute thrombosis in his left leg, but was recovering.

He died of lung cancer in Montevideo on 6 December 2020, at age 80. President Luis Lacalle Pou declared three days of national mourning following his death and said that Uruguay "lost a prominent scientist and a citizen defender of human rights". His funeral was held in "intimacy" due to the COVID-19 pandemic and he was buried at Cementerio de La Teja in Montevideo alongside his wife. During the funeral procession, thousands of people took to the streets to see him off to applause and cheers. The night before a national applause was called from the balconies.

== Honours and awards ==
=== National honours ===
Award or decoration	Country	Date	Place	Note	Ref
Medal of Military Merit, 1st Class	Uruguay	18 May 2011	Montevideo	Highest Uruguayan Army-related military award	

=== Foreign honours ===
Award or decoration	Country	Date	Place	Note	Ref
Grand Collar of the Order of San Carlos	Colombia	19 September 2005	Cartagena	Second highest civilian Colombian decoration	
Order of Merit	Qatar	2 May 2007	Doha	Highest Qatari decoration	
Extraordinary Grand Cross of the Order of Omar Torrijos Herrera	Panama	16 June 2008	Panama City		
National Order of Merit	Ecuador	7 March 2010	Montevideo	Second highest Ecuadorian decoration	
Grand Collar of the National Order of San Lorenzo	Ecuador	7 September 2010	Quito	Highest Ecuadorian decoration	
Collar of the Order of the Aztec Eagle	Mexico	14 November 2017	Mexico City	Highest Mexican decoration	

=== WHO recognition ===
Vázquez was awarded the World Health Organization Director-General's Award in 2006 in recognition of his leadership on tobacco control in Uruguay, which has implemented some of the most stringent tobacco control measures in the world.

== See also ==
- Pink tide

Political offices
Preceded by Eduardo Fabini Jiménez	Intendant of Montevideo; 1990–1994	Succeeded by Tabaré González
Preceded by Jorge Batlle	President of Uruguay; 2005–2010	Succeeded by José Mujica
Preceded by José Mujica	President of Uruguay; 2015–2020	Succeeded by Luis Alberto Lacalle Pou
Party political offices
Preceded by Liber Seregni	Leader of the Broad Front; 1996–1999	Succeeded by Jorge Brovetto
