= Líber Seregni =

Uruguayan general and politician

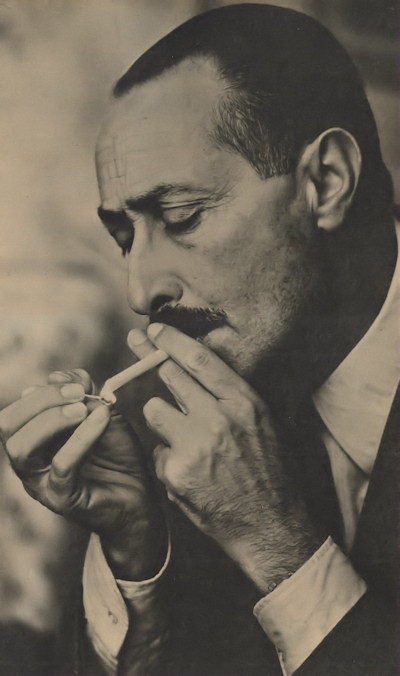
- Seregni in 1971
- Born: 13 December 1916; Palermo, Montevideo
- Died: 31 July 2004 (aged 87)
- Occupations: Military officer Politician
- Political party: Colorado Party (until 1971); Broad Front (from 1971)
- Spouse: Lilí Lerena
- Children: 2
- Honours: Lenin Peace Prize
- Military career
- Allegiance: Uruguay
- Branch: National Army
- Rank: Commander

Líber Seregni Mosquera (13 December 1916 – 31 July 2004) was a Uruguayan military officer and politician. In his youth he was a member of the Colorado Party. Under successive governments of that party, he had a successful military career until his retirement in 1968.

In 1971, Seregni split with the Colorado Party. He founded the Broad Front (Frente Amplio), a left-wing political coalition, and was its presidential candidate in the general election of 1971. Banned and imprisoned by the military dictatorship, he was released in 1984. In 1989 he was once again presidential candidate in the general elections.

== Early life ==
Seregni was born on 13 December 1916, in the Palermo barrio of Montevideo, Uruguay.

His primary school education was at the "Escuela Brasil" ("Brazil School") in the Pocitos barrio.

In 1937 he was arrested for participating in a demonstration in support of the Second Spanish Republic.

== Military career ==
Seregni joined the Army of Uruguay in 1931, and was promoted the junior officer rank of Alférez three years later. He rose to the rank of colonel in 1958 and to general in 1963. In 1959 Seregni organized the evacuation of Paso de los Toros when the city was flooded in the Uruguayan floods of April 1959. He served as Military attaché to the Uruguayan Embassies in Mexico and the United States of America.

Seregni was appointed commander of the second military region of San José and then the first military region of Montevideo.

== Post-Dictatorship and Death ==
In 1971, he made an unsuccessful run for president as the Frente Amplio candidate, receiving 18.3% of the vote (3rd place). From 1973 until 1984 he was imprisoned under the military dictatorship of Uruguay. In 1989, after the end of the dictatorship, he made his second attempt at the presidency and received 20.35% of the votes (2nd place).

He died on 31 July 2004, of pancreatic cancer, three months before the Frente Amplio won the 2004 presidential elections. Seregni was given a State funeral, as the then-current Colorado Party government directed.

== Personal life ==
He married Lilí Lerena 1941; the couple had two daughters, Bethel and Giselle.

== Honors ==
- Lenin Peace Prize, 1980-1982.
- Funeral with state honors, 2004.
