= Rafael Michelini =

Uruguayan politician

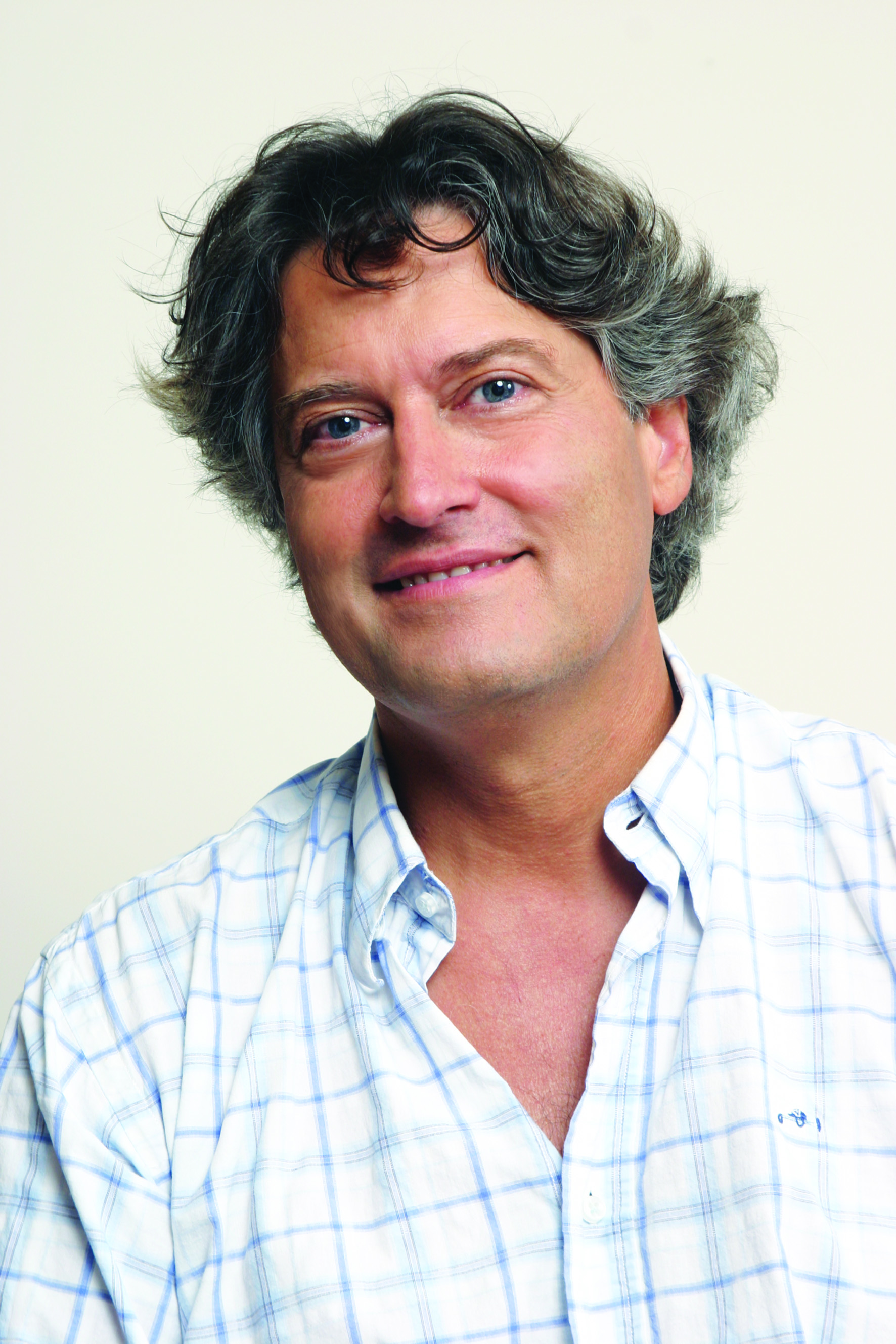
- Michelini in 2009

Senator of the Republic
- In office February 15, 1995 – February 15, 2020

Personal details
- Born: October 30, 1958 (age 67) Montevideo, Uruguay
- Party: Frente Amplio; New Space
- Parents: Zelmar Michelini (father); Elisa Delle Piane (mother)

Rafael Michelini Delle Piane (born 30 October 1958 in Montevideo) is a Uruguayan politician. He is currently Senator of the Republic of Uruguay as a member of the Frente Amplio coalition, and was the founder of New Space party. He was the seventh of ten children, and is the son of Zelmar Michelini, a former senator who was assassinated in Buenos Aires during Operation Condor. As a result, he has been active in human rights issues, primarily those stemming from the dictatorship.

In the elections of 1984, the first since the end of the military dictatorship which had ruled Uruguay from 1973 to 1984, Michelini was elected to the city council in Montevideo running for the Party for the Government of the People. Five years later, he joined the breakaway group led by Hugo Batalla, forming a new party, the New Area, supporting the presidential candidacy of Batlle for the elections of 1989, in which Michelini was elected deputy.

In 1994, he disagreed with the alliance between Hugo Batalla and the Colorado Party, and in response founded the New Space party with other dissidents. The party is part of the Frente Amplio coalition, and has twice nominated Michelini for President of Uruguay. In the first election in 1994 he obtained 5.16% of total votes cast, while in 1999 he obtained 4.56% of the vote. On both occasions he was elected Senator. In 2003 he reached an agreement with the Progressive Encounter-Broad Front, called the New Majority, in which he returned to his old political party. Some sections of the New Space directed by Pablo Mieres disagreed with this decision, left the party, and founded the Independent Party. The Frente Amplio won the election in 2004, and as part of the coalition Michelini won a seat in the Senate. During his time as Senator, Michelini drafted a law on the integration of men and women in the electoral lists of political parties, and drafted a declaration naming July 17 of each year a day of National Suicide Prevention.

He is married to Arq. Matilde Jorge and has four children: Clara, Juan Pedro, Beatriz, and Martin. His brother Felipe Michelini is also a member of the Senate, and has served for three terms.
