= Broad Front (Uruguay) =

Broad Front Frente Amplio
- Leader: Yamandú Orsi
- President: Fernando Pereira Kosec
- Founder: Líber Seregni
- Founded: 5 February 1971; 55 years ago
- Headquarters: Colonia 1367, Montevideo
- Ideology: Progressivism; Social democracy Democratic socialism
- Political position: Centre-left to left-wing
- Regional affiliation: COPPPAL; São Paulo Forum
- Colors: Red; Blue; White
- Chamber of Representatives: 48 / 99
- Senate: 16 / 30
- Intendencias: 4 / 19
- Mayors: 32 / 125

Party flag

Website
- www.frenteamplio.uy

The Broad Front (Spanish: Frente Amplio, FA) is a political coalition in Uruguay. Since 2025, it has been the ruling party of Uruguay, having previously ruled from 2005 to 2020 and has produced three presidents: Tabaré Vázquez (2005–2010; 2015–2020), José Mujica (2010–2015) and Yamandú Orsi (2025–present). Since 1999, it has been the largest party in Uruguay's General Assembly.

== History ==
The Frente Amplio was founded in 1971 as a coalition of over a dozen fractured leftist parties and movements. The first president of the front and its first candidate for the presidency of the country was General Líber Seregni. The front was declared illegal during the 1973 military coup d'état and emerged again in 1984 when democracy was restored in Uruguay.

Progressive Encounter (Encuentro Progresista) was formed in 1994 by several minor independent factions and the Frente Amplio. EP and FA started contesting elections jointly under Encuentro Progresista - Frente Amplio. Later, another force, Nuevo Espacio, became linked to the front. Thus, it began contesting elections as Encuentro Progresista - Frente Amplio - Nueva Mayoria.

In 2005, member organizations of Progressive Encounter and New Majority (essentially Nuevo Espacio) merged into the front, and the coalition took the name of the larger force, Frente Amplio. Previously, EP and later NM had been allied with FA but organizationally separate structures.

The alliance is formed by:

- Uruguay Assembly (Asamblea Uruguay) led by Danilo Astori
- Socialist Party of Uruguay (Partido Socialista del Uruguay) led by Daniel Martínez
- Communist Party of Uruguay (Partido Comunista del Uruguay) led by Óscar Andrade
- Current 78 (Corriente 78)
- New Space (Nuevo Espacio) led by Rafael Michelini
- Artiguist Stream (Vertiente Artiguista) led by Enrique Rubio
- Movement of Popular Participation (Movimiento de Participación Popular) led by Lucía Topolansky
- Christian Democratic Party of Uruguay (Partido Demócrata Cristiano del Uruguay)
- Party of the Communes (Partido de los Comunes)
- Broad Front Confluence (Confluencia Frenteamplio)
- Progressive Alliance (Alianza Progresista) led by Rodolfo Nin Novoa
- People's Victory Party (Partido por la Victoria del Pueblo)

=== Pre-2004 election: economic crisis ===
Starting with the election of Luis Alberto Lacalle of the National Party in 1989, economic reform designed to modernize the country quickly began, which led to a devaluing of the peso and laws protecting banking secrecy. This secrecy led to Uruguayan banks becoming a place to launder money from drugs and other illegal businesses. By the turn of the century, half the nation had to survive in the informal economy. In 2002, the economic crisis of Brazil and Argentina spread to Uruguay, which crashed due to lacking productive power. In August of that year, the nation received 1.5 billion US dollars from the IMF to try and help with the crisis. This was the state of the country when the Broad Front began campaigning for the 2004 election.

The Broad Front firmly established itself as the country's third major political force at the 1994 election. Its presidential candidate, Tabaré Vázquez, who replaced longtime leader Seregni as the party's standard-bearer, finished with the most votes of any individual candidate. However, under the Ley de lemas system, Vázquez was denied the presidency because the Broad Front finished with the third-most votes of any party, behind the Colorados and Blancos. At the time, the highest-finishing candidate of the party winning the most votes was elected president. At the same time, the Broad Front surged to 31 seats in the Chamber of Representatives and nine in the Senate.

The Ley de lemas was scrapped for presidential elections in favor of a two-round system for the 1999 election. Vázquez led the field in the first round but lost the runoff to the Colorados' Jorge Batlle after the two traditional parties set aside their long rivalry to defeat him. At the same time, the Broad Front became the largest party in the legislature.

=== 2004 election: Tabaré Vázquez and economic reform ===
The party's victorious 2004 campaign was the first instance of a left-leaning party gaining the majority in Uruguay. Two major reasons the party took power in 2004 were a substantial movement towards more moderate policies and their support of an increased welfare state, creating a bond with working-class people tired of the neoliberal practices of the end of the twentieth century.

When Tabaré Vázquez first took the position of president with a Broad Front majority in the Uruguayan General Assembly, he quickly moved to strengthen diplomatic relations with other Latin American countries, including Cuba. Important to the future success of the party is the US$100 million anti-poverty program that Vázquez signed early in his career, which helped to ensure the support of the lower class in future elections. Uruguay required economic reform when Vázquez stepped into power in 2005, as it was struggling to recover from the crisis of 2002, with a third of the country still below the poverty line. An important aspect of the economic development was the new Minister of Economics and Finance, Danilo Astori, who worked to create a good relationship with the IMF and obtained the foreign investment needed to kick-start a paper pulp industry. Economic reform was also highlighted by a change in the immigration policy of the US president and increased beef exports to the European Union.

=== 2009 election: Mujica and social liberation ===
Since gaining power, the party has maintained the electorate's support, as analysis of the 2009 election has led to some conclusions that the trust in the stable government played a large part in keeping the Broad Front in power. After the 2009 election, former guerrilla José Mujica became president, and during his time in power, he passed several leftist social policies. The legalization of abortion, same-sex marriage, and marijuana all occurred under the second consecutive Broad Front majority in the federal government. As noted above, Vázquez vetoed a bill to decriminalize abortion in 2008, but the party as a whole was more supportive of the legalization. Support for legal abortions was universal within the party by 2012 when all party senators voted in favor of a new bill that decriminalized the procedure within the first 12 weeks of pregnancy. In April 2013, same-sex marriage was passed, supported by the party, which took a hard-line stance against the role of the church in legislation on the matter. The most recent major change under the Mujica presidency was the legalization of marijuana, which he signed in December 2013. A point of consideration for this event is that legalization was not supported by the general population, but the Broad Front still chose to act in favor of it. The economy continued to grow with Astori transitioning from Minister of Economics and Finance to vice president, a position he used to continue advertising Uruguay as a safe place for foreign investment.

=== 2014 election: Tabaré Vázquez is re-elected ===
The Broad Front supported the re-election of Tabaré Vázquez in the 2014 election, which Vázquez won with 56.5% in the second round, defeating the National Party's candidate Luis Lacalle Pou. During his second mandate, Vázquez faced strong criticism from the opposition because he refused to cut political ties with Venezuelan President Nicolás Maduro despite allegations of violations of human rights.

=== 2019 election: out of government ===
The Broad Front supported Daniel Martinez for the 2019 general election. Martinez arrived first in the first round but was defeated in the run-off by Luis Lacalle Pou of the National Party (also endorsed by the Colorado Party and Cabildo Abierto). The Broad Front was defeated at the polls for the first time in 15 years. The party also lost its majority in the Chamber of Representatives and the Senate while remaining the largest party in the General Assembly.

=== 2024 election: return to government ===
After a period out of government and as majority opposition in the General Assembly, the Broad Front pushed three candidates for the primary elections: former intendant of Salto Andrés Lima, former Intendant of Montevideo Carolina Cosse, as well as their peer from Canelones Yamandú Orsi. However, only Cosse and Orsi were relevant to the electoral contest. The first is a left-leaning politician, more aligned with socialist democratic values, supported by the most left-wing sectors of the coalition, such as the Socialist Party and the Communist Party. In contrast, the second one has presented himself as a fully centrist, pragmatic candidate who tends to engage more in dialogue with the opposition, supported by the largest sector of the front led by the Movement of Popular Participation.

With Orsi winning and the party amassing 42.22% of all valid votes, a ticket with Cosse was immediately announced the same night of the primaries, ratifying a previous decision to assemble a formula that would comply with gender parity. During the first round of the election, the formula was the most voted yet again, monopolizing 43.86% of the votes and achieving a majority in the Senate without the need to secure the vice president's seat. However, it fell two seats short of a majority in the Chamber of Representatives.

However, due to electoral law and failing to secure more than half of the votes, the election went to a second round between Orsi and the candidate of the National Party, Álvaro Delgado, who counted with the political support of the rest of the parties that formed the governing Republican Coalition as well as Eduardo Lust, from the Environmental Constitutional Party. The Orsi-Cosse formula would nonetheless gather the support of minority leaders within the parties that form the coalition, with Zaida González Legnani of the Colorado Party and Victor Björgan of the National Party announcing their support on the days preceding the second round in November.

Despite polls showing parity between the two formulas that took part in the second round, the Broad Front formula would beat their opponents by a margin of 3.9%, with Delgado quickly conceding the election as Orsi vowed to become a president "who calls again and again for national dialogue to find the best solutions."

On 1 March 2025, Yamandu Orsi took office as Uruguay's new president, meaning the Broad Front, returned to power after a five-year interruption.

== Members ==
=== Political parties with representation ===
Party	Ideology	Position	President	Representatives	Senators
Movement of Popular Participation; Movimiento de Participacion Popular	Progressivism; Democratic socialism	Centre-left to left-wing	Lucía Topolansky	35 / 99	9 / 30
Uruguay Assembly; Asamblea Uruguay	Social democracy Social liberalism	Centre to centre-left	Danilo Astori	5 / 99	2 / 30
Socialist Party of Uruguay; Partido Socialista del Uruguay	Social democracy Democratic socialism	Centre-left to left-wing	Gonzalo Civila	0 / 99	1 / 30
Communist Party of Uruguay; Partido Comunista del Uruguay	Communism	Left-wing	Óscar Andrade	5 / 99	2 / 30
Progressive Alliance; Alianza Progresista	Social democracy	Centre-left	Rodolfo Nin Novoa	2 / 99	1 / 30
Artiguist Tendency; Vertiente Artiguista	Artiguism; Social democracy	Centre-left	Enrique Rubio	0 / 99	2 / 30
New Space; Nuevo Espacio	Social democracy Third Way	Centre to centre-left	Rafael Michelini	1 / 99	0 / 30
People's Victory Party; Partido por la Victoria del Pueblo	Marxism; Libertarian socialism Guevarism	Left-wing to far-left	Hugo Cores	1 / 99	0 / 30

== Splits ==
In its history, despite attracting political factions from other parties over time, the Broad Front has also suffered some splits as well:

- In 1989, the Party for the Government of the People and the Christian Democratic Party of Uruguay left the Broad Front to form a new centrist coalition.
- In 1993, the far-left Oriental Revolutionary Movement split and formed a political party.
- In April 2006, there was another split from the far-left: the March 26 Movement and other groups left and formed a new coalition, Popular Assembly (later known as Popular Unity).

== Ideology ==
The Broad Front consists primarily of progressive political parties, defined as Artiguist, popular, democratic, anti-oligarchy, anti-imperialist, anti-racist, and anti-patriarchy. In economics, it tends to follow social democratic policies with expanded social programs. It has major internal factions characterized as social-liberal, marxist, communist, and eco-socialist. However, not all the parties in the Broad Front lean left. Indeed, some minor factions are more fiscally or socially conservative. Uruguay Assembly of Danilo Astori and New Space of Rafael Michelini can be considered centrist parties. Astori has followed fiscally conservative policies as finance minister, whereas the Christian Democratic Party is vocally anti-abortion.

== Internal elections ==
=== 2004 ===
In 2004, the first internal elections for EP-FA-NM were held. Previously, elections had only been held within FA.

List	Party		Votes	%
609	Espacio 609	Movimiento de Participación Popular	148,426	33.18
609	Espacio 609	Izquierda Abierta	148,426	33.18
609	Espacio 609	Movimiento Claveles Rojos	148,426	33.18
609	Espacio 609	Columna Blanca	148,426	33.18
90	Espacio 90	Partido Socialista	79,090	17.68
90	Espacio 90	Movimiento Socialista Emilio Frugoni	79,090	17.68
90	Espacio 90	Partido por la Seguridad Social	79,090	17.68
90	Espacio 90	Acción Renovadora	79,090	17.68
2121	Espacio 2121	Asamblea Uruguay	40,741	9.11
2121	Espacio 2121	Movimiento Popular Frenteamplista	40,741	9.11
738	Alianza Progresista	Confluencia Frenteamplista	37,628	8.41
738	Alianza Progresista	Corriente 78	37,628	8.41
738	Alianza Progresista	Partido Demócrata Cristiano	37,628	8.41
738	Alianza Progresista	Corriente Encuentrista Independiente	37,628	8.41
77	Vertiente Artiguista	Artiguismo y Unidad	34,536	7.72
77	Vertiente Artiguista	Izquierda Democrática Independiente	34,536	7.72
99000	Nuevo Espacio		30,762	6.88
1001	Democracía Avanzada	Partido Comunista del Uruguay	26,569	5.94
1001	Democracía Avanzada	Frente Izquierda de Liberación	26,569	5.94
326	Movimiento 26 de Marzo		12,175	2.72
1303	Corriente Popular		8,776	1.96
1813	Liga Federal Frenteamplista		7,425	1.66
5271	Corriente de Izquierda	Tendencia Marxista	5,233	1.17
5271	Corriente de Izquierda	Alternativa Popular 1815 – Espacio Solidario	5,233	1.17
5271	Corriente de Izquierda	Partido Socialista de los Trabajadores-CI	5,233	1.17
5271	Corriente de Izquierda	Unión Popular	5,233	1.17
567	Unión Frenteamplista	Partido por la Victoria del Pueblo	2,664	0.64
9393	Corriente de Unidad Frenteamplista		2,354	0.53
1968	Partido Socialista de los Trabajadores-IV Internacional		387	0.09
871	Partido Obrero Revolucionario (Trotskista-Posadista)		371	0.08
5205	Movimiento 20 de Mayo		198	0.04
11815	-		86	0.02
2571	Agrupación 5 de Febrero de 1971		23	0.01
Total: 447,313

== Electoral history ==
=== Presidential elections ===
Election	Party candidate	Running mate	Votes	%	Votes	%	Result
Election	Party candidate	Running mate	First Round		Second Round		Result
1971	Líber Seregni	Juan José Crottogini	304,275	18.3%	—	—	Lost ✗
1984	Juan José Crottogini	José D'Elía	401,104	21.3%	—	—	Lost ✗
1989	Líber Seregni	Danilo Astori	418,403	20.35%	—	—	Lost ✗
1994	Tabaré Vázquez	Rodolfo Nin Novoa	621,226	30.6%	—	—	Lost ✗
1999	Tabaré Vázquez	Rodolfo Nin Novoa	861,202	40.1%	982,049	45.9%	Lost ✗
2004	Tabaré Vázquez	Rodolfo Nin Novoa	1,124,761	51.7%	—	—	Elected ✓
2009	José Mujica	Danilo Astori	1,105,262	47.96%	1,197,638	54.63%	Elected ✓
2014	Tabaré Vázquez	Raúl Sendic	1,134,187	47.81%	1,226,105	53.48%	Elected ✓
2019	Daniel Martínez	Graciela Villar	949,376	40.49%	1,152,271	49.21%	Lost ✗
2024	Yamandú Orsi	Carolina Cosse	1,071,826	46.12%	1,196,798	52.08%	Elected ✓

==== Note ====
Under the electoral system in place at the time, called the Ley de lemas system, each political party could have as many as three presidential candidates. The combined result of the votes for a party's candidates determined which party would control the executive branch, and whichever of the winning party's candidates finished in first place would be declared president. This system was used from the 1942 election to 1994 until, in 1996, a referendum amended the constitution to restrict each party to a single presidential candidate, effective from the 1999 election.

=== Chamber of Representatives and Senate elections ===
Election	Votes	%	Chamber seats	+/−	Senate seats	+/−	Position	Size
1971	304,275	18.3%	18 / 99	New	5 / 30	New	Opposition	3rd
1984	401,104	21.3%	21 / 99	▲3	6 / 30	▲1	Opposition	3rd
1989	418,403	20.35%	21 / 99	0	7 / 30	▲1	Opposition	3rd
1994	621,226	30.8%	31 / 99	▲10	9 / 31	▲2	Opposition	3rd
1999	861,202	40.1%	40 / 99	▲9	12 / 30	▲3	Opposition	▲1st
2004	1,124,761	51.7%	52 / 99	▲12	17 / 30	▲5	Majority	1st
2009	1,105,262	47.96%	50 / 99	▼2	16 / 30	▼1	Majority	1st
2014	1,134,187	47.81%	50 / 99	0	15 / 30	▼1	Majority	1st
2019	949,376	40.49%	42 / 99	▼8	13 / 30	▼2	Opposition	1st
2024	1,071,826	46.12%	48 / 99	▲6	16 / 30	▲3	Minority	1st

== See also ==
- Politics of Uruguay
