= Second presidency of Tabaré Vázquez =

Uruguayan presidential administration from 2015 and 2020

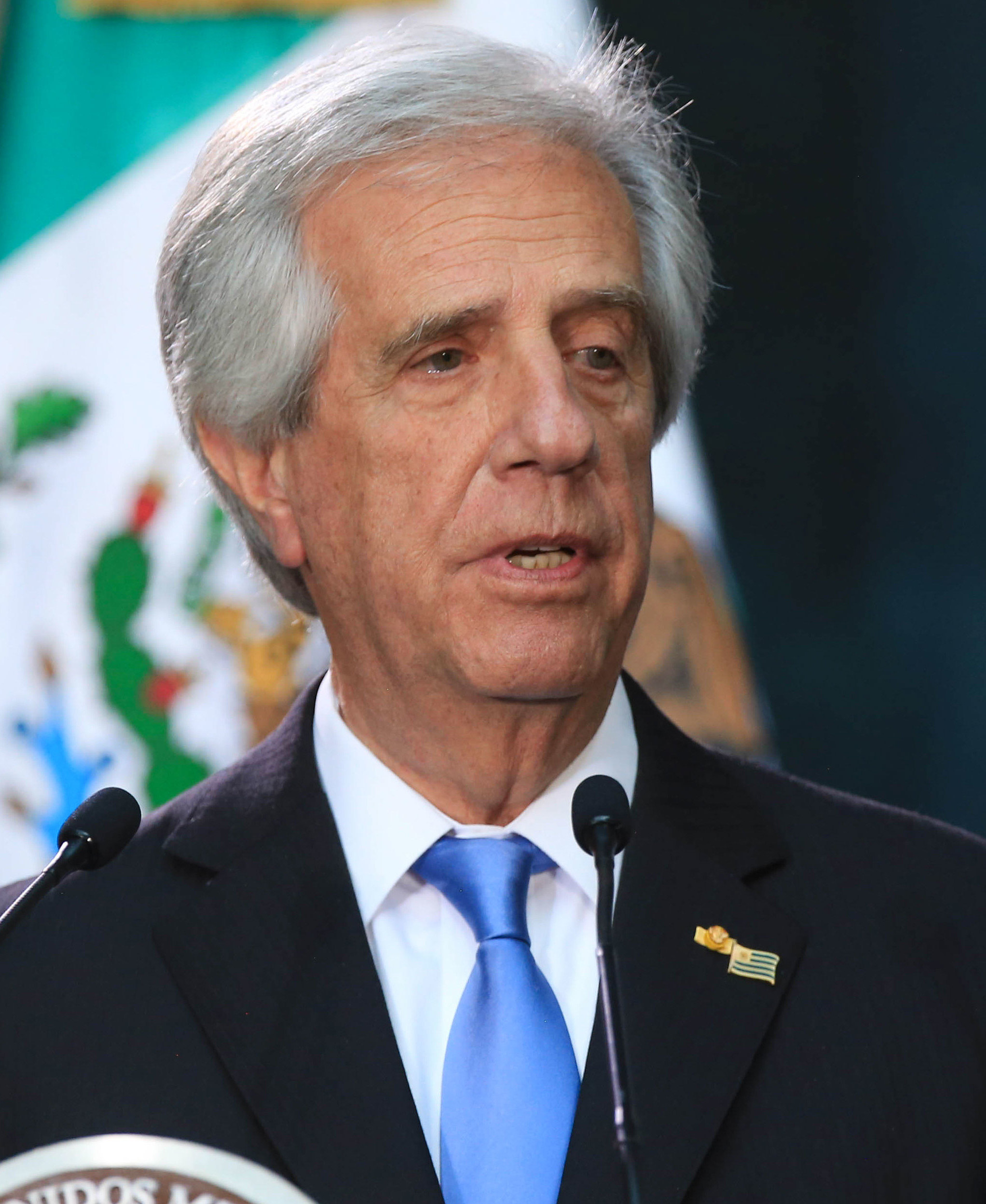
- Second presidency of Tabaré Vázquez; 1 March 2015 – 1 March 2020
- Cabinet: See list
- Party: Broad Front
- Election: 2014
- Seat: Executive Tower

The Second presidency of Tabaré Vázquez refers to Tabaré Vázquez's second and last tenure as the 41st president of Uruguay whicu started on 1 March 2015 when he was inauguration until he left office on 1 March 2020. Vázquez, a member of the Broad Front Party had also previously served as Uruguay's president from 2005 until 2010 but nonetheless, Vázquez took office following his victory over the National Party nominee Luis Lacalle Pou (Note: Lacalle Pou is also the son of former president Luis Alberto Lacalle which also ran and made it to the runoff in the Previous 2009 Election.) in second round of the 2014 general election, thus granting another five years of leftism. This presidential term continued the policies established since the Broad Front came into power in 2005. Among the featured policies were the establishment of a National Caregiving System, the creation of the Ibirapitá Plan to promote the introduction of technology among the elderly, the transgender people law, and the authorization of the second pulp mill plant of the multinational company UPM.

== 2014 national elections ==
By the general election in October, Broad Front obtained 47.81% of votes against 30.88% obtained by the runner-up National Party and 12.89% of Colorado Party, among others, which required a second round to elect the presidential formula. There, Broad Front got elected 15 of 30 seats in the Senate, coming close to getting absolute majority in this chamber (which at the end reached when its vice-president was elected). In the Representatives chamber got the absolute majority with 50 of 99 members.

After the second round, won the runoff the presidential formula of Tabaré Vázquez-Raúl Sendic with 53.48% of votes cast against 41.17% of National Party formula of Luis Lacalle Pou-Jorge Larrañaga. Therefore, this granted a third government to the Broad Front.

== Cabinet ==
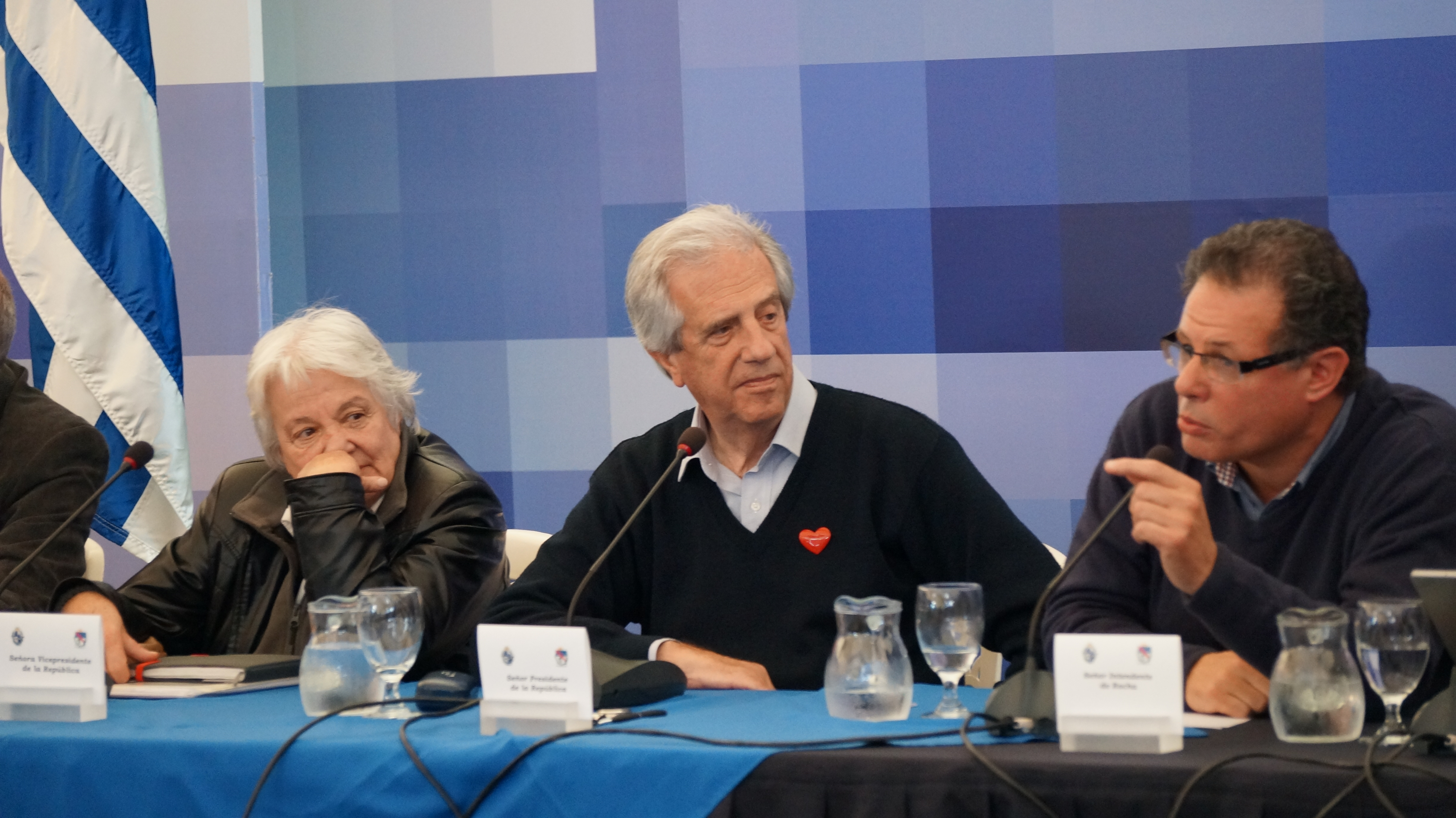
Tabaré Vázquez and Lucía Topolansky during an open session of the Council of Ministers in the Rocha Department.

Cabinet of Tabaré Vázquez's second government
Office	Name	Political party	Term
Ministry of National Defense	Eleuterio Fernández Huidobro	Broad Front	1 March 2015 – 5 August 2016
Ministry of National Defense	Jorge Menéndez	Broad Front	12 August 2016 – 1 April 2019
Ministry of National Defense	José Bayardi	Broad Front	1 April 2019 – 29 February 2020
Ministry of the Interior	Eduardo Bonomi	Broad Front	1 March 2015 – 14 February 2020
Ministry of the Interior	Jorge Vázquez Rosas	Broad Front	15 February 2020 – 1 March 2020
Ministry of Foreign Relations	Rodolfo Nin Novoa	Broad Front	1 March 2015 – 1 March 2020
Ministry of Economy and Finance	Danilo Astori	Broad Front	1 March 2015 – 1 March 2020
Ministry of Education and Culture	María Julia Muñoz	Broad Front	1 March 2015 – 1 March 2020
Ministry of Public Health	Jorge Basso	Broad Front	1 March 2015 – 1 March 2020
Ministry of Social Development	Marina Arismendi	Broad Front	1 March 2015 – 1 March 2020
Ministry of Labour and Social Welfare	Ernesto Murro	Broad Front	1 March 2015 – 1 March 2020
Ministry of Transport and Public Works	Víctor Rossi	Broad Front	1 March 2015 – 1 March 2020
Ministry of Livestock, Agriculture, and Fisheries	Tabaré Aguerre	Broad Front	1 March 2015 – 12 January 2018
Ministry of Livestock, Agriculture, and Fisheries	Enzo Benech	Broad Front	12 January 2018 – 1 March 2020
Ministry of Industry, Energy and Mining	Carolina Cosse	Broad Front	1 March 2015 – 29 January 2019
Ministry of Industry, Energy and Mining	Guillermo Moncecchi	Broad Front	30 January 2019 – 1 March 2020
Ministry of Housing, Territorial Planning and Environment	Eneida de León	Broad Front	1 March 2015 – 1 March 2020
Ministry of Tourism	Liliam Kechichián	Broad Front	1 March 2015 – 31 January 2020
Ministry of Tourism	Benjamín Liberoff	Broad Front	31 January 2020 – 1 March 2020
Secretariat of Sports	Fernando Cáceres	Broad Front	1 March 2015 – 1 March 2020
Secretariat of the Presidency	Miguel Toma	Broad Front	1 March 2015 – 1 March 2020
Deputy Secretariat of the Presidency	Juan Andrés Roballo	Broad Front	1 March 2015 – 1 March 2020
Office of Planning and Budget	Álvaro García	Broad Front	1 March 2015 – 1 March 2020

== Domestic affairs ==
=== Public administration ===
==== Creation of the General Office of the Attorney General of Uruguay as Decentralized Service ====
Since 2015 the Office of the Attorney General of the Nation (or Public Ministry) is not anymore an executing unit under the arms of the Ministry of Education and Culture and is now a decentralized service, independent from the Executive.

==== Approval of a new policy regarding civil servants in duty of foreign services ====
In December 2019 a new policy of civil servants of Foreign Services was enacted by Law No. 19841, replacing the former one created during the civic-military dictatorship of Uruguay of 1973–1985, with the purpose of updating the Foreign Service of the Uruguayan public administration. This law updated the legal body taking into account the changes in the functional relationship and the reality of current international relations and, in addition, to unify the legal dispersion of old laws on the matter generated over the years. One of the reforms implemented by the new statute is to lower the age of mandatory retirement of ambassadors at 70 years old.

=== Industry, energy and mining ===
==== Search for petroleum, without success ====
During 2016, the government agreed with French petroleum company Total to began drillings on the Uruguayan maritime platform, about 6400 meters deep, with the goal of finding crude oil. During this search President Vázquez gathered with former presidents since the return to democracy to deploy—if commercially exploitable petroleum deposits would be found—a State policy for the management of the revenues obtained by the resource, citing the example of Norway. However, the French company's report result was negative, not being proven the existence of petroleum in the exploration in one of the blocks of the maritime platform. This led the climate of optimism of the government to fell down and the opposition raised some criticism, stating that the notice and meetings were rushed and reckless.

In October 2018, another exploration was performed, this time on land, in Cerro Padilla, Paysandú Department, 845 meters below ground by the company Schuepbach Energy (subsidiary of Petrel Energy), and it found traces of hydrocarbons, although samples of this deposit had to be analyzed in order to find out if it was commercially profitable. In November 2017, the company reported that the amount was insignificant and its exploitation was not commercially profitable. In the same month, the company started to drill on Cerro de Chaga, Salto Department, but it had to suspend the search the petroleum due to the need of new associates to add additional funding. In April 2018, the company announced it did not have enough funds to continue the exploration.

==== UPM 2 ====
In mid July 2019, the government and the representatives of Finnish multinational company UPM confirmed an investment for the construction of its second pulp mill plant in Uruguay, with an investment of about 2.7 billion of United States dollars plus an additional 350 million to perform public works in the port of Montevideo and to build housing facilities in Paso de los Toros. The initial plan for the opening of the plant was foreseen for early 2022. The investment would generate 6000 jobs during the construction stage, and after that would be generated 10000 jobs, 4000 directly contacted by the company and the remaining from contractors in the supply chain of 600 companies. The investment would mean a gross domestic product growth of 2% and would bring economic growth in Durazno, Florida, Cerro Largo and Tacuarembó Departments between 10% and 15% of these Departments' GDPs.

This investment was well received by the Government, as well as part of the opposition parties' members, such as Luis Lacalle Pou of National Party and Julio María Sanguinetti of Colorado Party, who also supported the project but disagreed with the way and terms of the negotiations. However, some political groups, such as Popular Unity Party and part of Open Cabildo Party rejected the secrecy of the negotiations and the terms of the investment contract, pointing out the environmental issues that could arise with the construction and commission of the plant or otherwise that the government gave up too much in the negotiation.

=== Environment ===
In December 2018 with the Agroecology Law a National Plan of Agroecology was created, where it was considered as a general interest of the people the promotion of production and distribution systems, and the consumption of agroecological goods, applying an ecological vision to the design, development and management of sustainable agricultural ecosystems. It involves, among others, family agriculture producers and other systems of urban and sub-urban agriculture. It also drives a national certification system of organic food to validate the quality of these products and that they abide by the standards of sustainable production and that they respect the environment without the usage of chemical products. This system is supported by the Honorary Commission of the National Plan of Agroecology under the supervision of the Ministry of Livestock, Agriculture and Fisheries.

=== Healthcare ===
==== Right to medical emergency assistance in any healthcare provider ====
After the Budget Review Law of 2017, by its Articles 145 to 149, was established and recognized the right to medical emergency and urgency assistance to every resident of the country, to be provided by every health care provider in the country, and thus securing the medical attention outside the patient's place of residence. This means that when a user of the health system needs medical attention and its health care provider does not or could not have a service in the location where is currently the user nor have any arrangement with a local health provider, this user may be attended with any other provider. The user afterwards will pay for the cost of the service to his own health provider according to the fees established by law. Later the user's health provider must compensate the fees to the health provider which provided to the user the emergency care.

==== National Caregiving System ====
Since Caregiving Law No. 19,353 of 27 November 2015, the right of all persons unable to care fully for oneself to receive care with quality, as well as to promote a cultural change for caregiving to be shared equally by both genders. This system involves to look after the needs of persons getting care, such as the elderly, persons with disabilities that render them unable to care themselves, underage people, specially children under 3 years of age, but also takes into account carers' rights.

=== Social issues ===
==== Ibirapitá Plan ====
In 2015, the Ibirapitá Plan was created. This plan delivered tablets to about 400,000 retirees with poor retirement pension of up to 24,400 Uruguayan peso per month, in order to address the so-called "gray gap" or "digital gap" in this part of the population.

This plan sought to deal with the elder, a neglected population group with many hardships, and was argued that giving tablets would have more impact than using the destined funds from the budget to raise the retirement or disability pension, with a lesser impact. With the tablet, access to communication, technology and the internet was made possible for people over 65 years old, who previously did not have such advantages, allowing them to manage applications about their health, public processes, news and other cultural contents. Moreover, it allow them to get in contact with family relatives and friends in the country and abroad, in a stage of life when elder adults tend to be left alone. The tablet also would encourage to grantees to make an effort and learn how to use it, avoiding with this process the tendency to inertia.

In a 2019 study, the lack of infrastructure was the most important barrier to internet use among women with 65 or older age recipients of the tablet from Ibirapitá Plan: between the tablet, internet connection, computer and cellular phone, only the presence of the Ibirapitá tablet and internet connection had significant impact. The composition of family members and the home structure has also impact on internet access: when the elderly have sons or daughters abroad, this works as a motivator to have internet access, while the presence of them in the home is an obstacle. This would also occur when there is the presence of children under 14 years old in the home. The study also found that with the older the age, the possibility of using internet decreases, but with the Ibirapitá tablet this reduction is lowered.

==== Comprehensive Law for Transgender Persons ====
Law No. 19,684, also known as "Comprehensive Law for Transgender Persons" or "Transgender Law", of 26 October 2018, was enacted after a law proposal sent by the Executive Branch, with the support of multiple civil organizations. This law recognized the freedom of identity, by which any person has the right to develop their own personality according to their gender identity. Based on this, the State must develop policies aimed at resident transgender persons, as they have been historically victims of discrimination due to their identity.

It enables the option to "adapt" or change their name and gender in personal identification documents. In the case of children under 13, this should be done after a consultation with professionals, with prior consent from their parents or legal guardians.

For transgender persons born before 31 December 1975, if they prove they were violated in their rights due to their identity during the 1973-1985 dictatorship, they are able to request a monthly compensatory lifelong pension of about 3 BPC, provided that they already do not receive another pension or do not earn above 15 BPC monthly. This can be requested up to 10 years after the law came into force.

Regarding education and work, a one-percent quota for public employments reserved to transgender persons was established, as long as the candidates meet the requirements to perform the job. National Institute of Employment and Professional Training also must allocate 1% of its quotas in training programs to be granted to transgender persons.

In the health system the prohibition of discrimination to transgender people in the medical field was established, and transgender persons have the right to receive comprehensive healthcare to sex reassignment surgery or treatments. To this aim, the regulation established that all health institutions under the National Integrated Health System must make available all comprehensive programs that the Ministry of Public Health mandates, either on its own means or contracted.

Mandated also that minors can access to permanent sex reassignment treatments, but this requires authorization or consent from their parents or legal guardians.

In mid 2019, some National Party legislators with bonds to evangelical churches started a signature collection campaign to begin a pre-referendum proceeding, by which if a 25% of the electoral roll could call for a referendum to repeal the Comprehensive Transgender Identity Law. However, this campaign failed to reach the minimum of signatures required, reaching about 9.90% of the electoral roll, compared to the 25% required to be able to call for the referendum.

=== Housing ===
Since October 2017 the upper limit to be able to access to credit for real estate and other public housing programs was raised, from a general limit of 60 UR to another in several categories according to the number of people living in the house: a single person with earnings up to 40 UR, two persons up to 60 UR, three persons up to 72 UR, four persons up to 84 UR and with families with five or more persons living together the upper limit to be able to access credit is 96 UR. This change of the policy was performed to attend to the situation where families with five or more members have low earnings very near the poverty line in order to be able to be covered by this housing plan, and at the same time the people living alone and the families without children were favored detrimental to families with children. Therefore, this reform intended to expand the coverage of this plan of credits for housing.

== Foreign affairs ==
=== International trips ===
During the first year of his second presidency, president Tabaré Vázquez made less international trips than his predecessor José Mujica in the same period of Mujica's government. In April 2015 attended the 7th Summit of the Americas in Panama City, where he met with the president of the United States Barack Obama.

This is a list of official visits abroad made by Vázquez during his second term in office, from 1 March 2015 to 1 March 2020:

==== 2015 ====
#	Location	Date	Purpose
1	Panama Panama City	10–11 April	Participation in the 7th Summit of the Americas.
2	Brazil Brasília	21 May	Visit at the invitation of President Dilma Rousseff following her visit to Montevideo.

==== 2016 ====
#	Location	Date	Purpose
1	China Beijing	12–19 October	With a delegation of authorities, business leaders, and workers to present Uruguay at the China–LAC 2016 forum, sign agreements, and for Vázquez to deliver a lecture on tobacco at Tsinghua University.

==== 2019 ====
#	Location	Date	Purpose
1	Argentina Buenos Aires	10 December	Together with president-elect Luis Lacalle Pou to attend the inauguration of the new President of Argentina, Alberto Fernández.

=== Withdrawal from Inter-American Treaty of Reciprocal Assistance ===
In September 2019, there was a call for vote to activate the Inter-American Treaty of Reciprocal Assistance, a defense treaty thought for the situation of if one country of the Americas is attacked, it will be considered an attack to all the countries of the Americas and therefore each of the countries bond by the treaty is committed to fight the attack, but the intention of the voting was to fight the Venezuela's government of Nicolás Maduro to capture and extraditate Venezuelan chavist officials, allegedly involved in crimes of corruptions. In that situation, chancellor Rodolfo Nin Novoa announced that if the treaty is used in this kind of situation that would enable military strikes against Venezuela, Uruguay would leave the treaty.

On 23 September took place the vote, resulting with 16 votes supporting the activation of the Treaty, one vote against by Uruguay, one abstention of Trinidad and Tobago and an absence of Cuba, what led to activate the treaty to deal with the crisis in Venezuela, process promoted by the Lima Group aligned with the United States. The next day, chancellor Nin Novoa announced the retreat of Uruguay from Inter-American Treaty of Reciprocal Assistance. He described the treaty as obsolete and unhelpful, that was being used in an inappropriate way. He also argued that this resolution violated the principle of peaceful solution of controversies and non-intervention in domestic affairs of other countries.

The process of denunciation of the treaty to unbind from the international obligations assumed by subscribing and ratifying it becomes effective after two years since the denunciation. The then candidate for the presidency Luis Lacalle Pou coincided with the argument that the Inter-American Treaty of Reciprocal Assistance was created with other goals in mind, but he said that nevertheless should not leave the treaty. The next year, after being elected and assuming his position as the next president of Uruguay, Luis Lacalle Pou decided to revoke the denunciation and rejoin the treaty.

== Controversies ==
=== Resignation of Vice-President Raúl Sendic ===
On 9 September 2017, the then Vice-President of Uruguay Raúl Sendic announced after the Broad Front plenary his resignation of the vice presidency. This occurred after a ruling of the Political Conduct Court of the Broad Front party that stated the acts he committed were questionable in the ethical and political responsibility, repeatedly violating control laws. This would be the final act after months of internal divisions within the Broad Front where he were losing support from his party colleagues and rising criticism from the opposition parties, after a series of incidents where he was involved: the incident of the claimed degree in Human Genetics from the University of Havana, Cuba, that he claimed to have achieved but after that he could not prove it, even admitting he was not graduated as he claimed before; he underwent to several judicial trials for his management of public company ANCAP, including one for the questionable expenses he carried out with the corporate credit card of the company, including shopping in clothing store, jewelry and electronic products.

=== Fiftiers protest movement ===
"Fiftiers" (Cincuentones) was the name of a social group arose in 2015 formed by persons affected by the 1995 retirement reform transition system, that established a mixed retirement system of social security, where entered to the system private entities called by their acronym AFAP in charge of the management of individual retirements savings, in combination with the intergenerational and solidary regime of the Banco de Previsión Social (BPS). The Fiftiers were affected because the BPS does not recognize the totality of its previous contributions previous to 1996, and since they contributed for less years than those workers who were always under the mixed system. This caused to those who ended being included under the transitional regime, the workers under 40 years of age and were earning an income greater than 5000 uruguayan pesos, to perceive retirement pensions lower than those who remained in the former regime, with the totality of their contributions to the intergenerational and solidary system, and also compared with those who always were under the mixed system.

During 2015, these persons, near their retirement from work activity, started to protest, conducting at leas two protests per month. They were organized through social networks, gathered in front of the Executive Tower and the Legislative Palace. Afterwards, a draft law was sent to Parliament, which received support from the national trade union center PIT-CNT and from the National Retirees and Pensioners Organization of Uruguay. The conflict ended after the Executive Branch yielded their position, and the Parliament enacted the Law No. 19,590, which rules that persons with reached 50 years of age as of 1 April 2016, under the mixed system of social security and with mandatory savings in AFAPs, could unsubscribe from the AFAPs and transfer the savings with their savings in BPS. The initial stage of transference began with advisory interviews to perform the calculations of the most convenient system for each one of them. After the interview, the worker had 90 days to decide if they maintained the AFAP savings in that entities or if they wanted to transfer them to the common fund of the State that have been created.

At the end of 2019, from the 61,556 of fiftiers entitled to make the change that received personal advicing, 43.8% (26,964 persons) had disaffiliated after being advised by BPS. This disaffiliation from AFAP was higher in amount in the case of active workers than from retirees.

=== Un Solo Uruguay protest movement ===
"Self-Summoned" (Autoconvocados) movement, later known as Un Solo Uruguay, is a social protest movement consisting of people linked with the agricultural, commercial and industrial sectors, spontaneously emerged at the beginnings of 2018, that in its protest of 23 January 2018 expressed its disconformity with the way the public spending was being done and the lack of policies to support certain economic sectors such as the agricultural-related ones, criticizing the dimensions and cost of the State.

=== Proceedings of the Honor Tribunal to Gilberto Vázquez and the dismissal of the leadership of defense ===
At the beginnings of 2019 President Tabaré Vázquez dismissed several members of the leadership of defense, among others the Minister of Defense Jorge Menéndez, the Deputy Secretary of Defense Daniel Montiel, and the Members of the Army's Honor Tribunal Commander-in-Chief of the Army General José González, Chief of the Fourth Division of the Army General Gustavo Fajardo and the Chief of the Defense Staff General Alfredo Erramún, being in addition forced to retire, and also the members of the Appeal Tribunal Carlos Sequeira, Alejandro Salaberry and Claudio Romano, all of them due to with the public disclosure of the proceedings of the Honor Tribunal became known that the Lieutenant Colonel (retired) José Gavazzo confessed he was the mastermind behind the forced disappearance of the Tupamaro guerilla member Roberto Gomensoro in March 1973, but the Honor Tribunal considered that for this and other homicides there was no motives to military condemn to Gavazzo and another military officer, that they did not harm the Army's Honour, but that they did commit very serious misconduct after they did not inform the Justice of these facts. This led to a scandal that also burdened the government due to the accusations from one side to another after if president Vázquez was or was not already aware of this facts.

== See also ==
- Pink tide
