= Presidency of José Mujica =

40th constitutional presidency of Uruguay

- Presidency of José Mujica; 1 March 2010 – 1 March 2015
- President: José Mujica
- Cabinet: See list
- Party: Broad Front
- Election: 2009
- Seat: Executive Tower

The presidency of José Mujica began on 1 March 2010 when he was inaugurated as the 40th constitutional president of Uruguay. Mujica, a member of Broad Front's Movement of Popular Participation, took office following his victory over the National Party's nominee Luis Alberto Lacalle in the second round of the 2009 Uruguayan general election, thus continuing another five years of leftist government.

This presidential term from one side continued the policies established since the Broad Front came into power in 2005, but on the other hand, introduced novel or innovative social policies such as the regulation and legalization of the market of cannabis, the approval of the same-sex marriage law and the legalization of abortion for women. This period also had the establishment of the second public university of Uruguay, the Technological University (UTEC).

Among the controversial issues developed during this administration was the case of the closure of state aviation company PLUNA and sell of its assets, that involved the minister of Economy, the president of the Bank of the Republic and Argentine entrepreneur Juan Carlos López Mena. Another case was the regasification plant and Gas Sayago company, that at the end did not came into working and led to losses of public funds.

== Background ==
In the first round of the 2009 Uruguayan general elections, Broad Front's José Mujica-Danilo Astori candidacy reached 47.96% of the valid votes against the 29.07% obtained by National Party's team of Luis Alberto Lacalle-Jorge Larrañaga, and the 17.02% of Colorado Party's nominees Pedro Bordaberry-Hugo de León, among other participant parties. This election granted Broad Front a majority in the Chamber of Deputies and in the Senate.

Due to none of the parties exceeded the 50% threshold to automatically win during the first round, it was required to have a second round to elect the presidential formula among the two most voted parties. It took place on 29 November between Broad Front's and National Party's candidates. Broad Front's formula finally ended up winning after it obtained the 54.63% of the valid votes against the 45.37% of National Party.

== Inauguration ==
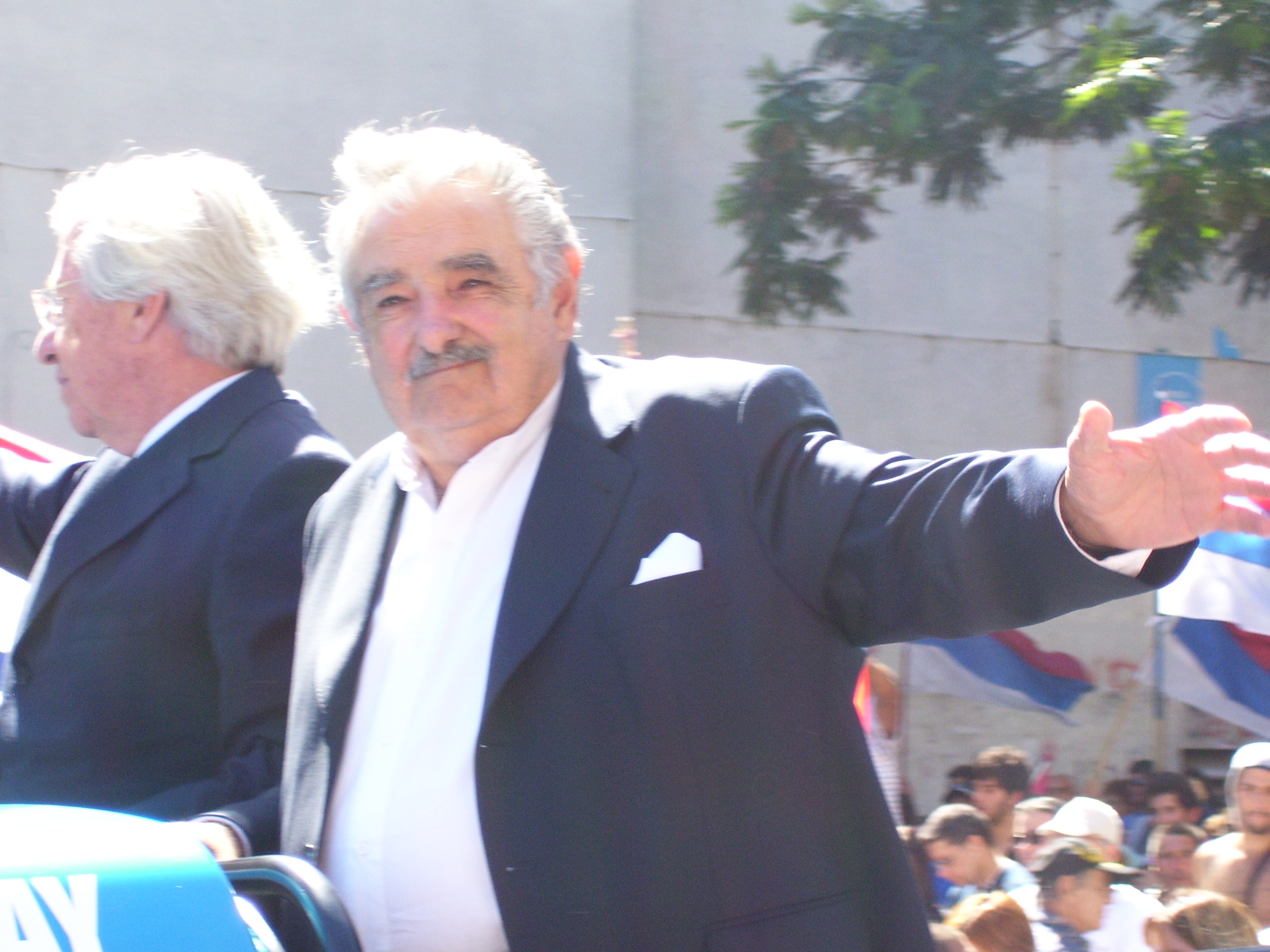
President Mujica and Vice-President Astori greeting at the public during the inauguration parade.

José Mujica was inaugurated as the new President of Uruguay on 1 March 2010. Several Latin American presidents attended this event: Cristina Fernández of Argentina, Evo Morales of Bolivia, Luiz Inacio Lula da Silva of Brazil, Álvaro Uribe of Colombia, Rafael Correa of Ecuador, Álvaro Colom of Guatemala, Fernando Lugo of Paraguay, and Hugo Chávez of Venezuela. The Prince of Asturias Felipe de Borbón representing Spain and Secretary of the State Hillary Clinton from the United States also attended this ceremony.

His wife Lucia Topolanksky took his oath, as well as Astori's oath. During his inauguration speech he talked about the need of a state reform. He mentioned the education, the environment and the public safety as priority issues.

== Cabinet ==
Office	Name	Term
President	José Mujica	2010-2015
Defense	Luis Rosadilla	2010-2011
Eleuterio Fernández Huidobro	2011-2015
Economy and Finance	Fernando Lorenzo	2010-2013
Mario Bergara	2013-2015
Education and Culture	Ricardo Ehrlich	2010-2015
Foreign Relations	Luis Almagro	2010-2015
Industry, Energy and Mining	Roberto Kreimerman	2010-2015
Interior	Eduardo Bonomi	2010-2015
Livestock, Agriculture and Fisheries	Tabaré Aguerre	2010-2015
Public Health	Daniel Olesker	2010-2011
Jorge Venegas	2011-2013
Susana Muñiz	2013-2015
Labour and Social Welfare	Eduardo Brenta	2010-2013
José Bayardi	2013-2015
Social Development	Ana María Vignoli	2010-2011
Daniel Olesker	2011-2015
Transport and Public Works	Enrique Pintado	2010-2015
Tourism and Sports	Héctor Lescano	2010-2012
Liliam Kechichián	2012-2015
Housing, Territorial; Planning and Environment	Graciela Muslera	2010-2012
Francisco Beltrame	2012-2015

Mujica's cabinet was firstly made up by the following politicians: Fernando Lorenzo as the minister of Economy and Finance as well as Pedro Buonomo as his deputy secretary, Roberto Kreimerman as minister of Industry, Energy and Mining with Edgardo Ortuño as the deputy secretary of the ministry, Tabaré Aguerre as minister of Livestock, Agriculture and Fisheries together with Daniel Garín as the deputy secretary, Graciela Muslera as the minister of Housing, Territorial Planning and Environment along with Jorge Patrone as the deputy secretary of this ministry, Enrique Pintado as the minister of Transport and Public Works and Pablo Genta as the deputy secretary, Luis Rosadilla as the minister of National Defense with Gabriel Castellá as the deputy secretary, Ana María Vignoli as minister of Social Development with Lauro Meléndez as the deputy secretary, Eduardo Bonomi as minister of the Interior and Jorge Vázquez as deputy secretary of the Interior, Luis Almagro as minister of Foreign Relations with Roberto Conde as his deputy secretary, Eduardo Brenta as minister of Labour and Social Welfare together with Nelson Loustaunau as the deputy secretary, Ricardo Erlich as minister of Education and Culture with María Simón as deputy secretary, Daniel Olesker as the new minister of Public Health and Jorge Enrique Venegas as the deputy secretary, Héctor Lescano as minister of Tourism together with Liliám Kechichián as the deputy secretary of that ministry.

On 26 July 2011, Eleuterio Fernández Huidobro, who in May of that year resigned his seat in the Senate due to disagreements with a law draft proposed from the Executive, was appointed as the new minister of Defense, replacing minister Rosadilla who resigned for health reasons.

== Domestic policy ==
=== Education ===
During Broad Front's first presidency led by Tabaré Vázquez, a line of action on educational policies was established by the General Law on Education, the National Plan of Education 2010-2030 and the National Strategy of Childhood and Adolescence 2010–2030. However, these guidelines were not strictly followed by Mujica's administration regarding the implemented measures.

The measures on education taken during this administration tended toward the promotion of the educational inclusion through the democratization of the educational system, giving boost to the infrastructure of schools, the establishment of the Council of Training in Education and of the National Institute of Educational Evaluation, but according to María Ester Mancebo and Alexandra Lizbona, that meant that Broad Front's second administration tended to keep the statu quo in the mandatory education system, without managing to wholly deploy the institutional framework foreseen by the General Law on Education. These scholars also pointed out that despite their strategic importance, two educational policies were not deployed: the reform of the secondary education and the reform of the statute of the teaching staff.

At the end of 2012 the creation of the Technological University of Uruguay, the second public university of Uruguay, was passed, with a technological focus and with a strong presence in the Uruguayan interior, in order to decentralize the tertiary education of the country. During this administration, since its creation by law, the founding period of the university saw its first budget assignment, the appointment of a provisional Central Board of Directors members Pablo Chilibroste, María Antonia Grompone and Rodolfo Silveira, and started to draft the first university degrees.

=== Industry, energy and mining ===
==== Project Aratirí ====
Project Aratirí was an open pit mining project for iron extraction in Uruguay proposed by the Indian multinational company Zamin Ferrous, with an intended investment of 3 billion of dollars. This project was planned to be executed in the region between Treinta y Tres, Durazno and Florida Departments, over the Cuchilla Grande hill range and near Cerro Chato and Valentines settlements. This project also proposed the creation of a deep water port and a 214-kilometer pipeline to transport the minerals from the open pit mines to that proposed port, through which the concentrated iron would be exported. Finally this project would have failed.

==== Regasification plant and Gas Sayago ====
Another project announced by this administration was one that intended to build a regasification plant at the shores of Western Montevideo's Puntas de Sayago area, including a pier of 1800 meters, a dock and a gas pipeline. This would also included an anchored ship to store the natural gas, process it and send it to the liquefied gas network. These works sought to obtain gross profits of around a billion dollars for UTE and 150 million for ANCAP, in addition to have the fee of natural gas reduced for the population.

=== Social policies ===
==== Plan Juntos ====
The Plan of Social and Housing Integration "Juntos", or "Plan Juntos" (Plan "Together"), was an initiative launched at the beginnings of the administration to provide low-income families the access to a decent housing. This project supposed to be a plan to support the build up of a home and was not just a housing plan, as it also intended the labour development, social insertion and citizenship participation, encouraging the regeneration of broken bonds due to the poverty and marginalization at the family, neighbourhood and civic levels. In other words, it was established to encourage the participation of the beneficiaries and social solidarity through society's support with technicians or workforce, or seeking donations of money or materials from the private sector. It had the financial support of José Mujica, who donated part of his salary of president to finance the project.

==== Legalization of cannabis ====
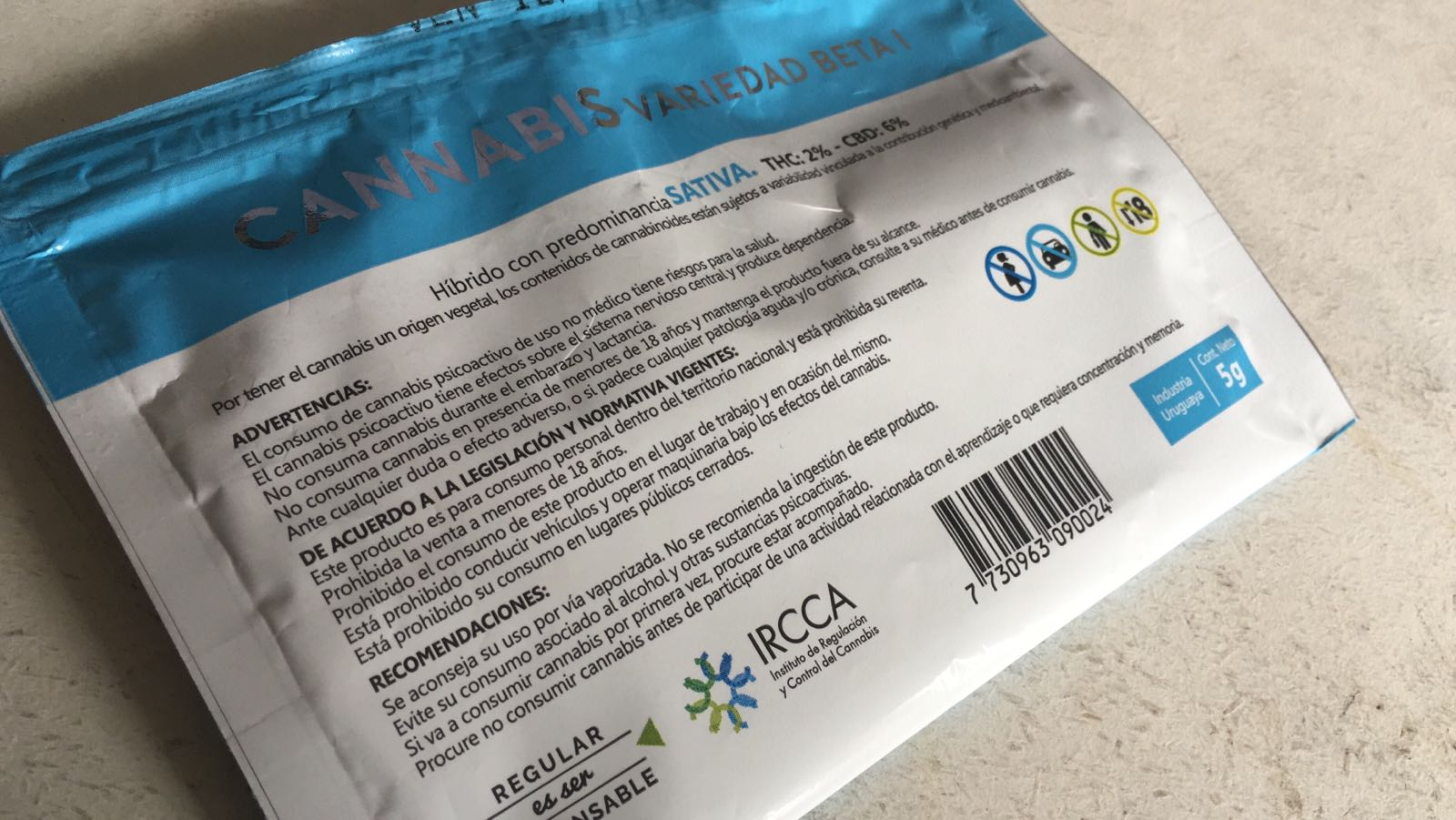
A package of state produced cannabis.

On 20 December 2013, Law No. 19172 was promulgated, and it legalized and regulated the production, distribution, and sale of cannabis, and created the Institute of Regulation and Control of Cannabis to watch for several aspects of import, production and sale of cannabis. It allowed the self-cultivation for residents, up to a maximum of six plants, or a maximum yearly production of 480 grams. It also allowed the creation of cannabis clubs where their members, whose number must be between 15 and 40 associates, are allowed to grow up to 99 cannabis plants to produce proportionally for their associates. Besides that, it made possible to buy state cannabis in pharmacies, where users can buy up to 40 grams monthly.

==== Legalization of abortion ====
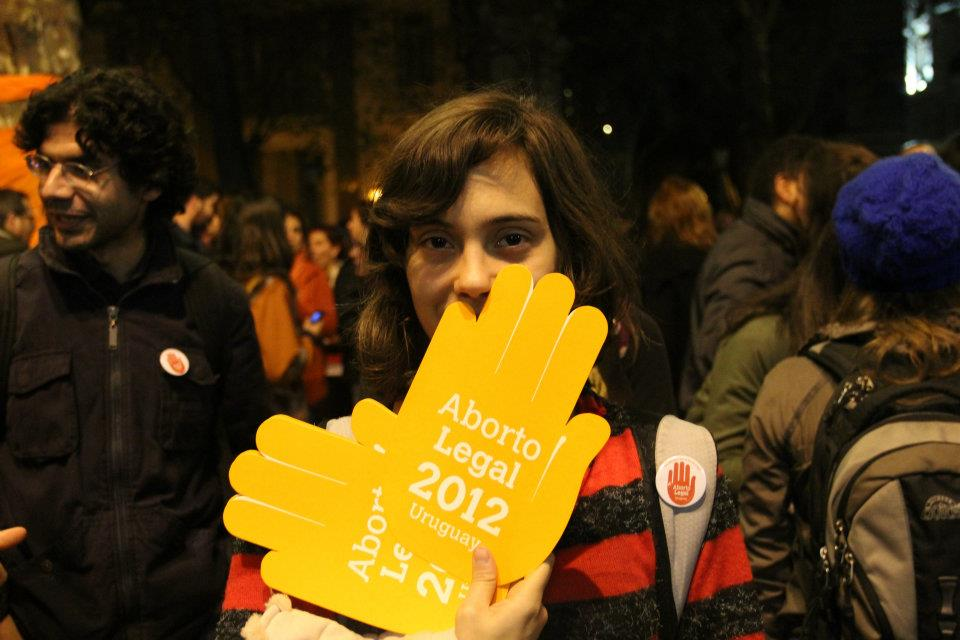
Demonstration in support of abortion rights in 2012.

In October 2012, abortion by women's own choice was decriminalized and legalized, provided that it was performed under the requirements set by the Voluntary Interruption of Pregnancy Law No. 18987 of 22 October 2012. This law established that it was mandatory for every health centers to provide a pregnancy interruption service after women's request.

In order to perform an abortion, it must be requested within the first twelve weeks of pregnancy. The woman must notify her physician her willingness to perform an abortion, then she will be attended by a multidisciplinary team of professionals to inform her of what an abortion entails and after that she is granted a five-day period of thought to reconsider her will. Once this reflection period ends and she did not change her will to abort, the medical procedure is carried out.

Since the legalization, it was recorded a decrease of the average maternal mortality, from 25 deaths per 100,000 live borns in 1999, to 14 deaths per 100,000 live borns in 2015, due to the establishment of a risk reduction model and to the decriminalization of the abortion that reduced the maternal mortality caused by unsafe abortions. Another contribution of the decriminalization is that reduced the infant mortality after the decrease of maternal mortality, because when one of the parents, and particularly the mother, dies, infant mortality tends to increase, but after the reduction of maternal mortality created by unsafe abortions, the risk of infant mortality as a consequence of their mother's death is reduced. From the legalization, there was a period of temporary increase in the number of abortions, but that stabilized during the next years and began a gradual decrease, that compared to when the abortion is illegal, where the prevalence of abortion is greater. Along this legalization came a plan to promote the use of contraconceptive to avoid unwanted pregnancies.

==== Same-sex marriage law ====
The Egalitarian Marriage Law was approved on 10 April 2013 by the Parliament, and once promulgated by the Executive, marriage was redefined by not requiring to be made up of two persons of different sex. It also reformed the way divorce is performed and the order of the parents' surnames are assigned to the children, in the latter, the order of surnames of heterosexual couples may be reversed and for homosexual couples could be chosen by agreement or by judicial lottery.

=== Labour ===
Regarding labour, José Mujica administration continued the policies implemented during the first presidency of Tabaré Vázquez, tending to consolidate labour structures. During this period, the fourth and fifth rounds of Wage Councils (Consejos de Salarios) took place.

== Foreign policy ==
=== Fray Bentos international bridge blockade lifting ===
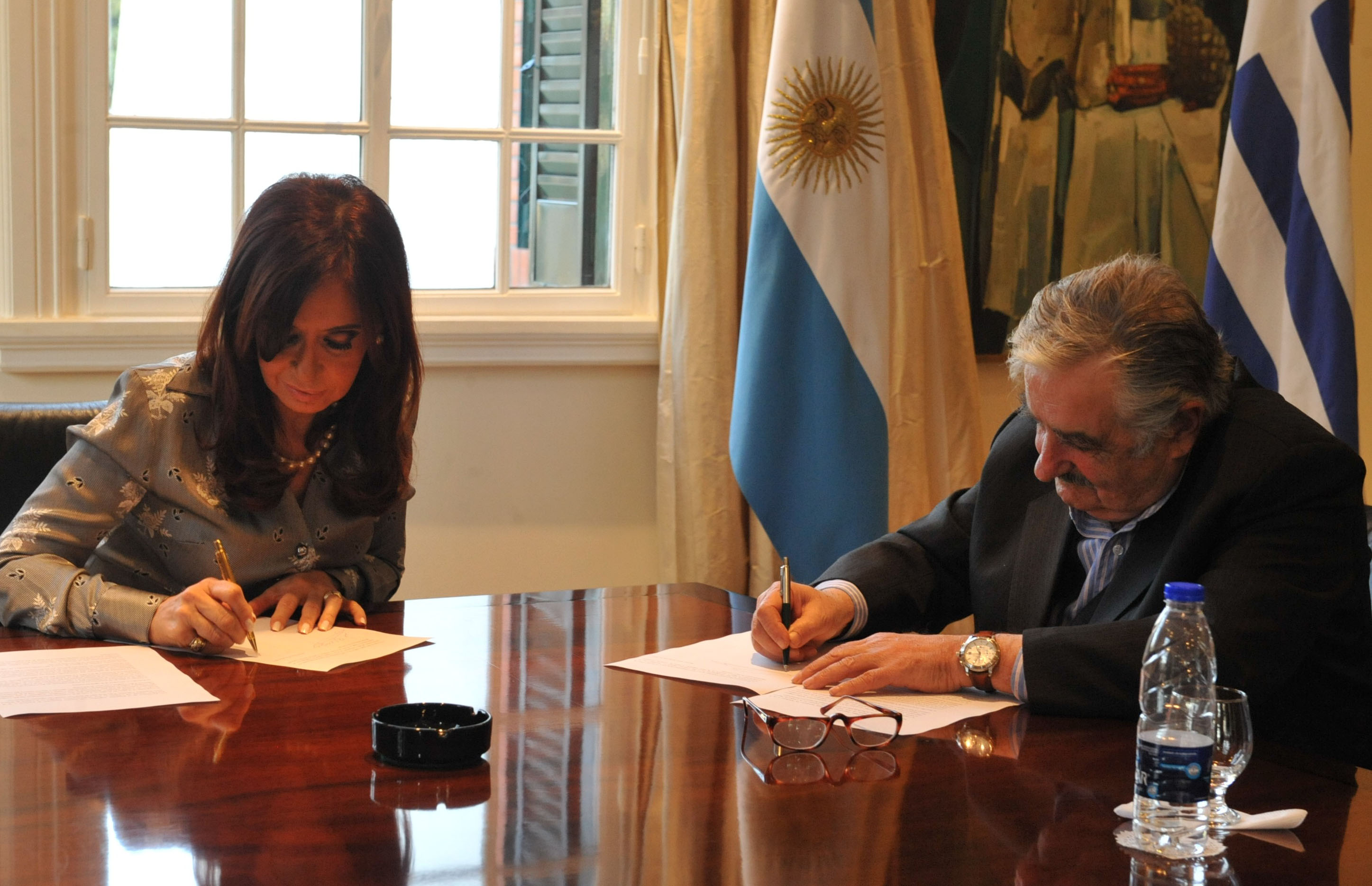
José Mujica and Cristina Fernández signing a joint monitoring agreement of the Uruguay River.

At the beginnings of 2010, after years of blockade by the citizens of Gualeguaychú city in Entre Ríos, Argentina, the international bridge connecting that city to Uruguayan Fray Bentos was reopened, after a Gualeguaychú neighbours' assembly decided by majority to lift it, that would happen under pressure of the administration of Cristina Fernández following the passing of a decree denouncing before federal courts several individuals from Gualeguaychú blockade group for the alleged commission of crimes. The blockade lifting was promoted after talks with President Mujica where he accepted the request from the President of Argentina to perform joint binational controls of the pulp mill, besides that Mujica did not object the designation of Néstor Kirchner, Fernández' husband, as Secretary General of the Union of South American Nations, that it could only be achieved by unanimity or consensus, which until then had been vetoed by former Uruguayan president Vázquez in retaliation for the blockade of the bridges.

=== Recognition of Palestine ===
On 15 March 2011 president announced the official recognition of Uruguay to the State of Palestine as a sovereign and independent state, according to the principles of international law, and the establishment of bilateral diplomatic relations. However, this recognition omitted to say with which borders the State of Palestine was going to be recognized.

Officials from the government of Israel criticized this action, and described it as "a step that will only move away the Palestinians from the peace process instead of encouraging them to return to dialogue", and that the best way to reach a peace agreement is through negotiations and not statements.

=== Reception of Guantanamo Bay detention camp detainees ===
In March 2014, president Mujica accepted the request of the United States government to receive five inmates from the Guantánamo Bay prison, internationally known for the violations of human rights of its detainees. Mujica accepted and stated that he proceeded with Obama's request because it's a matter of human rights, of individuals who were imprisoned for years without having gone through trial.

=== Reception of Syrian refugees ===
During the humanitarian and migratory crisis that arose with the beginning of the Syrian civil war and the war against the Islamic State in 2014, the Uruguayan government expressed its desire to shelter Syrian refugee families from Lebanon to the United Nations High Commissioner for Refugees. After an interviewing process, five families overall consisting of 42 persons were selected, among who there were 33 underaged individuals.

Since they arrived in Uruguay, they were granted permanent residency and provided with accommodation, translation services, access to healthcare, educational and labour adaptation, in addition to receiving a monthly pension whose amount depended on the number of underage children.

At one point these families protested publicly, stating that the country had a high cost of living, the incomes were too low and the job opportunities were few, besides that they were worried about the issue of public insecurity. They also expreseed their outrage saying that they were "deceived" by the Uruguayan authorities about the information about the country they were given and the promises of "an easy life".

Seven years later, in 2022, four of the five refugee families remained in Uruguay and one left the country. After some initial economic troubles, the families that stayed in the country managed to adapt, some of them dedicated themselves to a peasant life and others started to work or study, living this process with a low profile. One of the families obtained legal citizenship, with the right to vote, and Uruguayan passports, and they expressed their desire to remain "in a calm country, with freedom".

=== Other issues ===
In the vote on the draft resolution of the United Nations General Assembly to condemn the annexation of Crimea by Russia, Uruguay abstained, despite agreeing with several of the ideas in the draft, although the Uruguayan representative in the session expressed his position of adherence to international law, that no pronouncement contrary to the Ukrainian Constitution should end with the alteration of the internationally recognized borders of that country nor contravene the principle of territorial integrity of the countries. But other aspects of political nature presents in the draft that was under deliberation, considered inconvenient by Uruguay, led to the abstention.

=== Official international visits ===
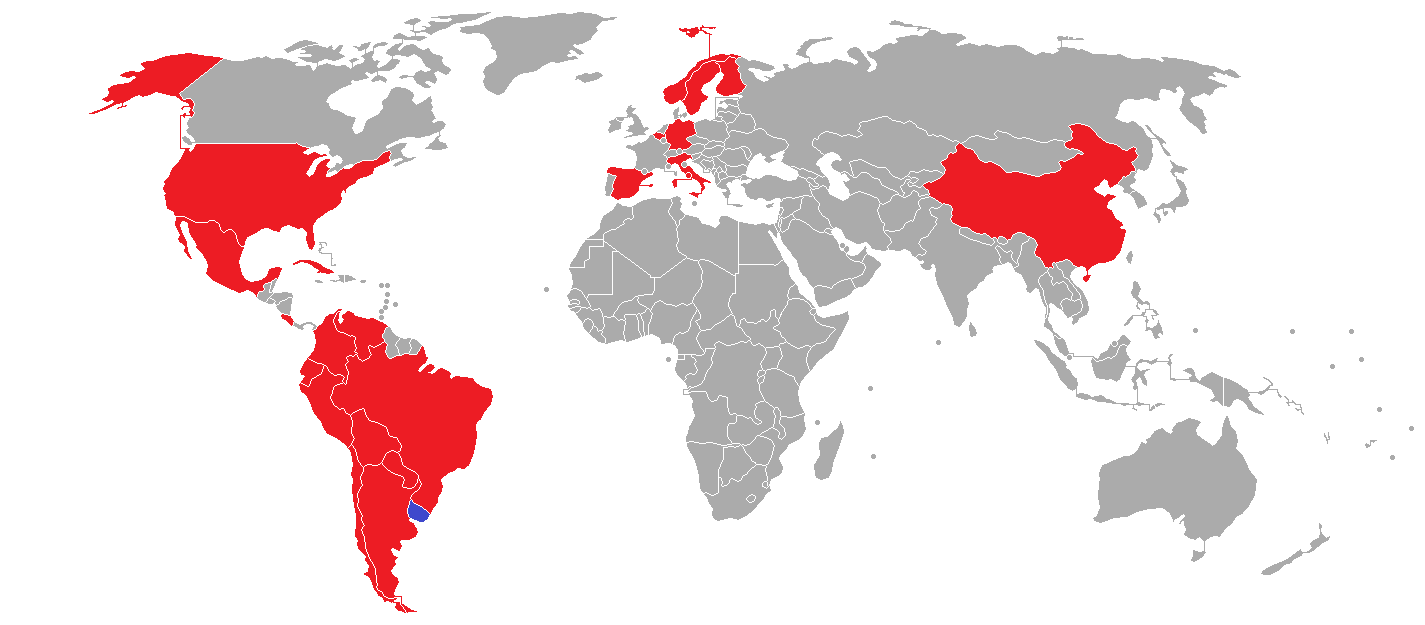
Countries visited by Mujica during his presidency (in red), and Uruguay (in blue).

This is a list of official visits abroad made by Mujica during his presidency (the period from 1 March 2010 to 1 March 2015):

==== 2010 ====
No.	Location	Date	Purpose
1	Chile Santiago	10–12 March	Inauguration of Sebastián Piñera.
1	Bolivia Cochabamba and Santa Cruz de la Sierra	12–14 March	Talks on exports of natural gas to Uruguay.
2	Brazil Brasília	28 March – 1 April	Bilateral meetings.
3	Argentina Buenos Aires	5 April	Talks on dredging the Martín García Channel, the The Hague ruling, and UNASUR.
3	Venezuela Caracas	6–9 April	Institutional, trade, cooperation, logistics, and investment agreements; financing for the purchase of Venezuelan oil.
4	Argentina Buenos Aires	4 May	UNASUR summit.
5	Argentina Buenos Aires	24–26 May	Celebrations of the Bicentennial of Argentina.
6	Argentina San Juan	2–4 August	39th Ordinary Meeting of the Common Market Council of Mercosur.
7	Colombia Bogotá	6–7 August	Inauguration of Juan Manuel Santos.
8	Paraguay Asunción	15–17 August	Bilateral meetings.
9	Argentina Buenos Aires	1 October	Emergency UNASUR meeting following the attempted coup in Ecuador.
10	Argentina Buenos Aires	28 October	Funeral of Néstor Kirchner.
11	Ecuador Guayaquil	16–18 November	Meetings on fuel and medicine exports, bilateral cooperation and joint work, and the future of UNASUR.
12	Spain Madrid	26–29 November	Meetings with potential investors on energy issues, including Florentino Pérez.
13	Argentina Mar del Plata	2–4 December	20th Ibero-American Summit of Heads of State and Government.
14	Brazil Brasília	6–9 December	Bilateral meetings.
15	Brazil Foz do Iguaçu	15–17 December	40th Ordinary Meeting of the Common Market Council of Mercosur.

==== 2011 ====
No.	Location	Date	Purpose
16	Brazil Brasília	1–2 January	Presidential inauguration of Dilma Rousseff.
17	Peru Lima	25–26 January	Bilateral agreements; possible incorporation of Peru into Mercosur.
17	Venezuela Caracas	26–28 January	Signing of bilateral agreements; visit to victims of flooding; visit to the Venezuelan-Uruguayan cultural center.
18	Argentina Buenos Aires	25 February	Agreement on the installation of a regasification plant in Solís.
19	Brazil São Paulo	14–15 March	Negotiation of bilateral agreements on energy interconnection and the automotive sector.
20	Paraguay Asunción	14 May	Agenda items with Paraguay and Bolivia, such as the sale of Paraguayan hydroelectric power to Uruguay through Argentina.
21	Paraguay Asunción	28–29 June	41st Ordinary Meeting of the Common Market Council of Mercosur.
22	Venezuela Caracas	5–6 July	Bicentennial of Venezuelan independence.
23	Peru Lima	27–28 July	Inauguration of Ollanta Humala.
24	Argentina Villa Ángela	26 August	First Regional Exhibition and Third Exhibition of Sustainable Productive Alternatives.
25	Sweden Stockholm	12–13 October	Meetings with Swedish Prime Minister Fredrik Reinfeldt, King Carl XVI Gustaf, and Speaker Per Westerberg. Meeting with the Uruguayan community in Sweden.
25	Norway Oslo	13–15 October	Deepening trade and investment relations. Meetings with President of the Storting Dag Terje Andersen, Prime Minister Jens Stoltenberg, and Crown Prince Haakon Magnus.
25	Germany Hamburg and Berlin	15–18 October	Deepening trade and investment relations. Meeting with Federal President Christian Wulff. Meeting with the Uruguayan community in Germany.
25	Belgium Brussels	19–20 October	Deepening trade and investment relations. Meetings with King Albert II of Belgium, Prime Minister Yves Leterme, President of the European Parliament Jerzy Buzek, and President of the European Commission José Manuel Barroso. Meeting with the Uruguayan community in Belgium.
26	Brazil Porto Alegre	8–9 November	Rio Grande do Sul–Uruguay Business Meeting.
27	Argentina Campana	11 November	Unveiling of the monument Reencuentro con la patria in Campana and award of an honorary doctorate by the National University of Lanús.
28	Mexico Guadalajara	15–19 November	Signing of the Mexico–Uruguay Strategic Cooperation Plan and commemoration of the International Year for People of African Descent.
29	Venezuela Caracas	2–3 December	Summit of Heads of State and Government of the Community of Latin American and Caribbean States and extraordinary meeting of the Council of Heads of State and Government of UNASUR.
30	Argentina Buenos Aires	10 December	Inauguration of Cristina Fernández de Kirchner.

==== 2012 ====
No.	Location	Date	Purpose
31	King George Island, Greenwich Island, and Deception Island	12–16 January	Visit to Artigas Base, Presidente Eduardo Frei Montalva Base, and Captain Arturo Prat Base.
32	Brazil São Paulo	17 January	Visit to former President of Brazil Luiz Inácio Lula da Silva.
33	Argentina Buenos Aires	9 April	Visit to President of Argentina Cristina Fernández de Kirchner.
34	Venezuela Caracas	12–13 April	Visit to President of Venezuela Hugo Chávez.
34	Colombia Cartagena	13–15 April	Participation in the 6th Summit of the Americas.
35	Brazil Brasília	19 April	Deepening Uruguay–Brazil relations.
36	Brazil Rio de Janeiro	20–21 June	Attendance at the United Nations Conference on Sustainable Development.
37	Argentina Mendoza	28–29 June	43rd Ordinary Meeting of the Common Market Council of Mercosur.
38	Brazil Brasília	30–31 July	Attendance at the extraordinary summit meeting of Mercosur.
39	Argentina La Plata	18 October	Attendance at the ceremony in which the National University of La Plata awarded him an honorary doctorate.
40	Peru Lima	29–30 November	Sixth Meeting of the Council of Heads of State and Government of Unasur.
41	Brazil Brasília	6–7 December	44th Ordinary Meeting of the Common Market Council of Mercosur.

==== 2013 ====
No.	Location	Date	Purpose
42	Venezuela Caracas	9–10 January	Participation in the institutional transition process.
43	Chile Santiago	25–28 January	Attendance at the 1st CELAC–EU Summit.
44	Venezuela Caracas	5 March	Trip to the metropolitan airport in Buenos Aires to board Tango 01 and travel to the funeral of Venezuelan president Hugo Chávez.
45	Peru Lima	18 April	Participation in a UNASUR meeting.
45	Venezuela Caracas	18–20 April	Participation in the inauguration of Venezuelan president Nicolás Maduro.
46	China Beijing and Tianjin	24–28 May	Deepening trade and investment relations. Meeting with Chinese president Xi Jinping. Visit to the Great Wall of China.
46	Spain Madrid, Santander, Cádiz, Bilbao, and Vitoria	29–31 May	Deepening trade and investment relations. Meeting with Spanish prime minister Mariano Rajoy and King Juan Carlos I.
46	Vatican City Vatican City	1 June	Meeting with Pope Francis.
46	Spain Madrid, Bilbao, Múgica, Mondragón, Santiago de Compostela, and A Coruña	1–6 June	Deepening trade and investment relations. Visit to Múgica, the town of origin of Mujica's family.
46	Italy Rome and Naples	Cancelled	Trip cancelled for health reasons.
47	Bolivia Cochabamba	4–5 July	Participation in the extraordinary UNASUR meeting to analyze the incidents during a flight of Bolivian president Evo Morales in Europe.
48	Cuba Havana	24–27 July	Deepening trade and diplomatic relations. Participation in celebrations for the 60th anniversary of the Moncada Barracks attack.
49	Paraguay Asunción	15 August	Participation in the inauguration of Horacio Cartes as president of Paraguay.
50	United States New York City	22–27 September	Participation in the 68th session of the United Nations General Assembly.
51	Brazil Brasília	10 November	Meeting with Brazilian president Dilma Rousseff.
52	Venezuela Caracas	12–13 November	Meeting with Venezuelan president Nicolás Maduro. Strengthening trade relations.

==== 2014 ====
No.	Location	Date	Purpose
53	Cuba Havana	27 January – 1 February	Participation in the second summit of the CELAC.
54	Chile Valparaíso	10–12 March	Participation in the inauguration of Michelle Bachelet as president of Chile.
55	United States Washington, D.C.	12–15 May	Meeting with President of the United States Barack Obama and Vice President Joe Biden.
56	Bolivia Santa Cruz de la Sierra	14–15 June	Participation in the G77 + China summit.
57	Brazil Brasília	15–17 July	Participation in the 6th summit meeting of the BRICS and meeting with Russian president Vladimir Putin.
57	Paraguay Asunción	18–19 July	Deepening trade agreements and meeting with Paraguayan president Horacio Cartes.
58	Venezuela Caracas	28–29 July	Participation in the tribute for the 60th anniversary of the birth of Hugo Chávez and in the Mercosur summit.
59	Brazil Porto Alegre	10 September	Deepening diplomatic relations.
60	Finland Helsinki	14–18 September	Deepening trade relations. Negotiations with UPM for the construction of a third pulp mill in Uruguay. Meeting with Finnish prime minister Alexander Stubb.
61	Brazil Brasília	7 November	Deepening trade relations. Meeting with Brazilian president Dilma Rousseff.
62	Venezuela Caracas	2–3 December	Meeting with Venezuelan president Nicolás Maduro. Finalization of ANCAP participation in oil exploitation in the Orinoco Belt. Deepening trade relations.
62	Ecuador Guayaquil and Quito	4–7 December	Participation in the UNASUR summit. Receipt from Suriname of the presidency of that organization and of the South American Defense Council.
62	Mexico Cancún and Veracruz	7–9 December	Participation in the 24th Ibero-American Summit.
63	Argentina Paraná	17 December	Participation in the 47th Mercosur Summit.

==== 2015 ====
No.	Location	Date	Purpose
64	Brazil Brasília	1 January	Presidential inauguration of Dilma Rousseff.
65	Costa Rica San José	28–29 January	Participation in the third summit of the CELAC.
66	Brazil Belo Horizonte	6 February	35th anniversary of the founding of the Workers' Party.

== Controversies ==
=== Cessation of operations of PLUNA ===
On Thursday, 5 July 2012, through a press release, the airline PLUNA’s board of directors announced that it would indefinitely suspend its operations due to the company’s financial situation following the abrupt withdrawal of the private investor Leadgate Investment. On 9 July, the Executive Branch sent a bill to parliament to liquidate PLUNA due to its “insufficient equity”, the airline’s inability to access liquidity, and lack of financing, leaving Uruguay without a flag carrier. Its aircraft remained at Carrasco Airport.

The service with the highest number of daily frequencies operated by PLUNA was the Montevideo–Buenos Aires air shuttle, which would be partially covered by BQB Líneas Aéreas and the Argentine airline Sol Líneas Aéreas.

The cessation of operations generated a significant social impact and dissatisfaction among thousands of passengers. Many were unable to travel or obtain refunds for their tickets. Consumer protection offices in countries such as Uruguay, Chile, and Brazil registered hundreds of complaints from affected users. The National Consumer Service of Chile (SERNAC) filed a lawsuit against PLUNA S.A. due to the lack of solutions for those affected. It is estimated that the number of affected users exceeded 70,000.

Following the airline’s bankruptcy, Aerolíneas Argentinas and Austral increased flight frequencies to meet demand. The Uruguayan government announced that, if the creation of a new national airline did not materialize, the main air bridge between Montevideo and Buenos Aires would be taken over by Aerolíneas Argentinas.

On Monday, 1 October 2012, an auction was held for seven Bombardier CRJ900 aircraft belonging to PLUNA, which were awarded for 137 million dollars to the Spanish company Cosmo Líneas Aéreas S.L. This auction resulted in several irregularities that led to the indictment and resignation of the Minister of Economy and Finance, as well as the president of the Bank of the Republic. The representative of Cosmo and the auctioneer were also prosecuted.

== See also ==
- Pink tide

== Bibliography ==
- Bentancur, Nicolás; Busquets, José Miguel, eds. (2016). El Decenio Progresista. Las políticas públicas de Vázquez a Mujica (in Spanish). Montevideo: Fin de Siglo.
