= Juan Castillo (Uruguayan politician) =

Uruguayan trade unionist and politician

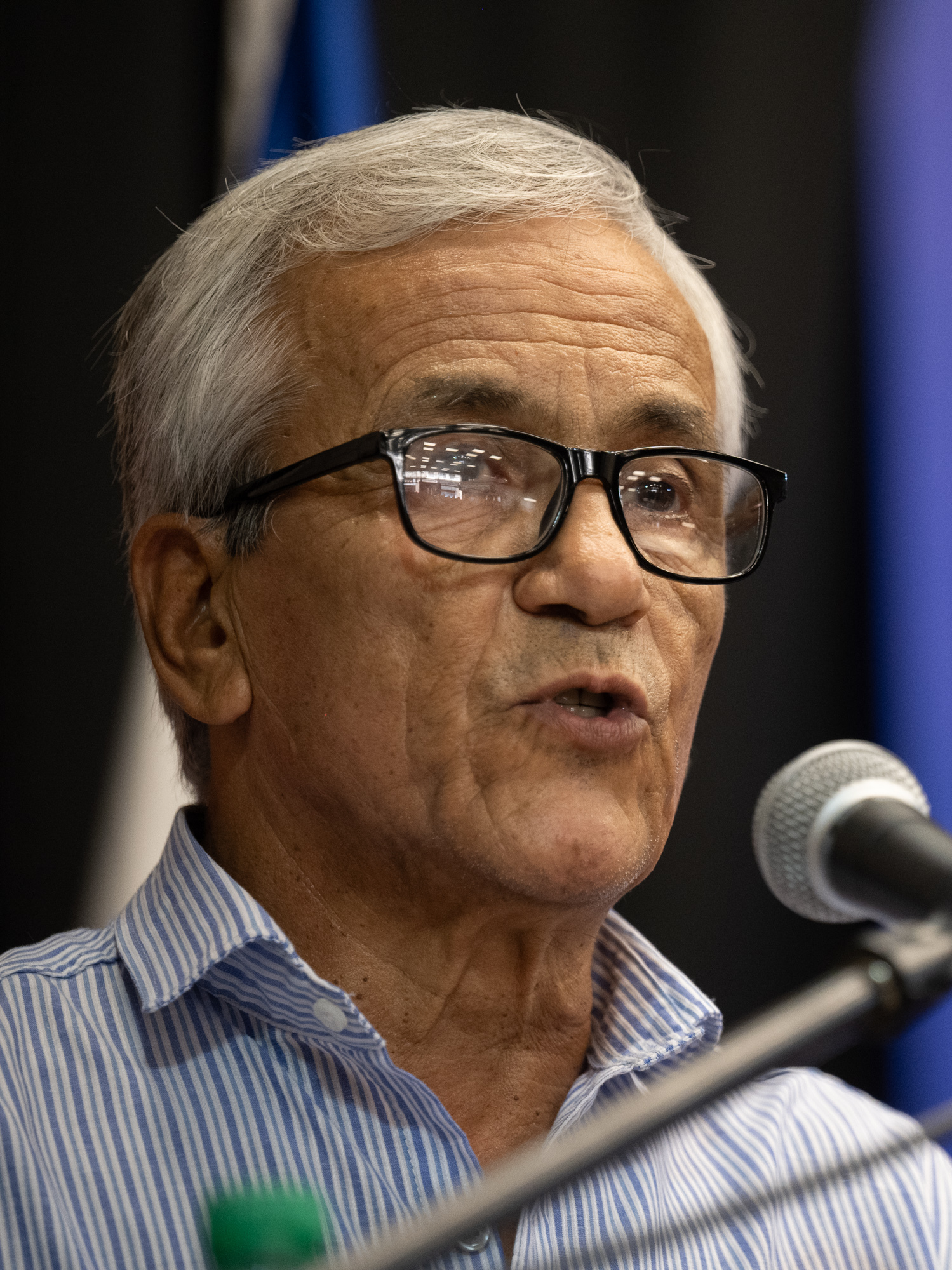
- Castillo in 2025

Minister of Labour and Social Welfare
- Incumbent
- Assumed office 1 March 2025
- President: Yamandu Orsi
- Preceded by: Mario Arizti

Senator of Uruguay
- In office 14 December 2017 – 14 February 2020
- Preceded by: Marcos Carámbula
- Succeeded by: Oscar Andrade

Secretary General of the Communist Party of Uruguay
- In office 18 June 2017 – 21 December 2025
- Preceded by: Eduardo Lorier
- Succeeded by: Óscar Andrade

National Director of Labour
- In office 1 March 2015 – 20 June 2017
- President: Tabaré Vázquez
- Succeeded by: Jorge Mesa

Vice President of the Broad Front
- In office 30 June 2012 – 1 March 2015 Serving with Rafael Michelini (NE), Ivonne Passada (MPP)
- Preceded by: Position Established
- Succeeded by: Blanca Elgart (PS), Sandra Lazo (MPP), José Carlos Mahía (AU)

Personal details
- Born: 29 November 1957 (age 68) La Paz, Canelones, Uruguay
- Party: Communist Party of Uruguay, Broad Front
- Children: 3
- Occupation: Politician, trade unionist, maritime worker

Juan Alberto Castillo (born 27 November 1957) is a Uruguayan trade unionist, maritime worker, and politician who has served as the Minister of Labour and Social Welfare since March 2025, in the cabinet of President Yamandú Orsi.

A longtime leader within the Uruguayan labour movement, Castillo began his career as a dredging operator in the Port of Montevideo and rose to become a key figure in the country's main trade union federation, the PIT-CNT, serving as its General Coordinator for over a decade.

Castillo served as the Secretary General of the Communist Party of Uruguay from 2017 until 2025 and was a Senator of the Republic from 2017 to 2020. He previously held the position of National Director of Labour under President Tabaré Vázquez and was one of the vice presidents of the Broad Front coalition. His political career has been defined and his influence within both the Communist Party and the Uruguayan labour movement.

During his tenure as Minister, Castillo has focused on mediating between trade unions and the government, reducing informal labour, strengthening collective bargaining, and addressing workplace accidents. Ideologically a Marxist-Leninist, he has also supported proposals for a wealth tax to fund social programs and has advocated for advance notice of corporate restructurings to protect domestic jobs.

== Early life ==
Castillo was born in La Paz, Canelones in 1957. He attended School No. 164 in Jardines de Manga until the second grade and completed the rest of his primary education at the School No. 106 in Parque Artigas, Las Piedras. Castillo's parents were supporters of Uruguay's traditional parties. His mother was a National Party supporter who "adored" Wilson Ferreira Aldunate, while his father, a bartender and construction worker, was a Colorado Party supporter who sometimes voted for the Nationals. His parents had seven children.

He attended the University of Labour of Uruguay (UTU) in Las Piedras for his initial training as a lathe operator-mechanic, then continued at the Naval Industries School in Montevideo for his advanced studies, graduating in 1976 as a Naval Mechanic and Machinist. During his studies, his father asked him to drop out of his education and take odd jobs to help support the family, which Castillo initially resisted, feeling frustrated and angry; he eventually balanced both work and school by selling clothes on the street. He completed his practical training aboard fishing vessels and ANCAP oil tankers. In 1978, 21 years old, he was selected to join the Dredging Sector of the Port of Montevideo, having earned one of the top 10 graduating scores at UTU.

His union activity began during the Uruguayan Dictatorship in the port workers' union, during the formative period of the Plenario Intersindical de Trabajadores. He described meeting with fellow unionists during breaks to read and discuss The Communist Manifesto where they would read a page during the half-hour break aloud and comment on it.

== Political career ==
He has been a member of the Broad Front since 1984, a member of the Central Committee of the Communist Party of Uruguay since its 22nd Congress in 1990, and also serves on its Executive Committee. He was a member of the Representative Board of the Inter-Union Plenary of Workers – National Convention of Workers (PIT-CNT) and its Executive Secretariat, holding various roles including Secretary of Organisation, Propaganda, and International Relations. Beginning in 1999, he served as General Coordinator of the PIT-CNT.

In 2008, Castillo became increasingly involved in internal debates within the Broad Front ahead of the 2009 general election. That year he was mentioned as a potential candidate for the presidency of the coalition, though he stated that any decision regarding such a role would have to be determined by the Communist Party of Uruguay. He also participated in discussions about the future leadership of the coalition following President Tabaré Vázquez's term.

At the election, Castillo was elected as a senator but didn't take his seat, stating that he believed he would have more influence from the labour movement to defend workers than he would have in a similar capacity in Parliament.

In 2011, Castillo was one of four candidates running for President of the Broad Front, representing the PCU. The other candidates were Ernesto Agazzi (MPP), Mónica Xavier (PS), and Enrique Rubio (VA). A poll conducted shortly before the election showed Castillo with 11% support among Broad Front supporters, placing fourth. The election also highlighted the Communist Party's organisational strength within the coalition's base structure, with the party presenting candidates in 17 of Montevideo's 18 coordination committees and fielding 38 candidates for the National Plenary—more than any other political sector. Ultimately, Xavier was the successful candidate who offered one of the positions of Vice President of the Broad Front to Castillo. He left his position as coordinator of the PIT-CNT in 2012 to assume one of the vice presidencies of the Broad Front.

=== National Director of Labour (2015–2017) ===
Following the 2014 general election, Castillo was appointed National Director of Labour under President Tabaré Vázquez. The position placed him in charge of overseeing labour relations and negotiations between unions and employers. On 1 March 2015, he was formally appointed into the position by decree of President Vázquez. Shortly after his appointment, he met with representatives of both unions and business groups to discuss ongoing labour issues, including proposals related to weekly working hours.

In July 2015, as the PIT-CNT announced its first 24-hour general strike of Vázquez's term over wage negotiation strategies and minimum wage adjustments, Castillo expressed optimism that the strike could be called off, stating that the government was making "efforts" to accommodate some of the union's requests, particularly those with "good line of argument." The PIT-CNT had called for changes to the government's wage negotiation strategy, including a more accelerated increase to the minimum wage reaching 15,000 pesos by 2018, "special treatment" for wages below that threshold, and a redistribution of wealth whereby "business profits be a little smaller so that wages can be a little better." Castillo acknowledged the union's "nuances and concrete differences" with the government's guidelines while noting the distinct responsibilities of each party in the tripartite negotiations, adding that the government must consider the regional context to develop "the most advantageous conditions for all parties."

In 2016, Castillo was named president of the Rampla Juniors football club. Castillo was soon replaced with Isabel Peña.

In 2017, Castillo found himself at the center of a political controversy. When the government declared education an essential service during a teachers' strike and therefore not allowed to strike—a measure opposed by both the Communist Party and trade unions—he placed his position "at the disposal" of the government rather than resigning outright. The Communist Party held an emergency meeting to discuss his situation, while some union members confronted him at the Ministry of Labour, questioning his commitment to labour principles. Then Minister of Labour and Social Welfare Ernesto Murro did not accept his resignation, leaving Castillo in a uncertain position. The episode sparked broader debate within the PIT-CNT about union representatives simultaneously holding government positions.

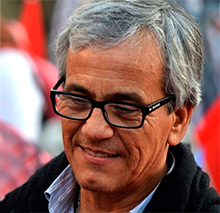
Juan Castillo in 2023.

On 4 June 2017, Castillo was unanimously elected as the Secretary General of the PCU at the Party's 31st Congress. He assumed the position on 18 June, and resigned from his position as National Director of Labour on 20 June to focus on the Secretary General position. Castillo stated that while it wasn't prohibited to hold both positions at once, there was a conflict of interest, stating that "There is an ethical issue of being at the head of the Labour Directorate, which requires maintaining a balance between workers and employers, while being Secretary General of the Party." He was succeeded by Jorge Mesa.

=== Senator (2017–2020) ===
Juan Castillo assumed a seat in the Senate on 12 December 2017, replacing Marcos Carámbula, who resigned from office. The decision for him to take the seat was approved by the Party's Central Committee. He clarified that his succession was part of a planned arrangement and was not related to ongoing judicial proceedings involving the legislator who previously occupied the seat, Michelle Suárez. He lost his seat at the 2019 general election.

=== Minister of Labour and Social Welfare (2025–present) ===
On 1 March 2025, Juan Castillo was appointed Minister of Labour and Social Welfare as part of the newly inaugurated cabinet of President Yamandú Orsi. Shortly after taking office in March 2025, he outlined a strategic plan focused on reducing informal labour, increasing the minimum wage, strengthening collective bargaining, and addressing workplace accidents.

In June 2025, Castillo was elected Vice-President of the 113th International Labour Conference, where he represented Uruguay in international labour discussions.

In October 2025, following blockades at access points to the port of Montevideo triggered by a worker's dismissal, Castillo convened representatives from the Single Union of Cargo Transport (Sutcra) and the affected companies at the Ministry of Labour and Social Welfare (MTSS) headquarters. The union subsequently decided to lift its blockade and return to work, allowing discussions to proceed. Castillo presented a proposal intended to help resolve the conflict, noting that neither party would fully achieve its initial objectives but that the alternative could prevent further disruption, including to the sector's Wage Council negotiations.

Castillo oversaw the continuation of Uruguay's Wage Councils, a system of collective bargaining involving nearly 900,000 workers across more than 160 negotiating tables. By late 2025, he reported that over 50% of the councils had reached agreements, with negotiations proceeding within the established deadlines. Castillo also addressed the issue of child labour, stating that the approximately 40,200 minors engaged in work across Uruguay represent "a true scourge, an outrage," and emphasised the need for concrete measures to prevent exploitation and protect children and adolescents.

In August 2025, Castillo oversaw the launch of the first edition of the "Uruguay Impulsa: Work and Training" program, an initiative aimed at generating job and training opportunities for over 5,000 people across the country. Speaking at the event, he highlighted the high public demand for employment, noting that more than 162,000 individuals had applied, and emphasised the program's dual focus on temporary work and professional training to support participants' future integration into the formal labour market.

In November 2025, Castillo responded to the announced gradual departure of the multinational technology company UKG from Uruguay. He described the news as surprising, noting that the MTSS had received no prior warning from the company and had even recently been informed of its plans to expand and hire more workers. Castillo said the MTSS was actively seeking dialogue with UKG, inviting them to meetings at the National Labour Directorate (DINATRA) to discuss the company's reasoning and explore potential solutions. While he acknowledged that the company ultimately makes its own decisions, the ministry's goal was to keep UKG in Uruguay.

At the 33rd Party Congress of the PCU in December 2025, Castillo was re-elected to the position of Secretary General winning 618 votes, nine more than Senator Óscar Andrade, who received 609. However despite winning, Castillo announced that he would not take the position, and instead became the Secretary of International Relations for the PCU. Castillo stated that he would not be able to fulfill the duties as Secretary General due to his role as a minister. The PCU's Central Committee subsequently appointed Andrade as his successor.

In March 2026, during the presentation of the Labour Conflict Index prepared by the Catholic University of Uruguay, Castillo stated that labour conflict in 2025 had been "moderate," noting that the year had been shaped by the beginning of a new round of wage council negotiations, budget discussions, and the installation of a new government. He defended a proposal by the MTSS requiring companies to provide advance notice to authorities before undertaking major restructurings or closures, arguing that such measures would give the government additional tools to respond to potential job losses. Analysts cited workplace accidents in the construction sector, company closures in industry, and incidents of violence against teachers in education as among the main causes of strike activity during the year.

== Political positions ==
Ideologically a Marxist–Leninist, Castillo supports the strengthening of trade unions, collective bargaining, and social policies designed to protect vulnerable sectors and improve labour conditions.

=== Political philosophy ===
In a 2011 interview with El País, when asked whether the collapse of the Soviet Union and other communist states demonstrated that socialism was a fundamentally flawed economic system, Castillo responded that "I'm not just talking about an economic system. Communism goes beyond that, it's a way of life. This doesn't mean I defend tooth and nail that the entire economy must be state-owned. What I defend is a system that doesn't exploit man, a system where you don't have to go out and work 14 hours a day to take home a shitty 14,000 pesos a month; where I don't have to see a son leave the country to be able to work. Neither can it be said that capitalism is a success. Just as I have to assume and recognise the failure of the Soviet socialist system, don't try to sell me that capitalism is a success. How many millions of unemployed are there? How many children are dying every minute from hunger or lack of water? How many are being bombed right now, at this moment, in the name of peace?"

=== Working hours ===
Castillo supports reducing weekly working hours in certain sectors while maintaining existing salaries, stating that workplaces that had done so were "neither less productive nor less profitable". He has said that such measures should involve dialogue among employers, unions, and the government to ensure successful implementation. He has also indicated that, when salary increases are not possible, reductions in weekly hours could serve as compensation for workers.

=== Wealth and inequality ===
Castillo has criticised the accumulation of wealth among some members of Uruguay's business sector, including those who benefited during Broad Front governments. He has argued that much of this wealth is built on the exploitation of workers and condemned the lifestyles of those living in mansions with high walls and security, calling attention to the country's economic inequality. Castillo stated that fair wages remain insufficient and that those who have profited the most should contribute more to ensure broader social and economic equity. As Minister of Labour and Social Welfare, he has supported introducing a proposed 1% tax on the country's wealthiest individuals as a potential mechanism to fund social programs aimed at reducing child poverty and achieve a more just and solidarity-based society.

=== Venezuela ===
Castillo's views on Venezuela have drawn criticism from political opponents. In January 2025, Castillo stated that it was "the Venezuelans" who had elected Nicolás Maduro to a third term at the 2024 Venezuelan presidential election, asserting that "the Venezuelans have elected this government and this government is being formed." When questioned about the lack of transparency in the Venezuelan election, he argued that opposition candidate Edmundo González "proclaimed himself president and also did not show the electoral records." National Party leader Javier García responded by accusing Castillo of defending "state terrorism" in Venezuela.

In February 2026, following the United States intervention in Venezuela that resulted in the capture of President Maduro by US military forces, Castillo expressed "absolute concern and rejection" of what he characterised as U.S. interference in Venezuelan sovereignty. He condemned the operation as "an attack with weapons and with military personnel inside a sovereign country, kidnapping the president of the republic and his wife," arguing that it violated "the principle of self-determination" and undermined the concept of Latin America as a "zone of peace." Castillo framed the incident as a broader issue of regional sovereignty, stating that "the invasion or the political and military action of a country like the United States, in any country in the Americas, is against all of us." He called for Maduro's release, asserting that the United States "has to grant him freedom, because it is not appropriate for a country to do that," and that Venezuela's political future "will be a problem for the Venezuelans" to decide.

=== Israel–Palestine conflict ===
Castillo has been a vocal critic of Israel's actions in Gaza. In an October 2025 speech commemorating the 105th anniversary of the PCU, he strongly condemned the situation as a "genocide perpetrated against [the Palestinian people] by the State of Israel" by the "ultra-right government of Benjamin Netanyahu, with the complicity of the USA." He has called on Uruguay to officially recognise the events as such under the Genocide Convention.

== Personal life ==
Castillo is married and has three sons. In a 2011 interview with El País, he spoke about his eldest son, who had emigrated to Spain four years earlier seeking work after growing frustrated with low wages in Uruguay, including a minimum wage job at a gas station. Castillo recounted that his son had asked him to use his political connections, which included relationships with President Vázquez and other high-ranking officials, to help him find employment, a request Castillo declined because he believed it would be perceived as political favoritism. He stated that on the left, such favoritism "has always been looked down upon, and you have to be consistent," adding that he thought his son never fully understood his reasoning.

He has also stated that he avoided shopping malls and movie theaters due to past incidents. In the same 2011 interview with El País, he recounted an episode years earlier at the Punta Carretas shopping center, where he was waiting in line at a movie theatre with his family and a man exiting the theater shouted a homophobic slurs at him. Castillo then "went for him right away" and had to be restrained by bystanders.
