= Ivonne Passada =

Uruguayan professor and politician (1956–2023)

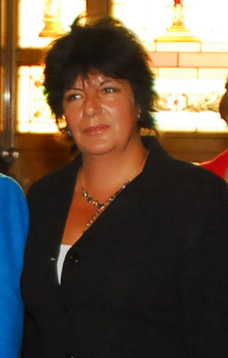
- Passada in 2010

Senator of Uruguay
- In office 2015–2023

Deputy of the Republic
- In office 2005–2015
- Constituency: Montevideo

Personal details
- Born: Ivonne Passada Leoncini; 4 April 1956 Montevideo, Uruguay
- Died: 11 March 2023 (aged 66)
- Party: Broad Front (MPP)
- Occupation: Professor, politician

Ivonne Passada Leoncini (4 April 1956 – 11 March 2023) was a Uruguayan professor and politician belonging to the Broad Front. From 3 March 2015, she served as a senator replacing Eduardo Bonomi, who was ratified as Minister of the Interior for the Broad Front government installed on 1 March.

== Biography ==
Ivonne Passada was born in Montevideo on 4 April 1956. She completed her primary and secondary studies at Colegio Clara Jackson de Heber. She then entered the Faculty of Law of the University of the Republic. However, she ended up studying sociology at the university's Social Sciences Institute, then taking industrial security courses at the Universidad del Trabajo del Uruguay (UTU). Beginning in 1984, she worked as a professor at UTU, and as a teacher of industrial safety, tasks that she performed until 2004.

== Political activities ==
Passada was an active militant of the neighborhood and development commissions of the Malvín Norte area.

From 1984 she was part of the democratic reconstruction of the education unions and the PIT-CNT; she was among the leadership of the Association of UTU Officials (AFUTU) from 1985 to 2002. From 2002 to 2004 she was a member of the PIT-CNT and its Secretariat, being one of the coordinators.

Passada started her militant career in the Tupamaros National Liberation Movement in 1985, and in 2002 she joined the National Directorate of the Movement of Popular Participation (MPP), a political sector of the Broad Front.

In the national elections of 31 October 2004, Ivonne Passada was elected alternate deputy. She assumed the title of deputy on 1 March 2005, when Eduardo Bonomi, for whom Passada was a substitute, became the head of the Ministry of Labor and Social Affairs. Since then she has been a member of the Labor Legislation Commission and the Special Commission on Gender and Equity of the Chamber of Representatives. In 2006 she was elected vice president of the Labor Legislation Commission, and in 2007 she was elected its president.

In the elections of October 2009, Passada headed the MPP list of deputies for Montevideo.

On 15 February 2010, she took office as president of the Chamber of Representatives of the new legislature.

In June 2012, the new president of the Broad Front, Mónica Xavier, took office; three vice presidents were also elected, one of them Passada, accompanied by Senator Rafael Michelini (New Space) and the former coordinator of PIT-CNT, Juan Castillo (Communist Party).

In October 2012, she was nominated to occupy the vice presidency of the Inter-Parliamentary Union, a post for which she was elected unanimously and which she has held ever since.

In the national elections of October 2014, Passada was re-elected Montevidean deputy for Space 609 of the Broad Front, and joined the sector's list to the Senate as the first substitute of the Minister of the Interior, Eduardo Bonomi.

When President Tabaré Vázquez ratified Bonomi as Minister of the Interior, Passada assumed duties as Senator of the Republic as his replacement.

Passada died on 11 March 2023, at the age of 66.
