= Ministry of Housing and Territorial Planning of Uruguay =

Government ministry of Uruguay

Ministry of Housing and Territorial Planning
- Ministerio de Vivienda y Ordenamiento Territorial
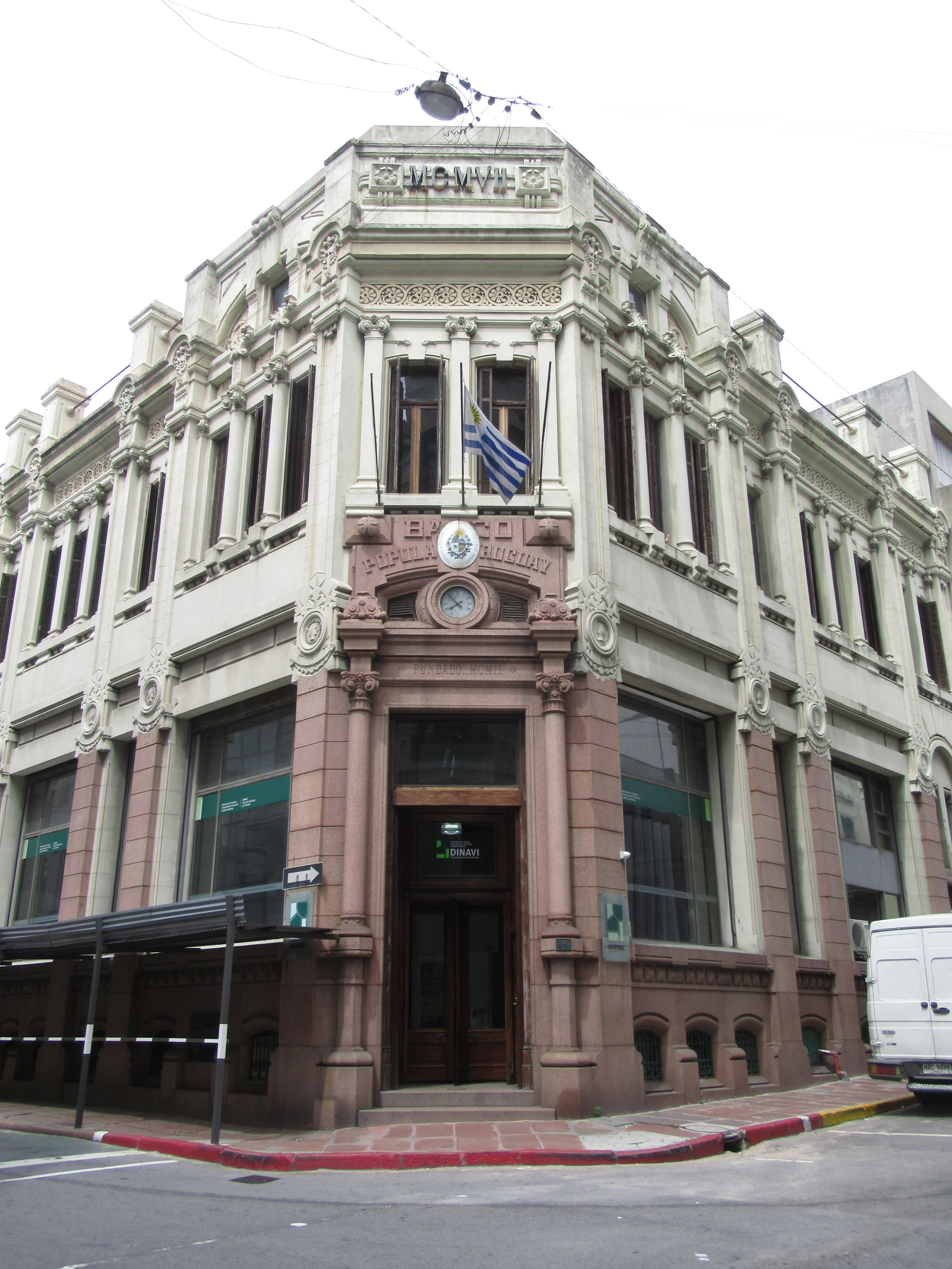
- Headquarters of the Ministry.

Ministry overview
- Formed: May 30, 1990
- Jurisdiction: Government of Uruguay
- Headquarters: Montevideo
- Minister responsible: Tamara Paseyro
- Deputy Minister responsible: Christian Di Candia
- Website: https://www.gub.uy/ministerio-vivienda-ordenamiento-territorial/

The Ministry of Housing and Territorial Planning (Spanish: Ministerio de Vivienda y Ordenamiento Territorial, acronym MVOT) is the Uruguayan government ministry which oversees the housing policies and territorial planning of Uruguay.

The current Minister of Housing and Territorial Planning is Tamara Paseyro, who has held the position since April 22, 2025.

== Background ==
It was created under the Civic-Military Dictatorship in 1974, with the name of the Ministry of Housing and Social Promotion; the ownership of this portfolio fell to Federico Soneira. This Ministry had a short life, being dissolved in 1977.

The current ministry was created on May 30, 1990, in the administration of Luis Alberto Lacalle. The prime minister responsible was Raúl Lago.

In 2020, during the government of Luis Lacalle Pou, it changes its denomination for Ministry of Housing and Territorial Planning, after the creation of a Ministry of Environment.

== List of ministers ==
Minister	Began	Ended
Ministry of Housing and Social Promotion
Federico Soneira	July 12, 1974	June 22, 1976
Ernesto Llovet	June 22, 1976	September 1, 1976
Walter Ravenna	September 1, 1976	June 11, 1977
Ministry of Housing, Territorial Planning and Environment
Raúl Lago	May 30, 1990	February 11, 1992
José María Mieres Muró	February 18, 1992	December 21, 1992
Manuel Antonio Romay	December 30, 1992	March 1, 1995
Juan Chiruchi	March 1, 1995	August 24, 1999
Beatriz Martínez	August 24, 1999	March 1, 2000
Carlos Cat	March 1, 2000	November 13, 2002
Saúl Irureta	November 13, 2002	March 1, 2005
Mariano Arana	March 1, 2005	March 3, 2008
Carlos Colacce	March 3, 2008	March 1, 2010
Graciela Muslera	March 1, 2010	June 14, 2012
Francisco Beltrame	June 14, 2012	March 1, 2015
Eneida de León	March 1, 2015	March 1, 2020
Irene Moreira	March 1, 2020	July 9, 2020
Ministry of Housing and Territorial Planning
Irene Moreira	July 9, 2020	May 5, 2023
Raúl Lozano Bonet	May 9, 2023	March 1, 2025
Cecilia Cairo	March 1, 2025	April 19, 2025
Tamara Paseyro	April 23, 2025	in office

== See also ==
- Cabinet of Uruguay
- List of ministers of housing, territorial planning and environment (Uruguay)
