= Julio Baraibar =

Uruguayan diplomat and politician (1945–2022)

Minister of Labor and Social Affairs
- In office 13 July 2009 – 1 March 2010
- Preceded by: Eduardo Bonomi
- Succeeded by: Eduardo Brenta

Personal details
- Born: 17 October 1945 Montevideo, Uruguay
- Died: 13 November 2022 (aged 77) Montevideo, Uruguay
- Party: MPP
- Occupation: Diplomat

Julio Baraibar (17 October 1945 – 13 November 2022) was a Uruguayan diplomat and politician. A member of the Movement of Popular Participation, he served as Minister of Labor and Social Affairs from 2009 to 2010.

Baraibar died in Montevideo on 13 November 2022, at the age of 77.
