= List of ministers of housing, territorial planning and environment (Uruguay) =

List of ministers of housing, territorial planning and environment of Uruguay since 1990:

Ministers of Housing, Territorial Planning and Environment
Minister	Period
Raúl Lago	1990–1992
José María Mieres Muró	1992
Manuel Antonio Romay	1992–1995
Juan Antonio Chiruchi	1995–1999
Beatriz Martínez	1999–2000
Carlos Cat	2000–2002
Saúl Irureta	2002–2005
Mariano Arana	2005–2008
Carlos Colacce	2008–2010
Graciela Muslera	2010–2012
Francisco Beltrame	2012–2015
Eneida de León	2015–2020
Irene Moreira	2020-2023
