= Ángel María Gianola =

Uruguayan lawyer and politician (1926–2022)

Minister of the Interior
- In office 17 May 1994 – 1 March 1995
- Preceded by: Raúl Iturria
- Succeeded by: Didier Opertti

Minister of Industry and Work
- In office 7 January 1960 – 28 February 1963
- Preceded by: Enrique Erro
- Succeeded by: Walter Santoro

Personal details
- Born: 3 October 1926; José Batlle y Ordóñez, Uruguay
- Died: 31 March 2022 (aged 95); Montevideo, Uruguay
- Political party: PN
- Education: University of the Republic
- Occupation: Lawyer

Ángel María Gianola (3 October 1926 – 31 March 2022) was a Uruguayan lawyer and politician. A member of the National Party, he served as Minister of Industry and Work from 1960 to 1963 and Minister of the Interior from 1994 to 1995. He died in Montevideo on 31 March 2022, at the age of 95.
