= Mariano Arana =

Uruguayan politician and architect

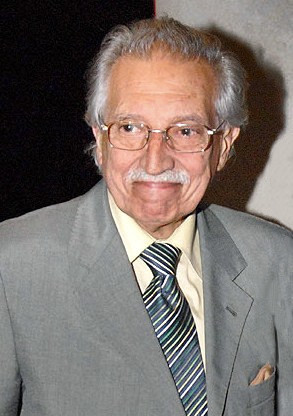
- Arana in 2008

Minister of Housing, Territorial Planning and Environment
- In office 1 March 2005 – 3 March 2008
- President: Tabare Vasquez
- Preceded by: Saúl Irureta
- Succeeded by: Carlos Colacce

Municipal Intendent of Montevideo
- In office 15 February 1995 – 1 March 2005
- Preceded by: Tabaré Vázquez
- Succeeded by: Ricardo Ehrlich

Personal details
- Born: 6 March 1933 Montevideo, Uruguay
- Died: 4 June 2023 (aged 90) Montevideo, Uruguay
- Party: Broad Front
- Education: Liceo Francés Jules Supervielle
- Alma mater: Universidad de la República
- Occupation: Politician, architect, professor

Mariano Arana (6 March 1933 – 4 June 2023) was a Uruguayan architect and politician who served as Intendant of Montevideo from 1995 to 2005. A member of the Vertiente Artiguista–Broad Front, he also served as minister of Housing, Territorial Planning and Environment from 2005 to 2008, and as senator of the Republic from 1990 to 1994 and again from 2008 to 2010.

== Biography ==
Son and grandson of Spanish immigrants, Arana attended the Lycée Français de Montevideo and was a graduate of the Faculty of Architecture of the University of the Republic. He was also a teacher and Director of the Institute of History of Architecture, among the many other activities during college.

Arana was the founder of the Banda Oriental Editions and was chairman of the Comisión de Patrimonio Histórico, Artístico y Cultural de la Nación between 1985 and 1989.

Arana wrote numerous books, ranging from architecture to politics. On the latter subject is his latest book, written jointly with Prof. Oscar Destouet, entitled 5 Vertientes de la Izquierda (5 Slopes of the Left), which is a compilation of information from publications of five leading thinkers of the Uruguayan left: Oscar Bruschera (history teacher), Peter Seré (lawyer, consultant of Liber Seregni), Reina Reyes (teacher), Mario Kaplun (communicator) and Hector Rodriguez (trade unionist, member of the guild of tailors).

Arana died on 4 June 2023, at the age of 90.

== Political activity ==
Arana was the founder and leader of the Vertiente Artiguista (Artiguista Movement), in whose list he was elected senator in 1989, a position he held until 1994, currently held by Eleonora Bianchi. Arana was chairman of the Plenario Departamental de Montevideo of the Frente Amplio and was a candidate for the Frente Amplio in the Intendancy of Montevideo in 1984 and again in 1994, an occasion on which he was elected Intendant with 42% of votes; subsequently he was re-elected in the municipal elections of May 2000 with 58% of the total votes cast.

During his performance as intendant, he implemented the Strategic Plan Montevideo, a plan to renovate the facades of edifices and reorder urban areas of the city.

When Tabaré Vázquez assumed the presidency in 2005, he was appointed Minister of Housing, Territorial Planning and Environment, accompanied by his colleague, undersecretary Jaime Igorra. He served until 1 March 2008, and was succeeded at that time by Carlos Colacce.

Arana also served as a Councillor for the Montevideo Departmental Junta up until his death, after being dropped from the charge of Minister of Housing, Territorial Planning and Environment.
