= Enrique Rubio (politician) =

Uruguayan school teacher, writer and politician

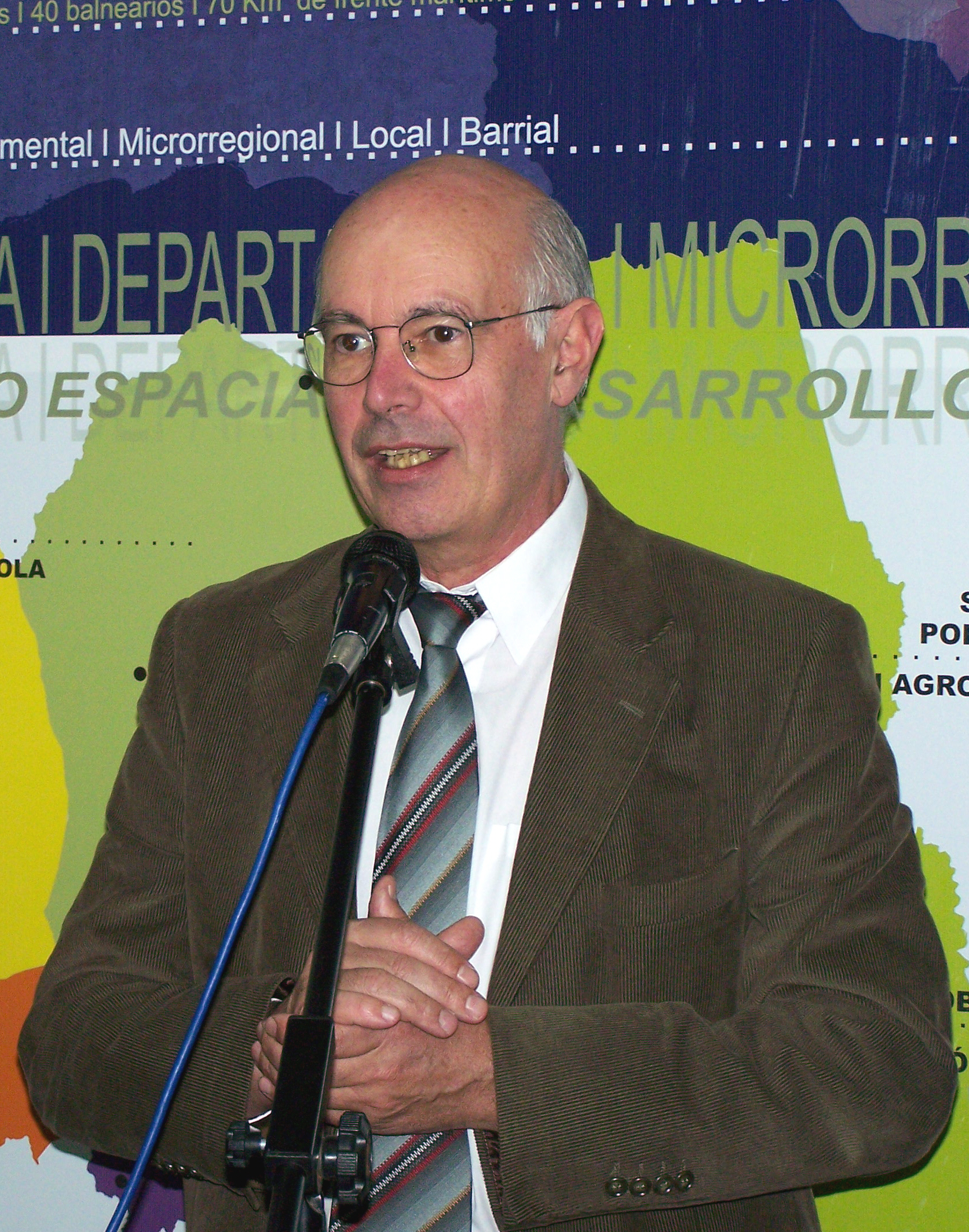

Senator of Uruguay
- Incumbent
- Assumed office 15 February 2000

Director of the Office of Planning and Budget
- In office 29 March 2007 – 31 August 2009
- Preceded by: Carlos Viera
- Succeeded by: Martín Dibarboure

Personal details
- Born: Enrique Vicente Rubio Bruno; 6 April 1943 (age 83) Florida, Uruguay
- Party: Vertiente Artiguista
- Other political affiliations: Broad Front

Enrique Vicente Rubio Bruno (born 6 April 1943) is a Uruguayan teacher, writer and politician of the Broad Front. He served as Director of the Office of Planning and Budget between 2007 and 2009. He is currently Senator of the Republic.

== Biography ==
In his youth he joined the Unifying Action Groups. In 1971, he joined the leftist coalition Broad Front. After the coup d'état of 1973, he was imprisoned for being linked to the Unifying Action Groups cell that operated in the Faculty of Engineering, and for the explosion that killed student Marcos Caridad Jordan while handling material for the manufacture of explosive devices. In 1984, when several political parties were legalized, he participated in the creation of the "Independent Democratic Left" party, better known as the IDI. In 1989, he founded, together with other politicians, the Vertiente Artiguista, a group within the Broad Front. In 1994, he was elected National Representative by Florida Department. While in 1999 and 2004 he was elected Senator.

In the 2009 election, he headed the list to the Senate of the Vertiente Artiguista, being elected for the period 2010–2014.

On May 27, 2012, for the first time in its history, the Broad Front held open elections to elect its highest authorities; Rubio competed for the presidency with Mónica Xavier, Ernesto Agazzi and Juan Castillo. Finally, Monica Xavier was elected.

In the 2019 general election, he was elected senator for the Vertiente Artiguista that won 2 seats in the upper house. The second is occupied by Amanda Della Ventura. The Legislature (2020-2025) began on February 15, 2020.
