= Walter Santoro =

Uruguayan lawyer (1922–2011)

Dr. Walter Santoro

Minister of Industry and Work
- In office 1963–1964
- Preceded by: Ángel María Gianola
- Succeeded by: Francisco Mario Ubillos

Personal details
- Born: April 29, 1922 Santa Lucía, Uruguay
- Died: April 29, 2011 (aged 89)
- Party: National Party (Uruguay)
- Occupation: Politician, lawyer

Walter Santoro Baratçabal (April 29, 1922 – April 29, 2011) was a Uruguayan lawyer and politician who served as the Minister of Labour and Social Security of his nation from 1963 to 1964.

He also served as the interim President of Uruguay for a brief period of time during Luis Alberto Lacalle's presidency.

== Biography ==
Walter Santoro was a member of the National Party, and he played a key role before and after the coup d'etat of 1973. He graduated in Law from the University of the Republic and soon became interested in politics.

Following the Uruguayan dictatorship (1973–1985), he decided to remain out of the political scene as a means of showing his disapproval of the government. This decision earned him many followers, among which there are left-wing politicians such as current president José Mujica.

In 1985, when democracy was eventually restored in Uruguay, Santoro was chosen representative from Canelones Department and served as such until 1990, when he became senator for two consecutive periods, from 1990 to 1995 and from this year to 2000.In 1994 he separated from Lacalle and promotes the presidential candidacy of Alberto Volonté the sector Bootstrap . After serving ten years as senator of the Republic, he retired in 2000 and kept a low profile until the time of his death, which took place in Santa Lucía, southern Uruguay, on April 29, 2011.

Santoro's funeral was celebrated at the Legislative Palace, in Montevideo. His remains are buried at Santa Lucía Cemetery.
