= Juan Andrés Ramírez =

Uruguayan lawyer and politician (1947–2025)

Minister of the Interior of Uruguay
- In office 1990–1993
- President: Luis Alberto Lacalle
- Succeeded by: Raúl Iturria

Personal details
- Born: 11 October 1947 Montevideo, Uruguay
- Died: 3 April 2025 (aged 77)
- Party: National Party
- Spouse: Silvia Saravia Fratti
- Children: Juan Andrés, Gonzalo, Silvia, Margarita
- Education: University of the Republic
- Occupation: Politician, lawyer, professor

Juan Andrés Ramírez Turell (11 October 1947 – 3 April 2025) was a Uruguayan lawyer and politician who served as a Senator of the National Party.

== Background ==
Juan Andrés Ramírez was born in Montevideo, Uruguay on 11 October 1947. He studied law at University of the Republic, becoming a well-known civil lawyer, and soon after became a member of the National Party. In the 1989 general elections, he was elected as a Senator of the Herrerismo faction of the National Party.

Ramírez died of cancer on 3 April 2025, at the age of 77.

== Interior Minister ==
President Luis Alberto Lacalle selected him as Interior Minister of his government; so Ramírez did not take up his Senator post. He was Interior Minister from March 1990 to November 1993, being replaced by Raúl Iturria.

== 1994 Presidential elections ==
Lacalle designated Ramírez as Herrerismo candidate for the 1994 presidential elections. Ramírez lost the elections within the National Party to Alberto Volonté, and the National Party narrowly lost to the Colorado Party.

== Withdrawal from active politics ==
After 1999, Ramírez withdrew from active politics. A member of his faction, Álvaro Alonso, served as Employment Minister in Jorge Batlle's administration from 2000 to 2002. In 2004, he supported Jorge Larrañaga's successful bid for the National Party nomination. Larrañaga lost the general election.

Ramírez worked until his death as a lawyer in Montevideo.

== See also ==
- Politics of Uruguay
- List of political families#Uruguay
