= Jorge Bruni =

Uruguayan politician (1941–2020)

Jorge Bruni (1941 – 13 December 2020) was an Uruguayan politician who served as Minister of the Interior.
