= Francisco Beltrame =

Uruguayan architect and politician

Minister of Housing, Territorial Planning and Environment
- In office 14 June 2012 – March 2015
- President: Jose Mujica
- Preceded by: Graciela Muslera
- Succeeded by: Eneida de León

Personal details
- Born: 1952 (age 73–74) Montevideo, Uruguay
- Party: Broad Front
- Education: University of the Republic

Francisco Santiago Beltrame Echeverría (born 1952 in Montevideo) is a Uruguayan architect and politician.

Graduated from the University of the Republic, he specialised in housing cooperatives. Afterwards, he worked at MEVIR (an organisation in charge of eradicating unhealthy rural houses).

In 2012 he was appointed Minister of Housing, Territorial Planning and Environment, replacing the previous office holder Graciela Muslera.

== See also ==
- Cabinet of Uruguay
