= Ministry of Labor and Social Welfare (Uruguay) =

Ministry of Labour and Social Welfare
- Ministerio de Trabajo y Seguridad Social
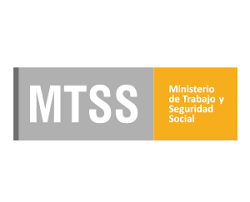

Ministry overview
- Formed: 12 March 1907
- Jurisdiction: Government of Uruguay
- Headquarters: Montevideo
- Minister responsible: Juan Castillo
- Deputy Minister responsible: Hugo Barretto
- Website: Labour and Social Welfare

The Ministry of Labor and Social Welfare (Spanish: Ministerio de Trabajo y Seguridad Social) of Uruguay is the ministry of the Government of Uruguay that is responsible for conducting and carrying out policies related to labor activity in the country, as well as supervising social and food benefits.

This government department is also responsible for acting as mediator of the parties when there are internal conflicts, and defending the rights of workers and enforcing them by their employers. It is the responsibility of the ministry to control the security conditions in the jobs. The Ministry is headquartered in the Juncal Street in Ciudad Vieja, Montevideo. The current Minister of Labor and Social Welfare is Juan Castillo, who has held the position since March 1, 2025.

== History ==
The existence of a government department dealing with labor and social security issues dates back to the creation of the Ministry of Industry, Labor and Public Instruction, created on 12 March 1907 by President Claudio Williman by dividing the former Ministry of Development. On 4 March 1912, President José Batlle y Ordoñez reorganized the Ministry of Industry, Labor and Public Instruction, the Ministry of Industry, Labor and Communications and the Ministry of Justice and Public Instruction.

A new cabinet reshuffle took place under the de facto government of Gabriel Terra in 1936, organizing the Ministry of Industry and Labor and the Ministry of Public Instruction and Social Welfare. After the constitutional reform produced in March 1967, the Ministry of Labor was created, the first holder of the position was Enrique Vescovi, while Héctor Hugo Barbagelata was the first undersecretary. In a final ministerial adjustment in 1974, it generates, from these two departments, the Ministry of Industry and Commerce, Ministry of Culture and Ministry of Labor and Social Welfare.

== List of ministers ==
List of ministers of labor and social affairs of Uruguay since 1935:

Ministers of Public Instruction and Social Provision
| Minister | Period |
| Martín R. Echegoyen | 1935–1936 |
| Eduardo Víctor Haedo | 1936–1938 |
| Toribio Olaso | 1939–1941 |
| Cyro Giambruno | 1941–1943 |
| Luis Mattiauda | 1943–1946 |
| Juan Carbajal Victorica | 1946–1947 |
| Francisco Forteza | 1947–1948 |
| Oscar Secco Ellauri | 1948–1951 |
| Eduardo Blanco Acevedo | 1951–1952 |
| Justino Zavala Muniz | 1952–1955 |
| Renán Rodríguez | 1955–1956 |
| Clemente Ruggia | 1956–1959 |
| Eduardo Pons Etcheverry | 1959–1963 |
| Juan E. Pivel Devoto | 1963–1967 |

Ministers of Industry and Work
| Minister | Period |
| Zoilo Saldias | 1935–1938 |
| Abalcazar García | 1938–1939 |
| Gervasio A. Posadas Belgrano | 1939–1941 |
| Julio Cesar Canessa | 1941–1943 |
| Javier Mendivil | 1943–1945 |
| Rafael Schiaffino | 1945–1946 |
| Hector Álvarez Cina | 1946–1947 |
| Alberto Fermín Zubiría | 1947–1948 |
| Fernando Fariña | 1948–1949 |
| Santiago I. Rompani | 1950–1951 |
| Jose G. Lissidini | 1951–1952 |
| Héctor Grauert | 1952–1955 |
| Carlos B. Moreno | 1955–1956 |
| Fermín Sorhueta | 1956–1957 |
| Héctor Grauert | 1957–1959 |
| Enrique Erro | 1959–1960 |
| Ángel María Gianola | 1960–1963 |
| Walter Santoro | 1963–1964 |
| Francisco Mario Ubillos | 1964–1967 |

Labor and Social Affairs
| Minister | Party | Period |
| Enrique Véscovi | Colorado Party | 1967 |
| Guzmán Acosta y Lara | Colorado Party | 1967 |
| Manuel Flores Mora | Colorado Party | 1968 |
| Julio César Espínola | Colorado Party | 1968–1969 |
| Pedro Cersósimo | Colorado Party | 1969 |
| Jorge Sapelli | Colorado Party | 1969–1972 |
| Julio Amorín Larrañaga | Colorado Party | 1972 |
| Carlos Abdala | National Party | 1972–1973 |
| Marcial Bugallo | National Party | 1973–1974 |
| José Etcheverry Stirling | Without Known Affiliation | 1974–1979 |
| Carlos Maeso | Without Known Affiliation | 1979–1982 |
| Luis Crisci | Without Known Affiliation | 1982–1983 |
| Néstor Bolentini | Unión Patriótica (Uruguay) | 1983–1984 |
| Ramón Malvasio | Without Known Affiliation | 1984–1985 |
| Hugo Fernández Faingold | Colorado Party | 1985–1989 |
| Luis Brezzo | Colorado Party | 1989–1990 |
| Carlos Cat | National Party | 1990–1991 |
| Álvaro Carbone | National Party | 1991–1993 |
| Ricardo Reilly Salaverry | National Party | 1993–1995 |
| Ana Lía Piñeyrúa | National Party | 1995–1999 |
| Juan Ignacio Mangado | Colorado Party | 1999–2000 |
| Álvaro Alonso | National Party | 2000–2002 |
| Santiago Pérez del Castillo | Colorado Party | 2002–2005 |
| Eduardo Bonomi | Broad Front | 2005–2009 |
| Julio Baraibar | Colorado Party | 2009–2010 |
| Eduardo Brenta | Broad Front | 2010–2015 |
| Ernesto Murro | Broad Front | 2015–2020 |
| Pablo Mieres | Independent Party – Coalición Multicolor | 2020 – 2024 |
| Mario Arizti | National Party – Coalición Multicolor | 2024 – 2025 |
| Juan Castillo | Broad Front | 2025 – Incumbent |

¹ Ministers of the Military-Civic government (1973–1985).
