= Eduardo Brenta =

Uruguayan politician

Minister of Labor and Social Affairs
- Incumbent
- Assumed office 1 March 2010
- Preceded by: Julio Baraibar

Personal details
- Born: 8 February 1959 (age 67) Montevideo, Uruguay
- Party: Broad Front

Eduardo Brenta (born 8 February 1959 in Montevideo) is a Uruguayan politician.

A member of the Broad Front, in 1989 he took part in the establishment of the moderate sector Vertiente Artiguista.

In 2010 he was appointed Minister of Labour and Social Welfare.

== See also ==
- Cabinet of Uruguay
