= Carlos Cat =

Uruguayan politician, engineer (1930–2006)

Personal details
- Born: July 2, 1930 Montevideo, Uruguay
- Died: March 28, 2006 (aged 75) Montevideo, Uruguay
- Party: National Party
- Spouse: Amalia Ruprecht Caprile
- Children: Amalia, Carlos, Guillermo, Daniela, Juan, César, Angélica, Santiago, Felipe
- Education: University of the Republic
- Occupation: Politician, engineer

Carlos Alfredo Cat Vidal (July 2, 1930 - March 28, 2006) was a Uruguayan civil engineer and politician.

A member of the National Party, he served as Ministry of Labour and Social Welfare (1990-1991), President of BROU (1993-1995) and Minister of Housing, Territorial Planning and Environment (2000-2002).

He died in 2006, and is buried at the Central Cemetery of Montevideo.
