= Ernesto Murro =

Uruguayan politician (born 1951)

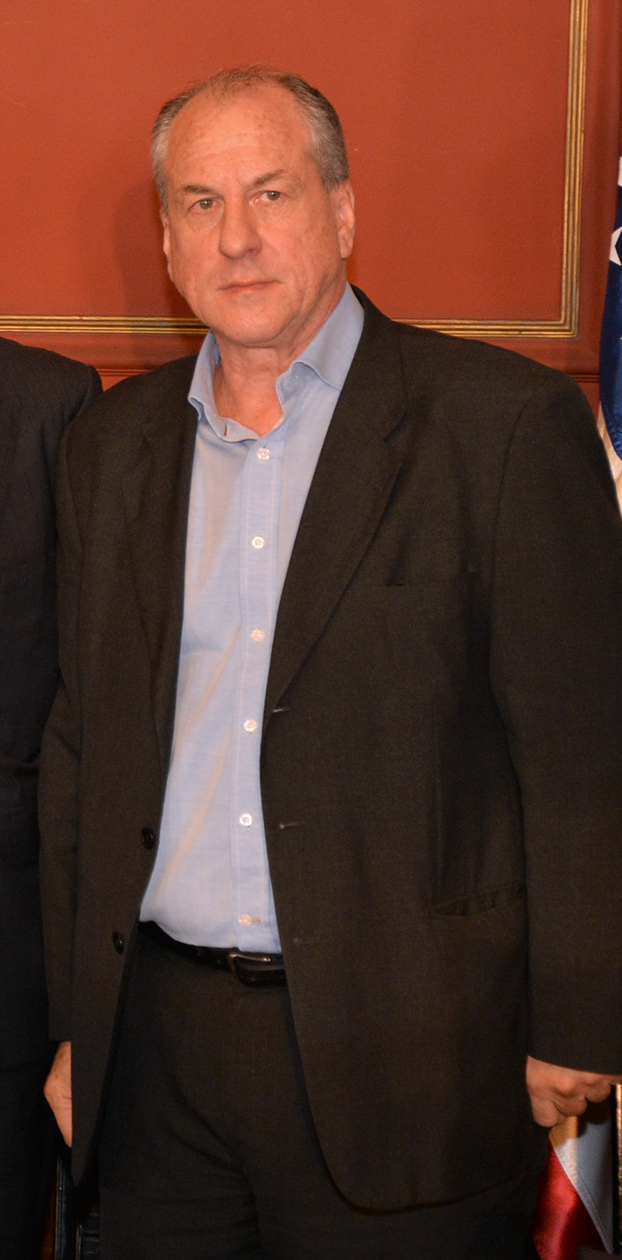
Ernesto Murro

Ernesto Murro (born 1951) is an Uruguayan politician.

He is of the Broad Front, he serves as Ministry of Labour and Social Welfare in the government of Tabaré Vázquez.
