= Ministry of the Interior (Uruguay) =

Government ministry of Uruguay

- Ministerio del Interior

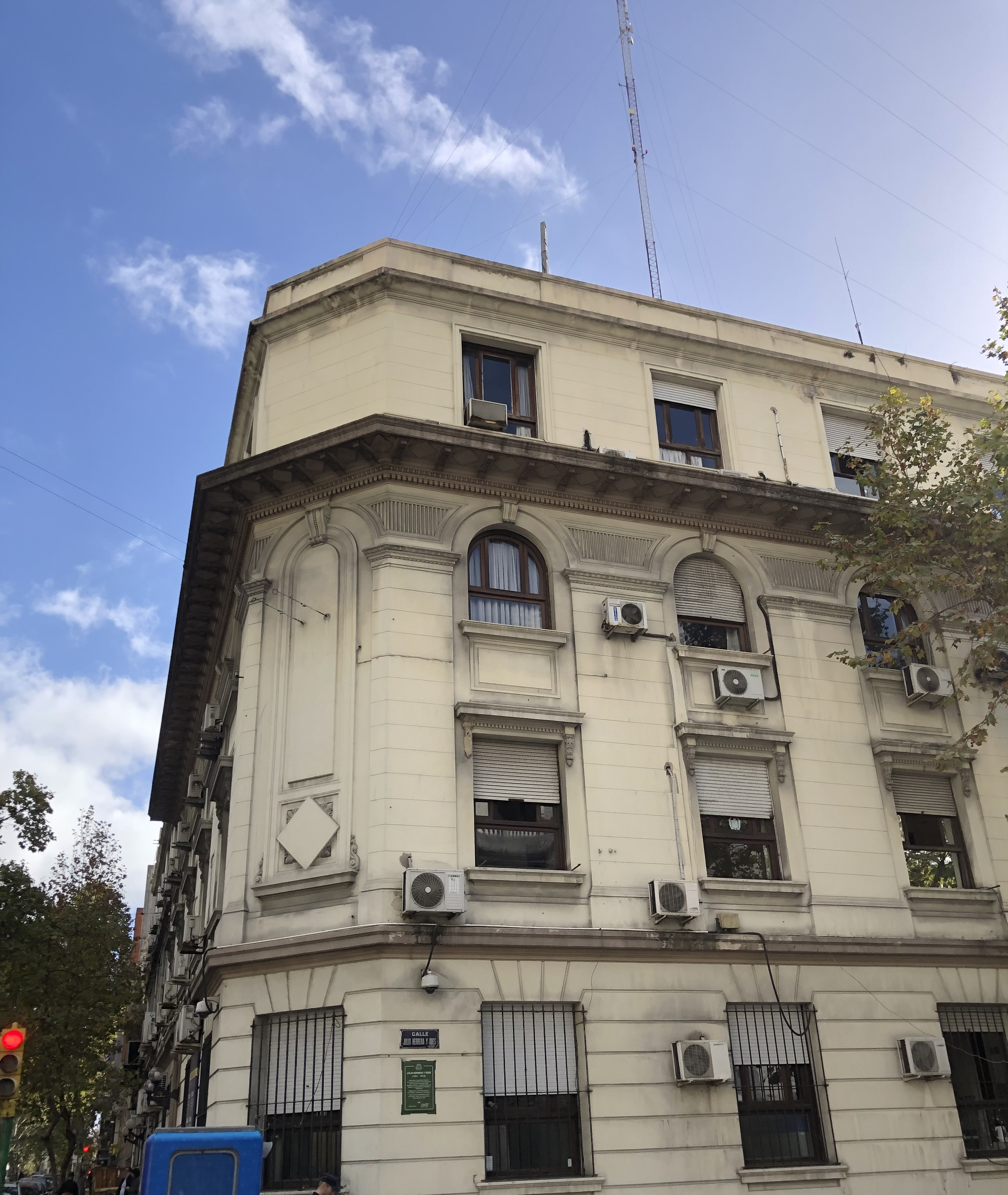

Ministry overview
- Formed: 22 December 1828
- Jurisdiction: Government of Uruguay
- Headquarters: Montevideo
- Motto: Libertad en el Orden (Freedom in the Order)
- Minister responsible: Carlos Negro
- Website: Ministry of the Interior

The Ministry of the Interior (Spanish: Ministerio del Interior) of Uruguay is the ministry of the Government of Uruguay that is responsible for controlling, regulating and evaluating policies, programs and plans related to public safety, as well as guaranteeing citizens the free exercise of fundamental rights and freedoms.

This ministry is in charge of the Uruguayan police force, as well as the fire department. In addition, it is responsible for issuing the identity card and other documents, through the National Directorate of Civil Identification. This government department is headquartered in Mercedes Road in Central Montevideo.

== Creation ==
It was created during the Provisional Government of José Rondeau on 22 December 1828 as the Ministry of Government and Foreign Affairs, but in 1856 it was divided to give rise to the Ministry of Foreign Affairs and the Ministry of Government. In 1943 it is finally renamed as Ministry of Interior.

== Units of the Ministry of Interior ==
- Dirección Nacional de Asuntos Internos: National Internal Affairs Directorate
- Dirección Nacional de Identificación Civil: National Directorate of Civil Identification
- Dirección Nacional de la Educación Policial: National Directorate of Police Education
- Dirección Nacional de Bomberos: National Fire Department
- Dirección Nacional de la Guardia Republicana: National Directorate of the Republican Guard
- Dirección General de Información e Inteligencia Policial: General Directorate of Information and Police Intelligence
- Dirección Nacional del Liberado: National Directorate of the Liberado
- Dirección Nacional de Asuntos Sociales: National Directorate of Social Affairs
- Dirección de Convivencia y Seguridad Ciudadana: Direction of Coexistence and Citizen Security
- Instituto Nacional de Rehabilitación: National Institute of Rehabilitation
- Dirección Nacional de Migración: National Directorate of Migration

== Security Cabinet ==
The Ministry's Security Cabinet has as its main mission the coordination and articulation of actions related to the conservation of order and public safety.

This cabinet is chaired by the Minister of the Interior and is composed, by the Undersecretary, the Director General of the Secretariat, the Director of the National Police, the Director of the Republican Guard, the Chief of Police of Montevideo, the Chief of Police of Canelones, the General Director of Information and Police Intelligence, the General Director of Repression of Illicit Drug Trafficking and the General Director of Combating Organized Crime and Interpol.

== List of ministers ==
List of ministers for the interior of Uruguay since 1943:

Period	Minister	Party
1943–1944	Héctor Gerona	Colorado Party
1944–1947	Juan Carbajal Victorica	Colorado Party
1947–1948	Giordano B. Eccher	Colorado Party
1948–1949	Alberto Zubiría	Colorado Party
1949–1950	José L. Peña	Colorado Party
1950	Alfredo Zubiría	Colorado Party
1950–1951	Dardo Regules	Colorado Party
1951–1952	Juan Francisco Guinchon	Colorado Party
1952–1955	Antonio Gustavo Fusco	Colorado Party
1955–1956	Francisco Gamarra	Colorado Party
1956–1958	Alberto Abdala	Colorado Party
1958–1959	Héctor Grauert	Colorado Party
1959–1960	Pedro B. Berro	National Party
1960	Carlos V. Puig (interino)	National Party
1960–1963	Nicolás Storace Arrosa	National Party
1963–1965	Felipe Gil	National Party
1965–1966	Adolfo Tejera	National Party
1966–1967	Nicolás Storace Arrosa	National Party
1967–1968	Augusto Legnani	Colorado Party
1968	Eduardo Jiménez de Aréchaga	Colorado Party
1968–1969	Alfredo Lepro	Colorado Party
1969–1970	Pedro W. Cersósimo	Colorado Party
1970–1971	Antonio Francese	Coorp.
1971	Santiago de Brum Carbajal	Colorado Party
1971–1972	Danilo Sena	
1972	Alejandro Rovira	Colorado Party
1972–1973	Walter Ravenna	Dictatorship
1973–1974	Cnel. Néstor Bolentini	Dictatorship
1974–1979	Gral. Hugo Linares Brum	Dictatorship
1979–1981	Tte. Gral. Manuel Núñez	Dictatorship
1981–1983	Gral. Yamandú Trinidad	Dictatorship
1983–1984	Gral. Hugo Linares Brum	Dictatorship
1984–1985	Gral. Julio C. Rapela	Dictatorship
1985–1986	Carlos Manini Ríos	Colorado Party
1986–1989	Antonio Marchesano	Colorado Party
1989	Francisco Forteza (hijo)	Colorado Party
1989–1990	Flavio Buscasso	Colorado Party
1990–1993	Juan Andrés Ramírez	National Party
1993–1994	Raúl Iturria	National Party
1994–1995	Ángel María Gianola	National Party
1995–1998	Didier Opertti	Colorado Party
1998	Luis Hierro López	Colorado Party
1998–2004	Guillermo Stirling	Colorado Party
2004	Daniel Borrelli	Colorado Party
2004–2005	Alejo Fernández Cháves	Colorado Party
2005–2007	José Díaz	Broad Front
2007–2009	Daisy Tourné	Broad Front
2009–2010	Jorge Bruni	Broad Front
2010–2020	Eduardo Bonomi	Broad Front
2020-2021	Jorge Larrañaga	National Party
2021-2023	Luis Alberto Héber	National Party
2023-2025	Nicolás Martinelli	National Party
2025-Incumbent	Carlos Negro	Broad Front
