= Enrique Erro =

Uruguayan politician

Enrique Erro (1912–1984) was a Uruguayan politician belonging to the National Party. He began his political activity as a journalist in newspapers such as El Debate and La Tribuna Popular.

A minister of the first National Party government in the 20th century, he resigned due to irreconcilable differences with the mainstream tendencies of the party. In 1962 he quit the National Party and took part in the establishment of the Popular Union; later, in 1971, he joined the Broad Front and was elected senator. Also in 1971, he fought a duel with Danilo Sena, in which neither was injured.
