= Graciela Muslera =

Uruguayan architect and politician

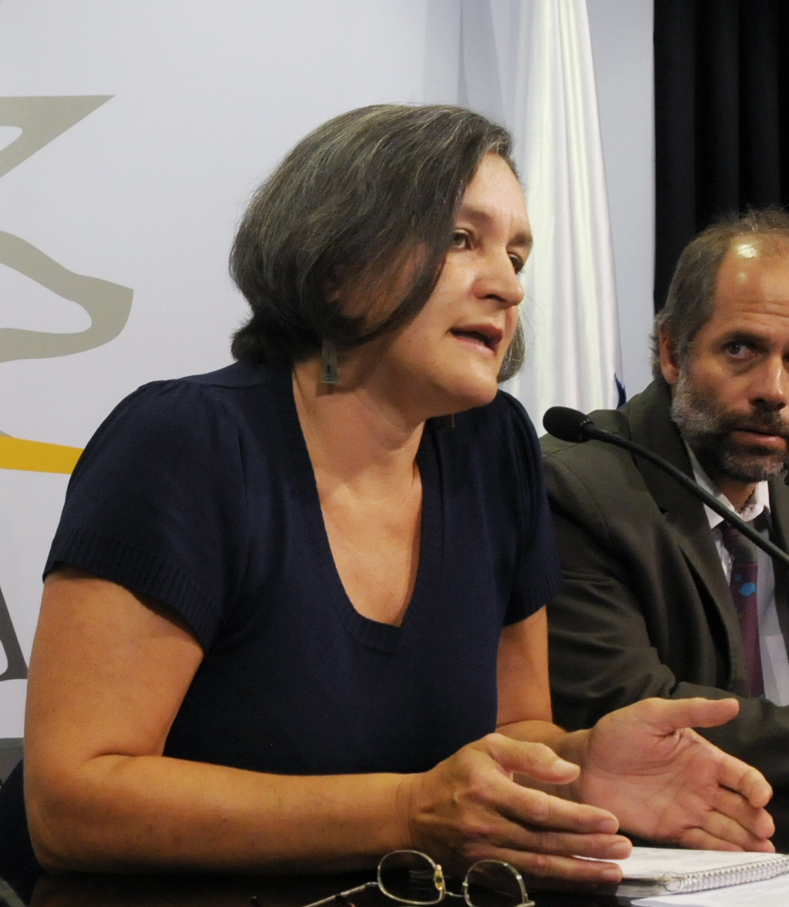

Minister of Housing, Territorial Planning and Environment
- In office 1 March 2010 – 14 June 2012
- President: Jose Mujica
- Preceded by: Carlos Colacce
- Succeeded by: Francisco Beltrame

Personal details
- Born: 1963 (age 62–63) Montevideo, Uruguay
- Party: Broad Front
- Education: University of the Republic

Graciela Muslera Méndez (born 1963 in Montevideo) is a Uruguayan architect and politician.

Graduated at the University of the Republic, she worked at BROU and ANV. In 2010 she was appointed Minister of Housing, Territorial Planning and Environment by President José Mujica. In 2012 she was replaced by Francisco Beltrame.
