= Mónica Xavier =

Uruguayan politician

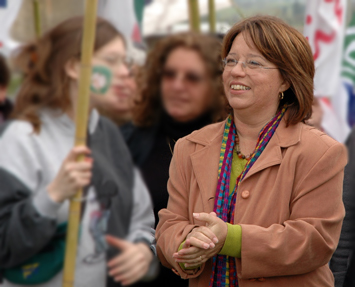
- Mónica Xavier in 2006
- Born: Antonieta Mónica Xavier Yelpo; 16 December 1956 (age 69); Montevideo, Uruguay
- Education: University of the Republic
- Occupations: politician, doctor
- Political party: Broad Front

Antonieta Mónica Xavier Yelpo (Montevideo, 16 December 1956) is a Uruguayan politician and medical doctor with a postgraduate degree in cardiology.

She was the President of the leftist coalition Frente Amplio between 2012 and 2015 and is a serving in the Senate of Uruguay. Xavier was born into a family with socialist roots. She completed all her studies in public education. In 1975, she became a student in the Faculty of Medicine of the University of the Republic, and graduated in 1985.
