= Eneida de León =

Uruguayan architect and politician

- Born: 1943 (age 82–83); Tala, Canelones, Uruguay
- Education: Universidad de la República
- Occupations: architect, politician
- Title: Minister
- Political party: Broad Front
- Children: 2

Eneida de León (Tala, 1943) is a Uruguayan architect and politician.

De León was chairwoman of SODRE. She was also in charge of the restoration of the Solís Theatre and of the final stages of construction of the Adela Reta National Auditorium.

A member of the Broad Front, she served as Minister of Housing in the government of Tabaré Vázquez (2015-2020).
