= Movement of Popular Participation =

Political party in Uruguay

Movement of Popular Participation Movimiento de Participación Popular
- Abbreviation: MPP
- Leader: Yamandú Orsi
- President: Lucía Topolansky
- Founder: Tupamaros; Oriental Revolutionary Movement; People's Victory Party; Socialist Workers' Party
- Founded: 6 April 1989; 37 years ago
- Headquarters: Montevideo, Uruguay
- Ideology: Progressivism; Social democracy; Democratic socialism; Humanist socialism
- Political position: Centre-left to left-wing
- National affiliation: Broad Front
- Regional affiliation: São Paulo Forum
- Chamber of Deputies: 35 / 99
- Senate: 9 / 30
- Intendencias: 2 / 19
- Mercosur Parliament: 5 / 18

Party flag
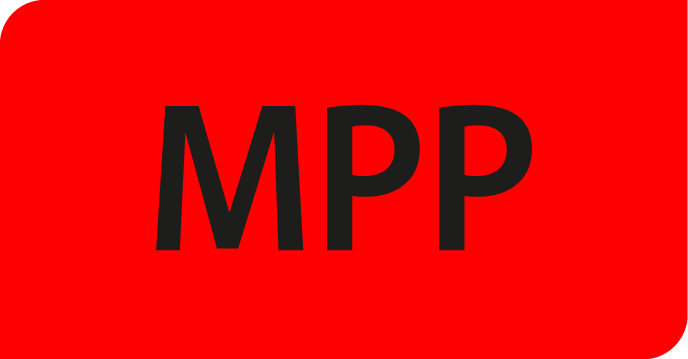

Website
- mpp.org.uy

The Movement of Popular Participation (Spanish: Movimiento de Participación Popular, MPP) is a Uruguayan political party. It is the largest member organisation of the left-wing Broad Front political coalition.

== History ==
From 1985 onwards, after the end of the military dictatorship and the amnesty that freed those Tupamaros imprisoned during the regime, there was debate among different factions within the Tupamaros about whether or not to participate in the legal political system. In the end, those who favored the democratic ways prevailed.

In 1989, the Tupamaros were admitted within the ranks of the Broad Front and, together with other groups of the radical left such as the People's Victory Party (PVP), the Oriental Revolutionary Movement (MRO) and the Socialist Workers' Party, they created the Movement of Popular Participation (MPP). However, the Tupamaros within the MPP declined to participate in the elections. As a result of the legislative elections of 1989, the MPP won two seats in the Chamber of Deputies: Helios Sarthou (a Union lawyer) and Hugo Cores (PVP).

It has since become the largest faction within the Broad Front, the leftist coalition which won the elections in 2004 and took power in March 2005. Its main leader was José Mujica.

In 1992, the MRO decided to leave the MPP (and soon afterwards, the Broad Front) due to political differences with the direction the MPP was taking, stating that "it was growing apart from the ideas of Raúl Sendic regarding the foreign debt, the nationalization of banks and external trade".

In the elections of 1994 former guerrilla members participated in Uruguayan elections for the first time as candidates for Parliament. The MPP gained in votes, thus obtaining two seats in the Chamber of Deputies (José Mujica and Eleuterio Fernández Huidobro) and one in the Senate (Sarthou).

The Fourth Congress of the MPP was held between late 1998 and early 1999. The leadership of the MLN-T, headed by Eleuterio Fernández Huidobro, José Mujica and Eduardo Bonomi, managed to impose within the MPP a strategy of programmatic moderation and support for Vázquez's leadership that had been outlined at the beginning of 1995. Sarthou and Zabalza, emblematic figures of the early years of the MPP, left the MPP.

By 1999, Mujica had become a major political phenomenon, due in part to his blunt style and his clarity. In the elections of that year, Mujica ran for the Senate and the turnout for the MPP increased, giving the party two seats in the upper chamber. The growth in popularity continued so that in 2004 the MPP got six seats in the Senate, and contributed to the victory of presidential candidate Tabaré Vázquez who then became the first left-wing president of the country. During the Vázquez administration, several members of the MPP held key positions. Mujica was Minister of Livestock, Agriculture and Fisheries, and Eduardo Bonomi was Minister of Labor.

Since 2007 new trends within the MPP have led to the creation of the CAP-L, led by Huidobro. In the primary elections of 2009, the MPP reasserted its supremacy as the most important faction in the Broad Front. Mujica quit the MPP after the primary elections so that he would not be tied to any particular group within the Broad Front. He subsequently won the elections in the same year in November.

== Election results ==
=== Presidential elections ===
Election	Party candidate	Running mate	Votes	%	Votes	%	Result
Election	Party candidate	Running mate	First Round		Second Round		Result
1989	Liber Seregni	Danilo Astori	418,403	20.35%			Lost ✗
1994	Tabaré Vázquez	Rodolfo Nin Novoa	621,226	30.6%			Lost ✗
1999	Tabaré Vázquez	Rodolfo Nin Novoa	861,202	40.1%	982,049	45.9%	Lost ✗
2004	Tabaré Vázquez	Rodolfo Nin Novoa	1,124,761	51.7%			Elected ✓
2009	José Mujica	Danilo Astori	1,105,262	47.96%	1,197,638	54.63%	Elected ✓
2014	Tabaré Vázquez	Raúl Sendic	1,134,187	47.81%	1,226,105	53.48%	Elected ✓
2019	Daniel Martínez	Graciela Villar	949,376	40.49%	1,152,271	49.21%	Lost ✗
2024	Yamandú Orsi	Carolina Cosse	1,071,826	46.12%	1,196,798	52.08%	Elected ✓

== See also ==
- Politics of Uruguay
