= Eduardo Bonomi =

Uruguayan politician (1948–2022)

Edison Eduardo Bonomi Varela
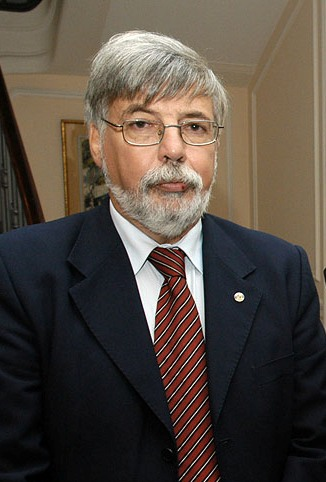
- Eduardo Bonomi in 2007.

Senator of Uruguay
- In office 15 February 2020 – 20 February 2022

Minister of the Interior of Uruguay
- In office 23 July 2019 – 14 February 2020
- President: José Mujica (2010-2015); Tabaré Vázquez (2015-2020)
- Preceded by: Jorge Bruni Machín
- Succeeded by: Jorge Larrañaga

Minister of Labour and Social Welfare of Uruguay
- In office 1 March 2005 – 13 July 2009
- Preceded by: Santiago Pérez del Castillo
- President: Tabaré Vázquez
- Succeeded by: Julio Baraibar

Personal details
- Born: 14 October 1948 Montevideo, Uruguay
- Died: 20 February 2022 (aged 73) Parque del Plata, Uruguay
- Party: Movement of Popular Participation; Broad Front
- Occupation: Politician

Edison Eduardo Bonomi Varela (14 October 1948 – 20 February 2022) was a Uruguayan guerrilla member and politician of the Movement of Popular Participation – Broad Front. He served as Minister of Labour and Social Welfare from 2005 to 2009, and as Minister of the Interior from 2010 to 2020. Since February 15, 2020, he served as Senator of the Republic.

== Biography ==
=== Early life and guerrilla ===
Born in Montevideo, Bonomi attended primary at public school No. 81 and secondary at the public high school in Barrio Malvín in Montevideo. In 1969 he enrolled at the Veterinary Faculty of the University of the Republic where he could only attend up to the fourth year, since in 1972 he was taken to prison for belonging to the MLN-Tupamaros. He was released in March 1985 and was a book seller and, in May 1985, he started working at the Promopes fishing company. In the early 1990s the company became Cooperativa Promopes, a workers' cooperative, which in 1997 was brought up for public auction by its main creditor, Banco de la República Oriental del Uruguay.

Bonomi joined the MLN-Tupamaros in 1970. In June 1972 he went underground. He was arrested on July 21 of that year. After being released, in 1985, he returned to political and social militancy and from 1987 he joined the MLN-T Central Committee. He was one of the co-founders of the Movement of Popular Participacion (MPP).

=== Political career ===
In March 2005, after President Tabaré Vázquez took office, he was appointed Minister of Labour and Social Welfare. In 2009, he resigned his position to serve as Campaign Manager for José Mujica for the general election of that year. He served as Minister of the Interior in the administration of José Mujica (2010-2015) and that of Tabaré Vázquez (2015-2020).

In the 2019 general election, he was elected Senator of the Republic for the 49th Legislature, a position he accessed on February 15, 2020.

=== Personal life and death ===
Bonomi died of cardiac arrest on 20 February 2022, at the age of 73.
