= Environmental issues in Uruguay =

The Uruguayan savanna ecoregion used to be covered by grasslands, palm savannas, and gallery forests along the Uruguay, Negro, Yaguarí, Queguay, and Tacuarembó rivers. Unfortunately, agriculture and cattle ranching have heavily altered these natural communities. The savannas are critically endangered because there are few small isolated patches of intact habitat remaining. The whole ecoregion has been severely altered by cattle ranching, one of the main pillars of the national economy in Uruguay. About 80% of Uruguayan territory is used for cattle ranching on natural and artificial savannas.

Water pollution is another major issue, with around 30% of children in Uruguay having excessive levels of lead in their systems due to the tap water. Other heavy metals from untreated waste, and unregulated discharges from the petrochemical industry and thermoelectric power plants wash into the rivers and sea.

On the positive side, Uruguay has committed to reducing its dependence on fossil fuels, especially in power production, with heavy investment in renewables.

The main state agency in charge of the environment is the National Directorate for the Environment (Spanish: Dirección Nacional de Medio Ambiente, DINAMA) which is part of the Ministry of Housing, Territorial Planning and Environment.

== Current issues ==
=== Pollution of drinking water ===
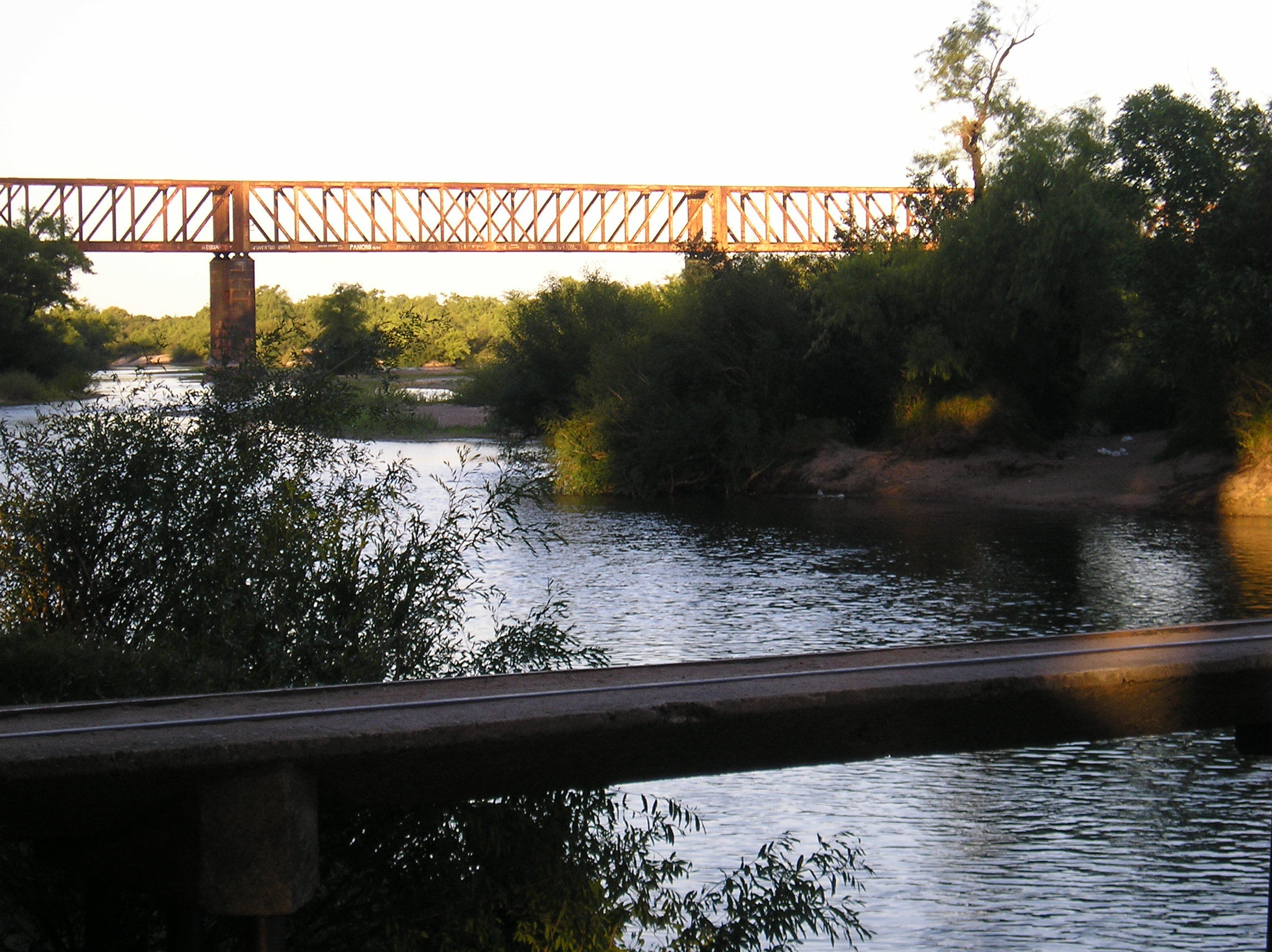
Santa Lucia River

The Santa Lucía River, which could provide over 60% of Uruguayans with tap water, has experienced a significant decline in quality since 2014. Increased dumping from agricultural companies into the sanitary system has raised the amount of toxic waste in the water, and the decrease in rain does not allow the dilution of this waste. Excessive amounts of fertilizers, the dumping of cesspit waste and wastewater treatment plants working to only half of their capacity are also large factors in the pollution of this basin.

The excess of phosphorus in the water is too much to be consumed by phytoplankton (which keep the ecosystem balanced), therefore ends up ruining the water and helps develop cyanobacterias that pollute the drinking water. Most of the waste that is dumped into the basins helps to produce this excess of phosphorus.

A study has shown that children who have water filters in their homes, get better grades in school, no matter their social-economic standing. 30% of children in Uruguay have excessive levels of lead in their systems, due to it being in their tap water. Other heavy metals are also washed into river systems and out into the sea.

=== Lead exposure ===
Most lead exposure in the country is concentrated in Montevideo where most lead-using industries are concentrated. For example, the Radesca S.A. battery factory in Montevideo was one of the worst sources of lead in the country, in part due to poor disposal practices.

In particular, the identification of lead exposure in the neighborhood of La Teja from industrial contamination, lead to the creation of an environmental justice movement in the neighborhood, organized under the community group Comisión Vivir Sin Plomo (Commission to Live without Lead). Uruguayan-American academic Daniel Renfrew claimed that the community created the first environmental justice movement in the country.

After the La Teja episode, government commissions were established and there was public investment in the study and regulation of lead. A clinic was established at the Pereira Rossell Hospital in Montevideo, called the Health Clinic for Environmental Chemical Contaminants, that became a center for treating lead. The founding doctor, Elena Queirolo, continued to find high concentrations of lead throughout the country.

=== Livestock and its effect on water ===
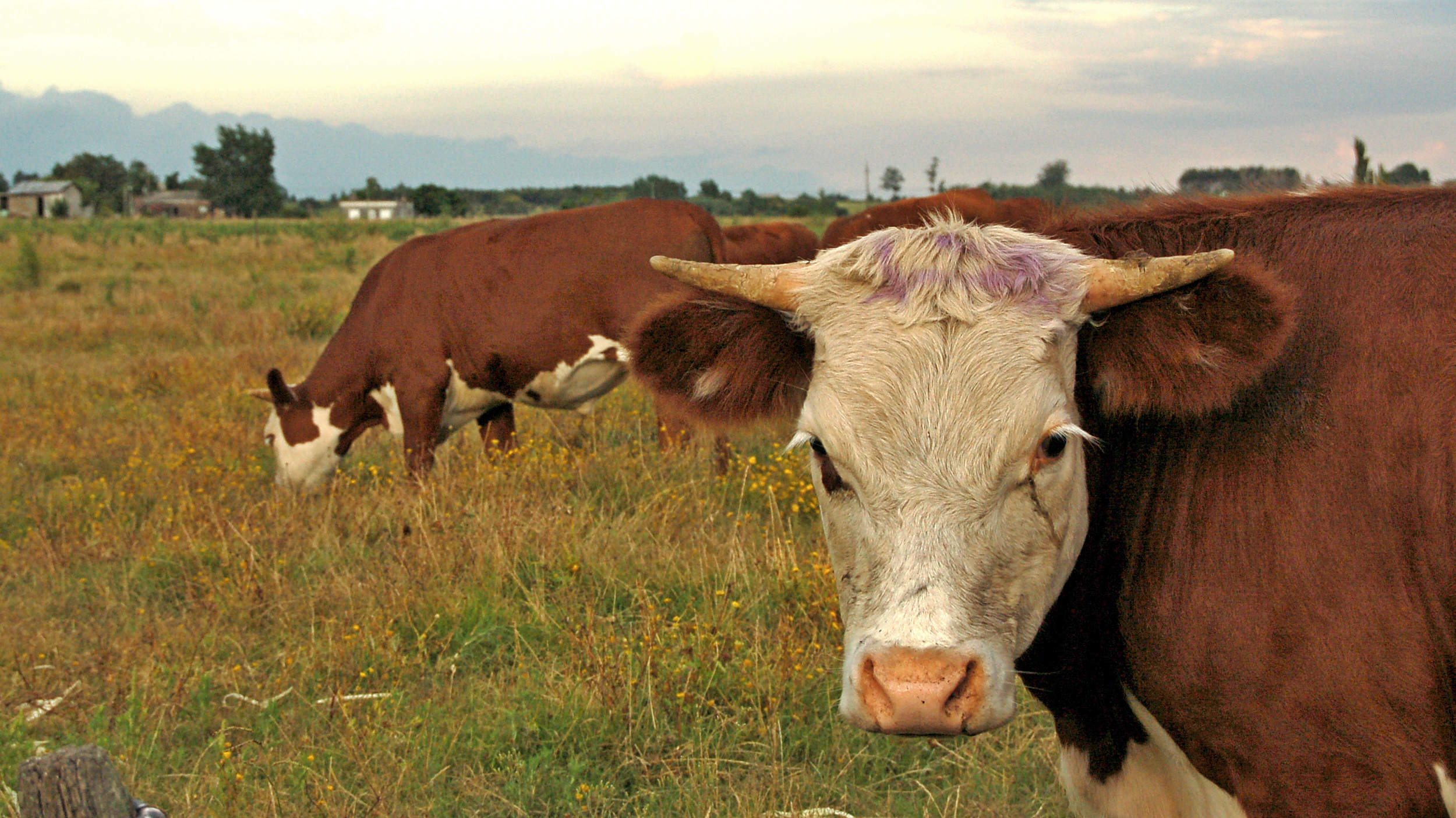
Cattle farm in Uruguay

Worldwide, livestock production is one of the fastest growing agricultural industries. Uruguay has a long history of livestock production, with 70-80% of the land being devoted to pastures, both natural and cultivated; and since 1960, the production has doubled. This puts pressure on the grasslands, and with the soil quality decreasing, fertilizers need to be used to compensate. But this has consequences; the increase in production can cause the crops to drain the local water supply, as it is required irrigation and this makes it difficult for other plants to grow. In addition to this, large areas of forests have been cleared out to create new farmland, to grow food to feed the increasing number of cattle. Excess fertilizer use can cause eutrophication of the aquatic ecosystems, when the excess fertilizers are washed into streams or ponds. It leads to explosive growth of algae, which in stagnant waters may cause oxygen levels to drop and the water becomes uninhabitable to most organisms.

=== Deforestation ===
Forestry is one of the largest growing industries in the country, which has affected the fertility of Uruguayan meadows. Over 10% of Uruguay's forest has been destroyed, yet with the forestation law implemented in 1988 there have been some restrictions on the private sector, by not allowing them to cut an excess of trees.

Uruguay had a 2018 Forest Landscape Integrity Index mean score of 3.61/10, ranking it 147th globally out of 172 countries.

==== Tree cover extent and loss ====
Global Forest Watch publishes annual estimates of tree cover loss and 2000 tree cover extent derived from time-series analysis of Landsat satellite imagery in the Global Forest Change dataset. In this framework, tree cover refers to vegetation taller than 5 m (including natural forests and tree plantations), and tree cover loss is defined as the complete removal of tree cover canopy for a given year, regardless of cause.

For Uruguay, country statistics report cumulative tree cover loss of 439,462 ha (4,394.62 km^{2}) from 2001 to 2024 (about 26.0% of its 2000 tree cover area). For tree cover density greater than 30%, country statistics report a 2000 tree cover extent of 1,693,390 ha (16,933.9 km^{2}). The charts and table below display this data. In simple terms, the annual loss number is the area where tree cover disappeared in that year, and the extent number shows what remains of the 2000 tree cover baseline after subtracting cumulative loss. Forest regrowth is not included in the dataset.

Annual tree cover loss in Uruguay, 2001–2024. View chart definition.
Tree cover extent in 2000 minus cumulative tree cover loss in Uruguay, 2001–2024 (loss-only residual; does not account for gain). View chart definition.

Annual tree cover extent and loss
Year	Tree cover extent (km2) (Note: This residual measure does not include forest regrowth.)	Annual tree cover loss (km2)
2001	16,857.28	76.62
2002	16,788.30	68.98
2003	16,682.19	106.11
2004	16,530.94	151.25
2005	16,371.48	159.46
2006	16,161.10	210.38
2007	15,945.61	215.49
2008	15,708.74	236.87
2009	15,515.62	193.12
2010	15,337.22	178.40
2011	15,057.15	280.07
2012	14,743.12	314.03
2013	14,550.68	192.44
2014	14,294.07	256.61
2015	14,118.19	175.88
2016	13,879.58	238.61
2017	13,660.56	219.02
2018	13,465.25	195.31
2019	13,320.05	145.20
2020	13,192.72	127.33
2021	13,022.37	170.35
2022	12,863.64	158.73
2023	12,654.10	209.54
2024	12,539.28	114.82

=== Pulp mills ===
Botnia was established in Fray Bentos in 2006. It meets all of the environmental requisites proposed by the IFC and the MIGA. It was also shown how Botnia would in fact help the city of Fray Bentos' sanitary system by putting their waste through Botnia's filters. Botnia was sold to UPM in 2009, and they have now also taken the production of biomass energy into their products.

=== Afforestation ===
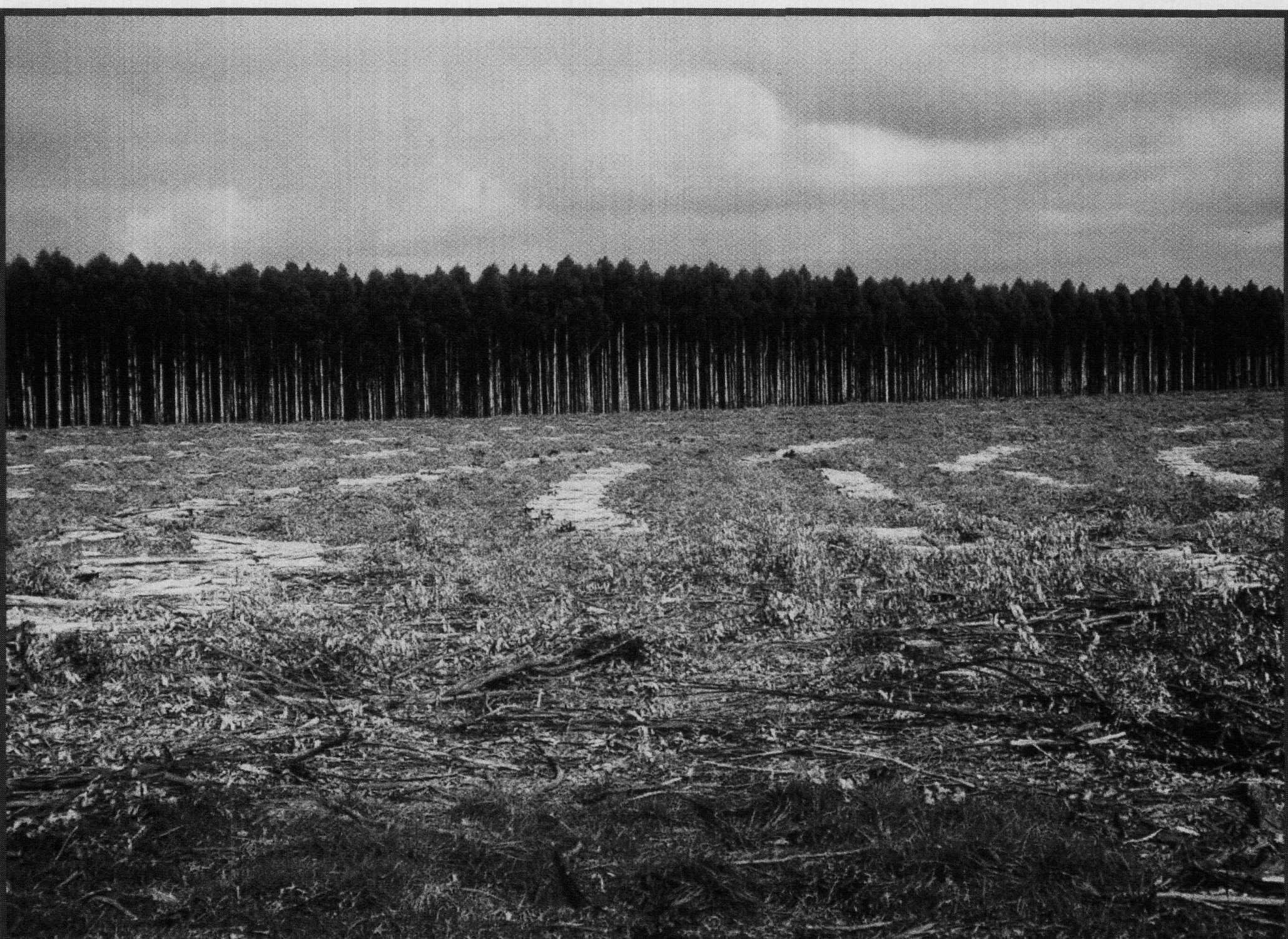
An area of recently harvested plantation.

Uruguay consists mostly of prairie, with only 3.6% of it being high forest. Afforestation is when trees are planted to create new forest areas. But the main problem is the introduction of new non-indigenous species in the process, which, in some areas, are in competition with the local species. Large areas of the prairie land have been converted into forest, mainly for agro forestry, and large quantities of pesticides and herbicides are used to keep the trees from getting affected by pests and weeds, and when these trees are harvested, the land becomes bare, which creates a fire hazard. Afforestation has been further accelerated by the demand for wood by the pulp mills, adding to the damage. The introduction of the new forests may also fragment the existing the native forests, thus affecting the genetic diversity through a process of allopatric speciation.

=== Heavy metal pollution ===
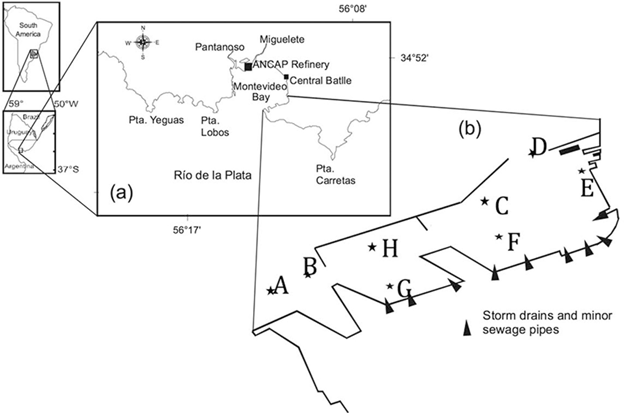
The flow of water into the Montevideo Harbour

Heavy metal pollution in Uruguay can be illustrated by the pollution in Montevideo Harbour, a part of the Montevideo Bay, covering an area of around 12 km^{2}, and a part of the Rìo de la Plata estuary. The bay has an average depth of 5 m and a micro tidal environment, with the wind controlling the hydrodynamics. Untreated waste from the municipalities upstream; as well as industrial discharges from the petrochemical industry, and thermoelectric power plant flow into the bay. It is also the recipient of the water of Pantanoso and Miguelete, two streams with excessive pollutants present in them. Unregulated discharge has led to high level of heavy metals (cadmium, zinc, copper, chromium, lead, silver and mercury) and hydrocarbons accumulating in the water, and these high levels can have horrible effects on the environment and on humans.

The heavy metals usually end up settling at the bottom with the sediment, or being taken up by marine organisms. Although plants and animals require trace amount of heavy metals to live, the excess amounts found in the bay and the surrounding Rìo de la Plata estuary, result in the build-up of concentrations in muscle and liver tissues. This contamination biomagnifies as it travels up the food chains. Humans, being high in the food chain, can find the heavy metals in their food reach poisonous levels. Although some steps have been taken by the government of Uruguay, to assess the heavy metals in the aquatic environment, the effects of its impact on fish and many other members of marine biota have largely been ignored.

=== Climate change ===
Climate change in Uruguay describes the effects of climate change in Uruguay. As the result of global temperature increases, Uruguay is expected to have temperature increases of 3 °C by about 2100 and there is expected increases in precipitation. Increases of climate rain in Uruguay and Argentina during 2018 was estimated by the World Meteorological organization to have caused $2.5 billion in damage.

The main sources of carbon emissions in Uruguay are food production and transport. When compared to the rest of the world, Uruguay only contributes 0.05% of the total global emissions. In 2017, Uruguay identified 106 methods of reducing emissions as part of their Nationally Determined Contributions to the Paris Climate Agreement. Activities include reductions of emissions across food and grain production, increases of native and reforested land, restoration of bogland and grasslands as carbon sinks. The Nationally Determined Contribution began a process of revision in 2020 with the objective to provide greater ambition in 2022.

To pursue climate policy, the country created on the 20th of May 2009, the Sistema Nacional de Respuesta al Cambio Climático y variabilidad (SNRCC) through directive 238/09. The SNRCC produces reportes from monitoring and verification of the work to achieve the Nationally Determined Contribution and other policies.

In 2015, a law transformed that organization into a Secretariat for Environment, Water and Climate change. The Secretariat is charged with coordinating public policy across the three areas. The secretary participates in the committee of other actors in the National Environmental System (in Spanish, Sistema Nacional Ambiental (SNA)). Internationally, Uruguay is part of the Kyoto Protocol, Paris Accorde and the Doha Amendment. The private sector in Uruguay has committed to at least 15 actions to mitigate the effects of climate change, according to the NAZCA portal. Uruguay is also a member of the International Renewable Energy Agency.

== Energy ==
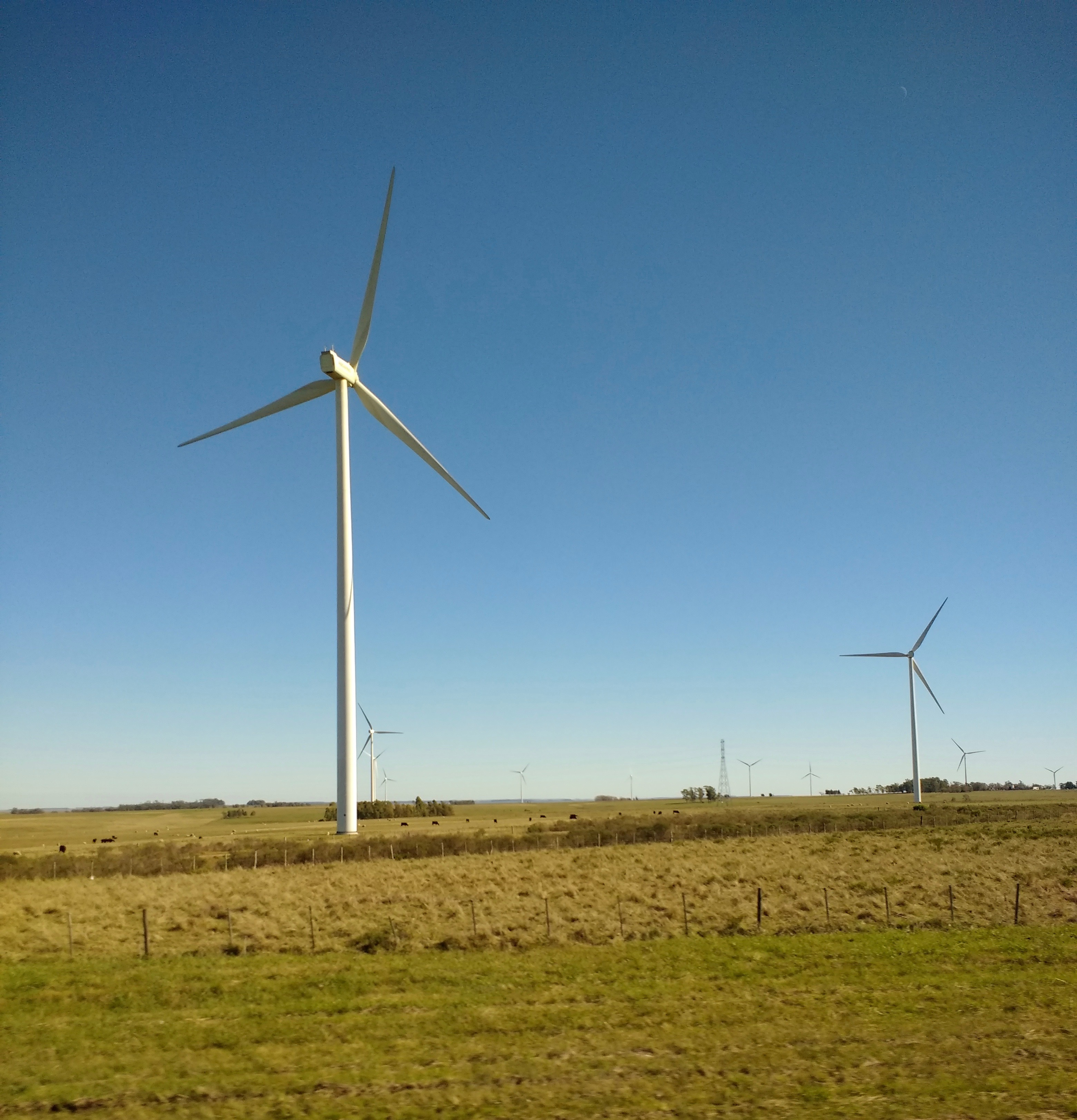
Wind turbines in Tacuarembó Department

Energy in Uruguay describes energy and electricity production, consumption and import in Uruguay. As part of climate mitigation measures and an energy transformation, Uruguay has converted over 98% of its electrical grid to sustainable energy sources (primarily solar, wind, and hydro). Fossil fuels are primarily imported into Uruguay for transportation, industrial uses and applications like domestic cooking. Four hydroelectric dams provide much of the country's energy supply.

=== Wind energy ===
In Uruguay, 22% of the electric energy is produced by wind power. By 2017, they believe that number will grow to 38%, which would make Uruguay second in the world to Denmark. In only 10 years, Uruguay has been able to develop its wind power helping the hydroelectric energy situation that has seen itself in constant decline due to the increasing droughts in the region. In 2005, Uruguay had no electricity generated by wind, in 2015 its output was of over 580 megawatts, and it is predicted that the country will be generating over 2000 megawatts, becoming a world leader in wind energy.

Due to its very flat terrain, Uruguay has a very constant and stable wind power. Uruguayan wind energy generates from 40% to 50% of full capacity, that is if the turbines were constantly moving at full potential. On the other hand, American wind energy generates only 34% of its full capacity.

The entire wind energy project is set to cost 3 billion dollars.

=== Solar energy ===
Uruguay is aiming to develop solar energy in the near future. A private entity called Tecnova Renovables has a solar power plant that now provides the equivalent of the electrical consumption of 100 homes. The government is also developing plans for solar power. The unpredictable nature of solar energy is why the government remains has not invested large amounts in this source.

=== Hydro energy ===
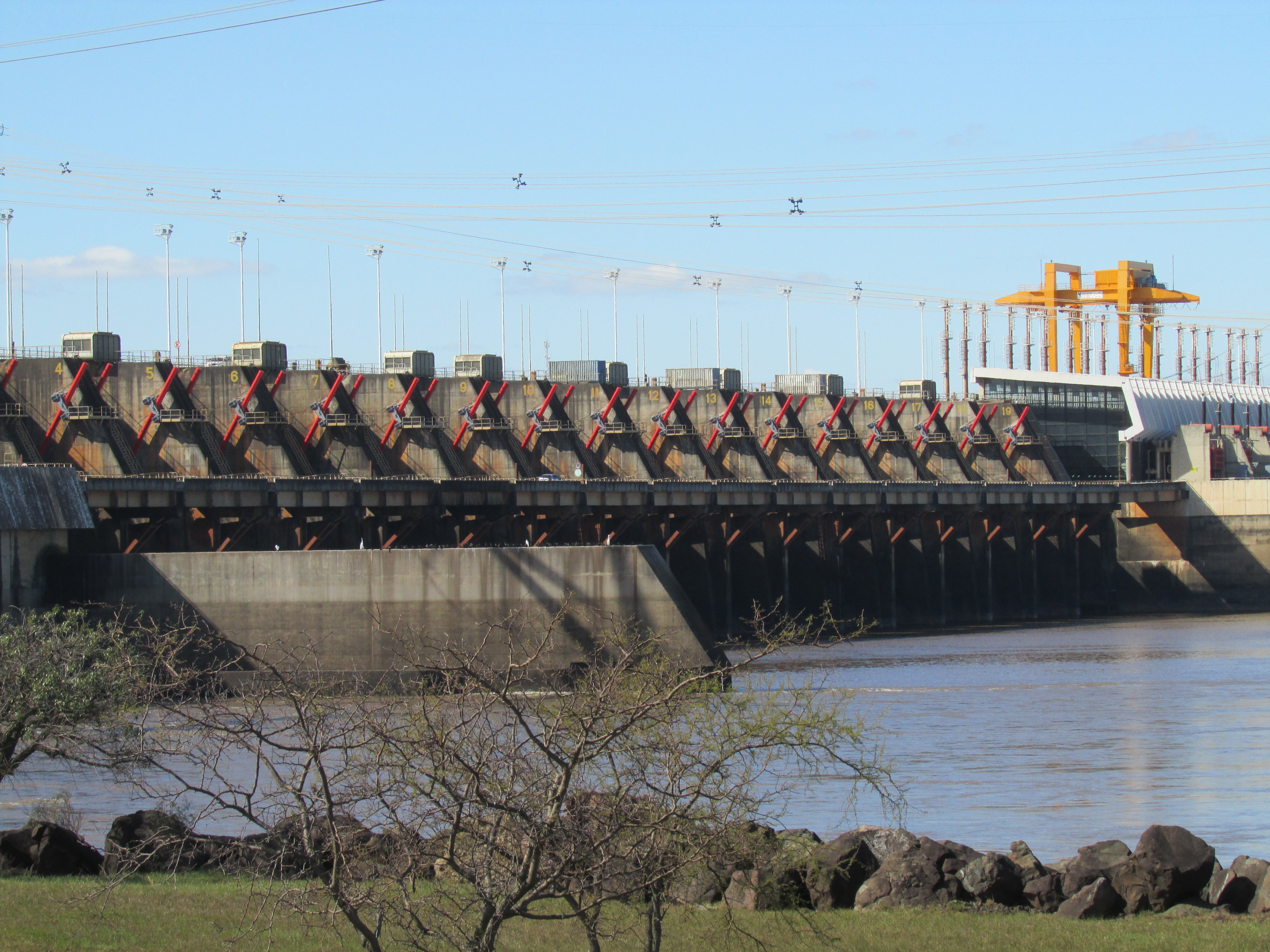
Salto Grande Dam

Hydroelectric energy once produced over half of the sustainable electrical energy for Uruguay. The largest dams are located on the Uruguay River, the biggest being the Salto Grande Dam.

Two more dams will be built in Uruguay, without the moving of any housing or population. Even though these two dams are being constructed, the country intends to move away from hydroelectric energy because of climate change. More and more droughts affect the region and becoming too dependent on these dams has forced Uruguay to purchase great amounts of fossil fuels from other countries to produce electricity.

=== Biomass energy ===
Uruguay possesses very developed forest, cattle and agriculture industries. From being practically nonexistent in 2004, only generating 1% of Uruguay's electric energy, it reached 13% in 2014. The two main agencies that create this energy source are UPM and Montes del Plata, two pulp mills that have great awareness for the environment.

== Agencies ==
The main state agency in charge of the environment is the National Directorate for the Environment (Spanish: Dirección Nacional de Medio Ambiente, DINAMA) which is part of the Ministry of Housing, Territorial Planning and Environment.

== Green parties ==
Green politics did not set roots in Uruguay until in the 1989 election, when the Green Eto-Ecologist Party won 0.5% of the popular vote; in general, environmental organizations have had low political significance, often as part of other bigger parties.

In the 2014 election a new political group, the Ecologist Radical Intransigent Party, took part, led by Cesar Vega. They emphasize the preservation of natural resources and are against open-pit mining.

== See also ==
- Uruguay River pulp mill dispute
