= Plug-in electric vehicles in Uruguay =

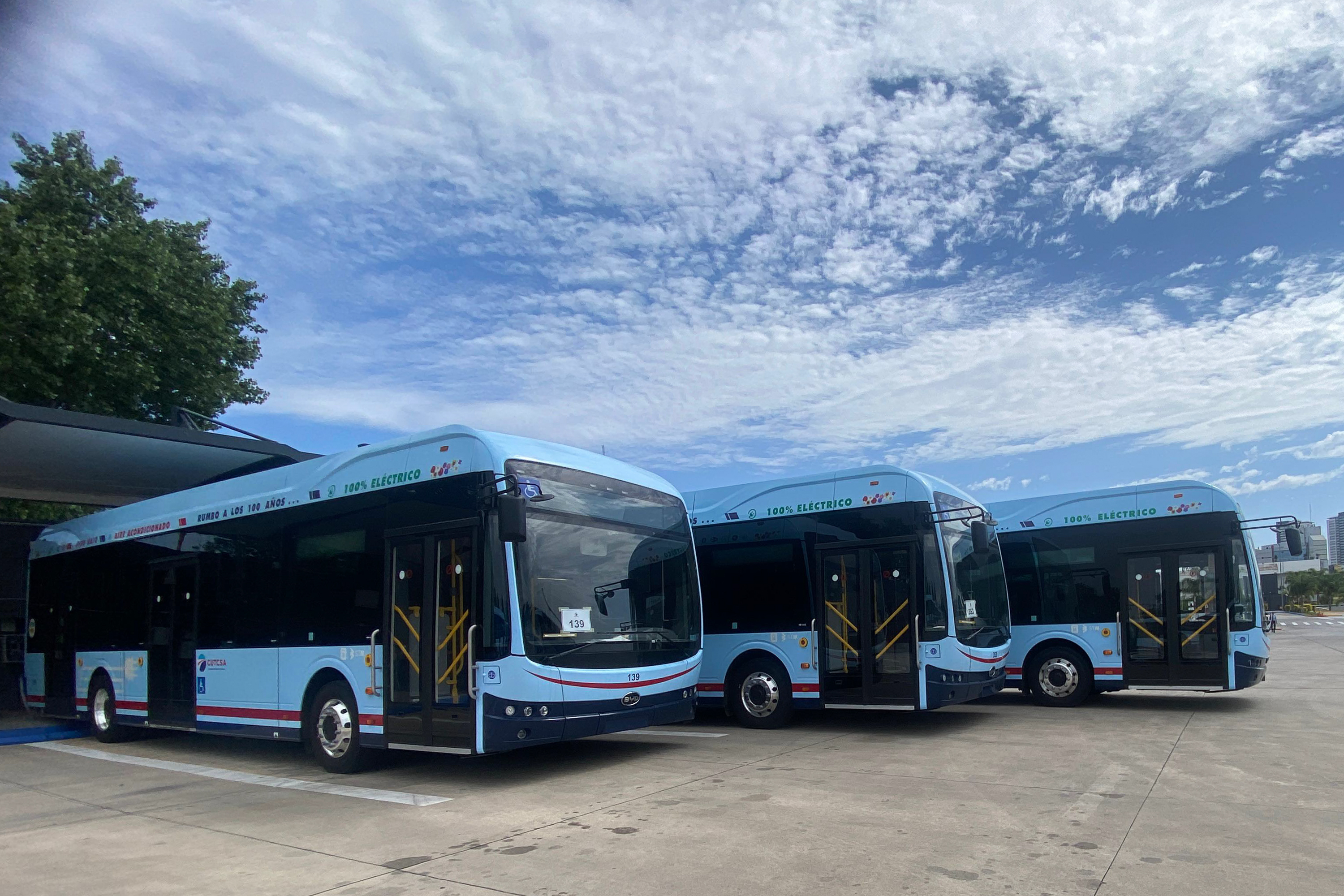
Plug-in electric buses in Montevideo, model BYD K9UD.

Reporting of plug-in electric vehicle sales in Uruguay began in 2019, with 163 vehicles sold. Government financial incentives plus high fossil fuel costs supported a strong annual growth rate, reaching 1,044 BEV vehicles sales in 2022, and a market share of 1.8% of total vehicle sales. To support this continuous growth, the Government extended the tax exemption for the purchase of all-electric vehicles with a retail price of up to US$40.000.

== Market ==
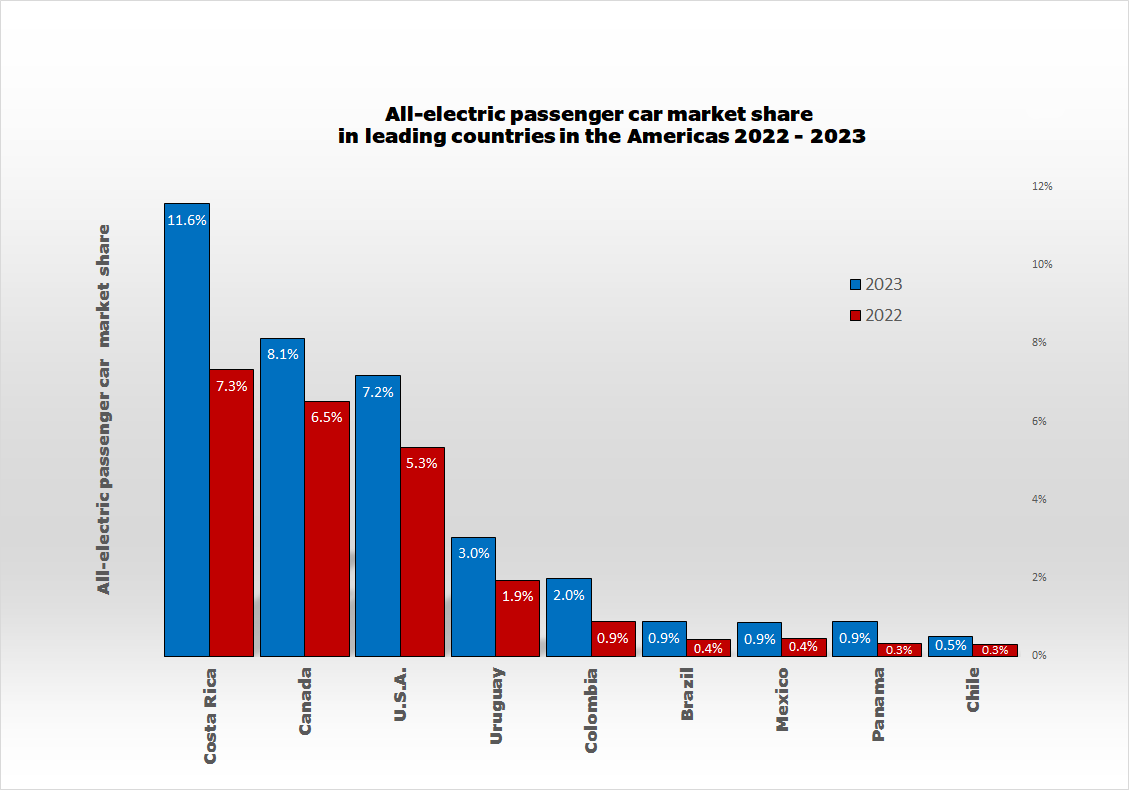
Uruguay ranked as the country with the second largest market share of the all-electric passenger car segment in Latin America, both in 2022 and 2023.

BEV sales in 2023 grew by 80.92% to 1,887, a 3.14% market share of total vehicle sales. Total BEV sales in 2024 achieved 5,856 units, more than three times all electric vehicles sold in 2023 with a market share of 8.9% of total vehicle sales. Growth continued in 2025: by the end of September 2025, cumulative sales of the year achieved 11,381 units, with a market share of 19.6%.

== Public transport ==
=== Taxis ===
The city of Montevideo had by July 2023 140 BEV taxis in circulation (of a total of around 3,000, or 4.7%), with a target to reach 200 by the end of 2023. The Uruguayan government through its Industry Ministry started offering in November 2022 a US$5,000 subsidy (applied as a post-sale rebate) for the replacement of up to 100 thermal taxis and ride-hailing vehicles. Of those 100 subsidies, geographically 93 were allocated to Montevideo and 7 to other departments of the country, while 88 were allocated to replacing ride-hailing vehicles, 11 to taxis and 1 to a remisse. As an additional support, in July 2023 the local government of Montevideo is offering a subsidy of 200,000UYU (approximately US$5,000) for the replacement of up to 85 thermal taxis with electric ones, 30 of which were reserved for taxi cooperatives.

On 21 May 2025, at the presentation of 25 new electric taxis, the Director of Mobility for the city of Montevideo estimated that there were 225 BEV taxis in circulation (about 7.5% of the total). Following the previous successful experience, the national Industry Ministry renewed the plan on 27 September 2024, offering this time a US$4,000 subsidy (again, as post-sale rebate) for the replacement of up to 100 thermal taxis, remisses or ride-hailing vehicles for electric ones; even though the subsidy offered is US$1,000 less than the previous program, as an upgrade the program adds a 20% rebate (up to US$400) for the purchase of a car charger, as well as allowing up to 10 subsidy requests per owner. All of the subsidies of this batch were allocated by 8 April 2025. Due to the fact that many taxi and remisse operators purchase their vehicles under leasing, on 9 December 2024 the Industry Ministry added an additional 50 subsidies to be used exclusively for this financing methodology and only for taxis and remisses; when the initial 100 subsidies are exhausted, the remaining subsidies from this leasing batch are to be allocated to the initial conditions of the program.

As of 22 May 2025, all subsidies have been exhausted. The Industry Ministry is also offering since 5 September 2024 a subsidy (as post-sale rebate) of US$3,000 for the purchase of electric cargo vehicles and 20% rebate (up to US$400) for the purchase of an electric charger, allowing up to 10 subsidy requests per purchaser; as of 3 October 2025, there are 63 subsidies remaining. Focusing on ride-hailing apps, on 15 May 2025 the app Cabify informed that 30% of their rides were done with BEVs, using this opportunity to launch its "ECO" service, using only electric vehicles at the standard service price, while at the same time giving special bonuses for their drivers.

=== Buses ===
==== Montevideo ====
As of 2021 there were 32 BEV buses in operation of a total of 5,391 buses nationwide (including urban, suburban and regional buses). The main urban bus transport company in Montevideo (CUTCSA, with 1148 buses) adhered to COP26 emission targets, pledging to achieve a 25% of BEV fleet by 2025 (around 280 buses), reaching 100% by 2040. On 28 February 2024 the company announced that during 2024 CUTCSA will replace 90 diesel buses for electric ones, also installing a bus charging station next to one of their depots, partially open to other bus companies, and on 29 February 2024 it was announced that those buses will be Higer Azure A12BR, the same model as the prototype purchased by CUTCSA in 2023. The first batch of 50 Higer buses (including 6 double-decker for tourist services), shipped in August 2024, arrived in Montevideo on 16 October 2024 and started operations in November 2024. The second batch of Higer buses (all suburban units) was shipped in December 2024, arriving in Montevideo on 25 February 2025 and starting operations on 24 March 2025.

On 11 April 2024 CUTCSA announced the signature of the contract for the delivery of 100 BYD K9UD electric buses, order starting in 2024 to be completed by June 2025; the company also announced that on 9 April 2024 it signed the purchase of 100 200kWh chargers from the Chinese manufacturer Ekingpow, to be distributed among their depots. On 19 September 2024 BYD delivered those 100 K9UD buses on their factory in Qingdao, China with the presence of CUTCSA authorities, the first 50 arriving on 3 December 2024 and starting operations in January 2025. The second batch of 50 BYD K9UD buses were shipped from Shanghai on 20 July 2025 on Grimaldi's Ro-Ro vessel Great Casablanca, arriving in Montevideo on 1 October 2025, for a total of 221 electric buses for the company (about 19% of the fleet). Furthermore, on 18 September 2024 the company announced the plan to purchase in 2025 the remaining 59 electric buses required to achieve their target of 25% fleet electrification, pending the completion of some infrastructure on their depots. On 8 September 2025 it was announced that the CAF – Development Bank of Latin America had provided a loan to CUTCSA of 20 Million USD, in order to purchase the remaining 60 electric buses to achieve the company's electrification target.

During 2023 the remaining bus companies in Montevideo, COME and transport cooperatives COETC and UCOT selected Yutong as supplier for another batch of locally adapted electric buses (divided windows, different couches, among others), being 9 for COETC, 7 for UCOT and 5 for COME; the first one (a prototype, destined for COETC) arrived in February 2024, while another 19 arrived at late April (a final one, for UCOT, arrived in October 2024).

The local government of Montevideo issued in February 2024 a US$37.3 million bond for the replacement of an additional 90 diesel buses for electric ones (to be distributed 60 for CUTCSA and the remaining 30 among the bus cooperatives), funds to be managed by the local Transport Authority. Also, the national government program "Subite Buses" is funding the investment of several Departments' local governments to purchase 10 additional electric buses in 2023.

==== Interior of the country ====
The local government of Salto expects to receive their subsidized bus in November 2023, expecting to buy an extra 5 units in the short term, achieving an electrification rate of around 13% of the local buses.

On 28 November 2023, the Subite Buses program delivered the first electric buses to de departments of Maldonado, Flores, Tacuarembo and Salto, expecting to deliver buses to the departments of San Jose, Artigas and Río Negro by February 2024.

In Durazno, the local company Nossar purchased two Ankai electric buses for their urban service, which started operations in July 2023. Meanwhile, on 6 February 2024 the Department of Canelones announced the purchase of 8 electric buses (from Yutong, Ankai and Guangdong) for their urban and suburban lines, to be distributed among 5 mass transit companies; those buses were presented on 10 May 2025, also mentioning that an additional bus was being acquired through the "Subite Buses" program.

On 12 October 2025 the company CODESA, which operates urban and suburban transport services in the Department of Maldonado, announced the purchase of 4 Akai electric buses. The national government informed on 20 June 2024 that it was revamping the so called "gasoil trust fund", that helped subsidize the cost of diesel fuel for buses, as well as replacements of units; the new trust fund will stop funding new diesel buses, accepting only new electric buses to receive the subsidy (all previously funded buses will continue to receive funding).

== Charging network ==
Alongside the increasing sales there has been a strong expansion of the charging network: on 27 July 2025 it was reported that there were 460 charging points in the country, with 363 being managed by UTE and the remaining by private companies; additionally, UTE plans to install 70 new fast chargers during the rest of the year, focusing on densification of the network in an attempt to reduce the network constraints.

On 19 March 2024 the 300th charger was turned on in the city of Trinidad, Flores Department, by the President of the Republic, Luis Lacalle Pou. On 15 May 2024 Silvia Emaldi, the president of the national electric company (UTE), indicated that the country had decided to implement the European standard for the chargers, basically Type 2 and CCS2, but will maintain the ones already installed that had the Chinese standard so that older vehicles could use the network.

The government is also creating incentives so private companies can install charging stations throughout the country, and the national electric company (UTE) announced that from 15 November 2023 to end of June 2024 there will be a rebate of 4,048UYU (about US$100) for domestic consumers that install a car charger at their homes. On 15 March 2024 the company Evergo, working with local renewable energy company Ventus, announced plans for a private network of electric chargers, investing u$s 5M to achieve the installation of 240 chargers throughout the country in three years (around 80 per year), of which 40% will have 50 kW of power, while the 60% remaining will have 20 kW. On 13 September 2024 another company, eOne, announced a plan for the installation of 100 DC fast chargers in the following 12 months, starting with a 5-charger station and following up with 18 additional chargers in 2024. On 21 November 2024 UTE opened the first ultra-fast DC charging station in Montevideo (up to 480kW) donated by Huawei; initially with two charging ports, the station (powered at 600kW but upgradeable to 720kW) is expected to increase its size to 12 charging ports in the near term.
