= Energy in Uruguay =

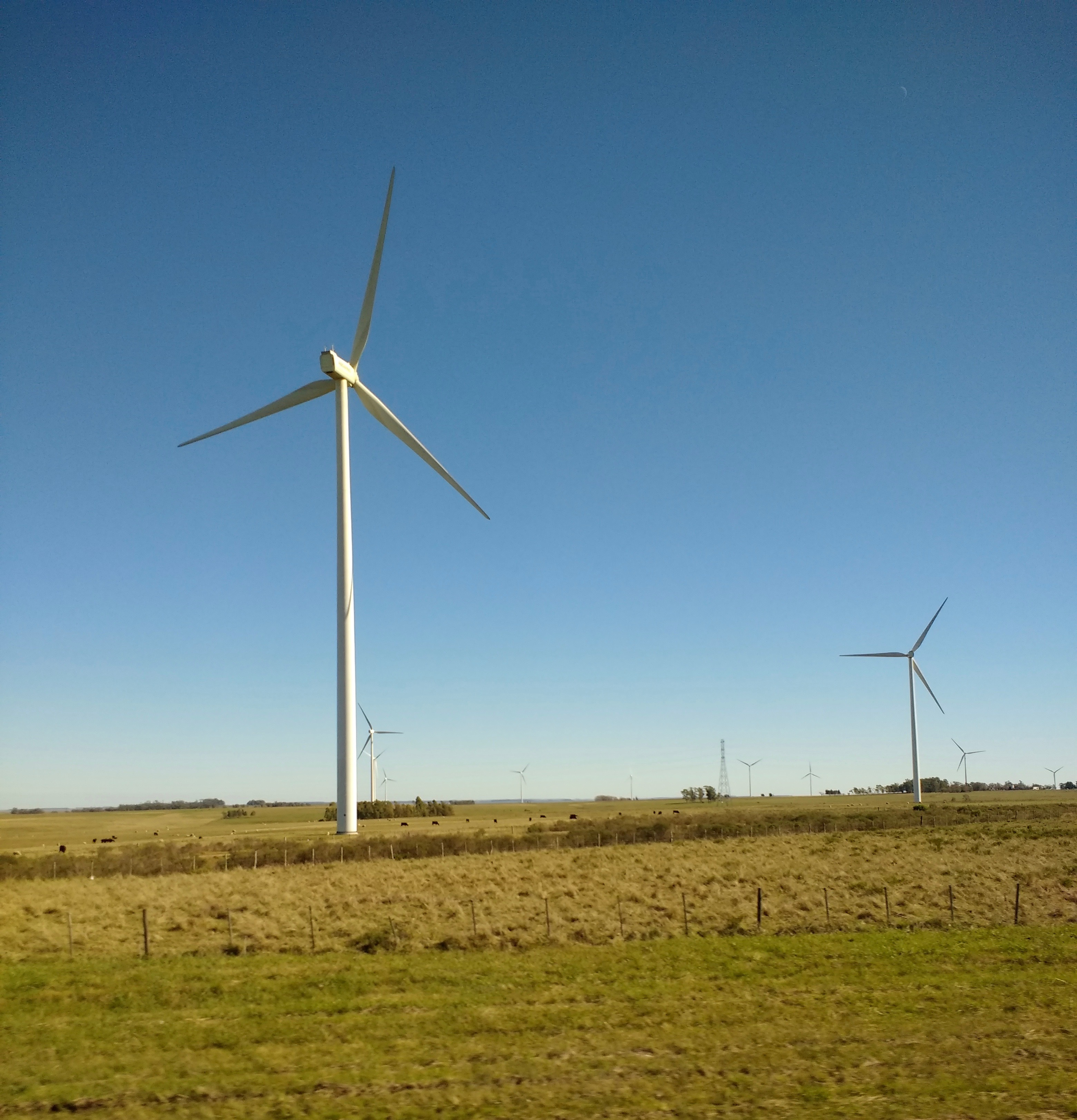
Wind turbines in Tacuarembó Department

Energy in Uruguay describes energy and electricity production, consumption and import in Uruguay. As part of climate mitigation measures and an energy transformation, Uruguay has converted over 98% of its electrical grid to sustainable energy sources (primarily solar, wind, and hydro). Fossil fuels are primarily imported into Uruguay for transportation, industrial uses and applications like domestic cooking. Four hydroelectric dams provide much of the country's energy supply.

== Overview ==
Historically, energy has been a stronghold of state-owned companies, such as UTE and ANCAP. The National Directorate of Energy (Spanish: Dirección Nacional de Energía) is the main governmental body in charge of energy policies.

The 2008 financial crisis made many of the materials to produce renewable energy cheaper, therefore Uruguay decided it would be the best time to develop their clean energy sector, heavily investing in 2011 and 2012. This has helped increase the country's output. These projects are all developed by the Uruguayan Energy Policies of 2005-2030.

Uruguay's renewable energies provide over 98% of the country’s electricity and 55% of the country's total energy mix.

This switch to renewables was possible because the political factions set aside their differences and agreed under President José “Pepe” Mujica in 2010 that this policy would remain consistent no matter who was in power.

The rest of Uruguay's electricity comes from natural gas, which is used when hydro power can't cover for diminished wind and solar output. According to an interview the former energy minister gave Forbes, the switch to renewables cut the country's energy cost in half, created 500,000 jobs and insulated consumers from price spikes.

== Electricity ==
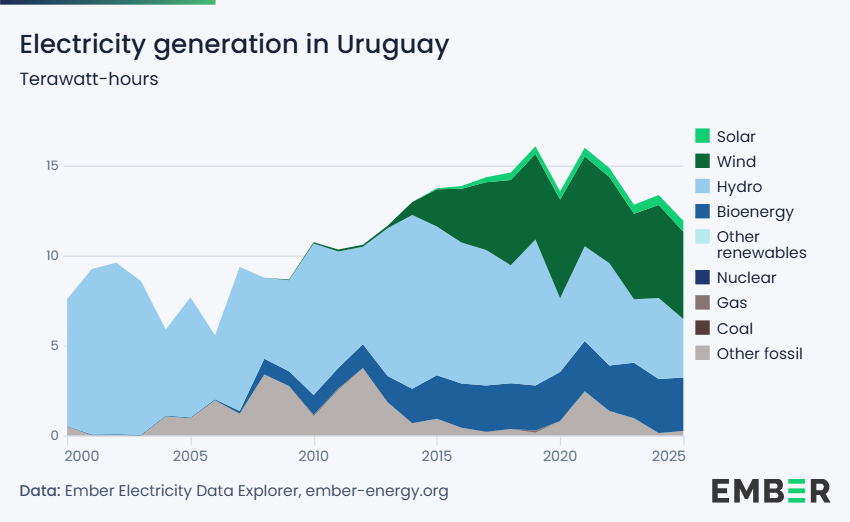

The electricity sector of Uruguay has traditionally been based on domestic hydropower along with thermal power plants, and reliant on imports from Argentina and Brazil at times of peak demand. Investments in renewable energy sources such as wind power and solar power over the preceding 10 years allowed the country to cover 98% of its electricity needs with renewable energy sources by 2025.

Hydropower provides a large percentage of installed production capacity in Uruguay, almost all of it produced by four hydroelectric facilities, three on the Rio Negro and one, the Salto Grande dam shared with Argentina, on the Uruguay River. The production from these hydropower sources is dependent on seasonal rainfall patterns, but under normal hydrological conditions, can supply off-peak domestic demand.

Thermal power from fossil fuel fired power plants, activated during peak demand, is used to provide the remaining installed production capacity. Generation from fossil fuel decreased substantially in recent years, with renewables accounting for 98% of electricity generation by 2025. Thermal power from biomass also provides additional power generation capacity.

A shift to renewable energy sources was achieved thanks to modernization efforts, based on legal and regulatory reforms in 1997, 2002, and 2006, which led to large new investments in electrical production capacity including from the private sector. Purchasing agreement offered by the government in the final reform in 2006 incentivized a rapid growth of sustainable energy capacity in the country. Wind power capacity has gone from negligible in 2012 to 10% of installed capacity by 2014. A new combined cycle power plant which can run on either gas or oil has been installed. A number of photovoltaic solar power plants have been built. Additionally, a new electrical grid interconnection has improved the ability to import or export electricity with Brazil.

=== Nuclear ===
The use of nuclear energy in Uruguay is prohibited by law 16.832 of 1997. Despite this, the country has several institutions that regulate its use, such as the Center for Nuclear Research (Centro de Investigaciones Nucleares) or the National Regulation Authority on Radiological Protection (Autoridad Reguladora Nacional en Radioprotección).

Furthermore, for several years Uruguay had a small nuclear reactor for research and personnel training. It was brought from the United States in 1964 and began to work in the building of the Center for Nuclear Research in Malvin Norte in 1978. It was turned off because of the detection of corrosion in 1985 and all nuclear fuel was removed. A year later, the Chernobyl and Goiânia nuclear accidents occurred. This influenced public opinion, and in 1988 —during the first presidency of Julio Maria Sanguinetti— a cooperation agreement of nuclear energy between Uruguay and Canada was signed, in which they planned the construction of a nuclear plant in the city of Paso de los Toros. The announcement caused a social unrest and it was decided to open a debate on nuclear energy. As a result, the Parliament did not ratify the agreement, and they passed the aforementioned law prohibiting nuclear energy in the country.

The energy crisis in Uruguay in 2007 led to Uruguay reopening the nuclear debate under the presidency of Tabaré Vázquez, when the Executive Branch established a multiparty committee devoted to the study of the use of nuclear energy to generate electricity and the installation of a nuclear power plant. The Fukushima accident stimulated the discussions of different scopes, especially political and social. In July 2011 the government announced that Uruguay was soon to enter Phase 1 of an evaluation of nuclear energy, (Note: Phase 1 consists on study on the basis of international workshops and statutes, of the different processes and needs. Only at the end of this technical stage is when the country can formally say whether made the decision to start the nuclear path. Phase 2 is the construction of the structure needed to solidify the control unit that is responsible for the safety aspect, building the legal and constitutional framework, begin forming human resources and appropriate technology study. This phase ends with the definition of the facility to be installed in the country and its technology. Phase 3 is the purchase of technology, and international negotiations to know what providers would perform with the waste generated by the industry, culminating in the construction of the plant. Phase 4 is the beginning of the operation itself of the plant.) providing 10 million Uruguayan pesos from the national budget to hire specialist advisers, consulting the population and reviewing the human resources and technology available.

== Fossil fuel use ==
Fossil fuels are largely imported into Uruguay for transportation and industrial uses. The high import costs, and the rapid transition to renewables on the electricity grid has increasingly made fossil fuels less important.

=== Petroleum ===
Uruguay is a petroleum importing country, and most of the industry is controlled by the state-owned company ANCAP. ANCAP operates both the only refinery in Uruguay, La Teja Refinery, and the distribution of gas within the country.

In 2025, the government authorised projects submitted by seismic exploration companies on Uruguay's offshore platform. Environmental NGOs oppose these projects and are taking legal action to prevent their implementation, considering them harmful to the environment.

== See also ==
- Electricity sector in Uruguay
- Petroleum in Uruguay
- Renewable energy in Uruguay
- Wind power in Uruguay
- List of power stations in Uruguay
