= Nuclear power in Uruguay =

The use of nuclear energy in Uruguay is prohibited by law 16.832 of 1997. Despite this, the country has several institutions that regulate its use, such as the Center for Nuclear Research (Centro de Investigaciones Nucleares) or the National Regulation Authority on Radiological Protection (Autoridad Reguladora Nacional en Radioprotección).

Furthermore, for several years Uruguay had a small nuclear reactor for research and personnel training. It was brought from the United States in 1964 and began to work in the building of the Center for Nuclear Research in Malvin Norte in 1978. It was turned off because of the detection of corrosion in 1985 and all nuclear fuel was removed. A year later, the Chernobyl and Goiânia nuclear accidents occurred. This influenced public opinion, and in 1988 —during the first presidency of Julio Maria Sanguinetti— a cooperation agreement of nuclear energy between Uruguay and Canada was signed, in which they planned the construction of a nuclear plant in the city of Paso de los Toros. The announcement caused a social unrest and it was decided to open a debate on nuclear energy. As a result, the Parliament did not ratify the agreement, and they passed the aforementioned law prohibiting nuclear energy in the country.

The energy crisis in Uruguay in 2007 led to Uruguay reopening the nuclear debate under the presidency of Tabaré Vázquez, when the Executive Branch established a multiparty committee devoted to the study of the use of nuclear energy to generate electricity and the installation of a nuclear power plant. The Fukushima accident stimulated the discussions of different scopes, especially political and social. In July 2011 the government announced that Uruguay was soon to enter Phase 1 of an evaluation of nuclear energy, (Note: Phase 1 consists on study on the basis of international workshops and statutes, of the different processes and needs. Only at the end of this technical stage is when the country can formally say whether made the decision to start the nuclear path. Phase 2 is the construction of the structure needed to solidify the control unit that is responsible for the safety aspect, building the legal and constitutional framework, begin forming human resources and appropriate technology study. This phase ends with the definition of the facility to be installed in the country and its technology. Phase 3 is the purchase of technology, and international negotiations to know what providers would perform with the waste generated by the industry, culminating in the construction of the plant. Phase 4 is the beginning of the operation itself of the plant.) providing 10 million Uruguayan pesos from the national budget to hire specialist advisers, consulting the population and reviewing the human resources and technology available.

== Institutions ==
=== National Regulation Authority on Radiological Protection ===
The National Regulation Authority on Radiological Protection depends on the Ministry of Industry, Energy and Mining. It was created by articles 173 and 174 of Law 17930 of December 19, 2005. It is the only one in Uruguay controlling emissions of ionizing radiations. It has technical and professional independence and is not linked to any institution related to nuclear energy except those that control the safety of who are exposed to emissions.

=== National Atomic Energy Commission ===
Since Law 15809 (article 342) created by the National Office of Nuclear Technology, the National Atomic Energy Commission (Comisión Nacional de Energía Atómica) came to be chaired by the director of the new executive unit, and became committed to advise the Executive on concerning national and international nuclear policy. In January 1996 the Commission was merged with the National Office of Nuclear Technology.

=== National Office of Nuclear Technology ===
The National Office of Nuclear Technology (Dirección Nacional de Tecnología Nuclear) was created by Law 15809 (art. 340) in 1986, with the mission to run the subprogram "Promotion of Nuclear Technology" onto the program 012 "Research for Application of Nuclear Energy", which is responsible for planning, coordinating and undertaking advocacy of nuclear technology, acting on the basis of general guidelines established by the National Nuclear Policy.

=== Centre of Nuclear Research ===
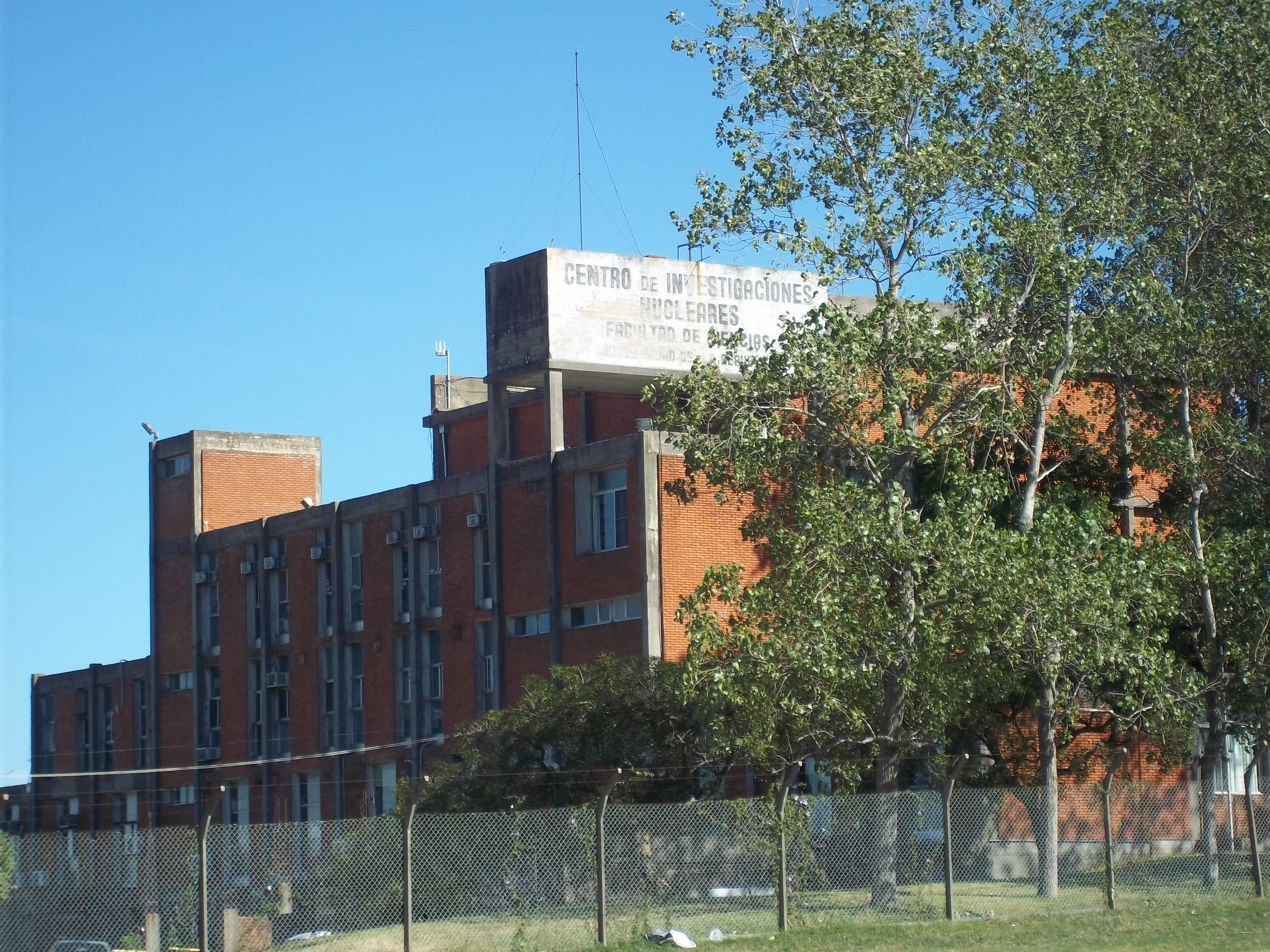
Centro de Investigaciones Nucleares building.

The Centre of Nuclear Research (Centro de Investigaciones Nucleares, abbreviated as CIN) was established in 1966 as a multidisciplinary research institute, within the framework of an agreement between the University of the Republic (Udelar) and the National Atomic Energy Commission. With the creation of Udelar's School of Sciences in 1990, the Central Directing Council of the university decided to incorporate the institute within the scope of this school. The CIN is the only infrastructure in the country ready, equipped and which has trained personnel to work and handle radioactive materials.

== History ==
=== Purchase and installation of a nuclear research reactor ===
In 1964 the United States government organized, in the US, a conference titled "Atoms for Peace", to which was brought a small low-powered reactor for research purposes. when it concluded, the Uruguayan government offered to buy it from the United States. Therefore, both governments —with the assistance of the International Atomic Energy Agency— signed a leasing agreement in 1965 under which the United States transferred 16049.57 grams of uranium to Uruguay —of which 3182.63 grams were of uranium-235— in order to be used as reactor fuel; and fissile materials consisting of five curie-plutonium-beryllium neutron sources with 79.98 grams of plutonium and two fission counters each containing 1.51 grams of isotope ^{235}U in 1.68 grams of uranium. In a second agreement, the United States transferred a research reactor to Uruguay, and promised to provide technical assistance with installation. In return, Uruguay agreed to pay for the reactor, the fees for the use of nuclear fuel and agreed to not transfer under any circumstances this fuel to third states outside the agreement.

The 100 KW reactor (Note: There is a discrepancy between information sources cited regarding the power of in KW in the research reactor. In the report of Savannah River National Laboratory (2005) and in the report of the Atomic Energy Commission (USAEC, 1970) was stated the reactor power of 10 KW, while in a contract signed between the United States and Uruguay in 1965, in the D. E. Puig's work «Centrales nucleares en la agenda: Uruguay al día» and in LaRed21's article entitled «Uruguay had a reactor» the power exposed is 100 KW.) was originally launched between 1959 and 1962 during the exhibition of the Atomic Energy Commission of the United States to South America, and was settled in Uruguay in the 1970s for educational, research and technical staff training purposes, placed in the building of the Center of Nuclear Research (Malvín Norte). Half of the building was intended for the reactor, manufactured by Lockheed Nuclear Products of Marietta (Georgia), purchased with a state investment of two million Uruguayan pesos of that time, including installation costs. Subsequently, Uruguay invested 20 million Uruguayan pesos from the government budget to construct the building and put it into operation. Law 13640, article 259 established that the reactor was the property of Uruguayan government and remained under the purview of the National Atomic Energy Commission.

This reactor was operational from the late 1970s to 1985, until it was shut down due to corrosion problems; fuel elements were removed from the core and put into dry storage, waiting to be transported to United States. The installation of this facility did not have any public opinion controversies.

=== Announcement of a nuclear plant ===
A year after the Goiânia accident and two years after the Chernobyl disaster, Uruguay began talks with Canada during the first presidency of Julio María Sanguinetti which advanced until the signing of a cooperation agreement on nuclear energy between the countries in 1988, a fact not known until the Earth Summit (1992). The agreement was almost ratified in Parliament in 1992, during presidency of Luis Alberto Lacalle. Also, a work group was created, which purpose was to evaluate the possibility of use this way to generate electricity in Uruguay.

Even though the installation of a nuclear power plant was not mentioned in the agreement, the second article of a report - signed by all political parties and elevated to consideration by the House of Representatives at the regular meeting on August 18, 1992 - established that the installation of nuclear power plants that could result from the implementation of article 215 of Law 16.226 based on the agreement, would require approval by law.

The 1992 announcement of the possible construction of a nuclear power plant with loans from the International Atomic Energy Agency in Paso de los Toros caused concern and generated various social movements, which was partially attributed to the proximity of the Chernobyl disaster. Were made mass meetings to inform people about this issue were held in the city of Rivera and the city of Tacuarembó, this latter attended by more than 400 people. Also, the Departmental Board of Artigas made a statement on the matter, and the Local Board of Paso de los Toros declared itself to be against the project. Even children of Paso de los Toros sent letters to senators and representatives of the Uruguayan parliament to vote against the installation of a nuclear power facility. About 6,000 people marched in protest occupying the entire road bridge over the Negro River, joined by people from Montevideo and from other places of the country. These social manifestations were held by the citizens themselves without the participation of political parties. These movements ended with the adoption in 1997 of Law 16.832, containing article 27, which bans the use of nuclear energy in the country.

=== Law 16.832 and dismantling of the reactor ===
Starting from entry into force of the law, the CIN reactor was deactivated, dismantled and returned to United States. After that, 1.2 million Uruguayan pesos from national budget of 2001 were assigned for the disassembly of the facilities which housed the reactor and for the management and disposal of radioactive waste generated by past use of the device. Since then, the CIN facilities designed to host it remain empty.

In 2004, Senator Sergio Abreu Bonilla submitted a bill to repeal this law in order to allow an investigation into the feasibility of using nuclear power, but this was unsuccessful.

There was no further mention of the nuclear issue at a national level until 2007, when the Executive branch under presidency of Tabaré Vázquez created a multiparty commission (called the Tribunal Ciudadano) devoted to the study of the use of nuclear energy to generate electricity, following standards recommended by the International Atomic Energy Agency. This reopened the national debate on nuclear power and convenience of installing a nuclear plant due to the country's energy crisis.

=== New debates ===
When the issue was reopened, opinions were heard from experts, politicians, media and the military. According to Diva Puig, a consultant in nuclear energy for Latin America of the IAEA, “the discussion about nuclear energy (...) must not exclude any sectors of society”. Justo Laiz, director of CIN, agreed with her, opining that “I do not agree that this issue be discussed only on a political point of view” because “energy issues should be part of scientific discussions and decisions”.

About the possibility of installing a nuclear power plant, Puig said: "Since Uruguay is in the world, I do not see another alternative to produce energy on a large scale". Meanwhile, Laiz said: "A nuclear power plant has many advantages, has zero pollution, but also has a risk, and before taking the decision it should be studied if a country has conditions to provide a system with maximum security. Regarding nuclear energy, no possible risk can be discarded ".

Hinia Balter, director of Centro de Energía Nuclear of Udelar's Sciences School, said that “a reactor would be cover the demand, and perhaps energy could even be sold to neighboring countries (...) A nuclear power plant is by far less polluting than thermal” and radioactive waste produced can be “contained, shielded and securely stored, following certain protocols”.

The process of installing the plant and train personnel could take from 10 to 15 years, and in 2008 had a cost estimated at around 3,500 million Euros. It would require training in diverse fields such as physics and nuclear engineering, lawyers in the field, and a nuclear research reactor for training, like the one used in the 1970s. One of the problem is the total lack of professionals in the area currently available. IAEA helps countries by providing expertise and training if a state decides to create a nuclear power plant with all guarantees.

In 2010, none of the Tribunal Ciudadano's members were in favor of the possibility of launching a nuclear-electric plan from 2030; however, they said that they would accept it if technological advancements minimized the risk associated, or if future studies provided information not currently available. Moreover, in a less populated country such as Uruguay, the aforementioned costs are not profitable at all due to the scale of the local economy. In addition, the growing investment in renewable energies and exploration of the presence of oil in Uruguay have pushed the nuclear debate to the background. According to Ramón Mendez:

Well, it seems pretty clear. For two reasons; firstly, when debate started in 2007-2008, none of this existed. And there was not a policy to 20 years agreed upon by the political parties. We did not know we could be so successful in the production of renewable energy at such competitive prices. So the picture changed. Secondly, Fukushima happened. And there are two important things: first, of the fifty-odd countries in the world who were analyzing the nuclear option, there were only two or three left, and they have not decided. [Some] Countries that were nuclear, are now retiring nuclear energy, such as Germany and many others. But another consequence was, from the investors' perspective, nuclear energy stopped being attractive. It is a high risk, because even though Fukushima has not caused death, that's true, four reactors were worth $20,000 million was rendered useless.

— Ramón Méndez, director of Dirección Nacional de Energía y Tecnología Nuclear

== Legislation ==
As early as 1937, there was legislation on the matter in regards to retirement benefits for people who, by nature of their work, must perform tasks that expose them to X-ray or other forms of radiation, or are required to manipulate those elements.

In 1997, Law 16832 – titled "Updating the National Electric System and the creation of the Energy Regulation Unit" – was approved, and in article 27 it established the prohibition of the use of nuclear energy in Uruguay, as follows:

The use of nuclear energy is banned in the country. No agent of the wholesale electricity market may enter into contracts for the supply of electricity with nuclear generators or foreign generators whose plants pollute the country.

Law 19056 about "Radiation Protection and Safety of Persons, Properties and Environment" was also enacted. It intended to establish general parameters for prevention and procedures to "ensure the radiation protection and safety regarding protection of occupationally exposed personnel, to the general public, properties, and the environment, from the adverse effects of radiations, avoiding or minimizing risks and radiation-induced damages, also ensuring the physical protection of the sources and buildings".

In the context of the obligations assumed by the country internationally, Uruguay signed or ratified the following treaties about nuclear energy and related issues:

- Treaty of Tlatelolco for the Prohibition of Nuclear Weapons in Latin America and the Caribbean, signed on February 14, 1967 in México D.F., and ratified by Law 13669 of July 1, 1968.
- Treaty on the Non-Proliferation of Nuclear Weapons of 1968, ratified by Law 13859 of June 4, 1970.
- Convention on Early Notification of a Nuclear Accident and Convention on Assistance in the Case of a Nuclear Accident or Radiological Emergency, both enacted by General Conference of the International Atomic Energy Agency on September 29, 1986, and ratified by Law 16075 of October 11, 1989.
- Vienna Convention on Civil Liability for Nuclear Damage of 1963 and an Optional Protocol to Compulsory Settlement of Disputes of this treaty, agreeing by Law 17051 of December 14, 1998.
- Comprehensive Nuclear-Test-Ban Treaty of New York, adopted on September 24, 1996, and ratified by Law 17348 of June 13, 2001.
- Convention on Nuclear Safety adopted in Vienna on September 20, 1994, and ratified by Law 17588 of November 29, 2002.
- Convention on the Physical Protection of Nuclear Material of October 26, 1979, ratified by Law 17680 of August 1, 2003.
- Joint Convention on the Safety of Spent Fuel Management and on the Safety of Radioactive Waste Management of Vienna on September 5, 1997, aprobed by Law 17910 of October 17, 2005.

== Near nuclear power plants abroad ==
Due to its proximity, the government of Uruguay is closely monitoring Atucha I Nuclear Power Plant, located only 70 kilometers from Colonia del Sacramento and 295 km from Montevideo, which began operating in 1974.

== Opinion polls ==
Between October 2010 and March 2011, polling company Factum performed a survey on a sample of the population to assess their agreement or disagreement about the installation of a nuclear power plant in Uruguayan territory and their feeling about these nuclear plants, the first one being in October 2010 (before Fukushima Daiichi nuclear disaster) and the next one being after, in March 2011.

From these, the following data were obtained:

Opinion about the installation of a nuclear plant
before Fukushima I incident	after Fukushima I incident
Data from Factum

== See also ==
- Energy in Uruguay
- Wind power in Uruguay
