= Wind power in Uruguay =

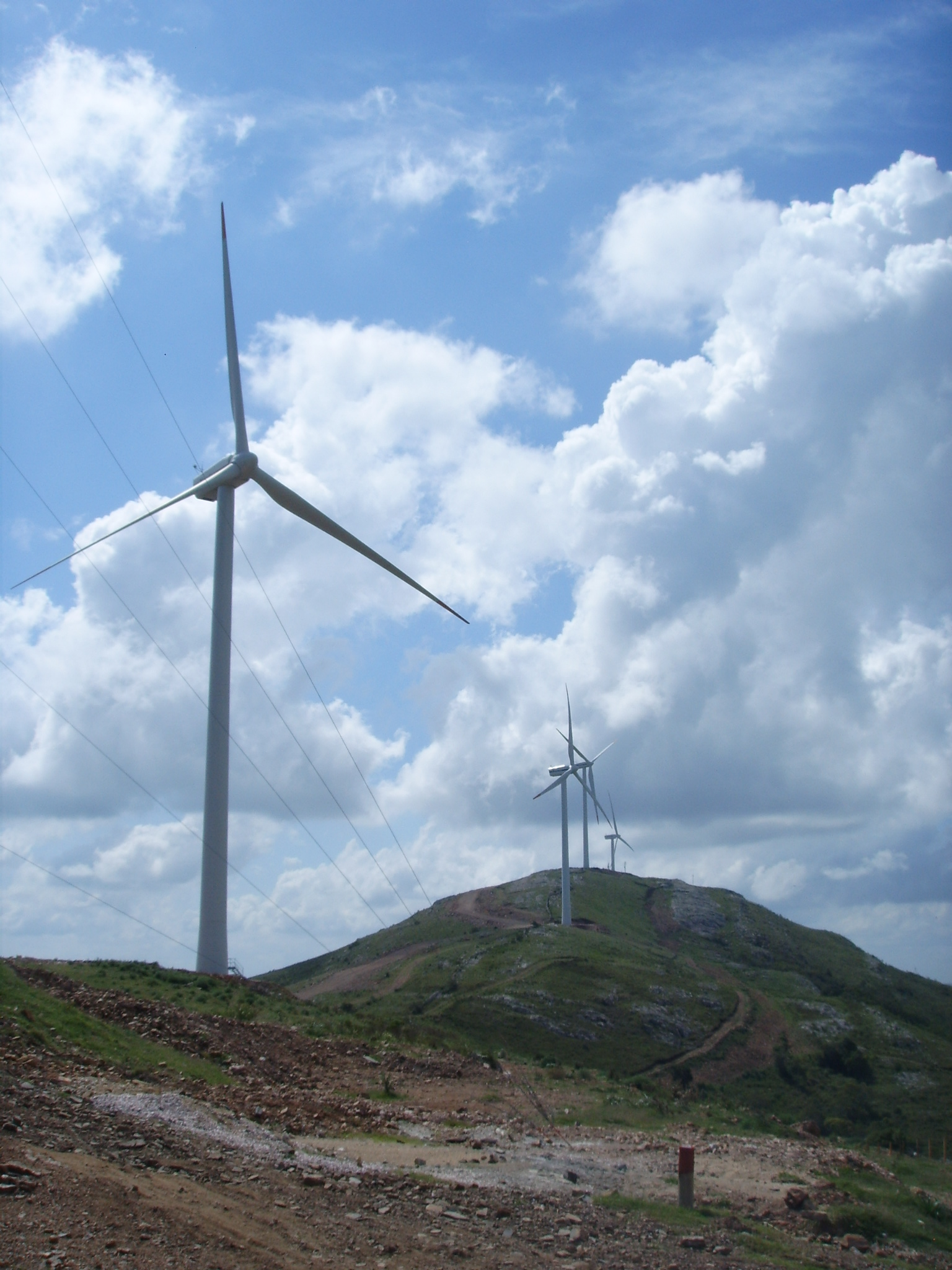
Sierra de los Caracoles wind farm.

Wind power in Uruguay generates a rapidly growing proportion of the country's electricity mix. In 2014, Uruguay installed the most wind power capacity per capita in the world. Overall, the majority of Uruguayan electricity generation is derived from hydroelectric sources.

In 2016, the country's total installed wind power capacity surpassed 1,000 MW. As of 2016, this figure comprised 17 percent of the country's overall electricity generation, marking a sudden increase in the overall share from the 2 percent of all alternative renewable energy sources made up in 2012. In July 2018 UTE, the country's power plants and transmission administrator, announced that record electricity demand was being met entirely by renewable sources, of which wind power comprised 34 percent. In 2023, Uruguay produced 98% of its energy through renewables.

The national government has supported this nascent of fast-moving wind power transformation by providing a policy environment of incentives like feed-in tariffs and utility-scale bidding. The former helped incentivize small-scale installations, while the latter enabled large-scale projects.

In the mid-2020's, Uruguay was being promoted as a global model for transitioning to renewable energy.

== Background ==
In 2008, the Uruguayan government set a target of 15% joint participation in the national electricity grid by a number of alternative renewable sources, namely biomass, wind power, and mini-hydro. Wind power alone far surpassed that proportion in the several years following the setting of that goal. Electricity generation auctions, first put forward in 2006, have been a primary vehicle for larger-scale deployment of mini-hydro and wind power deployment over the past decade.

Some analysts have credited Uruguay's ability to leverage UNDP funding to create reliable policy frameworks that would eventually encourage greater stand-alone private investment in the sector.

== Wind power in regional electricity trade ==
Its proximity to Argentina and Brazil make for relatively easy electricity trade between the countries, and in 2016 Uruguay began exporting excess wind power generation to neighboring Argentina. The two countries' state-operated utilities had previously sold electricity bilaterally, but the 2016 wind power sales marked the first Uruguayan-Argentine electricity trade between private companies. Meanwhile, along the Uruguayan border with Brazil, wind power projects are being approached through a binational partnership with Brazilian utility Eletrobras.

== Wind farms ==
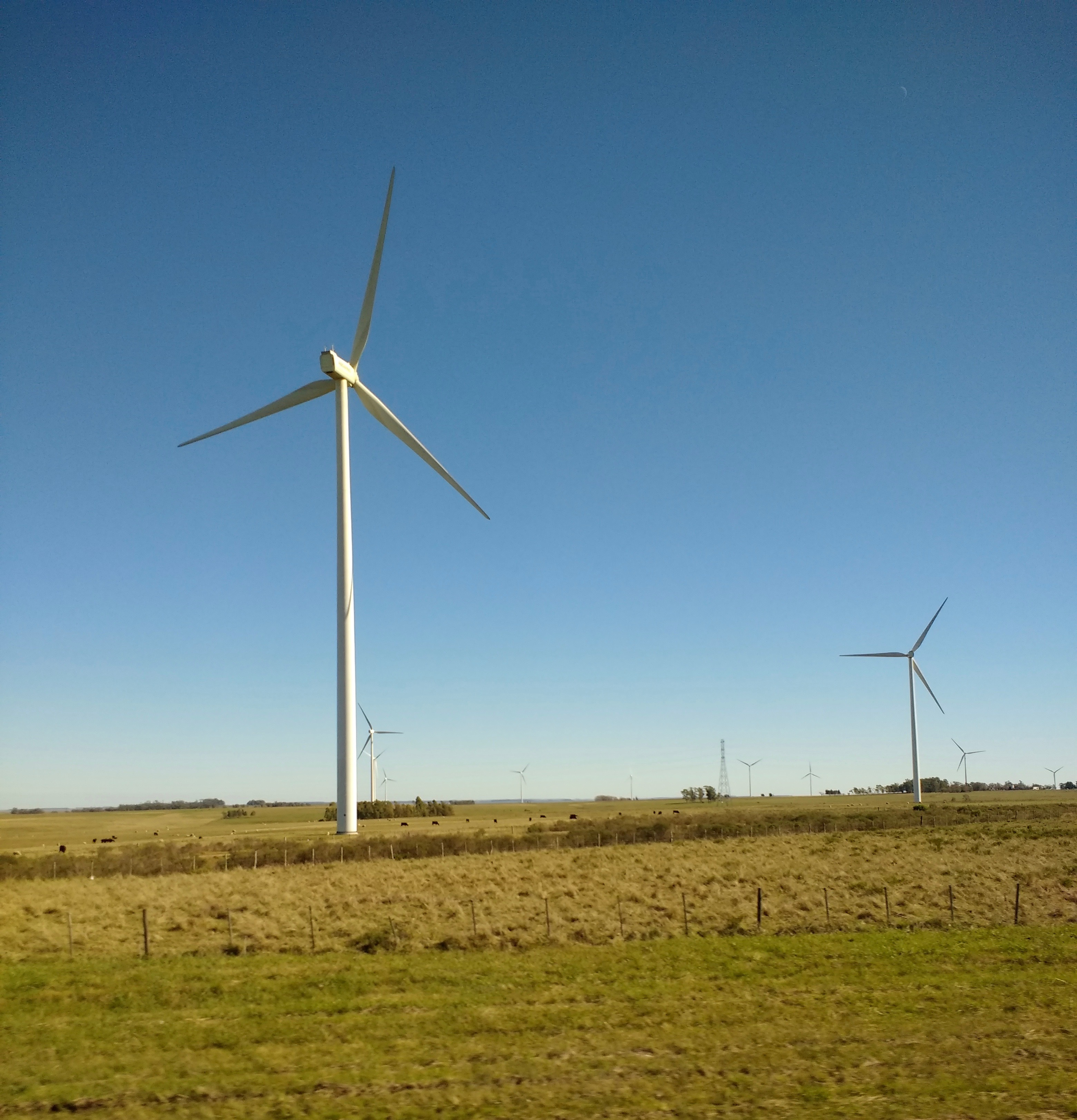
Wind turbines in Tacuarembó Department

As of 2026, there were about 50 wind farms in Uruguay, including:

- Peralta wind farm (Tacuarembó Department)
- Sierra de los Caracoles (Maldonado Department)
- Libertad (San José Department)
- Valentines (Treinta y Tres Department)

== See also ==
- Energy in Uruguay
- Electricity sector in Uruguay
- Renewable energy in Uruguay
- Wind power by country
