= Electricity sector in Uruguay =

Electricity sector of Uruguay
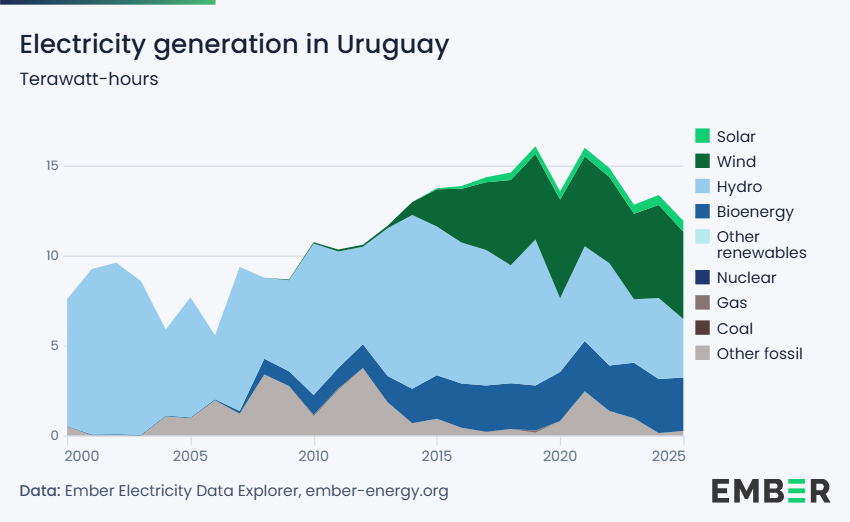
- Electricity generation in Uruguay in terawatt-hours

Data
- Electricity coverage (2019): 99.85% (total), (LAC total average in 2007: 92%)
- Installed capacity (2020): 4.6 GW
- Share of fossil energy: 2%
- Share of renewable energy: 98% (including large hydropower)
- GHG emissions from electricity generation (2006): 1.55 Mt of CO_{2}
- Average electricity use (2018): 3,275 kW·h per capita
- Distribution losses (2007): 18%; (LAC average in 2005: 13.6%)

Consumption by sector (% of total)
- Residential: 41%
- Industrial: 24%
- Commercial and public sector: 35%

Tariffs and financing
- Average residential tariff (US$/kW·h, 2026): 0.277
- Average industrial tariff (US$/kW·h, 2026): medium consumers: 0.147

Services
- Sector unbundling: No
- Share of private sector in generation: 6%
- Share of private sector in transmission: 0%
- Share of private sector in distribution: 0%
- Competitive supply to large users: No
- Competitive supply to residential users: No

Institutions
- No. of service providers: 1 (UTE)
- Responsibility for transmission: UTE
- Responsibility for regulation: Unidad Reguladora de Servicios de Energia y Agua (URSEA)
- Responsibility for policy-setting: National Directorate of Energy and Nuclear Technology (DNTEN)
- Responsibility for the environment: National Directorate of Environment (DINAMA)
- Electricity sector law: Yes (1997)
- Renewable energy law: No
- CDM transactions related to the electricity sector: 3 registered CDM projects; 251,213 t CO_{2}e annual emissions reductions

The electricity sector of Uruguay has traditionally been based on domestic hydropower along with thermal power plants, and reliant on imports from Argentina and Brazil at times of peak demand. Investments in renewable energy sources such as wind power and solar power over the preceding 10 years allowed the country to cover 98% of its electricity needs with renewable energy sources by 2025.

Hydropower provides a large percentage of installed production capacity in Uruguay, almost all of it produced by four hydroelectric facilities, three on the Rio Negro and one, the Salto Grande dam shared with Argentina, on the Uruguay River. The production from these hydropower sources is dependent on seasonal rainfall patterns, but under normal hydrological conditions, can supply off-peak domestic demand.

Thermal power from fossil fuel fired power plants, activated during peak demand, is used to provide the remaining installed production capacity. Generation from fossil fuel decreased substantially in recent years, with renewables accounting for 98% of electricity generation by 2025. Thermal power from biomass also provides additional power generation capacity.

A shift to renewable energy sources was achieved thanks to modernization efforts, based on legal and regulatory reforms in 1997, 2002, and 2006, which led to large new investments in electrical production capacity including from the private sector. Purchasing agreement offered by the government in the final reform in 2006 incentivized a rapid growth of sustainable energy capacity in the country. Wind power capacity has gone from negligible in 2012 to 10% of installed capacity by 2014. A new combined cycle power plant which can run on either gas or oil has been installed. A number of photovoltaic solar power plants have been built. Additionally, a new electrical grid interconnection has improved the ability to import or export electricity with Brazil.

== Electricity supply and demand ==
=== Installed capacity ===
Installed electricity capacity in Uruguay grew significantly from around 2,500 MW in 2009 to 5,267 MW in 2024. Of the installed capacity, about 29% is hydropower, accounting for 1,538 MW which includes half of the capacity of the Argentina-Uruguay bi-national Salto Grande, a similar share corresponds to wind farms while the rest is composed mainly of biomass, photovoltaic solar and thermal.

The table below shows the installed capacity as of 2024:

Plant	Installed capacity (MW)	%
Hydroelectric
Rincón del Bonete	160	
Baygorria	108	
Constitución	333	
Salto Grande (Uruguaya half)	945	
Total	1,538	29%
Wind
Total	1,517	29%
Biomass
Total	371	14%
Solar
Total	301	6%
Combined cycle
Punta del Tigre B	540	
Total	540	
Gas turbine
Punta del Tigre A	200	
La Tablada	212	
Total	412	
Diesel engine
Batlle Powerplant	71	
Total	71	
Total installed capacity 5,267 MW

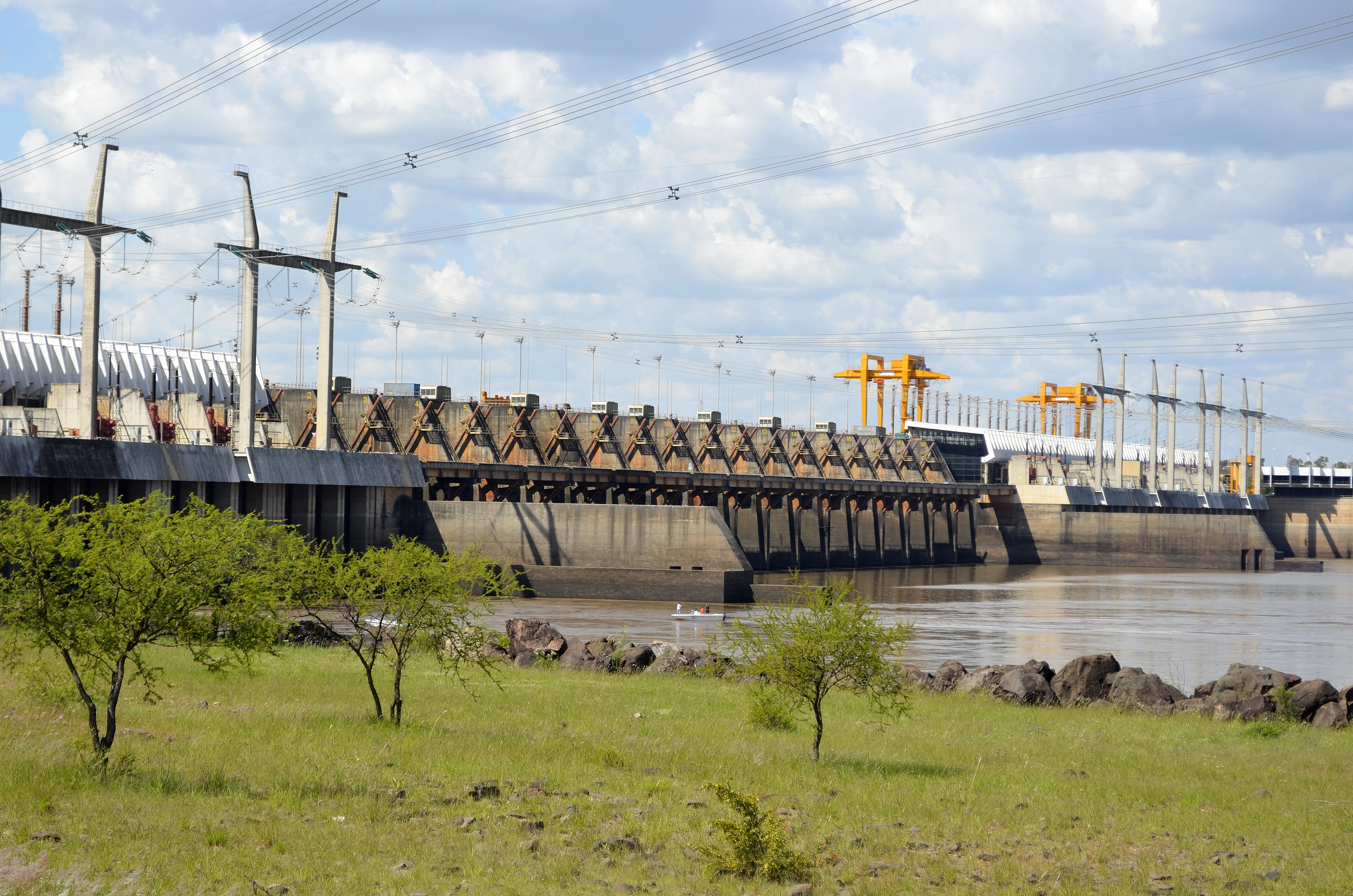
The Salto Grande Hydroelectric Plant with 1800 MW is the largest power station in Uruguay.

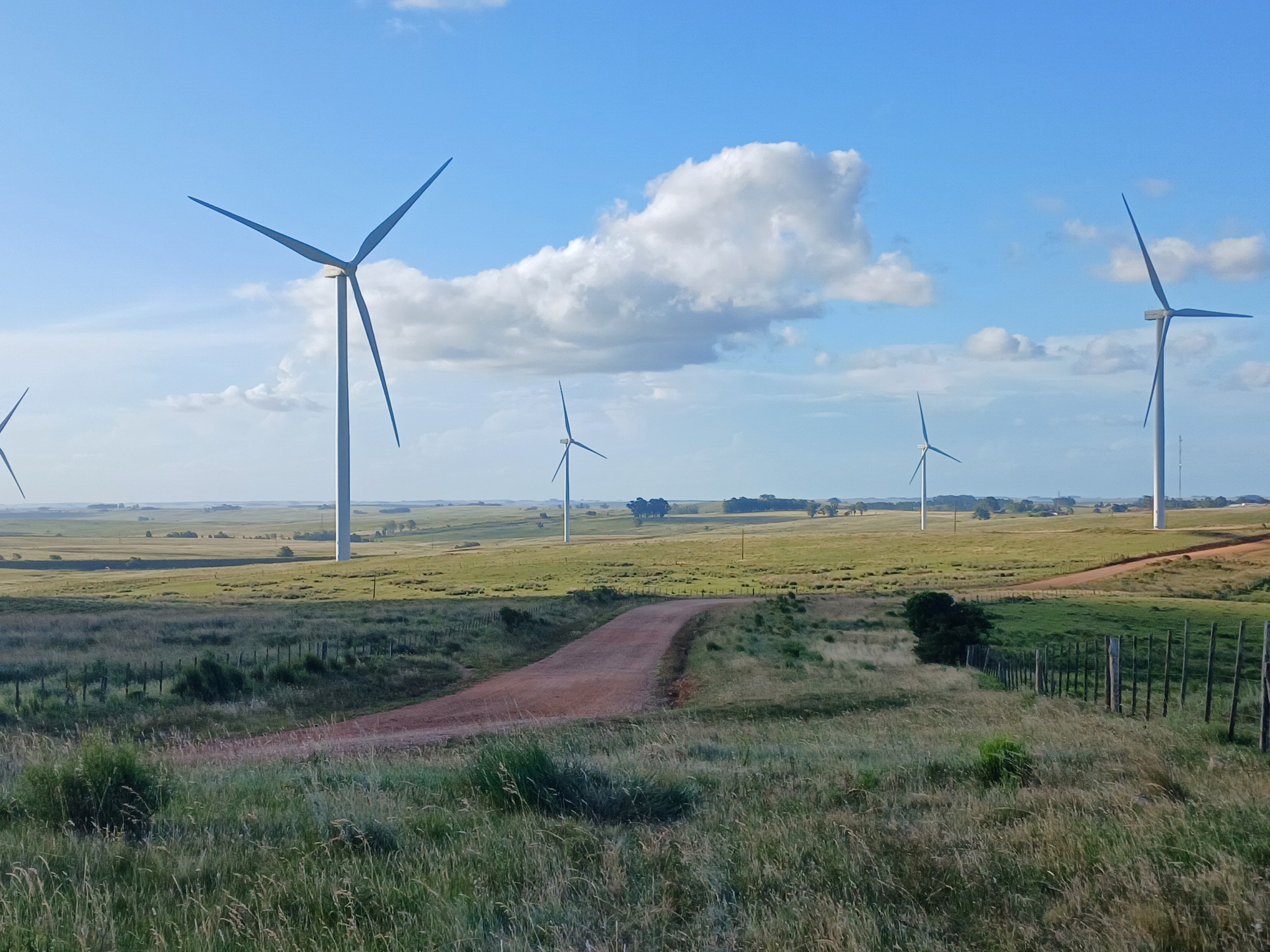
Wind farm in Valentines.

=== Imports and exports ===
In the years leading up to 2009, the Uruguayan electricity system faced difficulties to supply the increasing demand from its domestic market. In years of low rainfall, there used to be high dependency on imports from Brazil and Argentina and exports had historically been negligible. However, in the last decade the situation reversed and Uruguay became a net exporter of electricity to its neighbours. In 2024 Uruguay exported 2,026 GWh for 104 million dollars, the years 2019 and 2021 stand out with the highest exports of electricity since 1965 (3,012 GWh and 2,849 GWh, respectively).

In 2016 a 500 MW interconnection with Brazil was inaugurated. This expansion contributes to diversifying the supply sources in both countries and allows for greater exports.

Electricity imports
Year	Average power (MW)		
Year	Argentina	Brazil	Total
1999	707,640	61	707,701
2000	1,328,015	62	1,328,077
2001	116,815	5,877	122,692
2002	558,958	153	559,111
2003	433,913	315	434,228
2004	1,934,774	413,143	2,347,917
2005	834,863	750,346	1,585,209
2006	2,023,753	808,638	2,832,392
2007	573,629	214,960	788,589
2008	832,648	128,794	961,442
2009 (1)	737,613	433,249	1,170,861

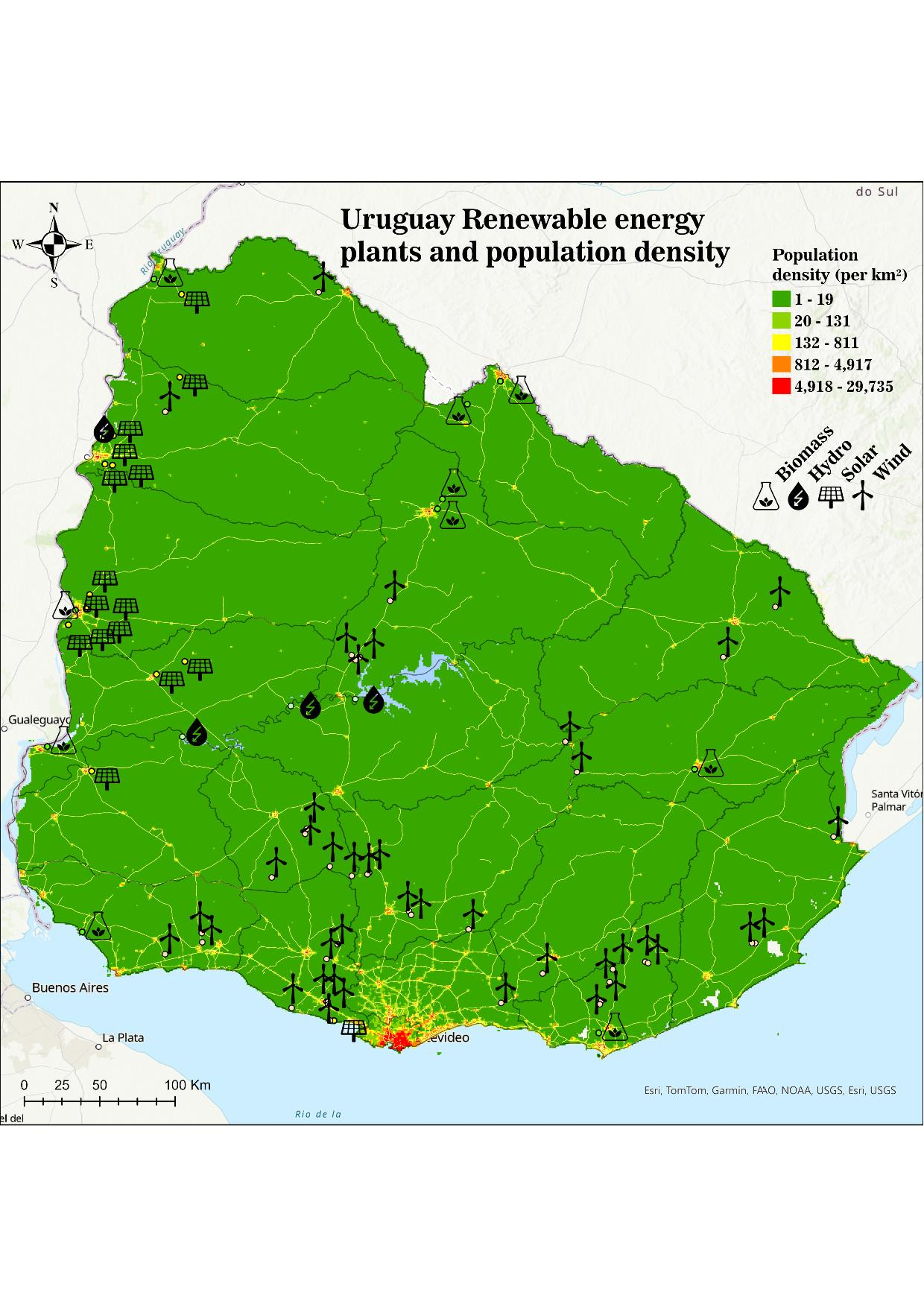
This map shows the distribution of renewable energy power plants (biomass, hydro, solar, wind) across Uruguay, overlaid with population density data.

(1) January–June 2009 These energy exchanges happen through two existing interconnections, a 500kv line with Argentina, through Salto Grande, and a 70kv line with Brazil, through Garabi.

=== Demand ===
Total electricity consumption in 2008 was 7,114 GWh, which corresponds to a per capita consumption of 2,729 kWh. Share of consumption by sector was as follows:

- Residential: 41%
- Industrial: 24%
- Commercial: 20%
- Public lighting and others: 15%

=== Demand and supply projections ===
In the period 2002–2007, after the 2002-2003 economic and financial crisis, electricity demand increased 4.9% per year on average. Electricity demand increased by 7.5% between 2006 and 2007, from 6,613 GWh to 7,112 GWh, reaching a per capita value of 2,143 kWh. Yearly demand increase is expected to be about 3.5% during the next ten years.

=== Reserve margin ===
Maximum demand on the order of 1,500 MW (historic peak demand, 1,668 MW happened in July 2009) is met with a generation system of about 2,200 MW capacity. This apparently wide installed reserve margin conceals a high vulnerability to hydrology.

== Service quality ==
Access to electricity in Uruguay is very high, above 98.7%. This coverage is above average for countries with public electricity services. Quality of service is perceived to be good both by companies and residential users. Companies suffer losses of just about 1.1% of their sales due to electricity service interruptions

Interruption frequency and duration are considerably below the averages for the LAC region. In 2004, the average number of interruptions per subscriber was 7.23, while duration of interruptions per subscriber was 9.8 hours. The weighted averages for LAC were 13 interruptions and 14 hours respectively.

UTE has implemented a series of measures to reduce electricity losses, which were particularly high during the 2002-2003 crisis. In December 2007, losses were still high, about 18%, of which 7% to 8% were of technical nature.

== Responsibilities in the electricity sector ==
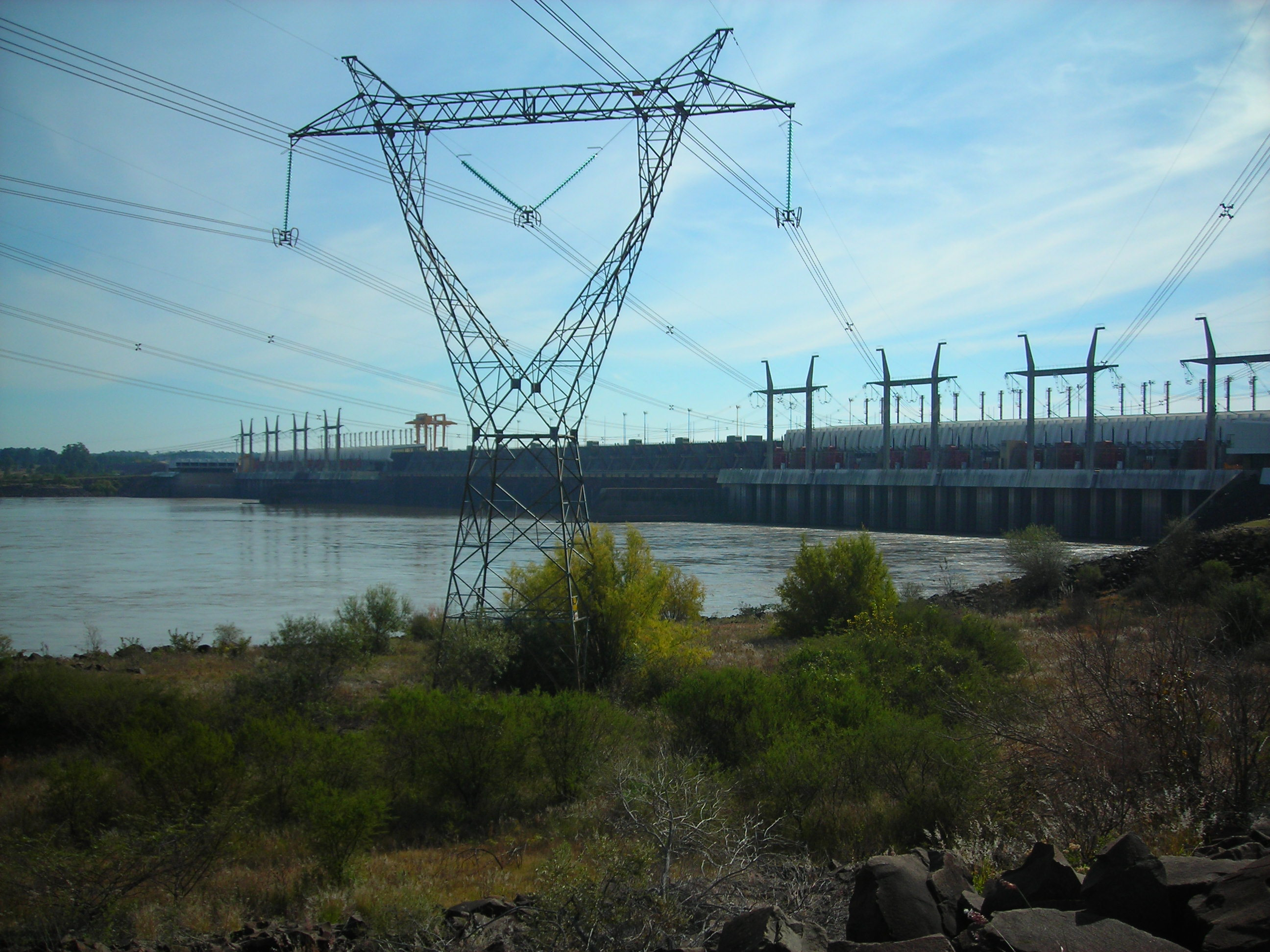
The Salto Grande Dam

The National Directorate of Energy and Nuclear Technology (DNTEN) formulates energy-sector policies. The regulatory functions are assigned to URSEA, the regulatory body. Both transmission and distribution activities are fully under the control of UTE, as established by the 1997 law.

== History ==
=== Early installations ===
The state-owned power company Usinas y Trasmisiones Eléctricas (UTE) formed in 1912. First efforts of rural electrification already started in the 1930s. In 1932, the José Batlle y Ordóñez power station located at the Montevideo port was inaugurated, replacing an older power station on the same site.

The first large hydroelectric power station was completed in 1945 in Rincón del Bonete. Before, power supply in Montevideo was done by a thermal power plant José Batlle y Ordóñez.

=== Power sector reform ===
In 1997, the national electricity law was updated following the principles of the so-called “standard model,” which contemplated the separation of regulatory/governance functions from corporate functions, and put in place the regulatory agency URSEA and a market administrator, ADME. The reform contemplated the remuneration of generators in order of merit, the creation of a wholesale market with regulated prices in transmission and distribution, where competition is not possible.

The reform has not been effectively implemented. After passing the modifications to the electricity law, secondary legislation was not forthcoming and the system continued to operate without any significant change. The new model was regulated in 2002 and it was expected that new operators would enter into a competitive market. The market did not develop as planned and demand actually decreased due to the economic crisis in the region. For instance, natural gas provision, which could have supplied new power generating units, did not materialize. Although URSEA and ADME were established, they cannot yet fulfil most of the functions established in their mandate.

=== Dependence on imports ===
For a full decade no power capacity was added to the power system. Prior to the completion of the 100 MW Punta del Tigre diesel power plant in August 2005, UTE had not added a power station to the system since 1995, when the last unit of Salto Grande came online. The absence of commissioning of new production facilities during this extended period was the product of a conscious, strategic decision to take advantage of market developments in Argentina and in the region, which would allow imports to fill any Uruguayan shortfalls, while exporting hydropower surplus production to Argentina and Brazil during wet years.

Dependence on imports from Argentina started to become problematic in 2004. Before 2004, UTE was able to supply its demand through a combination of contracts and purchases on the Argentinean spot market. As a result of the Argentine energy difficulties, UTE's contracts with Argentina for firm supply of 365 MW were reduced to 150 MW and were not extended beyond 2007. Notwithstanding this forced reduction in supply from Argentina over the low hydrology period of 2004–06, UTE was able to maintain energy imports through a noticeable increase of imports from Brazil and purchase of energy from the Argentine spot market. In 2008, supply costs increased substantially as the drought, high fuel costs and low availability of power in neighboring countries.

=== Policy options ===
The Energy Strategy Guidelines for Uruguay were defined in 2006 by the Ministry of Industry, Energy and Mines (MIEM). This strategy includes: (i) diversifying energy sources to reduce costs and emissions, as well as increase energy security; (ii) increasing private participation in new renewable power generation; (iii) increasing regional energy trade; and (iv) facilitating availability and acquisition of energy efficient goods and services, including efforts to raise public awareness regarding demand-side management interventions. According to the National Directorate for Energy and Nuclear Technology (DNETN), grid-connected wind power generation is one of the domestic resources with both medium and long term potential in Uruguay.

The government has taken action to promote RE development. In March 2006, the executive power issued Decree No.77/2006 to foster private generation through wind, biomass and small hydropower plants. A target of 60 MW was established for the first tender, which was conducted by UTE in August 2006. Although bids received for wind and biomass projects were all higher than US$70/MWh, this can be attributed to the small size of the proposed projects and the uncertainty of contractual arrangements.

Interconnecting with Brazil is also particularly attractive. The expansion of the interconnection capacity with Brazil may be carried out either along the Coast or from Salto Grande. This expansion would contribute to diversifying the supply sources and could be done in order to take advantage of the installation of large thermal (coal) plants in the South of Brazil.

== See also ==
- Energy in Uruguay
- Economy of Uruguay
- Politics of Uruguay
- List of power stations in Uruguay
- 2019 Argentina and Uruguay blackout

== Sources ==
- ESMAP 2007. Strengthening Energy Security in Uruguay.
