= Rodolfo Tálice =

Uruguayan scholar, physician and writer (1899-1999)

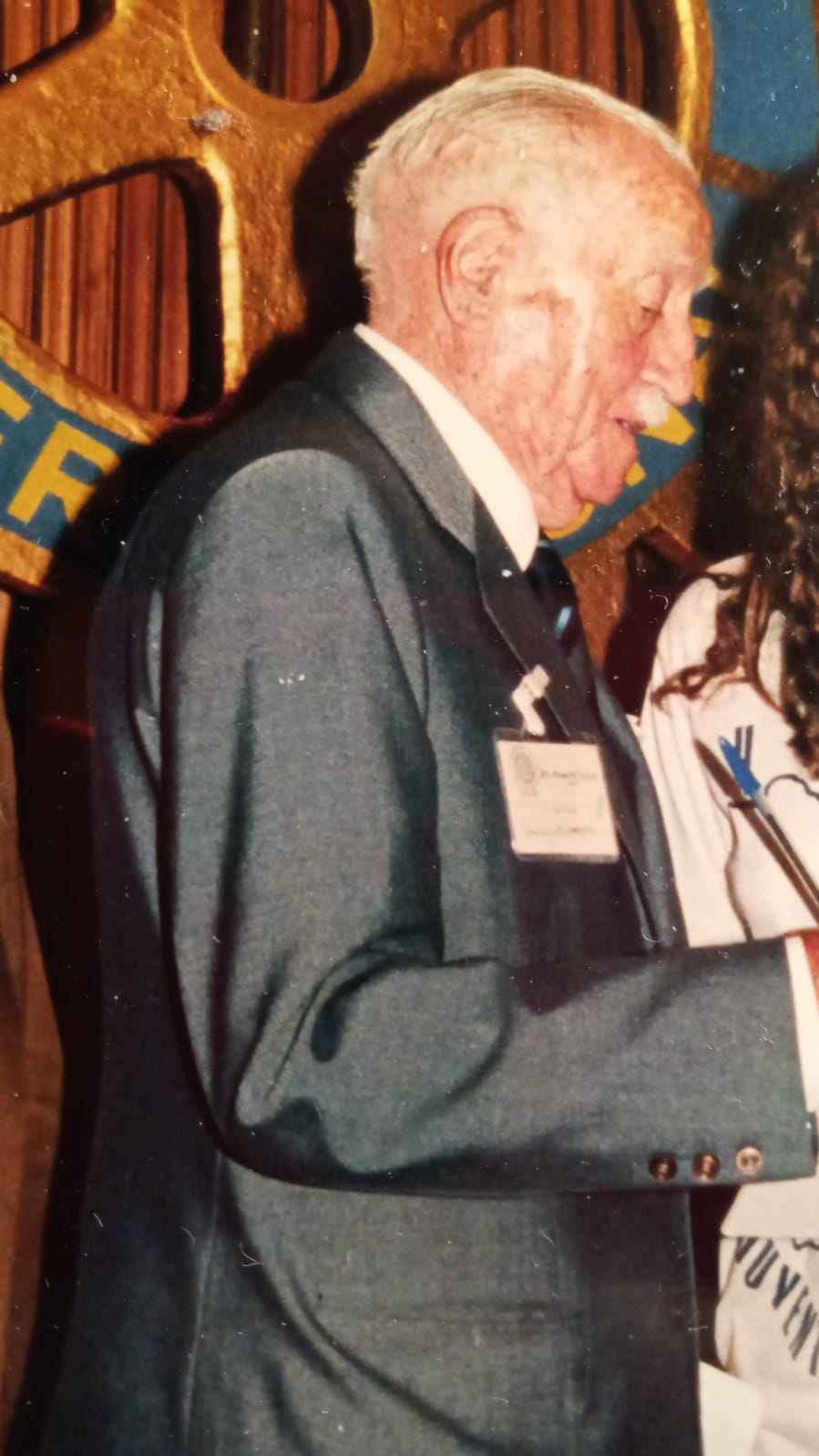
Talice in 1989.

Rodolfo Vicente Tálice Ruiz (2 May 1899, in Montevideo – 2 June 1999) was a Uruguayan scholar, physician and writer.

In the 1960s, he was dean of the School of Humanities and Sciences, University of the Republic.

An early advocate of environmentalism in his country, he was the presidential candidate of the Green Eto-Ecologist Party in the elections of 1989 and 1994.

== Books ==
- Mendel - Enciclopedia del Pensamiento Especial (1968)
- Mamíferos autóctonos - Nuestra Tierra (1969)
- Cuentos, confesiones y conferencias (1969)
- El Hombre, Agresión y Vinculación (1976)
- Vejentud: Humano Tesoro (1979)
- 10 x 10 comportamientos destacables en los animales y en el hombre (1982)
- Vocabulario científico universal algunas precisiones terminológicas (1988)
- Bichos del terruño - Colección Referencias (1992)
- Juventud - Humano tesoro el arte de vivir intensamente 100 años (1992)
- El Sorprendente Cuerpo Humano (1993)
- Enfermedades parasitarias del hombre y parásitos de interés médico etiología, epidemiología, patología, clínica, diagnóstico, tratamiento, profilaxis (1994)
- Condiciones Para un Mañana Digno. El Punto de Vista Etológico (1994)
- Comportamientos Destacables en los Animales y en el Hombre (-)
- Etoecología Práctica (-)
- Carta Abierta a Futuros Padres y Madres (-)

Shared authorship

- Estudio epidemiológico sobre la enfermedad de Chagas de la zona epidémica del Uruguay (1952)
- Investigaciones sobre los roedores autóctonos del género Ctenomys ("Tucu-Tucu") especialmente desde el punto de vista biológico (1954)
- Estudio monográfico sobre Ctenomys torquatus "Tucu-Tucu" especialmente desde el punto de vista biológico (1954)
- Nuevas investigaciones sobre el comportamiento natural y experimental del roedor autóctono Ctenomys torquatus ("Tucu-Tucu") (1955)
- Geografía de la Vida - Nuestra Tierra (1969)
- Manual Práctico de Hongos Comestibles (-)
- Hongos Comestibles de la América Meridional, cómo se recogen, cómo se reconocen, cómo se distinguen de los venenosos, cómo se preparan (1963)
