= Partido Verde Eto-Ecologista =

Uruguayan political party

The Green Eto-Ecologist Party (Spanish: Partido Verde Eto-Ecologista) was a Uruguayan green party.

Established in 1987, it obtained 11,000 votes in the 1989 Uruguayan general election, with Dr. Rodolfo Tálice as its presidential candidate and Homero Mieres as the party leader, with general secretary Fernando Estévez Griego. In 1994, it obtained 5,500 votes. In 2009, the party dissolved.
