= Radesca S.A. =

Uruguay electronic manufacturing company

Radesca S.A. (also known as JUAN J. RADESCA S.A.) is an electronics manufacturing company in Uruguay, in the neighborhood of Peñarol in Montevideo. The company is the only producer of lead-acid batteries in the country. The factory was founded in 1935 and has been operated as a family business since. As of 2013, they employed 43 people and were protected by the national government as part of maintenance of national industries, especially for national automotive parts. They gained significant prominence during the Import substitution industrialization policy period during the 1960s.

Their main manufacturing and smelting plant for lead in Montevideo is one of the main sources of lead contamination in the country. During the 1960s, the plant employed a number of processes for lead-acid battery recycling that exposed both employees and the local communities to large levels of industrial contamination. Workers would later describe active collusion between doctors, state agencies and the managers to hide the impact of lead on worker health.
