= UTE =

Uruguay's government-owned power company

Administración Nacional de Usinas y Trasmisiones Eléctricas

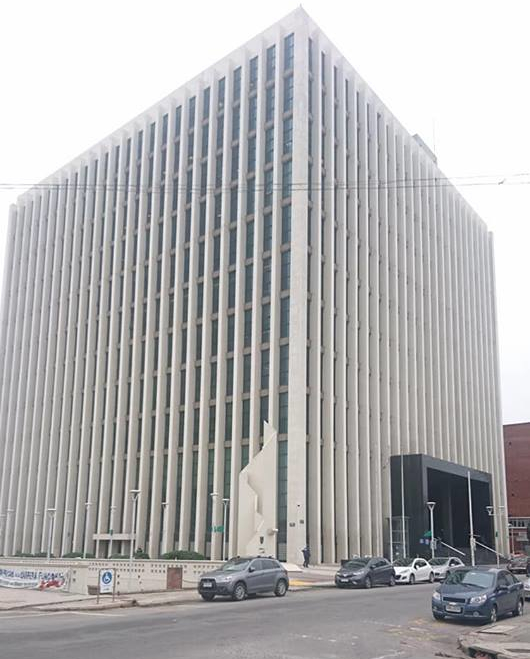
- UTE headquarters building
- Company type: State-owned enterprise
- Industry: Electric utility
- Founded: October 21, 1912
- Founder: José Batlle y Ordóñez
- Headquarters: Montevideo, Uruguay
- Area served: Uruguay
- Services: Electric power generation and transmission
- Net income: 4,194,223,450 Uruguayan peso (2023)
- Owner: Government of Uruguay
- Number of employees: 6.279 (2023)
- Website: UTE

The National Administration of Power Plants and Electrical Transmissions (Spanish: Administración Nacional de Usinas y Trasmisiones Eléctricas), better known as UTE, is Uruguay's government-owned power company. It was established in 1912, following approval of Law 4273 establishing it as a monopoly.

In 1931 the monopoly on communications was also granted to UTE, until the founding of ANTEL in 1974.

In 1980 an organic law was passed.

== See also ==
- Electricity sector in Uruguay
- Energy in Uruguay
