= List of power stations in Uruguay =

This article lists all power stations in Uruguay.

== Thermal ==
Station	Capacity (MW)	Year completed	Technology
Punta del Tigre	840	2019	Combined Cycle
La Tablada	212	1991	Gas turbine
José Batlle y Ordóñez	70	1931-1955-1975	Diesel engine

== Hydroelectric ==
Hydroelectric station	Capacity (MW)	Year completed	River
Salto Grande Dam	1,890	1979	Uruguay River
Constitución Dam	333	1982	Río Negro
Rincón del Bonete Dam	160	1948	Río Negro
Baygorria Dam	108	1960	Río Negro

== Solar ==
Solar plant	Capacity (MW)	Year completed
La Jacinta	64	January 15, 2016
Alto Cielo	26.4	April 11, 2016

== Wind (Aeolic) ==
Wind farm	Aerogenerators	Capacity (MW)	Year completed
Peralta I-II		117.5	2015 July
Juan Pablo Terra		67.2	2015 December
Artilleros		65.1	2015 February
Carapé I		52.3	2015 September
Cuchilla de Peralta		50	2014 May
Florida I		50	2014 November
Maldonado I		50	2014 April
Melowind		50	2015 September
Pintado I		50	2014 August
Pintado II		20	2014 November
Talas de Maciel I		50	2015 July
Talas de Maciel I		50	2015 February
Carapé I		43.1	2015 September
Minas I		42	2014 September
Loma Alta		18	2008 June
Pintado II		18	2014 August
Magadalena		17.2	2011 May
Caracoles I	5 x 2 MW	10	2008 December
Caracoles II	5 x 2 MW	10	2010 June
Ventus I		9	2015 October
Libertad		7.7	2014 July
