= Salto Grande Dam =

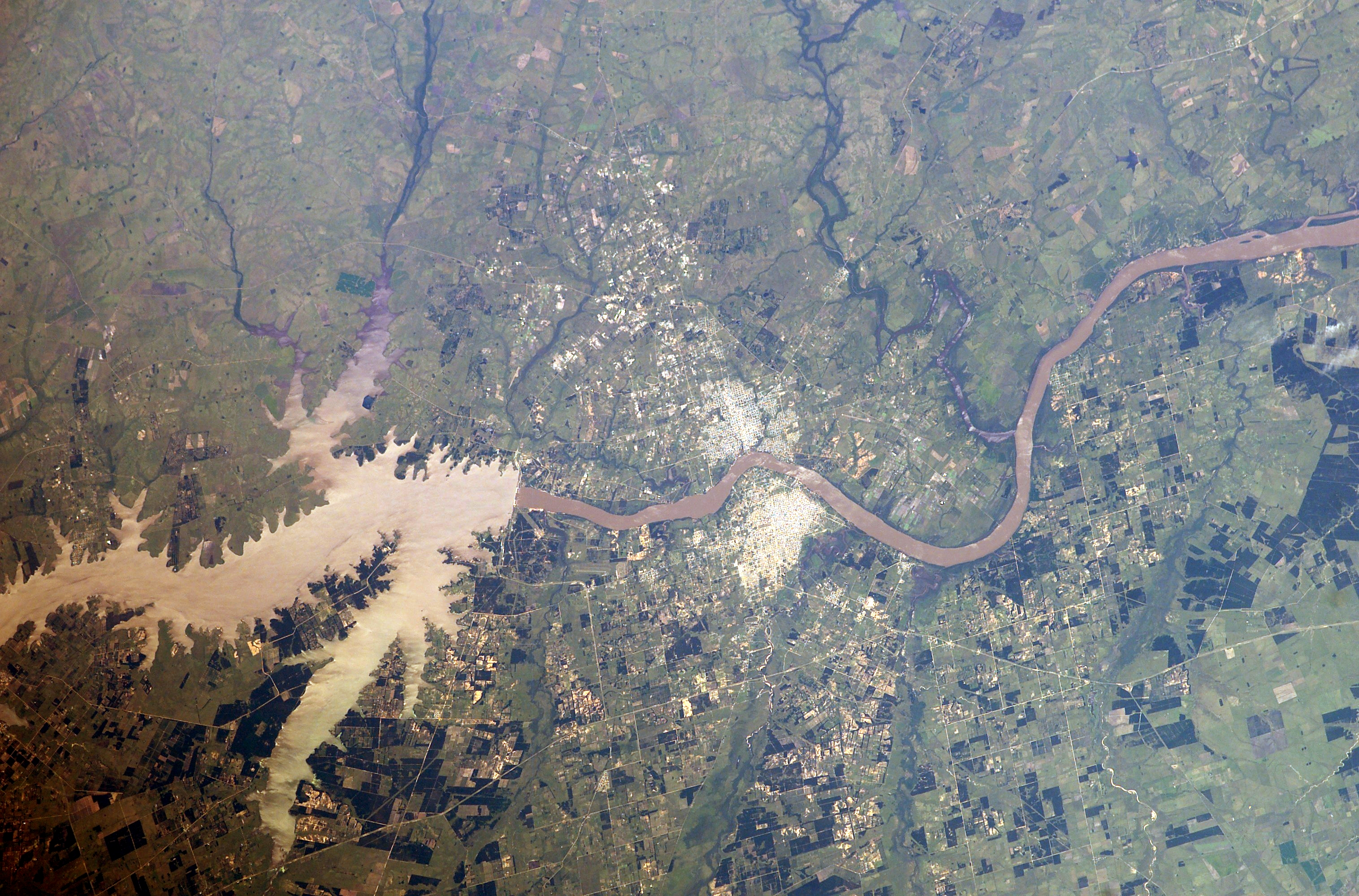
- The dam as seen from space
- Interactive map of Salto Grande Dam
- Location: Concordia; Salto
- Coordinates: 31°16′29″S 57°56′18″W
- Construction began: April 1, 1974
- Opening date: 1979

Dam and spillways
- Impounds: Uruguay River
- Height: 65 m (213 ft)
- Length: 3,000 m (9,800 ft)
- Spillway capacity: 64,000 m^{3}/s (2,300,000 cu ft/s)

Reservoir
- Creates: Salto Grande Reservoir
- Total capacity: 5 km^{3} (4,100,000 acre⋅ft)
- Catchment area: 224,000 km^{2} (86,000 sq mi)
- Surface area: 783 km^{2} (302 sq mi)

Power Station
- Turbines: 14 × 135 MW (181,000 hp)
- Installed capacity: 1,890 MW (2,530,000 hp)
- Annual generation: 7,812 GWh
- Website https://www.saltogrande.org/index.php

The Salto Grande Dam is a large hydroelectric dam on the Uruguay River, located between Concordia, Argentina, and Salto, Uruguay; thus shared between the two countries.

The construction of the dam began in 1974 and was completed in 1979. Power is generated by fourteen Kaplan turbines, totaling the installed capacity to 1,890 MW (2,530,000 hp). The dam passes approximately 64,000 cubic metres (2,300,000 cu ft) of water per second, compared to the current average flow of the Uruguay River at 4,622 cubic metres (163,200 cu ft). The reservoir has a total area of 783 square kilometres (302 sq mi), while its maximum dimensions are 140 by 9 kilometres (87.0 mi × 5.6 mi).

== Gallery ==
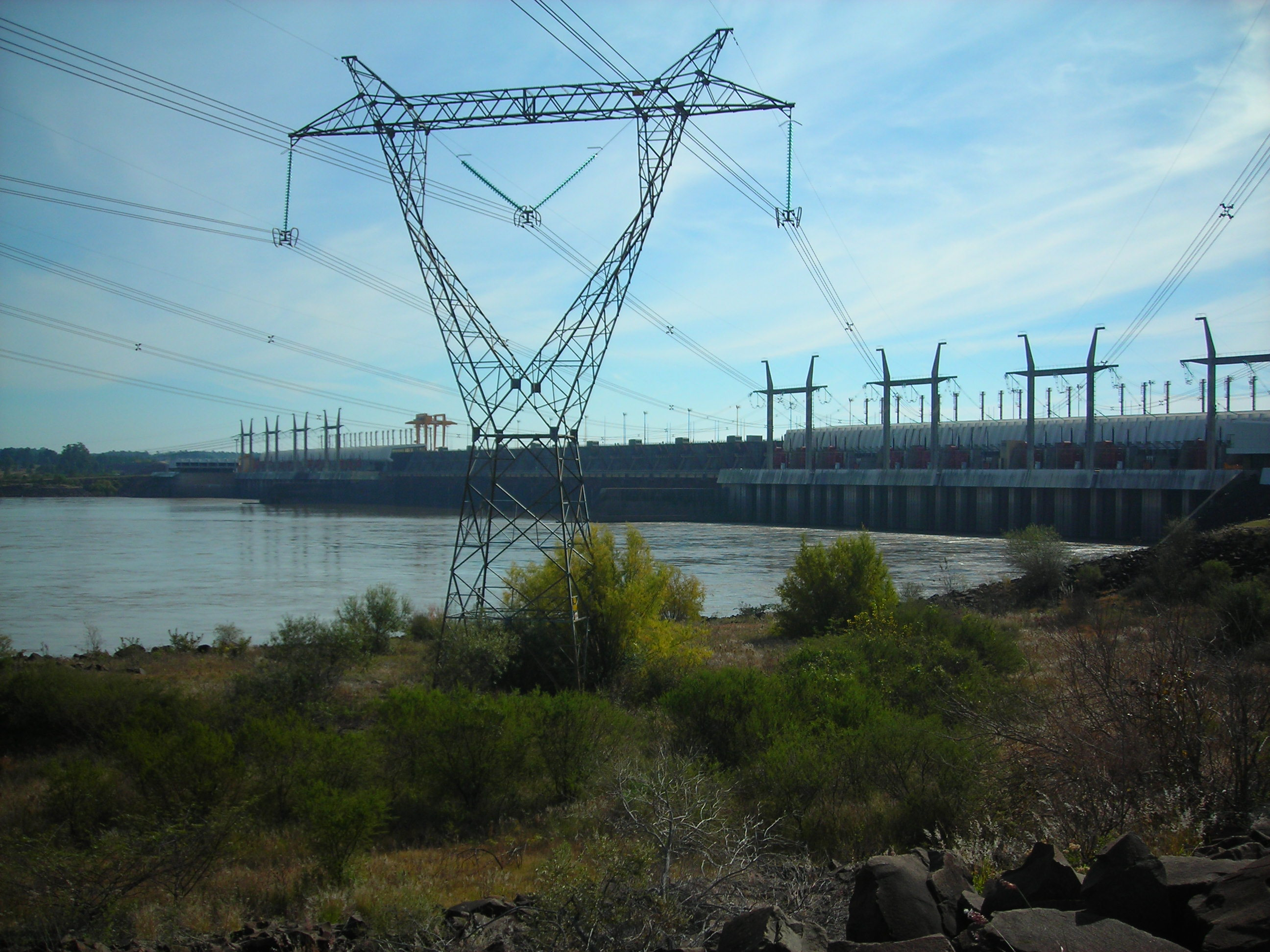
The Salto Grande dam

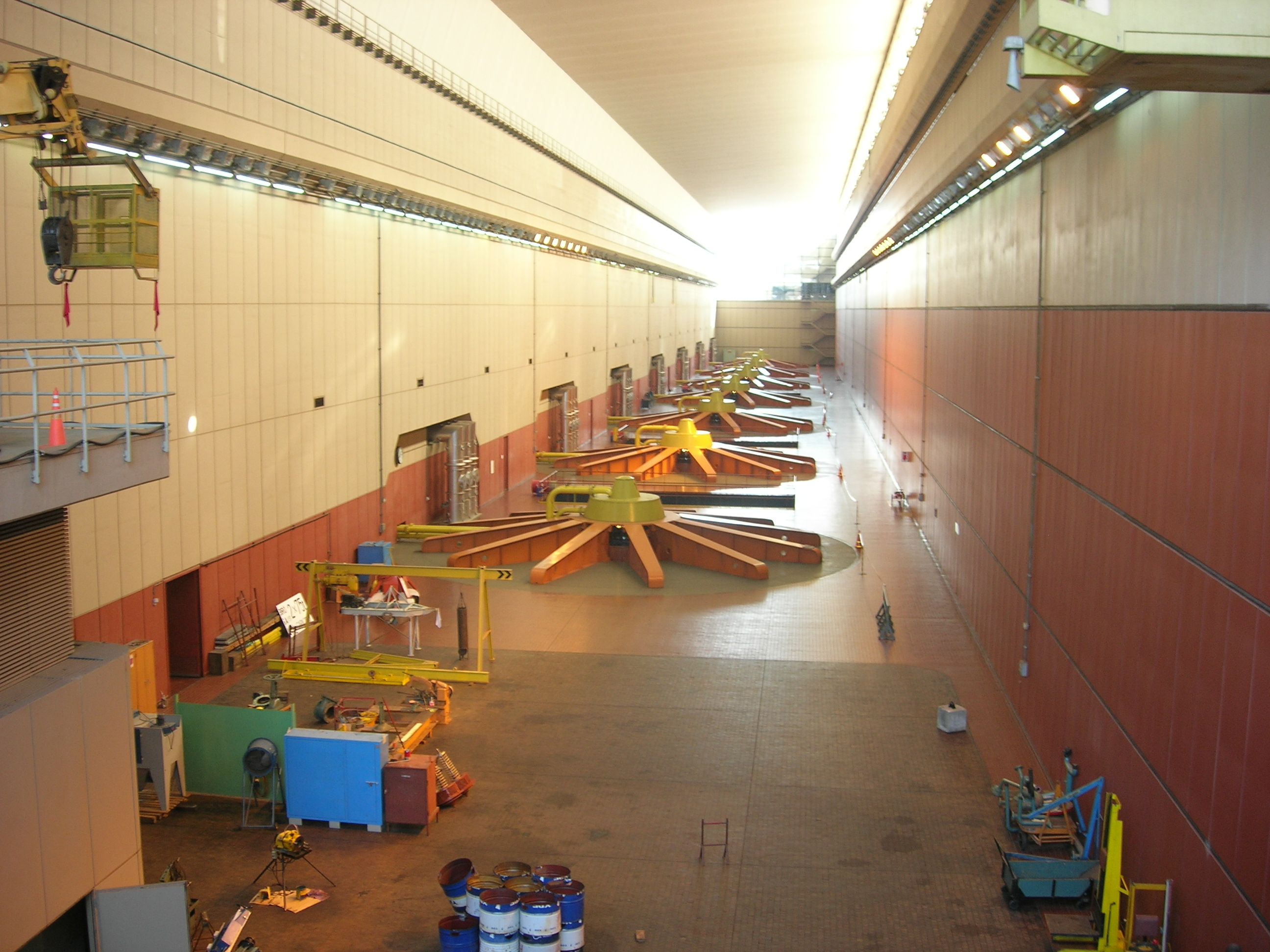
Inside the generator hall

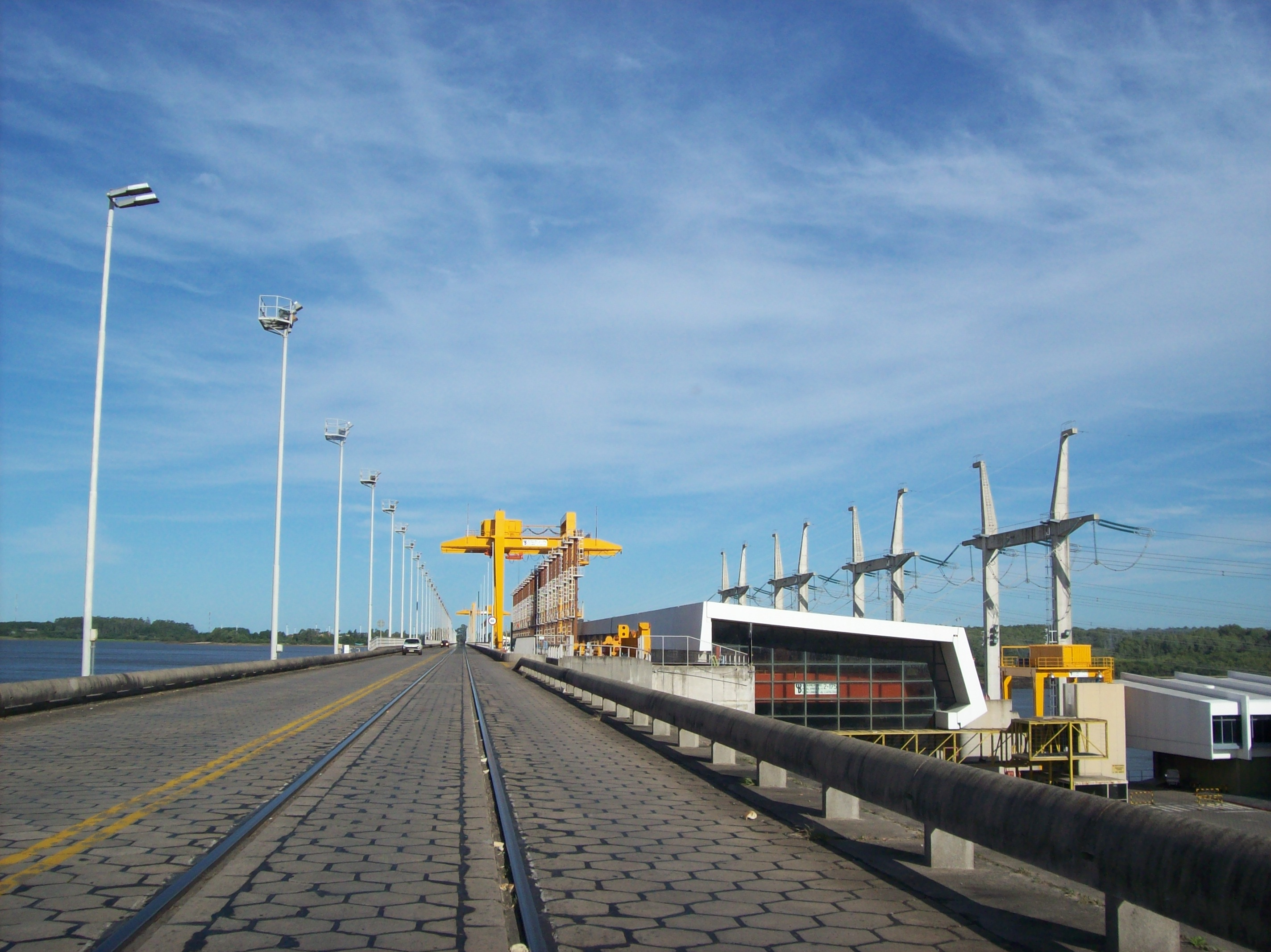
Salto Grande Bridge over the dam

== See also ==
- List of conventional hydroelectric power stations
- List of power stations in Argentina
- Salto Grande Waterfall
- Salto Grande Bridge
