= Argentina–Uruguay relations =

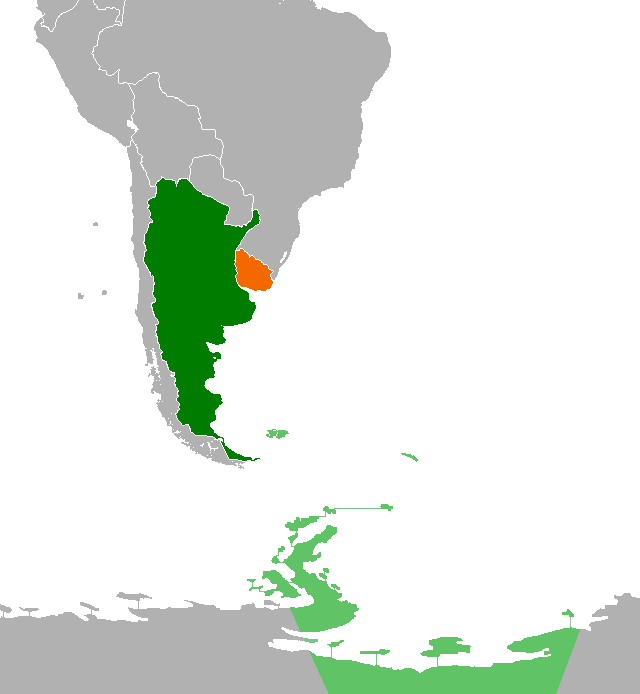
- Argentina: Uruguay

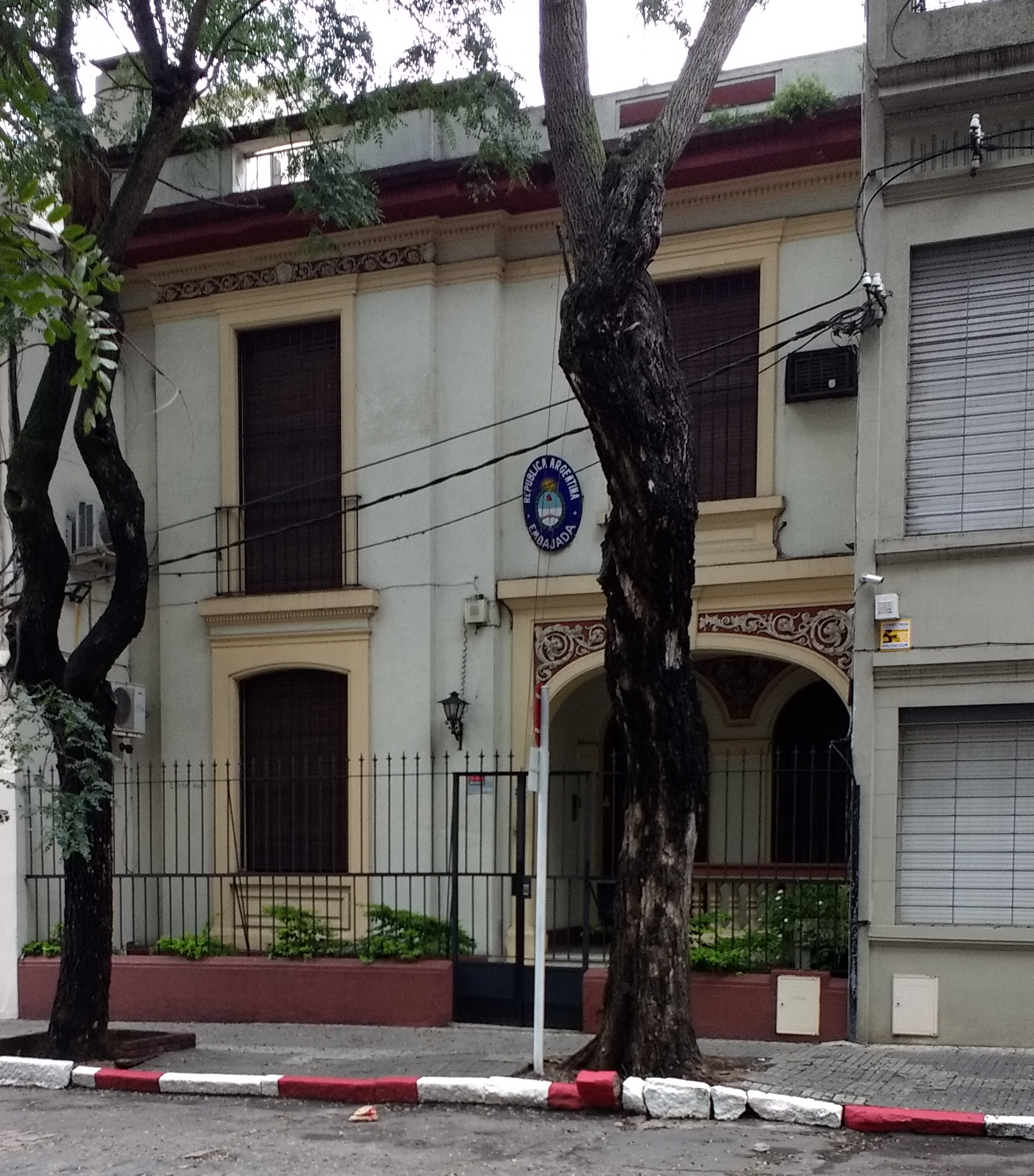
Embassy of Argentina in Montevideo

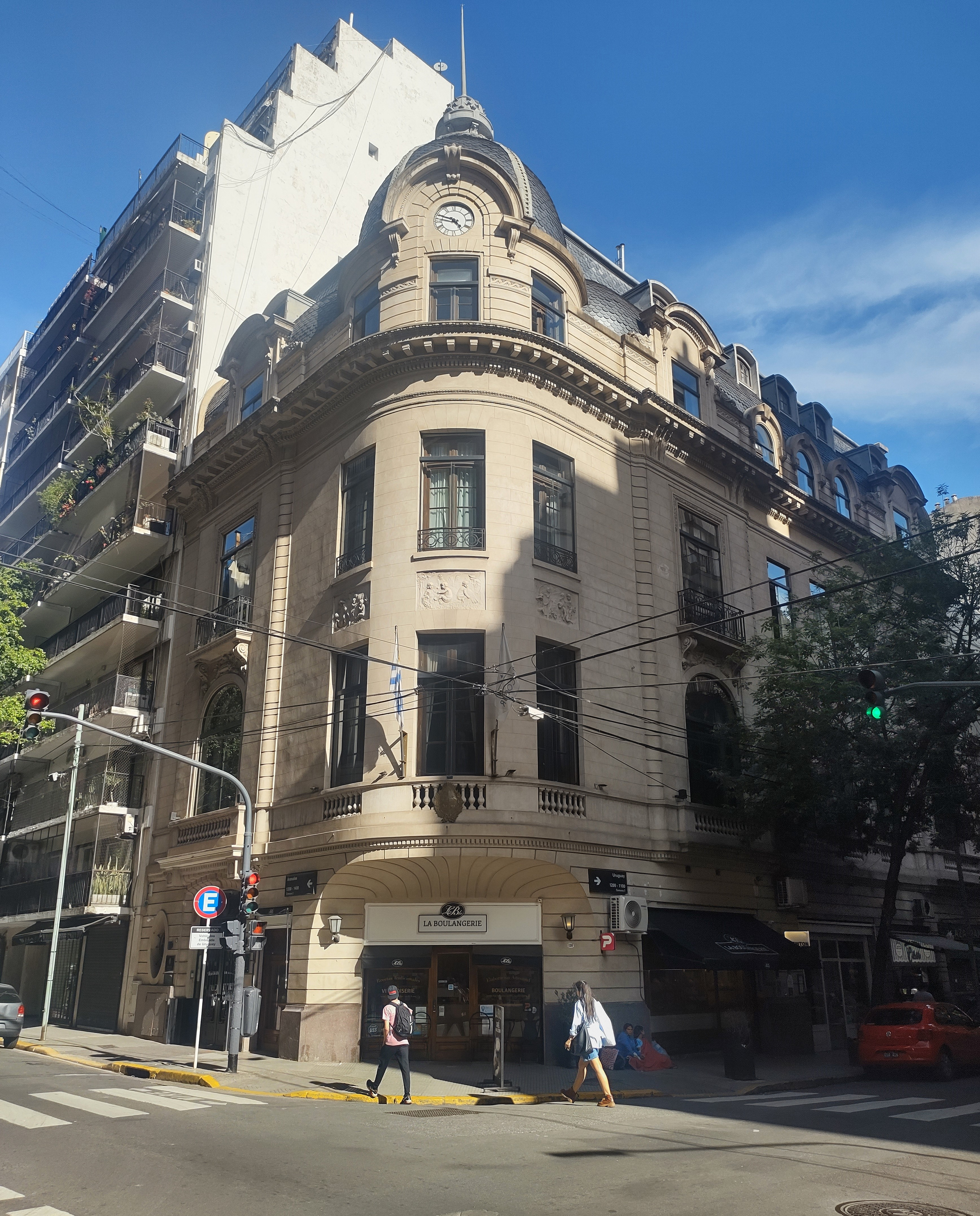
Embassy of Uruguay in Buenos Aires

Argentina–Uruguay relations are the bilateral and historical ties between the Argentine Republic and the Oriental Republic of Uruguay have existed for over a century. Both countries were part of the Spanish Empire until the early 19th century. Both countries are members of the World Trade Organization and the United Nations.

== History ==
Initially, both modern states of Argentina and Uruguay were part of the Spanish empire's Viceroyalty of the Río de la Plata. Buenos Aires was by then the capital city, and the Banda Oriental a province of it. During this period, both Buenos Aires and Montevideo faced two British invasions of the Río de la Plata. In the first one, the British successfully invaded Buenos Aires, being defeated later by a Montevidean army led by Santiago de Liniers. The British invaded Montevideo the second time, but failed to invade Buenos Aires, and Buenos Aires demanded the liberation of Montevideo in the British capitulation.

The Spanish king Ferdinand VII was captured in 1808 during the Peninsular War, and replaced by the French Joseph Bonaparte. He was not recognized as a legitimate king, which left the Spanish monarchy without a ruler. This generated political reactions all across the Spanish Empire. Despite being of French ancestry, Liniers rejected Joseph's rule and confirmed his allegiance to the captive king, but Javier de Elío did not trust him, and created a government Junta in Montevideo. Martín de Álzaga, Elío's ally in Buenos Aires, attempted to do the same by organizing a mutiny, but failed. Elío gave up his junta when Liniers was replaced by a new viceroy, Baltasar Hidalgo de Cisneros. However, as the Spanish situation in the Peninsular War worsened, Buenos Aires deposed Cisneros during the May Revolution and create their own junta. This started the Argentine War of Independence. Montevideo was declared then the new capital of the viceroyalty, and became a Royalist stronghold. The other populations of the Banda Oriental, however, did not join Montevideo. Led by José Gervasio Artigas, they made the cry of Asencio and laid siege to the city until its defeat.

Uruguay gained its independence in 1828 after the Cisplatine War, with the help of Great Britain. During the Uruguayan Civil War, Argentina supported the National Party. Both countries were allied during the War of the Triple Alliance.

Since the end of the 19th century, both countries have shared a similar European heritage. They likewise share very close economic, cultural and political ties with each other. Moreover, both countries are home to significant communities of immigrants from the other, whose presence is often less perceptible due to strong cultural and linguistic similarities.

== Political ties ==
The two major political parties of Uruguay before 2002, the Colorado Party and the National Party, which were both called traditional parties, had their origins in extinct Argentine parties, the Unitarians and the Federals, who, in turn, were descendants of groups led by José Artigas. During the first century of Uruguayan independence, major events on both sides were linked to an international, two-party alliance/rivalry that constituted separate nationalized structures. The Argentine Civil War started after the Uruguayan Civil War in 1838 when Uruguayan ex-president Fructuoso Rivera deposed former Uruguayan president Manuel Oribe, who was exiled to Buenos Aires.

== Boundary disputes ==
The border between Argentina and Uruguay was first established at the 1827 Peace Convention. In the period between the Peace Convention and the 1973 Boundary Treaty, which established most of the contemporary borders between the two countries, the Uruguayan–Argentine border was along the River Uruguay.

According to Zeballos's Doctrine, designed by Argentine Chancellor Estanislao Severo Zeballos, Uruguay should have no jurisdiction over the River Plate, which should only belong to Argentina.

During José Figueroa Alcorta's Argentine presidency in the early 1900s, three major incidents occurred:

- Industrial Argentine fishing on the Uruguayan border.
- The shipwreck of the Argentine naval ship Constitución near Colonia Department.
- War exercises conducted by the Argentine Army near the Uruguayan coast.

== Diplomatic scandals ==
During the presidency of Jorge Batlle in Uruguay, a journalist caused a significant diplomatic incident in 2002 when the President's off-topic commentary was aired on Uruguayan television, showing Batlle saying that "Argentines are all thieves." The incident was resolved after one week when Batlle publicly apologized on Argentine television.

More unfiltered commentary from Uruguayan president José Mujica was aired during a meeting where he said that "with the Turk we were better but with this old lady there is no deal", making reference to Argentine leaders Carlos Menem and Cristina Kirchner.

During a speech, Cristina Kirchner stated that "José Gervasio Artigas wanted to be Argentine and we did not let him"; this statement was discussed in Uruguay for some time.

== Strained relations during the Kirchner era ==
Following the announced construction of a pulp mill in Fray Bentos on the Uruguayan side of the Uruguay River by Spanish manufacturer ENCE in 2003, both countries experienced their first significant diplomatic tensions since 1952, when Argentina President Juan Perón attempted to curb Argentine offshore banking in Uruguay.

Argentinians from the Gualeguaychú, Entre Ríos area blocked the Libertador General San Martín Bridge over the River Uruguay in 2005 many times for over a year, as well as the General Artigas Bridge, due to pollution concerns. Though plans for the ENCE mill were canceled in 2005, a second mill was announced by Finland's Botnia company in 2005, and the facility was opened in 2007. The Pulp mill dispute between Argentina and Uruguay remains a subject of controversy, particularly after ongoing reports of growing water contamination in the area that was later identified to be sewage discharge from the actual town of Gualeguaychú.

== Today ==
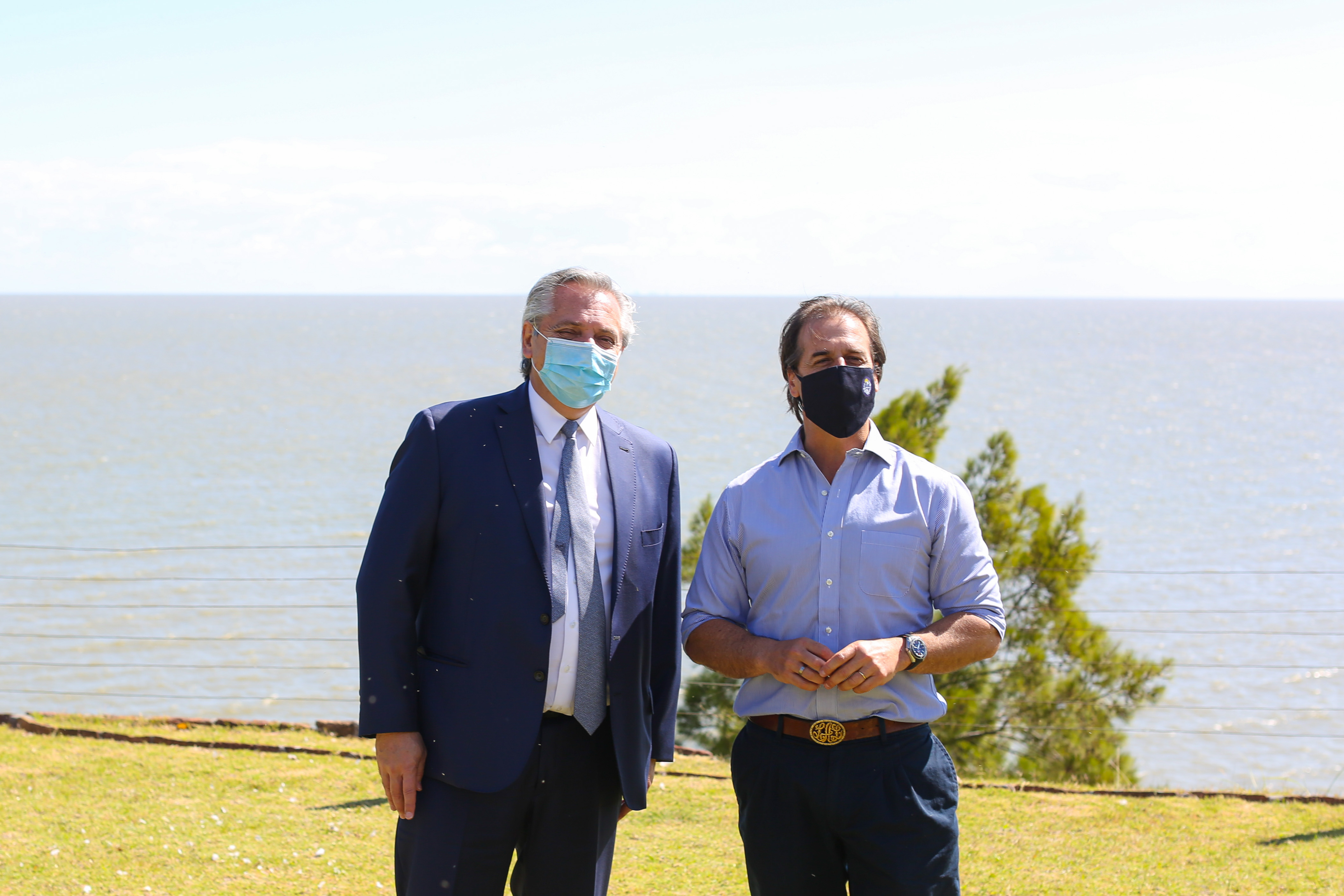
Presidents Alberto Fernández and Luis Lacalle Pou in 2020.

Argentina has an embassy in Montevideo and four consulates in Colonia del Sacramento, Fray Bentos, Paysandú, and Salto. Uruguay has an embassy in Buenos Aires; two general consulates in Córdoba and Rosario; three consulates in Colón, Concordia and Gualeguaychú; and two honorary consulates in Mendoza and Neuquén.

Both countries were founding members of Mercosur. Both countries are full members of the Group of 77, the Rio Group, the Latin American Integration Association, the Association of Spanish Language Academies, the Organization of American States, the Organization of Ibero-American States, the Union of South American Nations, and the Cairns Group.

In 2009, Uruguay maintained its policy of refusing landing rights to British military planes on flights to the Falkland Islands (Spanish: Islas Malvinas), and in 2010, it refused HMS Gloucester entry into the Port of Montevideo.

One of the most important commercial relationships between Uruguay and Argentina is related to tourism. For Uruguay, Argentine tourism is key since it represents 56% of the external tourism the country receives each year, and 70% during the summer months. As of 2025, 2.5 million people travel across the River Plate.

In 2017, Argentina and Uruguay signed a Memorandum of Understanding for the implementation of the "Strengthening Connectivity" (Fortalecimiento de la Conectividad) project. This project is focused on improving communication between the countries. It aims to develop greater connectivity by creating fiber-optic links to interconnection points where international internet providers are located and to submarine cables that reach the Argentine coast.

== See also ==
- Argentines in Uruguay
- Uruguayans in Argentina
