= Salto Grande Bridge =

Libertador General San Martín Bridge
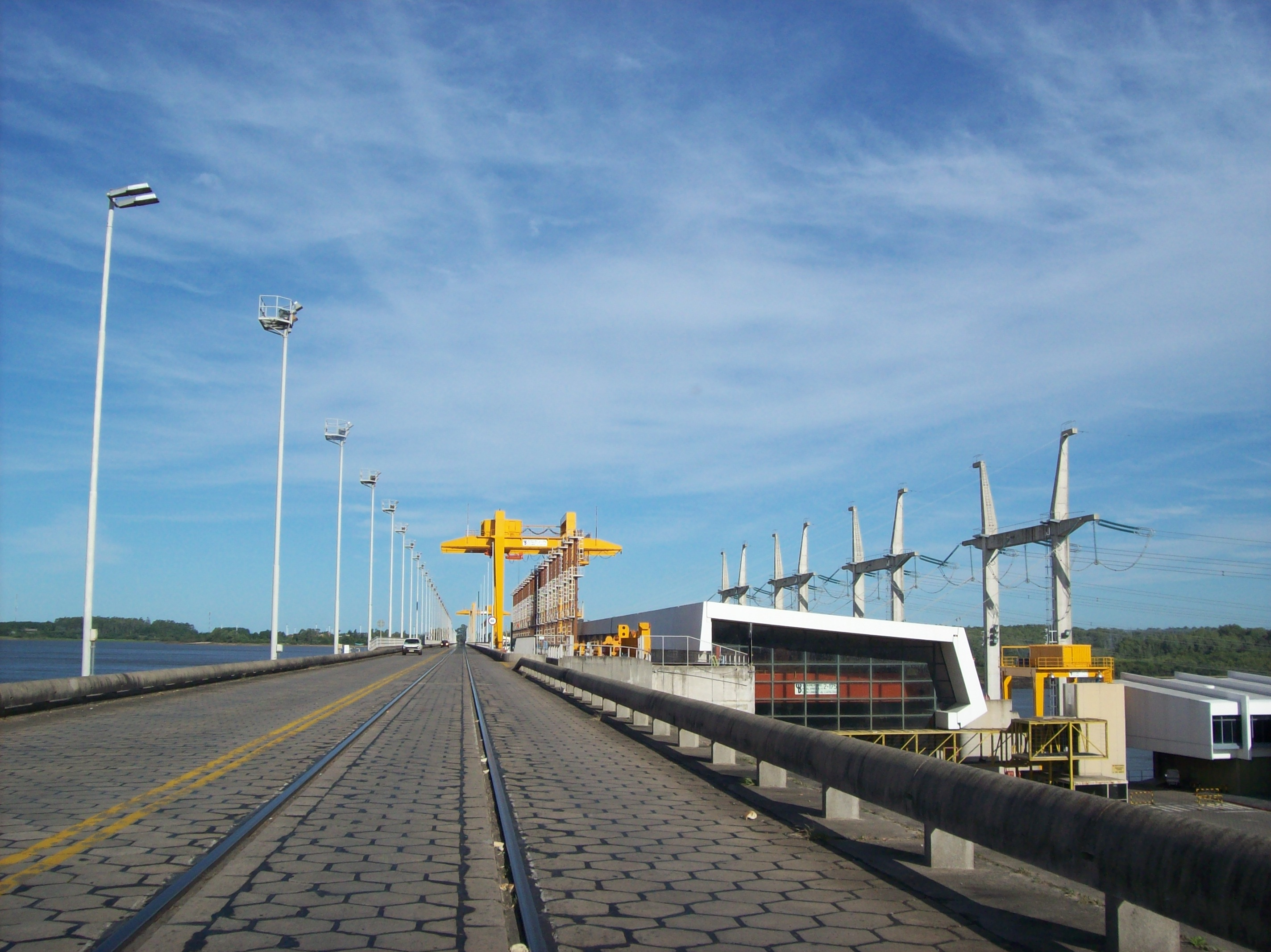
- Coordinates: 31°16′30″S 57°56′18″W
- Crosses: Uruguay River
- Locale: Concordia, Entre Ríos Province, Argentina. Salto, Salto Department, Uruguay
- Preceded by: Paso de los Libres–Uruguaiana International Bridge
- Followed by: General Artigas Bridge

Characteristics
- Design: Bridge over hydroelectric dam

History
- Construction start: April 1, 1974
- Opened: August 25, 1982

Location
- Interactive map of Libertador General San Martín Bridge

The Salto Grande Bridge is a road and railroad bridge that crosses the Uruguay River and joins Argentina and Uruguay. It is built on top of the Salto Grande Dam. The bridge runs between Concordia, Entre Ríos, Argentina, and Salto, Uruguay.

== See also ==
- Libertador General San Martín Bridge
- General Artigas Bridge
- Cellulose plant conflict between Argentina and Uruguay
- List of international bridges
