= Embassy of Uruguay, Buenos Aires =

Chief diplomatic mission of Uruguay in Argentina

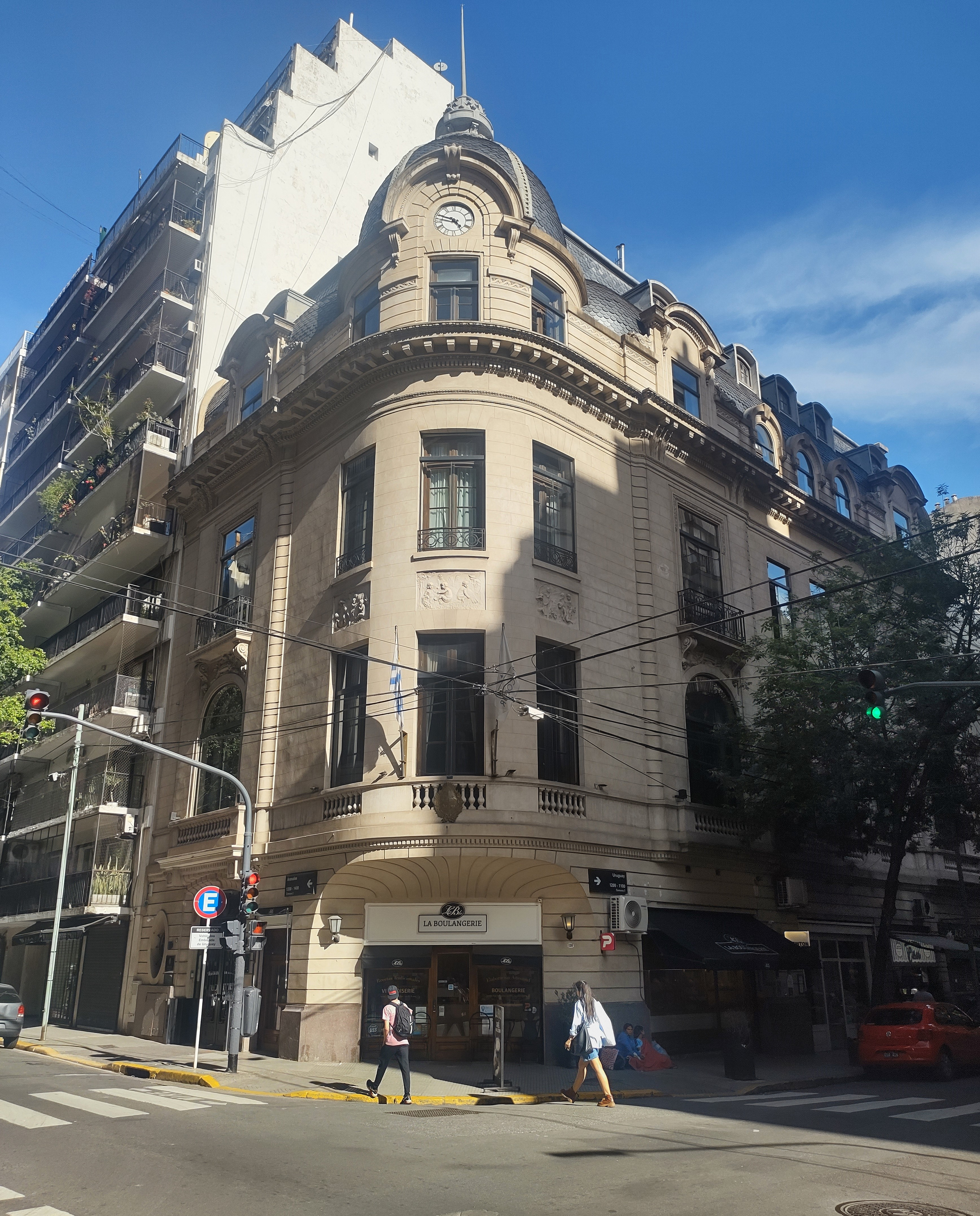
- Embassy of Uruguay in Buenos Aires
- Location: Buenos Aires, Argentina
- Address: Arenales 1392; Buenos Aires, Argentina
- Ambassador: Diego Cánepa Baccino
- Website: Uruguayan Embassy, Montevideo

The Embassy of Uruguay in Buenos Aires is the chief diplomatic mission of Uruguay in Argentina. Since 2018 the Embassy has been located in a building on the edge of the Recoleta and Retiro neighborhoods. The current Uruguayan Ambassador to Argentina is Diego Cánepa Baccino.

== History ==
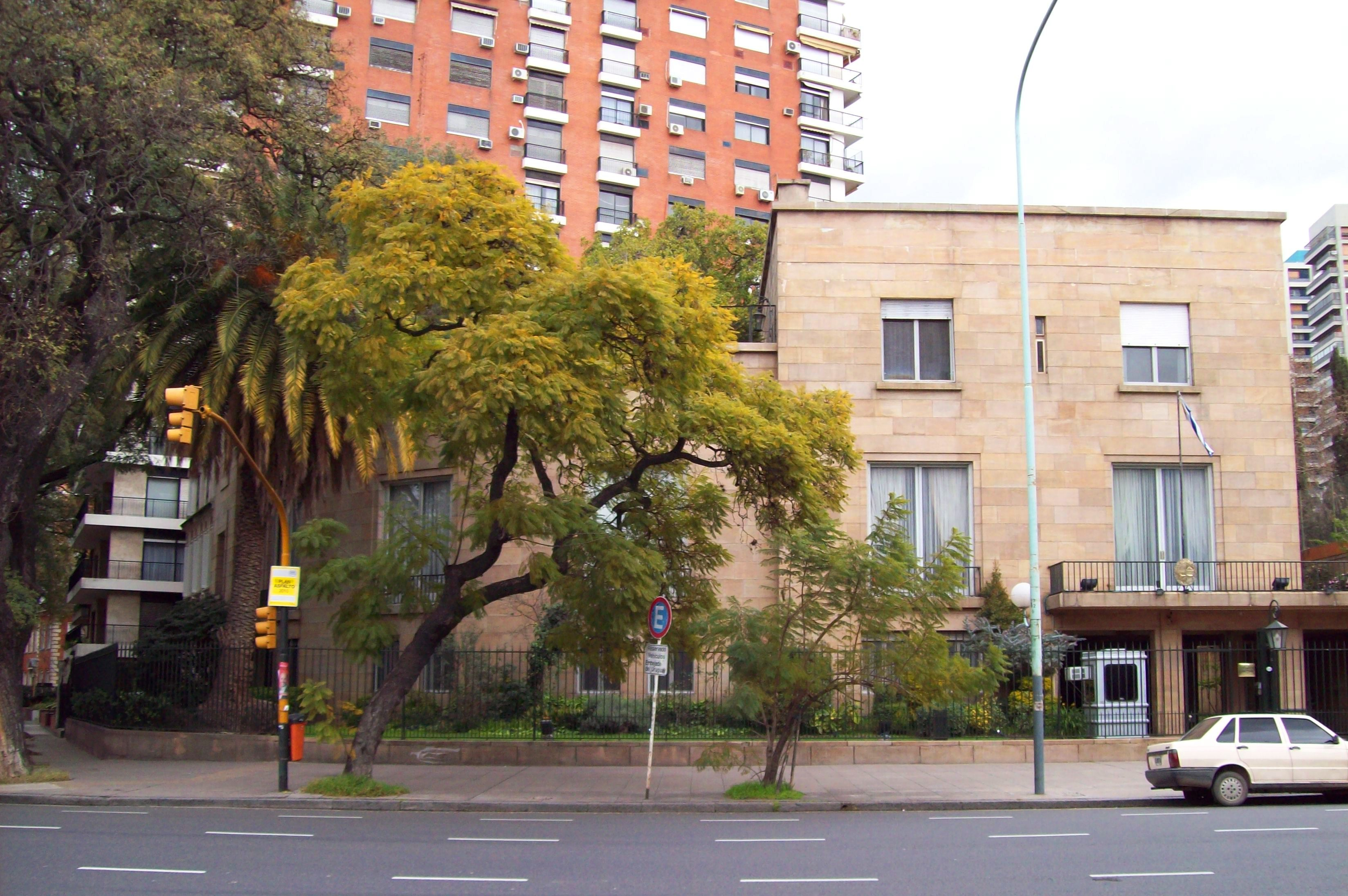
Residence of the Uruguayan Ambassador in Argentina

In 1982 the embassy was opened in a nine-story building on Las Heras Avenue in the Recoleta neighborhood. However, in 2012, President José Mujica ordered the relocation of the mission, alleging high maintenance costs for the building. The functions of the embassy were transferred to the residence of the ambassador, while the consulate was installed in the building of the Buenos Aires branch of Banco de la República Oriental del Uruguay.

Since June 19, 2018, the embassy and consulate general have operated in their current location, in a neoclassical building built in 1913.

== Ambassador's residence ==
The residence of the Uruguayan ambassador to Argentina has been located in the Villa del Parque neighborhood since December 1948. In a rationalist style, it was designed by the Hungarian architect Jorge Kalnay in the 1930s.

== See also ==
- Argentina–Uruguay relations
- List of diplomatic missions of Uruguay
- List of diplomatic missions in Argentina
