= Evangelina Carrozzo =

Argentine model, beauty queen and dancer

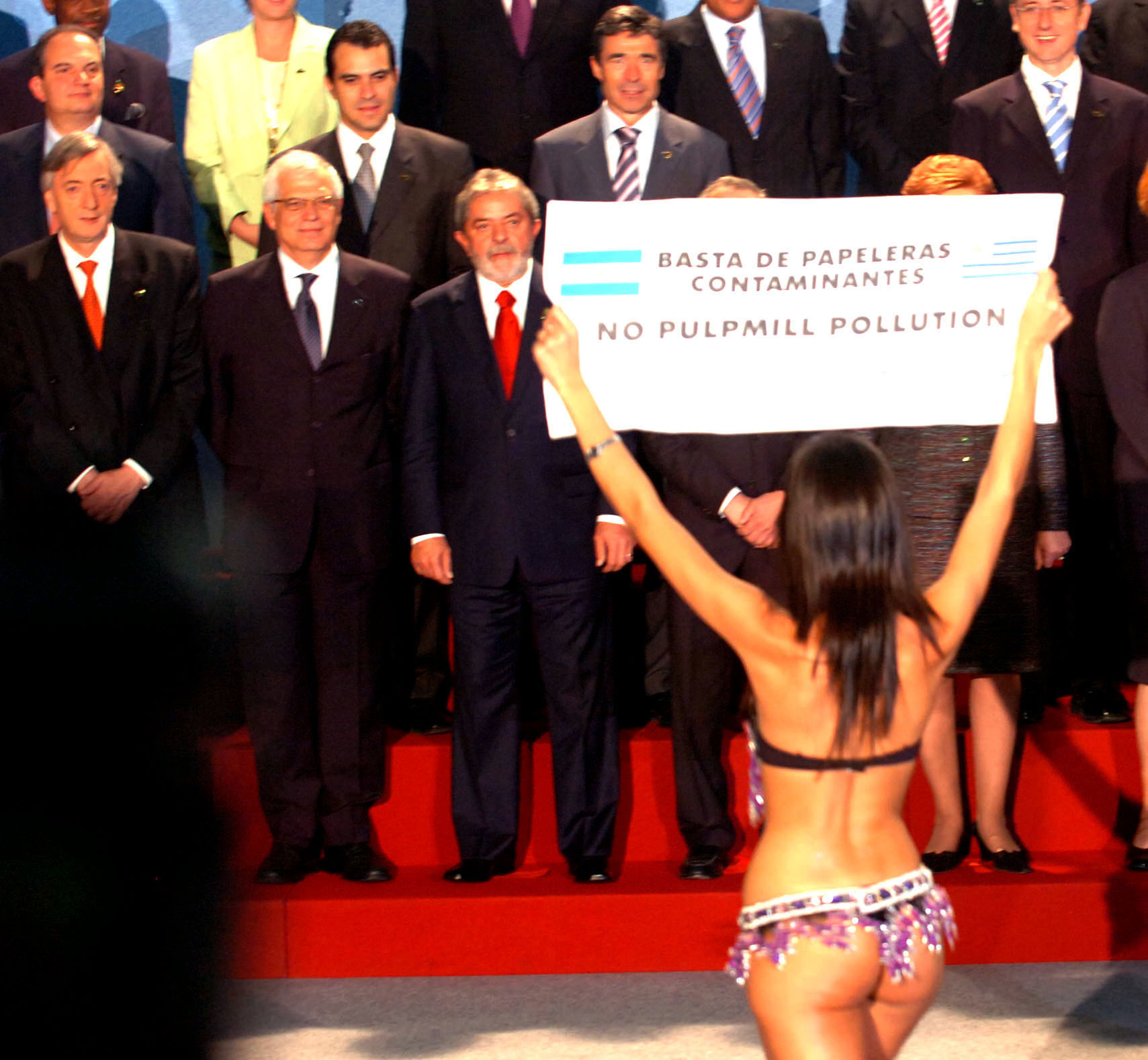
- Carrozzo in 2006
- Born: 19 November 1980 (age 44); Buenos Aires, Argentina
- Occupation(s): Glamour model and actress
- Modeling information
- Height: 1.71 m (5 ft 7 1/2 in)

Evangelina Carrozzo (born 1980) is an Argentine model, beauty queen and dancer. She gained international attention for her actions during an international Presidential summit held on May 12, 2006.

== Childhood ==
Evangelina Carrozzo grew up in Gualeguaychú, Entre Ríos, Argentina (a town that borders with Uruguay).

== May 12 events ==
Carrozzo had won the regional queen of Guayleguaychú title months before she participated in the international Presidents' reunion. At the time, a controversy was heating up between Argentina and Uruguay as Uruguayan paper factories had set foot near Gualeguaychu, and Gualeguaychu residents were growing impatient at the situation. As weeks progressed, the situation gained international attention.

Carrozzo became involved with Greenpeace, and the association allegedly sponsored her on her trip to Vienna, with a presscard to bring along. She had 15 days to plan her actions.

Carrozzo was able to get into the Presidential meeting by posing as a news reporter. Once inside the building where the meeting was being held, she went into a corner, began stripping her clothes and ran in front of the Presidents as a group picture was about to be taken. By the time the photo was taken, Carrozzo was in front of the Presidents, wearing a bikini and waving a message against the Uruguayan paper factories. She was quickly, but peacefully, retired from the place by security staff. Venezuelan President Hugo Chávez, whom she described as "sociable", allegedly blew a kiss at her.

However, Carrozzo was described by the Uruguayan media as a "bad example of Rioplatense culture".
