= Uruguay River pulp mill dispute =

Dispute between Argentina and Uruguay; resolved by the ICJ in 2010

Coordinates: 33°04′59″S 58°24′00″W

Pulp Mills on the River Uruguay (Argentina v. Uruguay)
- Court: International Court of Justice
- Decided: 20 April 2010

Case history
- Prior action: Uruguay authorized the construction of two pulp mills in the east bank of the River Uruguay
- Subsequent action: Establishment of a joint Scientific Committee within the Administrative Commission of the River Uruguay in order to monitor pollution levels.

The pulp mill dispute was a dispute between Argentina and Uruguay concerning the construction of pulp mills on the Uruguay River. The presidents at the time were Néstor Kirchner (Argentina) and Tabaré Vázquez (Uruguay). As a diplomatic, economic, and public relations conflict between both parties, the dispute also affected tourism and transportation as well as the otherwise amicable relations between the two countries. The feud was unprecedented between the two countries, which have shared historical and cultural ties.

Proceedings were brought before the International Court of Justice as a case formally named Pulp Mills on the River Uruguay (Argentina v. Uruguay). It ruled that, although Uruguay failed to inform Argentina of the operations, it did not pollute the river, so closing the pulp mill would be unjustified. The conflict ended in 2010, during the presidencies of Cristina Fernández de Kirchner (Argentina) and José Mujica (Uruguay), with the establishment of a joint coordination of the activities in the river.

== Origin of the dispute ==
After twenty years of forest industry development, in October 2003, the Spanish company ENCE, received permission from the Uruguayan government to build a pulp mill in Fray Bentos, on the Uruguay River (which forms the natural border north between Brazil and Argentina and in the south between Uruguay and Argentina).

Argentines residing mainly in Gualeguaychú, Entre Ríos, about 35 km from Fray Bentos, had been concerned that ENCE's pulp mill would pollute the river. Also, some demonstrations had been organized against ENCE.

After ENCE received its permit, another company, the Finnish Botnia, made public their intention to consider the same area for another pulp mill. Botnia received the environmental authorization to build a mill in February 2005.

The Uruguay River is shared by the two countries and is protected by a treaty, which requires both parties to inform the other of any project that might affect the river. Besides the issue of pollution, Argentina claimed that the Uruguayan government had not asked for permission to build the mills. Uruguayan authorities countered that the Treaty did not require that permission be obtained, but merely that the other part be appropriately informed, and that conversations had indeed been held and filed, without objections on the Argentine part. In addition, they claimed that the technology used in the mills would avoid polluting the river to the extent claimed by the Argentine government, and that more modern wastewater treatment would have a beneficial effect when used for local sewage treatment as well. Before the construction of the mill, sewage from the city of Fray Bentos was discharged to the river untreated. These claims were backed by neutral expert statements given to the IFC.

== The first protests ==
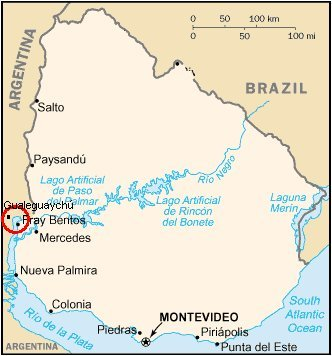
The conflict area

On 30 April 2005, just two months after President Vazquez and his government took power in Uruguay, and two months after the mills were publicly approved, a large group of 10,000–20,000 people (residents of Gualeguaychú and nearby, as well as environmental groups from Argentina) blocked the international Libertador General San Martín Bridge (between Gualeguaychú and Fray Bentos) protesting the installation of the pulp mills. The demonstrations were organized by the Environmental Assembly of Gualeguaychú with the goal of bringing attention to possible negative effects that the mills could have on the environment. The people who participated in the demonstrations hoped that by bringing attention to the conflict, the construction of the mills would be interrupted. If this was not feasible, they hoped, at the very least, that the actions taken by the mills would be improved such that the environment, specifically the river, would not be negatively affected.

Demonstrators did not allow any cars to get through to the bridge. The only vehicles that could drive through it were cars and trucks from farms, as well as Uruguayans who regularly shopped in Argentina (due good exchange rates). However, these Uruguayans would have to park their vehicles near the roadblock and walk through the demonstration and people before they could get in a rental car that drove them to the markets. Protesters agreed that Uruguayan shoppers were allowed to walk through the demonstration safely and without maltreatment. Furthermore, their vehicles were not attacked.

In September 2005, the Center for Human Rights and Environment (CEDHA) filed a complaint to the Compliance Advisory Ombudsman (CAO) of the World Bank (which oversees IFC project compliance with social and environmental norms). The CAO eventually released two reports, a preliminary report and an audit. The audit report was critical of the procedures the IFC followed pertaining to the project.

A draft cumulative impact study of the two mills by the International Finance Corporation (IFC) of the World Bank was released on 19 December. According to it, the technical requirements of the mills had been fulfilled and the quality of the water and the air in the region should not be harmed. The IFC said it would wait for further consultations to be made before finalizing the study and thus before financing the projects.

On 23 December, about 50 Gualeguaychú residents again blocked Route 136 and the General San Martín Bridge, using rubble, logs and vehicles. The block, slated for 8 a.m., started at 5 a.m., angering many drivers who were forced to take a detour to the next bridge, which goes from Colón to Paysandú. Later this bridge was blocked as well. Many Argentines usually travel to Uruguay in the summer, often beginning immediately before Christmas.

== Legal and diplomatic escalation ==
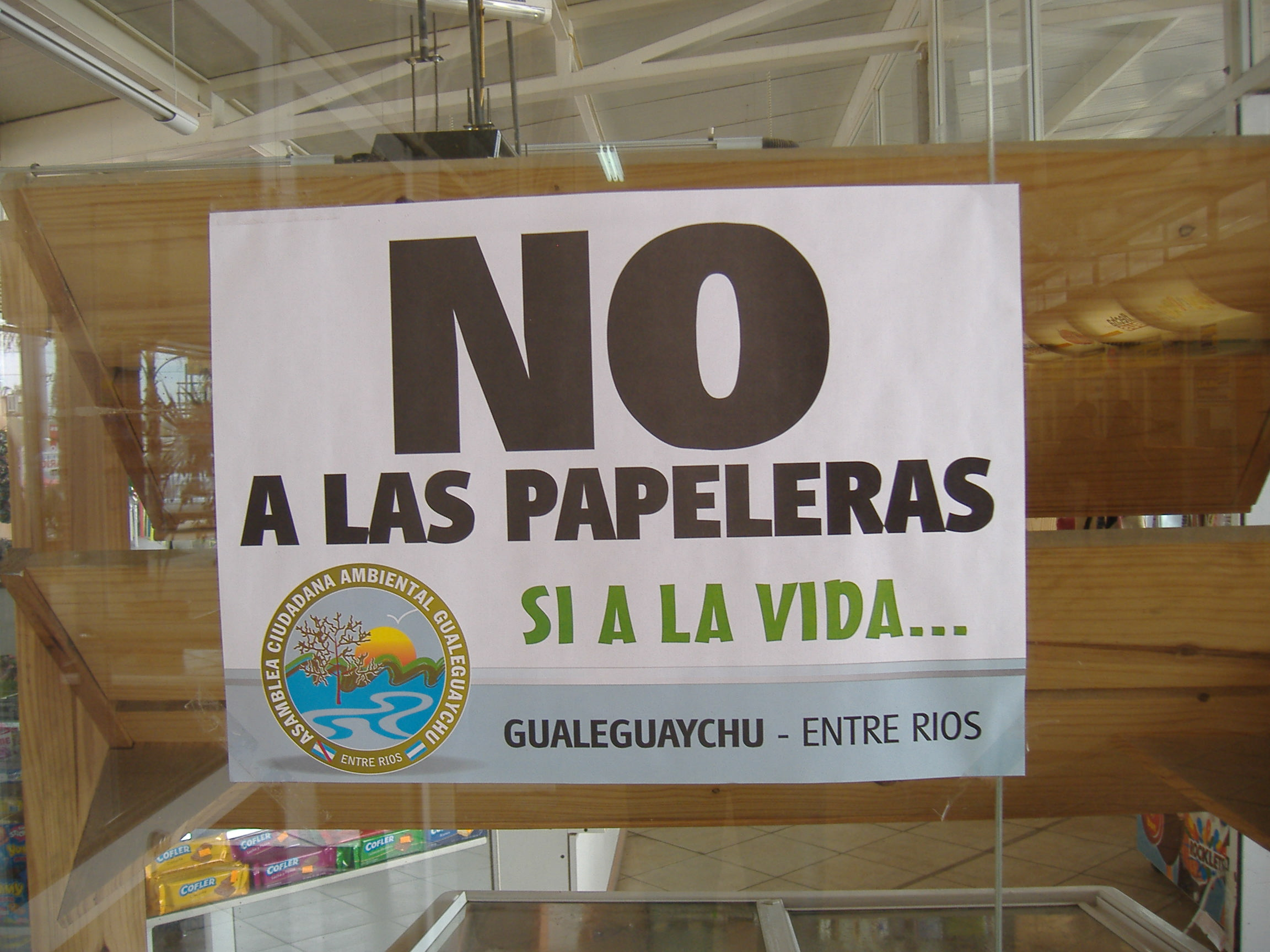
A sign against the paper mills in a shop in Gualeguaychú

On 26 December, the Uruguayan chancellor Reinaldo Gargano accused Argentina of violating Mercosur regulations on freedom of circulation of goods, and spoke to Argentine chancellor Jorge Taiana, requesting that measures be taken to avoid harming the tourist season. A few hours later, Argentina ratified the protest, asked to suspend the factories' construction, and threatened to make the matter a legal conflict.

The Citizens' Environmental Assembly of Gualeguaychú simultaneously blocked the three bridges that link the province of Entre Ríos with Uruguay on 30 December 2005. The following days saw intermittent blockades and protests, with volunteers handing pamphlets and explaining the passers-by the reasons for their rejection of the paper factories.

Argentine Head of Environmental Affairs, Raúl Estrada Oyuela, went on record proposing to boycott the production of the mills. On 2 January 2006 the Uruguayan government rejected this forcefully. The municipal intendant of Río Negro Department, Omar Lafluf, said that most Uruguayans supported the factories; a survey released on 5 January showed that only 16% were against them.

At this point, Greenpeace activists met with Uruguayan officials to request suspension of the works. The Uruguayan government prepared a pamphlet to be handed out to Argentine tourists, informing them of the technical aspects of environmental safety of the factories. The roadblocks soon became scheduled events. Greenpeace later refused to take any further action, claiming that as long as Botnia does not pollute the river and follows the same conditions requested to build and run a mill of this sort in Europe, there is no problem with the pulp mill at all.

Chile became indirectly involved, as several Chilean trucks carrying equipment and materials for the Botnia project across Argentina were detained by the roadblocks before they could cross the border to Uruguay near the end of their journey.

Responding to a request by governor Busti, on 25 January 2006 the Argentine national government announced it would take the issue to the International Court of Justice in The Hague, accusing Uruguay of violating the bilateral Treaty of Uruguay River dealing with the conservation of the Uruguay River; Uruguay's chancellor Gargano called this "a grave step" which bypassed and ignored the institutions of the Mercosur, and said Uruguay would protest the lack of action of the Argentine government with regards to the roadblocks at the Controversy Resolution Tribunal of Asunción.

On 30 January the High Level Technical Group (Grupo Técnico de Alto Nivel, GTAN), a joint Argentine-Uruguayan commission for the study of the impact of the paper factories, ended deliberations with the two countries issuing separate statements. The Argentine Foreign Ministry accused the Uruguayan members of GTAN of withholding information, which the Uruguayan officials denied. The GTAN had met 180 days before, as mandated by the Uruguay River Statute.

The government of Entre Ríos, in the meantime, distributed 100,000 pamphlets about the paper factories and their alleged impact among those attending the Cosquín music festival in Córdoba, which ended on 29 January.

== February 2006 ==
On 6 February 2006 Uruguayan President Tabaré Vázquez acknowledged that he had spoken on the phone to Argentine President Néstor Kirchner the previous week, in order to look for a solution of the conflict. Regardless, he also announced that in any event the construction of the mills would not be halted by the Uruguayan government.

On 3 February 2006 members of the Gualeguaychú Environmental Assembly had started a long-term blockade of Route 136, leading to the Libertador General San Martín Bridge and to Fray Bentos. Several votes were taken on the issue, in every case resolving to maintain the blockade.

At the beginning of the blockade, Jorge Eduardo Lozano, designated bishop of Gualeguaychú, stated that he supported the protesters because theirs was "a just cause", though he also spoke of the need to look for "reasonable alternatives". The archbishop of Montevideo, Nicolás Cotugno, offered to mediate.

In the meantime, the citizens of Gualeguaychú, after an assembly, rejected the mediation of Nobel Peace Prize-winner Adolfo Pérez Esquivel; he had asked them to end the blockades while talks were conducted.

On 12 February about 400 people, gathered by the Colón Environmental Assembly, went in nearly 100 vehicles from Colón (100 km north of Gualeguaychú) to the international General Artigas Bridge, demonstrating there and creating a traffic disruption. This temporal measure was followed, on 16 February, by a blockade of Route 135 and the bridge, which links Colón with Paysandú in Uruguay.

All these earlier actions were targeted to impact the public hearings of Cumulative Impact Study, held by IFC on 14 and 16 in both Montevideo and Buenos Aires.

On 20 February the Uruguayan government decided to accuse Argentina before the Organization of American States, for its lack of action on the matter of the blocks. The same day, the Supreme Court of Argentina rejected the case presented by Argentines against Uruguay, returning it to Guillermo Quadrini, federal judge of Concepción del Uruguay.

The School of Chemistry of the University of the Republic, Uruguay, released an open letter to Uruguayan society on 22 February. They reported that TCF-derived paper can be recycled fewer times than ECF-derived paper. The TCF process is 5% more expensive, and needs 10% more fuel and wood to make the same amount of paper than ECF process; therefore, it releases 10% more greenhouse gases. The letter stated that ECF and TCF are accepted as "best available technologies" in developed countries, and toxic emissions are minimal (specially dioxins), which implies that emissions depend on management and controls, not on whether TCF or ECF processes are used.

== March 2006 ==
During their state visits to Chile on 11 March for the inauguration of President Michelle Bachelet, Presidents Néstor Kirchner and Tabaré Vázquez met and discussed the situation personally. They jointly asked the participants for the suspension of both the construction of the pulp mills and the roadblocks, in order to discuss the matter. Two new meetings were scheduled, to take place in Anchorena, Uruguay, and Mar del Plata, Argentina. In the following days President Vázquez was harshly criticised by the political opposition and backtracked publicly, stating that Uruguay "will not negotiate under pressure". The Gualeguaychú Environmental Assembly met with Governor Busti to hear the proposal, but then decided to keep the blockade for the moment and reconsider.

On 16 March about 10,000 people demonstrated in Fray Bentos, Uruguay for the pulp mills.

=== Gualeguaychú lifts the blockade ===
The Assembly gathered again, with an unusually large attendance, on 20 March. After discussing several proposals, they voted to lift the blockades on Route 136 and the Libertador General San Martín Bridge (which had lasted 45 days), starting the following day, and wait 7 days for the Uruguayan government to reciprocate (suspending the construction of the mills in order to discuss). Uruguayan Chancellor Gargano had previously stated that freeing the roads was a sine qua non condition to start negotiations. The Environmental Assembly of Colón, on the other hand, decided to continue blocking Route 135 and the international pass over the General Artigas Bridge, 80 km north of Gualeguaychú.

=== Suspension of works ===
On 26 March, one of the companies building the pulp mills, Botnia, announced that it would suspend the installation works for 90 days "in order to contribute to the opening of dialogue and answering to the request of Presidents Tabaré Vázquez and Néstor Kirchner." Botnia is so far the largest private investment in the history of Uruguay, and it had completed 45% of the project, but not started the mills themselves. The news caused concern among European stockholders. ENCE, whose construction had not yet started at all, also informally agreed to suspend the works.

Soon afterwards, the ombudsman of the World Bank, Meg Taylor, concluded that the review carried out by the IFC about the pulp mills had been "incomplete" and its procedures not rigorous enough. These conclusions were delivered to the government of Entre Ríos, which in turn passed them on to President Kirchner to be analyzed in the upcoming presidential meeting in Colonia, Uruguay.

On 30 March, Botnia sent the construction workers union (SUNCA) a communique which stated that the suspension had been revised and work should continue normally. The company would halt the works for only ten days. When this was confirmed, the Colonia meeting, which had been postponed once already, was cancelled. On 5 April, after deliberations, the Gualeguaychú Assembly resumed the blockade of Route 136.

== April 2006 ==
The relationship between the political actors of both countries became tense after the resumption of the blockade. Catholic Church leaders in both vowed to facilitate the dialogue (though specifically not to act as mediators). The governments of Finland and Spain denied the possibility of intervening in the affairs involving Botnia and ENCE. The Finnish Minister of Foreign Trade and Cooperation for Development, Paula Lehtomäki, cancelled a visit to Argentina citing a concern that she might not be welcome, and stated that the conflict was to be solved among Argentina, Uruguay and the two private companies.

Uruguay threatened to resort to the World Trade Organization, since the blockades "violate basic principles of international commerce" and were not cleared by the Argentine authorities, thus causing an economic loss to Uruguay (which they estimated at $400 million). The Uruguayan government also considered a demand on the International Court of Justice, claiming that the blockades have violated human rights by preventing the free circulation of persons and goods.

During an official visit to Mexico, Uruguayan president Tabaré Vázquez said that "while leaders are talking about an integration process, one of these countries" (Argentina) "is discriminating against another one with a blockade." He added that that was "a policy of disintegration", and proposed, once more, to discuss the issue using Mercosur's established institutions.

== May – July 2006 ==
On 3 May Argentina formally presented its complaint before the International Court of Justice, accusing Uruguay of violating of the Uruguay River Statute by authorizing the construction of the mills without prior consultation with Argentina.

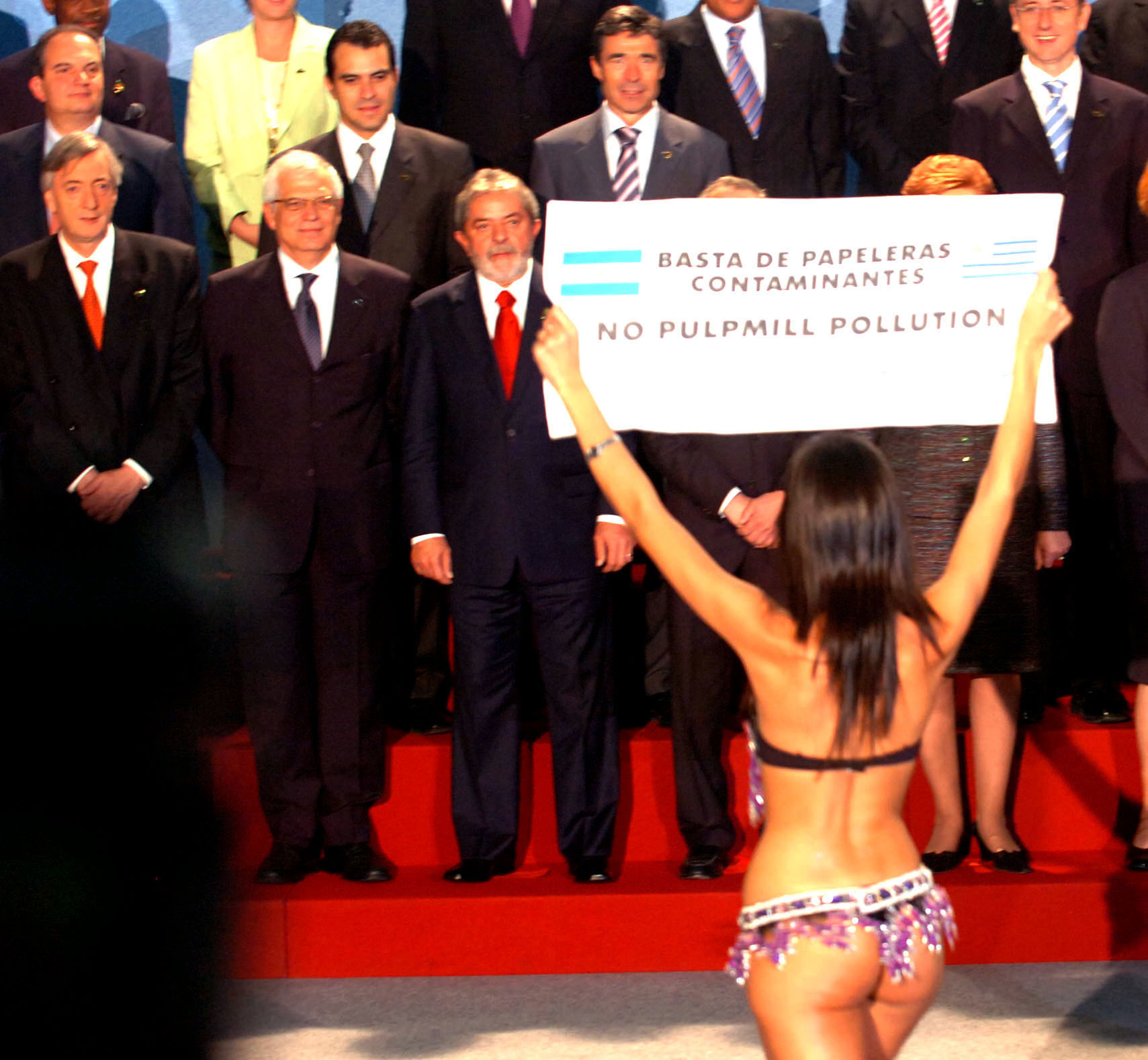
Evangelina Carrozzo protesting the mill during a political meeting.

On 11 May, at the opening of the European Union, Latin America and Caribbean Business Summit in Vienna, President Kirchner gave a speech reiterating the accusations against Uruguay, and also accused the developed countries of applying a double standard with respect to pollution controls. The presidents' official photo shooting was briefly interrupted by the presence of the Queen of the Carnival of Gualeguaychú, 26-year-old Evangelina Carrozzo, who had entered the event along with a Greenpeace activist, both with press passes obtained by a weekly newspaper of Morón, Buenos Aires whose director has collaborated with environmentalists before. As the shooting was about to begin, Carrozzo swiftly took off her overcoat (leaving her wearing only a tasselled bikini), produced a paper banner that read "No pulpmill pollution" in Spanish and English, and paraded with it before the 58 heads of state, before being taken away by security.

On 17 May 150 members of the Gualeguaychú Environmental Assembly travelled to Buenos Aires and, together with Carrozzo and some 200 local activists, they demonstrated in front of the embassies of Finland and Sweden. Jukka Uosukainen, head of the International Relations of the Finnish Environment Ministry, acknowledged concerns that the conflict is harming the country's reputation on environmental issues, and said that Argentine officials were invited to visit pulp mills in Finland but they refused.

On 27 June, environmental activist Romina Picolotti was appointed to preside the Argentine Secretariat of Environment and Sustainable Development. Picolotti, a lawyer who founded and presided the Center for Human Rights and Environment (CEDHA), used to counsel not only the Gualeguaychú Assembly, but also Entre Ríos governor Busti. The CEDHA, now presided by Picolotti's husband Daniel Taillant, provided legal advice to the Argentine case at the ICJ, and later organized a tour of several countries to raise international awareness of the pulp mills and present arguments against their construction.

=== The case at the ICJ ===
Argentina sued Uruguay in the International Court of Justice, arguing that it had breached a treaty obligation to consult before doing anything that might affect the river. However, in July the court rejected its request for an injunction to stop construction of the mills. Uruguay took its case to Mercosur, arguing that Argentina had failed to take action to ensure the free circulation of goods and services. During their defense at the ICJ, the Uruguayan authorities pointed to the fact that the mills were to use a technology known as Elemental Chlorine-Free (or ECF) bleaching (employing chlorine dioxide), which has been adopted by both the United States and the European Union as the "best available technology" in their wood pulp processing environmental regulations, and that an independent World Bank study has supported their position. As to the alleged violation of the Treaty of the Uruguay River, Uruguay's legal defense team asserted that discussions over the building of the mills were conducted, and that Argentine officials offered no objections.

After two months of calm while the International Court of Justice in The Hague studied the Argentine accusation, the conflict was re-ignited on 13 July, when the ICJ ruled that Argentina had not convinced the court that Uruguay's actions at present were enough to grant a provisional measure halting the construction of the two pulp mills. This judgment did not settle the question of whether Uruguay is ultimately breaching its Treaty obligations to Argentina, but ruled that no imminent danger of irreparable damage exists at the moment, and that Uruguay may still be liable to Argentina if it is later found in the final judgment that Uruguay is indeed in breach of Treaty obligations. Judges at the ICJ voted 14–1 in Uruguay's favour (the only vote against Uruguay was cast by the judge appointed by Argentina). The next day, the Gualeguaychú Assembly organized a protest demonstration, with cars, bicycles and people on foot marching along National Route 14 and finally gathering in the city. According to Assembly leaders, new road blockades will be avoided, at least until the summer. A similar but smaller protest march took place in Colón.

== August – September 2006 ==
On 6 August 2006, taking advantage of the high circulation of vehicles due to the winter vacations, residents of Concepción del Uruguay, Gualeguaychú, Colón and other towns, along with some Uruguayan families, handed out flyers to drivers along National Route 14, to raise awareness about the risks of pollution and inform them about their demands. Traffic was slowed down, but not blocked.

=== Uruguay's demands before the MERCOSUR Tribunal ===
Starting in June, Uruguay demanded before the Mercosur Tribunal that Argentina be punished for the blockades, and that it be forced to pay reparations, following the Treaty of Asunción, which guarantees the free circulation of goods and services between Mercosur members. On 9 August, Uruguayan representatives presented their claims, centered in two points: first, that the blockades during the summer had caused grave economic damage to Uruguay (calculated in $400 million losses); and second, that the Argentine government did not act to prevent or lift the blockades.

Argentine witnesses testified, instead, that the Kirchner administration did have an active stance and tried to soften the effects of the blockades, and showed that there had been a 33% increase in the bilateral trade between the period January–May 2005 and the same period of 2006 despite the blocks.

Uruguay also demanded that the Argentine government be forced to act in case of future blockades. The Argentine Foreign Relations Ministry was reportedly confident that the tribunal would not heed such demands, since hypothetical future violations are not subject to it, according to jurisprudence, and moreover, that the tribunal's dictates would remain symbolical, given that the blockades were discontinued, even before Uruguay's demands were presented.

The tribunal, an ad hoc assembly formed by three arbiters (one Argentine, one Uruguayan and one Spanish) gathered in Asunción, heard the allegations and, on 7 September, ruled that Argentina had acted "on good faith", and rejected the request for monetary sanctions, but it noted the blockades had caused "undeniable inconveniences to both Uruguayan and Argentine trade, in addition the violation of the free circulation right." Both governments acknowledged the tribunal's report as positive to their respective causes.

=== ENCE cancels Fray Bentos project ===
On 20 September 2006, the management of ENCE's mill dismissed 40 of its employees. The implicit cancellation of the project was confirmed the next day, when the company's president Juan Luis Arregui announced that the construction of the Fray Bentos mill (some earthworks only started) would not be continued, though there are plans to relocate the project to another region in Uruguay. Arregui also said that they "might have made a mistake" and explained why, in his view, "there cannot be two [pulp] mills in Fray Bentos." According to Arregui, Fray Bentos lacks sufficient infrastructure to support the lorries needed. However, ENCE has known for years that its factory would be just 6 km (3.7 mi) from the one being built by Botnia and, as of May 2006, it was still vowing that it would never move from the riverside site. Arregui was known to have met with Argentine officials in June. In a critical report, The Economist proposes that Arregui might actually have come under pressure from the Argentine government, known for its interventionism in economy, maybe as a show of strength by President Néstor Kirchner faced with the upcoming 2007 elections.

Botnia's project is much more advanced than ENCE's, and employs 4,500 workers. After a strike started on 12 September, demanding that no more workers be brought from abroad and equal pay for local and foreign workers already in the project, the management decided to pause the construction "due to a lack of guarantees and until the conditions required for the development of this project are re-established." The construction works restarted 7 October with a unanimous decision by the construction workers.

On 24 September, thousands of Gualeguaychú residents marched with cars, motorcycles, and bicycles along Route 136, effectively blocking traffic for more than 3 hours, celebrating ENCE's withdrawal and demanding that Botnia follow suit. At the same time, following rumours that ENCE would move the location of the mills to Paysandú, also on the Uruguay River, some 4,000 residents of Colón, opposite Paysandú, gathered before the international bridge to protest that possibility. The mayors of both cities met the following day to discuss the issue.

== October 2006 ==
=== Argentine newspaper publishes misleading photograph ===
On 15 October La Nación published a beach photo presenting the visual impact of the pulp mill on Ñandubaysal beach. However, the photo had been taken with a 300 mm telephoto lens: the mill hardly visible in the horizon in the 12 kilometer distance is presented to be located in the island close to the Argentine coast.

=== World Bank study says Uruguay mills meet all environmental standards ===
On 12 October the World Bank Group's International Finance Corporation (IFC) and Multilateral Investment Guarantee Agency (MIGA) released the final cumulative impact study for the two proposed pulp mill projects. Both institutions were confident that the findings demonstrated that the mills will comply with IFC and MIGA's environmental and social policies, while generating significant economic benefits for the Uruguayan economy. Also so called Hatfield Consultants, which had in March presented questioned the draft CIS, reviewed the final CIS, and confirmed the results of the final CIS. The more than two hundred pages study performed by EcoMetrix Incorporated concluded that the plans construction and operation posed no risk to air and water quality.

In reaction to the study, the Gualeguaychú Assembly decided to block the international road again during the following long weekend (Columbus Day Weekend). The leaflets distributed for travellers described dire consequences for the life in Gualeguaychú (dioxin pollution, acid rain, increased incidence of cancer) when the mills start operations (the same accusations available in CEDHA homepages). Meanwhile, activists in Buenos Aires started a campaign calling Argentines to stay in Argentina for the summer vacations instead of going to Uruguay. The Argentine government and the provincial Entre Ríos government released a joint statement showing disagreement with the blockade, and laying the blame on the Assembly "for any harm that [the blockade] may cause to Argentine interests", but did not take any specific measures to prevent the blockade. The Assembly of Colón blocked International Road 135 as well, though only intermittently. During the weekend, Romina Picolotti, the Argentine Environment Secretary, sent a letter to IFC authorities claiming that the EcoMetrix study did not provide any new data, but employed those found in the environmental impact studies conducted for Botnia and ENCE, and that the section of the study devoted to the hydrological model was handled by an engineer who had previously been hired for Botnia's own study. Picolotti also claimed there were "substantial errors" in the study, such as exaggerating the flow of the Uruguay River and stating that it is 20 km wide, whereas no part of it is over 12 km wide.

On 17 October, the IFC and MIGA announced that they will ask their Boards of Directors to approve IFC financing and MIGA guarantee support for Oy Metsä-Botnia's Orion pulp mill project in Uruguay. According to the IFC press release, "the decision to proceed was based on an extensive due diligence process, which included the conclusive and positive findings of a cumulative impact study and a subsequent review of the study undertaken by independent experts (the Hatfield report)".

=== Gualeguaychú Assembly's strategy ===
On 20 October the Gualeguaychú Assembly started discussing the possibility of new road blockades and a blockade of the Uruguay River to prevent supplies from reaching Botnia's mill. Assembly member Martín Alazar told Uruguayan newspaper El Observador that "River blockade is likely to happen, we have studied several alternatives and places". Furthermore, the activists are working on challenging the technical reports issued by the International Financial Corporation earlier this week. Other members of the Assembly claimed that "road blockades are, today, the best argument" to stop the construction of the mills, and that they are being forced "to take violent action" faced with the lack of action from the governments.

== November 2006 ==
=== Wall blockade ===
On 3 November (Friday), the Gualeguaychú Assembly decided to stage a new blockade for the duration of the weekend, this time erecting a concrete block wall. The 1.8-meter-high wall blocked International Route 136 almost completely, and displayed a sign in English and Finnish against the pulp mills. On the afternoon of 5 November, the Assembly dismantled the wall and lifted the blockade as planned.

=== King Juan Carlos agrees to intercede ===
During the XVI Ibero-American Summit in Montevideo, presidents Kirchner and Vázquez avoided a meeting between them. However, Kirchner asked King Juan Carlos I to facilitate the renewal of negotiations between the two countries. The proposition was accepted by the Uruguayan government. Trinidad Jiménez, Spanish Secretary of State for Ibero-America, explained that the monarch would not be a mediator, yet he would facilitate the easing of tensions within this conflict. The Uruguayan government, in turn, stated again it would not agree to meetings at the presidential level if a road blockade is in place, as it was at the time. José Pouler, a member of the Gualeguaychú Assembly, expressed support for the facilitation, calling it "a good initiative", though he pointed out that, to them, the construction of the mills on the river "is not negotiable".

=== IFC and MIGA approve loan ===
On 21 November 2006 the boards of directors of the International Finance Corporation and the Multilateral Investment Guarantee Agency approved a $170 million investment by IFC and a guarantee of up to $350 million from MIGA for the proposed project. The press release from the IFC states that "the two organizations, after completing a thorough review of the facts, are convinced that the mill will generate significant economic benefits for Uruguay and cause no environmental harm."

The Argentine president, Néstor Kirchner, reacted to the news by attacking what he considers the stubbornness of his Uruguayan counterpart and expressing that the approval was a victory for the international interests that want the region to be a global waste dump. He also restated that his government will not use force to stop blockades by Gualeguaychu's residents.

== 2006 – 2007: Spanish mediation ==
As promised, the king chose Juan Antonio Yáñez-Barnuevo, ambassador of Spain to the United Nations, as his representative and mediator. Yáñez-Barnuevo met with both governments for the first time in mid-November 2006.

One of the first signs of goodwill was made by the Spanish company Ence. On 13 December, the Spanish company, owner of one of the two planned mills, announced that it will move it 250 km south of its original position, away from the Uruguay River, after negotiations with the Argentine and Uruguayan governments. The remaining mill, owned by the Finnish company Botnia, stay in place. Two of the biggest shareholders of Ence, Alberto Alcocer and Alberto Cortina, were personal friends of the monarch.

At the same time, in January 2007, the International Court of Justice (ICJ) rejected, by 14 votes against one, Uruguay's request for "provisional measures" against Argentina —a form of injunctive relief—aimed at putting an immediate end to blockades of bridges and roads. The ICJ in its ruling stated: "(the ICJ) is not convinced that the blockades risk prejudicing irreparably the rights which Uruguay claims from the 1975 Statute and adds that it has not shown that, were there such a risk, it would be imminent. The Court consequently finds that the circumstances of the case are not such as to require the indication of the first provisional measure requested by Uruguay (to prevent or end the interruption of transit between the two States and inter alia the blockading of the bridges and roads linking them)".

In late April 2007, the king welcomed both parties at Zarzuela Palace, represented by the respective foreign ministers, Jorge Taiana from Argentina and Reinaldo Gargano for Uruguay. Although Spanish mediation explored the possibility of establishing it in a "high environmental protection" zone, no discussion was opened on the matter, as the two sides remained far apart: Argentina wanted to relocate the plant, while Uruguay did not, as it was already 90% complete. The meeting served as an opportunity for the parties to outline their red lines. New meetings were held at the Spanish Representation at the United Nations, in New York, between May and July 2007.

Although the Uruguayan Government initially halted the permits at the request of the Spanish crown until the Ibero-American Summit in Chile, the meetings at that summit did not prosper and the Uruguayan government gave final approval to produce eucalyptus pulp at Botnia's mill in Fray Bentos, and on 15 November 2007 the mill produced its first load. The Uruguayan director for the environment declared that all the environmental tests performed by authorities had produced normal results. Also, the IFC released reports from two independent external consultants that indicated that Botnia's Orion pulp mill in Uruguay was ready to operate in accordance with IFC's environmental and social requirements and international best available technology standards. IFC also provided an updated Environmental and Social Action Plan, reflecting the status of Botnia's compliance with the issues to be addressed as a condition of IFC financing of the project. The reports and updated ESAP confirm that the Orion pulp mill will generate major economic benefits for Uruguay and will not cause harm to the environment.

Following these last events, mediation became unfeasible and tensions between the two countries continued.

In May 2009, Spanish company Ence sold the project to a consortium formed by the Swedish-Finnish company Stora Enso and the Chilean Celulosa Arauco y Constitución, although it maintained "ownership of the forests of the Atlantic region with an area of nearly 30,000 hectares of highly productive eucalyptus".

== March/April 2010 ==
The internal compliance/ombudsman (i.e. the Compliance Advisor/Ombudsman) of the World Bank in Washington, D.C. carried out an appraisal of the Orion Pulp Mill to determine whether internal guidance had been followed and whether the plant was being monitored according to IFC requirements. The conclusions, published on 15 March 2010, of the independent consultant were that:

"• Emissions to air and water have been thoroughly addressed by IFC during the assessment phase, and the monitoring and reporting demonstrate that IFC assured itself of the Project's performance against applicable requirements.

• There is no indication that IFC did not assure itself that the independent verification of the monitoring fulfills the applicable IFC requirement.

• There are no indications that IFC failed to assure itself of the applicability of the World Bank's safeguarding policy OP 7.50 for Waterways (2001).

• This case does not fulfill the criteria for further investigation in the form of an audit.

CAO has closed appraisal of this case with no further action."

Argentina filed suit in 2006 at the International Court of Justice in The Hague, a court that adjudicates disputes between States, claiming that pollution from the mills will cause serious environmental damage and that they were being erected in breach of the 1975 border treaty known as the Statute of the River Uruguay

In April 2010, the ICJ ruled the pulp mill in Uruguay can keep operating. It is also stated that Uruguay failed to negotiate with Argentina over the plant, but said it would not be appropriate to make Uruguay pay damages or dismantle the operation. Argentine Foreign Minister Jorge Taiana calls Gualeguaychú activists to reconsider their hard position and lift pickets. Presidents Cristina Fernández and José Mujica will meet at Quinta de Olivos in Buenos Aires to analyze the result

In December 2009 Finnish UPM-Kymmene Oyj became the sole owner of the pulp mill.

== End of the dispute ==
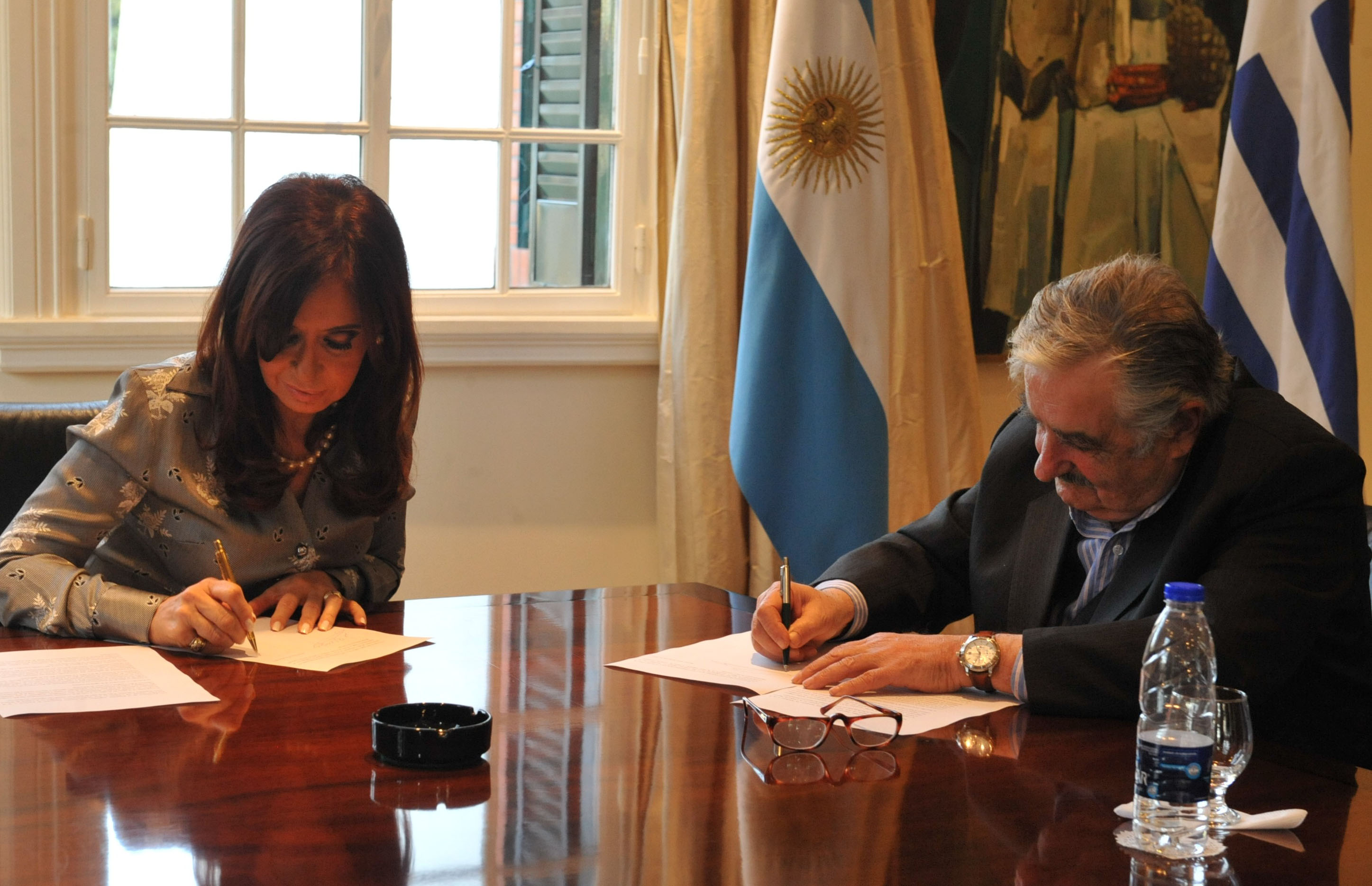
The President signing the agreement in July 2010

New Uruguay president José Mujica made a great effort to end the dispute meeting with president Cristina Fernández de Kirchner four times in a few weeks in 2010. Former president Tabaré Vázquez recognized in a visit to Buenos Aires that he was not able to do so. On 19 June, the environmentalists lift the bridge blockade and on 28 July both presidents agreed to create a binational commission CARU (Spanish: Comisión Administradora del Río Uruguay) in order to monitor the river pollution officially ending the dispute as a basic agreement that satisfies both societies and the two governments

Tabaré Vázquez mentioned in October 2011 that he had considered the possibility of an armed conflict with Argentina over the topic, and sought support of the United States (during the presidency of George Bush) in such a case. He had interviews with Condoleezza Rice, and ordered the military commanders to stay ready.

== 2013 ==
Uruguay allowed UPM to increase production at Fray Bentos mill from 1.1 million tonnes a year to 1.3 million tonnes in 2013. Argentina threatened to take Uruguay to the International Court of Justice, despite having lost its earlier case. Uruguay Senator Lucia Topolansky denied that there were plans to construct a new plant at the site.

== Documentary Films ==
El Gran Simulador (2007)

== See also ==
- Argentina-Uruguay relations
- CELCO
- Foreign relations of Argentina
- Foreign relations of Uruguay
- List of International Court of Justice cases
- Environmental issues in Argentina
- Environmental issues in Uruguay
