= General Artigas Bridge =

Libertador General San Martín Bridge
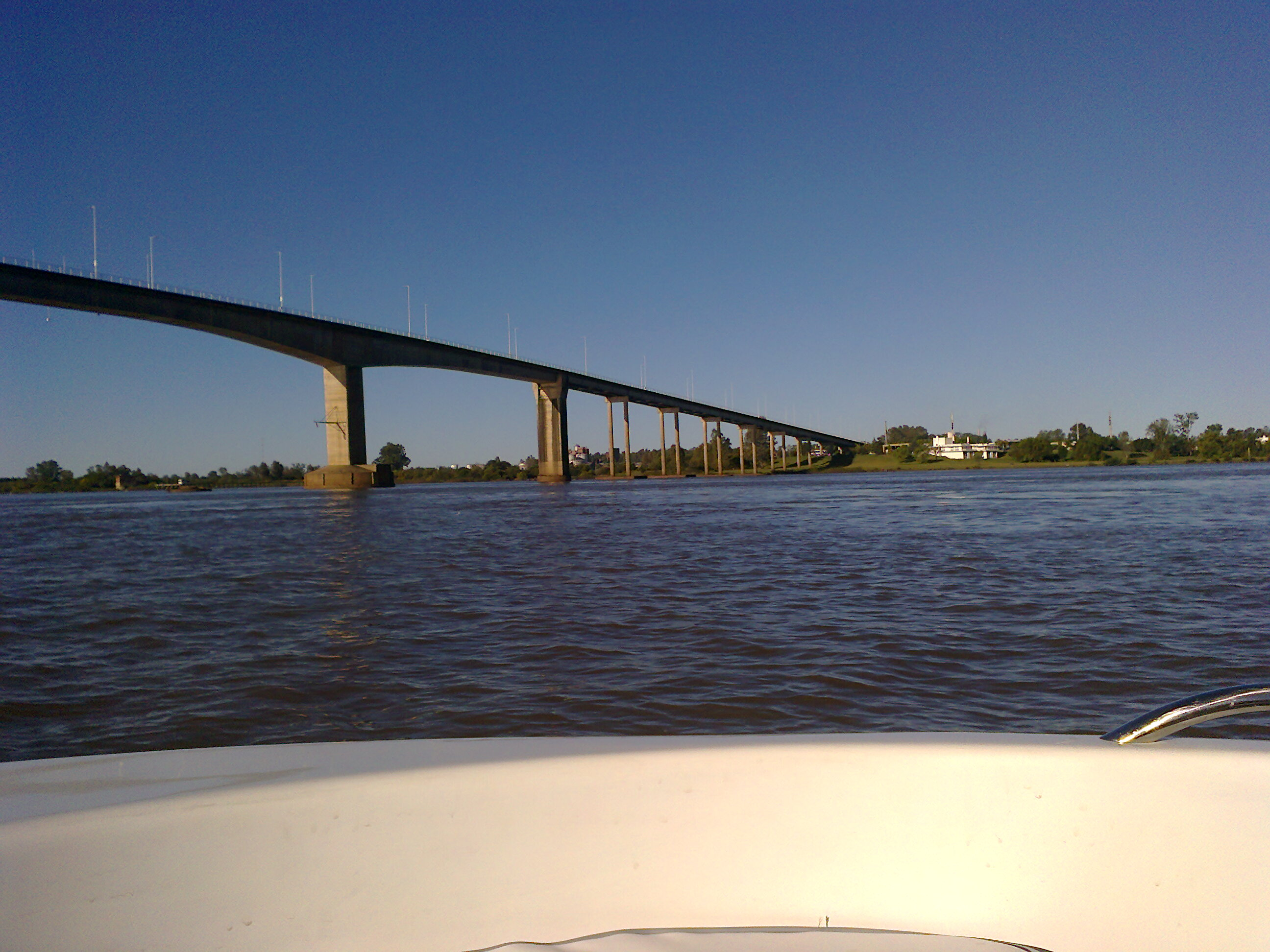
- Coordinates: 32°15′53″S 58°06′06″W
- Crosses: Uruguay River
- Locale: Colón, Entre Ríos Province, Argentina. Paysandú, Paysandú, Uruguay
- Preceded by: Salto Grande Bridge
- Followed by: Libertador General San Martín Bridge

Characteristics
- Design: Cantilever bridge
- Total length: 2,350 metres (7,710 ft)
- Width: 12 metres (39 ft)
- Longest span: 140 metres (460 ft)
- Clearance below: 34 metres (112 ft)

History
- Construction start: 1970
- Opened: December 10, 1975

Location
- Interactive map of Libertador General San Martín Bridge

The General Artigas Bridge (Spanish: Puente General Artigas) is an international road bridge that crosses the Uruguay River and joins Argentina and Uruguay. It runs between Colón, Entre Ríos Province, Argentina, and Paysandú, Paysandú Department, Uruguay. It is a cantilever bridge with a total length of 2,350 metres (7,709 ft). The main span of the bridge measures 140 metres (460 ft) in length.

The bridge is named after José Gervasio Artigas, the father of Uruguayan independence. It was inaugurated on December 10, 1975.

== See also ==
- Libertador General San Martín Bridge
- Salto Grande Bridge
- Cellulose plant conflict between Argentina and Uruguay
- List of international bridges
