= Libertador General San Martín Bridge =

- Coordinates: 33°06′02″S 58°14′55″W
- Crosses: Uruguay River
- Locale: Gualeguaychú, Entre Ríos Province, Argentina. Fray Bentos, Río Negro, Uruguay
- Preceded by: General Artigas Bridge

Characteristics
- Design: Cantilever bridge
- Total length: 5,366 metres (17,605 ft) (overall); 3,408 metres (11,181 ft) (bridge)
- Width: 9.80 metres (32.2 ft)
- Longest span: 220 metres (720 ft)
- Clearance below: 45 metres (148 ft)

History
- Construction start: 1972
- Opened: September 16, 1976

Location
- Interactive map of Libertador General San Martín Bridge

The Libertador General San Martín Bridge (Spanish: Puente Libertador General San Martín) is a cantilever road bridge that crosses the Uruguay River and joins Argentina and Uruguay. It runs between Puerto Unzué, near Gualeguaychú, Entre Ríos Province, Argentina, and Fray Bentos, Río Negro Department, Uruguay, 100 km upstream from the start of the Río de la Plata, and 320 km the Atlantic Ocean.

The bridge has a total length of 5,366 meters (3.334 miles) (4,220 meters (13,850 feet) in Argentine jurisdiction and 1,146 meters (3,760 feet) in Uruguayan territory), including the bridge and accesses embankments.

Studies for the construction of a bridge over the Uruguay River were started in 1960 by a joint commission, which decided that the best place for it would be between Puerto Unzué and Fray Bentos. In 1967 the two countries signed an agreement ratifying the location, and in 1972 the construction contract was awarded to the International Bridge Consortium (Consorcio Puente Internacional), setting the cost at $ 21.7 million, then adjusted upwards.

The bridge is named after José de San Martín, a major figure in the struggle for independence in Argentina, Chile and Peru. It was officially inaugurated on September 16, 1976. It was opened for public use and the next day it started functioning under a toll regime. There are other bridges upstream, but no further bridges downstream. During the Uruguay River pulp mill dispute from 2005 to 2010, the bridge was blocked by demonstrators several times.

== See also ==
- General Artigas Bridge
- Salto Grande Bridge
- Cellulose plant conflict between Argentina and Uruguay
- List of international bridges
