= Diego Cánepa (politician) =

Uruguayan lawyer and politician

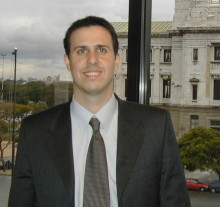
Diego Cánepa

Diego Cánepa Baccino (Montevideo, April 26, 1972) is a Uruguayan lawyer and politician. Member of Nuevo Espacio, a social democratic political party headed by Senator Rafael Michelini that is part of the Frente Amplio coalition, the party ruling Uruguay since 2005.

== Biography ==
Cánepa's political activity began at the university students’ union. He was a member of the political governing body of the Federation of University Students of Uruguay (FEUU) between 1992 and 1997.

He was a member of the political party Partido por el Gobierno del Pueblo (PGP) and a representative of Juventud 99 at the International Union of Socialist Youth (IUSY) until 1994. In 1994, once the Nuevo Espacio party had been created, he became its first representative at IUSY.

Elected in 2004 as a National Representative for the Department of Montevideo. In Parliament he is a member of the Committee for Constitutional, Legal, Code and General Administration matters, of the Special Committee for Research, Innovation, Science and Technology, and the Committees for Foreign Affairs; Education and Culture; Industry, Energy and Mining; and for Dwelling, Territory and Environmental matters of the Chamber of Representatives. He was the General Coordinator of the Parliamentary Caucus of the Government party for the 2008-2009 period.

He was a member of the Mercosur Parliamentary Joint Committee until 2006 and upon the inauguration of the Mercosur Parliament; he became member of Mercosur Parliamentarian.

In 2008 he was elected Chairman of the standing Committee for Human Rights and Democracy of the Inter-Parliamentary Union (IPU).

In 2025, Foreign Minister Mario Lubetkin tapped Cánepa for ambassador to Argentina.
